= 2008–09 Zamalek SC season =

Zamalek
2008–09 season
- Chairman: Mamdouh Abbas
- Manager: (Germany) Reiner Hollmann (until 6 December 2008) (Switzerland) Michel Decastel
- Egyptian Premier League: 6th
- Egypt Cup: Round 32
- Super Cup: Runner-Up
- CAF Champions League: Eliminated (Round 8)

== Key Dates ==
- 26 May 2008 - Ruud Krol leaves Zamalek.
- 4 June 2008 - Besheer El-Tabei, Tarek El-Sayed, Magdy Atwa, Khaled Saad, Wael Zenga and Ahmed Hossam leaves Zamalek.
- 6 June 2008 - Hazem Emam retired.
- 9 June 2008 - Zamalek sign Ayman Abdelaziz from Trabzonspor for four years.
- 10 June 2008 - Zamalek sign Amir Azmy from Hacettepe Spor Kulübü for four years.
- 12 June 2008 - Zamalek sign Amr Adel from El-Jaish for three years.
- 21 June 2008 - Zamalek name Reiner Hollmann as new manager.
- 24 June 2008 - Amir Azmy leaves Zamalek.
- 2 July 2008 - Zamalek buy Junior Agogo from Nottingham Forest for $2.5 million.
- 10 July 2008 - Mohammed Helmy leaves Zamalek.
- 11 July 2008 - Zamalek name Tarek Yehia as new assistant manager.
- 12 July 2008 - Zamalek buy Hany Said from Ismaily for $1.5 million.
- 24 July 2008 - Zamalek sign Ricardo Alves Fernandes for free.

== Team Kit ==
The team kits for the 2008–09 season are produced by Adidas. The home kit was revealed at Zamalek TV website on April 4. The kit was first worn in the first CAF Champions League game of the 2007–08 season. An all-black kit with white stripes replaced the bright-yellow away kit from the 2006–07 season.

Home	Away	Goalkeeper home	Goalkeeper away

== Squad ==
Note: Flags indicate national team as defined under FIFA eligibility rules; some limited exceptions apply. Players may hold more than one non-FIFA nationality.

No.	Pos.	Nation	Player
1	GK	EGY	Mohamed Abdel Monsef
2	DF	EGY	Amr ElSafty
3	DF	EGY	Osama Hassan
4	DF	TUN	Wisam El Abdy
5	MF	EGY	Mahmoud Samir
6	DF	EGY	Hany Said
7	DF	EGY	Ahmed Ghanem Soltan
8	MF	EGY	Alaa Abdelghani
9	FW	GHA	Junior Agogo
10	FW	EGY	Gamal hamza
11	MF	EGY	Mohamed Aboul Ela (Captain)
13	DF	EGY	Omar Rabie Yassin
15	DF	EGY	Amr Adel
16	GK	EGY	Abdelwahed el-Sayed (Vice-Captain)
17	FW	EGY	Mostafa Gaafar
18	MF	EGY	Shikabala
19	FW	EGY	Mohamed El Morsy
20	DF	EGY	Mahmoud Fathallah

No.	Pos.	Nation	Player
21	GK	EGY	Emad El-Sayed
22	DF	EGY	Ahmed Magdy
23	DF	EGY	Mohamed Abdullah
24	FW	EGY	Abdel Halim Ali
26	MF	EGY	Ahmed Abdel-Raouf
29	FW	CIV	Eugène Koffi Kouamé
30	MF	EGY	Alaa Kamal
31	DF	EGY	Ahmed M.Ibrahim
32	FW	EGY	Sherif Ashraf
33	MF	EGY	Alaa Ali
34	MF	EGY	Ahmed El Merghany
35	DF	EGY	Mohamed Hazem Emam
36	MF	EGY	Hossam Arafat
37	DF	EGY	Sabry Raheel
38	MF	EGY	Ibrahim Salah

=== Youth Squad ===
Note: Flags indicate national team as defined under FIFA eligibility rules; some limited exceptions apply. Players may hold more than one non-FIFA nationality.

No.	Pos.	Nation	Player
—		EGY	Alaa Ali (Youth)
33		EGY	Mohamed Ibrahim (Youth)
—		EGY	Ahmed Zakaria (Youth)
—		EGY	Ahmed El-Marghani (Youth)
—		EGY	Ayman El-Mohamadi (Youth)
—		EGY	Shiref Ragab (Youth)
—		EGY	Khaled Mostafa (Youth)
—		EGY	Ahmed Fekri (Youth)
—		EGY	Hosam Arafat (Youth)

== Transfers ==
=== In ===
TW	#	Pos	EG	Player	From	Fee	Date
Summer	05	MF	Egypt passport	(Egypt) Mahmoud Samir	Al-Mokawloon	Undisclosed	25 May 2008
Summer	06	DF	Egypt passport	(Egypt) Hany Said	Ismaily	€ 750K	12 July 2008
Summer	09	FW	no Egypt passport	(Ghana) Junior Agogo	Nottingham Forest	€ 750K	2 July 2008
Summer	12	MF	Egypt passport	(Egypt) Ayman Abdelaziz	Trabzonspor	€ 630K	9 June 2008
Summer	15	DF	Egypt passport	(Egypt) Amr Adel	El Geish	Unattatched	12 June 2008
Summer	25	DF	no Egypt passport	(Brazil) Ricardo Alves Fernandes	Al-Ittihad	Undisclosed	24 July 2008
Summer	30	MF	Egypt passport	(Egypt) Alaa Kamal	Al-Mokawloon	Undisclosed	25 May 2008
Winter	13	DF	Egypt passport	(Egypt) Omar Rabie Yassin	Lierse S.K.	Undisclosed	8 January 2009
Winter	19	FW	Egypt passport	(Egypt) Mohamed El Morsy	El Mansoura SC	€ 162K	25 January 2009
Winter	38	DF	Egypt passport	(Egypt) Ibrahim Salah	El Mansoura SC	€ 312K	26 January 2009
Winter	37	DF	Egypt passport	(Egypt) Sabry Raheel	Misr Lel-Makkasa SC	€ 31K	27 January 2009
Winter	29	FW	no Egypt passport	(Ivory Coast) Eugène Koffi Kouamé	Ivorian Army	€ 46K	2 March 2009

=== Out ===
TW	#	Pos	EG	Player	To	Fee	Date
Summer	05	DF	Egypt passport	(Egypt) Besheer El-Tabei	Konyaspor	Free	4 June 2008
Summer	06	DF	Egypt passport	(Egypt) Ahmed Hossam	El-Ittihad	Free	4 June 2008
Summer	12	MF	Egypt passport	(Egypt) Magdy Atwa	Tersana	Free	4 June 2008
Summer	13	DF	Egypt passport	(Egypt) Tarek El-Sayed	Itesalat	Free	4 June 2008
Summer	30	DF	no Egypt passport	(Jordan) Khaled Saad	Nejmeh	Free	4 June 2008
Summer	14	MF	Egypt passport	(Egypt) Hazem Emam	N/A	Retired	6 June 2008
Summer	23	MF	Egypt passport	(Egypt) Wael Zenga	El-Ittihad	Free	4 June 2008
Winter	09	FW	no Egypt passport	(Ghana) Junior Agogo	Apollon Limassol	Free	24 January 2009
Winter	13	DF	Egypt passport	(Egypt) Omar Rabie Yassin	N/A	Free	10 March 2009
Winter	25	MF	no Egypt passport	(Brazil) Ricardo Alves Fernandes	N/A	Free	27 February 2009

=== Loaned out ===
TW	#	Pos	Player	To	Fee	Start	End
Summer	09	FW	(Egypt) Amr Zaki	(England) Wigan Athletic	£1.25million + $0.5 million	01-07-2008	30–06–2009

=== Overall ===
This section displays the club's financial expenditure's in the transfer market. Because all transfer fee's are not disclosed to the public, the numbers displayed in this section are only based on figures released by media outlets.

==== Spending ====
Summer: ▼£1,833,130

Winter: ▼£474,151

Total: ▼£2,307,281

==== Income ====
Summer: ▲£1,553,022

Winter: ▲£0

Total: ▲£1,553,022

==== Expenditure ====
Summer: ▼£280,108

Winter: ▼£474,151

Total: ▼£754,259

== Statistics ==
=== Appearances and goals ===
No.	Pos	Nat	Player	Total		2008–09 Egyptian Premier League		Egypt Cup	
No.	Pos	Nat	Player	Apps	Goals	Apps	Goals	Apps	Goals
1	GK	(Egypt) EGY	Mohamed Abdel Monsef	6	-3	5+1	-3	0+0	0
2	DF	(Egypt) EGY	Amr El-Safty	15	0	13+2	0	0+0	0
3	DF	(Egypt) EGY	Osama Hassan	3	0	1+1	0	0+1	0
4	DF	(Tunisia) TUN	Wisam El Abdy	4	1	4+0	1	0+0	0
5	MF	(Egypt) EGY	Mahmoud Samir	10	1	0+9	1	0+1	0
6	DF	(Egypt) EGY	Hany Said	21	3	20+0	3	1+0	0
7	DF	(Egypt) EGY	Ahmed Ghanem Soltan	12	0	10+1	0	1+0	0
8	MF	(Egypt) EGY	Alaa Abdelghani	0	0	0+0	0	0+0	0
9	FW	(Ghana) GHA	Junior Agogo	5	3	2+3	3	0+0	0
10	FW	(Egypt) EGY	Gamal hamza	11	1	5+5	1	0+1	0
11	MF	(Egypt) EGY	Mohamed Aboul Ela	8	0	6+2	0	0+0	0
13	DF	(Egypt) EGY	Omar Rabie Yassin	0	0	0+0	0	0+0	0
15	DF	(Egypt) EGY	Amr Adel	10	0	9+1	0	0+0	0
16	GK	(Egypt) EGY	Abdelwahed El-Sayed	25	-27	24+0	-26	1+0	-1
17	MF	(Egypt) EGY	Mostafa Gaafar	8	2	3+5	2	0+0	0
18	DF	(Egypt) EGY	Shikabala	14	3	8+5	3	1+0	0
20	DF	(Egypt) EGY	Mahmoud Fathallah	27	5	26+0	5	1+0	0
21	GK	(Egypt) EGY	Emad El-Sayed	0	0	0+0	0	0+0	0
22	DF	(Egypt) EGY	Ahmed Magdy	23	2	22+0	2	1+0	0
23	DF	(Egypt) EGY	Mohamed Abdullah	19	0	6+13	0	0+0	0
24	FW	(Egypt) EGY	Abdel Halim Ali	19	3	9+9	3	1+0	0
25	DF	(Brazil) BRA	Ricardo Alves Fernandes	6	1	6+0	1	0+0	0
26	MF	(Egypt) EGY	Ahmed Abdel-Raouf	20	0	13+6	0	1+0	0
27	MF	(Egypt) EGY	Mohamed Ibrahim	6	0	3+3	0	0+0	0
29	FW	(Ivory Coast) CIV	Eugène Koffi Kouamé	3	0	2+1	0	0+0	0
30	MF	(Egypt) EGY	Alaa Kamal	7	1	3+4	1	0+0	0
31	DF	(Egypt) EGY	Ahmed Mohamed Ibrahim	3	0	2+1	0	0+0	0
32	FW	(Egypt) EGY	Sherif Ashraf	17	6	4+13	6	0+0	0
33	MF	(Egypt) EGY	Alaa Ali	16	0	3+12	0	1+0	0
34	MF	(Egypt) EGY	Ahmed El Merghany	16	0	14+1	0	1+0	0
35	DF	(Egypt) EGY	Mohamed Hazem Emam	13	0	8+5	0	0+0	0
36	MF	(Egypt) EGY	Hossam Arafat	4	0	1+3	0	0+0	0
37	DF	(Egypt) EGY	Sabry Raheel	12	1	10+2	1	0+0	0
38	MF	(Egypt) EGY	Ibrahim Salah	5	0	0+5	0	0+0	0

=== Top scorers ===
Includes all competitive matches. The list is sorted by shirt number when total goals are equal.

Last updated on 11 August

Position	Nation	Number	Name	Egyptian Premier League	Egypt Cup	CAF Champions League	Total
1	(Egypt)	32	Sherif Ashraf	6	0	0	6
2	(Egypt)	20	Mahmoud Fathallah	5	0	0	5
3	(Ghana)	9	Junior Agogo	3	0	1	4
=	(Egypt)	24	Abdel Halim Ali	3	0	0	3
=	(Egypt)	6	Hany Said	3	0	0	3
=	(Egypt)	18	Shikabala	3	0	0	3
=	(Egypt)	10	Gamal hamza	1	0	2	3
=	(Egypt)	22	Ahmed Magdy	2	0	0	2
=	(Egypt)	17	Mostafa Gaafar	2	0	0	2
=	(Egypt)	30	Alaa Kamal	1	0	0	1
=	(Egypt)	5	Mahmoud Samir	1	0	0	1
=	(Brazil)	25	Ricardo Alves Fernandes	1	0	0	1
=	(Egypt)	37	Sabry Raheel	1	0	0	1
=	(Tunisia)	4	Wisam El Abdy	1	0	0	1
=	(Egypt)	2	Amr El-Safty	0	0	1	1
/	/	/	Own Goals	1	0	0	1
			TOTALS	34	0	4	38

=== Disciplinary record ===
Includes all competitive matches. Players with 1 card or more included only.

Last updated on 30 May

Position	Nation	Number	Name	Egyptian Premier League		Egypt Cup		Total	
Position	Nation	Number	Name	Booked	Sent off (straight red)	Booked	Sent off (straight red)	Booked	Sent off (straight red)
DF	(Egypt)	12	Amr ElSafty	6	1	0	0	6	1
DF	(Egypt)	20	Mahmoud Fathallah	6	0	0	0	6	0
MF	(Egypt)	18	Merghany	6	0	0	0	6	0
DF	(Egypt)	7	Ahmed Ghanem	5	0	0	0	5	0
DF	(Egypt)	35	Hazem Emam	5	0	0	0	5	0
DF	(Egypt)	6	Hany Said	5	0	0	0	5	0
DF	(Egypt)	23	Mohamed Abdullah	4	1	0	0	4	1
DF	(Egypt)	22	Ahmed Magdy	3	0	0	0	3	0
FW	(Ghana)	9	Junior Agogo	2	0	0	0	2	0
FW	(Egypt)	24	Abdel Halim Ali	2	0	0	0	2	0
MF	(Egypt)	26	Ahmed Abdel-Raouf	2	0	0	0	2	0
FW	(Egypt)	10	Gamal hamza	2	0	0	0	2	0
GK	(Egypt)	16	Abdelwahed el-Sayed	2	0	0	0	2	0
MF	(Egypt)	18	Shikabala	1	0	0	0	1	0
MF	(Egypt)	11	Mohamed Aboul Ela	1	0	0	0	1	0

* = 1 suspension withdrawn
** = 2 suspensions withdrawn
*** = 3 suspensions withdrawn

=== Overall ===
Games played	38 (30 Egyptian Premier League, 1 Egypt Cup, 1 Egyptian Super Cup, 6 CAF Champions League)
Games won	12 (11 Egyptian Premier League, 1 CAF Champions League)
Games drawn	11 (9 Egyptian Premier League, 2 CAF Champions League)
Games lost	15 (10 Egyptian Premier League, 1 Egypt Cup, 1 Egyptian Super Cup, 3 CAF Champions League)
Goals scored	38
Goals conceded	37
Goal difference	+1
Yellow cards	52
Red cards	3
Worst discipline	
Best result	4-1 (A) v ENPPI - Egyptian Premier League - 2008.10.21
Worst result	0-3 (A) v ASEC Mimosas - CAF Champions League - 2008.8.31
Most appearances	(Egypt) Mahmoud Fathallah (27 match)
Top scorer	(Egypt) Ahmed El Merghany (1 goal)
Points	47/108 (43.5%)

== Competitions ==
Correct as of 27 Sep 2008

Championship	Result
Egyptian Premier League	Round 15(Sixes)
Egyptian Cup	Eliminated 32 by Bani Ebed
Egyptian Super Cup	Final
CAF Champions League	Group A(Fourth)

=== League table ===
Pos	Prg	Team	Pld	W	D	L	GF	GA	GD	Pts
5	▼	ENPPI SC	30	13	10	7	49	39	+10	49
6	=	Zamalek SC	30	11	9	10	34	29	+5	42
7	=	Tala'ea El Gaish SC	30	10	8	12	40	50	−10	38

Updated to match(es) played on May 24, 2009. Source: FIFA.com

=== League matches ===
Round	Date	Opponents	H / A	Result	Scorers
1	8 August 2008	Ghazl El-Mehalla	A	2 – 0	Amr Ramadan(og) 10', Mahmoud Fathalla 48'
2	14 August 2008	Ittihad	H	1 – 1	Mahmoud Fathalla 6'
3	24 August 2008	Masry	H	2 – 1	Wisam El-Abdi 2', Junior Agogo 52'
4	27 Sep 2008	Itesalat	A	4 – 2	Gamal Hamza 45', Mahmoud Fathalla 67'(Pen), Mostafa Gaafar 81', Mahmoud Samir 94'
5	29 Sep 2008	Tersana	H	1 – 0	Mostafa Gaafar 27'
6	21 Oct 2008(PPD)	ENPPI	A	4 – 1	Junior Agogo 25', Amr ElSafty 49', Ahmed Magdy 73', Sherif Ashraf 80'
7	8 Dec 2008(PPD)	Haras El Hodood	H	0 – 1	
8	17 Oct 2008	El-Jaish	A	0 – 1	
9	26 Oct 2008	El-Olympi	H	1 – 3	Ricardo 25'
10	11 Jan 2009	Al Ahly	A	0 – 1	
11	7 Nov 2008	Al-Mokawloon	H	0 – 0	
12	14 Nov 2008	Petrojet	A	0 – 0	
13	30 Nov 2008	Ismaily	H	0 – 1	
14	12 Dec 2008	Asyut Petroleum	A	0 – 2	
15	20 Dec 2008	Ittihad El-Shorta	H	3 – 1	Shikabala 12', Abdel Halim Ali 37', Junior Agogo 70'
16	5 February 2009	Ghazl El-Mehalla	H	0 – 1	
17	14 February 2009	Ittihad	A	0 – 1	
18	18 February 2009	Masry	A	1 – 1	Hany Said 19'
19	23 February 2009	Itesalat	H	1 – 1	Ahmed Magdy 49'(Pen)
20	27 February 2008	Tersana	A	0 – 0	
21	3 March 2008(PPD)	ENPPI	H	1 – 0	Hany Said 75'
22	7 March 2008(PPD)	Haras El Hodood	A	1 – 2	Sherif Ashraf 78'
23	14 March 2008	El-Jaish	H	4 – 2	Sherif Ashraf 11',53', Abdel Halim Ali 63', Shikabala 83'
24	20 March 2008	El-Olympi	A	2 – 0	Sabry Raheel 81', Shikabala 82'
25	23 April 2009	Al Ahly	H	0 – 0	
26	8 April 2008	Al-Mokawloon	A	1 – 1	Mahmoud Fathallah 45'
27	16 April 2008	Petrojet	H	2 – 1	Sherif Ashraf 53',54'
28	28 April 2008	Ismaily	A	1 – 3	Abdel Halim Ali 28'
29	11 May 2008	Asyut Petroleum	H	0 – 0	
30	20 May 2008	Ittihad El-Shorta	A	2 – 0	Alaa Kamal 63'(Pen), Hany Said 73'(Pen)

=== Cup matches ===
Date	Opponents	H / A	Result	Scorers
26 Dec 2008	Bany Ebeid	A	0 – 1	

2008-11-26
11:30

Bany Ebeid	1 – 0	Zamalek
El-Mandoh 80'	(Report)

El Mansoura Stadium, El Mansoura

=== Super Cup match ===
Date	Stadium	Opponent	Result	Scorers
27 July 2008	Cairo International Stadium	Al Ahly	0 – 2	

2008-11-26
18:00

Al Ahly	0 – 2	Zamalek
Hassan 47'; Eno 89'	(Report)	El Abdy (red card) 46'

Cairo International Stadium, Cairo

=== CAF Champions League ===
==== Group table ====
Pos	Team	Pld	W	D	L	GF	GA	GD	Pts	Qualification
1	(Egypt) Al Ahly	6	3	3	0	9	6	+3	12	Advance to knockout stage
2	(Zimbabwe) Dynamos	6	3	0	3	6	6	0	9	Advance to knockout stage
3	(Ivory Coast) ASEC Mimosas	6	1	3	2	7	6	+1	6	
4	(Egypt) Zamalek	6	1	2	3	4	8	−4	5	

==== Matches table ====
Stage	Round	Date	Opponents	H / A	Result	Scorers
Group stage	1	20 July 2008	Al Ahly	A	1 – 2	Hamza 62'
Group stage	2	3 Aug 2008	Dynamos	H	1 – 0	Amr ElSafty 4'
Group stage	3	16 Aug 2008	ASEC Mimosas	H	0 – 0	
Group stage	4	31 Aug 2008	ASEC Mimosas	A	0 – 3	
Group stage	5	14 Sep 2008	Al Ahly	H	2 – 2	Hamza 40', Agogo 51'
Group stage	6	21 Sep 2008	Dynamos	A	0 – 1	

==== Matches ====
2008-07-20
17:30 GMT

Al Ahly (Egypt)	2 – 1	(Egypt) Zamalek
Flavio 28'; Wael Gomaa (yellow card) 42'; Hassan 67'; Flavio (yellow card) 68'	report	El-Abdi (yellow card) 36'; Hamza 62'

Cairo Stadium, Cairo
Referee: Coffi Codjia (Benin)
2008-08-03
18:00 GMT

Zamalek (Egypt)	1 – 0	(Zimbabwe) Dynamos
El Safty 4'

Cairo Stadium, Cairo
Referee: Mohamed Benouza (Algeria)
2008-08-16
18:00 GMT

Zamalek (Egypt)	0 – 0	(Ivory Coast) ASEC Mimosas

Cairo Stadium, Cairo
2008-08-31
15:30 GMT

ASEC Mimosas (Ivory Coast)	3 – 0	(Egypt) Zamalek
Guindo 24'; Bamba 68'; N'Gossan 72'

Stade Félix Houphouët-Boigny, Abidjan
2008-09-14
20:00 GMT

Zamalek (Egypt)	2 – 2	(Egypt) Al Ahly
El-Safty (yellow card) 6'; Hamza 40'; Agogo 51'; Hamza (yellow card) 58'	report	Flavio (yellow card) 4'; Flavio 9'; Aboutreika 70'

Cairo Stadium, Cairo
Referee: Eddy Maillet (Seychelles)
2008-09-21
13:00 GMT

Dynamos (Zimbabwe)	1 – 0	(Egypt) Zamalek
Shoko 90'

Rufaro Stadium, Harare
Referee: Alex Kotey (Ghana)
