= 2009–10 Zamalek SC season =

Zamalek
2009–10 season
- Chairman: Mamdouh Abbas
- Manager: Hossam Hassan
- Egyptian Premier League: 2nd
- Egypt Cup: Eliminated from Round of 16
Home colours	Away colours	Third colours

== Key Dates ==
- 3 June 2009 – Osama Hassan, Alaa Abdelghani and Koffi Ole leaves Zamalek.
- 4 June 2009 – Zamalek sign Ahmed Gaafar from Itesalat for four years for € 382K.
- 8 June 2009 – Zamalek sign Shawky El-Said from Al-Shams for four years for € 129K .
- 10 June 2009 – Zamalek retracted from signing Shawky El-Said from Al-Shams for unknown reasons.
- 14 June 2009 – Zamalek sign Mohamed Abdel-Shafy from Ghazl El-Mehalla for five years for € 452K.
- 16 June 2009 – Zamalek sign Abdul Rahim Ayew from Nania F.C. for five years for € 182K.
- 20 June 2009 – Gamal Hamza leaves Zamalek and signs FSV Mainz 05 for a free deal.
- 20 June 2009 – Mohamed El Morsy loaned to Al Ittihad.
- 21 June 2009 – Zamalek sign Sayed Mosaad from Qanah for five years for € 128K.
- 24 June 2009 – Mahmoud Samir and Alaa Kamal leaves Zamalek and signs Al Mokawloon for a free deal.
- 25 June 2009 – Mohamed Abdullah and Mohamed Aboul Ela leaves Zamalek.
- 27 June 2009 – Abdel Halim Ali retires and acquired by Zamalek as Assistant Coach.
- 29 June 2009 – Zamalek sign Hassan Mostafa from Ahly for two years for a free deal.
- 28 January 2010 – Zamalek sign Hussein Yasser from Ahly for 3.5 years for a free deal.
- 30 January 2010 – Zamalek sign Rainford Kalaba from Sporting Braga for 6 months on loan for $25000 .(failed)

== Team kit ==
The team kits for the 2009–10 season are produced by Adidas and was revealed since the 2008–09 season

Home	Away	Goalkeeper home	Goalkeeper away

== Current squad ==
Note: Flags indicate national team as defined under FIFA eligibility rules; some limited exceptions apply. Players may hold more than one non-FIFA nationality.

No.	Pos.	Nation	Player
1	GK	EGY	Mohamed Abdel Monsef (Vice-Captain)
2	DF	EGY	Amr El-Safty
3	DF	EGY	Sabry Raheel
4	FW	EGY	Sherif Ashraf
5	MF	EGY	Ibrahim Salah
6	DF	EGY	Hany Said
7	DF	EGY	Ahmed Ghanem Soltan
8	MF	EGY	Hassan Mostafa
9	FW	EGY	Amr Zaki
10	MF	EGY	Mahmoud Abdel-Razek "Shikabala"
11	FW	EGY	Ahmed Gaafar
12	MF	EGY	Ahmed El Merghany
13	DF	EGY	Mohamed Abdel-Shafy
14	MF	QAT	Hussein Yasser

No.	Pos.	Nation	Player
15	DF	EGY	Amr Adel
16	GK	EGY	Abdel-Wahed El-Sayed (captain)
17	MF	EGY	Alaa Ali
18	DF	EGY	Hazem Mohamed Emam
19	FW	EGY	Sayed Mosaad
20	DF	EGY	Mahmoud Fathallah
21	GK	EGY	Emad El-Sayed
22	DF	EGY	Ahmed Magdy
23	FW	CIV	Rémi Adiko
26	MF	EGY	Ahmed Abdel-Raouf
30	MF	GHA	Abdul Rahim Ayew
32	FW	EGY	Ahmed Fathi 'Bougy'
33	FW	EGY	Mohamed Ibrahim
34	MF	EGY	Omar Gaber
36	MF	EGY	Hossam Arafat

=== Players Under 21 ===
Note: Flags indicate national team as defined under FIFA eligibility rules; some limited exceptions apply. Players may hold more than one non-FIFA nationality.

No.	Pos.	Nation	Player
28	DF	EGY	Mostafa Hegab
—	DF	EGY	Ahmed Ezzel Regal
—	DF	EGY	Mohamed Refaie
—	DF	EGY	Amr Barakat
—	MF	EGY	Hagag Shaaban

=== Out on loan ===
Note: Flags indicate national team as defined under FIFA eligibility rules; some limited exceptions apply. Players may hold more than one non-FIFA nationality.

No.	Pos.	Nation	Player
—	FW	EGY	Mohamed El Morsy (at El-Ittihad El-Iskandary until the end of season 2009–2010)
—	MF	EGY	Ayman Abdel Aziz (at Diyarbakırspor until the end of season 2009–2010)
—	FW	EGY	Amr Zaki (at Hull City A.F.C. until the end of season 2009–2010)

== Transfers ==
=== In ===
#	Pos	Player	From	Fee	Date
TBD	CM	(Egypt) Ahmed Tharwat	AlRebat We Alanwar	Unattatched	27 January 2009
11	FW	(Egypt) Ahmed Gaafar	Itesalat	€ 382K	4 June 2009
13	LB	(Egypt) Mohamed Abdel-Shafy	Ghazl El-Mehalla	€ 452K	14 June 2009
30	CM	(Ghana) Abdul Rahim Ayew	Nania F.C.	€ 182K	16 June 2009
19	FW	(Egypt) Sayed Mosaad	Qanah	€ 128K	21 June 2009
8	MF	(Egypt) Hassan Mostafa	Ahly	Free	29 June 2009
14	FW	(Egypt) Mido	Middlesbrough	Free	1 August 2009
23	FW	(Ivory Coast) Rémi Adiko	ES Sétif	€ 50K	1 August 2009

=== Out ===
#	Pos	Player	To	Fee	Date
03	DF	(Egypt) Osama Hassan	Al Ittihad	Free	3 June 2009
08	MF	(Egypt) Alaa Abdel-Ghany	Zamalek(coach)	Retired	3 June 2009
29	FW	(Ivory Coast) Koffi Ole	TBD	Free	3 June 2009
10	FW	(Egypt) Gamal Hamza	FSV Mainz 05	Free	20 June 2009
05	MF	(Egypt) Mahmoud Samir	Al Mokawloon	Free	24 June 2009
30	MF	(Egypt) Alaa Kamal	Al Mokawloon	Free	24 June 2009
23	MF	(Egypt) Mohamed Abdullah	Al Ittihad	Free	25 June 2009
27	MF	(Egypt) Mohamed Ibrahim	Al Ittihad	Free	25 June 2009
11	MF	(Egypt) Mohamed Aboul Ela	El-Entag El-Harby	Free	25 June 2009
24	FW	(Egypt) Abdel Halim Ali	Zamalek(assistant coach)	Retired	27 June 2009

=== Loan ===
Pos	Player	To	Fee	Date
FW	(Egypt) Mohamed El Morsy	Al Ittihad	€ 32K	20 June 2009
MF	(Egypt) Ayman Abdel Aziz	Diyarbakırspor	€ 500K	26 July 2009
MF	(Egypt) Ahmed Tharwat	El-Entag El-Harby	Free	31 July 2009

=== Overall ===
This section displays the club's financial expenditure's in the transfer market. Because all transfer fee's are not disclosed to the public, the numbers displayed in this section are only based on figures released by media outlets.

==== Spending ====
Summer: ▼£976,598

Winter: ▲£0

Total: ▼£976,598

==== Income ====
Summer: ▲£454,152

Winter: ▲£0

Total: ▲£454,152

==== Expenditure ====
Summer: ▼£522,446

Winter: ▲£0

Total: ▼£522,446

== Statistics ==
=== Appearances and goals ===
No.	Pos	Nat	Player	Total		Egyptian Premier League		Egypt Cup	
No.	Pos	Nat	Player	Apps	Goals	Apps	Goals	Apps	Goals
1	GK	(Egypt) EGY	Mohamed Abdel Monsef	2	0	1+1	0	0+0	0
2	DF	(Egypt) EGY	Amr El-Safty	0	0	0+0	0	0+0	0
3	DF	(Egypt) EGY	Sabry Raheel	0	0	0+0	0	0+0	0
5	MF	(Egypt) EGY	Ibrahim Salah	0	0	0+0	0	0+0	0
6	DF	(Egypt) EGY	Hany Said	2	0	2+0	0	0+0	0
7	DF	(Egypt) EGY	Ahmed Ghanem Soltan	1	0	1+0	0	0+0	0
8	MF	(Egypt) EGY	Hassan Mostafa	2	0	2+0	0	0+0	0
9	FW	(Egypt) EGY	Amr Zaki	2	0	2+0	0	0+0	0
10	MF	(Egypt) EGY	Mahmoud Abdel-Razek "Shikabala"	2	2	2+0	2	0+0	0
11	FW	(Egypt) EGY	Ahmed Gaafar	2	0	2+0	0	0+0	0
12	MF	(Egypt) EGY	Ahmed El Merghany	2	1	0+2	1	0+0	0
13	DF	(Egypt) EGY	Mohamed Abdel-Shafy	2	0	2+0	0	0+0	0
14	FW	(Egypt) EGY	Ahmed Hossam "Mido"	1	0	0+1	0	0+0	0
15	DF	(Egypt) EGY	Amr Adel	0	0	0+0	0	0+0	0
16	GK	(Egypt) EGY	Abdelwahed El-Sayed	1	0	1+0	0	0+0	0
17	MF	(Egypt) EGY	Alaa Ali	0	0	0+0	0	0+0	0
18	DF	(Egypt) EGY	Hazem Mohamed Emam	1	0	1+0	0	0+0	0
19	FW	(Egypt) EGY	Sayed Mosaad	1	0	0+1	0	0+0	0
20	DF	(Egypt) EGY	Mahmoud Fathallah	2	1	2+0	1	0+0	0
21	GK	(Egypt) EGY	Emad El-Sayed	0	0	0+0	0	0+0	0
22	DF	(Egypt) EGY	Ahmed Magdy	2	0	2+0	0	0+0	0
26	MF	(Egypt) EGY	Ahmed Abdel-Raouf	1	0	1+0	0	0+0	0
30	MF	(Ghana) GHA	Abdul Rahim Ayew	0	0	0+0	0	0+0	0
32	FW	(Egypt) EGY	Sherif Ashraf	0	0	0+0	0	0+0	0
34	FW	(Ivory Coast) CIV	Rémi Adiko	0	0	0+0	0	0+0	0

=== Scorers ===
Includes all competitive matches.

Position	Nation	Number	Name	Egyptian Premier League	Egypt Cup	Total
FW	(Egypt)	11	Ahmed Gaafar	8	1	9
MF	(Egypt)	10	Shikabala	7	0	7
DF	(Egypt)	20	Mahmoud Fathallah	5	0	5
FW	(Egypt)	4	Sherif Ashraf	4	0	4
DF	(Egypt)	2	Ahmed Magdy	2	0	2
DF	(Egypt)	18	Hazem Mohamed Emam	2	0	2
MF	(Qatar)	14	Hussein Yasser	1	1	2
MF	(Egypt)	17	Alaa Ali	2	0	2
FW	(Egypt)	14 (prev.)	Mido	2	0	2
MF	(Ghana)	30	Abdul Rahim Ayew	1	0	1
MF	(Egypt)	12	Ahmed El Merghany	1	0	1
MF	(Egypt)	36	Hossam Arafat	1	0	1
MF	(Egypt)	8	Hassan Mostafa	1	0	1
FW	(Ivory Coast)	23	Rémi Adiko	1	0	1
FW	(Egypt)	19	Sayed Mosaad	1	0	1
FW	(Egypt)	2	Amr El-Safty	1	0	1
DF	(Egypt)	13	Mohamed Abdel-Shafy	1	0	1
/	/	/	Own Goals	2	0	2
			TOTALS	43	2	45

=== Disciplinary record ===
Includes all competitive matches. Players with 1 card or more included only.

Last updated on 21 August

Position	Nation	Number	Name	Egyptian Premier League		Egypt Cup		Total	
Position	Nation	Number	Name	Booked	Sent off (straight red)	Booked	Sent off (straight red)	Booked	Sent off (straight red)
MF	(Egypt)	12	Merghany	1	0	0	0	1	0
DF	(Egypt)	18	Hazem Emam	1	0	0	0	1	0

* = 1 suspension withdrawn
** = 2 suspensions withdrawn
*** = 3 suspensions withdrawn

=== Overall ===
Games played	32 (30 Egyptian Premier League) (2 Egypt Cup)
Games won	17 (16 Egyptian Premier League) (1 Egypt Cup)
Games drawn	7 (7 Egyptian Premier League)
Games lost	8 (7 Egyptian Premier League) (1 Egypt Cup)
Goals scored	45 (43 Egyptian Premier League) (2 Egypt Cup)
Goals conceded	29 (26 Egyptian Premier League) (3 Egypt Cup)
Goal difference	+17
Yellow cards	2
Red cards	0
Worst discipline	
Best result	4-1 (H) v Asyut Petroleum – Egyptian Premier League – 2010-05-13
Worst result	1-3 v Al-Ahly – Egypt Cup – Round of 16 – 2010-05-26
Most appearances	
Top scorer	(Egypt) Ahmed Gaafar (9 goals)
Points	55/90 (61.1%)

== Competitions ==
=== Overall ===
Competition	Started round	Current position / round	Final position / round	First match	Last match
Egyptian Premier League	—	2nd		7 Aug 2009	9 May 2010
Egypt Cup	—	Eliminated from Round of 16			

Updated to match played 11 August
Source: Competitions

=== League ===
==== League table ====
Pos	Team	Pld	W	D	L	GF	GA	GD	Pts	Qualification or relegation
1	Al Ahly (C)	30	18	11	1	47	23	+24	65	2011 CAF Champions League
2	Zamalek	30	16	7	7	43	26	+17	55	2011 CAF Champions League
3	Ismaily	30	11	15	4	34	25	+9	48	2011 CAF Confederation Cup

Source: FIFA.com
(C) Champions

==== League matches ====
Match	Date	Opponents	Home result	Away result	Scorers
1	7 August 2009 (Away)	ENPPI	2 – 0	3 – 1	Mahmoud Fathalla 35', Shikabala 69', Ahmed El Merghany 94'
2	20 August 2009 (Home)	Petrojet	1 – 2	3 – 2	Shikabala 1'
3	24 August 2009 (Away)	Al-Mokawloon al-Arab	0 – 1	2 – 2
4	10 September 2009 (Home)	Al-Itthad Al-Iskandary	1 – 0	2 – 1
5	17 September 2009 (Away)	El-Jaish	0 – 1	1 – 0
6	22 September 2009 (Home)	Ismaily	0 – 1	0 – 0
7	20 October 2009 (Away)	El Gouna FC	1 – 1	1 – 0
8	24 October 2009 (Home)	El-Entag El-Harby	3 – 2	2 – 0
9	29 October 2009 (Away)	Ghazl El-Mehalla	0 – 1	1 – 0
10	2 November 2009 (Home)	Ittihad El-Shorta	0 – 2	1 – 1
11	21 November 2009 (Away)	Haras El Hodood	1 – 2	1 – 2
12	29 November 2009 (Home)	El Ahly	0 – 0	3 – 3
13	3 December 2009 (Away)	El Masry	3 – 0	3 – 1
14	9 December 2009 (Home)	Asyut Petroleum	2 – 0	4 – 1
15	15 December 2009 (Away)	El Mansoura SC	1 – 0	0 – 0

==== Matches ====
2008-10-21
19:15

Zamalek	3 – 1	ENPPI
Emam (yellow card) 6'; Fathallah 35'; Shikabala 69'; Merghany 94'; Merghany (yellow card) 94'	(Report)	A. Ragab (yellow card) 27'; Gomaa (yellow card) 38'; Mano (yellow card) 68'; O. Ragab (yellow card) 85'; Al-Muhammadi 88'

Osman Ahmed Osman Stadium, Cairo
2008-10-21
19:15

Zamalek	1 – 2	Petrojet
Shikabala 1'	(Report)	M. Shaaban (yellow card) 45'; Hamdy 58'; A.Shaaban (yellow card) 72'; Kondi (yellow card) 74'; Walid 90'

Osman Ahmed Osman Stadium, Cairo

See 2009–10 Egypt Cup for more details.
