= 2008 Egypt Cup final =

- Event: 2007–08 Egypt Cup
Zamalek	ENPPI
2	1
- Date: 25 May 2008
- Venue: Cairo Stadium, Cairo
- Referee: Dimitrios Kalopoulos (Greece)
- Attendance: 40,000

2008 Egypt Cup final, was the final match of 2007–08 Egypt Cup, when Zamalek played ENPPI at Cairo Stadium in Cairo.

Zamalek won the game 2–1, claiming the cup for the 21st time.

== Route to the final ==
Zamalek		Round	ENPPI
Opponent	Result	2007–08 Egypt Cup	Opponent	Result
Kahrbaa Ismailia	3–0	Round of 32	Abu Qair	2–0
Maleyat Kafr El-Zayat	2–0	Round of 16	Asyut Petroleum	2–0
Suez Cement	4–1	Quarterfinals	Al-Ittihad Al-Sakndary	1–0
Haras El-Hodood	2–1	Semifinals	Arab Contractors	3–2

== Game description ==
=== Match details ===
25 May 2008

Zamalek	2–1	ENPPI
Hassan 34' (pen.); Zaki 80'	[[[Category:All articles with unsourced statements]] Report]	Younis 64'

Cairo Stadium
Attendance: 40,000
Referee: Dimitrios Kalopoulos (Greece)

Zamalek	ENPPI

Zamalek:
GK		(Egypt) Mohamed Abdel Monsef
RB		(Egypt) Mahmoud Fathallah
CB		(Egypt) Amr El-Safty
CB		(Egypt) Ahmed Magdy
LB		(Egypt) Mohamed Abdallah		(substituted off) 92'
CM		(Egypt) Mohamed Ibrahim	(yellow card) ?'
CM		(Egypt) Ahmed Abdel-Raouf
RW	3	(Egypt) Osama Hassan	(yellow card) ?'	(substituted off) 67'
AM	18	(Egypt) Shikabala	(yellow card) ?'
LW	9	(Egypt) Amr Zaki	(yellow card) ?'
CF	10	(Egypt) Gamal Hamza	(yellow card) ?'	(substituted off) 86'
Substitutions:
RB	13	(Egypt) Tarek El-Sayed		(substituted in) 67'
CF		(Egypt) Mostafa Gaafar		(substituted in) 86'
DF		(Egypt) Ahmed Hossam	(yellow card) ?'	(substituted in) 92'
Manager:
(Netherlands) Ruud Krol

ENPPI:
GK	33	(Egypt) Amer Amer	(yellow card) ?'
RB		(Mozambique) Mano
CB	15	(Egypt) Mohamed Younis
CB		(Egypt) Mohamed El Zayat		(substituted off) 39'
LB		(Egypt) Ahmed Elmohamady	(yellow card) ?'
CM		(Egypt) Islam Awad
CM		(Egypt) Alaa Issa	(yellow card) ?'	(substituted off) 83'
RW		(Egypt) Abdallah Ragab
AM		(Egypt) Adel Mostafa
LW		(Egypt) Ahmed Raouf		(substituted off) 85'
CF		(Ivory Coast) Vincent Die Foneye
Substitutions:
MF		(Egypt) Amr Fahim		(substituted in) 39'
MF		(Egypt) Ayman Said	(yellow card) ?'	(substituted in) 83'
FW		(Egypt) Ahmed Abd El-Zaher		(substituted in) 85'
Manager:
(Egypt) Anwar Salama

Man of the Match:

Assistant referees:

Fourth official:
