= Mosaad (name) =

Mosaad or Mossad (Arabic: مسعد) is an Egyptian given name and surname.

Notable people with this name include:

- Omar Mosaad (born 1988), Egyptian squash player
- Sayed Mosaad (born 1987), Egyptian footballer
- Ali Gabr Gabr Mossad (born 1989), Egyptian footballer
