= Junior Agogo =

Ghanaian footballer (1979–2019)

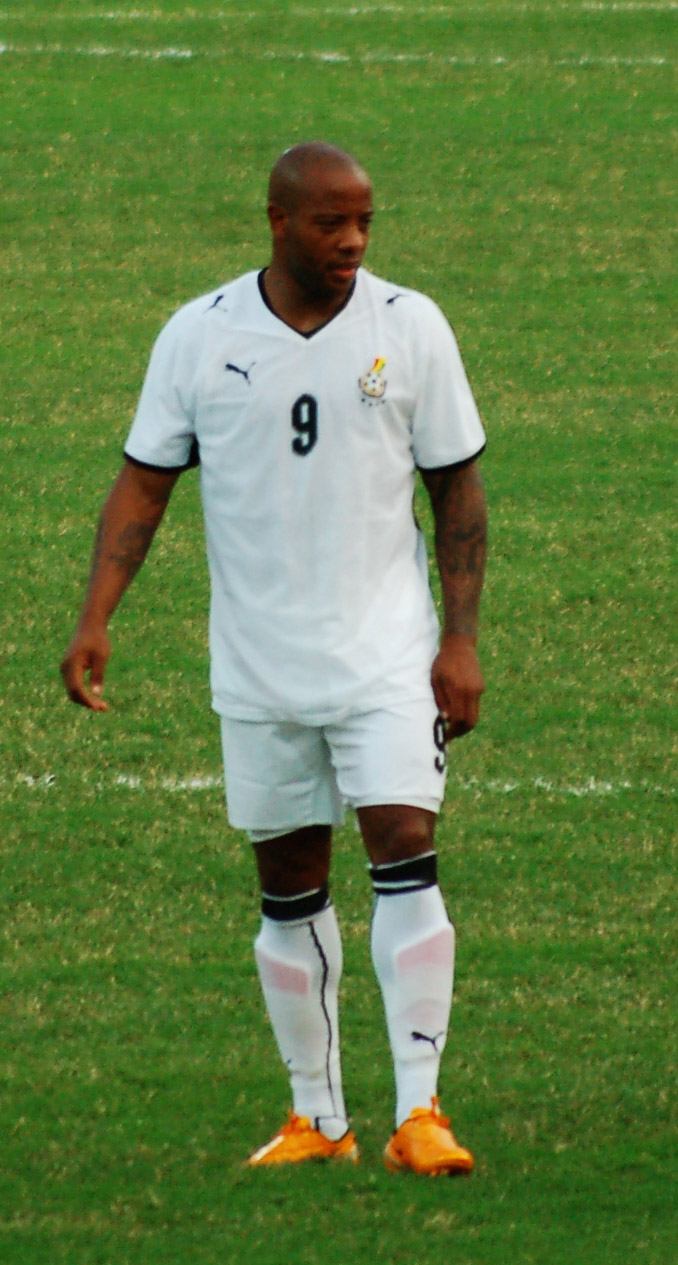
- Agogo playing for Ghana at the 2008 Africa Cup of Nations

Personal information
- Full name: Manuel Agogo
- Date of birth: 1 August 1979
- Place of birth: Accra, Ghana
- Date of death: 22 August 2019 (aged 40)
- Place of death: London, England
- Height: 1.78 m (5 ft 10 in)
- Position: Striker

Youth career
- 1995–1997: Sheffield Wednesday

Senior career*
Years	Team	Apps	(Gls)
1997–2000	Sheffield Wednesday	2	(0)
1999	→ Oldham Athletic (loan)	2	(0)
1999	→ Chester City (loan)	10	(6)
1999	→ Chesterfield (loan)	4	(0)
1999–2000	→ Lincoln City (loan)	3	(1)
2000	Chicago Fire	1	(0)
2000–2001	Colorado Rapids	32	(11)
2001	San Jose Earthquakes	14	(4)
2002	Queens Park Rangers	2	(0)
2002–2003	Barnet	39	(19)
2003–2006	Bristol Rovers	126	(41)
2006–2008	Nottingham Forest	64	(20)
2008–2009	Zamalek SC	15	(4)
2009–2011	Apollon Limassol	24	(6)
2011–2012	Hibernian	12	(1)
Total		350	(113)

International career
2003	England National Game XI	3	(0)
2006–2009	Ghana	27	(12)
- * Club domestic league appearances and goals

Manuel "Junior" Agogo (1 August 1979 – 22 August 2019) was a Ghanaian professional footballer who played as a striker. He was born in Ghana but spent most of his childhood in the UK. He then moved back to Ghana during his years in secondary school. He began his youth career at Sheffield Wednesday in 1995, moving up to the senior squad in 1997. He played for fifteen different clubs over the next fifteen years, before retiring from professional football in 2012. He spent most of his playing career in England, with additional spells in the US, Egypt, Cyprus and Scotland. His longest spell was at Bristol Rovers (2003–2006), where he made 140 appearances and scored over 40 goals before moving to Nottingham Forest.

Agogo played for the Ghana national team between 2006 and 2009. His three goals in the final stages of the 2008 Africa Cup of Nations helped Ghana to a third-place finish, adding to the three club honours he earned during his career. Agogo scored a total of 143 goals during his professional football career. After retiring, he opened his own small group and personal fitness training business.

== Club career ==
=== Sheffield Wednesday ===
Born in Accra, Greater Accra, Agogo began his career at Sheffield Wednesday in 1995, but only made two league appearances for the Premier League side. During the 1999–2000 season he had loan spells at Oldham Athletic, Chester City, Chesterfield, and Lincoln City. His goal for Chester against Cheltenham Town in October 1999, was voted the best goal ever scored at the Deva Stadium.

=== United States ===
In 2000, Agogo left Sheffield Wednesday and moved to the United States to play for the Chicago Fire of Major League Soccer. After playing just one match in Chicago, he was traded to the Colorado Rapids to replace the departed attacker Wolde Harris who had just joined New England Revolution. He went on to score 11 goals in 32 appearances for the Rapids, including 10 goals in his first season to end as the team's top scorer for the season.

He was traded from Colorado to the San Jose Earthquakes in June 2001 for Chris Carrieri. He played for the Earthquakes for the rest of the 2001 season, culminating with their MLS Championship victory, but was waived early in the 2002 pre-season, and replaced on the San Jose roster by Devin Barclay.

=== Back in England ===
In 2002, Agogo returned to England, this time with Queens Park Rangers. He made his debut coming off the bench away against Swindon Town. However, after only two appearances he moved to Football Conference side Barnet.

=== Bristol Rovers ===
In the summer of 2003, Agogo joined Third Division side Bristol Rovers for £110,000 with Giuliano Grazioli going to Barnet in the opposite direction. He played the first thirteen games of the 2003–04 season before having to have an operation which kept him out for the next nine games. He finished the campaign with six goals in all competitions. In the 2004–05 season, Agogo scored 20 goals in 51 appearances; the following season he scored 18 goals from 44 appearances. In total he scored 41 goals in 126 matches, the highest during his entire playing career.

=== Nottingham Forest ===
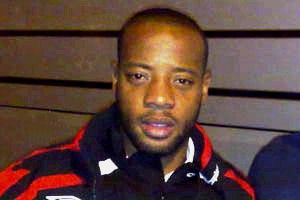
Agogo with Nottingham Forest in 2007

In summer 2006 Rovers turned down initial bids from Agogo from Championship side Southend United and League One side Nottingham Forest Agogo had a clause in his contract allowing him to speak to other clubs if an acceptable bid was made. On 30 August 2006 the transfer to Forest was completed for an undisclosed fee, with Agogo signing a three-year contract. In September 2006 he made his league debut for Forest as a sub in a 4–0 home win against Chesterfield. He scored seven league goals over the season, with his first on 30 September 2006 against Swansea City in a 3–1 win.

On 22 September 2007 Agogo scored his first goals of the 2007–08 season, a hat-trick in a 4–0 win over Gillingham – the first of his career. He netted two long-range strikes that season with a 35-yard lob of the goalkeeper in Forest's 3–0 win at Yeovil Town and a 25-yard effort in Forest's 4–1 success against Southend United. However, Agogo scored only three goals after his return from the 2008 Africa Cup of Nations, one of which was against Leyton Orient at Brisbane Road. He finished as Forest's top-scorer that season with thirteen goals, helping the club gain automatic promotion to the Championship.

=== Zamalek ===
On 2 July 2008, Agogo joined Zamalek SC, He initially wore the number 29 jersey, but switched to number 9 following Amr Zaki's departure on loan to English side Wigan Athletic.

=== Apollon Limassol ===
Agogo joined Apollon Limassol on 5 August 2009, signing a two-year contract with the Cypriots.

=== Hibernian ===
Agogo signed a one-year contract with Scottish Premier League club Hibernian, who were then managed by his former Nottingham Forest manager Colin Calderwood, in July 2011. Agogo scored his first goal for Hibs on 24 September 2011, in a 3–3 draw against Dundee United. He was released from his contract in January 2012, after making 14 appearances for the club.

== International career ==
In May 2006, Agogo was called up by Ghana for a friendly against French league side OGC Nice. However, he was not included in the final Ghanaian World Cup squad. He was recalled to the Ghana squad for an East Asia tour in which he faced Japan and South Korea.

On 14 November 2006, Agogo scored his first goal for Ghana, the equaliser in a friendly against Australia; the game finished 1–1. He also scored the third goal in Ghana's 4–1 victory over Nigeria, played at Brentford's Griffin Park.

Agogo was called up to the Ghana squad for the 2008 Africa Cup of Nations. He played in the first game of the cup against Guinea, hitting the post with a header in the 20th minute and helping Ghana to a 2–1 victory. He then scored in the following game against Namibia, tapping home Michael Essien's cross for the only goal of the game.

Agogo then netted another goal, an 84th minute winner, in the quarter final against Nigeria after John Mensah had been shown a red card in the 60th minute. Ghana missed out on the final, however, and had to settle for a third-place play-off against Ivory Coast, in which he scored again in a 4–2 victory. Alongside Sulley Muntari he was Ghana's top scorer in the competition, and the 5th highest scorer overall.

In total, Agogo scored 12 goals in 27 matches for the national team between 2006 and 2009.

== Personal life ==
=== Early life and education ===
Junior Agogo was born on 1 August 1979 in Accra, Ghana as one of 11 siblings. He attended the Ridge Church School in Accra, but before completing primary school, he moved with his family to the UK. He subsequently returned to Ghana for three years, attending St. Augustine's College, an all-boys Catholic boarding secondary school in Cape Coast. He did not play on the football team at St Augustine's College, but instead represented the school in dancing competitions. Agogo was the nephew of JJ Rawlings.

=== Other hobbies ===
It was not until his family moved to the UK that he discovered his love and talent for football while playing with his siblings and friends. Agogo's father, Mr Emmanuel Agogo, a businessman, encouraged him to study instead of playing sports.

During an interview in 2008, Agogo revealed that he planned to open his own restaurant after his football career. However, Agogo instead started his own fitness training business.

=== Later life and death ===
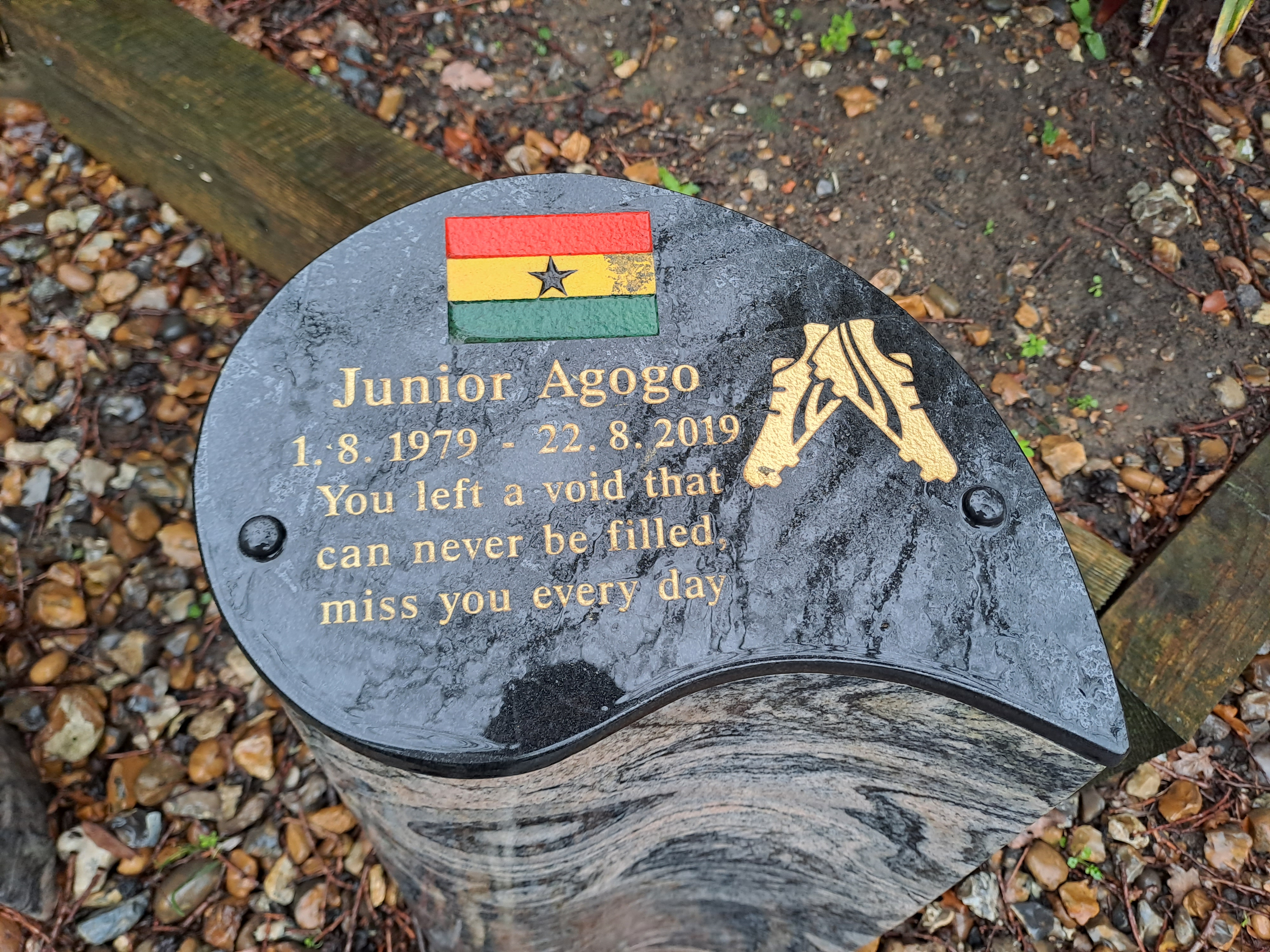
Memorial in Golders Green Crematorium, London

On 29 January 2015, Agogo was hospitalised after suffering a stroke. He struggled with his speech after his stroke and expressed anxiety at his language problems. Agogo died in London on 22 August 2019, aged 40. On 20 September 2019, Agogo's remains were cremated in London after a private funeral ceremony at St Mark's Church. He is remembered with a memorial at Golders Green Crematorium in London.

On 26 August 2019, four days after his death, Nottingham Forest fans paid tribute to the striker in the 23rd minute of their match against Derby County in the Carabao Cup. Agogo wore the number 23 jersey during their League One promotion campaign.

Bristol Rovers players wore number 9 shirts adorned with Agogo's name during their warm-up before their match against Oxford United on 24 August 2019. Prior to kick-off, both sets of players stood around the centre circle and applauded for a minute while the message "RIP Junior Agogo" was displayed on the scoreboard. Fans also sang and chanted his name.

== Honours ==
San Jose Earthquakes

- MLS Cup: 2001

Nottingham Forest

- League One second-place promotion: 2007–08

Apollon Limassol

- Cypriot Cup: 2009–10

Ghana

- Africa Cup of Nations third place: 2008

Individual

- Barnet Player of the Year: 2002–03
- Football Conference Team of the Year: 2002–03
