= Shikabala =

Egyptian footballer (born 1986)

Shikabala شيكابالا
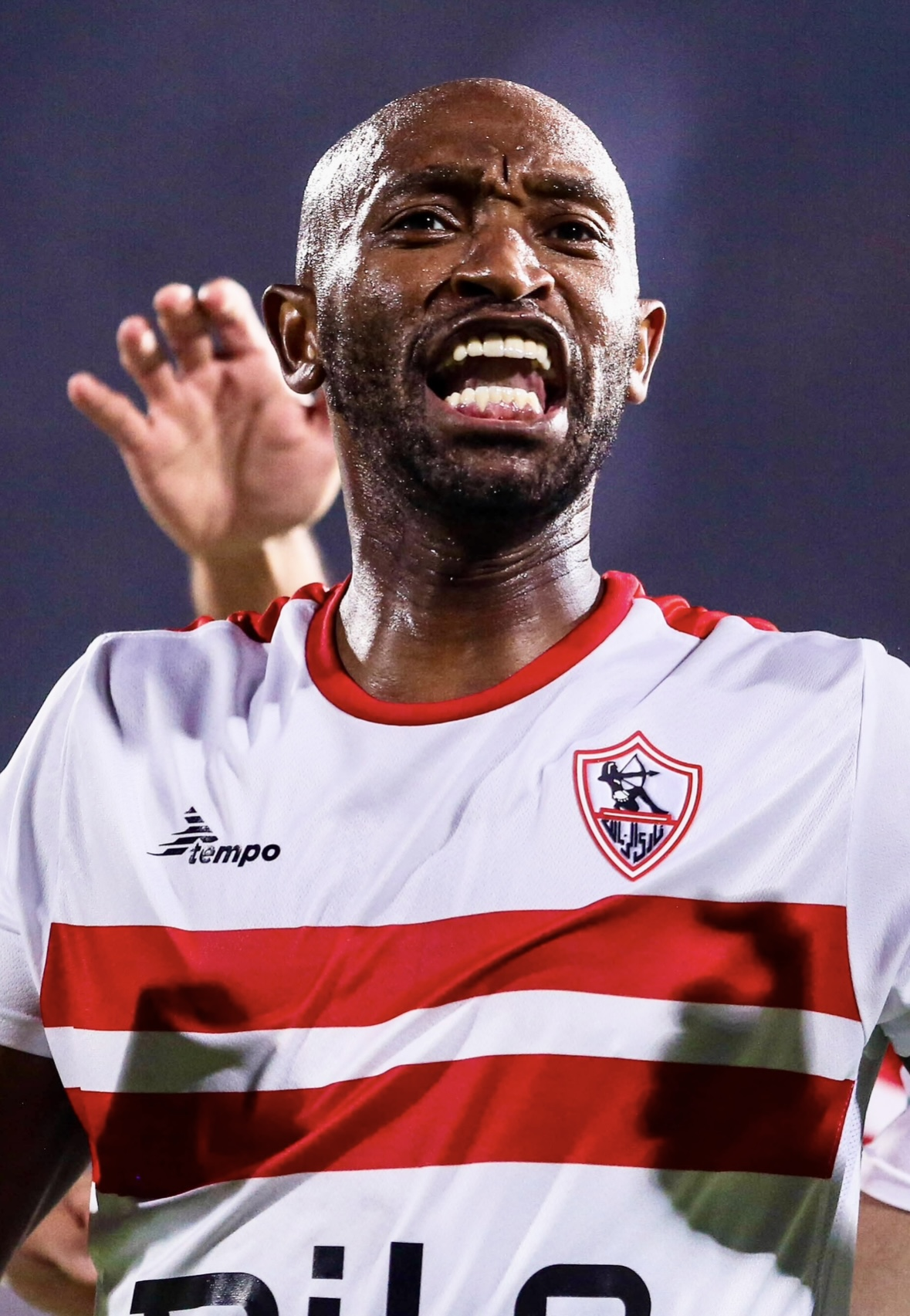
- Shikabala with Zamalek in 2021

Personal information
- Full name: Mahmoud Abdelrazek Hassan Fadlala
- Date of birth: 5 March 1986 (age 40)
- Place of birth: Edfu, Aswan, Egypt
- Height: 1.83 m (6 ft 0 in)
- Position: Forward

Youth career
- 1995–1996: Aswan
- 1996–2002: Zamalek

Senior career*
Years	Team	Apps	(Gls)
2002–2005	Zamalek	22	(0)
2005–2006	PAOK	23	(4)
2006–2014	Zamalek	112	(34)
2012–2013	→ Al Wasl (loan)	13	(4)
2014–2015	Sporting CP	1	(0)
2014	Sporting CP B	5	(0)
2015–2025	Zamalek	135	(21)
2015–2016	→ Ismaily (loan)	8	(2)
2017–2018	→ Al-Raed (loan)	21	(9)
2018–2019	→ Apollon Smyrnis (loan)	10	(1)
Total		350	(75)

International career
2005	Egypt U20	4	(1)
2007–2018	Egypt	32	(2)
Medal record
Men's football
Representing Egypt
Africa Cup of Nations
Winner	2010 Angola
African Youth Championship
Runner-up	2005 Benin
- * Club domestic league appearances and goals as of 17 January 2025

Mahmoud Abdelrazek Hassan Fadlala (Arabic: محمود عبد الرازق حسن فضل الله IPA: [mæħˈmuːd ʕæbdelˈɾæːzeʔ, -eɾˈɾæː- fɑdˈlɑllɑ]; born 5 March 1986), nicknamed Shikabala (Arabic: شيكابالا IPA: [ʃikæˈbæːlæ]), is an Egyptian former professional footballer who played as a forward. He is considered one of the best Egyptian football players of all time, having been named "Best Player in Egypt" in numerous polls on various football seasons. His playing style is characterized by dribbling, penetrating, playmaking, and shooting powerfully from long range with his left foot.

He began his football career with the Zamalek youth team before joining the first team. He then joined PAOK of Greece, and Sporting Lisbon of Portugal. He then moved on loan to Al-Wasl of the UAE, Ismaily of Egypt, Al-Raed of Saudi Arabia, and finally Apollon Smyrnis F.C. of Greece, before returning to Zamalek. At international level, he was part of the Egyptian squad that won the 2010 Africa Cup of Nations and also represented his country at the 2018 FIFA World Cup. Shikabala won 18 titles with Zamalek through his illustrious career as a football player. He announced his retirement from professional football in July 2025. He is nicknamed the "Apache" by Egyptian fans, also his nickname "Shikabala" originates from Zambian striker Webster Chikabala.

== Club career ==
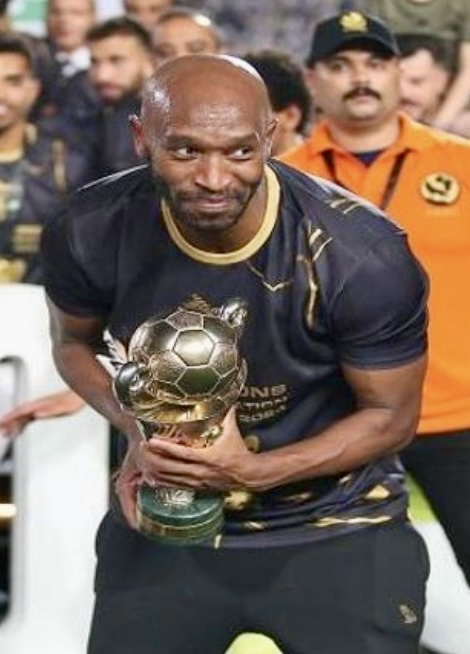
Shikabala, Zamalek's captain, holding the CAF Confederation Cup trophy in 2024

=== Early career ===
Shikabala joined the youth academy of Zamalek SC at 8 and made his first team appearance in a cup match early in 2002, scoring the winning goal at the age of 16. He remained with the first team squad since then but had very limited playing time and no professional contract, which is why he was able to leave Zamalek and join PAOK FC in January 2005 for no transfer fee. He enjoyed one relatively successful season with PAOK; however, despite the Greek club being adamant that he would remain at the club until the end of his contract in 2009, Shikabala subsequently returned to Egypt in 2006 for military service.

=== Zamalek ===
When Shikabala initially returned to Egypt from Greece in January 2007, it was amidst controversy as he signed for arch rivals Al Ahly. "I wanted to return to Zamalek," Shikabala later recalled, "but at this time they had many administrative problems and they refused to sign me." After the best transfer went viral, Zamalek chairman Mamdouh Abbas and teammate Gamal Hamza were able to convince Shikabala to return to Zamalek. Shikabala enjoyed a phenomenal start with Zamalek scoring once again on his second debut for the club the winner in a 1–0 match. Shika quickly carved a place for himself in Henri Michel's starting line-up gradually replacing club legend and fans' idol Hazem Emam. On 2 July 2007, Shikabala scored his first goal in the Cairo derby against Al Ahly in the cup final which ended 4–3 for Al Ahly. By the start of the 2007–08 season Shikabala had already become the ultimate fan favorite for the curva sud section which belongs to the Zamalek supporters. The fans sang his name before every game and had special chants solely for him. He enjoyed a mixed season where Zamalek struggled in the league, and he faced a lengthy ban after Al Ahly fans chanted profanities against him in the 100th Cairo derby leading to him responding by lifting his shoes to them. He finished the season on a brighter note though as Zamalek finished as cup winners which was the club's first trophy in 4 years.

Shikabala missed the start of the 2008–09 season due to a ban by FIFA for his illegal transfer to Zamalek. He returned in late November in fine form but once again Zamalek endured an uninspiring season and finished 6th in the league. The following season was no different until Zamalek appointed Hossam Hassan in December 2009 who gradually lifted the team from obscurity into consistently challenging for trophies once again. Under the guidance of Hassan, Shikabala finally matured as a player and started to live up to his potential. Before that he was very inconsistent and despite scoring fantastic goals and making fancy dribbles, used to drift in an out of games and was largely ineffective at times.

In 2010–11, Shikabala and Hassan led Zamalek to the top of the table for the first time in years. Zamalek would stay on the top until the closing stages of the season where they crumbled and Al Ahly ended up as the league winners for the 7th season in a row, despite that Shikabala finished the season as top scorer with 13 goals and had two magical assists against Al Ahly in the derby.

Shikabala has been a Zamalek fan favorite and the team's biggest star since returning to the team in 2007. The ultras adore him and the management refused numerous offers for him notably from Anderlecht and made him the highest paid player in the history of Egypt. Shikabala has been famous for his skills against alahly the fans adore him and the entire team is built around him. But his latest act of indiscipline was against former coach and club icon Hassan Shehata when he inexplicably had an altercation with him after being substituted. Shehata decided to freeze him out of the squad and asked to have him sold immediately, though the Zamalek board has been hesitant so far and are trying to find a solution to keep Shikabala with Zamalek. On 27 June 2012, Zamalek had agreed to a loan offer from Italian Serie A side Napoli for 1.8 million Euros (13.5 million Egyptian pounds). The loan deal would last one year, with the option to permanently sign Shikabala after the 2012–13 season. A few days later, Napoli failed to comment on the deal and this sparked controversy. Napoli stated that they only have interest in the player but they hadn't made a formal offer while the Napoli coach stated they know nothing about the deal. Reports in the Italian media revealed that this is just another rumour that even Italian mercato expert Gianluca Di Marzio has called it an "April fool that is two months late". Zamalek then stated that Napoli had failed to send agent to Cairo to officially sign Shikabala on the agreed upon deadline and the deal fell through. There was still speculation over whether Napoli would send an official offer for Shikabala throughout the 2012 summer transfer window. Several reports stated that Qatari Lekhwiya SC, Saudi Al Shabab and Ittihad Jeddah, Romanian Vaslui, German VfB Stuttgart, Spanish Espanyol, Napoli and their Italian counterparts Udinese were all battling for Shikabala's signature.

==== Loan to Al Wasl ====
In late July, Emirate side Al Wasl offered 600,000 Euros for a one-year loan offer for Shikabala, however Zamalek refused the bid asking for $1.5 million US. After long negotiations between Zamalek and Al Wasl, Shikabala was officially loaned to Al Wasl for one year at a fee of $1.25 million US. Shikabala had chosen the number 10, the number he previously had at Zamalek. On his unofficial debut in a friendly match against Omani club side Al Shabab, he assisted both of Al Wasl's goals in a 2–2 draw. His official debut was against Ittihad Kalba in the Emirates Cup where he put in a man of the match performance in 4–2 win for Al Wasl. He scored from a free-kick in the second half and assisted for 2 other goals. On his league debut against Al-Wahda, he scored one and assisted one in Al Wasl's 4–1 win. He also netted against Ajman in a 2–0 win, scoring a very nice second goal. After former Al-Wasl coach Bruno Metsu stepped down from coaching Al Wasl due to stomach cancer, Shikabala scored the game right after his resignation against Al Dhafra and he immediately went to a picture of Metsu on the sides and kissed the picture of Metsu on the cheek, then patting the "get well soon" message on the board. Shikabala's tribute to Metsu earned the praise of Al Wasl fans, and Emirate people and media.

However, it wasn't long after that when Shikabala was involved in his first controversy with the club. After a crushing 5–0 loss to fellow league club Al Ain, Shikabala appeared a few days later with Egyptian super star singer Tamer Hosny, during one of his concerts in the UAE. This caused the outrage of many Al Wasl fans and the disappointment of the club's board, especially in light of his club suffering the worst defeat of the year.

Shikabala continued as one of the teams stars as he picked up an assist in almost every match he played. In a match against Bani Yas, which had fellow Egyptian star Mohamed Zidan in their ranks. Shikabala scored in the 1–3 loss to Bani Yas and oddly enough, both players left the match with serious injuries. Shikabala was left out for a month with a thigh injury. Shikabala travelled to Egypt to get his treatment back home but he failed to return to Dubai on time when he was supposed to. The club was disappointed with his late return, which came days after originally anticipated. After weeks of speculation and rumors, Al Wasl had ended Shikabala's loan contract from Zamalek.

=== Return to Zamalek ===
Upon his controversial return from Al Wasl, Shikabala was unable to play for Zamalek for the rest of the 2012–13 season as his loan move outside of CAF restricted him from playing again for Zamalek until the following season. On 29 March 2013, English side Nottingham Forest Club president Fawaz Al-Hasawi expressed great interest in signing the player in the summer of 2013.

Even though Shikabala was unable to play for the club, the Zamalek board had demanded that he train with the team but head coach Jorvan Vieira had refused since he didn't want someone in the team's training "that would not be able to play." As of 1 July 2013, Shikabala's loan from Al Wasl would have ended, granting him the ability to play for Zamalek once more. Shikabala made his return debut on 24 July 2013 CAF Champions League match against Al Ahly in the 57th minute. He would go on to play all 6 matches in the group stage of the Champions League scoring 2 goals and assisting 2 goals. Zamalek would then participate in the 2013 Egypt Cup. Playing the full 90 minutes in all 4 matches, Shikabala would lead Zamalek to the cup title after a 3–0 win against Wadi Degla. Shikabala had 4 assists and scored 1 goal, which was the final goal of the 3–0 win in the final from a wonderfully taken free-kick from over 30 yards out, in the tournament. 10 games after returning from Al Wasl, Shikabala scored 3 goals and had 6 assists.

As the 2013–14 Egyptian Premier League season was approaching in late December 2013, Shikabala caused yet more controversy by not showing up for training and threatening to terminate his contract with Zamalek unless he was paid his late wages over the past 3 years (from January 2011 to January 2014), which all accumulated to about 5.5 million Egyptian Pounds (almost 791,000 US dollars). On 5 January 2014, Shikabala officially terminated his contract with Zamalek as the Zamalek board was unable to both pay his late wages and convince him to stay at the club. Many of the Zamalek fans were angry with Shikabala's abrupt departure. There were many rumors however linking Shikabala to many clubs in Europe after putting fine displays for Zamalek over the years and during his loan spell at Al Wasl. After weeks of speculation about resigning for Zamalek or leaving, Shikabala, due to his love for his boyhood club, decided to sign with Zamalek and leave through the club so that Zamalek can benefit financially from his sale to help solve the financial problems the club was facing. The Zamalek board agreed to sell Shikabala at the end of the January transfer window for the proper price.

=== Sporting CP ===
On 29 January 2014, it was announced that Shikabala signed for the Portuguese club Sporting CP for 700,000 dollars and would travel the following day to Lisbon to complete a medical and officially sign with the club. In the final hours of the January transfer window, there were several problems with the negotiations between Shikabala, Sporting, and Zamalek but with 3 minutes remaining in the transfer window, they finally agreed to a deal of 700,000 US dollars in addition to 5% of any future sale if Sporting decide to sell Shikabala to another club. Shikabala decided to wear the number 7 jersey in Sporting. Shikabala made his first appearance for the reserve team on 16 February 2014 against Tondela. He started the match but was substituted 28 minutes into the game after picking up a minor ankle injury.

Shikabala made very few appearances for the team and was benched for a huge amount of the following season, only making a few appearances for the reserve team and one appearance in the first team.

His most notable contribution was his goal against Azores XI during the Pedro Pauleta Trophy, ending the tournament with a 2–1 for Sporting CP and smashing the record number of live viewers through the club's official website.

His Portuguese representative, Paulo Faria, made a lot of negative remarks about his behavior since their friendly match with Ittihad Alexandria in early August 2014. The club have since issued a statement on their website, defending Shikabala.

In September 2014, Shikabala went to Egypt to play for his national team, since then he did not return to Sporting or to Portugal. His salary was frozen and his house and car were taken due to lack of payments.

=== Second return to Zamalek and loan to Ismaily ===
On 27 August 2015, Zamalek officially signed Shikabala after his unsuccessful attempt with Portuguese side Sporting. "Zamalek chairman Mortada Mansour has approved a five-season contract deal with the player," the club's official website stated. He was immediately loaned to Egyptian league side Ismaily SC as there was no place for the player in Zamalek's closed squad. Following the 2015–16 season, Shikabla completed his loan and returned to Zamalek as the team captain.

==== Loans to Al-Raed and Apollon Smyrnis ====
After a loan spell at Saudi Arabian club Al-Raed in 2017–18, where he made an impressively good performance finishing the season scoring 11 goals for his club. Shikabala was loaned to Apollon Smyrnis of the Greek Super League in August 2018.

=== Third return to Zamalek and retirement ===
On 30 June 2019, Shikabala returned to Zamalek after the end of his loan to Apollon Smyrnis. In his third spell with his home team, he won the Egyptian Premier League in 2020–21 and 2021–22 seasons. He also won with Zamalek the Egyptian Super Cup in 2019–20 and the Egypt Cup in 2021. At the continental level, he won with Zamalek the CAF Super Cup in 2020 and the CAF Confederation Cup in 2023–24.

He won with Zamalek the 2024 CAF Super Cup, after beating Al Ahly 4–3 in a penalty shootout after a 1–1 draw at Kingdom Arena in Riyadh, Saudi Arabia in the famous match known as the African Super of the Century, to mark Shikabala's third and Zamalek's fifth title of the CAF Super Cup. His final trophy with the White Castle was the 2024–25 Egypt Cup title. On 3 July 2025, Shikabala announced his retirement from professional football. The Egyptian star who garnered 18 title with his home team Zamalek, announced the retirement in an emotional televised interview, where the "Apache" struggled to hold back tears while declaring his retirement ending an illustrious career spanning for over two decades.

== International career ==
Shikabala made his international debut on 3 June 2007 in an Africa Cup of Nations qualification match against Mauritania. While he has never played a major role on the national team, Shikabala has made several appearances during key parts of Egypt's recent history. He was part of Egypt's squad in the 2010 African Cup of Nations, featuring in one match as Egypt ended up as winners for the seventh time and third in a row. He decided to resign from international football in 2010, citing racist insults that he had endured from Al Ahly fans during the Cairo derby and saying that he did not want to confront such situations in international games. However, on 8 August 2012, he was called up by manager Bob Bradley for friendly matches against Benin and Cameroon.

After being featured in the squad for Egypt's 2014 African Nations Championship qualifying campaign, Shikabala endured a three-year absence from the national team. He returned to the squad on 12 November 2017, where he scored his second official international goal against Ghana in Egypt's final World Cup qualifier. In June 2018, Shikabala was named to Egypt for the 2018 FIFA World Cup in Russia.

== Style of play ==
Shikabala was not a traditional winger, he usually played in a free role, either as a forward and an attacking midfielder behind the forwards, or as a second striker in a front–two. Described as a "classic number 10", He was renowned for his dribbling ability, vision, close ball control, passing and creativity. He scored many goals from powerful shots outside the box with his left foot. He was also a generous assistant for his teammates. His style is characterized by skillful close control and using trickery to get past opponents, rather than relying solely on pace. Shikabala is renowned for his ability to weave past defenders, often using small touches and tricks. While his skills are undeniable, he has also been described as potentially volatile.

== Career statistics ==
=== Club ===
As of 3 July 2025

Appearances and goals by club, season and competition
Club	Season	League			Cup		Continental		Other		Total	
Club	Season	Division	Apps	Goals	Apps	Goals	Apps	Goals	Apps	Goals	Apps	Goals
Zamalek	2002–03	EPL	6	0	3	2	4	0	1	0	14	2
Zamalek	2003–04	EPL	7	0	2	0	0	0	1	1	10	1
Zamalek	2004–05	EPL	9	0	2	0	0	0	3	2	14	2
Zamalek	2006–07	EPL	8	3	3	2	0	0	0	0	11	5
Zamalek	2007–08	EPL	22	5	2	0	3	1	0	0	27	6
Zamalek	2008–09	EPL	16	3	0	0	0	0	0	0	16	3
Zamalek	2009–10	EPL	25	7	2	0	0	0	0	0	27	7
Zamalek	2010–11	EPL	27	13	5	1	4	2	0	0	36	16
Zamalek	2011–12	EPL	14	3	0	0	3	0	0	0	18	3
Zamalek	2012–13	EPL	0	0	4	1	6	2	0	0	10	3
Zamalek	2015–16	EPL	17	1	4	1	9	1	0	0	38	3
Zamalek	2016–17	EPL	25	5	3	0	7	0	2	1	37	6
Zamalek	2018–19	EPL	0	0	3	0	0	0	1	0	4	0
Zamalek	2019–20	EPL	6	1	3	1	8	2	1	0	18	4
Zamalek	2020–21	EPL	27	1	3	0	4	0	0	0	34	1
Zamalek	2021–22	EPL	19	2	2	0	5	0	2	0	28	2
Zamalek	2022–23	EPL	21	3	5	1	6	0	0	0	32	5
Zamalek	2023–24	EPL	15	3	1	0	9	2	4	3	29	8
Zamalek	2024–25	EPL	5	0	2	1	2	0	2	0	11	1
Zamalek	Total		277	50	49	10	70	10	17	7	404	77
PAOK	2005–06	SLG	23	4	1	0	4	0	0	0	28	4
Al Wasl	2012–13	UPL	13	4	2	1	—		2	0	17	5
Sporting	2013–14	Primeira Liga	1	0	0	0	—		—		1	0
Sporting B	2013–14	Segunda Liga	5	0	0	0	—		0	0	5	0
Ismaily	2015–16	EPL	8	2	0	0	—		0	0	8	2
Al Raed	2017–18	SPL	21	9	1	1	—		2	1	24	11
Apollon Smyrnis	2018–19	SLG	10	1	1	0	—		0	0	11	1
Career total			359	70	54	12	74	10	21	8	498	100

=== International ===
Appearances and goals by national team and year
National team	Year	Apps	Goals
Egypt	2007	2	1
Egypt	2008	4	0
Egypt	2009	3	0
Egypt	2010	2	0
Egypt	2011	7	0
Egypt	2012	3	0
Egypt	2013	5	0
Egypt	2014	1	0
Egypt	2015	0	0
Egypt	2016	0	0
Egypt	2017	1	1
Egypt	2018	4	0
Total		32	2

Scores and results list Egypt's goal tally first, score column indicates score after each Shikabala goal.

List of international goals scored by Shikabala
No.	Date	Venue	Cap	Opponent	Score	Result	Competition	Ref.
1	12 June 2007	Al-Sadaqua Walsalam Stadium, Kuwait City, Kuwait	2	Kuwait	1–1	1–1	Friendly	
2	12 November 2017	Baba Yara Stadium, Kumasi, Ghana	28	Ghana	1–0	1–1	2018 FIFA World Cup qualification	

== Honours ==
Zamalek

- Egyptian Premier League: 2002–03, 2003–04, 2020–21, 2021–22
- Egypt Cup: 2007–08, 2012–13, 2015–16, 2018–19, 2020–21, 2024–25
- Egyptian Super Cup: 2017, 2020
- CAF Confederation Cup: 2023–24
- CAF Super Cup: 2003, 2020, 2024
- Arab Club Championship: 2003
- Saudi-Egyptian Super Cup: 2003

Egypt

- African Cup of Nations: 2010
- Nile Basin Tournament: 2011

Individual

- Egyptian Premier League top goalscorer: 2010–11 (Shared with Ahmed Abd El-Zaher)
- EFA Egyptian Player of the Year: 2011
