= Antoine N'Gossan =

Ivorian footballer

Personal information
- Full name: Jean-Etienne Antoine N'Gossan
- Date of birth: 30 November 1990 (age 35)
- Place of birth: Abidjan, Ivory Coast
- Height: 1.73 m (5 ft 8 in)
- Position: Midfielder

Youth career
- Académie de Sol Beni

Senior career*
| Years | Team | Apps | (Gls) |
| 2007–2008 | ASEC | | |
| 2009– | Charlton Athletic | | |
| 2009 | → ASEC (loan) | | |
| 2010 | → SV Zulte Waregem (loan) | 0 | (0) |
| 2010 | → ASEC (loan) | | |
| 2011 | ASEC | | |
| 2012 | SOA | | |

International career
| 2005 | Ivory Coast Under-17 | | |
| 2008 | Ivory Coast Under-21 | | |
| 2008 | Ivory Coast Under-23 | 2 | (0) |
- * Club domestic league appearances and goals

Jean-Etienne Antoine N'Gossan (born 30 November 1990) is an Ivorian footballer who plays as a midfielder.

== Club career ==
Born in Abidjan, N'Gossan began his career 2003 at Académie de Sol Beni and was promoted in 2007 to ASEC Mimosas.

Along with Zoro Cyriac Gohi Bi, Troh César Hougnonhouon and Moussa Guindo, N'Gossan moved to Charlton Athletic on 18 January 2009.

In January 2010, he joined Belgian side SV Zulte Waregem on a six-month from ASEC Mimosas with Zulte Waregem given an option to sign him permanently.

After his loan to Zulte Waregem, N'Gossan returned to ASEC Mimosas.

In January 2012 he left ASEC Mimosas and joined with Lamine Sogodogo to SO de l'Armée.

== International career ==
N'Gossan has played with the Ivory Coast Under-17, in the qualification for the 2005 FIFA U-17 World Championship in Peru. He represented his country at the 2008 Olympic Games. With the Ivory Coast Under-21 side, he played at the Toulon Tournament 2008 and participated at the 2009 African Youth Championship.
