= Eugène Koffi Kouamé =

Ivorian footballer

Personal information
- Date of birth: 7 February 1988
- Place of birth: Port-Bouët, Abidjan, Ivory Coast
- Date of death: 10 July 2017 (aged 29)
- Height: 1.83 m (6 ft 0 in)
- Position: Forward

Youth career
- CFAS Port-Bouët

Senior career*
Years	Team	Apps	(Gls)
2006	AS AGIR		
2007	S.O.A.		
2009–2009	Zamalek	3	(0)
2009–2010	ASEC Mimosas		
2010	Séwé Sports		
2010	FC Hiré		
2010	Düzkaya S.K.	2	(1)
2011	Lefke	4	(3)
2011	Boluspor	6	(1)
2012	FC SKA-Energiya Khabarovsk	11	(4)
2013–2014	Lefke		
2014–2015	Gençlik Gücü		
2015	Sarıkamış Belediyespor		
2015–2017	Egirdirspor		
- * Club domestic league appearances and goals

Eugène Koffi Kouamé (7 February 1988 – 10 July 2017) was an Ivorian professional football player.

Kouamé died on 10 July 2017 at the age of 29 after having suffered a heart attack following a game.
