= Omar Rabie Yassin =

Egyptian footballer (born 1988)

Personal information
- Date of birth: August 18, 1988 (age 38)
- Place of birth: Cairo, Egypt
- Height: 1.84 m (6 ft 0 in)
- Position: Left back

Team information
- Current team: RoPS
- Number: 28

Youth career
- Al Ahly

Senior career*
Years	Team	Apps	(Gls)
2006–2007	Al Ahly	0	(0)
2007	→Tersana(Loan)	0	(0)
2008	Lierse S.K.	12	(0)
2008	→K.V. Turnhout(Loan)	?	(?)
2009	El Zamalek	?	(?)
2009–2011	Al-Sekka Al-Hadid	?	(?)
2011	RoPs		

International career
- Egypt U-21
- * Club domestic league appearances and goals

Omar Rabie Yassin (Arabic: عمر ربيع ياسين; born 18 August 1988) is an Egyptian football player who last played as a left back and left winger for Finnish club RoPs. He is the son of Rabie Yassin, the ex-Egyptian football player.

== Career ==
Omar began his career at Egyptian giants Al Ahly's youth team. He received an invitation from Real Madrid but his club refused.

In summer 2007 he was loaned to Tersana first team. In January 2008, he joined Belgian club Lierse. Though he played a number of good games, his agreement at the club was ended by mutual consent, and at his request the contract with Lierse was terminated at the end of October 2008.

He then went back to Egypt and trained with the Egyptian club Petrojet to sign with them. However, Egyptian giants El Zamalek grabbed him and he signed a 4 1/2-year contract in a huge deal that shook Egyptian football. With international left-backs in Zamalek, he decided to join Al-Sekka Al-Hadid to get regular playing time.

In 2010, Finland club FC Lahti wanted to sign Omar after he impressed in pre-season training in Finland, but the transfer didn't work out in the end due to his Egyptian club refusing terms. Omar said to Egyptian media that after going to Finland, his wish is to play there. A year later, he did sign in Finland, joining RoPs.
