= Wisam El Abdy =

Tunisian footballer

Personal information
- Full name: Wissem ben Habib El Abdi
- Date of birth: April 2, 1979 (age 47)
- Place of birth: Sfax, Tunisia
- Height: 1.86 m (6 ft 1 in)
- Position: Defender

Senior career*
Years	Team	Apps	(Gls)
2003–2006	CS Sfaxien		
2006–2008	Zamalek SC		
2008–2011	Espérance de Tunis	7	(0)

International career
2005–2008	Tunisia	6	(0)
- * Club domestic league appearances and goals

Wisam El Abdy (Arabic: وسام العابدي) is a Tunisian footballer. He currently plays for Espérance. Previously, he had moved to Espérance de Tunis from Zamalek in Egypt.

Abdi has played for the Tunisia national football team at the 2005 FIFA Confederations Cup and in qualifying matches for the 2006 FIFA World Cup.
