= Mohamed Abdel Monsef =

Egyptian footballer (born 1977)

Personal information
- Full name: Mohamed Abdel Monsef Ahmed
- Date of birth: 6 February 1977 (age 49)
- Height: 1.89 m (6 ft 2 in)
- Position: Goalkeeper

Senior career*
Years	Team	Apps	(Gls)
1995–1999	Dina Farms	49	(0)
1999–2010	Zamalek	140	(0)
2010–2012	El Gouna	44	(0)
2012–2012	Al Ittihad	0	(0)
2012–2017	ENPPI	79	(0)
2017–2021	Wadi Degla	124	(0)
2021–2022	Al Ittihad	16	(0)

International career
2002–2008	Egypt	12	(0)
Medal record
Men's football
Representing Egypt
Africa Cup of Nations
Winner	2006 Egypt
Winner	2008 Ghana
- * Club domestic league appearances and goals

Mohamed Abdel Monsef Ahmed (Arabic: مُحَمَّد عَبْد الْمُنْصِف أَحْمَد; born 6 February 1977) is an Egyptian professional footballer. Who is retired and last played for Ittihad Alexandria SC.

== Career ==
Abdel Monsef started his career with Dina Farms, then he played for Zamalek for eleven years. Later on, he joined El Gouna, Al Ittihad, ENPPI and Wadi Degla. On 24 September 2020, he played his 400th match in the Egyptian Premier League.

According to IFFHS, Abdel Monsef was the oldest player in the world to feature in a match in the top tier of a national championship in 2021, aged 44 years and 321 days in his last Egyptian Premier League game in 2021 against Al Masry on 24 December. The following year, however, he was the second-oldest to do so, at the age of 45 years and 198 days, only behind Bulgarian goalkeeper Georgi Petkov, who appeared in the Bulgarian First League at the age of 45 years and 343 days.

== Honours and achievements ==
=== Club ===
Zamalek

- Egyptian Premier League: 2000–01, 2002–03, 2003–04
- Egypt Cup: 2002, 2008
- Egyptian Super Cup: 2001, 2002
- CAF Champions League: 2002
- CAF Super Cup: 2003
- Arab Club Champions Cup: 2003
- Saudi-Egyptian Super Cup: 2003

=== International ===
Egypt

- Africa Cup of Nations: 2006, 2008
