= Mostafa Gaafar =

Egyptian footballer (born 1981)

Personal information
- Full name: Mostafa Gaafar
- Date of birth: 3 April 1981 (age 45)
- Place of birth: Egypt
- Position: Forward

Senior career*
Years	Team	Apps	(Gls)
2001–2004	Al-Masry	10	(4)
2004–2005	Baladeyet El-Mahalla	12	(7)
2005–2008	Zamalek SC	83	(24)
2008–2010	ENPPI	12	(1)
2010	Al-Masry		
2010	→ Tala'ea El-Gaish (loan)	10	(1)
2010–2011	Ismaily SC	2	(0)
2011	→ El Koroum (loan)		
2011	Smouha		
2011–2012	Tersana		
2012–2014	Al-Sekka Al-Hadid		
2014–2015	Al-Merrikh		
2015–2016	El Mokawloon		
2016	FC Masr		
2016–2017	Pharco FC		
2017–2018	Al Fanar		
2018–2019	El Sekka		

International career
2006	Egypt	1	(0)
- * Club domestic league appearances and goals

Mostafa Gaafar (Arabic: مصطفى جعفر; born 3 April 1981) is an Egyptian footballer.

== Career ==
He transferred from Baladeyet Al-Mahalla and has shown his brilliant dribbling ability and calm finishing, prompting Egyptian National team coach Hassan Shehata to call him up to the national team. Gaafar has claimed he had not been given enough playing time and threatened to leave Zamalek if he did not get a chance to show his ability.

== Honors ==
=== Zamalek ===
- Egypt Cup: 2008
