= Ricardinho (footballer, born November 1982) =

Brazilian footballer (born 1982)

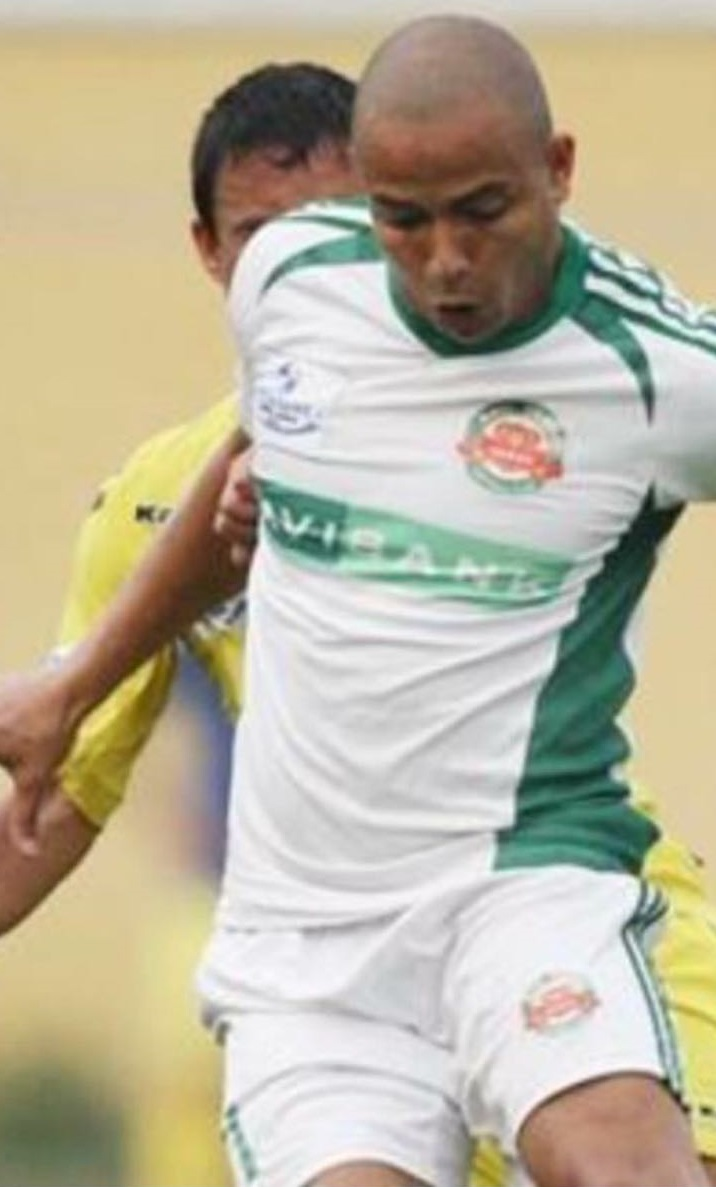

Personal information
- Full name: Ricardo Alves Fernandes
- Date of birth: 6 November 1982 (age 44)
- Place of birth: Governador Valadares, Brazil
- Height: 1.80 m (5 ft 11 in)
- Position: Defender

Youth career
- 1999: Democrata

Senior career*
Years	Team	Apps	(Gls)
2000–2001	Democrata		
2000	→ America Mineiro		
2001–2002	Ipatinga Esporte Clube		
2001	→ Corinthians Alagoano		
2002	→ 1. FC Kaiserslautern		
2002–2003	Nacional		
2004–2005	São Caetano		
2005–2007	Vasco da Gama	10	(0)
2005–2006	→ Rouen		
2006–2007	Al-Ittihad Tripoli		
2007–2008	Social Futebol Clube		
2008–2009	Zamalek	7	(1)
2009–2010	Pattaya United		
2010–2011	Chainat Hornbill		
2011–2012	Navibank Sài Gòn	13	(1)
- * Club domestic league appearances and goals

Ricardo Alves Fernandes (born 6 November 1982), also known as Ricardinho, is a Brazilian former professional footballer played as a defender in several teams in Brazil, the Middle East, Asia and Europe.

== Career ==
On 4 March 2005, Ricardinho made his debut for Vasco da Gama coming on for Diego Pereira Corrêa in the 11th minute in the team's 1–0 defeat against Volta Redonda in the Campeonato Carioca. He made his first assist for Vasco da Gama with a cross to Romario in the 2:2 tie against rivals Flamengo in the Maracanã on 20 March 2005.

On 20 July 2008, the Egyptian club Zamalek signed contract with Ricardo Alves Fernandes for three seasons in a $1,000,000 contract.

On 4 February 2012, Ricardinho scored in the 60th minute, on his debut for Navibank Sài Gòn in a 2–0 win against Hoang Anh Gia Lai FC in the V.League 1.

== Personal life ==
On 19 January 2009, Ricardinho terminated his employment contract with Zamalek, and subsequently lodged a claim in front of FIFA against the club seeking USD $1,223,566 as compensation for breach of contract. On 4 December 2017, Zamalek was fined by FIFA to pay Ricardinho for breach of contract and late outstanding dues.
