= Ahmed M. Ibrahim =

Egyptian footballer

Ahmed Ibrahim
Personal information
- Full name: Ahmed Mohamed Ibrahim
- Date of birth: N/A
- Place of birth: Cairo, Egypt
- Position: Defender

Youth career
- Al-Zamalek

Senior career*
Years	Team	Apps	(Gls)
2008	Al-Zamalek	1	(1)
- * Club domestic league appearances and goals

Ahmed Mohamed Ibrahim is an Egyptian football defender who scored a goal in his first and only match with Al-Zamalek.
