= Wael Zenga =

Egyptian footballer and coach (born 1981)

Personal information
- Full name: Wael Ismail
- Date of birth: 25 November 1981 (age 44)
- Place of birth: Egypt
- Height: 1.86 m (6 ft 1 in)
- Position: Goalkeeper

Youth career
- Zamalek

Senior career*
Years	Team	Apps	(Gls)
2000–2008	Zamalek		
2008–2009	Aluminium Nag Hammâdi		
2009–2011	Ghazl El-Mehalla		
2011–2019	El Dakhleya		

Managerial career
- 2019: Lansing Ignite (goalkeeping)
- 2021–: Tampa Bay United (goalkeeping)
- * Club domestic league appearances and goals

Wael Ismael "Zenga" (born 25 November 1981) is an Egyptian football coach. He has previously played as a goalkeeper for Egyptian Premier League clubs Zamalek, Aluminium Nag Hammadi, Ghazl El Mahalla, and El Dakhleya.

He has won three titles on a national scale. He won a bronze medal in the 2001 FIFA World Youth Championship. He achieved the African Youth Cup of Nations third place in 2001. He was a bronze medalist at the Francophone Games with the Egyptian Olympic Team.

== Honors ==
=== with Zamalek ===
- 3 back-to-back league titles from 2000 to 2004,
- 1 Egyptian Cup,
- 2 Egyptian Super Cups,
- 1 African Cup Winners Cup,
- 1 Arab Champions Cup,
- 1 African Champions League,
- 1 African Super Cup,
- 1 Saudi-Egyptian Super Cup.
