= Hany Said (footballer, born 1980) =

Egyptian footballer (born 1980)

Personal information
- Full name: Omar Hany Mohammed Said Zakaria Gad
- Date of birth: 22 April 1980 (age 46)
- Place of birth: Cairo, Egypt
- Height: 1.76 m (5 ft 9 in)
- Positions: Centre-back; libero; defensive midfielder

Youth career
- Al Ahly

Senior career*
Years	Team	Apps	(Gls)
1997–1998	Al Ahly	12	(2)
1998–2003	Bari	43	(1)
2000	→ Bellinzona (loan)	4	(0)
2003	Messina	11	(0)
2003	Fiorentina	8	(0)
2004	Pistoiese		
2004–2005	Mons	10	(0)
2005–2006	Al Masry		
2006–2008	Ismaily	79	(0)
2008–2011	Zamalek	61	(4)
2011–2013	Misr Lel-Makkasa	15	(0)
2013	Smouha	13	(0)
2013–2019	Misr Lel-Makkasa	134	(5)

International career
2000–2010	Egypt	74	(0)
- * Club domestic league appearances and goals

Omar Hany Mohamed Said Zakaria Gad (Arabic: عُمَر هَانِي مُحَمَّد سَعِيد زَكَرِيَّا جَاد; born 22 April 1980) is an Egyptian retired professional footballer who played as a centre-back.

== Club career ==
Born in Cairo, Egypt, Said started his youth career at Al Ahly in 1997. The following year, he moved to the Italian club AS Bari where he played for three seasons in Serie A.

In February 2003, after five years with Bari, Said moved to Serie B side Messina for the second half of the 2002–03 season. In summer 2003 he moved to Fiorentina where he could not find his place. During the 2004–05 season he played for and suffered relegation with Belgian first-tier club Mons.

In 2006, Said left Al Masry for Ismaily.

His performances during the Africa Cup of Nations 2008 in Ghana made Said a target for Egypt's biggest clubs, Zamalek SC and Al Ahly. On 5 July 2018, Zamalek announced the signing of Said on a reported three-year contract. Two days later, it was reported Said had refused to sign the contract despite having signed a pre-contract agreement. On 12 July, Said was fined by the Egyptian Football Association E£350,000 and obliging him to play Zamalek after he had stated he was not "willing to play for any team in Egypt other than Ahli".

In summer 2001, after his contract with Zamalek ended Said joined Misr Lel-Makkasa on a free transfer. In August, Zamalek attempted to re-sign him.

In April 2018, Said announced he would retire at the end of the season.

He retired in November 2019.

== International career ==
In March 2002 CAF and FIFA banned Hany for six months after testing positive for drugs in 2002 African Cup of Nations which was held in Mali.

He returned to Egypt national team in 2004 but he did not participate in the winning team of 2006, however Hassan Shehata the coach of Egypt has recalled him in the preliminary squad for 2008 Africa Cup of Nations which won the cup too.

== Honours ==
Egypt

- African Cup of Nations: 2008, 2010
