= Alaa Abdel Ghany =

Egyptian footballer (born 1979)

Alaa Abdel-Ghany
Personal information
- Full name: Alaa Abdel-Ghany
- Date of birth: 26 January 1979 (age 47)
- Place of birth: Egypt
- Position: Defensive midfielder

Senior career*
Years	Team	Apps	(Gls)
2000–2005	Arab Contractors	55	(3)
2005–2009	Zamalek SC	68	(5)

International career
2004	Egypt	1	(0)

Managerial career
- 2015–: Zamalek (Asst. coach)
- * Club domestic league appearances and goals

Alaa Abdel-Ghany (Arabic: علاء عبد الغني; born 26 January 1979) was an Egyptian football defensive midfielder. He's currently the general coach of Zamalek SC. When he was a player, He moved to Zamalek from the Arab Contractors along with Ahmed Hossam. Alaa made a marked improvement after transferring to Zamalek and was selected for the Egypt national football team.

== Retirement ==
Abdel-Ghany retired season during the 2008–2009, after having incurred several injuries over a short period of time.

He could have continued playing after a while, but Zamalek released him and he then refused to play with another team.

== Honors ==
=== Al-Mokawloon Al-Arab ===
- Egyptian Super Cup: 2004

=== Zamalek ===
- Egypt Cup: 2008
