= Moussa Guindo =

Ivorian-Mal ian footballer (born 1991)

Personal information
- Date of birth: 25 January 1991 (age 35)
- Place of birth: Adjamé, Ivory Coast
- Height: 1.71 m (5 ft 7 in)
- Position: Defender

Youth career
- 2004–2007: Académie de Sol Beni
- 2009–2010: Charlton Athletic

Senior career*
Years	Team	Apps	(Gls)
2008	ASEC Mimosas	8	(0)
2009	→ ASEC Mimosas (loan)	13	(0)
2011–2012	Stade Malien		
2012	CA Bizertin	1	(0)

International career
2006	Mali U17		
2009–2011	Mali U20		
- * Club domestic league appearances and goals

Moussa Guindo (born 25 January 1991) is a footballer who played as a defender for French club Stade Mayennais. Born in Ivory Coast, he represented Mali at youth level.

== Club career ==
Born in Adjamé, Ivory Coast, Guindo began his career by Académie de Sol Beni, Guindo was promoted 2008 and was one of ASEC Mimosas's youngest players but a regular in defence as he enjoyed a first choice berth under coach Patrick Liewig. In January 2009 he joined Charlton Athletic. and returned to ASEC Mimosas on loan in July 2009. He moved to the land of his forefathers, Mali, and signed with Stade Malien.

In 2012, he joined the Tunisian League club CA Bizertin.

He plays in the lower leagues of France since 2012.

== International career ==
Guindo represented the Under-20 national team from Mali at 2009 African Youth Championship in Rwanda, and was member of the U-17 at CAN 2006, lastly the 2011 FIFA U-20 World Cup.
