= Mahmoud Samir (footballer) =

Egyptian footballer (born 1985)

Personal information
- Full name: Mahmoud Samir
- Date of birth: 27 January 1985 (age 41)
- Place of birth: Cairo, Egypt
- Positions: Right midfielder; attacking midfielder

Team information
- Current team: Al-Mokawloon al-Arab

Youth career
- Tersana

Senior career*
Years	Team	Apps	(Gls)
2000–2007	Al-Mokawloon al-Arab	?	(?)
2008–09	Zamalek	-	(1)
2009–10	Al-Mokawloon al-Arab		

International career^{‡}
- Egypt
- * Club domestic league appearances and goals as of 17 June 2008 ‡ National team caps and goals as of 17 June 2008

Mahmoud Samir (Arabic: محمود سمير) is an Egyptian former footballer who played as a midfielder for several Egyptian Premier League clubs.
