= Osama Hassan =

Egyptian footballer (born 1979)

Ossama Hassan
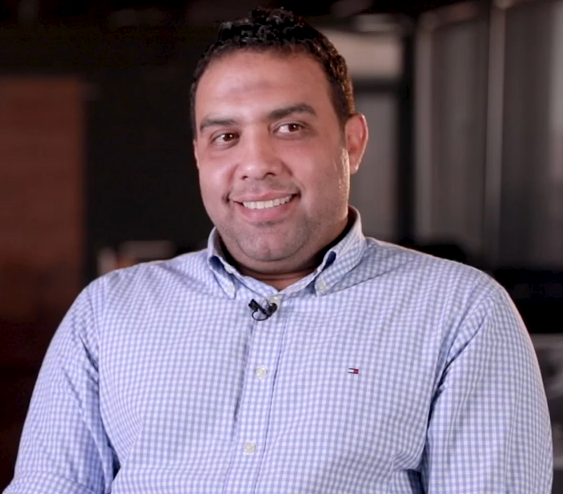

Personal information
- Date of birth: October 24, 1979 (age 47)
- Place of birth: Egypt
- Position: Left winger

Team information
- Current team: Ittihad

Senior career*
Years	Team	Apps	(Gls)
2003–2006	ENPPI	?	(8)
2006–2009	Zamalek SC	??	(8)
2009–present	Ittihad	0	(0)

International career
2004–2005	Egypt	3	(0)
- * Club domestic league appearances and goals

Osama Hassan (Arabic: أسامة حسن; born October 24, 1979) is an Egyptian footballer with Ittihad. He moved to Zamalek from ENPPI along with Magdy Atwa. Osama is known for his brilliant free-kicks and his powerful left-footed shots. He is also a graduate of the El Ahly youth academy, despite being a Zamalek supporter.

== Honors ==
=== with ENPPI ===
- Egyptian Cup (2005)

=== with Zamalek ===
- Egyptian Cup (2008)
