= Ahmed Ghanem Soltan =

Egyptian footballer (born 1986)

Ahmed Ghanem
Personal information
- Full name: Ahmed Ghanem Soltan
- Date of birth: 8 April 1986 (age 40)
- Place of birth: Giza, Egypt
- Height: 1.73 m (5 ft 8 in)
- Position: Right-back

Youth career
- Zamalek

Senior career*
Years	Team	Apps	(Gls)
2004–2005	Zamalek		
2005–2007	Legia Warsaw	2	(0)
2006–2007	→ Genclerbirliyi Sumqayit (loan)	8	(1)
2007–2013	Zamalek	73	(0)
2011–2012	→ Telephonat Bani Sweif (loan)	9	(0)
2013–2013	El Gouna	7	(1)
2013–2014	Ghazl El Mahalla		
2014–2016	Al Nasr		

International career
	Egypt U20	28	(0)
- * Club domestic league appearances and goals

Ahmed Ghanem Soltan (Arabic: أحمد غانم سلطان) (born 8 April 1986) is an Egyptian former professional footballer who played as a right-back. He is a graduate of the Zamalek SC youth academy; his father Ghanem Soltan was also a graduate of the Zamalek youth academy.

Ahmed had a brief stint in Poland, where he won the Ekstraklasa title with Legia Warsaw. He is well known for his pace and ability to both defend and attack on the right wing.

He is the son of former Zamalek and Egypt club player Ghanem Soltan.

== International career ==
Ghanem has represented Egypt at all youth levels, most notably at U20 level, including 2005 FIFA World Youth Championship.

== Honours ==
Legia Warsaw

- Ekstraklasa: 2005–06

Zamalek

- Egyptian Cup: 2007–08
