= Emad El Sayed =

Egyptian footballer (born 1986)

Personal information
- Date of birth: 30 April 1986 (age 40)
- Place of birth: Egypt
- Height: 1.90 m (6 ft 3 in)
- Position: Goalkeeper

Team information
- Current team: Tala'ea El-Gaish SC
- Number: 18

Youth career
- Zamalek

Senior career*
| Years | Team | Apps | (Gls) |
| 2010–2017 | Tala'ea El Gaish | 96 | (0) |
| 2017–2018 | ENPPI | 20 | (0) |
| 2018–2019 | Zamalek | 2 | (0) |
| 2019–2021 | Al Ittihad | 26 | (0) |
| 2021-22 | El Gouna FC | 20 | (0) |
| 2022-23 | El Dakhleya SC | 18 | (0) |
| 2023- | Tala'ea El-Gaish SC | 14 | (0) |
- * Club domestic league appearances and goals

Emad El-Sayed (Arabic: عماد السيد) is an Egyptian footballer who plays for Egyptian Premier League side Tala'ea El-Gaish SC as a goalkeeper.

== Honours ==
=== Zamalek SC ===
- Egypt Cup (1): 2008
- Saudi-Egyptian Super Cup: 2018
- CAF Confederation Cup : 2018–19
