= Amr Adel =

Egyptian footballer (born 1980)

Personal information
- Full name: Amr Adel Mohammed
- Date of birth: 31 August 1999 (age 27)
- Place of birth: Egypt
- Height: 1.87 m (6 ft 1 1/2 in)
- Position: Defender

Team information
- Current team: Ittihad Alexandria

Senior career*
Years	Team	Apps	(Gls)
2005–2009	El Geish	16	(1)
2008–2010	El Zamalek	15	(0)
2010–2012	Wadi Degla	37	(0)
2012–	Ittihad Alexandria		
- * Club domestic league appearances and goals

Amr Adel (Arabic: عمرو عادل; born 5 December 1980) is an Egyptian football defender. He currently plays for Egyptian club Al-Ittihad Al-Sakndary, having previously played for Zamalek, El Geish and Wadi Degla. Amr plays across the back three, four or five, but is usually centre-back. He is known for his no-nonsense style of defending.
