= Alaa Kamal =

Egyptian footballer

Personal information
- Full name: Alaa Kamal
- Date of birth: March 3, 1985 (age 41)
- Place of birth: Egypt
- Height: 1.80 m (5 ft 11 in)
- Position: Attacking midfielder

Senior career*
Years	Team	Apps	(Gls)
2002–2008	El Mokawloon	16	(6)
2008–2009	Zamalek	8	(1)
2009–2012	El Mokawloon	75	(11)
2012–2015	Al-Ittihad Alexandria	51	(8)
2015–2018	FC Masr	4	(1)
2018–2019	Tanta SC	1	(0)
2019	→ Abu Qir Fertilizers (loan)	0	(0)
- * Club domestic league appearances and goals

Alaa Kamal is a retired Egyptian professional football player. He started his career with Al-Mokawloon al-Arab. Before the start of the 2008/2009 season he signed with El Zamalek, he returned to Al-Mokawloon al-Arab after one season, and stay there for 3 seasons from 2009 to 2012, before he joined Al-Ittihad Al-Sakndary in 2013. He last played with Tanta SC before retiring.
