= Mohamed El-Morsy =

Egyptian footballer (born 1986)

Mohamed El Morsy
Personal information
- Full name: Mohamed El Morsy
- Date of birth: March 9, 1986 (age 40)
- Place of birth: Mansourah, Egypt
- Height: 1.88 m (6 ft 2 in)
- Position: Striker

Team information
- Current team: Ala'ab Damanhour

Youth career
- El Mansoura

Senior career*
Years	Team	Apps	(Gls)
2006–2008	El Mansoura	??	(??)
2008–2009	El Zamalek	10	(0)
2009–2010	→ Ittihad (on Loan)	1	(1)
2010–2014	Ittihad	4	(2)
2014	Haras El-Hodood SC	0	(0)
2014–	Ala'ab Damanhour	0	(0)
- * Club domestic league appearances and goals

Mohamed El Morsy (Arabic: محمد المرسي) (born March 9, 1986) is an Egyptian football striker who plays for Egyptian Premier League side Ittihad on loan from El Zamalek.

He scored on his debut for Ittihad in the opening match of the league against Petrojet.
