= Magdy Atwa =

Egyptian footballer (born 1983)

Personal information
- Date of birth: April 7, 1983 (age 43)
- Place of birth: Fayoum, Egypt
- Height: 1.68 m (5 ft 6 in)
- Position: Midfielder

Team information
- Current team: Sekka Al-Hadid

Youth career
- ENPPI

Senior career*
Years	Team	Apps	(Gls)
2003–2006	ENPPI	-	(3)
2006–2008	Zamalek	-	(4)
2008–2009	Tersana	18	(0)
2009–2010	Itesalat		
2010– 2014	Sekka Al-Hadid		
2014	Eastern Company		
- * Club domestic league appearances and goals

Magdy Atwa or Magdi Atwa (Arabic: مجدي عطوة; born 7 April 1983) is an Egyptian football midfielder. He currently plays for Al-Sekka Al-Hadid.

== Career ==
Atwa was born in Fayoum and is one of eight siblings. He claims his lifelong dream was to play for Zamalek, which became evident when he turned down offers from Al Ahly, Ismaily, and a number of European clubs to join Zamalek following his fine performances at ENPPI. Atwa scored four goals for Zamalek in 2006–07 Egyptian Premier League.

== Honors ==
=== with Zamalek ===
- Egyptian Cup (2008)
