= Sayed Mosaad =

Egyptian footballer (born 1987)

Personal information
- Date of birth: April 8, 1987 (age 39)
- Place of birth: Ismailia, Egypt
- Height: 1.86 m (6 ft 1 in)
- Position: Striker

Team information
- Current team: Al-Qanah
- Number: 19

Youth career
- Al-Qanah

Senior career*
Years	Team	Apps	(Gls)
2007–2008	Al-Qanah		
2008–2009	Al Ahli Saida		
2009	Al-Qanah		(19)
2009–2010	Zamalek		(6)
2010–2011	Gasco		(4)
2011–2012	Al-Qanah		(6)
2012–2013	Al-Yarmouk		
2013–	Al-Ahli		

International career
	Egypt U20	6	(1)
- * Club domestic league appearances and goals

Sayed Mosaad (Arabic: سيد مسعد) (born on 8 April 1987) is an Egyptian footballer who last played for Al-Qanah, but was most famous for his spell at Zamalek in the Egyptian Premier League.

His transfer to El Zamalek cost them €150,000.

He regularly represented the Egypt national under-20 football team.
