= Mahmoud Fathalla =

Egyptian footballer (born 1982)

Personal information
- Full name: Mahmoud Fathalla Abdou Ibrahim El Henawy
- Date of birth: 13 February 1982 (age 44)
- Place of birth: Dakahlia, Egypt
- Height: 1.86 m (6 ft 1 in)
- Position: Centre-back

Senior career*
Years	Team	Apps	(Gls)
2002–2007	Ghazl El Mehalla	60	(5)
2007–2014	Zamalek	142	(43)
2014–2015	Tala'ea El Gaish	25	(1)
2015–2017	El Entag El Harby	68	(15)
2017	Nejmeh	12	(2)
2017–2018	Al Mokawloon Al Arab	6	(1)
2018–2020	Nogoom	28	(3)
Total		280+	(49)

International career
2005–2013	Egypt	53	(2)

Managerial career
- 2025: Nejmeh
- * Club domestic league appearances and goals

Mahmoud Fathalla Abdou Ibrahim El Henawy (Arabic: عبدو ابراهيم الحناوي محمود فتح الله; born 13 February 1982) is an Egyptian manager and former professional footballer who played as a centre-back.

== International career ==
Fathalla represented the Egypt national team in two Africa Cup of Nations tournaments, in 2008 and 2010, winning both times.

== Managerial career ==
Fathalla signed with Nejmeh on 21 April 2025 as the head coach for the remainder of the season after former manager Mohammad Dakka resigned.

== Career statistics ==
=== International ===
Scores and results list Egypt's goal tally first, score column indicates score after each Fathalla goal.

List of international goals scored by Mahmoud Fathalla
No.	Date	Venue	Opponent	Score	Result	Competition	Ref.
1	3 September 2010	Cairo International Stadium, Cairo, Egypt	Sierra Leone	1–1	1–1	2012 Africa Cup of Nations qualification	
2	17 April 2014	Borg El Arab Stadium, Alexandria, Egypt	Mozambique	1–0	1–0	2014 FIFA World Cup qualification	

== Honours ==
Zamalek

- Egypt Cup: 2008, 2013, 2014

Egypt

- Africa Cup of Nations: 2008, 2010

Individual

- Lebanese Premier League Best Goal: 2017–18
