= Amr Zaki =

Egyptian footballer (born 1983)

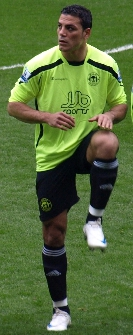
- Amr Zaki playing for Wigan Athletic in 2009

Personal information
- Full name: Amr Hassan Zaki
- Date of birth: 1 April 1983 (age 43)
- Place of birth: Mansoura, Egypt
- Height: 1.85 m (6 ft 1 in)
- Position: Striker

Youth career
- El Mansoura

Senior career*
Years	Team	Apps	(Gls)
2001–2003	El Mansoura	20	(20)
2003–2006	ENPPI	64	(27)
2006	Lokomotiv Moscow	0	(0)
2006–2012	Zamalek	88	(35)
2008–2009	→ Wigan Athletic (loan)	29	(10)
2010	→ Hull City (loan)	6	(0)
2012	Elazığspor	8	(0)
2013	ENPPI	0	(0)
2013–2014	Al-Salmiya	9	(2)
2014	Raja CA	2	(1)
2014–2015	Al Ahed	0	(0)
2015	El Mokawloon	0	(0)
Total		224	(94)

International career
2004–2013	Egypt	63	(30)
Medal record
Men's football
Representing Egypt
Africa Cup of Nations
Winner	2006 Egypt
Winner	2008 Ghana
- * Club domestic league appearances and goals

Amr Hassan Zaki (Arabic: عَمْرو حَسَن زَكِيّ; born 1 April 1983) is an Egyptian former professional footballer who played as a striker.

He has played for numerous different clubs in Egypt, Russia, England, Turkey and Kuwait. Zaki has made 63 appearances and scored 30 goals for the Egyptian national team. In his career, Zaki has been nicknamed "The Bulldozer" and has been likened to former England striker Alan Shearer.

However, his career has not been without controversy. He was labelled "highly unprofessional" by former Wigan manager Steve Bruce. Also, his decision not to join English club Portsmouth due to the nationality of some of the players garnered much criticism in the English press.

== Club career ==
=== Early career ===
Born in Mansoura, Zaki started his career at El Mansoura. He moved to ENPPI for the 2003–04 season. At ENPPI, he became the Egyptian Premier League top goalscorer for the 2004–05 season and helped the club win its first trophy, the 2005 Egypt Cup, as well as being runners-up in the Egyptian Premier League, After impressing in the 2006 African Cup of Nations, Zaki caught the attention of many clubs, such as El Zamalek and Al-Ahly from Egypt, Al-Ain from the UAE, and Nantes from France. But Zaki later decided to play for Russian club Lokomotiv Moscow, who signed him for a reported sum of €1.7 million. However, he did not play a single match for Lokomotiv.

In 2006, Zaki moved back to the Egyptian Premier League and signed to play for El Zamalek. Owing to his powerful physical displays as a forward, fans nicknamed him the "Bulldozer" and newspapers nicknamed him the "Egyptian Gladiator".

=== Wigan Athletic ===
On 22 July 2008, Wigan Athletic completed a one-year loan deal to bring Zaki to the JJB Stadium for a sum of £1.5 million. After scoring two goals in his two pre-season appearances for Wigan, Zaki scored on his league debut on 16 August against West Ham United. On 30 August, he scored his first brace for Wigan in a 5–0 victory over Premier League new-boys Hull City. On 13 September he scored his fourth goal in as many games in the Premier League as Wigan drew with Sunderland, putting him joint top of the goal scoring charts alongside Jermain Defoe. On 28 September, Zaki scored again in the Premier League from the penalty spot against Manchester City, and this goal took him to the top of the goal scorers list with five goals in six games. He followed it with two more goals against Liverpool, further solidifying his position as top scorer in the English Premier League. He also scored penalties in 2–1 victories over Portsmouth and Newcastle United. At one point, he was the third top scorer in the Premier League behind Chelsea's Nicolas Anelka and Manchester City's Robinho who had 15 and 12 respectively to Zaki's 10; however, he failed to add to that tally, in which Anelka finished top with 19.

Wigan Athletic chairman Dave Whelan likened Zaki to Alan Shearer, saying that "when you look at this lad and his build... He has the same confidence when he gets the ball, he knows where the goal is, he doesn't need to look up, he has this instinct. Strikers like that have an instinct as to where the goal is. You can't describe it, you can't give it to anybody. Former Wigan manager Steve Bruce had also been highly impressed with Zaki, and told the press he believed he was "awesome". Bruce said that "he put in a fantastic performance. If he keeps playing like that he is going to have a real future in the Premier League" and "his physique is great, he has awesome power and pace and of course he wants to score goals which is the important thing".

==== Controversy ====
In April 2009, Zaki failed to return to Wigan Athletic from one of Egypt's World Cup qualification matches, leading his former-club manager, Steve Bruce, to label him as the most unprofessional player he had ever worked with. His late returns from international duty led to Bruce publicly branding Zaki "highly unprofessional" and fining him the maximum amount permitted, which he has done on more than one occasion; "Before this latest incident, Zaki had already been fined considerably more than the average person in Britain earns in a year and he will now face another heavy fine". However, Bruce said that repeatedly fining him does not seem to alter his poor behaviour. Bruce subsequently confirmed on 17 May 2009 that the club will not be taking up the option of making his loan deal permanent.

=== Return to Zamalek ===
Zaki returned to Egyptian Premier League side El Zamalek for the 2009–10 season. During the summer transfer window, he turned down a move to English Premier League club Portsmouth, which had been strongly linked with the player. This has been largely criticized in the English press, because his refusal was due to the presence of two Algerians and an Israeli on the team. Zaki said that "after Portsmouth signed an Israeli player and also hired an Israeli football director a possible move was ruled out. On top of that, no way could I play at Portsmouth with an Algerian within in their ranks." During his time at El Zamalek he struggled with injuries, sickness, goal scoring ducks, and his spot on the team.

=== Hull City ===
On 17 January 2010, Zaki passed a medical with Hull City moving to the club on a five-month loan. On 30 January 2010, he made his debut for Hull coming on as substitute for Jozy Altidore in the 69-minute. Hull went on to draw the match 2–2 with Wolverhampton Wanderers. Amr Zaki quoted: "If an offer from a decent club does not come up by the end of my time at Hull, then I will return to Zamalek." On 17 April 2010, it was confirmed by his agent that his loan had been terminated and that he returned to Zamalek.

=== Return to Zamalek ===
Zaki returned to Zamalek at the beginning of the 2010–11 season and gave phenomenal performances, becoming the team's top scorer after scoring three goals in the league's first four matches. However, in October 2010, Zaki suffered a career threatening injury that kept him out for the better part of ten months. Zaki returned from injury and participated with Zamalek in the Egypt Cup, scoring twice in the semi-final match against defending champions Haras El-Hodood, thus leading his team to qualify for the final with a 2–1 victory.

In November 2011, Zaki had a financial dispute with Zamalek board over his unpaid wages, claiming that he hasn't been paid over a year. The dispute lasted three months, before Zamalek chairman, Mamdouh Abbas, paid Zaki a large percentage of his late wages. Zaki made his first appearance for Zamalek after the dispute, coming on as a second-half substitute in a Round of 64 CAF Champions League game against Tanzanian club Young Africans. Zaki scored the equalizer goal in the 74th minute, and the game finished 1–1.

After his return to Zamalek from his loan moves from Hull City and Wigan, Zaki received many offers to play abroad, including good offers from Russia, China and France, but Zamalek kept on refusing to let him go, as he was considered one of the team's main pillars and star players.

On 5 June 2012, Zaki told Egyptian sports website FilGoal that he relished a return to play in England again. This came in parallel with Egypt U-23 coach Hany Ramzy statement that Zaki may be called up to play for Egypt in the 2012 London Olympics U-23 tournament as one of the three allowed overage players. Zaki commented on that by saying: “I think it's a good chance for me to re-appear on English grounds. It is an opportunity to be watched again." Eventually, Zaki was not picked for the Olympics by Ramzy. However, since Zamalek continued to face financial problems throughout 2011 and 2012, Zaki started to be considered on his way out of the club as a way to bring in cash. Gaziantepspor and other Turkish sides, along with some English teams and other Persian Gulf sides, had all shown their interest in Zaki. On 20 July 2012, English Championship side Blackpool sent an official request to the player to go on a one-week trial at the club. Zaki and Zamalek had accepted the trial offer, but Blackpool later pulled out of the transfer negotiations and cancelled their trial offer. Fellow Championship club Middlesbrough had also shown an interest as well. Zaki stated his desire to join Middlesbrough after speaking with his former teammate Mido about the club and insisted on a two-year contract, but manager Tony Mowbray only offered Zaki a deal until the end of the season. Zaki turned down the offer. Zaki's agent later said: "Everything was agreed, his medical, his contract, his house, but Middlesbrough changed their minds at the last minute. Amr wanted to join Middlesbrough and help them win promotion, it was not about money. Amr was ready to travel". A Middlesbrough spokesman stated that Zaki was one of a number of players being chased by the club, and no offer was submitted to the player.

=== Elazığspor ===
In late July 2012, Turkish side Gaziantepspor offered Zamalek club €250,000 for Zaki, and Zamalek accepted the offer on 31 July 2012. However, speculation appeared on the bid after Gaziantepspor failed to send the official contract on the agreed deadline. Because of that, Zaki's move to Gaziantepspor was thrown into doubt, and fellow Turkish side Elazığspor began to show interest in signing the player. On 6 August, Elazığspor club official Selçuk Cengiz Öztürk stated that Elazığspor have reached an agreement with Zamalek to sign Zaki according to Elazığspor manager Bülent Uygun and it was expected that he would join on a three-year deal. He later stated that he would arrive in Egypt on Monday 7 August to complete the move. On the next day, Gaziantepspor officially dropped out of the negotiations with Zamalek due to unstated reasons. Later on, Elazığspor officially signed Zaki on a two-year deal, for the same price which Gaziantepspor had previously offered (€250,000) During the contract agreement phase, Zaki requested to put a special clause in his contract, which stated that if Elazığspor get relegated to the Turkish second division, Zaki would be free to leave the club if he wanted.

After missing the first two games of the season due to registration and contractual problems, Zaki made his debut for Elazığspor in a 0–3 loss against Kasimpasa, coming in as a substitute in halftime. After losing 0–3 to Beşiktaş in his second game, Zaki put in a wonderful performance in his third appearance against Bursaspor, scoring an assist and scoring a disallowed goal due to Zaki being in an offside position. After that, a couple of injuries kept Zaki on the sidelines a few times, and he was able to make only eight appearances out of potential 17.

Near the end of December 2012, Zaki asked Elazığspor to allow him to leave the club, as he had received a number of offers from England, France, Ukraine and the Persian Gulf region. Elazığspor board conceded to give up on the player for a fee of €400,000. However, no club met the €400,000 price tag that the Turkish Club had put on Zaki, and Zaki later agreed with the club board to rescind his contract due to his not receiving his wages since two months. In late January, Zaki had officially rescinded his contract with the club he became a free agent. He finished his short stint with the Turkish club without scoring any goals and with only one assist.

=== Return to ENPPI ===
After being close to signing with Ukrainian giants Shakhtar Donetsk in the 2013 winter transfer window, Zaki made a surprise move to former club ENPPI that surprised Egyptian and football fans around the world. Zaki signed a two-and-half-year contract, keeping him at the Egyptian club until June 2015. It was mostly expected that Zaki would return to his home club Zamalek once again, but Zaki had explained that the Zamalek chairman Mamdouh Abbas had "rejected his return to Zamalek." Twelve days after his signing with the club, Zaki and the club had terminated the player's contract after a "disagreement" between the two sides. And Zaki was once again a free agent.

=== Al-Salmiya ===
On 18 June 2013, Zaki officially signed for Kuwaiti club Al-Salmiya for one year and was presented to the press a few days after. He received the number 9 jersey. On his debut, Zaki scored in the league opener against Yarmouk scoring the final goal in Al-Salmiya's 4–0 win. In the third game of the season against Kazma, he scored his second goal in three games scoring Al-Salmiya's first goal in a 3–1 win over the Kuwaiti giants. After suffering a couple injuries and some minor issues with his salary, in December 2013 Zaki and Al Salmiya agreed to terminate the player's contract to prevent any more financial issues and also because Zaki wasn't performing as well as he had hoped in the Kuwaiti Premier League and wanted to move to Europe or a different Arab League. Zaki ended his stint with Al Salmiya with two goals and an assist from nine matches.

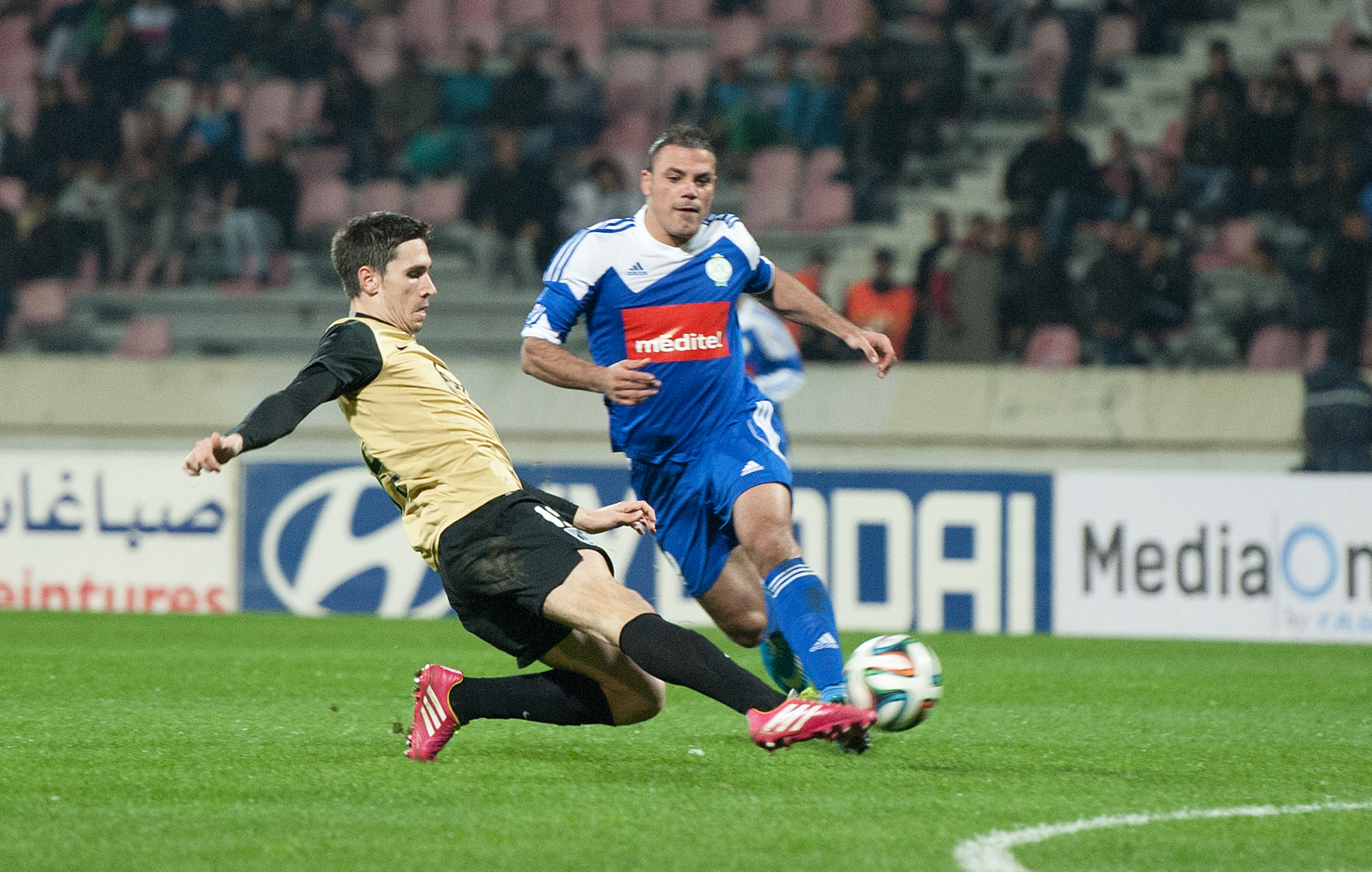
Amr Zaki in a friendly match with Raja CA against Vitória Guimarães in 2014

=== Raja CA ===
On 30 December 2013, it was reported that Zaki was going to join Moroccan champions Raja CA on 1 January 2014 when the winter transfer window re-opened. In a friendly match, Zaki broke his foot and ankle ligaments and required surgery which would leave Zaki out action for up to 3–4 months, which resulted in him missing the rest of the 2013–14 season. However, controversy broke out when the club claimed they had no knowledge that Zaki went to do a surgery on his foot, and they later expressed their anger with Zaki for not letting the club officials know that he was going to perform a surgery. Raja and Zaki later agreed to the termination of the contract to avoid any further issues. Zaki featured in three friendlies during the club's winter break, scoring one goal. He never made an official competitive appearance for Raja CA. And for the fourth time in two years, Zaki was once again a free agent.

=== Al Ahed ===
On 16 August 2014, Zaki signed a one-year deal with Lebanese Premier League club Al Ahed. The transfer was the most expensive in the history of the league to date. On 12 September 2014, he terminated his contract with the club due to injury concerns. He didn't play a single game with the club.

=== El Mokawloon ===
In January 2015, he signed with El Mokawloon on an 18-month-contract, uniting with his former coach in national team Hassan Shehata. He made his return to football after almost 400 days away from the game in round 32 in Egypt Cup.

=== Retirement ===
On 18 August 2015, Zaki announced retirement from football via his Twitter account.

== International career ==
Zaki played for the Egyptian National Team. In the 2006 African Cup of Nations Zaki scored the winning goal for Egypt in the semi-final against Senegal late in the second half, with his first touch moments after coming off the bench to replace a visibly irate Mido – whose argument with coach Hassan Shehata held up play and resulted in a six-month international ban from the Egyptian Football Association for the player. Egypt later went on to win their fifth continental title.

Two years later in the 2008 Africa Cup of Nations, Zaki scored a goal against Zambia in the group stage and another in the quarter final against Angola. Additionally, he scored another header and then added another goal in the semi-final match against Ivory Coast. Egypt again went on to win the title for a record sixth time. He was chosen in the CAN 2008 All Star Starting XI.

After Egypt's failure to qualify to the 2010 FIFA World Cup, Zaki was fairly absent from the national squad for almost two years due to his many injuries with Hull City and Zamalek for the 2009–10 and 2010–11 seasons. After American Bob Bradley took over as coach of the national team, Zaki had been called up to the squad three times (November 2011, March 2012, and April 2012) and Zaki dropped out of the squad due to injury each time. Bradley was "done with Zaki" after citing an ear infection being the reason for Zaki to drop out for the third time. Media reported that Zaki was trying to avoid the national team and playing under Bradley, but he denied these rumors claiming that he ready to be called up at any time from now on. And finally after a lengthy absence from the national team, he was recalled by Bradley in October 2012 to play two friendlies against DR Congo and Tunisia. After nearly a four-year goal drought, Zaki scored in the 2014 FIFA World Cup qualifier against Guinea on 10 September 2013, scoring the fourth goal in the 4–2 win.

== Personal life ==
Zaki is a practicing Muslim and has stated: “When I was in England I was eager to fast all the time and keep praying and also reading Quran in my spare time. I fasted on every day and I don’t think it affected my performance – actually I think I got stronger. I have played many matches on days which I have fasted.” Despite Zaki's insistence that fasting has never affected him, it was to prove a sticking point at Wigan. “The manager Steve Bruce said to me that he understands my fast but he can’t let me play while I'm fasting. He told me that I have to choose. I chose fasting but then I played several matches without telling him that I'm fasting and I also kept playing well without problems.”

On 6 February 2026, Zaki was arrested at Cairo International Airport while attempting to travel abroad to the United Arab Emirates, after airport authorities found that he was subject to a travel ban stemming from outstanding judicial rulings, including a one-year prison sentence related to an unintentional injury case that occurred in El Alamein. He was released the following day after legal and administrative procedures were completed.

== Career statistics ==
=== Club ===
Appearances and goals by club, season and competition
Club	Season	League			National cup (Note: Includes Egypt Cup)		League cup (Note: Includes Football League Cup)		Continental		Total	
Club	Season	Division	Apps	Goals	Apps	Goals	Apps	Goals	Apps	Goals	Apps	Goals
Zamalek	2006–07	Egyptian Premier League	28	10	3	3	–		1 (Note: Appearances in CAF Champions League)	1	32	14
Zamalek	2007–08	Egyptian Premier League	16	7	3	3	–		3	1	22	11
Zamalek	2010–11	Egyptian Premier League	11	3	4	3	–		0	0	15	6
Zamalek	2011–12	Egyptian Premier League	5	3	0	0	–		5	1	10	4
Zamalek	Total		60	23	10	9	0	0	9	3	79	35
Wigan Athletic (loan)	2008–09	Premier League	29	10	0	0	3	1	–		32	11
Hull City (loan)	2009–10	Premier League	6	0	0	0	0	0	–		6	0
Elazığspor	2012–13	Süper Lig	8	0	0	0	–		–		8	0
Career total			103	33	10	9	3	1	9	3	125	46

=== International ===
Scores and results list Egypt's goal tally first, score column indicates score after each Zaki goal.

List of international goals scored by Amr Zaki
No.	Date	Venue	Opponent	Score	Result	Competition
1	8 October 2004	June 11 Stadium, Tripoli, Libya	Libya	1–1	1–2	2006 FIFA World Cup qualification
2	8 January 2005	Cairo Military Academy Stadium, Cairo, Egypt	Uganda	1–0	3–0	Friendly
3	5 June 2005	Arab Contractors Stadium, Cairo, Egypt	Sudan	2–0	6–1	2006 FIFA World Cup qualification
4	29 July 2005	Stade de Genève, Geneva, Switzerland	Qatar	3–0	5–0	Friendly
5	4 September 2005	Arab Contractors Stadium, Cairo, Egypt	Benin	1–0	4–1	2006 FIFA World Cup qualification
6	27 December 2005	Cairo International Stadium, Cairo, Egypt	Uganda	1–0	2–0	2005 LG Cup
7	14 January 2006	Cairo International Stadium, Cairo, Egypt	South Africa	1–1	1–2	Friendly
8	7 February 2006	Cairo International Stadium, Cairo, Egypt	Senegal	2–1	2–1	2006 Africa Cup of Nations
9	7 February 2007	Cairo International Stadium, Cairo	Sweden	1–0	2–0	Friendly
10	5 January 2008	Aswan Stadium, Aswan, Egypt	Namibia	1–0	3–0	Friendly
11	30 January 2008	Baba Yara Stadium, Kumasi, Ghana	Zambia	1–0	1–1	2008 Africa Cup of Nations
12	4 February 2008	Baba Yara Stadium, Kumasi, Ghana	Angola	2–1	2–1	2008 Africa Cup of Nations
13	7 February 2008	Baba Yara Stadium, Kumasi, Ghana	Ivory Coast	2–0	4–1	2008 Africa Cup of Nations
14	1 June 2008	Cairo International Stadium, Cairo, Egypt	DR Congo	1–1	2–1	2010 FIFA World Cup qualification
15	6 June 2008	El Hadj Hassan Gouled, Djibouti city, Djibouti	Djibouti	1–0	4–0	2010 FIFA World Cup qualification
16	29 March 2009	Cairo International Stadium, Cairo, Egypt	Zambia	1–0	1–1	2010 FIFA World Cup qualification
17	2 October 2009	Petro Sport Stadium, Cairo, Egypt	Mauritius	4–0	4–0	Friendly
18	5 November 2009	Aswan Stadium, Aswan, Egypt	Tanzania	2–0	5–1	Friendly
19	14 November 2009	Cairo International Stadium, Cairo, Egypt	Algeria	1–0	2–0	2010 FIFA World Cup qualification
20	10 September 2013	El Gouna Stadium, El Gouna, Egypt	Guinea	4–2	4–2	2014 FIFA World Cup qualification
21	14 November 2013	30 June Stadium, Cairo, Egypt	Zambia	1–0	2–0	Friendly
22	19 November 2013	30 June Stadium, Cairo, Egypt	Ghana	1–0	2–1	2014 FIFA World Cup qualification

== Honours ==
ENPPI

- Egypt Cup: 2004–05

Zamalek

- Egypt Cup: 2007–08

Egypt

- Africa Cup of Nations: 2006, 2008

Individual

- 2008 CAF African Footballer of the Year Nomination
- Africa Cup of Nations Team of the Tournament: 2008
