= Amr El-Safty =

Egyptian footballer (born 1982)

Personal information
- Full name: Amr Mohamed El-Safty Bekheet
- Date of birth: February 17, 1982 (age 44)
- Place of birth: Port Said, Egypt
- Height: 1.80 m (5 ft 11 in)
- Position: Defender

Youth career
- El-Masry

Senior career*
Years	Team	Apps	(Gls)
2000–2006	El-Masry	??	(?)
2006–2011	Zamalek	49	(1)
2011–2013	El Gouna	9	(0)
2013–2014	Ghazl El-Mahalla		
- * Club domestic league appearances and goals

Amr El-Safty (Arabic: عمرو الصفتي; born 17 February 1982 at Portsaid) is an Egyptian retired footballer.

== Career ==
El-Safty joined Zamalek from El-Masry in July 2006.

In August 2011, El-Safty joined El Gouna from Zamalek, in 2013 he joined Ghazl El-Mahalla for one season.

A defender by trade, El-Safty is noted for his aerial presence during set pieces, having scored several goals for both El-Masry and Zamalek.

== Honors ==
=== With Zamalek ===
- Egyptian Cup (2008)
