= 2003–04 Egyptian Premier League =

Egyptian Premier League
- Season: 2003–04
- Champions: Zamalek
- Relegated: Aswan; Olympic El Qanal FC; Koroum
- CAF Champions League: Zamalek (1st), Al Ahly (2nd)
- CAF Confederation Cup: Al-Mokawloon Al-Arab (Cup Winner), Ismaily (3rd)
- Top goalscorer: Abdel Halim Ali (21)

In the Egyptian League 2003/2004, fourteen teams has participated. The first placed team in the league is the league's champion and qualifies, along with the second placed, team to CAF Champions League 2005. The third placed team qualifies to CAF Champions League 2005. The teams with the last three places in the league will be relegated to the Egyptian Second Division.

Each team plays 26 matches from August 2003 to July 2004.

== Teams ==
- Al Ahly
- Tersana
- Zamalek
- Ghazl Al-Mehalla
- ENPPI
- Ismaili
- El-Ittihad El-Iskandary
- El-Masry
- El Mansoura
- Baladeyet El-Mahalla
- Aswan
- Olympic El Qanal
- Koroum
- Haras El Hodood

== League table ==
Pos	Team	Pld	W	D	L	GF	GA	GD	Pts	Qualification or relegation
1	Zamalek (C)	26	21	5	0	59	16	+43	68	Qualification for the Champions League
2	Al Ahly	26	19	2	5	56	20	+36	59	Qualification for the Champions League
3	Ismaily	26	15	6	5	37	25	+12	51	Qualification for the Confederation Cup
4	Ghazl Al-Mehalla	26	12	7	7	28	28	0	43	
5	El-Ittihad El-Iskandary	26	12	6	8	36	34	+2	42	
6	ENPPI	26	10	10	6	28	22	+6	40	
7	Haras El Hodoud	26	8	10	8	33	26	+7	34	
8	El Masry	26	8	8	10	31	31	0	32	
9	El Mansoura	26	8	7	11	22	32	−10	31	
10	El-Mahalla	26	8	6	12	24	33	−9	30	
11	Tersana	26	6	8	12	31	39	−8	26	
12	Aswan (R)	26	6	4	16	25	47	−22	22	Relegation to the Second Division
13	El Qanah (R)	26	3	3	20	16	42	−26	12	Relegation to the Second Division
14	Koroum (R)	26	2	6	18	20	51	−31	12	Relegation to the Second Division

Source: RSSSF
Rules for classification: 1) Points; 2) Head-to-Head points; 3) Head-to-Head goal difference; 4) Head-to-Head goal scored; 5) Head-to-Head away goal scored; 6) Goal difference; 7) Goal scored.
(C) Champions; (R) Relegated
