= Gamal Hamza =

Egyptian footballer (born 1981)

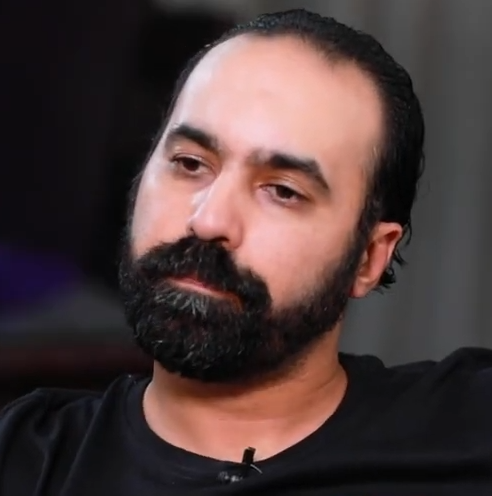

Personal information
- Full name: Gamal Mohamed Said Hamza
- Date of birth: 5 December 1981 (age 44)
- Place of birth: Cairo, Egypt
- Height: 1.74 m (5 ft 9 in)
- Position: Forward

Youth career
- Zamalek

Senior career*
Years	Team	Apps	(Gls)
1999–2009	Zamalek	147	(46)
2009	1. FSV Mainz 05	1	(0)
2010–2012	El Gouna	19	(5)
2011	→ Misr Lel-Makkasa (loan)	4	(0)
2013	Al Sinaa		
2013	FC Baia Zugdidi	2	(0)
2014	Haras El-Hodood	6	(0)

International career
2001–2007	Egypt	18	(4)
- * Club domestic league appearances and goals

Gamal Mohamed Said Hamza (Arabic: جَمَال مُحَمَّد سَعِيد حَمْزَة [ɡæˈmɑːl ˈħæmzæ], born 5 December 1981) is an Egyptian former footballer. He played for Zamalek SC for most of his football career. He last played for the Egyptian Premier League side Haras El-Hodood.

== Career ==
=== Zamalek ===
Hamza is a Zamalek youth academy graduate, and is considered one of the best Egyptian forwards. He is one of the highest scoring players in Cairo Derby against Al Ahly with eight goals. He is known for once having sported a reverse-Mohawk haircut, which he has since abandoned.

On 14 May 2009, Hamza signed a pre-contract with the Switzerland club FC Luzern. However, no agreement between Luzern and Hamza's club Al Zamalek came about.

=== Mainz ===
On 24 June 2009, Hamza signed with the German side 1. FSV Mainz 05 on a 2+1 basis, and was on 11 October 2009 released from his contract.

=== El Gouna FC ===
Having destroyed any hope of a possible comeback to former club Zamalek by choosing their bitter rivals Ahly over them, Hamza returned to former club El Gouna and made a good impression by scoring three goals in the league's first four matches. After a dispute with the technical staff, Hamza was completely excluded from all of the club's matches for the remainder of the first half of the season and a decision was reached to sell him in the winter transfer window.

== International career ==
Hamza played in the World Youth Cup U20 Argentina in 2001 and holds 18 games, scoring four goals for the A-team. He played for the Egyptian football team

== Career statistics ==
=== International ===
Appearances and goals by national team and year
National team	Year	Apps	Goals
Egypt	2001	2	0
Egypt	2002	3	0
Egypt	2003	4	4
Egypt	2004	2	0
Egypt	2006	3	0
Egypt	2007	2	0
Total		16	4

Scores and results list Egypt's goal tally first, score column indicates score after each Hamza goal.

List of international goals scored by Gamal Hamza
No.	Date	Venue	Opponent	Score	Result	Competition	Ref.
1	19 March 2003	Port Said Stadium, Port Said, Egypt	Qatar	1–0	6–0	Friendly	
2	19 March 2003	Port Said Stadium, Port Said, Egypt	Qatar	2–0	6–0	Friendly	
3	19 March 2003	Port Said Stadium, Port Said, Egypt	Qatar	3–0	6–0	Friendly	
4	8 June 2003	Port Said Stadium, Port Said, Egypt	Mauritius	4–0	7–0	2004 African Cup of Nations qualification	

== Honours ==
=== Club ===
Zamalek

- Egyptian Premier League (3): 2000–01, 2002–03, 2003–04
- Egypt Cup (2): 2000–01, 2007–08
- Egyptian Super Cup (2): 2000–01, 2001–02
- African Cup Winners' Cup: 2000
- CAF Champions League: 2002
- CAF Super Cup: 2003
- Saudi-Egyptian Super Cup: 2003
- Arab Club Champions Cup: 2003

=== International ===
Egypt

- FIFA U-20 World Cup: 2001
