= Ahmed Abdel Raouf =

Egyptian footballer (born 1986)

Personal information
- Full name: Ahmed Gameel Abdel Raouf
- Date of birth: 12 April 1986 (age 40)
- Place of birth: Egypt
- Height: 1.82 m (6 ft 0 in)
- Position: Midfielder

Senior career*
Years	Team	Apps	(Gls)
2007–2010	Zamalek	57	(1)
2010–2012	Misr Lel Makasa	37	(1)
2012–2013	Telephonat Bani Sweif		
2013–2014	Misr Lel Makasa		
2014–2016	Wadi Degla		
2016–2017	El Dakhleya		
2017–2018	El Mansoura		

International career
- Egypt

Managerial career
- 2020: Zamalek (assistant)
- 2022: El Masry Salloum
- 2022–2024: Baladiyat El Mahalla
- 2024: El Sekka El Hadid
- 2025: Baladiyat El Mahalla
- 2025–2026: Zamalek
- * Club domestic league appearances and goals

Ahmed Abdel Raouf (Arabic: أحمد عبد الرؤوف; born 12 April 1986) is a former Egyptian professional footballer who recently managed the Egyptian Premier League side Zamalek SC.

== Career ==
Abdel Raouf played as a central midfielder. He was a graduate of the Zamalek youth academy.

In July 2010, Abdel Raouf transferred to the newly promoted side Misr Lel Makasa (MCSD), signing a two-year contract.

== Honors ==
Zamalek

- Egyptian Cup (2008)
