= 2010 Africa Cup of Nations Group C =

Football tournament group stage

Group C was one of four groups of national teams competing at the 2010 Africa Cup of Nations. The group's first round of matches began on 12 January and its last matches were played on 20 January. Most matches were played at the Complexo da Sr. da Graça in Benguela and featured the defending champions Egypt, joined by Nigeria, Benin, and Mozambique.

== Standings ==
Pos	Team	Pld	W	D	L	GF	GA	GD	Pts	Qualification
1	Egypt	3	3	0	0	7	1	+6	9	Advance to knockout stage
2	Nigeria	3	2	0	1	5	3	+2	6	Advance to knockout stage
3	Benin	3	0	1	2	2	5	−3	1	
4	Mozambique	3	0	1	2	2	7	−5	1	

Source: CAF

== Egypt vs Nigeria ==
12 January 2010
17:00

Egypt	3–1	Nigeria
Moteab 34'; Hassan 54'; Gedo 87'	Report	Obasi 12'

Complexo da Sr. da Graça, Benguela
Attendance: 18,000
Referee: Rajindraparsad Seechurn (Mauritius)

GK	1	Essam El-Hadary
DF	6	Hany Said
DF	20	Wael Gomaa
DF	14	Sayed Moawad
DF	2	Mahmoud Fathallah
MF	12	Hossam Ghaly	(substituted off) 56'
MF	7	Ahmed Fathy
MF	17	Ahmed Hassan
MF	8	Hosny Abd Rabo	(substituted off) 72'
FW	9	Mohamed Zidan	(substituted off) 84'
FW	10	Emad Moteab
Substitutions:
DF	3	Ahmed Elmohamady	(substituted on) 56'
FW	15	Gedo	(substituted on) 72'
MF	19	Mohamed Abdel-Shafy	(substituted on) 84'
Manager:
Hassan Shehata

GK	1	Vincent Enyeama
DF	2	Joseph Yobo
DF	3	Taye Taiwo
DF	5	Obinna Nwaneri	(yellow card) 61'
DF	19	Yusuf Mohamed
MF	20	Dickson Etuhu
MF	10	John Obi Mikel		(substituted off) 79'
MF	13	Ayila Yussuf
FW	16	Kalu Uche		(substituted off) 69'
FW	8	Yakubu
FW	7	Chinedu Obasi
Substitutions:
FW	18	Victor Obinna		(substituted on) 69'
FW	4	Nwankwo Kanu		(substituted on) 79'
Manager:
Shaibu Amodu

== Mozambique vs Benin ==
12 January 2010
19:30

Mozambique	2–2	Benin
Miro 29'; Fumo 54'	Report	Omotoyossi 14' (pen.); Khan 20' (o.g.)

Complexo da Sr. da Graça, Benguela
Attendance: 15,000
Referee: Khalid Abdel Rahman (Sudan)

GK	12	Kapango	(yellow card) 14'
DF	5	Paíto
DF	16	Miró
DF	23	Mexer	(yellow card) 59'
DF	18	Dario Khan
DF	21	Campira
MF	4	Simão
MF	7	Domingues
MF	8	Fumo		(substituted off) 77'
MF	3	Genito		(substituted off) 82'
FW	9	Tico-Tico	(yellow card) 53'	(substituted off) 90'
Substitutions:
FW	11	Hélder		(substituted on) 77'
DF	2	Momed Hagi		(substituted on) 82'
MF	14	Danito		(substituted on) 90'
Manager:
(Netherlands) Mart Nooij

GK	1	Yoann Djidonou
DF	12	Félicien Singbo		(substituted off) 64'
DF	5	Damien Chrysostome
DF	3	Khaled Adénon	(yellow card) 62'
DF	7	Romuald Boco
MF	18	Séïdath Tchomogo
MF	19	Jocelyn Ahouéya	(yellow card) 41'	(substituted off) 57'
MF	17	Stéphane Sessègnon
FW	11	Mouritala Ogunbiyi		(substituted off) 84'
FW	14	Mickaël Poté
FW	8	Razak Omotoyossi
Substitutions:
MF	4	Djiman Koukou		(substituted on) 57'
DF	23	Emmanuel Imorou		(substituted on) 64'
FW	10	Nouhoum Kobéna		(substituted on) 84'
Manager:
(France) Michel Dussuyer

== Nigeria vs Benin ==
16 January 2010
17:00

Nigeria	1–0	Benin
Yakubu 42' (pen.)	Report

Complexo da Sr. da Graça, Benguela
Attendance: 8,000
Referee: Hélder Martins de Carvalho (Angola)

GK	1	Vincent Enyeama
DF	2	Joseph Yobo		(substituted off) 55'
DF	6	Danny Shittu
DF	21	Uwa Elderson Echiéjilé	(yellow card) 86'
DF	19	Yusuf Mohamed
MF	20	Dickson Etuhu
MF	10	John Obi Mikel
FW	16	Kalu Uche		(substituted off) 74'
FW	8	Yakubu		(substituted off) 59'
FW	11	Peter Odemwingie
FW	7	Chinedu Obasi
Substitutions:
DF	22	Onyekachi Apam		(substituted on) 55'
FW	18	Victor Obinna		(substituted on) 59'
MF	15	Sani Kaita		(substituted on) 74'
Manager:
Shaibu Amodu

GK	16	Rachad Chitou		(substituted off) 73'
DF	23	Emmanuel Imorou		(substituted off) 66'
DF	5	Damien Chrysostome
DF	3	Khaled Adénon
DF	7	Romuald Boco	(yellow card) 42'
MF	18	Séïdath Tchomogo
MF	17	Stéphane Sessègnon	(yellow card) 25'
MF	4	Djiman Koukou
FW	10	Nouhoum Kobéna		(substituted off) 83'
FW	11	Mouritala Ogunbiyi
FW	8	Razak Omotoyossi	(yellow card) 90+1'
Substitutions:
DF	12	Félicien Singbo		(substituted on) 66'
GK	1	Yoann Djidonou		(substituted on) 73'
MF	20	Arnaud Séka		(substituted on) 84'
Manager:
(France) Michel Dussuyer

== Egypt vs Mozambique ==
16 January 2010
19:30

Egypt	2–0	Mozambique
Khan 47' (o.g.); Gedo 81'	Report

Complexo da Sr. da Graça, Benguela
Attendance: 16,000
Referee: Kokou Djaoupe (Togo)

GK	1	Essam El-Hadary
DF	6	Hany Said	(substituted off) 48'
DF	20	Wael Gomaa
DF	14	Sayed Moawad
DF	2	Mahmoud Fathallah
MF	7	Ahmed Fathy
MF	17	Ahmed Hassan
MF	8	Hosny Abd Rabo
MF	18	Shikabala	(substituted off) 68'
FW	9	Mohamed Zidan	(substituted off) 57'
FW	10	Emad Moteab
Substitutions:
DF	3	Ahmed Elmohamady	(substituted on) 48'
MF	11	Ahmed Eid Abdel Malek	(substituted on) 57'
FW	15	Gedo	(substituted on) 68'
Manager:
Hassan Shehata

GK	12	Kapango
DF	5	Paíto
DF	16	Miró	(yellow card) 86'
DF	23	Mexer
DF	18	Dario Khan	(yellow card) 31'
DF	21	Campira
MF	4	Simão
MF	7	Domingues
MF	8	Fumo		(substituted off) 52'
MF	3	Genito		(substituted off) 87'
FW	9	Tico-Tico		(substituted off) 68'
Substitutions:
MF	20	Josemar		(substituted on) 52'
DF	2	Momed Hagi	(yellow card) 90'	(substituted on) 68'
MF	14	Danito		(substituted on) 87'
Manager:
(Netherlands) Mart Nooij

== Egypt vs Benin ==
20 January 2010
17:00

Egypt	2–0	Benin
Elmohamady 7'; Moteab 23'	Report

Complexo da Sr. da Graça, Benguela
Attendance: 12,500
Referee: Daniel Bennett (South Africa)

GK	1	Essam El-Hadary		(substituted off) 76'
DF	14	Sayed Moawad
DF	2	Mahmoud Fathallah	(yellow card) 56'
DF	3	Ahmed Elmohamady
DF	5	Abdel-Zaher El-Saqqa		(substituted off) 53'
MF	19	Mohamed Abdel-Shafy
MF	12	Hossam Ghaly
MF	17	Ahmed Hassan
MF	8	Hosny Abd Rabo
FW	21	Ahmed Raouf		(substituted off) 67'
FW	10	Emad Moteab
Substitutions:
FW	9	Mohamed Zidan		(substituted on) 53'
FW	15	Gedo		(substituted on) 67'
GK	16	Abdelwahed El-Sayed		(substituted on) 76'
Manager:
Hassan Shehata

GK	1	Yoann Djidonou
DF	12	Félicien Singbo
DF	5	Damien Chrysostome
DF	3	Khaled Adénon	(yellow card) 47'
DF	7	Romuald Boco
MF	18	Séïdath Tchomogo		(substituted off) 88'
MF	4	Djiman Koukou
MF	13	Pascal Angan		(substituted off) 46'
MF	20	Arnaud Séka	(yellow card) 18'	(substituted off) 70'
FW	11	Mouritala Ogunbiyi
FW	8	Razak Omotoyossi
Substitutions:
FW	9	Mohamed Aoudou		(substituted on) 46'
FW	14	Mickaël Poté		(substituted on) 70'
MF	19	Jocelyn Ahouéya		(substituted on) 88'
Manager:
(France) Michel Dussuyer

== Nigeria vs Mozambique ==
20 January 2010
17:00

Nigeria	3–0	Mozambique
Odemwingie 45', 47'; Martins 86'	Report

Estádio Alto da Chela, Lubango
Attendance: 10,000
Referee: Koman Coulibaly (Mali)

GK	1	Vincent Enyeama
DF	6	Danny Shittu
DF	21	Uwa Elderson Echiéjilé
DF	22	Onyekachi Apam
DF	19	Yusuf Mohamed
MF	20	Dickson Etuhu	(substituted off) 72'
MF	10	John Obi Mikel
MF	15	Sani Kaita
FW	8	Yakubu	(substituted off) 68'
FW	11	Peter Odemwingie	(substituted off) 83'
FW	7	Chinedu Obasi
Substitutions:
FW	9	Obafemi Martins	(substituted on) 68'
MF	13	Ayila Yussuf	(substituted on) 72'
FW	18	Victor Obinna	(substituted on) 83'
Manager:
Shaibu Amodu

GK	12	Kapango	(yellow card) 81'
DF	5	Paíto
DF	16	Miró	(yellow card) 59'	(substituted off) 75'
DF	13	Fanuel
DF	18	Dario Khan
DF	21	Campira
MF	4	Simão
MF	7	Domingues	(yellow card) 36'
MF	3	Genito	(yellow card) 40'	(substituted off) 68'
MF	8	Dário		(substituted off) 83'
FW	9	Tico-Tico	(yellow card) 70'
Substitutions:
MF	20	Josemar		(substituted on) 68'
DF	2	Momed Hagi		(substituted on) 75'
MF	14	Danito		(substituted on) 83'
Manager:
(Netherlands) Mart Nooij
