= 2010 Africa Cup of Nations knockout stage =

The knockout stage of the 2010 Africa Cup of Nations was the second and final stage of the competition, following the group stage. It began on 24 January with the quarter-finals and ended on 31 January 2010 with the final held at the Estádio 11 de Novembro in Luanda. A total of 8 teams (the top two teams from each group) advanced to the knockout stage to compete in a single-elimination style tournament.

All match times are local, WAT (UTC+1).

== Format ==
In the knockout stage, except for the third place play-off, if a match was level at the end of 90 minutes of normal playing time, extra time was played (two periods of 15 minutes each). If still tied after extra time, the match was decided by a penalty shoot-out to determine the winner. In the third place play-off, if the scores remained level after 90 minutes the match would go directly to a penalty shoot-out, without any extra time being played.

== Qualified teams ==
The top two placed teams from each of the four groups qualified for the knockout stage.

Group	Winners	Runners-up
A	Angola	Algeria
B	Ivory Coast	Ghana
C	Egypt	Nigeria
D	Zambia	Cameroon

== Bracket ==
Quarter-finals
24 January – Luanda
Angola	0
Ghana	1
25 January – Lubango
Zambia	0 (4)
Nigeria (p)	0 (5)
24 January – Cabinda
Ivory Coast	2
Algeria (a.e.t.)	3
25 January – Benguela
Egypt (a.e.t.)	3
Cameroon	1

Semi-finals
28 January – Luanda
Ghana	1
Nigeria	0
28 January – Benguela
Algeria	0
Egypt	4

Final
31 January – Luanda
Ghana	0
Egypt	1
Third place play-off
30 January – Benguela
Nigeria	1
Algeria	0

== Quarter-finals ==
=== Angola vs Ghana ===
24 January 2010
17:00

Angola	0–1	Ghana
	Report	Gyan 15'

Estádio 11 de Novembro, Luanda
Attendance: 50,000
Referee: Mohamed Benouza (Algeria)

GK	13	Carlos
DF	5	Kali
DF	15	Rui Marques
DF	10	Zuela		(substituted off) 76'
MF	8	Xara
MF	11	Gilberto		(substituted off) 73'
MF	20	Stélvio		(substituted off) 57'
MF	21	Mabiná	(yellow card) 33'
FW	14	Djalma
FW	16	Flávio
FW	23	Manucho
Substitutions:
MF	7	Job		(substituted on) 57'
MF	17	Zé Kalanga		(substituted on) 73'
DF	3	Enoque		(substituted on) 76'
Manager:
(Portugal) Manuel José

GK	22	Richard Kingson
DF	2	Hans Sarpei
DF	12	Lee Addy
DF	15	Isaac Vorsah
DF	7	Samuel Inkoom
MF	19	Emmanuel Agyemang-Badu
MF	23	Haminu Draman		(substituted off) 79'
MF	13	André Ayew	(yellow card) 2'	(substituted off) 90+6'
MF	10	Kwadwo Asamoah
FW	11	Agyemang Opoku	(yellow card) 85'
FW	3	Asamoah Gyan		(substituted off) 62'
Substitutions:
FW	14	Matthew Amoah	(yellow card) 78'	(substituted on) 62'
DF	18	Eric Addo		(substituted on) 79'
MF	17	Ibrahim Ayew		(substituted on) 90+6'
Manager:
(Serbia) Milovan Rajevac

=== Ivory Coast vs Algeria ===
24 January 2010
20:30

Ivory Coast	2–3 (a.e.t.)	Algeria
Kalou 4'; Keïta 89'	Report	Matmour 39'; Bougherra 90+2'; Bouazza 92'

Estádio Chimandela, Cabinda
Attendance: 10,000
Referee: Eddy Maillet (Seychelles)

GK	1	Boubacar Barry
DF	4	Kolo Touré
DF	20	Guy Demel
DF	22	Sol Bamba
MF	17	Siaka Tiéné
MF	6	Yaya Touré	(yellow card) 120'
MF	5	Didier Zokora		(substituted off) 96'
MF	9	Cheick Tioté		(substituted off) 72'
FW	11	Didier Drogba
FW	8	Salomon Kalou		(substituted off) 83'
FW	10	Gervinho
Substitutions:
MF	7	Emerse Faé		(substituted on) 72'
MF	18	Abdul Kader Keïta		(substituted on) 83'
FW	15	Aruna Dindane		(substituted on) 96'
Manager:
(Bosnia and Herzegovina) Vahid Halilhodžić

GK	16	Faouzi Chaouchi
DF	2	Madjid Bougherra	(yellow card) 2'
DF	3	Nadir Belhadj
DF	4	Antar Yahia	(yellow card) 71'	(substituted off) 85'
DF	5	Rafik Halliche
MF	6	Yazid Mansouri
MF	20	Mourad Meghni		(substituted off) 90'
MF	13	Karim Matmour	(yellow card) 105+2'
MF	15	Karim Ziani		(substituted off) 106'
MF	19	Hassan Yebda
FW	9	Abdelkader Ghezzal
Substitutions:
DF	11	Slimane Raho		(substituted on) 85'
MF	18	Hameur Bouazza		(substituted on) 90'
MF	22	Djamel Abdoun		(substituted on) 106'
Manager:
Rabah Saâdane

=== Egypt vs Cameroon ===
25 January 2010
17:00

Egypt	3–1 (a.e.t.)	Cameroon
Hassan 37', 104'; Gedo 92'	Report	Hassan 25' (o.g.)

Complexo da Sr. da Graça, Benguela
Attendance: 12,000
Referee: Jerome Damon (South Africa)

GK	1	Essam El-Hadary
DF	6	Hany Said
DF	20	Wael Gomaa	(yellow card) 40'
DF	14	Sayed Moawad	(yellow card) 101'
DF	2	Mahmoud Fathallah
DF	3	Ahmed Elmohamady	(yellow card) 40'
MF	7	Ahmed Fathy
MF	17	Ahmed Hassan		(substituted off) 118'
MF	8	Hosny Abd Rabo	(yellow card) 20'	(substituted off) 85'
FW	9	Mohamed Zidan		(substituted off) 67'
FW	10	Emad Moteab
Substitutions:
FW	15	Gedo		(substituted on) 67'
MF	12	Hossam Ghaly		(substituted on) 85'
MF	19	Mohamed Abdel-Shafy		(substituted on) 118'
Manager:
Hassan Shehata

GK	1	Carlos Kameni
DF	6	Alex Song
DF	3	Nicolas N'Koulou	(yellow card) 57'
DF	12	Henri Bedimo		(substituted off) 105'
DF	5	Aurélien Chedjou	(red card) 112'
MF	20	Georges Mandjeck	(yellow card) 51'
MF	18	Eyong Enoh
MF	8	Geremi	(yellow card) 41'	(substituted off) 105'
MF	10	Achille Emana		(substituted off) 88'
FW	9	Samuel Eto'o
FW	17	Mohammadou Idrissou
Substitutions:
FW	15	Pierre Webó		(substituted on) 88'
DF	23	André Bikey		(substituted on) 105'
FW	14	Paul Alo'o		(substituted on) 105'
Manager:
(France) Paul Le Guen

=== Zambia vs Nigeria ===
25 January 2010
20:30

Zambia	0–0 (a.e.t.)	Nigeria
	Report
Penalties
Chivuta (penalty scored); C. Katongo (penalty scored); Mayuka (penalty scored); Nyrienda (penalty missed); Mweene (penalty scored)	4–5	(penalty scored) Mikel; (penalty scored) Martins; (penalty scored) Obinna; (penalty scored) Odemwingie; (penalty scored) Enyeama

Estádio Alto da Chela, Lubango
Attendance: 10,000
Referee: Essam Abd El Fatah (Egypt)

GK	16	Kennedy Mweene
DF	4	Joseph Musonda	(yellow card) 42'
DF	5	Hijani Himoonde	(yellow card) 21'
DF	6	Emmanuel Mbola
DF	19	Thomas Nyrienda
MF	13	Stoppila Sunzu
MF	10	Felix Katongo	(yellow card) 19'	(substituted off) 98'
MF	20	William Njovu		(substituted off) 114'
MF	11	Christopher Katongo	(yellow card) 78'
FW	12	James Chamanga		(substituted off) 68'
FW	7	Jacob Mulenga
Substitutions:
FW	21	Emmanuel Mayuka		(substituted on) 68'
MF	14	Noah Chivuta		(substituted on) 98'
MF	23	Clifford Mulenga		(substituted on) 114'
Manager:
(France) Hervé Renard

GK	1	Vincent Enyeama
DF	6	Danny Shittu
DF	21	Uwa Elderson Echiéjilé
DF	22	Onyekachi Apam	(yellow card) 60' (yellow-red card) 107'
DF	19	Yusuf Mohamed
MF	20	Dickson Etuhu		(substituted off) 62'
MF	10	John Obi Mikel
MF	15	Sani Kaita
FW	8	Yakubu		(substituted off) 70'
FW	11	Peter Odemwingie
FW	7	Chinedu Obasi		(substituted off) 90'
Substitutions:
MF	13	Ayila Yussuf		(substituted on) 62'
FW	9	Obafemi Martins		(substituted on) 70'
FW	18	Victor Obinna		(substituted on) 90'
Manager:
Shaibu Amodu

== Semi-finals ==
=== Ghana vs Nigeria ===
28 January 2010
16:00

Ghana	1–0	Nigeria
Gyan 21'	Report

Estádio 11 de Novembro, Luanda
Attendance: 7,500
Referee: Daniel Bennett (South Africa)

GK	22	Richard Kingson	(yellow card) 90+2'
MF	2	Hans Sarpei		(substituted off) 53'
DF	12	Lee Addy
DF	15	Isaac Vorsah
DF	7	Samuel Inkoom	(yellow card) 85'
MF	6	Anthony Annan	(yellow card) 56'
MF	19	Emmanuel Agyemang-Badu
MF	13	André Ayew
MF	10	Kwadwo Asamoah
FW	11	Agyemang Opoku		(substituted off) 35'
FW	3	Asamoah Gyan		(substituted off) 84'
Substitutions:
MF	23	Haminu Draman	(yellow card) 44'	(substituted on) 35'
MF	17	Abdul Rahim Ayew		(substituted on) 53'
FW	14	Matthew Amoah		(substituted on) 84'
Manager:
(Serbia) Milovan Rajevac

GK	1	Vincent Enyeama
DF	6	Danny Shittu
DF	21	Uwa Elderson Echiéjilé
DF	5	Obinna Nwaneri
DF	19	Yusuf Mohamed		(substituted off) 80'
MF	13	Ayila Yussuf	(yellow card) 37'	(substituted off) 67'
MF	10	John Obi Mikel
MF	15	Sani Kaita
FW	9	Obafemi Martins
FW	11	Peter Odemwingie		(substituted off) 70'
FW	7	Chinedu Obasi
Substitutions:
FW	18	Victor Obinna		(substituted on) 67'
FW	8	Yakubu		(substituted on) 70'
DF	17	Chidi Odiah		(substituted on) 80'
Manager:
Shaibu Amodu

=== Algeria vs Egypt ===
28 January 2010
20:30

Algeria	0–4	Egypt
	Report	Abd Rabo 38' (pen.); Zidan 65'; Abdel-Shafy 80'; Gedo 90+2'

Complexo da Sr. da Graça, Benguela
Attendance: 30,000
Referee: Coffi Codjia (Benin)

GK	16	Faouzi Chaouchi	(yellow card) 41' (yellow-red card) 81'
DF	2	Madjid Bougherra
DF	3	Nadir Belhadj	(red card) 70'
DF	4	Antar Yahia
DF	5	Rafik Halliche	(yellow card) 30' (yellow-red card) 38'
MF	6	Yazid Mansouri
MF	20	Mourad Meghni		(substituted off) 67'
MF	15	Karim Ziani
MF	13	Karim Matmour		(substituted off) 75'
MF	19	Hassan Yebda
FW	9	Abdelkader Ghezzal		(substituted off) 89'
Substitutions:
DF	14	Abdelkader Laïfaoui		(substituted on) 67'
MF	22	Djamel Abdoun		(substituted on) 75'
GK	23	Mohamed Zemmamouche		(substituted on) 89'
Manager:
Rabah Saâdane

GK	1	Essam El-Hadary
DF	6	Hany Said
DF	20	Wael Gomaa
DF	14	Sayed Moawad		(substituted off) 78'
DF	2	Mahmoud Fathallah	(yellow card) 36'	(substituted off) 59'
DF	3	Ahmed Elmohamady
MF	7	Ahmed Fathy
MF	17	Ahmed Hassan
MF	8	Hosny Abd Rabo
FW	9	Mohamed Zidan
FW	10	Emad Moteab		(substituted off) 52'
Substitutions:
MF	12	Hossam Ghaly		(substituted on) 52'
FW	15	Geddo		(substituted on) 59'
MF	19	Mohamed Abdel-Shafy		(substituted on) 78'
Manager:
Hassan Shehata

== Third place play-off ==
30 January 2010
17:00

Nigeria	1–0	Algeria
Obinna 56'	Report

Complexo da Sr. da Graça, Benguela
Attendance: 12,000
Referee: Badara Diatta (Senegal)

GK	1	Vincent Enyeama
DF	6	Danny Shittu
DF	3	Taye Taiwo
DF	22	Onyekachi Apam
DF	17	Chidi Odiah
MF	14	Seyi Olofinjana
MF	15	Sani Kaita
FW	16	Kalu Uche	(substituted off) 65'
FW	4	Nwankwo Kanu	(substituted off) 78'
FW	18	Victor Obinna
FW	7	Chinedu Obasi	(substituted off) 81'
Substitutions:
FW	9	Obafemi Martins	(substituted on) 65'
MF	10	John Obi Mikel	(substituted on) 78'
FW	11	Peter Odemwingie	(substituted on) 81'
Manager:
Shaibu Amodu

GK	23	Mohamed Zemmamouche
DF	2	Madjid Bougherra
DF	11	Slimane Raho
DF	17	Samir Zaoui	(yellow card) 50'
DF	12	Réda Babouche
MF	6	Yazid Mansouri
MF	20	Mourad Meghni		(substituted off) 58'
MF	15	Karim Ziani
MF	19	Hassan Yebda
MF	18	Hameur Bouazza		(substituted off) 59'
FW	9	Abdelkader Ghezzal		(substituted off) 85'
Substitutions:
MF	22	Djamel Abdoun		(substituted on) 58'
FW	21	Abdelmalek Ziaya		(substituted on) 59'
FW	10	Rafik Saïfi		(substituted on) 85'
Manager:
Rabah Saâdane

== Final ==
31 January 2010
17:00

Ghana	0–1	Egypt
	Report	Gedo 85'

Estádio 11 de Novembro, Luanda
Attendance: 50,000
Referee: Koman Coulibaly (Mali)

GK	22	Richard Kingson
RB	7	Samuel Inkoom
CB	15	Isaac Vorsah
CB	12	Lee Addy
LB	2	Hans Sarpei
CM	19	Emmanuel Agyemang-Badu
CM	6	Anthony Annan
RW	13	André Ayew
LW	10	Kwadwo Asamoah
CF	9	Agyemang Opoku	(yellow card) 47'	(substituted off) 89'
CF	3	Asamoah Gyan		(substituted off) 87'
Substitutions:
FW	20	Dominic Adiyiah		(substituted on) 87'
DF	18	Eric Addo		(substituted on) 89'
Manager:
(Serbia) Milovan Rajevac

GK	1	Essam El-Hadary
WB	3	Ahmed Al-Muhammadi	(yellow card) 52'
CB	7	Ahmed Fathy		(substituted off) 89'
CB	6	Hany Said
CB	20	Wael Gomaa
WB	14	Sayed Moawad	(yellow card) 48'	(substituted off) 57'
CM	17	Ahmed Hassan
CM	12	Hossam Ghaly	(yellow card) 60'
CM	8	Hosny Abd Rabo
CF	10	Emad Moteab		(substituted off) 70'
CF	9	Mohamed Zidan
Substitutions:
WB	19	Mohamed Abdel-Shafy		(substituted on) 57'
CF	15	Gedo		(substituted on) 70'
CB	4	Moatasem Salem		(substituted on) 89'
Manager:
Hassan Shehata
