= 2010 Africa Cup of Nations final =

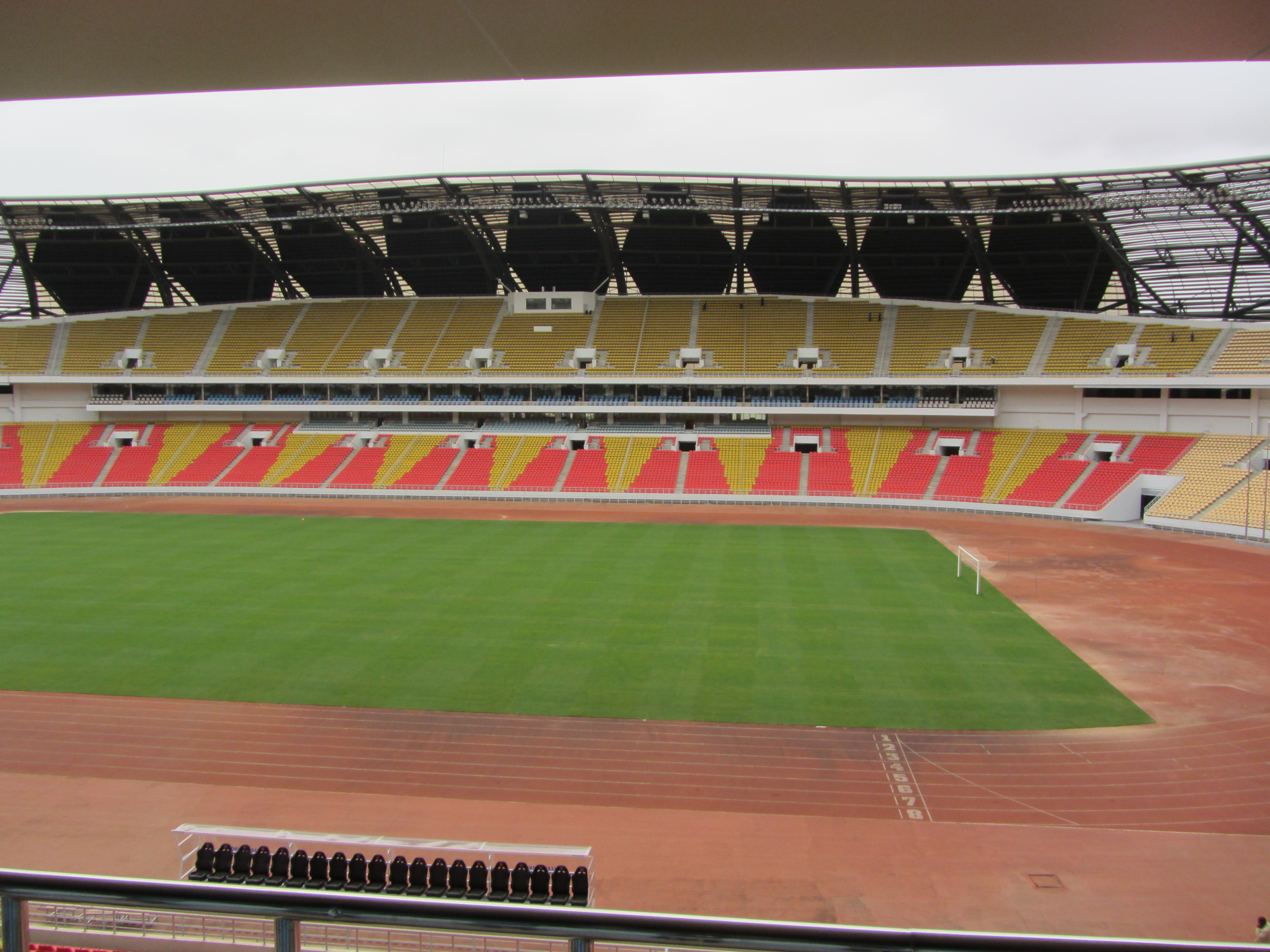
- Event: 2010 Africa Cup of Nations
Ghana	Egypt
(Ghana)	(Egypt)
0	1
- Date: 31 January 2010
- Venue: Estádio 11 de Novembro, Luanda
- Referee: Koman Coulibaly (Mali)
- Attendance: 50,000

The 2010 Africa Cup of Nations final was a football match that took place on 31 January 2010 at the Estádio 11 de Novembro in Luanda, Angola, to determine the winner of the 2010 Africa Cup of Nations, the football championship of Africa organized by the Confederation of African Football (CAF).

It was contested by Ghana and Egypt.

Egypt won the title for the seventh time by beating Ghana 1–0.

== Route to the final ==
Ghana
Round
Egypt
Opponent
Result
Group stage
Opponent
Result
Togo
Cancelled
Match 1
Nigeria
3–1
Ivory Coast
1–3
Match 2
Mozambique
2–0
Burkina Faso
1–0
Match 3
Benin
2–0

Pos	Team	Pld	W	D	L	GF	GA	GD	Pts	Qualification
1	Ivory Coast	2	1	1	0	3	1	+2	4	Advance to knockout stage
2	Ghana	2	1	0	1	2	3	−1	3	Advance to knockout stage
3	Burkina Faso	2	0	1	1	0	1	−1	1	
4	Togo (D)	0	0	0	0	0	0	0	0 (Note: Togo withdrew from the tournament due to the attack on their team bus while traveling to their opening match against Ghana, thus they were officially disqualified. Group B became a three-team group.)	

Source: CAF
(D) Disqualified
Notes:
Final standing

Pos	Team	Pld	W	D	L	GF	GA	GD	Pts	Qualification
1	Egypt	3	3	0	0	7	1	+6	9	Advance to knockout stage
2	Nigeria	3	2	0	1	5	3	+2	6	Advance to knockout stage
3	Benin	3	0	1	2	2	5	−3	1	
4	Mozambique	3	0	1	2	2	7	−5	1	

Source: CAF
Opponent
Result
Knockout stage
Opponent
Result
Angola
1–0
Quarterfinals
Cameroon
3–1 (aet)
Nigeria
1–0
Semifinals
Algeria
4–0

== Match details ==
=== Details ===
31 January 2010
17:00

Ghana	0–1	Egypt
	Report	Gedo 85'

Estádio 11 de Novembro, Luanda
Attendance: 50,000
Referee: Koman Coulibaly (Mali)

Ghana	Egypt

GK	22	Richard Kingson (c)
RB	7	Samuel Inkoom
CB	15	Isaac Vorsah
CB	12	Lee Addy
LB	2	Hans Sarpei
CM	6	Anthony Annan
CM	19	Emmanuel Badu
RW	10	Kwadwo Asamoah
AM	9	Agyemang Opoku	(yellow card) 47'	(substituted off) 89'
LW	13	André Ayew
CF	3	Asamoah Gyan		(substituted off) 87'
Substitutions:
FW	20	Dominic Adiyiah		(substituted on) 87'
DF	18	Eric Addo		(substituted on) 89'
Manager:
(Serbia) Milovan Rajevac

GK	1	Essam El-Hadary
RB	7	Ahmed Fathy		(substituted off) 89'
CB	20	Wael Gomaa
CB	6	Hany Said
LB	14	Sayed Moawad	(yellow card) 48'	(substituted off) 57'
DM	3	Ahmed Elmohamady	(yellow card) 52'
RM	12	Hossam Ghaly	(yellow card) 60'
LM	8	Hosny Abd Rabo
AM	17	Ahmed Hassan (c)
CF	9	Mohamed Zidan
CF	10	Emad Moteab		(substituted off) 70'
Substitutions:
DF	19	Mohamed Abdel-Shafy		(substituted on) 57'
FW	15	Gedo		(substituted on) 70'
DF	4	Moatasem Salem		(substituted on) 89'
Manager:
(Egypt) Hassan Shehata

Assistant referees:
Évarist Menkouande (Cameroon)
Rédouane Achik (Morocco)
Fourth official:
Hélder Carvalho (Angola)
