= Danito Parruque =

Mozambican footballer (born 1983)

Danito
Personal information
- Full name: Carlos Danito Parruque
- Date of birth: 5 June 1983 (age 43)
- Place of birth: Maputo, Mozambique
- Position: Midfielder

Team information
- Current team: Clube Ferroviário de Maputo

Senior career*
Years	Team	Apps	(Gls)
2002–	Clube Ferroviário de Maputo		

International career
2005–	Mozambique	7	(1)
- * Club domestic league appearances and goals

Carlos Danito Parruque (born 5 June 1983) is a Mozambican footballer. He plays for Clube Ferroviário de Maputo as a midfielder. He was called to Mozambique national football team at the 2010 Africa Cup of Nations.
