= Fanuel Massingue =

Mozambican footballer

Fanuel
Personal information
- Full name: Alberto Fanuel Massingue
- Date of birth: 19 December 1982 (age 43)
- Place of birth: Maputo, Mozambique
- Height: 1.90 m (6 ft 3 in)
- Position: Defender

Team information
- Current team: HCB Songo

Senior career*
Years	Team	Apps	(Gls)
2002–2008	Maxaquene		
2008–2011	Liga Muçulmana		
2012	Maxaquene		
2013–	HCB Songo		

International career
2007–2010	Mozambique	24	(1)
- * Club domestic league appearances and goals

Fanuel Massingue (born 19 December 1982) is a Mozambican international footballer who plays for HCB Songo in Moçambola. He was called to Mozambique national football team at the 2010 Africa Cup of Nations.
