= Arnaud Séka =

Beninese footballer

Personal information
- Full name: Sylvestre Arnaud Séka
- Date of birth: 30 October 1985 (age 40)
- Place of birth: Abomey, Benin
- Height: 1.55 m (5 ft 1 in)
- Position: Midfielder

Team information
- Current team: Tonnerre d'Abomey FC
- Number: 10

Senior career*
Years	Team	Apps	(Gls)
2005–	Tonnerre d'Abomey FC	54	(14)

International career^{‡}
2010–	Benin	5	(0)
- * Club domestic league appearances and goals ‡ National team caps and goals as of November 10, 2013

Sylvestre Arnaud Séka (born 30 October 1985 in Abomey) is a Beninese football player who currently plays in Benin for Tonnerre d'Abomey FC.

== International career ==
Séka played his debut for the Benin national football team at 2010 African Cup of Nations in Angola.
