= Félicien Singbo =

Beninese footballer

Personal information
- Full name: Félicien Houenou Singbo
- Date of birth: 25 October 1980 (age 45)
- Place of birth: Abomey, Benin
- Height: 1.86 m (6 ft 1 in)
- Position: Defender

Youth career
- 1998: Etoile Porto Novo
- 1999: Kadji Sports Academy

Senior career*
Years	Team	Apps	(Gls)
1999–2001	Rouen	7	(0)
2001–2003	Louhans-Cuiseaux		
2003–2004	Airdrie United	6	(0)
2004	Vllaznia	8	(0)
2005–2006	PAS Giannina	21	(1)
2006	Pierikos	14	(4)
2007	AE Paphos	10	(0)
2007	Ayia Napa	12	(0)
2008	Olympiacos Volos	9	(0)
2009–2010	Lokomotiv Plovdiv	25	(2)
2010–2012	Diagoras Rhodos		
2013–2015	Missile FC		
2017	Requins de l'Atlantique FC		

International career
2000–2010	Benin	20	(0)
- * Club domestic league appearances and goals

Félicien Houenou Singbo (born 25 October 1980) is a Beninese former professional footballer who played as a defender. Between 2002 and he made 19 appearances for the Benin national team. In 2003, he received French nationality.

== Club career ==
Singbo played for Rouen and Louhans-Cuiseaux in France, Airdrie United in Scotland, Vllaznia in Albania, PAS Giannina, Olympiacos Volos and Pierikos in Greece, AE Paphos and Ayia Napa in Cyprus.

Lokomotiv Plovdiv signed Singbo to an 18-month-long deal on 13 February 2009. He was given the number 30 shirt. He made his competitive debut for Loko on 6 March 2009 against OFC Sliven 2000, in round of 16 of the Bulgarian top division.

Singbo signed with Missile Football Club of Gabon for two years on 25 October 2013.

== International career ==
Singbo was part of the Benin national team's squad at the 2004 African Nations Cup, which finished bottom of its group in the first round of competition, thus failing to secure qualification for the quarter-finals. He was also part of the Benin squad for the 2010 African Nations Cup that did not advance past the group stage.
