= João Rafael Kapango =

Mozambican footballer

João Kapango
Personal information
- Full name: João Rafael Kapango
- Date of birth: 14 September 1975 (age 51)
- Place of birth: Maputo, Mozambique
- Height: 1.92 m (6 ft 4 in)
- Position: Goalkeeper

Youth career
- Ferroviário Maputo

Senior career*
Years	Team	Apps	(Gls)
1995–2004	Ferroviário Maputo	87	(0)
2004–2012	Tersana	219	(0)
2012–2013	Ferroviário Maputo	0	(0)
2013	Tersana	0	(0)

International career^{‡}
1996–2012	Mozambique	58	(0)
- * Club domestic league appearances and goals ‡ National team caps and goals as of 6 February 2010

João Rafael Kapango (born 14 September 1975 in Maputo) is a Mozambican football goalkeeper.

== International career ==
He is an international football player and played the 2010 Africa Cup of Nations in Angola.

He became notable in the 2010 African Cup of Nations during the game against Benin, when he came to collect a routine overhit pass and made a bizarre attempt at a salto whilst gathering the ball. Whilst he narrowly avoided conceding a goal, he injured his neck in the process. The incident has become a minor YouTube hit.
