= Clifford Mulenga =

Zambian footballer (born 1987)

Personal information
- Full name: Clifford Mulenga
- Date of birth: 5 August 1987 (age 39)
- Place of birth: Kabompo, Zambia
- Height: 1.69 m (5 ft 7 in)
- Position: Left winger

Team information
- Current team: Forest Rangers F.C.

Youth career
- Chiparamba Great Eagles

Senior career*
Years	Team	Apps	(Gls)
2004–2008	University of Pretoria F.C.	57	(9)
2005	→ Örgryte IS (loan)	11	(0)
2008–2009	Bidvest Wits	11	(1)
2009	→ Thanda Royal Zulu (loan)	11	(4)
2009–2010	Mpumalanga Black Aces	22	(7)
2010–2012	Bloemfontein Celtic	43	(7)
2012–2013	SuperSport United	12	(2)
2013–2014	Mpumalanga Black Aces	15	(1)
2014–2015	Ajax Cape Town	10	(0)
2015	ZESCO United		
2015–2016	Moroka Swallows	7	(2)
2016–2017	Mbombela United	22	(12)
2017–2018	Jomo Cosmos	17	(5)
2020-	Forest Rangers F.C.		

International career
2005–2012	Zambia	28	(4)
- * Club domestic league appearances and goals as of 08:46, 19 August 2020 (UTC)

Clifford Mulenga (born 5 August 1987) is a Zambian professional footballer who plays as a left winger for Forest Rangers F.C.

== Career ==
Mulenga was born in Kabompo, Zambia.

was part of the Zambian 2006 African Nations Cup team who finished third in group C in the first round of competition, thus failing to secure qualification for the quarter-finals.

Mulenga is known to be a quick and creative winger whose qualities have been praised as rare and akin to Zambian great Kalusha Bwalya. When playing for the Zambian U-20s he caught the eye of several European clubs most notably Spanish giants Real Madrid and PSV Eindhoven. His silky skills were demonstrated especially against the Nigerian U-20s at the African Youth Championships when his team lost in the semi-finals, a game which saw him give a man of the match performance only to be blighted by receiving a red card as a result of a petulant altercation with one of his opponents.

Prior to the 2008 Africa Cup of Nations a dispute arose as to which club Mulenga belonged to University of Pretoria F.C. claimed he was on their books however he caused controversy with the Zambian press when the nation's football authority FAZ, announced he was to join Israeli side Maccabi Petah Tikva from Örgryte IS the Swedish side which acquired him on loan from the University of Pretoria.

On 2 February 2008, Mulenga was named The 2007 Glo-CAF Young Player of the Year beating off competition from Congo Brazzaville's Franchel Ibara and Nigeria's Oseni Gani both of whom have been touted as future African stars.

The deal with Maccabi Petach Tikva fell through and he signed for Premier Soccer league team Bidvest Wits. In July 2009 he was trial by Maccabi Petach Tikva again but the club decided to not sign him. He consequently signed for the Mpumalanga Black Aces.

He has also played for Bloemfontein Celtic and SuperSport United.

Mulenga returned Mpumalanga Black Aces in September 2013 on a three-year contract. In August 2014, he signs a contract with Ajax Cape Town for one season.

== Career statistics ==
Scores and results list Zambia's goal tally first.

No.	Date	Venue	Opponent	Score	Result	Competition
1.	1 June 2005	FNB Stadium, Johannesburg, South Africa	Gabon	1–0	1–0	Friendly
2.	25 May 2008	Azadi Stadium, Tehran, Iran	Iran	1–2	2–3	Friendly
3.	17 January 2010	Estádio Nacional da Tundavala, Lubango, Angola	Cameroon	1–0	2–3	2010 Africa Cup of Nations
4.	9 February 2011	Mavuso Sports Centre, Manzini, Swaziland	Swaziland	4–0	4–0	Friendly

== Honours ==
Zambia

- Africa Cup of Nations: 2012

Individual

- Glo-CAF Young Player of the Year: 2007
