= Yoann Djidonou =

Footballer (born 1986)

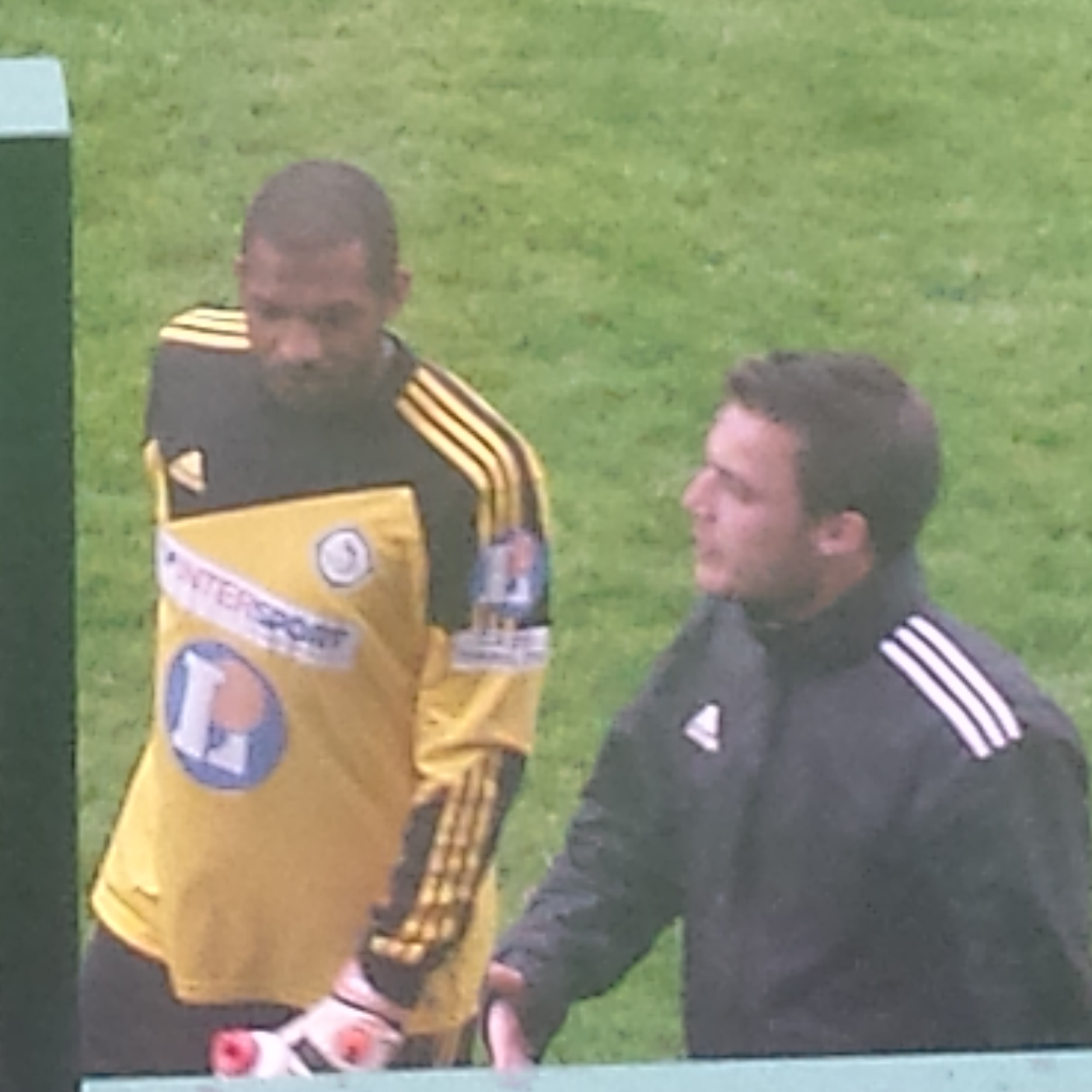
- Djidonou in 2015

Personal information
- Date of birth: 17 May 1986 (age 40)
- Place of birth: Domont, France
- Height: 1.80 m (5 ft 11 in)
- Position: Goalkeeper

Team information
- Current team: Romorantin
- Number: 16

Senior career*
Years	Team	Apps	(Gls)
2004–2005	Racing Paris	3	(0)
2005–2006	Entente SSG	0	(0)
2006–2009	Red Star	82	(0)
2009–2010	Libourne	26	(0)
2010–2011	Racing Paris	4	(0)
2011–2013	Mulhouse	65	(0)
2013–	Romorantin	256	(0)

International career
2007–2010	Benin	21	(0)
- * Club domestic league appearances and goals as of 19 May 2024 (UTC)

Yoann Djidonou (born 17 May 1986) is a professional footballer who plays as a goalkeeper for Championnat National 1 club Romorantin. Born in France, he is a former Benin international.

== Club career ==
Born in Domont, France, Djidonou has played club football for Racing Paris, Entente SSG, Red Star, Libourne, Racing Paris and Mulhouse. In June 2013, he signed for Championnat National 2 side Romorantin.

== International career ==
Djidonou made his international debut for Benin in 2007, and represented them at the Africa Cup of Nations in 2008 and 2010. He has also represented them in FIFA World Cup qualifying matches.
