= Mart Nooij =

Dutch football manager (born 1954)

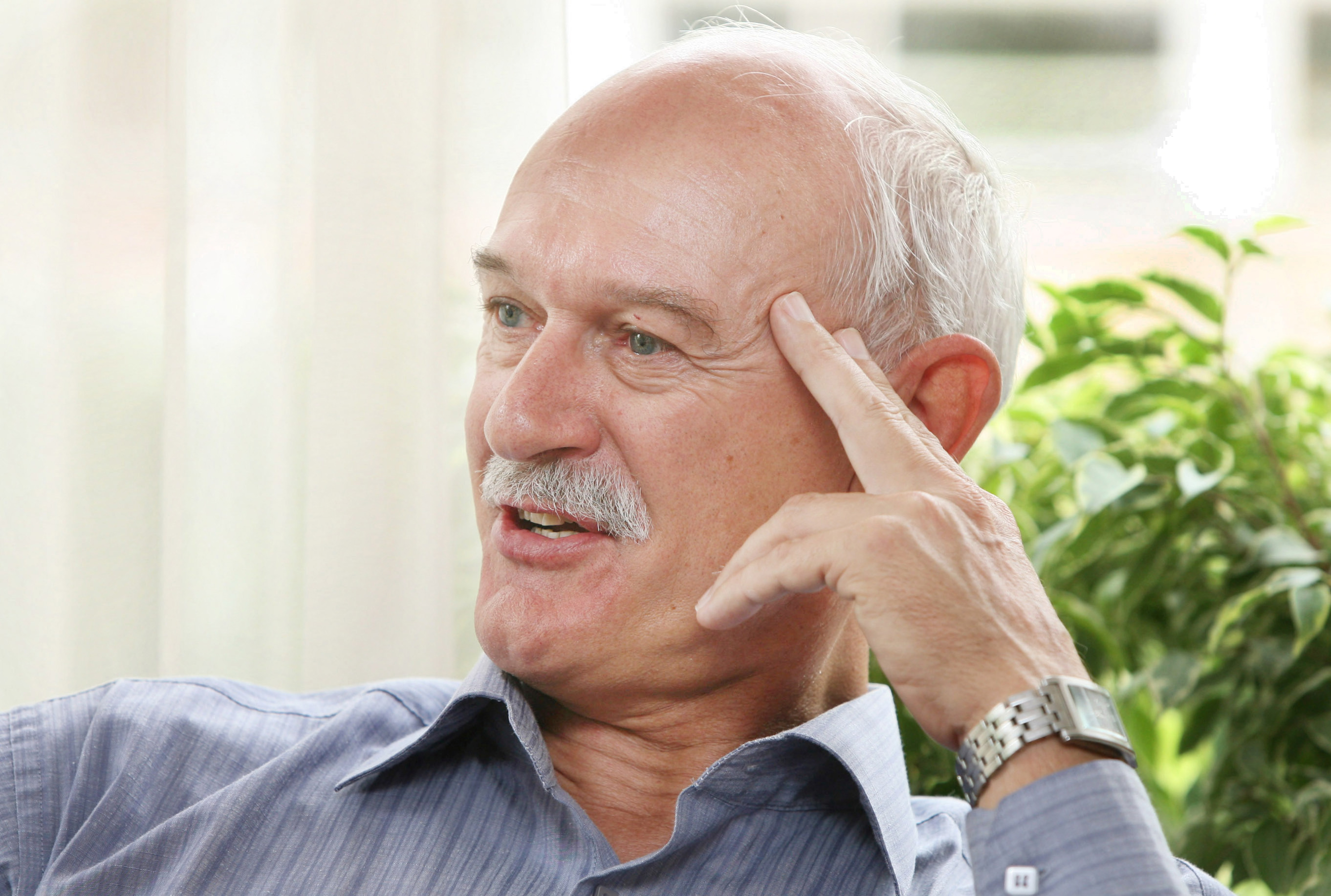

Personal information
- Full name: Martinus Ignatius Nooij
- Date of birth: 3 June 1954 (age 72)
- Place of birth: Heemskerk, Netherlands

Managerial career
- Years: Team
- 2003: Burkina Faso U20
- 2007–2011: Mozambique
- 2012: Santos Cape Town
- 2013–2014: Saint George
- 2014–2015: Tanzania

Martinus Ignatius "Mart" Nooij (born 3 July 1954) is a Dutch football manager.

== Career ==
Nooij became a development trainer at the Royal Dutch Football Association. He worked for EVC 1913 in the United States and Kazakhstan. He was manager of the Burkina Faso U-20 team at the 2003 FIFA World Youth Championship. In 2004, he was temporarily assistant-coach at Dutch side FC Volendam.

In 2007, he was appointed head coach of the Mozambique national football team. As the manager of Mozambique he qualified the squad for the 2010 African Cup of Nations following a 12-year hiatus from the tournament finals. Mozambique finished bottom of their group with one draw and two losses. After failing to reach the 2012 African Cup of Nations, Nooij resigned from his managerial position in September 2011. He was replaced by German coach Gert Engels.

On 19 April 2012, he was named as the head coach of Premier Soccer League side Santos, but was sacked 18 December 2012.

In November 2013, Nooij became the head coach of the Ethiopian side Saint George and five months later, he accepted the head coaching job of Tanzania on 25 April 2014. He was sacked in June 2015.
