= Damien Chrysostome =

Beninese footballer (born 1982)

Personal information
- Full name: Koffi Damien Anderson Chrysostome
- Date of birth: 24 May 1982 (age 44)
- Place of birth: Cotonou, Benin
- Height: 1.81 m (5 ft 11 in)
- Position: Defender

Senior career*
Years	Team	Apps	(Gls)
2002–2004	Cittadella	20	(1)
2004–2005	Biellese	15	(1)
2005–2006	Cittadella	26	(0)
2006–2007	Cuneo	18	(1)
2007–2008	Casale	24	(0)
2008–2009	Metz	19	(0)
2009–2011	Denizlispor	47	(2)
2012	JJK	0	(0)
Total		169	(5)

International career
2002–2011	Benin	58	(0)
- * Club domestic league appearances and goals

Damien Koffi Anderson Chrysostome (born 24 May 1982) is a Beninese former professional footballer who played as a defender. He spent much of his career in the Italian lower leagues before joining French club Metz for the 2008–09 season. The following two seasons he played for Turkish side Denizlispor. He ended his career in Finland with JJK Jyväskylä. At international level, he made 58 appearances for the Benin national team.

== Club career ==
Chrysostome was born in Cotonou, Benin. In Italy he was a member of the A.S. Cittadella Serie C1 squad for the 2002–03 and 2003–04 seasons and part of the 2004–05 season. The rest of 2004–05 was spent with A.S. Biellese 1902 in Serie C2. He returned to Cittadella for the 2005–06 season, then moved to Associazione Calcio Cuneo 1905 for the 2005–06 season in Serie C2. During the 2007–08 season he appeared for Casale in Serie D.

== International career ==
In 2001, Chrysostome appeared in all three of his country's matches in the 2004 African Nations Cup. The Benin national team lost all three of their games in the first round of competition, and failed to secure qualification for the quarter-finals. He was ever-present in the 2008 tournament, when again Benin failed to progress beyond the group stage.
