= Dario Khan =

Mozambican footballer

Personal information
- Full name: Dario Ivan Khan
- Date of birth: 24 January 1984 (age 42)
- Place of birth: Maputo, Mozambique
- Height: 1.79 m (5 ft 10 in)
- Position: Defender

Senior career*
Years	Team	Apps	(Gls)
2003–2004	Ferroviario de Maputo		
2004–2008	Al-Hilal		
2009	Ismaily SC	10	(0)
2009–2011	Al-Kharitiyath	36	(3)
2011–2012	Liga Muçulmana de Maputo		
2012	Al-Kharitiyath	9	(1)
2013–2016	Costa do Sol		
2016–2017	GD Maputo	0	(0)

International career^{‡}
2003–2017	Mozambique	53	(2)
- * Club domestic league appearances and goals as of May 14, 2014 ‡ National team caps and goals as of May 14, 2014

Dario Ivan Khan (born 24 January 1984 in Mozambique) is a Mozambican former football defender who last played for GD Maputo. Khan was a member of the Mozambique national football team.

Dario Khan joined Egyptian side Ismaily from Sudanese club Al-Hilal in January 2009.

He scored two own goals during the 2010 Africa Cup of Nations, in the group matches against Benin and Egypt.
