= Estádio Nacional do Chiazi =

Sports venue in Cabinda, Angola

Coordinates: 5°30′28″S 12°14′25″E

- Interactive map of Estádio Nacional do Chiazi
- Location: Cabinda, Angola
- Capacity: 20,000

Construction
- Opened: 2010

The Estádio Nacional do Chiazi is a multi-use stadium in Cabinda, Angola. Completed in 2010, it is used mostly for football matches. The stadium hosted some events for the 2010 African Cup of Nations. It holds 20,000 people.
