= Onyekachi Apam =

Nigerian footballer (born 1986)

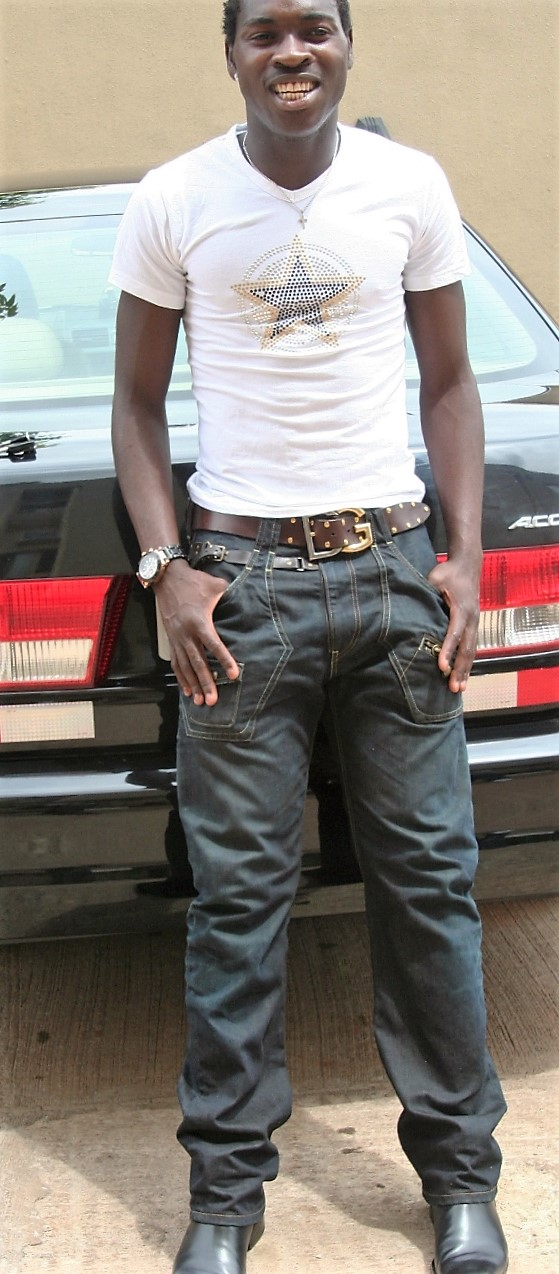

Personal information
- Date of birth: 30 December 1986 (age 39)
- Place of birth: Aba, Nigeria
- Height: 1.77 m (5 ft 10 in)
- Position: Defender

Youth career
- –2003: Pepsi Football Academy
- 2004–2005: Enugu Rangers
- 2005–2006: Nice

Senior career*
Years	Team	Apps	(Gls)
2006–2010	Nice	105	(1)
2010–2014	Rennes	23	(0)
2014	Seattle Sounders FC	0	(0)
Total		128	(1)

International career
2005	Nigeria U20	6	(0)
2008	Nigeria U23	5	(0)
2007–2010	Nigeria	14	(0)
Medal record
Representing Nigeria
Men's Football
Silver medal – second place	2008 Beijing	Team competition
- * Club domestic league appearances and goals

Onyekachi Apam (born 30 December 1986) is a Nigerian former professional footballer who played as a defender. He represented Nigeria at the 2008 Summer Olympics in Beijing as part of the men's football team.

== Club career ==
In 2005, Apam tried out for Nice, where he eventually signed. He made 105 appearances and extended his contract to end in 2013 rather than 2012 before transferring to Rennes in 2010. Apam sat out most his time at Rennes due first to a knee injury and later to an ankle injury. He left Rennes in early 2014 after appearing only 23 times in four years and signed with Seattle Sounders FC in September just before the MLS roster freeze. He was released without making an appearance on 5 December.

== International career ==
During his career, Apam represented Nigeria's national team 14 times, including the 2005 FIFA World Youth Championship; the 2008 Africa Cup and the Summer Olympics; and the FIFA World Cup and the Africa Cup of Nations in 2010. Nigeria won a silver medal at the 2008 Olympics.

== Personal life ==
Apam is of Igbo descent.

On 31 December 2007 in Enugu, Apam's car was stolen and he was kidnapped for forty-five minutes before being released.

Apam's nephew is footballer Lesley Ugochukwu, who also played for Rennes until 2023.
