= Yusuf Mohamed (footballer, born 1983) =

Nigerian footballer

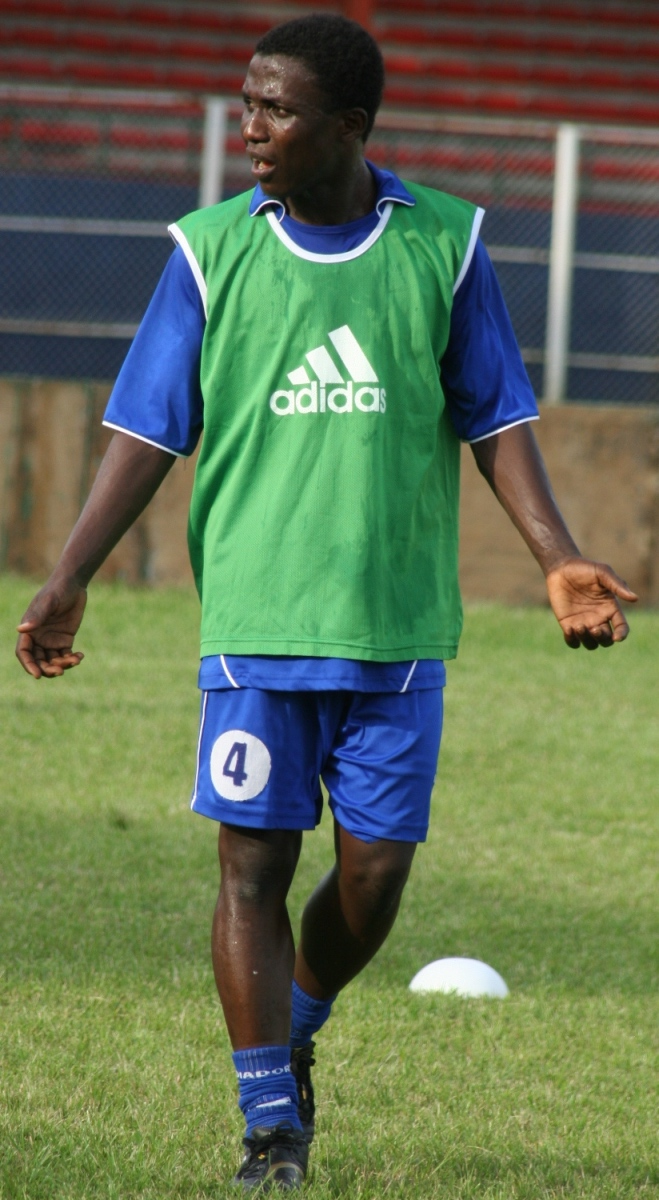

Personal information
- Date of birth: 5 November 1983 (age 42)
- Place of birth: Aba, Nigeria
- Height: 1.77 m (5 ft 10 in)
- Position: Right-back

Youth career
- El-Kanemi Warriors

Senior career*
Years	Team	Apps	(Gls)
2002–2006	Enyimba		
2006–2008	Al-Hilal		
2009–2010	Sion	6	(0)
2010–2011	Al-Hilal		

International career
2008–2011	Nigeria	13	(0)
- * Club domestic league appearances and goals

Yusuf Mohamed (born 5 November 1983) is a Nigerian former professional footballer who played as a right-back.

== Career ==
Mohamed won the African Champions league title with Enyimba in 2003 and 2004, before moving to Sudanese club Al-Hilal.

On 23 January 2009, he completed a move to Swiss side FC Sion from Al-Hilal. Mohammed underwent a medical and agreed on a three-and-a-half-year deal in time to beat the transfer deadline, following in the footsteps of compatriot Obinna Nwaneri, who also joined Sion in 2007 after breaking into the Nigeria national team squad.

Mohammed earned 13 caps for the Super Eagles, previously passed a trial with French side Paris Saint-Germain, but opted to fulfill a pre-contract agreement with the Switzerland club instead.

He returned to Al-Hilal in May 2010. He was later rehabbing from an injury suffered at the 2010 Africa Cup of Nations that led to him being excluded from the 2010 FIFA World Cup team.

== Honours ==
- CAF Champions League: 2003, 2004
- Sudan Premier League: 2005, 2006, 2007
