= Campira =

Mozambican footballer

Personal information
- Full name: Samuel Luis Chapanga
- Date of birth: 9 April 1982 (age 44)
- Place of birth: Maputo, Mozambique
- Height: 1.83 m (6 ft 0 in)
- Position: Defender

Senior career*
Years	Team	Apps	(Gls)
2003	Têxtil do Punguè		
2004	Lokomotiv Moscow II	19	(0)
2005–2006	Dinamo Zagreb	0	(0)
2006	Costa do Sol		
2007–2009	Maxaquene		
2010	Liga Muçulmana		
2011–	Maxaquene		

International career
2003–2011	Mozambique	26	(0)
- * Club domestic league appearances and goals

Samuel Luis Chapanga, better known simply as Campira (born 9 April 1982) is a Mozambican former professional football played as a defender. He made 26 appearances for the Mozambique national team.

== Career ==
Campira became one of the regular players in the right side of the defence of the Mozambique national football team over the years, gaining a total of 13 caps by December 2009. At club level he has played most of his career in the historical Clube de Desportos do Maxaquene with short spells at Grupo Desportivo da Companhia Têxtil do Punguè (2003–2004) and another historic, Clube de Desportos da Costa do Sol (2006). He also had some unsuccessful experiencies abroad, where he failed to adapt, namely at Russian Lokomotiv Moscow (2004–2005) and Croatian Dinamo Zagreb (2005–2006).

== External sources ==
- Campira at National-Football-Teams.com
