= Shuaibu Amodu =

Nigerian football manager (1958–2016)

Personal information
- Date of birth: 18 April 1958
- Date of death: 10 June 2016 (aged 58)
- Place of death: Benin City, Nigeria
- Position: Striker

Senior career*
Years	Team	Apps	(Gls)
1976–1978	Dumez		
1978–1981	Niger Tornadoes		

Managerial career
- 2002–2003: Enyimba
- BCC Lions
- El-Kanemi Warriors
- Shooting Stars
- 1994–1995: Nigeria
- 1996–1997: Nigeria
- 1996–1997: Orlando Pirates
- 2001–2002: Nigeria
- 2008–2010: Nigeria
- 2014: Nigeria
- 2015: Nigeria (caretaker)
Medal record
Men's football
Representing Nigeria (as manager)
Africa Cup of Nations
Bronze medal – third place	2002
Bronze medal – third place	2010
- * Club domestic league appearances and goals

Shuaibu Amodu (18 April 1958 – 10 June 2016) was a Nigerian football player and coach who played as a forward.

== Playing career ==
Amodu, a striker, played for Dumez and Niger Tornadoes. His playing career ended after he broke his leg.

== Coaching career ==
Amodu managed a number of club sides in Nigeria, such as Enyimba FC, BCC Lions, El-Kanemi Warriors and Shooting Stars; he also managed Orlando Pirates in South Africa.

Amodu first managed the Nigeria national team from April 2001 to February 2002. He later stated that his dismissal was "unfair", and also said that, a month later, he had yet to receive a formal letter confirming his dismissal. After his dismissal with the National team, He was appointed to take over from the newly sacked Enyimba's Coach Yugoslav Kostadin Papic in April 2002.

He was re-appointed manager in April 2008. In December 2009 the Nigeria Football Federation stated that Amodu was under pressure, and in January 2010 there was speculation about his future. He was sacked in February 2010.

Prior to his appointment as the technical director of Nigeria's national teams in May 2013. Amodu was unbeaten in three successful World Cup elimination series without losing a single match in 1998 (started the campaign), 2002 (finished the campaign), and 2010 (both started and completed the campaign), but never led the team to the World Cup.

He was re-appointed Nigeria manager in October 2014, replacing Stephen Keshi. It was his fifth spell in charge of the country. Keshi returned to the role two weeks later but was fired in July 2015 and Amodu took over the Eagles again temporarily. He was replaced by Sunday Oliseh on a permanent basis later that month.

== Later life and death ==
Amodu died on 10 June 2016, three days after the death of Stephen Keshi. He was buried in an Islamic ceremony in his hometown of Okpella.
