= Ahmed Hassan (footballer, born 1975) =

Egyptian footballer

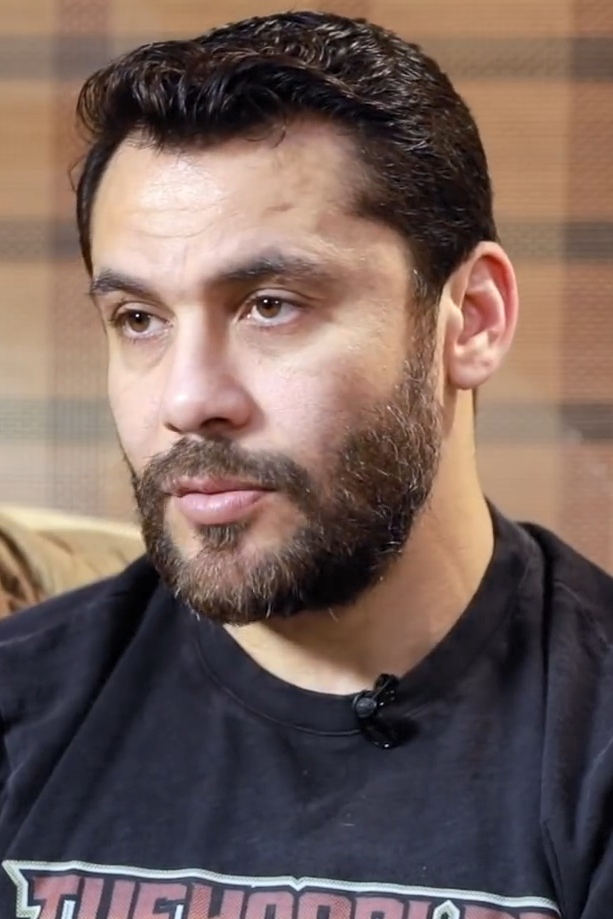
- Hassan in 2019

Personal information
- Full name: Ahmed Hassan Kamel Hussein
- Date of birth: 2 May 1975 (age 51)
- Place of birth: Maghagha, Egypt
- Height: 1.75 m (5 ft 9 in)
- Positions: Attacking midfielder; right winger

Youth career
- 1991–1995: Ismaily

Senior career*
Years	Team	Apps	(Gls)
1995–1997	Aswan	15	(7)
1997–1998	Ismaily	22	(6)
1998–2000	Kocaelispor	49	(5)
2000–2001	Denizlispor	30	(8)
2001–2003	Gençlerbirliği	41	(23)
2003–2006	Beşiktaş	79	(30)
2006–2008	Anderlecht	56	(20)
2008–2011	Al Ahly	59	(14)
2011–2013	Zamalek	25	(10)
Total		376	(123)

International career
1995–2012	Egypt	184	(33)

Managerial career
- 2015: Petrojet
Medal record
Men's football
Representing Egypt
Africa Cup of Nations
Winner	1998 Burkina Faso
Winner	2006 Egypt
Winner	2008 Ghana
Winner	2010 Angola
- * Club domestic league appearances and goals

Ahmed Hassan Kamel Hussein (Arabic: أحمد حسن كامل حسين; born 2 May 1975) is an Egyptian former professional footballer who played as an attacking midfielder or on the right wing. He is the eighth-most capped international male footballer in history, having made 184 appearances for the Egypt national team. Hassan is regarded as one of the best players in African football history.

== Club career ==
=== Early career ===
Ahmed Hassan started his professional football career as a right-back at Aswan Club in the Egyptian lower divisions. After one season there, he moved to the more successful Ismaily. He was 20 when he was selected for the first time to play in the Egyptian national team's friendly match against Ghana on 29 December 1995. After his impressive performances with the national team in the African Cup of Nations 1998, including scoring a goal from a long range shot against South Africa in the final that helped Egypt win the tournament, Hassan joined Turkish side Kocaelispor at the age of 22. In 2000, he was transferred to Denizlispor before joining his Egyptian international teammate Abdel-Zaher El-Saqua in 2001 when he moved to Gençlerbirliği. Following three successful seasons with the club, during which the team twice made the Turkish Cup Final, he moved to Beşiktaş where he was a first team regular as well as a regular on the team's scoring sheet. He particularly impressed manager Jean Tigana who, despite being known for selecting younger players for his first team, still regarded the 30-year-old Hassan a key player of the squad. Tigana stated that "Hassan is a hardworking player who is quick and talented."

=== Anderlecht ===
After Hassan was named "Best Player of the African Cup of Nations 2006" he met Ziyad Abou Chair who gave him licence to play in foreign countries; Fulham, Rangers, Newcastle United, and Espanyol were reportedly interested in signing him. However, he chose to move to R.S.C. Anderlecht, the Belgian First Division champions, on a free transfer after choosing not to extend his contract with Beşiktaş, which ended in 2006. Hassan joined Anderlecht due to its automatic qualification to the UEFA Champions League and became an important part of the Anderlecht attack, setting up and scoring goals himself. His position in the midfield was in front of Lucas Biglia and Jan Polák, just behind the strikers Serhat Akin and Nicolas Frutos. In the 2007–08 season, he stated that that season would be his last for Anderlecht. His family had already returned to Egypt, and he followed them there at the end of the season.

=== Return to Egypt ===
Ahmed Hassan chose to move to Egyptian club Al Ahly to end his career in Egypt, signing a three-year contract as of May 2008. He scored in his first competitive match against legendary rival Zamalek, in the opening match of the CAF Champions League, from a long-range free-kick. In September 2010 he suffered a career-threatening injury in an African Cup of Nations qualifier against Sierra Leone that would keep him away from the fields for six months.

On 19 July 2011, Hassan signed with Ahly's bitter rivals Zamalek a two-year contract as a free transfer after his contract with Ahly expired. On 20 September 2011, Hassan made his official debut with Zamalek in a cup match against Wadi Degla giving a phenomenal performance and scoring two goals and helping his team defeat Degla 4–1 and qualify to the next round. When the league was stopped in February due to the Port Said Stadium disaster, Hassan had played in all 15 games for Zamalek finishing as top scorer of the team with 7 goals. He then scored in a CAF Champions League match against Moroccan Maghreb Fez with a header in the 81st minute. On 16 January Hassan scored in a friendly against Ukrainian giants FC Shakhtar Donetsk.

== International career ==
Hassan has played in eight Africa Cup of Nations tournaments for Egypt, winning the tournament four times, in 1998, 2006, 2008 and 2010. In the 2006 tournament, he was named captain and scored four goals in six matches, the second-highest individual goal tally in that year's tournament. He was named best player of the tournament after winning his second title and Egypt's fifth, a feat he repeated in 2010 at the age of 34. In 2008, Hassan captained Egypt to their sixth Africa Cup of Nations victory. Ahmed Hassan is one of a number of players who have earned more than 100 international caps for Egypt, and is currently the third most capped male player for any country. He also holds the record for most Africa Cup of Nations won by any player in history.

Hassan broke Hossam Hassan's appearance record with his 170th cap for Egypt on 25 January 2010 in the Africa Cup of Nations quarter final against Cameroon. He had an eventful game: he headed an Achille Emaná corner into his own net (though Emana was credited with the goal); equalized from long range and claimed the final goal in a 3–1 win in extra time from a free-kick despite replays showing the ball did not cross the line. On 31 January 2010, Hassan picked up his fourth Africa Cup of Nations winners's medal as Egypt defeated Ghana 1–0 in the final. In November 2011, Hassan played his 178th game for Egypt in a friendly against Brazil. In doing so he matched the record for international appearances. On 27 March 2012, Hassan started a friendly match against Kenya earning 184 international appearances.

== Personal life ==
Hassan was selected as an ambassador for the Holland–Belgium 2018 or 2022 World Cup bid along with Ruud Gullit. Hassan was the honorary president of the 2015 edition of the SATUC Football Cup, an international football competition for refugees and orphans.

== Career statistics ==
=== International ===
Appearances and goals by national team and year
National team	Year	Apps	Goals
Egypt	1995	1	0
Egypt	1996	7	1
Egypt	1997	15	2
Egypt	1998	13	1
Egypt	1999	12	1
Egypt	2000	14	0
Egypt	2001	18	2
Egypt	2002	8	0
Egypt	2003	8	3
Egypt	2004	10	4
Egypt	2005	8	2
Egypt	2006	13	5
Egypt	2007	8	1
Egypt	2008	17	3
Egypt	2009	15	3
Egypt	2010	10	4
Egypt	2011	3	0
Egypt	2012	6	1
Total		184	33

Scores and results list Egypt's goal tally first, score column indicates score after each Hassan goal.

List of international goals scored by Ahmed Hassan
No.	Date	Venue	Opponent	Score	Result	Competition
1	8 November 1996	Cairo International Stadium, Cairo, Egypt	Namibia	2–0	7–1	1998 FIFA World Cup qualification
2	27 July 1997	Alexandria Stadium, Alexandria, Egypt	Ethiopia	7–1	8–1	1998 African Cup of Nations qualification
3	18 December 1997	Aswan Stadium, Aswan, Egypt	Togo	2–0	7–2	Friendly
4	28 February 1998	Stade du 4 Août, Ouagadougou, Burkina Faso	South Africa	1–0	2–0	1998 Africa Cup of Nations
5	27 July 1999	Estadio Azteca, Mexico City, Mexico	Mexico	1–2	2–2	1999 FIFA Confederations Cup
6	14 January 2001	Cairo International Stadium, Cairo, Egypt	Libya	2–0	4–0	2002 Africa Cup of Nations qualification
7	14 January 2001	Cairo International Stadium, Cairo, Egypt	Libya	3–0	4–0	2002 Africa Cup of Nations qualification
8	12 February 2003	Cairo International Stadium, Cairo, Egypt	Denmark	1–0	1–4	Friendly
9	8 June 2003	Port Said Stadium, Port Said, Egypt	Mauritius	6–0	7–0	2004 Africa Cup of Nations qualification
10	8 June 2003	Port Said Stadium, Port Said, Egypt	Mauritius	7–0	7–0	2004 Africa Cup of Nations qualification
11	8 January 2004	Port Said Stadium, Port Said, Egypt	Rwanda	4–0	5–1	Friendly
12	8 January 2004	Port Said Stadium, Port Said, Egypt	Rwanda	5–0	5–1	Friendly
13	4 July 2004	Stade de l'Amitié, Cotonou, Benin	Benin	1–2	3–3	2006 FIFA World Cup qualification
14	5 September 2004	Arab Contractors Stadium, Cairo, Egypt	Cameroon	2–0	3–2	2006 FIFA World Cup qualification
15	27 March 2005	Arab Contractors Stadium, Cairo, Egypt	Libya	3–1	4–1	2006 FIFA World Cup qualification
16	27 May 2005	Al-Sadaqua Walsalam Stadium, Kuwait City, Kuwait	Kuwait	1–0	1–0	Friendly
17	20 January 2006	Cairo International Stadium, Cairo, Egypt	Libya	3–0	3–0	2006 Africa Cup of Nations
18	3 February 2006	Cairo International Stadium, Cairo, Egypt	DR Congo	1–0	4–1	2006 Africa Cup of Nations
19	3 February 2006	Cairo International Stadium, Cairo, Egypt	DR Congo	4–1	4–1	2006 Africa Cup of Nations
20	7 February 2006	Cairo International Stadium, Cairo, Egypt	Senegal	1–0	2–1	2006 Africa Cup of Nations
21	2 September 2006	Cairo International Stadium, Cairo, Egypt	Burundi	4–0	4–1	2008 Africa Cup of Nations qualification
22	3 June 2007	Stade Olympique, Nouakchott, Mauritania	Mauritania	1–1	1–1	2008 Africa Cup of Nations qualification
23	5 January 2008	Aswan Stadium, Aswan, Egypt	Namibia	2–0	3–0	Friendly
24	6 June 2008	El Hadj Hassan Gouled Aptidon Stadium, Djibouti, Djibouti	Djibouti	3–0	4–0	2010 FIFA World Cup qualification
25	12 October 2008	Cairo Military Academy Stadium, Cairo, Egypt	Djibouti	2–0	4–0	2010 FIFA World Cup qualification
26	23 January 2009	Cairo International Stadium, Cairo, Egypt	Kenya	1–0	1–0	Friendly
27	5 September 2009	Amahoro Stadium, Kigali, Rwanda	Rwanda	1–0	1–0	2010 FIFA World Cup qualification
28	2 October 2009	Petro Sport Stadium, New Cairo, Egypt	Mauritius	2–0	4–0	Friendly
29	12 January 2010	Estádio Nacional de Ombaka, Benguela, Angola	Nigeria	3–1	3–1	2010 Africa Cup of Nations
30	25 January 2010	Estádio Nacional de Ombaka, Benguela, Angola	Cameroon	2–1	3–1	2010 Africa Cup of Nations
31	25 January 2010	Estádio Nacional de Ombaka, Benguela, Angola	Cameroon	3–1	3–1	2010 Africa Cup of Nations
32	11 August 2010	Cairo International Stadium, Cairo, Egypt	DR Congo	5–1	6–3	Friendly
33	27 February 2012	Thani bin Jassim Stadium, Al Rayyan, Qatar	Kenya	2–0	5–0	Friendly

== Honours ==
Aswan SC

- Egyptian Second Division A (Group I): 1995-96

Ismaily

- Egypt Cup: 1997

Beşiktaş

- Türkiye Kupası: 2005–06

Anderlecht

- Belgian First Division: 2006–07
- Belgian Cup: 2007–08
- Belgian Super Cup: 2006, 2007

Al Ahly

- Egyptian Premier League: 2008–09, 2009–10, 2010–11
- Egyptian Super Cup: 2008, 2010
- CAF Champions League: 2008
- African Super Cup: 2009

Zamalek

- Egypt Cup: 2013

Egypt

- African Cup of Nations: 1998, 2006, 2008, 2010

Individual

- Africa Cup of Nations Best Player: 2006, 2010
- African Inter-Club Player of the Year: 2010
- Africa Cup of Nations Dream Team: 2006, 2010

== See also ==
- List of men's footballers with 100 or more international caps
