= Nouhoum Kobéna =

Beninese footballer (born 1985)

Personal information
- Full name: Nouihoum Kobenan
- Date of birth: 5 January 1985 (age 41)
- Place of birth: Parakou, Benin
- Height: 1.84 m (6 ft 1/2 in)
- Position: Midfielder

Team information
- Current team: KTP

Youth career
- 2001–2003: Energie FC

Senior career*
Years	Team	Apps	(Gls)
2004	Energie FC	28	(2)
2005–2007	AS Bamako	53	(16)
2008–2009	Djoliba AC	?	(?)
2009–2012	Al Medina Tripoli	?	(?)
2012–2014	KTP	68	(14)

International career^{‡}
2006–	Benin	19	(1)
- * Club domestic league appearances and goals ‡ National team caps and goals as of 28 January 2014

Nouihoum Kobenan (born 5 January 1985 in Parakou) is a Beninese retired football player who last played for Kotkan Työväen Palloilijat in Finland.

== Career ==
He began his career with Energie FC and signed in 2005 with Malien Premiere Division club AS Bamako, he won with the team also in his first season the Malien Cup. After two years with AS Bamako joined in Winter 2007 to League and city rival Djoliba AC, here won in his first season the league Malien Première Division.

In 2012, he moved to Finnish club Kotkan Työväen Palloilijat.

== International ==
Koubena began his career for his homeland Benin in 2006.

== Honours ==
- 2005: Malien Cup
- 2008: Malien Première Division
