= Almiro Lobo =

Mozambican footballer (born 1982)

Miró
Personal information
- Full name: Almiro Edson Daniel Lobo
- Date of birth: 30 April 1982 (age 44)
- Place of birth: Quelimane, Mozambique
- Height: 1.72 m (5 ft 8 in)
- Position: Left back

Senior career*
Years	Team	Apps	(Gls)
2003–2004	Maxaquene		
2004–2006	Budapest Honvéd	28	(5)
2006–2007	Dunaújváros FC	7	(3)
2006–2008	Bidvest Wits	36	(0)
2008–2012	Platinum Stars	60	(1)
2012–2014	Liga Muçulmana		
2014–2020	Bravos do Maquis	107	(2)
2016	→ AS Aviação (loan)	16	(1)

International career^{‡}
2004–2015	Mozambique	79	(8)
- * Club domestic league appearances and goals as of 15 January 2010 ‡ National team caps and goals as of 14 November 2015

Almiro Edson Daniel Lobo, better known as Miró (born 30 April 1982 in Quelimane) is a Mozambican football defender who currently plays for South African Premier Soccer League club Platinum Stars and Mozambique.

== International career ==
=== International goals ===
Scores and results list Mozambique's goal tally first.

No	Date	Venue	Opponent	Score	Result	Competition
1.	8 June 2008	Estádio da Machava, Maputo, Mozambique	Botswana	1–1	1–2	2010 FIFA World Cup qualification
2.	7 September 2008	Estádio da Machava, Maputo, Mozambique	Ivory Coast	1–1	1–1	2010 FIFA World Cup qualification
3.	12 August 2009	Estádio da Machava, Maputo, Mozambique	Swaziland	1–0	1–0	Friendly
4.	12 January 2010	Estádio Nacional de Ombaka, Benguela, Angola	Benin	1–2	2–2	2010 Africa Cup of Nations
5.	11 August 2010	Estádio da Machava, Maputo, Mozambique	Swaziland	2–1	2–1	Friendly
6.	11 November 2011	Stade Said Mohamed Cheikh, Mitsamiouli, Comoros	Comoros	1–0	1–0	2014 FIFA World Cup qualification
7.	9 September 2012	Estádio do Zimpeto, Maputo, Mozambique	Morocco	1–0	2–0	2013 Africa Cup of Nations qualification
8.	28 July 2013	Estádio da Machava, Maputo, Mozambique	Namibia	1–0	3–0	2014 African Nations Championship qualification
