= Thomas Nyirenda =

Zambian footballer (born 1986)

Personal information
- Full name: Thomas Nyirenda
- Date of birth: February 28, 1986 (age 40)
- Place of birth: Chililabombwe, Zambia
- Height: 1.83 m (6 ft 0 in)
- Positions: Defender; defensive midfielder

Team information
- Current team: Konkola Blades

Senior career*
Years	Team	Apps	(Gls)
2006–2008	Konkola Blades		
2009–2010	Zanaco FC		
2011	Konkola Blades		
2012–2015	Power Dynamos		
2015–2019	Ferroviário da Beira		
2020–2021	UD Songo		
2022–	Konkola Blades		

International career
2009–2013	Zambia	26	(0)
- * Club domestic league appearances and goals as of January 26, 2010

Thomas Nyirenda (born January 28, 1986, in Zambia) is a Zambian football player who currently plays for Konkola Blades and for the Zambia national football team as a defender.

== International career ==
He made his debut for the national side in 2009, playing for Zambia at the 2010 Africa Cup of Nations. He was the only player to miss from the spot in the quarter-final penalty shootout between his team and Nigeria, as Zambia lost the game and the qualification for the semi-finals.
