= Carlos Fumo =

Mozambican footballer

Personal information
- Full name: Carlos Fumo Gonçalves
- Date of birth: 22 September 1979 (age 47)
- Place of birth: Maputo, Mozambique
- Height: 1.77 m (5 ft 10 in)
- Position: Winger

Senior career*
Years	Team	Apps	(Gls)
1999–2003	Sporting CP	0	(0)
2000–2001	→ Maia (loan)	29	(7)
2001–2002	→ Varzim (loan)	7	(1)
2002–2003	→ Farense (loan)	25	(2)
2003–2004	Naval	19	(3)
2005	Alverca	5	(0)
2005–2006	Gondomar	32	(14)
2006–2007	Gil Vicente	18	(1)
2007–2008	Olhanense	22	(1)
2008	Atromitos	14	(1)
2009	APEP	13	(4)
2009–2010	Olympiakos Nicosia	16	(4)
2010–2011	Akritas Chlorakas	9	(1)
2013	Matchedje Maputo		
2013	Têxtil Punguè		
Total		209	(39)

International career
1998–2011	Mozambique	27	(2)
- * Club domestic league appearances and goals

Carlos Fumo Gonçalves (born 22 September 1979 in Maputo) is a Mozambican retired footballer who played as a left winger.
