= Hosny Abd Rabo =

Egyptian footballer (born 1984)

Personal information
- Full name: Hosni Abd Rabbo Abdul Muttalib Ibrahim
- Date of birth: 1 November 1984 (age 41)
- Place of birth: Ismailia, Egypt
- Height: 1.75 m (5 ft 9 in)
- Position: Central midfielder

Youth career
- 1996–2002: Ismaily

Senior career*
| Years | Team | Apps | (Gls) |
| 2002–2005 | Ismaily | 14 | (5) |
| 2005–2007 | Strasbourg | 22 | (0) |
| 2006–2007 | → Ismaily (loan) | 28 | (9) |
| 2007–2019 | Ismaily | 173 | (45) |
| 2008–2010 | → Al Ahli Dubai (loan) | 29 | (5) |
| 2012–2012 | → Al Ittihad (loan) | 5 | (1) |
| 2012–2013 | → Al Nassr (loan) | 7 | (1) |
| Total | | 260 | (66) |

International career
| 2004–2014 | Egypt | 102 | (16) |
Medal record
Men's football
Representing Egypt
Africa Cup of Nations
| Winner | 2008 Ghana |
| Winner | 2010 Angola |
- * Club domestic league appearances and goals

Hosni Abd Rabbo Abdul Muttalib Ibrahim (Arabic: حسني عبد ربه عبد المطلب إبراهيم; born 1 November 1984) is an Egyptian football manager and a former professional footballer who played as a central or defensive midfielder

Hosny was usually deployed as a deep-lying playmaker in the midfield for both his club and national sides.

Hosny spent most of his career at his boyhood club Ismaily where he played with the first team for more than 15 seasons. He is also one of the few players to refuse to leave the club to join their rivals Al Ahly.

Hosny also represented the Egypt national team at both youth and senior levels. He was a member of the winning squad of the 2008 and 2010 Africa Cup of Nations and won the Player of the Tournament award in 2008. Hosny was also included in Egypt's 2009 FIFA Confederations Cup squad and played all of his nation's matches during the tournament.

On 16 January 2019, Hosny officially announced his retirement from football at the age of 34.

== Club career ==
=== Ismaily ===
Hosny started his professional football career at Ismaily in Egypt, and was the youngest player in the Egyptian first division when Ismaily won the League Championship in the season 2001–02. In 2003, Hosni joined the Egyptian U-20's in the FIFA World Youth Championship 2003 in the Arab Emirates.

At the end of 2003, he played in the Arabian Club Championship final but lost, achieving the same result in the 2003 African Champions League. In 2004 Hosny was selected for the first time in his career to play for the Egyptian national team in the 2004 African Cup of Nations in Tunisia and was one of the youngest players in the tournament.

He re-joined Ismaily in January 2011.

=== Strasbourg ===
In summer 2005, Hosny signed a five-year contract with French club RC Strasbourg, for whom he appeared in 22 Ligue 1 matches. He was called up for the Egyptian national team that would participate in the 2006 African Cup of Nations in Egypt, but was injured just one week before the tournament started and could not play. The Egyptian national team eventually went on to win the tournament against Ivory Coast.

=== Return to Ismaily ===
In the 2005–06 season, Strasbourg was relegated to Ligue 2. Hosny then left the team on a season loan deal, returning to his original club Ismaily.

Due to his impressive performance with the Egyptian national team in the 2008 African Cup of Nations tournament, he was chosen as Player of the Tournament.

After the loan spell ended, Hosny agreed to extend his stay at Ismaily on a permanent deal due to Strasbourg's failure to achieve promotion to Ligue 1. However, this move did not receive consent from Strasbourg and they decided to sue the player for signing a contract with another club without their consent.

=== Al-Ahli ===
On 29 July 2008, it was announced that Hosny had signed a loan deal for two seasons for Emirati club Al-Ahli in Dubai, despite the player having been linked with offers from top European clubs in England and Spain. Ismaily later revealed that the only official offer they received, other than Al-Ahli's offer, was from Spanish club Osasuna.

Immediately after the player's move was made public, officials of the Egyptian Premier League club Al Ahly announced that they intend to sue Hosny for moving to Ahli Dubai, despite having earlier signed a contract for them.

=== Al Nassr FC ===
On 2 July 2012, Hosny signed a one-year loan deal with Saudi club Al Nassr FC.

== International career ==
Hosny made his debut for the Egypt national team against Sudan on 6 June 2004. He was called up to the Egyptian national team for the 2006 African Cup of Nations held in Egypt, but was injured one week before the tournament started and was consequently excluded from the tournament squad. As a member of the national team, he won the 2007 Pan Arab Games held in Egypt. He was the key player in the Egyptian team that won the 2008 African Cup of Nations, scoring four goals, making two assists and being named Player of the Tournament.

=== 2008 African Cup of Nations ===
Hosny scored two goals in the first match against Cameroon, one from a penalty. Hosny also assisted the third goal, which was scored by Abo Trieka.

== Career statistics ==
Appearances and goals by national team and year
| National team | Year | Apps | Goals |
|---|---|---|---|
| Egypt | 2004 | 8 | 0 |
| Egypt | 2005 | 12 | 0 |
| Egypt | 2006 | 4 | 1 |
| Egypt | 2007 | 10 | 0 |
| Egypt | 2008 | 18 | 7 |
| Egypt | 2009 | 13 | 5 |
| Egypt | 2010 | 8 | 1 |
| Egypt | 2011 | 8 | 0 |
| Egypt | 2012 | 10 | 1 |
| Egypt | 2013 | 6 | 1 |
| Egypt | 2014 | 4 | 0 |
| Total | | 101 | 16 |

Scores and results list Egypt's goal tally first, score column indicates score after each Hosny goal.

List of international goals scored by Hosny Abd Rabo
| No. | Date | Venue | Opponent | Score | Result | Competition |
|---|---|---|---|---|---|---|
| 1 | 2 September 2006 | Cairo International Stadium, Cairo, Egypt | Burundi | 2–0 | 4–1 | 2008 Africa Cup of Nations qualification |
| 2 | 10 January 2008 | Al-Nahyan Stadium, Abu Dhabi, United Arab Emirates | Mali | 1–0 | 1–0 | Friendly |
| 3 | 22 January 2008 | Baba Yara Stadium, Kumasi, Ghana | Cameroon | 1–0 | 4–2 | 2008 Africa Cup of Nations |
| 4 | 22 January 2008 | Baba Yara Stadium, Kumasi, Ghana | Cameroon | 4–1 | 4–2 | 2008 Africa Cup of Nations |
| 5 | 26 January 2008 | Baba Yara Stadium, Kumasi, Ghana | Sudan | 1–0 | 3–0 | 2008 Africa Cup of Nations |
| 6 | 4 February 2008 | Baba Yara Stadium, Kumasi, Ghana | Angola | 1–0 | 2–1 | 2008 Africa Cup of Nations |
| 7 | 6 June 2008 | Stade du Ville, Djibouti, Djibouti | Djibouti | 2–0 | 4–0 | 2010 FIFA World Cup qualification |
| 8 | 19 November 2008 | Cairo International Stadium, Cairo, Egypt | Benin | 1–0 | 5–1 | Friendly |
| 9 | 5 July 2009 | Military Academy Stadium, Cairo, Egypt | Rwanda | 2–0 | 3–0 | 2010 FIFA World Cup qualification |
| 10 | 12 August 2009 | Cairo International Stadium, Cairo, Egypt | Guinea | 1–0 | 3–3 | Friendly |
| 11 | 12 August 2009 | Cairo International Stadium, Cairo, Egypt | Guinea | 2–1 | 3–3 | Friendly |
| 12 | 10 October 2009 | Konkola Stadium, Chililabombwe, Zambia | Zambia | 1–0 | 1–0 | 2010 FIFA World Cup qualification |
| 13 | 29 December 2009 | Cairo International Stadium, Cairo, Egypt | Malawi | 1–0 | 1–1 | Friendly |
| 14 | 28 January 2010 | Estádio Nacional de Ombaka, Benguela, Angola | Algeria | 1–0 | 4–0 | 2010 Africa Cup of Nations |
| 15 | 29 February 2012 | Thani bin Jassim Stadium, Doha, Qatar | Niger | 1–0 | 1–0 | Friendly |
| 16 | 26 March 2013 | Borg El Arab Stadium, Alexandria, Egypt | Zimbabwe | 1–0 | 2–1 | 2014 FIFA World Cup qualification |

== Honours ==
Ismaily

- Egyptian Premier League: 2001–02

Al Ahli

- UAE Super Cup: 2008
- UAE Football League: 2008–09

Egypt U20

- African Youth Championship: Burkina Faso 2003
- Participated in World Youth Championship (8th place): 2003
- 11th Pan Arab Games: 2007

Egypt

- Africa Cup of Nations: 2008, 2010

Individual

- Player of the tournament in the ACN 2008 in Ghana.
- Chosen in the starting XI team of the tournament in the ACN 2008 tournament.
- Best player in CAN 2008.

== See also ==
- List of men's footballers with 100 or more international caps
