= Chinedu Obasi =

Nigerian footballer (born 1986)

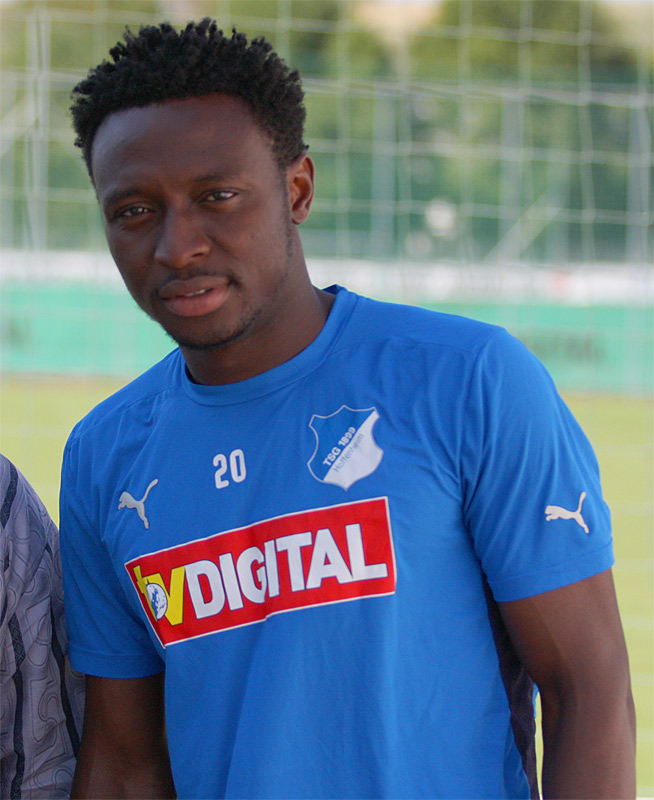
- Obasi in 2009

Personal information
- Full name: Chinedu Ogbuke Obasi
- Date of birth: 1 June 1986 (age 40)
- Place of birth: Enugu, Nigeria
- Height: 1.88 m (6 ft 2 in)
- Position: Forward

Youth career
- 1997–2002: River Lane Youth Club Enugu
- 2002–2004: Enugu Rangers
- 2004–2005: JC Raiders

Senior career*
Years	Team	Apps	(Gls)
2005–2007	Lyn	29	(14)
2007–2012	TSG 1899 Hoffenheim	92	(25)
2012	→ Schalke 04 (loan)	10	(1)
2012–2015	Schalke 04	25	(3)
2016	AIK	10	(6)
2017	Shenzhen FC	17	(5)
2017	AIK	9	(5)
2018	Bolton Wanderers	0	(0)
2018	IF Elfsborg	10	(4)
2019	AIK	18	(5)
2020–2021	SCR Altach	24	(2)

International career
2005	Nigeria U20	8	(3)
2005–2011	Nigeria	26	(4)
Medal record
Representing Nigeria
Men's Football
Silver medal – second place	FIFA World; Youth Championship	2005
Silver medal – second place	2008 Beijing	Team competition
Bronze medal – third place	Africa Cup of Nations	2010
- * Club domestic league appearances and goals

Chinedu Ogbuke Obasi (born 1 June 1986)// is a Nigerian former professional footballer who played as a forward.

== Club career ==
=== Lyn ===
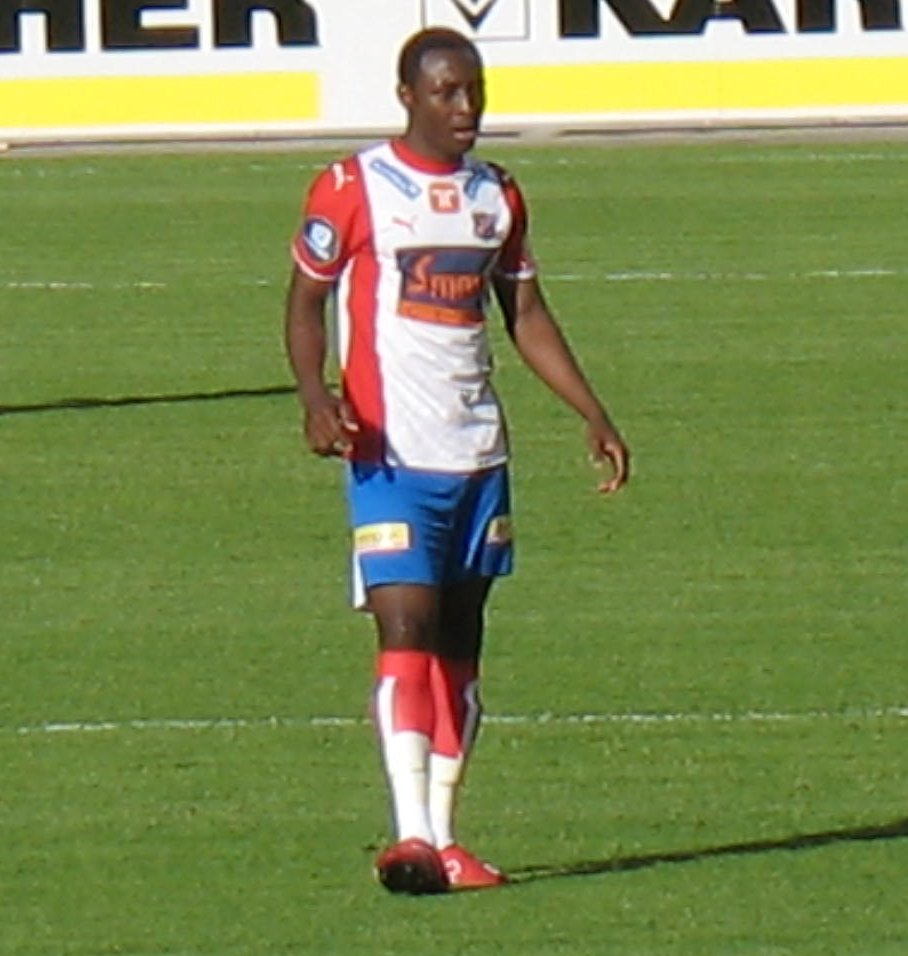
Obasi playing for Lyn.

Born in Enugu, Nigeria, Obasi started his football career at River Lane Youth Club Enugu and JC Raiders in his homeland country. Obasi went to Norway at the same time as his countryman Mikel John Obi; both players joined Lyn. It was disputed that Obasi signed for Lyn in 2004, but this was rejected by FIFA which ordered both Obasi and Ezekiel Bala returned to Lyn with immediate effect.

Obasi made his Lyn debut, in the opening game of the season, where he played 66 minutes, in a 1–1 draw against Fredrikstad. However, Obasi struggled to regain a place in the first team and it wasn't until on 25 September 2005 when he scored his first Lyn goal, in a 1–0 win over Brann. Despite this, Obasi made five appearances in his first season.

In the 2006 season, Obasi didn't play for the side at the start of the season due to an ongoing dispute with his own club. On 2 July 2006, he made his first appearance of the season in a 2–1 win over Fredrikstad. Obasi then scored his first goal for the club on 6 August 2006, in a 2–0 win over Molde, followed up by scoring twice in the next game, with a 3–2 loss against Stabæk. Despite suffering from injuries during the season, Obasi finished his second season making fifteen appearances and scoring eight times in all competitions. For his performance, Obasi was named Young Player of the Year.

On 20 December 2006, a transfer deal was announced with Russian side Lokomotiv Moscow, and Obasi was set to move to the Russian side in January. The deal was derailed, however, when the president, sporting director and manager of Lokomotiv were all fired six days later. Several days after he trained with Premier League side Portsmouth, Obasi signed a contract with Lyn, keeping him until 2008. By the time of his departure from Lyn, Obasi had made eleven appearances and five goals in all competitions.

Throughout his Lyn career, Obasi was linked with moves to European clubs, such as Wigan Athletic, Manchester United, Chelsea, Arsenal and Barcelona. Despite pleads from then Manager Henning Berg, the club expected to see Obasi leave the club in the summer, as German side 1899 Hoffenheim closed on signing him.

=== TSG 1899 Hoffenheim ===
On 27 August 2007, Obasi moved to 2. Bundesliga side Hoffenheim for an undisclosed fee.

Obasi quickly made an impact for Hoffenheim when he scored twice on his debut despite losing 3–2 against Freiburg. After missing the next game, Obasi returned to the first team, where he set up one of the goals, in a 2–0 win over Paderborn. After returning, Obasi continued to appear in the first team and scored five times in five months. In a match against Paderborn on 9 March 2008, which saw Hoffenheim win 1–0, Obasi was sent-off in the 54th minute when he was involved in an incident with opposition midfielder Erwin Koen. After the match, Obasi claimed that Koen racially abused him, which led to his sending off, a claim Koen denied and even thought about taking legal action against Obasi. In the end, the DFB's control committee decided against taking action against Koen, citing lack of evidence and Obasi served a three match suspension. Following his return from suspension, Obasi scored four more goals later in the season and helped the club reach promotion to Bundesliga for the first time. Obasi finished his first season at the club, making thirty appearances and scoring twelve times in all competitions. This made him the club's joint top-scorer in the league, along with Demba Ba.

Ahead of the 2008–09 season, Obasi was linked with a move to England, but eventually stayed at the club throughout the summer. However, at the start of the season, Obasi missed out several matches, due to injury and international commitment. Obasi made his first appearance of the season on 13 September 2008 against Stuttgart, where he played 30 minutes, in a 0–0 draw. Despite suffering from injury in training soon after, Obasi then scored his first goal of the season in a 5–2 win over Hannover 96 on 18 October 2008, followed up by scoring twice, in a 3–0 win over Hamburg in the next game. Throughout the 2008–09 season, Obasi suffered a setback when he was plagued by injuries. Nevertheless, Obasi finished the season, making twenty–six appearances and scoring six times in all competitions.

In the 2009–10 season, Obasi started well when he scored his first goal of the season, in a 2–0 win over Oberneuland in the first round of DFB-Pokal, followed up by scoring in a 1–1 draw against Bayern Munich in the opening game of the season. After being sidelined with an injury, Obasi scored on his return on 1 November 2009, in a 4–0 win over Köln. However, as the 2009–10 season progressed, Obasi was kept out from the first team, due to international commitment and injury. Eventually, he made his return to the first team and then scored twice on 25 April 2010, in a 5–1 win over Hamburg. He went on to finish the 2009–10 season, making twenty–six appearances and scoring eight times in all competitions.

However, at the start of the 2010–11 season, Obasi was sidelined for about eight weeks with a shin injury. It wasn't until on 17 October 2010, when Obasi returned to the first team, coming on as a late substitute, in a 3–2 win over Borussia Mönchengladbach. After appearing in three more matches, Obasi, once again, suffered a knee injury that kept him out for three months. After months on the sideline, Obasi returned to the first team in the last game of the season, as a late substitute, in a 3–1 loss against Wolfsburg. Following this, Obasi went on to make six appearances in all competitions.

In the 2011–12 season, Obasi regained his first team place at Hoffenheim following his injury plagued last season. In a match against Stuttgart, which saw them lose 2–0 on 18 October 2011, Obasi was substituted in the second half and when he left the pitch, he refused to shake Holger Stanislawski's hand and was fined as a result. Seven days later, on 25 October 2011, Obasi scored his first goal of the season, in the second round of DFB-Pokal, in a 2–1 win over Köln. Obasi continued to remain in the first team for the club until he was dropped from the squad ahead of a match against Hamburg for disobeying orders and a week later when he was late for training. Following this, Obasi announced his desire to leave the club, when his first team opportunities became more limited.

=== Schalke 04 ===
On 23 December 2011, it was confirmed that Obasi was going on loan to Schalke 04 until the end of the 2011–12 season. Prior to a match against his former club, Hoffenheim, Obasi said that the club would remain in his heart and that he considered it as his second home.

Obasi made his Schalke 04 debut when he played for 75 minutes in a 3–1 win over Stuttgart on 21 January 2012. Two weeks later, on 4 February 2012, Obasi scored his first goal for the club, in a 1–1 draw against Mainz 05. As the season progressed, Obasi continued to remain in the first team despite being sidelined with injuries. At the end of the 2011–12 season, Obasi made ten appearances and scored once for the side whilst on loan.

On 2 July 2012, Schalke 04 confirmed that Obasi signed a three-year professional contract with them until 30 June 2015. The transfer fee was reported as €4,000,000 to €5,000,000 by Schalke's sport and communications manager Horst Heldt. Obasi was assigned a number 19 shirt. However, at the start of the season, Obasi suffered a setback when he continued to recover from his injury. After returning to training, Obasi then made his first appearance since joining them on a permanent basis in a 2–2 draw against Fortuna Düsseldorf on 28 September 2012. However, Obasi continued to be plagued by injuries and was on the substitute bench for most of the season. At the end of the 2012–13 season, Obasi had made only seven appearances for the club.

In the 2013–14 season, Obasi continued to recover from injury at the start of the season. After returning to training around November, Obasi did not make a return to the first team until the following month, where he played 20 minutes, in a 0–0 draw against Nürnberg. Despite suffering from another injury, Obasi scored his first goal in two years in a 4–0 against his former club, Hoffenheim, on 8 March 2014. After the match, Obasi said scoring a goal motivated him after missing out a long time. At the end of the 2013–14 season, Obasi had made nineteen appearances and scored three times in all competitions.

Ahead of the 2014–15 season, Obasi was then reassigned a number 20 shirt for his last season with Schalke 04. He remained in the first team at the start of the season and then scored his first goal of the season, in a European match, in a 4–3 win over Sporting Lisbon on 21 October 2014. There were hints of getting a new contract, but Obasi suffered a shinbone injury that kept him out for the rest of the season. At the end of the 2014–15 season, Obasi was released by the club after his contract expired and had made ten appearances and one goal in all competitions.

=== First spell at AIK ===
On 23 October 2015, Obasi was handed a trial by Premier League side Sunderland. However, the club decided against signing him following the trial, citing his fitness concerns. Afterwards, Obasi went on trial at Eintracht Frankfurt. The club eventually decided against signing Obasi over his fitness concerns.

On 4 August 2016, Obasi signed a short-term contract with AIK Three days later, on 7 August 2016, Obasi made his AIK debut, where he started and played the whole game, in a 2–0 loss against Malmö. Two weeks later, on 21 August 2016, Obasi scored his first goal for the club, in a 2–0 win over Örebro.

After making ten appearances and scoring six times, Obasi helped the club finish in second place in the league and for his performance, Obasi was offered a new contract by the club when his contract expired at the end of the season. However, a month later, Obasi rejected a new contract from AIK in favour of a move to China.

=== Shenzhen FC ===
At the end of the season, Obasi moved abroad again when he was recruited by China League One Shenzhen FC on 4 February 2017, signing a one-year contract and joining manager Sven-Göran Eriksson.

=== Second spell at AIK ===
On 26 July 2017, AIK announced they had signed Obasi. He joined the squad on 1 August and was under contract the remainder of the 2017 season.

=== Bolton Wanderers ===
On 3 March 2018, Obasi moved to English club Bolton Wanderers following a successful trial spell. On 24 May 2018, Bolton confirmed that Obasi would leave the club on 30 June when his contract came to an end. He played no matches for Bolton due to lacking match fitness, never becoming fit enough to play for the team.

=== Elfsborg ===
On 12 August 2018, Obasi signed with IF Elfsborg in Allsvenskan, Sweden's first tier, for the remainder of the season.

=== Third spell at AIK ===
On 21 January 2019 it was announced that Obasi had signed a one-year deal with AIK, his third spell at the Stockholm club.

== International career ==
=== Norway naturalization persuasion ===
Obasi was offered the chance to represent the Norway national football team during his club career in Norway and Obasi stated that: "I don't regret dumping Norway to play for Nigeria, back then at Lyn Oslo with Mikel John Obi, I was encouraged to naturalize to receive a Norwegian passport and become a Norwegian, the Football Association of Norway wanted me to play for the Norway national football team at that time and I must confess I gave it a thought for a long time, I had already played for Nigeria in one of their friendly matches which was one of the deciding factors in my final choice, I love Nigeria and I was well received by the senior players in Super Eagles, I had to walk up to them in Norway's Football Association of Norway and say no".

=== Nigeria ===
Obasi was part of the Nigeria national under-20 football team that finished runners-up at the 2005 FIFA World Youth Championship.

After the end of the FIFA World Youth Championship, Obasi was called up by the senior national team for the first time on 17 August 2005, in a 1–0 defeat against Libya. In July 2008, Obasi was called up by Nigeria national under-23 football team. However, the club refused to let Obasi go to the Olympics, leading him to take the situation to FIFA. Eventually, Obasi was given permission by the club's management to compete with the national olympic team and helped the side finish runners-up at the 2008 Beijing Summer Olympics. During the tournament, Obasi scored twice on 19 August 2008, in a 4–1 win over Belgium.

In January 2010, Obasi was called up by the Nigeria for the Africa Cup of Nations. In the group stage, Obasi scored the opener in the 12th minute, but lost 3–1 against Egypt. Later in the tournament, Obasi helped the national team finish in third-place at the 2010 Africa Cup of Nations after beating Algeria.

Six months later, Obasi was included in the 23-man squad for the national team in the 2010 FIFA World Cup. On matchday one, Obasi made his World Cup debut when he made his first start and played 60 minutes in a 1–0 against Argentina. On matchday three, Obasi set up a goal for Yakubu to score an equaliser, in a 2–2 draw against South Korea, but this was not enough for his side to progress out of the group stages.

A year later, Obasi scored his fourth international goal for the side, in a 3–1 loss against Argentina.

Since 2011, Obasi hasn't played for the national team, due to injury and being out of form and because he was not released by the club although he was called up on more than one occasion.

== Personal life ==
The name "Obasi" means "Glory of God" in the Nigerian Igbo language. Obasi prays before every one of his matches: "I can talk to God about everything, so I pray for victory".

When Obasi lived in Germany, he began to learn the German language. It was reported that Obasi received a German citizenship in March 2015, having stayed there for eight years.

== Career statistics ==
=== Club ===
Appearances and goals by club, season and competition
Club	Season	League			Cup		Continental		Total	
Club	Season	Division	Apps	Goals	Apps	Goals	Apps	Goals	Apps	Goals
Lyn	2005	Tippeligaen	5	1	0	0	—		5	1
Lyn	2006	Tippeligaen	13	8	0	0	2	0	15	8
Lyn	2007	Tippeligaen	11	5	0	0	—		11	5
Lyn	Total		29	14	0	0	2	0	31	14
1899 Hoffenheim	2007–08	2. Bundesliga	27	12	3	0	—		30	12
1899 Hoffenheim	2008–09	Bundesliga	24	6	1	0	—		24	6
1899 Hoffenheim	2009–10	Bundesliga	23	7	3	1	—		26	8
1899 Hoffenheim	2010–11	Bundesliga	5	0	1	0	—		6	0
1899 Hoffenheim	2011–12	Bundesliga	13	0	2	1	—		15	1
1899 Hoffenheim	Total		92	25	10	2	—		102	27
Schalke 04	2011–12	Bundesliga	10	1	0	0	5	0	15	1
Schalke 04	2012–13	Bundesliga	4	0	1	0	2	0	7	0
Schalke 04	2013–14	Bundesliga	15	3	1	0	3	0	19	3
Schalke 04	2014–15	Bundesliga	6	0	0	0	4	1	10	1
Schalke 04	Total		25	3	2	0	9	1	36	4
AIK	2016	Allsvenskan	10	6	0	0	—		10	6
Shenzhen FC	2017	China League One	17	5	0	0	—		17	5
AIK	2017	Allsvenskan	9	5	0	0	1	1	10	6
Bolton Wanderers	2017–18	Championship	0	0	0	0	—		0	0
Elfsborg	2018	Allsvenskan	10	4	0	0	—		10	4
AIK	2019	Allsvenskan	18	5	3	2	6	1	27	8
SCR Altach	2020–21	Austrian Bundesliga	24	2	3	4	—		27	5
Career total			244	70	18	8	23	3	285	81

=== International ===
Appearances and goals by national team and year
National team	Year	Apps	Goals
Nigeria	2005	1	0
Nigeria	2006	2	0
Nigeria	2007	0	0
Nigeria	2008	6	0
Nigeria	2009	1	0
Nigeria	2010	11	1
Nigeria	2011	5	1
Total		26	2

Scores and results list Nigeria's goal tally first, score column indicates score after each Obasi goal.

List of international goals scored by Chinedu Obasi
No.	Date	Venue	Opponent	Score	Result	Competition
1	12 January 2010	Ombaka National Stadium, Benguela, Angola	Egypt	1–0	1–3	2010 Africa Cup of Nations
2	6 September 2011	Bangabandhu National Stadium, Dhaka, Bangladesh	Argentina	1–2	1–3	Friendly

== Honours ==
Nigeria

- African Nations Cup bronze medal: 2010

Nigeria Olympic

- Olympic Games silver medal: 2008

Nigeria U20

- FIFA World Youth Championship runner-up: 2005

Individual

- Norwegian Premier League player of the month: August 2006
- Kniksen award: Young player of the year in 2006
