= Sayed Moawad =

Egyptian footballer (born 1979)

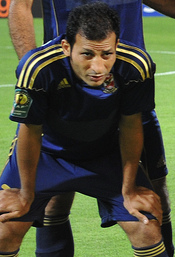
- Moawad lining up for Al Ahly in 2011

Personal information
- Full name: Sayed Moawad Mohamed Abdelwahed
- Date of birth: 25 May 1979 (age 47)
- Place of birth: Faiyum, Egypt
- Height: 1.68 m (5 ft 6 in)
- Position: Left-back

Senior career*
Years	Team	Apps	(Gls)
1999–2000	Al-Aluminium		
2000–2008	Al-Ismaily	92	(2)
2008	→ Trabzonspor (loan)	4	(0)
2008–2014	Al Ahly	85	(1)

International career
2000–2013	Egypt	79	(2)
- * Club domestic league appearances and goals

Sayed Moawad Mohamed Abdelwahed (Arabic: سيد معوض عبد الواحد محمد; born 25 May 1979) is an Egyptian retired professional footballer who played as a left-back.

Moawad represented Al Ahly in the FIFA Club World Cup three times in 2008, 2012 and 2014. He had a four-month spell with Trabzonspor in the Turkish Super Lig during 2008.

Moawad made his international debut on 25 August 2000 in a friendly match against Kenya. He was a member of the Egypt national football team that won the 2008 and 2010 Africa Cup of Nations. He also represented Egypt at the 2009 FIFA Confederations Cup.

== Personal life ==
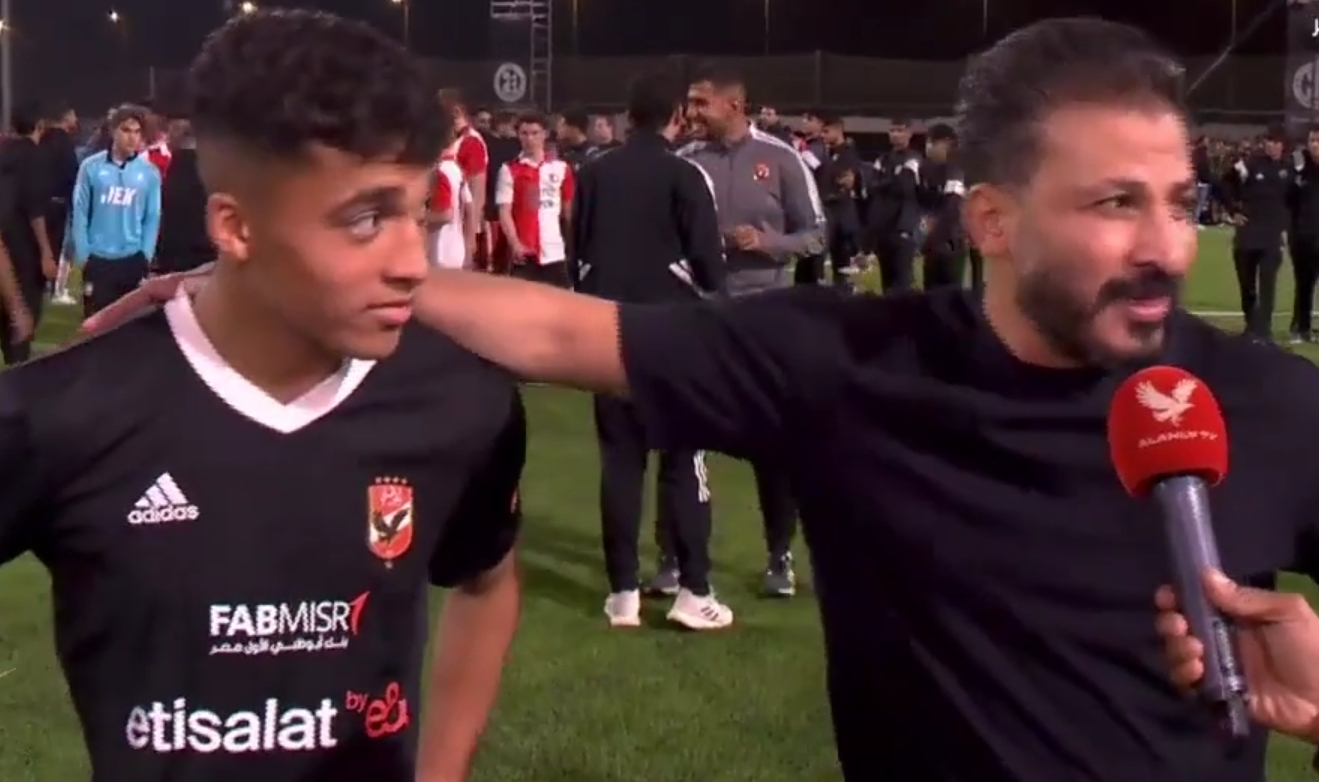
Sayed Moawad with his son Omar

Sayed is the father of Real Betis winger Omar Moawad.
