= 2010 Africa Cup of Nations =

27th edition of the Africa Cup of Nations

Campeonato Africano das Nações de 2010 (Angolan Portuguese)
- Official logo

Tournament details
- Host country: Angola
- Dates: 10–31 January
- Teams: 16
- Venues: 4 (in 4 host cities)

Final positions
- Champions: Egypt (7th title)
- Runners-up: Ghana
- Third place: Nigeria
- Fourth place: Algeria

Tournament statistics
- Matches played: 29
- Goals scored: 71 (2.45 per match)
- Attendance: 543,500 (18,741 per match)
- Top scorer: (Egypt) Gedo (5 goals)
- Best player: (Egypt) Ahmed Hassan
- Best goalkeeper: (Egypt) Essam El Hadary

The 2010 Africa Cup of Nations, also known as the Orange Africa Cup of Nations for sponsorship reasons, was the 27th Africa Cup of Nations, the biennial football championship of Africa (CAF). It was held in Angola, from 10 January to 31 January 2010.

In the tournament, the hosts Angola were to be joined by 15 nations who advanced from the qualification process that began in October 2007 and involved 53 African national teams. The withdrawal of Togo two days before the tournament began, after a terrorist attack on their bus upon arriving in Angola, reduced the number of participating nations to 15. A total of 29 games were played, instead of the scheduled 32 because of the reduced teams. Egypt won the tournament, their seventh ACN title and an unprecedented third in a row, beating Ghana 1–0 in the final.

== Host selection ==
Bids:

- Angola (selected as hosts for 2010)
- Gabon / Equatorial Guinea (selected as hosts for 2012)
- Libya (selected as hosts for 2013)
- Nigeria (selected as reserve hosts for 2010, 2012 & 2013 tournaments)

Rejected Bids :

- Benin / Central African Republic
- Botswana
- Mozambique
- Namibia
- Senegal
- Zimbabwe

On 4 September 2006, the Confederation of African Football (CAF) approved a compromise between rival countries to host the Africa Cup of Nations after it ruled out Nigeria. CAF agreed to award the next three editions from 2010 to Angola, Equatorial Guinea, Gabon and Libya respectively. They assigned Angola in 2010, Equatorial Guinea and Gabon, which submitted a joint bid in 2012, and Libya for 2014.

This edition was awarded to Angola to encourage the country to move towards peace after the Angolan Civil War.

Two-time former host Nigeria was the reserve host for the 2010, 2012 and 2014 tournaments, in the event that any of the host countries failed to meet the requirements established by CAF, although this ended up being unnecessary.

The 2014 tournament was pushed forward to 2013 and subsequently held in odd-numbered years to avoid year-clash with the FIFA World Cup.

== Qualification ==
The Confederation of African Football announced that the 2010 FIFA World Cup qualification would also be the qualification for this tournament. Despite the fact Angola were the host of the 2010 Africa Cup of Nations, they also needed to participate in the 2010 FIFA World Cup qualification. South Africa suffered the same situation, being the hosts for the World Cup but still needing to compete in qualification in order to qualify for the 2010 Africa Cup of Nations.

=== Qualified teams ===
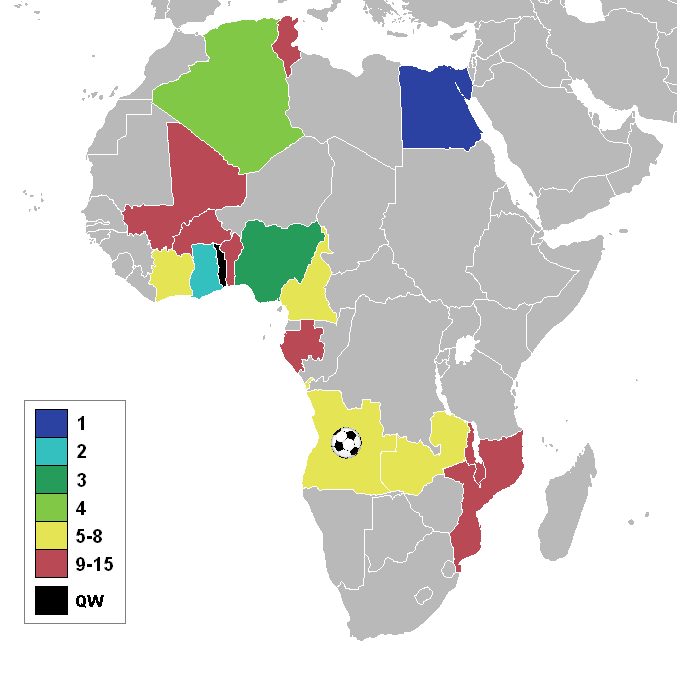
A map of Africa showing the qualified nations, highlighted by stage reached.

- Algeria
- Angola (hosts)
- Benin
- Burkina Faso
- Cameroon
- Egypt
- Gabon
- Ghana
- Ivory Coast
- Malawi
- Mali
- Mozambique
- Nigeria
- Togo (withdrew)
- Tunisia
- Zambia

== Venues ==
| Luanda | 2010 Africa Cup of Nations is located in Angola | Cabinda |
|---|---|---|
| Estádio 11 de Novembro | 2010 Africa Cup of Nations is located in Angola | Estádio Nacional do Chiazi |
| Capacity: 50,000 | 2010 Africa Cup of Nations is located in Angola | Capacity: 20,000 |
| Benguela | 2010 Africa Cup of Nations is located in Angola | Lubango |
| Estádio Nacional de Ombaka | 2010 Africa Cup of Nations is located in Angola | Estádio Nacional da Tundavala |
| Capacity: 35,000 | 2010 Africa Cup of Nations is located in Angola | Capacity: 20,000 |

== Draw ==
The draw for the final tournament took place on 20 November 2009 at the Talatona Convention Centre in Luanda, Angola. The 16 teams were split into four pots, with Pot 1 containing the top four seeded nations. Angola were seeded as hosts and Egypt as reigning holders. The remaining 14 teams were ranked based on their records in the three last editions of the competition. Cameroon and Ivory Coast had the two strongest records and so completed the top seeded Pot 1. The four seeded teams were placed into their groups in advance of the final draw.

| Pot 1 | Pot 2 | Pot 3 | Pot 4 |
|---|---|---|---|
| Angola (hosts); Egypt (title holders); Cameroon; Ivory Coast | Ghana; Nigeria; Tunisia; Mali | Zambia; Benin; Algeria; Togo (withdrew) | Burkina Faso; Mozambique; Gabon; Malawi |

== Match officials ==
The following referees were chosen for the 2010 Africa Cup of Nations.

| Referees | Assistant Referees |
|---|---|
| (Algeria) Mohamed Benouza (Angola) Hélder Martins de Carvalho (Benin) Coffi Codjia (Ivory Coast) Noumandiez Doué (Egypt) Essam Abdel-Fatah (Mali) Koman Coulibaly (Mauritius) Rajindraparsad Seechurn (Saudi Arabia) Khalil Al Ghamdi (Senegal) Badara Diatta (Seychelles) Eddy Maillet (South Africa) Daniel Bennett (South Africa) Jerome Damon (Sudan) Khalid Abdel Rahman (Togo) Kokou Djaoupe (Tunisia) Kacem Bennaceur (Uganda) Muhmed Ssegonga | (Angola) Inácio Manuel Candido (Burundi) Desire Gahungu (Cameroon) Evarist Menkouande (Egypt) Nasser Sadek Abdel Nabi (Eritrea) Angesom Ogbamariam (Ghana) Ayuba Haruna (Iran) Hassan Kamranifar (Libya) Fooad El Maghrabi (Malawi) Moffat Champiti (Morocco) Redouane Achik (Nigeria) Peter Edibe (Saudi Arabia) Mohammed Al Ghamdi (South Africa) Enock Molefe (Rwanda) Celestin Ntagungira (Tunisia) Bechir Hassani (Zambia) Kenneth Chichenga |

== Group stage ==
=== Tie-breaking criteria ===
If two or more teams end the group stage with the same number of points, their ranking is determined by the following criteria:

1. points earned in the matches between the teams concerned;
2. goal difference in the matches between the teams concerned;
3. number of goals scored in the matches between the teams concerned;
4. goal difference in all group matches;
5. number of goals scored in all group matches;
6. fair play points system taking into account the number of yellow and red cards;
7. drawing of lots by the organising committee.

All times given as local time (UTC+1)

=== Group A ===
| Pos | Team | Pld | W | D | L | GF | GA | GD | Pts | Qualification |
|---|---|---|---|---|---|---|---|---|---|---|
| 1 | Angola (H) | 3 | 1 | 2 | 0 | 6 | 4 | +2 | 5 | Advance to knockout stage |
| 2 | Algeria | 3 | 1 | 1 | 1 | 1 | 3 | −2 | 4 (Note: Algeria finished ahead of Mali due to winning the match between the teams (see tie-breaking criteria).) | Advance to knockout stage |
| 3 | Mali | 3 | 1 | 1 | 1 | 7 | 6 | +1 | 4 | |
| 4 | Malawi | 3 | 1 | 0 | 2 | 4 | 5 | −1 | 3 | |

Source: CAF
(H) Hosts
Notes:
10 January 2010
20:00

| Angola | 4–4 | Mali |
|---|---|---|
| Flávio 36', 42'; Gilberto 67' (pen.); Manucho 74' (pen.) | Report | Keita 79', 90+3'; Kanouté 88'; Yatabaré 90+4' |

Estádio 11 de Novembro, Luanda
Attendance: 45,000
Referee: Essam Abdel-Fatah (Egypt)
11 January 2010
14:45

| Malawi | 3–0 | Algeria |
|---|---|---|
| Mwafulirwa 17'; Kafoteka 35'; Banda 48' | Report |

Estádio 11 de Novembro, Luanda
Attendance: 1,000
Referee: Badara Diatta (Senegal)

14 January 2010
17:00

| Mali | 0–1 | Algeria |
|---|---|---|
| | Report | Halliche 43' |

Estádio 11 de Novembro, Luanda
Attendance: 4,000
Referee: Muhmed Ssegonga (Uganda)
14 January 2010
19:30

| Angola | 2–0 | Malawi |
|---|---|---|
| Flávio 49'; Manucho 55' | Report |

Estádio 11 de Novembro, Luanda
Attendance: 48,500
Referee: Noumandiez Doué (Ivory Coast)

18 January 2010
17:00

| Angola | 0–0 | Algeria |
|---|---|---|
| | Report |

Estádio 11 de Novembro, Luanda
Attendance: 40,000
Referee: Jerome Damon (South Africa)
18 January 2010
17:00

| Mali | 3–1 | Malawi |
|---|---|---|
| Kanouté 1'; Keita 3'; Bagayoko 85' | Report | Mwafulirwa 58' |

Estádio Nacional do Chiazi, Cabinda
Attendance: 21,000
Referee: Rajindraparsad Seechurn (Mauritius)

=== Group B ===
| Pos | Team | Pld | W | D | L | GF | GA | GD | Pts | Qualification |
|---|---|---|---|---|---|---|---|---|---|---|
| 1 | Ivory Coast | 2 | 1 | 1 | 0 | 3 | 1 | +2 | 4 | Advance to knockout stage |
| 2 | Ghana | 2 | 1 | 0 | 1 | 2 | 3 | −1 | 3 | Advance to knockout stage |
| 3 | Burkina Faso | 2 | 0 | 1 | 1 | 0 | 1 | −1 | 1 | |
| 4 | Togo (D) | 0 | 0 | 0 | 0 | 0 | 0 | 0 | 0 (Note: Togo withdrew from the tournament due to the attack on their team bus while traveling to their opening match against Ghana, thus they were officially disqualified. Group B became a three-team group.) | |

Source: CAF
(D) Disqualified
Notes:
11 January 2010
17:00

| Ivory Coast | 0–0 | Burkina Faso |
|---|---|---|
| | Report |

Estádio Nacional do Chiazi, Cabinda
Attendance: 5,000
Referee: Kacem Bennaceur (Tunisia)
11 January 2010
19:30

| Ghana | Cancelled | Togo |

Estádio do Chiazi, Cabinda

15 January 2010
17:00

| Burkina Faso | Cancelled | Togo |

Estádio do Chiazi, Cabinda
15 January 2010
19:30

| Ivory Coast | 3–1 | Ghana |
|---|---|---|
| Gervinho 23'; Tiéné 66'; Drogba 90' | Report | Gyan 90+3' (pen.) |

Estádio Nacional do Chiazi, Cabinda
Attendance: 23,000
Referee: Jerome Damon (South Africa)

19 January 2010
17:00

| Burkina Faso | 0–1 | Ghana |
|---|---|---|
| | Report | A. Ayew 30' |

Estádio 11 de Novembro, Luanda
Attendance: 8,000
Referee: Eddy Maillet (Seychelles)
19 January 2010
17:00

| Ivory Coast | Cancelled | Togo |

Estádio do Chiazi, Cabinda

=== Group C ===
| Pos | Team | Pld | W | D | L | GF | GA | GD | Pts | Qualification |
|---|---|---|---|---|---|---|---|---|---|---|
| 1 | Egypt | 3 | 3 | 0 | 0 | 7 | 1 | +6 | 9 | Advance to knockout stage |
| 2 | Nigeria | 3 | 2 | 0 | 1 | 5 | 3 | +2 | 6 | Advance to knockout stage |
| 3 | Benin | 3 | 0 | 1 | 2 | 2 | 5 | −3 | 1 | |
| 4 | Mozambique | 3 | 0 | 1 | 2 | 2 | 7 | −5 | 1 | |

Source: CAF
12 January 2010
17:00

| Egypt | 3–1 | Nigeria |
|---|---|---|
| Moteab 34'; Hassan 54'; Gedo 87' | Report | Obasi 12' |

Complexo da Sr. da Graça, Benguela
Attendance: 18,000
Referee: Rajindraparsad Seechurn (Mauritius)
12 January 2010
19:30

| Mozambique | 2–2 | Benin |
|---|---|---|
| Miro 29'; Fumo 54' | Report | Omotoyossi 14' (pen.); Khan 20' (o.g.) |

Complexo da Sr. da Graça, Benguela
Attendance: 15,000
Referee: Khalid Abdel Rahman (Sudan)

16 January 2010
17:00

| Nigeria | 1–0 | Benin |
|---|---|---|
| Yakubu 42' (pen.) | Report |

Complexo da Sr. da Graça, Benguela
Attendance: 8,000
Referee: Hélder Martins de Carvalho (Angola)
16 January 2010
19:30

| Egypt | 2–0 | Mozambique |
|---|---|---|
| Khan 47' (o.g.); Gedo 81' | Report |

Complexo da Sr. da Graça, Benguela
Attendance: 16,000
Referee: Kokou Djaoupe (Togo)

20 January 2010
17:00

| Egypt | 2–0 | Benin |
|---|---|---|
| Elmohamady 7'; Moteab 23' | Report |

Complexo da Sr. da Graça, Benguela
Attendance: 12,500
Referee: Daniel Bennett (South Africa)
20 January 2010
17:00

| Nigeria | 3–0 | Mozambique |
|---|---|---|
| Odemwingie 45', 47'; Martins 86' | Report |

Estádio Alto da Chela, Lubango
Attendance: 10,000
Referee: Koman Coulibaly (Mali)

=== Group D ===
| Pos | Team | Pld | W | D | L | GF | GA | GD | Pts | Qualification |
|---|---|---|---|---|---|---|---|---|---|---|
| 1 | Zambia | 3 | 1 | 1 | 1 | 5 | 5 | 0 | 4 (Note: The tie-breaking criteria for teams level on points consider only the results of matches between those teams (in this case, this excludes their results against Tunisia). All three teams were level on points and goal difference, and were ranked based on goals scored: Zambia 4, Cameroon 3, Gabon 2.) | Advance to knockout stage |
| 2 | Cameroon | 3 | 1 | 1 | 1 | 5 | 5 | 0 | 4 | Advance to knockout stage |
| 3 | Gabon | 3 | 1 | 1 | 1 | 2 | 2 | 0 | 4 | |
| 4 | Tunisia | 3 | 0 | 3 | 0 | 3 | 3 | 0 | 3 | |

Source: CAF
Notes:
13 January 2010
17:00

| Cameroon | 0–1 | Gabon |
|---|---|---|
| | Report | Cousin 17' |

Estádio Alto da Chela, Lubango
Attendance: 15,000
Referee: Daniel Bennett (South Africa)
13 January 2010
19:30

| Zambia | 1–1 | Tunisia |
|---|---|---|
| J. Mulenga 19' | Report | Dhaouadi 40' |

Estádio Alto da Chela, Lubango
Attendance: 17,000
Referee: Koman Coulibaly (Mali)

17 January 2010
17:00

| Gabon | 0–0 | Tunisia |
|---|---|---|
| | Report |

Estádio Alto da Chela, Lubango
Attendance: 16,000
Referee: Coffi Codjia (Benin)
17 January 2010
19:30

| Cameroon | 3–2 | Zambia |
|---|---|---|
| Geremi 68'; Eto'o 72'; Idrissou 86' | Report | J. Mulenga 8'; C. Katongo 81' (pen.) |

Estádio Alto da Chela, Lubango
Attendance: 15,000
Referee: Khalil Al Ghamdi (Saudi Arabia)

21 January 2010
17:00

| Gabon | 1–2 | Zambia |
|---|---|---|
| F. Do Marcolino 83' | Report | Kalaba 28'; Chamanga 62' |

Complexo da Sr. da Graça, Benguela
Attendance: 5,000
Referee: Mohamed Benouza (Algeria)
21 January 2010
17:00

| Cameroon | 2–2 | Tunisia |
|---|---|---|
| Eto'o 47'; N'Guémo 64' | Report | Chermiti 1'; Chedjou 63' (o.g.) |

Estádio Alto da Chela, Lubango
Attendance: 19,000
Referee: Noumandiez Désiré Doué (Ivory Coast)

== Knockout stage ==
In the knockout stage, extra time and a penalty shoot-out were used to decide the winners if necessary.

=== Bracket ===
Quarter-finals
24 January – Luanda
Angola | 0
Ghana | 1
25 January – Lubango
Zambia | 0 (4)
Nigeria (p) | 0 (5)
24 January – Cabinda
Ivory Coast | 2
Algeria (a.e.t.) | 3
25 January – Benguela
Egypt (a.e.t.) | 3
Cameroon | 1

Semi-finals
28 January – Luanda
Ghana | 1
Nigeria | 0
28 January – Benguela
Algeria | 0
Egypt | 4

Final
31 January – Luanda
Ghana | 0
Egypt | 1
Third place play-off
30 January – Benguela
Nigeria | 1
Algeria | 0

=== Quarter-finals ===
24 January 2010
17:00

| Angola | 0–1 | Ghana |
|---|---|---|
| | Report | Gyan 15' |

Estádio 11 de Novembro, Luanda
Attendance: 50,000
Referee: Mohamed Benouza (Algeria)

24 January 2010
20:30

| Ivory Coast | 2–3 (a.e.t.) | Algeria |
|---|---|---|
| Kalou 4'; Keïta 89' | Report | Matmour 39'; Bougherra 90+2'; Bouazza 92' |

Estádio Chimandela, Cabinda
Attendance: 10,000
Referee: Eddy Maillet (Seychelles)

25 January 2010
17:00

| Egypt | 3–1 (a.e.t.) | Cameroon |
|---|---|---|
| Hassan 37', 104'; Gedo 92' | Report | Hassan 25' (o.g.) |

Complexo da Sr. da Graça, Benguela
Attendance: 12,000
Referee: Jerome Damon (South Africa)

25 January 2010
20:30

| Zambia | 0–0 (a.e.t.) | Nigeria |
|---|---|---|
| | Report |
Penalties
| Chivuta (penalty scored); C. Katongo (penalty scored); Mayuka (penalty scored); Nyrienda (penalty missed); Mweene (penalty scored) | 4–5 | (penalty scored) Mikel; (penalty scored) Martins; (penalty scored) Obinna; (penalty scored) Odemwingie; (penalty scored) Enyeama |

Estádio Alto da Chela, Lubango
Attendance: 10,000
Referee: Essam Abd El Fatah (Egypt)

=== Semi-finals ===
28 January 2010
16:00

| Ghana | 1–0 | Nigeria |
|---|---|---|
| Gyan 21' | Report |

Estádio 11 de Novembro, Luanda
Attendance: 7,500
Referee: Daniel Bennett (South Africa)

28 January 2010
20:30

| Algeria | 0–4 | Egypt |
|---|---|---|
| | Report | Abd Rabo 38' (pen.); Zidan 65'; Abdel-Shafy 80'; Gedo 90+2' |

Complexo da Sr. da Graça, Benguela
Attendance: 30,000
Referee: Coffi Codjia (Benin)

=== Third place play-off ===
30 January 2010
17:00

| Nigeria | 1–0 | Algeria |
|---|---|---|
| Obinna 56' | Report |

Complexo da Sr. da Graça, Benguela
Attendance: 12,000
Referee: Badara Diatta (Senegal)

=== Final ===
31 January 2010
17:00

| Ghana | 0–1 | Egypt |
|---|---|---|
| | Report | Gedo 85' |

Estádio 11 de Novembro, Luanda
Attendance: 50,000
Referee: Koman Coulibaly (Mali)

== Awards ==
- Best player of the competition: (Egypt) Ahmed Hassan
- Fair Play player of the competition: (Egypt) Ahmed Fathy
- Discovery Player of the Tournament: (Egypt) Gedo
- Goalkeeper of the competition: (Egypt) Essam El Hadary
- Top scorer: (Egypt) Gedo

=== Best XI ===
The following players were selected as the best in their respective positions, based on their performances throughout the tournament. Their performances were analysed by the tournament's Technical Study Group (TSG), who picked the team.

| Goalkeepers | Defenders | Midfielders | Forwards |
|---|---|---|---|
| (Egypt) Essam El Hadary | (Algeria) Madjid Bougherra (Egypt) Wael Gomaa (Angola) Mabiná | (Egypt) Ahmed Fathy (Nigeria) Peter Odemwingie (Cameroon) Alex Song (Egypt) Ahmed Hassan | (Ghana) Asamoah Gyan (Egypt) Mohamed Zidan (Angola) Flávio |

Substitutes

- (Ghana) Richard Kingson
- (Egypt) Gedo
- (Zambia) Emmanuel Mbola
- (Algeria) Karim Ziani
- (Cameroon) Achille Emaná
- (Ghana) Kwadwo Asamoah
- (Mali) Seydou Keita
- (Ghana) André Ayew
- (Gabon) Éric Mouloungui
- (Nigeria) Chinedu Obasi
- (Ivory Coast) Salomon Kalou
- (Zambia) Jacob Mulenga

== Goalscorers ==
5 goals

- (Egypt) Gedo

3 goals

- (Angola) Flávio
- (Egypt) Ahmed Hassan
- (Ghana) Asamoah Gyan
- (Mali) Seydou Keita

2 goals

- (Angola) Manucho
- (Cameroon) Samuel Eto'o
- (Egypt) Emad Moteab
- (Malawi) Russel Mwafulirwa
- (Mali) Frédéric Kanouté
- (Nigeria) Peter Odemwingie
- (Zambia) Jacob Mulenga

1 goal

- (Algeria) Hamer Bouazza
- (Algeria) Madjid Bougherra
- (Algeria) Rafik Halliche
- (Algeria) Karim Matmour
- (Angola) Gilberto

1 goal

- (Benin) Razak Omotoyossi
- (Cameroon) Geremi
- (Cameroon) Mohammadou Idrissou
- (Cameroon) Landry N'Guémo
- (Ivory Coast) Didier Drogba
- (Ivory Coast) Gervinho
- (Ivory Coast) Salomon Kalou
- (Ivory Coast) Kader Keïta
- (Ivory Coast) Siaka Tiéné
- (Egypt) Mohamed Abdel-Shafy
- (Egypt) Hosny Abd Rabo
- (Egypt) Ahmed Elmohamady
- (Egypt) Mohamed Zidan
- (Gabon) Daniel Cousin
- (Gabon) Fabrice Do Marcolino
- (Ghana) André Ayew
- (Malawi) Davi Banda
- (Malawi) Elvis Kafoteka
- (Mali) Mamadou Bagayoko
- (Mali) Mustapha Yatabaré

1 goal

- (Mozambique) Fumo
- (Mozambique) Miro
- (Nigeria) Obafemi Martins
- (Nigeria) Chinedu Obasi
- (Nigeria) Victor Obinna
- (Nigeria) Yakubu
- (Tunisia) Amine Chermiti
- (Tunisia) Zouheir Dhaouadi
- (Zambia) James Chamanga
- (Zambia) Rainford Kalaba
- (Zambia) Christopher Katongo

Own goals
2 goals

- (Mozambique) Dario Khan (against Benin and Egypt)

1 goal

- (Cameroon) Aurélien Chedjou (against Tunisia)
- (Egypt) Ahmed Hassan (against Cameroon)

=== Tournament rankings ===
Ranking criteria
For teams eliminated in the same knockout round, the following criteria are applied, in the order given, to determine the final rankings:
1. Goal difference in round eliminated;
2. Goals scored in round eliminated;
3. If teams eliminated in the semi-finals or quarter-finals are tied, the above criteria are reapplied for the previous knockout round, with this process repeated once more should two semi-finalists remain tied;
4. Points in group stage;
5. Goal difference in group stage;
6. Goals scored in group stage;
7. Disciplinary points.

For teams eliminated in the group stage, the following criteria are applied, in the order given, to determine the final rankings:

1. Position in group;
2. Points;
3. Goal difference;
4. Goals scored;
5. Disciplinary points.

| Pos. | Team | G | Pld | W | D | L | Pts | GF | GA | GD |
|---|---|---|---|---|---|---|---|---|---|---|
| 1 | Egypt | C | 6 | 6 | 0 | 0 | 18 | 15 | 2 | +13 |
| 2 | Ghana | B | 5 | 3 | 0 | 2 | 9 | 4 | 4 | 0 |
| 3 | Nigeria | C | 6 | 3 | 1 | 2 | 10 | 6 | 4 | +2 |
| 4 | Algeria | A | 6 | 2 | 1 | 3 | 7 | 4 | 10 | −6 |
Eliminated in the quarter-finals
| 5 | Angola | A | 4 | 1 | 2 | 1 | 5 | 6 | 5 | +1 |
| 6 | Zambia | D | 4 | 1 | 2 | 1 | 5 | 5 | 5 | 0 |
| 7 | Ivory Coast | B | 3 | 1 | 1 | 1 | 4 | 5 | 4 | +1 |
| 8 | Cameroon | D | 4 | 1 | 1 | 2 | 4 | 6 | 8 | −2 |
Eliminated in the group stage
| 9 | Mali | A | 3 | 1 | 1 | 1 | 4 | 7 | 6 | +1 |
| 10 | Gabon | D | 3 | 1 | 1 | 1 | 4 | 2 | 2 | 0 |
| 11 | Tunisia | D | 3 | 0 | 3 | 0 | 3 | 3 | 3 | 0 |
| 12 | Malawi | A | 3 | 1 | 0 | 2 | 3 | 4 | 5 | −1 |
| 13 | Burkina Faso | B | 2 | 0 | 1 | 1 | 1 | 0 | 1 | −1 |
| 14 | Benin | C | 3 | 0 | 1 | 2 | 1 | 2 | 5 | −3 |
| 15 | Mozambique | C | 3 | 0 | 1 | 2 | 1 | 2 | 7 | −5 |

== Statistics ==
- Total number of goals scored: 71
- Average goals per match: 2.45
- Most goals scored by a team in the first round: 7 – Egypt and Mali
- Most goals conceded by a team: 10 – Algeria
- Most goals conceded by a team in the first round: 7 – Mozambique
- Fewest goals conceded by a team in the first round: 1 – Egypt and Burkina Faso*** and Ivory Coast***
- Fewest goals conceded by a team continuing on to the second round: 2 – Egypt
- Fastest goal in a match: 36th second: Kanouté for Mali (against Malawi)
- Latest goal scored in a match: 104th minute: Ahmed Hassan for Egypt (against Cameroon)
- Most goals scored in a match: 8 – Angola 4–4 Mali
- Fewest goals scored in a match: 0 – Ivory Coast vs. Burkina Faso, – Angola vs. Algeria, – Gabon vs. Tunisia– Zambia vs. Nigeria
- Most goals scored by a losing team: 2 – Zambia (against Cameroon); and Ivory Coast (against Algeria)
- Most goals scored in a draw: 8 – Angola 4–4 Mali
- Most goals scored by a winning team: 4 – Egypt (4–0 vs. Algeria)

*** indicates the team played only two matches in the group stage, due to the withdrawal of Togo from the tournament.

== Mascot ==
Palanquinha, the mascot of the 2010 Africa Cup of Nations

The Mascot for the Tournament is Palanquinha, which was inspired by the Giant Sable Antelope (Hippotragus niger variani), a national symbol and a treasured animal in Angola. In Angola, this animal is found only in the Cangandala National Park in Malange Province.

== Match ball ==
The official match ball for the tournament is the Adidas Jabulani Angola, a modified version of the Adidas Jabulani to be used at the 2010 FIFA World Cup, with the colours of the flag of Angola.

== Marketing ==
Tournament had seven sponsors, Doritos, MTN Group, NASUBA, Orange, Pepsi, Samsung and only African corporate sponsor Standard Bank.

== Attack on the Togo national team ==
On 8 January 2010, the team bus of the Togo national football team was attacked by gunmen in Cabinda, Angola as it travelled to the tournament. A spokesman for the Togolese football federation said assistant coach Améleté Abalo and press officer Stanislaud Ocloo had died as well as the driver. The separatist group Front for the Liberation of the Enclave of Cabinda-Military Position claimed responsibility for the attack. The Togolese team withdrew from the competition the following day. The players initially decided to compete as a way to commemorate the victims, but were immediately ordered to return by the Togolese government.

Following their departure from Angola, Togo were formally disqualified from the tournament after failing to fulfil their opening Group B game against Ghana on 11 January.

On 30 January 2010, CAF banned Togo from participating in the next two Africa Cup of Nations tournaments and fined the team $50,000 due to "government involvement in the withdrawal from the tournament". The ban would have meant that Togo would be unable to compete until the 2015 tournament, but that ban was lifted on 14 May 2010 by a ruling from the Court of Arbitration for Sport.
