= 2010 Africa Cup of Nations squads =

Below is a list of squads used in the 2010 Africa Cup of Nations.

== Group A ==
=== Angola ===
Coach: (Portugal) Manuel José

No.	Pos.	Player	Date of birth (age)	Caps	Club|
1	GK	Lamá	1 February 1981 (aged 28)	33	(Angola) Petro Atlético
2	DF	Jamuana	23 November 1984 (aged 25)	10	(Angola) Petro Atlético
3	DF	Enoque	16 August 1987 (aged 22)	6	(Angola) Santos
4	DF	Dias Caires	18 April 1978 (aged 31)	13	(Angola) Petro Atlético
5	DF	Kali	11 October 1978 (aged 31)	50	Unattached
6	MF	David	24 February 1988 (aged 21)	3	(Angola) Petro Atlético
7	MF	Job	27 September 1987 (aged 22)	16	(Angola) Petro Atlético
8	FW	Chara	10 October 1981 (aged 28)	17	(Angola) Petro Atlético
9	FW	Mantorras	18 March 1982 (aged 27)	28	(Portugal) Benfica
10	DF	Zuela	3 August 1983 (aged 26)	4	(Russia) Kuban Krasnodar
11	DF	Gilberto	21 September 1982 (aged 27)	46	(Egypt) Al-Ahly
12	FW	Johnson	23 November 1978 (aged 31)	10	(Angola) C.R.D. Libolo
13	GK	Carlos	18 December 1979 (aged 30)	5	(Portugal) Rio Ave
14	FW	Djalma	30 May 1987 (aged 22)	9	(Portugal) Marítimo
15	DF	Rui Marques	3 September 1977 (aged 32)	16	(England) Leeds United
16	FW	Flávio	30 December 1979 (aged 30)	58	(Saudi Arabia) Al-Shabab
17	MF	Zé Kalanga	12 August 1983 (aged 26)	42	(Romania) Dinamo București
18	FW	Love	14 March 1979 (aged 30)	48	(Angola) Primeiro de Agosto
19	MF	Dédé	4 July 1981 (aged 28)	14	(Romania) Timișoara
20	MF	Stélvio	24 January 1989 (aged 20)	6	(Portugal) União de Leiria
21	MF	Mabiná	6 October 1987 (aged 22)	10	(Angola) Petro Atlético
22	GK	Wilson	22 July 1984 (aged 25)	1	(Angola) Caála
23	FW	Manucho	7 March 1983 (aged 26)	21	(Spain) Real Valladolid

=== Mali ===
Coach: (Nigeria) Stephen Keshi

No.	Pos.	Player	Date of birth (age)	Caps	Club
1	GK	Mahamadou Sidibé	8 October 1978 (aged 31)	54	(Cyprus) Omonia
2	DF	Ousmane Berthé	5 February 1987 (aged 22)	4	(South Africa) Jomo Cosmos
3	DF	Adama Tamboura	18 May 1985 (aged 24)	36	(Sweden) Helsingborgs IF
4	MF	Samba Sow	29 April 1989 (aged 20)	2	(France) Lens
5	DF	Souleymane Diamoutene	30 January 1983 (aged 26)	47	(Italy) Bari
6	MF	Mahamadou Diarra	18 May 1981 (aged 28)	53	(Spain) Real Madrid
7	FW	Tenema N'Diaye	13 February 1981 (aged 28)	14	(France) Nantes
8	FW	Mamadou Diallo	17 April 1982 (aged 27)	36	(France) Le Havre
9	FW	Mamadou Bagayoko	21 May 1979 (aged 30)	24	(France) Nice
10	FW	Modibo Maïga	3 September 1986 (aged 23)	16	(France) Le Mans
11	FW	Mamadou Samassa	1 May 1986 (aged 23)	3	(France) Valenciennes
12	MF	Seydou Keita	16 January 1980 (aged 29)	53	(Spain) Barcelona
13	DF	Bakary Soumaré	9 November 1985 (aged 24)	12	(France) Boulogne
14	MF	Abdou Traoré	17 January 1988 (aged 21)	5	(France) Bordeaux
15	MF	Bakaye Traoré	6 March 1985 (aged 24)	10	(France) Nancy
16	GK	Soumbeïla Diakité	25 August 1984 (aged 25)	10	(Mali) Stade Malien
17	MF	Mahamane Traoré	31 August 1988 (aged 21)	14	(France) Nice
18	MF	Mohamed Sissoko	22 January 1985 (aged 24)	26	(Italy) Juventus
19	FW	Frédéric Kanouté	2 September 1977 (aged 32)	36	(Spain) Sevilla
20	MF	Lassana Fané	11 November 1987 (aged 22)	8	(Sudan) Al-Merreikh
21	FW	Mustapha Yatabaré	26 January 1986 (aged 23)	8	(France) Clermont
22	GK	Oumar Sissoko	13 September 1987 (aged 22)	3	(France) Metz
23	DF	Abdoulaye Maïga	25 May 1984 (aged 25)	4	(Mali) Stade Malien

=== Malawi ===
Coach: Kinnah Phiri

No.	Pos.	Player	Date of birth (age)	Caps	Club
1	GK	Swadic Sanudi	21 October 1983 (aged 26)	43	(South Africa) Dynamos
2	MF	Peter Mgangira	6 October 1980 (aged 29)	22	(Malawi) Silver Strikers
3	DF	Moses Chavula	8 August 1985 (aged 24)	31	(South Africa) Nathi Lions
4	FW	Chiukepo Msowoya	23 September 1988 (aged 21)	20	(Rwanda) APR
5	DF	James Sangala	20 August 1986 (aged 23)	23	(Angola) Primeiro de Agosto
6	DF	Allan Kamanga	29 December 1981 (aged 28)	29	(South Africa) Dynamos
7	DF	Peter Mponda	4 September 1981 (aged 28)	61	(South Africa) Black Leopards
8	MF	Jacob Ngwira	7 September 1985 (aged 24)	11	(South Africa) Carara Kicks
9	FW	Russel Mwafulirwa	24 February 1983 (aged 26)	28	(Sweden) IFK Norrköping
10	MF	Joseph Kamwendo	23 October 1986 (aged 23)	36	(South Africa) Orlando Pirates
11	FW	Essau Kanyenda	27 September 1982 (aged 27)	40	(Russia) KAMAZ
12	DF	Elvis Kafoteka	17 January 1978 (aged 31)	20	(Malawi) Super ESCOM
13	MF	Hellings Mwakasungula	5 May 1980 (aged 29)	21	(Malawi) Silver Strikers
14	FW	Victor Nyirenda	23 August 1988 (aged 21)	6	(Malawi) MTL Wanderers
15	MF	Robert Ng'ambi	11 September 1986 (aged 23)	28	(South Africa) Black Leopards
16	GK	Simplex Nthala	24 February 1988 (aged 21)	1	(Malawi) MTL Wanderers
17	FW	Jimmy Zakazaka	27 December 1984 (aged 25)	22	(South Africa) Bay United
18	FW	Peter Wadabwa	14 September 1988 (aged 21)	13	(South Africa) Thanda Royal Zulu
19	MF	Davi Banda	29 December 1983 (aged 26)	17	(Malawi) Red Lions
20	FW	Atusaye Nyondo	25 July 1988 (aged 21)	8	(South Africa) Carara Kicks
21	DF	Maupo Msowoya	14 May 1982 (aged 27)	32	(Malawi) Super ESCOM
22	GK	Charles Swini	28 February 1985 (aged 24)	1	(Malawi) Super ESCOM
23	DF	Harry Nyirenda	25 August 1990 (aged 19)	2	(Malawi) MTL Wanderers

=== Algeria ===
Coach: Rabah Saadane

No.	Pos.	Player	Date of birth (age)	Caps	Club|
1	GK	Mohamed Ousserir	5 February 1978 (aged 31)	5	(Algeria) CR Belouizdad
2	DF	Madjid Bougherra	7 October 1982 (aged 27)	34	(Scotland) Rangers
3	DF	Nadir Belhadj	18 June 1982 (aged 27)	38	(England) Portsmouth
4	DF	Antar Yahia	21 March 1982 (aged 27)	40	(Germany) VfL Bochum
5	DF	Rafik Halliche	2 September 1986 (aged 23)	10	(Portugal) Nacional
6	MF	Yazid Mansouri (c)	25 February 1978 (aged 31)	59	(France) Lorient
7	MF	Yacine Bezzaz	10 July 1981 (aged 28)	20	(France) Strasbourg
8	MF	Khaled Lemmouchia	6 December 1981 (aged 28)	13	(Algeria) ES Sétif
9	FW	Abdelkader Ghezzal	5 December 1984 (aged 25)	11	(Italy) Siena
10	FW	Rafik Saïfi	7 February 1975 (aged 34)	58	(Qatar) Al-Khor
11	DF	Slimane Raho	20 October 1975 (aged 34)	45	(Algeria) ES Sétif
12	DF	Réda Babouche	3 July 1979 (aged 30)	1	(Algeria) MC Alger
13	FW	Karim Matmour	25 June 1985 (aged 24)	17	(Germany) Borussia Mönchengladbach
14	DF	Abdelkader Laïfaoui	9 July 1981 (aged 28)	3	(Algeria) ES Sétif
15	MF	Karim Ziani	17 August 1982 (aged 27)	47	(Germany) VfL Wolfsburg
16	GK	Faouzi Chaouchi	5 December 1984 (aged 25)	4	(Algeria) ES Sétif
17	DF	Samir Zaoui	3 June 1976 (aged 33)	22	(Algeria) ASO Chlef
18	MF	Hamer Bouazza	22 February 1985 (aged 24)	11	(England) Blackpool
19	MF	Hassan Yebda	14 May 1984 (aged 25)	3	(England) Portsmouth
20	MF	Mourad Meghni	16 April 1984 (aged 25)	5	(Italy) Lazio
21	FW	Abdelmalek Ziaya	23 January 1984 (aged 25)	1	(Saudi Arabia) Al-Ittihad
22	MF	Djamel Abdoun	14 February 1986 (aged 23)	0	(France) Nantes
23	GK	Lamine Zemmamouche	2 January 1985 (aged 25)	0	(Algeria) MC Alger

== Group B ==
=== Ivory Coast ===
Coach: (Bosnia and Herzegovina) Vahid Halilhodžić

No.	Pos.	Player	Date of birth (age)	Caps	Club|
1	GK	Boubacar Barry	30 December 1979 (aged 30)	42	(Belgium) Lokeren
2	DF	Benjamin Angoua	28 November 1986 (aged 23)	7	(Hungary) Honvéd
3	DF	Arthur Boka	2 April 1983 (aged 26)	54	(Germany) VfB Stuttgart
4	DF	Kolo Touré	19 March 1981 (aged 28)	74	(England) Manchester City
5	MF	Didier Zokora	14 December 1980 (aged 29)	78	(Spain) Sevilla
6	DF	Yaya Touré	13 May 1983 (aged 26)	45	(Spain) Barcelona
7	MF	Emerse Faé	24 January 1984 (aged 25)	37	(France) Nice
8	FW	Salomon Kalou	5 August 1985 (aged 24)	26	(England) Chelsea
9	MF	Cheick Tioté	21 June 1986 (aged 23)	6	(Netherlands) Twente
10	FW	Gervinho	27 May 1987 (aged 22)	13	(France) Lille
11	FW	Didier Drogba	11 March 1978 (aged 31)	63	(England) Chelsea
12	DF	Abdoulaye Méïté	6 October 1980 (aged 29)	48	(England) West Bromwich Albion
13	MF	Jean-Jacques Gosso	15 March 1983 (aged 26)	6	(France) Monaco
14	FW	Bakari Koné	17 September 1981 (aged 28)	41	(France) Marseille
15	FW	Aruna Dindane	26 November 1980 (aged 29)	54	(England) Portsmouth
16	GK	Aristide Zogbo	30 December 1981 (aged 28)	6	(Israel) Maccabi Netanya
17	MF	Siaka Tiéné	22 February 1982 (aged 27)	52	(France) Valenciennes
18	MF	Kader Keïta	6 August 1981 (aged 28)	52	(Turkey) Galatasaray
19	MF	Emmanuel Koné	31 December 1986 (aged 23)	12	(Romania) Internațional
20	DF	Guy Demel	13 June 1981 (aged 28)	24	(Germany) Hamburger SV
21	DF	Emmanuel Eboué	4 June 1983 (aged 26)	50	(England) Arsenal
22	DF	Sol Bamba	13 January 1985 (aged 24)	13	(Scotland) Hibernian
23	GK	Vincent Angban	2 February 1985 (aged 24)	2	(Ivory Coast) ASEC Mimosas

=== Burkina Faso ===
Coach: (Portugal) Paulo Duarte

No.	Pos.	Player	Date of birth (age)	Caps	Club|
1	GK	Daouda Diakité	30 March 1983 (aged 26)	14	(Egypt) Al-Mokawloon Al-Arab
2	DF	Moussa Ouattara	31 December 1981 (aged 28)	27	(Germany) 1. FC Kaiserslautern
3	DF	Ibrahim Gnanou	8 November 1986 (aged 23)	7	(Russia) Alania Vladikavkaz
4	DF	Mamadou Tall	4 December 1982 (aged 27)	32	(Portugal) União de Leiria
5	MF	Mohamed Koffi	30 December 1986 (aged 23)	5	(Egypt) Petrojet
6	DF	Bakary Koné	27 April 1988 (aged 21)	12	(France) Guingamp
7	MF	Florent Rouamba	31 December 1986 (aged 23)	18	(Moldova) Sheriff Tiraspol
8	MF	Mahamoudou Kéré	2 January 1982 (aged 28)	36	(Belgium) Charleroi
9	FW	Moumouni Dagano	3 January 1981 (aged 29)	44	(Qatar) Al-Khor
10	FW	Wilfried Sanou	16 March 1984 (aged 25)	14	(Germany) 1. FC Köln
11	FW	Jonathan Pitroipa	12 April 1986 (aged 23)	19	(Germany) Hamburger SV
12	DF	Saïdou Panandétiguiri	22 March 1984 (aged 25)	32	(Portugal) União de Leiria
13	MF	Issouf Ouattara	7 October 1988 (aged 21)	6	(Portugal) União de Leiria
14	MF	Patrick Zoundi	19 July 1982 (aged 27)	15	(Germany) Fortuna Düsseldorf
15	FW	Narcisse Yaméogo	19 November 1980 (aged 29)	20	(Azerbaijan) Mughan
16	GK	Adama Sawadogo	20 January 1990 (aged 19)	1	(Burkina Faso) ASFA Yennega
17	DF	Paul Koulibaly	24 March 1986 (aged 23)	17	(Libya) Al-Ittihad
18	MF	Charles Kaboré	9 February 1988 (aged 21)	19	(France) Marseille
19	FW	Yssouf Koné	19 February 1982 (aged 27)	10	(Romania) Cluj
20	MF	Abdoul-Aziz Nikiema	12 June 1985 (aged 24)	12	(China) Qingdao Jonoon
21	FW	Habib Bamogo	8 May 1982 (aged 27)	4	(France) Nice
22	GK	Germain Sanou	26 May 1992 (aged 17)	0	(Burkina Faso) Saint-Étienne
23	DF	Wilfried Benjamin Balima	20 March 1985 (aged 24)	2	(Moldova) Sheriff Tiraspol

=== Ghana ===
Coach: (Serbia) Milovan Rajevac

No.	Pos.	Player	Date of birth (age)	Caps	Club
1	GK	Philemon McCarthy	14 August 1983 (aged 26)	2	(Ghana) Hearts of Oak
2	DF	Hans Sarpei	28 June 1976 (aged 33)	23	(Germany) Bayer Leverkusen
3	FW	Asamoah Gyan	22 November 1985 (aged 24)	28	(France) Rennes
4	FW	Ransford Osei	5 December 1990 (aged 19)	1	(Netherlands) Twente
5	DF	Jonathan Mensah	13 July 1990 (aged 19)	2	(South Africa) Free State Stars
6	MF	Anthony Annan	21 June 1986 (aged 23)	38	(Norway) Rosenborg
7	DF	Samuel Inkoom	22 August 1989 (aged 20)	4	(Switzerland) Basel
8	MF	Michael Essien	3 December 1982 (aged 27)	45	(England) Chelsea
9	MF	Agyemang Opoku	7 June 1989 (aged 20)	2	(Qatar) Al-Sadd
10	MF	Kwadwo Asamoah	9 September 1988 (aged 21)	22	(Italy) Udinese
11	MF	Moussa Narry	19 April 1986 (aged 23)	3	(France) Auxerre
12	DF	Lee Addy	26 September 1985 (aged 24)	1	(Ghana) Bechem Chelsea
13	FW	André Ayew	17 December 1989 (aged 20)	15	(France) Arles-Avignon
14	FW	Matthew Amoah	24 October 1980 (aged 29)	31	(Netherlands) NAC Breda
15	DF	Isaac Vorsah	21 June 1988 (aged 21)	5	(Germany) 1899 Hoffenheim
16	GK	Daniel Adjei	10 November 1989 (aged 20)	1	(Ghana) Liberty Professionals
17	DF	Ibrahim Ayew	16 April 1988 (aged 21)	1	(Egypt) Zamalek
18	DF	Eric Addo	12 November 1978 (aged 31)	32	(Netherlands) Roda JC
19	MF	Emmanuel Badu	12 February 1990 (aged 19)	2	(Italy) Udinese
20	FW	Dominic Adiyiah	29 November 1989 (aged 20)	1	(Italy) Milan
21	DF	Harrison Afful	24 June 1986 (aged 23)	14	(Tunisia) Espérance
22	GK	Richard Kingson	13 June 1978 (aged 31)	58	(England) Wigan Athletic
23	FW	Haminu Dramani	1 April 1986 (aged 23)	27	(Russia) Kuban Krasnodar

=== Togo ===
Togo withdrew before the competition began following the attack on their team bus that left three people dead and others injured.

Coach: (France) Hubert Velud

No.	Pos.	Player	Date of birth (age)	Caps	Club|
1	GK	Dodo Obilalé	8 October 1984 (aged 25)	16	(France) GSI Pontivy
2	DF	Vincent Bossou	7 February 1986 (aged 23)	0	(Togo) Maranatha
3	DF	Kwami Eninful	20 November 1984 (aged 25)	9	(Tunisia) Monastir
4	FW	Emmanuel Adebayor	26 February 1984 (aged 25)	38	(England) Manchester City
5	DF	Serge Akakpo	15 October 1987 (aged 22)	10	(Romania) Vaslui
6	DF	Abdoul Mamah	24 August 1985 (aged 24)	36	(Moldova) Sheriff Tiraspol
7	MF	Moustapha Salifou	1 June 1983 (aged 26)	45	(England) Aston Villa
8	FW	Komlan Amewou	15 December 1983 (aged 26)	30	(Norway) Strømsgodset IF
9	FW	Thomas Dossevi	6 March 1979 (aged 30)	25	(France) Nantes
10	MF	Floyd Ayité	15 December 1988 (aged 21)	7	(France) Nancy
11	FW	Jonathan Ayité	21 July 1985 (aged 24)	7	(France) Nîmes
12	DF	Éric Akoto	10 July 1980 (aged 29)	32	(Greece) OFI Crete
13	DF	Richmond Forson	23 May 1980 (aged 29)	18	(France) Thouars
14	DF	Akimsola Boussari	10 March 1988 (aged 21)	3	(Nigeria) Enugu Rangers
15	MF	Alaixys Romao	18 January 1984 (aged 25)	30	(France) Grenoble
16	GK	Kossi Agassa	2 July 1978 (aged 31)	52	(France) Istres
17	FW	Serge Gakpé	7 May 1987 (aged 22)	3	(France) Monaco
18	MF	Junior Sènaya	19 April 1984 (aged 25)	33	(United Arab Emirates) Dibba Al-Hasn
19	MF	Sapol Mani	5 June 1991 (aged 18)	4	(Libya) Alittihad
20	MF	Guillaume Brenner	1 February 1986 (aged 23)	4	(Cyprus) Alki Larnaca
21	FW	Liyabé Kpatoumbi	25 May 1986 (aged 23)	2	(Togo) ASKO Kara
22	GK	Baba Tchagouni	31 December 1990 (aged 19)	0	(France) Dijon
23	DF	Assimiou Touré	1 January 1988 (aged 22)	10	(Germany) Bayer Leverkusen

== Group C ==
=== Egypt ===
Coach: Hassan Shehata

No.	Pos.	Player	Date of birth (age)	Caps	Club
1	GK	Essam El-Hadary	15 January 1973 (aged 36)	119	(Egypt) Ismaily
2	DF	Mahmoud Fathalla	13 February 1982 (aged 27)	31	(Egypt) Zamalek
3	DF	Ahmed Elmohamady	9 September 1987 (aged 23)	38	(Egypt) Enppi
4	DF	Moatasem Salem	2 September 1980 (aged 29)	5	(Egypt) Ismaily
5	DF	Abdel-Zaher El-Saqqa	30 January 1974 (aged 35)	111	(Turkey) Eskişehirspor
6	DF	Hany Said	22 April 1980 (aged 29)	56	(Egypt) Zamalek
7	DF	Ahmed Fathy	10 November 1984 (aged 25)	65	(Egypt) Al-Ahly
8	MF	Hosny Abd Rabo	1 November 1984 (aged 25)	79	(United Arab Emirates) Ahli Dubai
9	FW	Mohamed Zidan	11 December 1981 (aged 28)	34	(Germany) Borussia Dortmund
10	FW	Emad Moteab	20 February 1983 (aged 26)	60	(Egypt) Al-Ahly
11	MF	Ahmed Eid Abdel Malek	15 May 1980 (aged 29)	36	(Egypt) Haras El Hodood
12	MF	Hossam Ghaly	15 December 1981 (aged 28)	34	(Saudi Arabia) Al-Nassr
13	MF	Abdelaziz Tawfik	24 May 1986 (aged 23)	8	(Egypt) Enppi
14	DF	Sayed Moawad	25 May 1979 (aged 30)	41	(Egypt) Al-Ahly
15	FW	Gedo	30 October 1984 (aged 25)	8	(Egypt) Ittihad
16	GK	Abdelwahed El-Sayed	3 June 1977 (aged 32)	28	(Egypt) Zamalek
17	MF	Ahmed Hassan	2 May 1975 (aged 34)	172	(Egypt) Al-Ahly
18	FW	Shikabala	5 March 1986 (aged 23)	11	(Egypt) Zamalek
19	DF	Mohamed Abdel-Shafy	1 July 1985 (aged 24)	6	(Egypt) Zamalek
20	DF	Wael Gomaa	3 August 1975 (aged 34)	93	(Egypt) Al-Ahly
21	FW	Ahmed Raouf	15 April 1982 (aged 27)	9	(Egypt) Enppi
22	FW	Elsayed Hamdi	1 March 1984 (aged 25)	2	(Egypt) Petrojet
23	GK	Mahmoud Abou El-Saoud	30 November 1987 (aged 22)	1	(Egypt) El-Mansoura

=== Nigeria ===
Coach: Shaibu Amodu

No.	Pos.	Player	Date of birth (age)	Caps	Club
1	GK	Vincent Enyeama	29 August 1982 (aged 27)	44	(Israel) Hapoel Tel Aviv
2	DF	Joseph Yobo	6 September 1980 (aged 29)	64	(England) Everton
3	DF	Taye Taiwo	16 April 1985 (aged 24)	29	(France) Marseille
4	FW	Nwankwo Kanu	1 August 1976 (aged 33)	79	(England) Portsmouth
5	DF	Obinna Nwaneri	19 March 1982 (aged 27)	32	(Switzerland) Sion
6	DF	Danny Shittu	2 September 1980 (aged 29)	17	(England) Bolton Wanderers
7	FW	Chinedu Obasi	1 June 1986 (aged 23)	16	(Germany) 1899 Hoffenheim
8	FW	Yakubu	22 November 1982 (aged 27)	45	(England) Everton
9	FW	Obafemi Martins	28 October 1984 (aged 25)	24	(Germany) VfL Wolfsburg
10	MF	Mikel John Obi	22 April 1987 (aged 22)	28	(England) Chelsea
11	FW	Peter Odemwingie	15 July 1981 (aged 28)	31	(Russia) Lokomotiv Moscow
12	GK	Austin Ejide	8 April 1984 (aged 25)	13	(Israel) Hapoel Petah Tikva
13	MF	Ayila Yussuf	4 November 1984 (aged 25)	16	(Ukraine) Dynamo Kyiv
14	MF	Seyi Olofinjana	30 June 1980 (aged 29)	22	(England) Hull City
15	MF	Sani Kaita	2 May 1986 (aged 23)	9	(Russia) Lokomotiv Moscow
16	FW	Kalu Uche	15 November 1982 (aged 27)	10	(Spain) Almería
17	DF	Chidi Odiah	17 December 1983 (aged 26)	18	(Russia) CSKA Moscow
18	FW	Victor Obinna	25 March 1987 (aged 22)	18	(Spain) Málaga
19	DF	Yusuf Mohamed	5 November 1983 (aged 26)	7	(Switzerland) Sion
20	MF	Dickson Etuhu	8 June 1982 (aged 27)	6	(England) Fulham
21	DF	Elderson Echiéjilé	20 January 1988 (aged 21)	4	(France) Rennes
22	DF	Onyekachi Apam	30 December 1986 (aged 23)	7	(France) Nice
23	GK	Dele Aiyenugba	20 November 1983 (aged 26)	7	(Israel) Bnei Yehuda

=== Mozambique ===
Coach: (Netherlands) Mart Nooij

No.	Pos.	Player	Date of birth (age)	Caps	Club|
1	GK	Bino	21 April 1982 (aged 27)	4	(Mozambique) Liga Muçulmana
2	DF	Hagi	29 May 1985 (aged 24)	20	(Mozambique) Ferroviario de Maputo
3	MF	Genito	3 March 1979 (aged 30)	22	(Cyprus) Nea Salamina
4	MF	Simão Mate	23 July 1988 (aged 21)	19	(Greece) Panathinaikos
5	DF	Paíto	5 July 1982 (aged 27)	24	(Switzerland) Sion
6	DF	Mano	28 April 1984 (aged 25)	23	(Egypt) ENPPI
7	MF	Domingues	13 November 1983 (aged 26)	27	(South Africa) Mamelodi Sundowns
8	FW	Fumo	22 September 1979 (aged 30)	20	(Cyprus) Olympiakos Nicosia
9	FW	Tico-Tico	16 August 1973 (aged 36)	82	(South Africa) Jomo Cosmos
10	FW	Dário	27 February 1977 (aged 32)	85	(South Africa) Supersport United
11	FW	Hélder	20 September 1987 (aged 22)	4	(Portugal) Portimonense
12	GK	Kapango	14 September 1975 (aged 34)	27	(Egypt) Tersana
13	DF	Fanuel	19 December 1982 (aged 27)	17	(Mozambique) Liga Muçulmana
14	MF	Danito	5 June 1983 (aged 26)	14	(Mozambique) Ferroviario de Maputo
15	DF	Whiskey	6 May 1986 (aged 23)	13	(Mozambique) Ferroviario de Maputo
16	DF	Miro	30 April 1982 (aged 27)	24	(South Africa) Platinum Stars
17	MF	Ze Luis	28 May 1989 (aged 20)	3	(Egypt) Baladeyet El-Mahalla
18	DF	Dario Khan	24 January 1984 (aged 25)	20	(Qatar) Al-Kharitiyath
19	DF	Zainadine Junior	24 June 1988 (aged 21)	1	(Mozambique) Desportivo de Maputo
20	MF	Josemar	7 August 1986 (aged 23)	10	(Mozambique) Costa do Sol
21	DF	Campira	9 April 1982 (aged 27)	13	(Mozambique) Maxaquene
22	GK	Lamá	15 January 1985 (aged 24)	0	(Mozambique) Ferroviario Maputo
23	DF	Mexer	8 September 1987 (aged 22)	10	(Portugal) Sporting CP

=== Benin ===
Coach: (France) Michel Dussuyer

No.	Pos.	Player	Date of birth (age)	Caps	Club|
1	GK	Yoann Djidonou	17 May 1986 (aged 23)	16	(France) Libourne
2	DF	Salomon Junior	8 April 1986 (aged 23)	0	(Benin) ASPAC
3	DF	Khaled Adénon	28 July 1985 (aged 24)	25	(France) Bastia
4	MF	Djiman Koukou	14 November 1980 (aged 29)	9	(France) Evian
5	DF	Damien Chrysostome	24 May 1982 (aged 27)	43	(Turkey) Denizlispor
6	DF	Réda Johnson	21 March 1988 (aged 21)	3	(England) Plymouth Argyle
7	MF	Romuald Boco	8 July 1985 (aged 24)	35	(Republic of Ireland) Sligo Rovers
8	FW	Razak Omotoyossi	8 October 1985 (aged 24)	31	(France) Metz
9	FW	Mohamed Golanne	30 November 1989 (aged 20)	3	(Croatia) NK Pula
10	FW	Nouhoum Kobéna	5 January 1985 (aged 25)	11	(Libya) Almadina
11	MF	Mouritala Ogunbiyi	10 October 1982 (aged 27)	32	(France) Guingamp
12	DF	Félicien Singbo	25 October 1980 (aged 29)	15	(Bulgaria) Lokomotiv Plovdiv
13	MF	Pascal Angan	19 April 1986 (aged 23)	4	(Morocco) Wydad Casablanca
14	FW	Mickaël Poté	24 September 1984 (aged 25)	10	(France) Nice
15	MF	Gérard Adanhoume	26 November 1986 (aged 23)	0	(Benin) Soleil
16	GK	Rachad Chitou	18 September 1976 (aged 33)	26	(Nigeria) Wikki Tourists
17	MF	Stéphane Sessègnon	1 June 1984 (aged 25)	24	(France) Paris Saint-Germain
18	MF	Séïdath Tchomogo	13 August 1985 (aged 24)	34	(Bahrain) East Riffa
19	MF	Jocelyn Ahouéya	19 December 1985 (aged 24)	43	(Switzerland) Sion
20	MF	Arnaud Séka	30 October 1985 (aged 24)	0	(Benin) Tonnerre d'Abomey
21	DF	Mouftaou Adou	10 April 1991 (aged 18)	2	(Benin) ASPAC
22	GK	Valère Amoussou	10 March 1987 (aged 22)	2	(Benin) AS Porto-Novo
23	DF	Emmanuel Imorou	16 September 1988 (aged 21)	0	(France) Gueugnon

== Group D ==
=== Cameroon ===
Coach: (France) Paul Le Guen

No.	Pos.	Player	Date of birth (age)	Caps	Club
1	GK	Carlos Kameni	18 February 1984 (aged 25)	53	(Spain) Espanyol
2	MF	Gilles Binya	29 August 1984 (aged 25)	12	(Switzerland) Neuchâtel Xamax
3	DF	Nicolas N'Koulou	27 March 1990 (aged 19)	7	(France) Monaco
4	DF	Rigobert Song	1 July 1976 (aged 33)	131	(Turkey) Trabzonspor
5	DF	Aurélien Chedjou	20 June 1985 (aged 24)	4	(France) Lille
6	DF	Alex Song	9 September 1987 (aged 22)	15	(England) Arsenal
7	MF	Landry N'Guémo	28 November 1985 (aged 24)	14	(Scotland) Celtic
8	MF	Geremi	20 December 1978 (aged 31)	107	(Turkey) Ankaragücü
9	FW	Samuel Eto'o	10 March 1981 (aged 28)	89	(Italy) Inter Milan
10	MF	Achille Emaná	5 June 1982 (aged 27)	27	(Spain) Real Betis
11	MF	Jean Makoun	29 May 1983 (aged 26)	41	(France) Lyon
12	DF	Henri Bedimo	4 June 1984 (aged 25)	2	(France) Lens
13	MF	Somen Tchoyi	29 March 1983 (aged 26)	10	(Austria) Red Bull Salzburg
14	FW	Paul Alo'o	12 November 1983 (aged 26)	6	(France) Nancy
15	FW	Pierre Webó	20 January 1982 (aged 27)	34	(Spain) Mallorca
16	GK	Souleymanou Hamidou	22 November 1973 (aged 36)	18	(Turkey) Kayserispor
17	FW	Mohammadou Idrissou	8 March 1980 (aged 29)	24	(Germany) SC Freiburg
18	MF	Eyong Enoh	23 March 1986 (aged 23)	7	(Netherlands) Ajax
19	DF	Stéphane Mbia	20 May 1986 (aged 23)	26	(France) Marseille
20	MF	Georges Mandjeck	9 December 1988 (aged 21)	1	(Germany) 1. FC Kaiserslautern
21	DF	Joël Matip	8 August 1991 (aged 18)	0	(Germany) Schalke 04
22	GK	Guy N'dy Assembé	28 February 1986 (aged 23)	0	(France) Valenciennes
23	DF	André Bikey	8 January 1985 (aged 25)	22	(England) Burnley

=== Gabon ===
Coach: (France) Alain Giresse

No.	Pos.	Player	Date of birth (age)	Caps	Club
1	GK	Didier Ovono	23 January 1983 (aged 26)	37	(France) Le Mans
2	DF	Georges Ambourouet	1 May 1986 (aged 23)	21	(North Macedonia) Makedonija
3	MF	Arsène Copa	7 June 1988 (aged 21)	3	(Hungary) Győr
4	DF	Erwin Nguéma	7 March 1989 (aged 20)	3	(Cameroon) Cotonsport Garoua
5	DF	Bruno Ecuele Manga	16 July 1988 (aged 21)	16	(France) Angers
6	DF	Ernest Akouassaga	16 September 1985 (aged 24)	13	(France) Nantes
7	MF	Stéphane N'Guéma	20 November 1984 (aged 25)	16	(Moldova) Olimpia Bălți
8	FW	Daniel Cousin	7 February 1977 (aged 32)	19	(England) Hull City
9	FW	Pierre-Emerick Aubameyang	28 January 1989 (aged 20)	2	(France) Lille
10	MF	Alain Djissikadié	5 January 1977 (aged 33)	31	(Democratic Republic of the Congo) TP Mazembe
11	FW	Éric Mouloungui	1 April 1984 (aged 25)	14	(France) Nice
12	FW	Willy Aubameyang	16 February 1987 (aged 22)	2	(Belgium) Eupen
13	MF	Bruno Zita	15 July 1980 (aged 29)	23	(Turkey) Sivasspor
14	MF	Paul Kessany	16 April 1985 (aged 24)	31	(France) Istres
15	DF	Arsène Do Marcolino	26 November 1986 (aged 23)	6	(France) Les Herbiers
16	GK	Boris Nguéma Békalé	7 December 1984 (aged 25)	5	(Gabon) USM Libreville
17	DF	Moïse Brou	4 February 1982 (aged 27)	10	(France) Brest
18	MF	Cédric Moubamba	14 October 1979 (aged 30)	43	(Oman) Dhofar
19	DF	Rodrigue Moundounga	28 August 1982 (aged 27)	37	(Gabon) Mangasport
20	FW	Fabrice Do Marcolino	14 March 1983 (aged 26)	53	(France) Stade Laval
21	MF	Thierry Issiémou	31 March 1983 (aged 26)	25	(Tunisia) Monastir
22	GK	Yves Bitséki Moto	23 April 1983 (aged 26)	0	(Gabon) Bitam
23	FW	Roguy Méyé	7 October 1986 (aged 23)	14	(Turkey) Ankaragücü

=== Zambia ===
Coach: (France) Hervé Renard

No.	Pos.	Player	Date of birth (age)	Caps	Club
1	GK	Kalililo Kakonje	1 June 1985 (aged 24)	13	(South Africa) AmaZulu
2	MF	Francis Kasonde	1 September 1986 (aged 23)	18	(Oman) Al-Suwaiq
3	DF	Dennis Banda	10 December 1988 (aged 21)	14	(Zambia) Green Buffaloes
4	DF	Joseph Musonda	30 May 1977 (aged 32)	58	(South Africa) Golden Arrows
5	DF	Hijani Himoonde	15 June 1985 (aged 24)	13	(Zambia) Lusaka Dynamos
6	DF	Emmanuel Mbola	10 May 1993 (aged 16)	11	(Armenia) Pyunik
7	FW	Jacob Mulenga	12 February 1984 (aged 25)	26	(Netherlands) Utrecht
8	MF	Isaac Chansa	23 March 1984 (aged 25)	26	(Sweden) Helsingborgs IF
9	FW	Collins Mbesuma	3 February 1984 (aged 25)	2	(South Africa) Moroka Swallows
10	MF	Felix Katongo	18 April 1984 (aged 25)	34	(South Africa) Mamelodi Sundowns
11	MF	Christopher Katongo	31 August 1982 (aged 27)	50	(Germany) Arminia Bielefeld
12	FW	James Chamanga	2 February 1980 (aged 29)	29	(China) Dalian Shide
13	DF	Stophira Sunzu	22 June 1989 (aged 20)	9	(Zambia) Zanaco
14	MF	Noah Chivuta	25 December 1983 (aged 26)	12	(South Africa) Maritzburg United
15	DF	Chintu Kampamba	28 December 1980 (aged 29)	17	(South Africa) Free State Stars
16	GK	Kennedy Mweene	11 December 1984 (aged 25)	44	(South Africa) Free State Stars
17	MF	Rainford Kalaba	14 August 1986 (aged 23)	36	(Portugal) União de Leiria
18	FW	Given Singuluma	26 September 1985 (aged 24)	13	(Democratic Republic of the Congo) TP Mazembe
19	DF	Thomas Nyrienda	21 January 1984 (aged 25)	4	(Zambia) Zanaco
20	MF	William Njovu	4 March 1987 (aged 22)	9	(Israel) Hapoel Kiryat Shmona
21	FW	Emmanuel Mayuka	21 November 1990 (aged 19)	15	(Israel) Maccabi Tel Aviv
22	GK	Jacob Banda	11 February 1988 (aged 21)	8	(Zambia) ZESCO United
23	MF	Clifford Mulenga	5 August 1987 (aged 22)	15	(South Africa) Mpumalanga Black Aces

=== Tunisia ===
Coach: Faouzi Benzarti

No.	Pos.	Player	Date of birth (age)	Caps	Club
1	GK	Adel Nefzi	16 March 1974 (aged 35)	3	(Tunisia) Club Africain
2	DF	Khaled Souissi	20 May 1985 (aged 24)	10	(Tunisia) Club Africain
3	DF	Karim Haggui	20 January 1984 (aged 25)	62	(Germany) Hannover 96
4	DF	Radhouène Felhi	25 March 1984 (aged 25)	23	(Germany) 1860 Munich
5	DF	Ammar Jemal	20 April 1987 (aged 22)	6	(Tunisia) Étoile du Sahel
6	MF	Hocine Ragued	11 February 1983 (aged 26)	21	(Czech Republic) Slavia Prague
7	MF	Chaouki Ben Saada	1 July 1984 (aged 25)	30	(France) Nice
8	MF	Khaled Korbi	16 December 1985 (aged 24)	6	(Tunisia) Espérance ST
9	FW	Amine Chermiti	26 December 1987 (aged 22)	29	(Saudi Arabia) Ittihad Jeddah
10	MF	Oussama Darragi	3 April 1987 (aged 22)	12	(Tunisia) Espérance ST
11	DF	Souheïl Ben Radhia	26 August 1985 (aged 24)	2	(Tunisia) Étoile du Sahel
12	DF	Khalil Chemmam	24 July 1987 (aged 22)	2	(Tunisia) Espérance ST
13	MF	Chadi Hammami	14 June 1986 (aged 23)	8	(Tunisia) CS Sfaxien
14	MF	Haytham Mrabet	15 October 1980 (aged 29)	4	(Tunisia) CS Sfaxien
15	FW	Zouheir Dhaouadi	1 January 1988 (aged 22)	4	(Tunisia) Club Africain
16	GK	Aymen Mathlouthi	14 September 1984 (aged 25)	27	(Tunisia) Étoile du Sahel
17	FW	Issam Jemâa	28 January 1984 (aged 25)	38	(France) Lens
18	DF	Yassin Mikari	9 January 1983 (aged 27)	25	(France) Sochaux
19	FW	Youssef Msakni	28 October 1990 (aged 19)	0	(Tunisia) Espérance ST
20	MF	Mohamed Ali Nafkha	25 January 1986 (aged 23)	5	(Tunisia) Étoile du Sahel
21	DF	Bilel Ifa	9 March 1990 (aged 19)	3	(Tunisia) Club Africain
22	GK	Farouk Ben Mustapha	1 July 1989 (aged 20)	0	(Tunisia) CA Bizertin
23	FW	Ahmed Akaichi	23 February 1989 (aged 20)	0	(Tunisia) Étoile du Sahel
