= 2010 Africa Cup of Nations Group D =

Football tournament group stage

Group D was one of four groups of national teams competing at the 2010 Africa Cup of Nations. The group's first round of matches began on January 10 and its last matches were played on January 18. Most matches were played at the Estádio Alto da Chela in Lubango and featuring Zambia, Mali, Tunisia, and Cameroon. This was a very tight group with three teams being level on four points and the Tunisians being undefeated but eliminated.

== Standings ==
Pos	Team	Pld	W	D	L	GF	GA	GD	Pts	Qualification
1	Zambia	3	1	1	1	5	5	0	4 (Note: The tie-breaking criteria for teams level on points consider only the results of matches between those teams (in this case, this excludes their results against Tunisia). All three teams were level on points and goal difference, and were ranked based on goals scored: Zambia 4, Cameroon 3, Gabon 2.)	Advance to knockout stage
2	Cameroon	3	1	1	1	5	5	0	4	Advance to knockout stage
3	Gabon	3	1	1	1	2	2	0	4	
4	Tunisia	3	0	3	0	3	3	0	3	

Source: CAF

== Cameroon vs Gabon ==
13 January 2010
17:00

Cameroon	0–1	Gabon
	Report	Cousin 17'

Estádio Alto da Chela, Lubango
Attendance: 15,000
Referee: Daniel Bennett (South Africa)

GK	1	Carlos Kameni
DF	4	Rigobert Song
DF	6	Alex Song
DF	3	Nicolas N'Koulou
DF	12	Henri Bedimo	(substituted off) 76'
MF	7	Landry N'Guémo	(substituted off) 46'
MF	8	Geremi Njitap
MF	11	Jean Makoun
MF	10	Achille Emana
FW	9	Samuel Eto'o
FW	15	Pierre Webó	(substituted off) 64'
Substitutions:
FW	13	Somen Tchoyi	(substituted on) 46'
FW	17	Mohammadou Idrissou	(substituted on) 64'
MF	18	Eyong Enoh	(substituted on) 76'
Manager:
(France) Paul Le Guen

GK	1	Didier Ovono
DF	2	Georges Ambourouet
DF	5	Bruno Ecuele Manga
DF	19	Rodrigue Moundounga
DF	17	Moïse Brou Apanga
MF	14	Paul Kessany
MF	13	Bruno Zita Mbanangoyé		(substituted off) 64'
MF	18	Cédric Moubamba
MF	7	Stéphane N'Guéma	(yellow card) 68'
FW	23	Roguy Méyé	(yellow card) 77'	(substituted off) 77'
FW	8	Daniel Cousin
Substitutions:
MF	10	Étienne Alain Djissikadié		(substituted on) 68'
FW	9	Pierre-Emerick Aubameyang		(substituted on) 77'
Manager:
(France) Alain Giresse

== Zambia vs Tunisia ==
13 January 2010
19:30

Zambia	1–1	Tunisia
J. Mulenga 19'	Report	Dhaouadi 40'

Estádio Alto da Chela, Lubango
Attendance: 17,000
Referee: Koman Coulibaly (Mali)

GK	16	Kennedy Mweene
DF	4	Joseph Musonda
DF	6	Emmanuel Mbola
DF	19	Thomas Nyrienda
MF	15	Kampamba Chintu
MF	13	Stoppila Sunzu
MF	10	Felix Katongo
MF	17	Rainford Kalaba
MF	11	Christopher Katongo
FW	12	James Chamanga	(substituted off) 84'
FW	7	Jacob Mulenga
Substitutions:
FW	21	Emmanuel Mayuka	(substituted on) 84'
Manager:
(France) Hervé Renard

GK	16	Aymen Mathlouthi
DF	2	Khaled Souissi
DF	3	Karim Haggui	(yellow card) 74'
DF	18	Yassin Mikari
DF	5	Ammar Jemal
MF	6	Hocine Ragued
MF	8	Khaled Korbi
MF	10	Oussama Darragi		(substituted off) 62'
MF	15	Zouheir Dhaouadi
FW	9	Amine Chermiti		(substituted off) 81'
FW	19	Youssef Msakni
Substitutions:
FW	17	Issam Jemâa		(substituted on) 62'
FW	7	Chaouki Ben Saada		(substituted on) 81'
Manager:
Faouzi Benzarti

== Gabon vs Tunisia ==
17 January 2010
17:00

Gabon	0–0	Tunisia
	Report

Estádio Alto da Chela, Lubango
Attendance: 16,000
Referee: Coffi Codjia (Benin)

GK	1	Didier Ovono
DF	2	Georges Ambourouet
DF	5	Bruno Ecuele Manga
DF	19	Rodrigue Moundounga	(yellow card) 8'
DF	17	Moïse Brou Apanga
MF	14	Paul Kessany	(yellow card) 52'
MF	13	Bruno Zita Mbanangoyé
MF	7	Stéphane N'Guéma		(substituted off) 65'
FW	8	Daniel Cousin
FW	11	Eric Mouloungui		(substituted off) 78'
FW	9	Pierre-Emerick Aubameyang	(yellow card) 90'
Substitutions:
MF	10	Étienne Alain Djissikadié		(substituted on) 65'
FW	23	Roguy Méyé		(substituted on) 78'
Manager:
(France) Alain Giresse

GK	16	Aymen Mathlouthi
DF	11	Souheïl Ben Radhia	(yellow card) 35'
DF	3	Karim Haggui
DF	18	Yassin Mikari
DF	5	Ammar Jemal
MF	6	Hocine Ragued
MF	8	Khaled Korbi
MF	15	Zouheir Dhaouadi	(yellow card) 18'	(substituted off) 86'
FW	9	Amine Chermiti		(substituted off) 68'
FW	19	Youssef Msakni		(substituted off) 62'
FW	17	Issam Jemâa
Substitutions:
FW	7	Chaouki Ben Saada		(substituted on) 62'
FW	23	Ahmed Akaichi		(substituted on) 69'
FW	20	Mohamed Ali Nafkha		(substituted on) 86'
Manager:
Faouzi Benzarti

== Cameroon vs Zambia ==
17 January 2010
19:30

Cameroon	3–2	Zambia
Geremi 68'; Eto'o 72'; Idrissou 86'	Report	J. Mulenga 8'; C. Katongo 81' (pen.)

Estádio Alto da Chela, Lubango
Attendance: 15,000
Referee: Khalil Al Ghamdi (Saudi Arabia)

GK	1	Carlos Kameni	(yellow card) 81'
DF	4	Rigobert Song
DF	6	Alex Song
DF	3	Nicolas N'Koulou
DF	12	Henri Bedimo		(substituted off) 46'
MF	19	Stéphane Mbia	(yellow card) 15'	(substituted off) 46'
MF	8	Geremi Njitap
MF	11	Jean Makoun	(yellow card) 75'
MF	10	Achille Emana		(substituted off) 76'
FW	13	Somen Tchoyi
FW	9	Samuel Eto'o
Substitutions:
MF	2	Gilles Binya		(substituted on) 46'
FW	17	Mohammadou Idrissou		(substituted on) 64'
DF	5	Aurélien Chedjou		(substituted on) 76'
Manager:
(France) Paul Le Guen

GK	16	Kennedy Mweene
DF	4	Joseph Musonda		(substituted off) 76'
DF	6	Emmanuel Mbola
DF	19	Thomas Nyrienda
MF	15	Kampamba Chintu
MF	13	Stoppila Sunzu
MF	10	Felix Katongo		(substituted off) 62'
MF	17	Rainford Kalaba	(yellow card) 34'	(substituted off) 52'
MF	11	Christopher Katongo
FW	12	James Chamanga
FW	7	Jacob Mulenga
Substitutions:
DF	2	Francis Kasonde		(substituted on) 52'
MF	8	Isaac Chansa		(substituted on) 76'
FW	21	Emmanuel Mayuka		(substituted on) 76'
Manager:
(France) Hervé Renard

== Gabon vs Zambia ==
21 January 2010
17:00

Gabon	1–2	Zambia
F. Do Marcolino 83'	Report	Kalaba 28'; Chamanga 62'

Complexo da Sr. da Graça, Benguela
Attendance: 5,000
Referee: Mohamed Benouza (Algeria)

GK	1	Didier Ovono
DF	2	Georges Ambourouet
DF	5	Bruno Ecuele Manga
DF	19	Rodrigue Moundounga	(yellow card) 56'
DF	17	Moïse Brou Apanga
MF	14	Paul Kessany	(yellow card) 48'
MF	10	Étienne Alain Djissikadié		(substituted off) 78'
MF	13	Bruno Zita Mbanangoyé
FW	11	Éric Mouloungui
FW	23	Roguy Méyé		(substituted off) 61'
FW	8	Daniel Cousin	(yellow card) 28'
Substitutions:
FW	9	Pierre-Emerick Aubameyang		(substituted on) 61'
FW	20	Fabrice Do Marcolino		(substituted on) 78'
Manager:
(France) Alain Giresse

GK	16	Kennedy Mweene
DF	4	Joseph Musonda	(yellow card) 69'
DF	6	Emmanuel Mbola
DF	19	Thomas Nyrienda
MF	15	Kampamba Chintu	(yellow card) 9'
MF	13	Stoppila Sunzu
MF	10	Felix Katongo	(yellow card) 67'	(substituted off) 85'
MF	17	Rainford Kalaba	(yellow card) 16'	(substituted off) 63'
MF	11	Christopher Katongo
FW	12	James Chamanga
FW	7	Jacob Mulenga		(substituted off) 79'
Substitutions:
MF	20	William Njovu		(substituted on) 63'
MF	14	Noah Chivuta		(substituted on) 79'
DF	5	Hijani Himoonde		(substituted on) 85'
Manager:
(France) Hervé Renard

== Cameroon vs Tunisia ==
21 January 2010
17:00

Cameroon	2–2	Tunisia
Eto'o 47'; N'Guémo 64'	Report	Chermiti 1'; Chedjou 63' (o.g.)

Estádio Alto da Chela, Lubango
Attendance: 19,000
Referee: Noumandiez Désiré Doué (Ivory Coast)

GK	1	Carlos Kameni	(yellow card) 81'
DF	6	Alex Song
DF	2	Gilles Binya	(yellow card) 54'	(substituted off) 69'
DF	3	Nicolas N'Koulou
DF	5	Aurélien Chedjou
MF	7	Landry N'Guémo		(substituted off) 89'
MF	18	Eyong Enoh
MF	11	Jean Makoun		(substituted off) 46'
MF	20	Georges Mandjeck
FW	9	Samuel Eto'o	(yellow card) 68'
FW	17	Mohammadou Idrissou
Substitutions:
FW	15	Pierre Webó		(substituted on) 46'
DF	4	Rigobert Song		(substituted on) 64'
DF	23	André Bikey		(substituted on) 89'
Manager:
(France) Paul Le Guen

GK	16	Aymen Mathlouthi	(yellow card) 35'
DF	2	Khaled Souissi
DF	3	Karim Haggui
DF	18	Yassin Mikari
DF	5	Ammar Jemal	(yellow card) 83' (yellow-red card) 89'
MF	6	Hocine Ragued		(substituted off) 84'
MF	8	Khaled Korbi	(yellow card) 62'
MF	15	Zouheir Dhaouadi
FW	20	Mohamed Ali Nafkha	(yellow card) 28'	(substituted off) 52'
FW	17	Issam Jemâa	(yellow card) 7'
FW	9	Amine Chermiti		(substituted off) 81'
Substitutions:
FW	7	Chaouki Ben Saada		(substituted on) 52'
FW	23	Ahmed Akaichi		(substituted on) 81'
MF	14	Haitham Mrabet		(substituted on) 84'
Manager:
Faouzi Benzarti
