= List of French football transfers summer 2009 =

This is a list of French football transfers for the 2009 summer transfer window. The summer transfer window opened on 1 July 2009 and closed midnight on 1 September 2009. Only moves involving Ligue 1 and Ligue 2 clubs are listed. Players without a club may join one at any time, either during or in between transfer windows.

== Transfers ==
Date	Name	Moving from	Moving to	Fee
16 May 2009	(France) Anthony Ouasfane	(France) Toulouse	(France) Angers	Free
23 May 2009	(Brazil) Eduardo dos Santos	(France) Guingamp	(France) Lens	€3m
24 May 2009	(Gabon) Pierre-Emerick Aubameyang	(Italy) Milan	(France) Lille	Loan
25 May 2009	(France) Thomas Mienniel	(France) Clermont	(France) Angers	Free
26 May 2009	(Tunisia) Hamdi Kasraoui	(Tunisia) Espérance	(France) Lens	Free
28 May 2009	(France) Yoann Gourcuff	(Italy) Milan	(France) Bordeaux	€15m
28 May 2009	(Slovenia) Valter Birsa	(France) Sochaux	(France) Auxerre	Undisclosed
28 May 2009	(Republic of the Congo) Ladislas Douniama	(France) Orléans	(France) Lille	Undisclosed
30 May 2009	(Mali) Tenema N'Diaye	(France) Tours	(France) Nantes	Free
1 June 2009	(France) Gaëtan Charbonnier	(France) Paris Saint-Germain	(France) Amiens	Free
2 June 2009	(Guinea-Bissau) Bocundji Cá	(France) Tours	(France) Nancy	Undisclosed
2 June 2009	(Gabon) Fabrice Do Marcolino	(France) Angers	(France) Laval	Free
2 June 2009	(France) Adrien Regattin	(France) Sète	(France) Toulouse	Free
3 June 2009	(France) Jordan Lotiès	(France) Dijon	(France) Nancy	Free
3 June 2009	(France) Jérôme Lebouc	(France) Vannes	(France) Laval	Free
4 June 2009	(France) Maxime Baca	(France) Le Havre	(France) Lorient	Free
5 June 2009	(Cameroon) Dany Nounkeu	(France) Pau	(France) Toulouse	Undisclosed
5 June 2009	(France) Pierre Talmont	(France) Vannes	(France) Laval	Free
5 June 2009	(France) Alexandre Licata	(France) AS Monaco	(France) Auxerre	Free
6 June 2009	(Burkina Faso) Hamado Ouedraogo	(France) Beauvais	(France) Arles	Free
7 June 2009	(France) Romain Élie	(France) Gueugnon	(France) Arles	Free
7 June 2009	(France) Romain Raynaud	(France) Libourne-Saint-Seurin	(France) Arles	Free
8 June 2009	(Angola) Luís Delgado	(France) Metz	(France) Guingamp	Free
8 June 2009	(France) Sandy Paillot	(France) Lyon	(France) Grenoble	€2m
9 June 2009	(France) Abdel Jamaï	(France) Arles	(France) Gueugnon	Free
9 June 2009	(Morocco) Issam El Adoua	(Morocco) Wydad Casablanca	(France) Lens	Free
9 June 2009	(France) Christophe Aubanel	(France) Marseille	(France) Gazélec Ajaccio	Free
9 June 2009	(Ivory Coast) Ali Vanomo Bamba	(Ivory Coast) Société Omnisports	(France) Le Mans	Undisclosed
9 June 2009	(France) Eyemen Henaini	(France) Arles	(France) Sedan	Free
9 June 2009	(France) Pierrick Valdivia	(France) Lyon	(France) Sedan	Free
10 June 2009	(France) Steven Langil	(France) Auxerre	(France) Caen	Loan
10 June 2009	(Ghana) Jonathan Quartey	(South Africa) Kaizer Chiefs	(France) Nice	Free
10 June 2009	(Mali) Bakaye Traoré	(France) Amiens	(France) Nancy	Free
10 June 2009	(Senegal) Mustapha Diallo	(Senegal) ASC Diaraf	(France) Guingamp	Undisclosed
10 June 2009	(France) Thierry Argelier	(France) Créteil	(France) Guingamp	Free
10 June 2009	(France) Romain Pitau	(France) Sochaux	(France) Montpellier	Free
11 June 2009	(France) Jean-Jacques Mandrichi	(France) AC Ajaccio	(France) Nîmes	Free
11 June 2009	(Togo) Kossi Agassa	(France) Reims	(France) Istres	Loan
11 June 2009	(Tunisia) Fahid Ben Khalfallah	(France) Caen	(France) Valenciennes	Undisclosed
11 June 2009	(Democratic Republic of the Congo) Larrys Mabiala	(France) Paris Saint-Germain	(France) Nice	Free
11 June 2009	(France) Lynel Kitambala	(France) Auxerre	(France) Dijon	Loan
11 June 2009	(France) Maxime Jasse	(France) Auxerre	(France) Dijon	Loan
11 June 2009	(France) Cyril Jeunechamp	(France) Nice	(France) Montpellier	Free
12 June 2009	(France) Romain Armand	(France) Montpellier	(France) Clermont	Loan
12 June 2009	(France) Geoffrey Dernis	(France) Saint-Étienne	(France) Montpellier	Free
13 June 2009	(France) Stéphane Darbion	(France) AC Ajaccio	(France) Nantes	Free
15 June 2009	(France) Laurent Koscielny	(France) Tours	(France) Lorient	Free
15 June 2009	(France) David Sauget	(France) Saint-Étienne	(France) Grenoble	Free
16 June 2009	(France) Ousmane Coulibaly	(France) Guingamp	(France) Brest	Free
16 June 2009	(France) Antoine Devaux	(France) Boulogne	(France) Toulouse	Free
16 June 2009	(France) Thibault Giresse	(France) Amiens	(France) Guingamp	Free
16 June 2009	(France) Marvin Esor	(France) Bordeaux	(France) Arles	Free
16 June 2009	(France) Thomas Ayasse	(France) Cannes	(France) Arles	Free
16 June 2009	(Democratic Republic of the Congo) Yannick Yenga	(France) Paris FC	(France) Tours	Undisclosed
16 June 2009	(France) Abdoulaye Baldé	(France) Amiens	(France) Châteauroux	Free
16 June 2009	(France) Jérémie Roumegous	(France) Nîmes	(France) Châteauroux	Free
17 June 2009	(France) Yohann Lasimant	(France) Rennes	(France) Sedan	Loan
17 June 2009	(France) Ludovic Genest	(France) Auxerre	(France) Laval	Free
18 June 2009	(Mali) Djimi Traoré	(England) Portsmouth	(France) AS Monaco	Free
18 June 2009	(France) Benoît Costil	(France) Caen	(France) Sedan	Free
18 June 2009	(France) Laurent Agouazi	(France) Metz	(France) Boulogne	Free
18 June 2009	(France) Tongo Doumbia	(France) Châteauroux	(France) Rennes	Undisclosed
19 June 2009	(Japan) Junichi Inamoto	(Germany) Eintracht Frankfurt	(France) Rennes	Free
19 June 2009	(France) Kevin Das Neves	(France) Nantes	(France) Boulogne	Free
19 June 2009	(France) Reynald Lemaître	(France) Caen	(France) Nancy	€1m
22 June 2009	(Gabon) Didier Ovono	(Georgia (country)) Dinamo Tbilisi	(France) Le Mans	Undisclosed
22 June 2009	(France) Benedict Benvegnu	(France) Amiens	(France) Vannes	Free
22 June 2009	(Republic of the Congo) Francis N'Ganga	(France) Grenoble	(France) Tours	Free
22 June 2009	(France) Jody Viviani	(France) Saint-Étienne	(France) Grenoble	Undisclosed
22 June 2009	(South Korea) Lee Keun-Ho	(Japan) Júbilo Iwata	(France) Paris Saint-Germain	Undisclosed
23 June 2009	(Ivory Coast) Gérard Gnanhouan	(France) Fréjus	(France) Vannes	Free
23 June 2009	(France) Cédric Carrasso	(France) Toulouse	(France) Bordeaux	€8m
23 June 2009	(France) Jérémie Bréchet	(Netherlands) PSV	(France) Sochaux	€1m
24 June 2009	(France) Nolan Roux	(France) Lens	(France) Brest	Free
24 June 2009	(France) Ludovic Butelle	(Spain) Valencia	(France) Lille	Undisclosed
24 June 2009	(France) Guillaume Borne	(France) Rennes	(France) Boulogne	Free
24 June 2009	(Morocco) Salaheddine Sbai	(Belgium) Charleroi	(France) Nîmes	Free
24 June 2009	(France) Yohan Bocognano	(France) AC Ajaccio	(France) Nîmes	Free
24 June 2009	(Morocco) Abdelmounaïm El-Hajaoui	(France) Sète	(France) Nîmes	Free
24 June 2009	(France) Manassé Enza-Yamissi	(France) Nîmes	(France) Sochaux	Free
24 June 2009	(Bosnia and Herzegovina) Emir Spahić	(Russia) Lokomotiv Moscow	(France) Montpellier	Free
25 June 2009	(France) Ulrich Le Pen	(France) Lorient	(France) Laval	Free
25 June 2009	(France) Oumar Touré	(France) Nancy	(France) Dijon	Free
25 June 2009	(France) Yohann Rivière	(France) Guingamp	(France) Istres	Free
26 June 2009	(France) Mickaël Landreau	(France) Paris SG	(France) Lille	€2m
26 June 2009	(Brazil) Luan Louzã	(Brazil) São Caetano	(France) Toulouse	Undisclosed
26 June 2009	(France) Mickaël Poté	(France) Clermont	(France) Nice	Free
26 June 2009	(France) Michaël Isabey	(France) Sochaux	(France) Dijon	Free
26 June 2009	(France) Jérémy Sopalski	(France) Rodez	(France) Tours	Free
26 June 2009	(Japan) Daisuke Matsui	(France) Saint-Étienne	(France) Grenoble	Free
27 June 2009	(France) Rudy Haddad	(Israel) Maccabi Tel Aviv	(France) Châteauroux	Undisclosed
27 June 2009	(France) Frédéric Da Rocha	(France) Nantes	(France) Boulogne	Free
27 June 2009	(Nigeria) Olubayo Adefemi	(Austria) SCR Altach	(France) Boulogne	Free
27 June 2009	(France) Anthony Modeste	(France) Nice	(France) Angers	Loan
27 June 2009	(Tunisia) Karim Saidi	(Tunisia) Club Africain	(France) Tours	Undisclosed
27 June 2009	(France) Loïc Guillon	(France) Nantes	(France) Vannes	Free
27 June 2009	(Mali) Sigamary Diarra	(France) Tours	(France) Lorient	Free
27 June 2009	(France) Arnold Mvuemba	(England) Portsmouth	(France) Lorient	Loan
27 June 2009	(France) Cédric Liabeuf	(France) Guingamp	(France) Vannes	Free
27 June 2009	(Serbia) Miodrag Stošić	(Serbia) Vojvodina	(France) Nîmes	Free
28 June 2009	(France) Fabrice Begeorgi	(France) Marseille	(France) Istres	Free
28 June 2009	(France) Jean-François Rivière	(France) Angers	(France) AC Ajaccio	Free
28 June 2009	(France) Olivier Monterrubio	(Switzerland) Sion	(France) Lorient	Free
29 June 2009	(France) Yohann Pelé	(France) Le Mans	(France) Toulouse	Free
29 June 2009	(France) Grégory Coupet	(Spain) Atlético	(France) Paris Saint-Germain	€1m
29 June 2009	(Japan) Norio Suzuki	(Japan) Vissel Kobe	(France) Angers	Free
29 June 2009	(France) Vincent Planté	(France) Caen	(France) Saint-Étienne	Free
29 June 2009	(Portugal) Paulo Machado	(Portugal) Porto	(France) Toulouse	€3.5m
29 June 2009	(France) Geoffrey Adjet	(France) Nancy	(France) Tours	Free
29 June 2009	(France) Sébastien Piocelle	(Italy) Juve Stabia	(France) Arles	Free
30 June 2009	(France) Thomas Deruda	(France) Marseille	(France) AC Ajaccio	Free
30 June 2009	(Turkey) Mevlüt Erdinç	(France) Sochaux	(France) Paris Saint-Germain	€9m
30 June 2009	(France) Kévin Olimpa	(France) Bordeaux	(France) Angers	Loan
30 June 2009	(Cameroon) Eugène Ekobo	(France) Strasbourg	(France) Clermont	Free
30 June 2009	(Algeria) Ahmed Madouni	Qatar	(France) Clermont	Free
30 June 2009	(Argentina) Lucho Gonzalez	(Portugal) Porto	(France) Marseille	€18m
1 July 2009	(France) Christophe Coue	(France) Clermont	(France) Laval	Free
1 July 2009	(France) Thibaut Ferrand	(France) Le Mans	(France) Reims	Loan
1 July 2009	(France) Yoann Poulard	(France) Nantes	(France) AC Ajaccio	Free
1 July 2009	(France) Stéphane Auvray	(France) Vannes	(France) Nîmes	Free
1 July 2009	(Zimbabwe) Ovidi Caruro	(Zimbabwe) Masvingo United	(France) Boulogne	Free
1 July 2009	(France) Grégory Poirier	(France) Arles	(France) Nîmes	Free
2 July 2009	(Guinea) Ismaël Bangoura	(Ukraine) Dynamo Kyiv	(France) Rennes	€11m
2 July 2009	(France) Stéphane Pichot	(France) Sochaux	(France) Strasbourg	Free
2 July 2009	(Cameroon) Charley Fomen	(Cameroon) Panthère de Bangangté	(France) Marseille	Undisclosed
2 July 2009	(France) Edouard Cissé	(Turkey) Beşiktaş	(France) Marseille	Free
2 July 2009	(Senegal) Souleymane Diawara	(France) Bordeaux	(France) Marseille	€6m
2 July 2009	(France) Arthur Sorin	(Denmark) AGF Aarhus	(France) Sedan	Loan
2 July 2009	(Slovakia) Luboš Kamenár	(Slovakia) MFK Petržalka	(France) Nantes	Undisclosed
2 July 2009	(Cameroon) Patrick Ekeng-Ekeng	(Cameroon) Canon Yaoundé	(France) Le Mans	Undisclosed
3 July 2009	(Benin) Khaled Adenon	(France) Le Mans	(France) Bastia	Loan
3 July 2009	(France) Yacine Brahimi	(France) Rennes	(France) Clermont	Loan
3 July 2009	(France) Biagui Kamissoko	(France) Reims	(France) Vannes	Free
3 July 2009	(Serbia) Ivan Stevanović	(Serbia) FK Partizan	(France) Sochaux	€1m
3 July 2009	(South Korea) Tae-Hee Nam	(England) Reading	(France) Valenciennes	Undisclosed
4 July 2009	(France) Christophe Jallet	(France) Lorient	(France) Paris Saint-Germain	€2.5m
5 July 2009	(France) Grégory Tafforeau	(France) Lille	(France) Caen	Free
5 July 2009	(Croatia) Josip Tadić	(Croatia) Dinamo Zagreb	(France) Grenoble	€500k
6 July 2009	(France) Stéphane Borbiconi	(Turkey) Manisaspor	(France) Metz	Free
6 July 2009	(Argentina) Lisandro Lopez	(Portugal) Porto	(France) Lyon	€24m
8 July 2009	(France) Youcef Touati	(France) Pacy Vallée-d'Eure	(France) Dijon	Free
9 July 2009	(Czech Republic) Jaroslav Plašil	(Spain) Osasuna	(France) Bordeaux	Undisclosed
9 July 2009	(Cameroon) Stéphane M'Bia	(France) Rennes	(France) Marseille	€12m
10 July 2009	(Switzerland) Gelson Fernandes	(England) Manchester City	(France) Saint-Étienne	Undisclosed
10 July 2009	(France) Bakary Sako	(France) Châteauroux	(France) Saint-Étienne	Undisclosed
10 July 2009	(France) Alain Cantareil	(France) Lorient	(France) Nice	Free
11 July 2009	(France) Willy Grondin	(France) Valenciennes	(France) Paris Saint-Germain	Free
11 July 2009	(France) Bira Dembélé	(France) Rennes	(France) Boulogne	Undisclosed
11 July 2009	(Senegal) Rémi Gomis	(France) Caen	(France) Valenciennes	Undisclosed
13 July 2009	(France) Fabien Robert	(France) Lorient	(France) Boulogne	Loan
13 July 2009	(France) Cyril Rool	(France) Nice	(France) Marseille	Free
13 July 2009	(France) Florian Jarjat	(France) Dijon	(France) Nantes	Free
13 July 2009	(Gabon) Ernest Akouassaga	(Georgia (country)) Olimpi Rustavi	(France) Nantes	Free
13 July 2009	(France) Jérémy Pied	(France) Lyon	(France) Metz	Loan
14 July 2009	(France) Robin Previtali	(France) Sochaux	(France) Gueugnon	Free
14 July 2009	(France) Sébastien Puygrenier	(Russia) Zenit St. Petersburg	(France) AS Monaco	Loan
14 July 2009	(United States) Charlie Davies	(Sweden) Hammarby	(France) Sochaux	Undisclosed
15 July 2009	(France) Nicolas Haquin	(France) Guingamp	(France) Clermont	Undisclosed
15 July 2009	(Republic of the Congo) Oscar Ewolo	(France) Lorient	(France) Stade Brest	Free
16 July 2009	(Brazil) Michel Bastos	(France) Lille	(France) Lyon	€18m
16 July 2009	(Luxembourg) Mario Mutsch	(Switzerland) Aarau	(France) Metz	Free
16 July 2009	(Senegal) Leyti N'Diaye	(France) Marseille	(France) AC Ajaccio	Loan
16 July 2009	(France) Jean-Philippe Sabo	(France) Marseille	(France) AC Ajaccio	Loan
16 July 2009	(France) Damien Da Silva	(France) Niort	(France) Châteauroux	Free
16 July 2009	(Ivory Coast) Hassan Lingani	(France) Albi	(France) Bastia	Free
16 July 2009	(Morocco) Chakhir Belghazouani	(Ukraine) Dynamo Kyiv	(France) Tours	Loan
16 July 2009	(Brazil) Elinton Andrade	(Romania) Rapid București	(France) Marseille	€200k
17 July 2009	(Italy) Carlo Vecchione	(Italy) Juventus	(France) Clermont	Loan
17 July 2009	(France) Kaba Diawara	(Cyprus) Alki Larnaca	(France) Arles	Free
17 July 2009	(Brazil) Rodrigo Ramos	(Japan) Júbilo Iwata	(France) Strasbourg	Free
17 July 2009	(France) Fabrice Levrat	(France) Amiens	(France) Laval	Free
17 July 2009	(Ivory Coast) Kandia Traoré	(France) Sochaux	(France) Caen	Loan
18 July 2009	(France) Roy Contout	(France) Amiens	(France) Auxerre	Free
18 July 2009	(France) Aly Cissokho	(Portugal) Porto	(France) Lyon	€15m
20 July 2009	(France) Jean-Christophe Vergerolle	(France) Guingamp	(France) Arles	Free
20 July 2009	(France) Grégory Paisley	(France) Strasbourg	(France) Nice	Free
20 July 2009	(Algeria) Salim Arrache	(France) Marseille	(France) Bastia	Free
20 July 2009	(Algeria) Abdelmalek Cherrad	(France) Bastia	(France) Arles	Free
20 July 2009	(France) Maxime Le Marchand	(France) Rennes	(France) Le Havre	Loan
20 July 2009	(France) David Fleurival	(Belgium) Mons	(France) Châteauroux	Free
20 July 2009	(Togo) Floyd Ayité	(France) Bordeaux	(France) Nancy	Loan
20 July 2009	(Mali) Cheick Diabaté	(France) Bordeaux	(France) Nancy	Loan
20 July 2009	(France) Florian Marange	(France) Bordeaux	(France) Nancy	Free
21 July 2009	(Ivory Coast) Gervinho	(France) Le Mans	(France) Lille	€8m
21 July 2009	(France) Paul Lasne	(France) Bordeaux	(France) Bastia	Loan
21 July 2009	(France) Kévin Diaz	(France) AS Monaco	(France) AC Ajaccio	Loan
21 July 2009	(France) Sébastien Grax	(France) Saint-Étienne	(France) Guingamp	Loan
21 July 2009	(France) Virgile Reset	(Switzerland) Sion	(France) Vannes	Free
21 July 2009	(Morocco) Alharbi El-Jadeyaoui	(France) Brest	(France) Guingamp	Free
22 July 2009	(Tunisia) Saimy Barkallah	(Cyprus) Olympiakos Nicosia	(France) Istres	Free
22 July 2009	(Serbia) Danijel Ljuboja	(Germany) VfB Stuttgart	(France) Grenoble	Free
23 July 2009	(Senegal) Guirane N'Daw	(France) Nantes	(France) Saint-Étienne	Loan
24 July 2009	(Mali) Mamadou Bagayoko	(France) Nantes	(France) Nice	Free
24 July 2009	(Algeria) Foued Kadir	(France) Amiens	(France) Valenciennes	Free
24 July 2009	(France) Cyrille Merville	(France) Troyes	(France) Arles	Free
24 July 2009	(Democratic Republic of the Congo) Christian Kinkela	(France) Boulogne	(France) AC Ajaccio	Free
24 July 2009	(France) Mathieu Valverde	(France) Bordeaux	(France) Boulogne	Free
27 July 2009	(Brazil) Bruno Santos	(Brazil) Figueirense	(France) Châteauroux	Free
27 July 2009	(Spain) Fernando Morientes	(Spain) Valencia	(France) Marseille	Free
27 July 2009	(France) Fabrice Abriel	(France) Lorient	(France) Marseille	€2.5m
28 July 2009	(Republic of the Congo) Barel Mouko	(France) Gueugnon	(France) Lille	Free
28 July 2009	(Zambia) Jonas Sakahuwa	(Zambia) Zesco United	(France) Lorient	Undisclosed
29 July 2009	(France) Bafétimbi Gomis	(France) Saint-Étienne	(France) Lyon	€13m
29 July 2009	(France) Michael Ciani	(France) Lorient	(France) Bordeaux	€4m
29 July 2009	(France) James Fanchone	(France) Strasbourg	(France) Lorient	Free
29 July 2009	(Cameroon) Gaëtan Bong	(France) Metz	(France) Valenciennes	Free
30 July 2009	(Argentina) Gabriel Heinze	(Spain) Real Madrid	(France) Marseille	Undisclosed
31 July 2009	(Norway) Alexander Tettey	(Norway) Rosenborg	(France) Rennes	€5m
31 July 2009	(Republic of the Congo) Prince Oniangue	(France) Rennes	(France) Angers	Loan
31 July 2009	(France) Wilfried Moimbé	(France) Bordeaux	(France) AC Ajaccio	Loan
3 August 2009	(Portugal) João Paulo	(Portugal) Porto	(France) Le Mans	€1.5m
3 August 2009	(France) Abdoul Camara	(France) Rennes	(France) Vannes	Loan
4 August 2009	(Senegal) Omar Daf	(France) Sochaux	(France) Brest	Free
4 August 2009	(France) Lionel Mathis	(France) Sochaux	(France) Guingamp	Free
4 August 2009	(Canada) Haidar Al Shaibani	(Canada) Western Ontario Mustangs	(France) Nîmes	Free
4 August 2009	(Senegal) Sadio Sow	(Morocco) Kawkab Marrakech	(France) Nîmes	Free
4 August 2009	(Serbia) Vladimir Buac	(Serbia) Vojvodina	(France) Nîmes	Free
5 August 2009	(France) Mamadou Samassa	(France) Marseille	(France) Valenciennes	Loan
5 August 2009	(Argentina) Gabriel Penalba	(Argentina) Argentinos Juniors	(France) Lorient	€2m
5 August 2009	(France) Seïd Khiter	(France) Valenciennes	(France) Strasbourg	Loan
5 August 2009	(France) Nicolas Fauvergue	(France) Lille	(France) Strasbourg	Loan
5 August 2009	(Senegal) Massamba Sambou	(France) AS Monaco	(France) Nantes	Loan
5 August 2009	(France) Stephen Drouin	(France) Troyes	(France) Vannes	Free
6 August 2009	(France) Frédéric Biancalani	(France) Nancy	(France) Metz	Free
6 August 2009	(France) Jean-Claude Darcheville	(France) Valenciennes	(France) Nantes	Free
7 August 2009	(Brazil) Eduardo Costa	(Brazil) São Paulo	(France) AS Monaco	Undisclosed
7 August 2009	(France) Maurice Dalé	(France) Auxerre	(France) Arles	Free
10 August 2009	(Algeria) Sofyane Cherfa	(France) Sedan	(France) Châteauroux	Free
10 August 2009	(Democratic Republic of the Congo) Cédric Baseya	(France) Lille	(France) Le Havre	Loan
12 August 2009	(Cameroon) Guy N'dy Assembé	(France) Nantes	(France) Valenciennes	Loan
12 August 2009	(France) Andy Delort	Unattached	(France) Nîmes	Free
15 August 2009	(Democratic Republic of the Congo) Givestin N'Suki	(France) Lille	(France) Lorient	Free
15 August 2009	(France) Daniel Moreira	(France) Rennes	(France) Boulogne	Free
16 August 2009	(Morocco) Mustapha Allaoui	(Morocco) FAR Rabat	(France) Guingamp	Undisclosed
19 August 2009	(Argentina) Franco Sosa	(Argentina) Racing Club	(France) Lorient	€800k
19 August 2009	(France) Pierre Ducasse	(France) Bordeaux	(France) Lorient	Loan
20 August 2009	(Ivory Coast) Boubacar Sanogo	(Germany) Werder Bremen	(France) Saint-Étienne	€4m
20 August 2009	(France) Romain Dedola	(France) Lyon	(France) Strasbourg	Free
21 August 2009	(Angola) Kali	(Switzerland) Sion	(France) Arles	Free
24 August 2009	(Mali) Bakary Soumare	(United States) MLS (Chicago Fire)	(France) Boulogne	€1.5m
25 August 2009	(France) Grégory Wimbée	(France) Grenoble	(France) Valenciennes	Free
26 August 2009	(France) Lamine Gassama	(France) Lyon	(France) Strasbourg	Loan
28 August 2009	(Argentina) Gonzalo Bergessio	(Argentina) San Lorenzo	(France) Saint-Étienne	Undisclosed
28 August 2009	(Argentina) Augusto Fernández	(Argentina) River Plate	(France) Saint-Étienne	Loan
28 August 2009	(Senegal) Papa Malick Ba	(Romania) Dinamo București	(France) Nantes	Free
28 August 2009	(France) Kevin Anin	(France) Le Havre	(France) Sochaux	Free
30 August 2009	(France) Mathieu Coutadeur	(France) Le Mans	(France) AS Monaco	€4m
30 August 2009	(France) Aurélien Capoue	(France) Nantes	(France) Auxerre	Loan
31 August 2009	(Senegal) Badara Sène	(France) Sochaux	(France) Le Mans	Loan
31 August 2009	(Iceland) Eiður Guðjohnsen	(Spain) Barcelona	(France) AS Monaco	Undisclosed
31 August 2009	(Cameroon) Benjamin Moukandjo	(France) Rennes	(France) Nîmes	Free
31 August 2009	(Ghana) André Ayew	(France) Marseille	(France) Arles	Loan
31 August 2009	(France) Anthony Mounier	(France) Lyon	(France) Nice	€2.5m
31 August 2009	(France) Habib Bellaïd	(Germany) Eintracht Frankfurt	(France) Strasbourg	Loan
31 August 2009	(Ivory Coast) Franck Dja Djedje	(France) Strasbourg	(France) Vannes	Undisclosed
31 August 2009	(France) Djamel Bakar	(France) AS Monaco	(France) Nancy	Undisclosed
31 August 2009	(France) Benjamin Gavanon	(France) Nancy	(France) Sochaux	Loan
31 August 2009	(Portugal) Nuno Frechaut	(Portugal) Braga	(France) Metz	Free
31 August 2009	(France) Mame N'Diaye	(France) Boulogne	(France) Brest	Loan
31 August 2009	(France) Arnaud Maire	(France) Bastia	(France) Strasbourg	Free
31 August 2009	(Brazil) Gilmar	(Brazil) Náutico	(France) Guingamp	Undisclosed

- ^1 Player who signed with club before 1 July officially joined his new club on 1 July 2009, while player who joined after 1 July joined his new club following his signature of the contract.
