= 2010 FIFA World Cup qualification – CAF third round =

Football tournament qualification stage

This page provides the summaries of the CAF third round matches for the 2010 FIFA World Cup qualification. The 20 qualifiers (the 12 group winners and the best 8 runners-up from the second round) were split into five groups of four, in the draw held on 22 October 2008 in Zürich. Teams in each group will play a home-and-away round-robin in 2009, with the 5 groups winners advancing to the World Cup Finals in South Africa (together with hosts South Africa). (Note: South Africa also entered World Cup qualifying in order to qualify for the 2010 African Cup of Nations. Had they made it to this round, their matches would not have been counted in determining who would advance to the World Cup finals in their group.)

This round also doubles as the qualification stage for the 2010 African Cup of Nations, with the top three teams in each group qualifying for the finals (together with hosts Angola). (Note: Had Angola made it to this round, all the other three teams in their group would have advanced to the African Cup of Nations finals.)

== Seeding ==
Teams were seeded based on their FIFA World Rankings in October 2008 (number in parentheses). One team from each of the following pots was drawn into each group.

Pot 1	Pot 2	Pot 3	Pot 4
Cameroon (12); Egypt (22); Ghana (25); Nigeria (27); Ivory Coast (29)	Guinea (41); Morocco (43); Tunisia (47); Mali (53); Algeria (56)	Burkina Faso (63); Gabon (67); Zambia (70); Kenya (79); Benin (81)	Rwanda (87); Togo (91); Mozambique (100); Sudan (106); Malawi (109)

== Group A ==
Team	Pld	W	D	L	GF	GA	GD	Pts	Qualification	(Cameroon)	(Gabon)	(Togo)	(Morocco)
Cameroon	6	4	1	1	9	2	+7	13	Qualified for the 2010 FIFA World Cup and 2010 Africa Cup of Nations	—	2–1	3–0	0–0
Gabon	6	3	0	3	9	7	+2	9	Qualified for the 2010 Africa Cup of Nations	0–2	—	3–0	3–1
Togo	6	2	2	2	3	7	−4	8	Qualified for the 2010 Africa Cup of Nations	1–0	1–0	—	1–1
Morocco	6	0	3	3	3	8	−5	3		0–2	1–2	0–0	—

28 March 2009
16:00 UTC+0

Togo	1–0	Cameroon
Adebayor 11'	Report

Ohene Djan Stadium, Accra (Ghana) (Note: Togo were barred from hosting qualifiers due to violence during their 2008 African Cup of Nations qualifier against Mali.)
Attendance: 26,450
Referee: Essam Abdel-Fatah (Egypt)
28 March 2009
20:00 UTC+0

Morocco	1–2	Gabon
El Hamdaoui 83'	Report	P. Aubameyang 34'; Méyé 45'

Stade Mohammed V, Casablanca
Attendance: 38,000
Referee: Badara Diatta (Senegal)

6 June 2009
15:30 UTC+1

Gabon	3–0 Awarded (Note: FIFA awarded Gabon a 3–0 win as a result of Togo fielding the ineligible player Abdoul-Gafar Mamah who played for Togo despite being suspended even though the original score ended as the same scoreline to Gabon.)	Togo
Ecuele 11'; Méyé 67'; Brou 81'	Report

Stade Omar Bongo, Libreville
Attendance: 20,000
Referee: Verson Lwanja (Malawi)
7 June 2009
15:30 UTC+1

Cameroon	0–0	Morocco
	Report

Stade Omnisports Ahmadou Ahidjo, Yaoundé
Attendance: 35,000
Referee: Rajindraparsad Seechurn (Mauritius)

20 June 2009
18:00 UTC+0

Morocco	0–0	Togo
	Report

Stade Moulay Abdellah, Rabat
Attendance: 22,000
Referee: Wellington Kaoma (Zambia)

5 September 2009
15:30 UTC+1
(Note: The Gabon v Cameroon match was originally scheduled for 2009-06-20, but postponed at the request of Gabon for mourning the death of President Omar Bongo. The reverse match was also rescheduled.)

Gabon	0–2	Cameroon
	Report	Emaná 65'; Eto'o 67'

Stade Omar Bongo, Libreville
Attendance: 10,000
Referee: Alfred Ndinya (Kenya)
6 September 2009
15:30 UTC+0

Togo	1–1	Morocco
Salifou 3'	Report	Taarabt 90+2'

Stade de Kégué, Lomé
Attendance: 24,651
Referee: Muhmed Ssegonga (Uganda)

9 September 2009
15:30 UTC+1

Cameroon	2–1	Gabon
Makoun 25'; Eto'o 64'	Report	Cousin 90'

Stade Omnisports Ahmadou Ahidjo, Yaoundé
Attendance: 38,000
Referee: Kacem Bennaceur (Tunisia)

10 October 2009
15:30 UTC+1

Cameroon	3–0	Togo
Geremi 29'; Makoun 46'; Emaná 54'	Report

Stade Omnisports Ahmadou Ahidjo, Yaoundé
Attendance: 37,400
Referee: Wellington Kaoma (Zambia)
10 October 2009
15:30 UTC+1

Gabon	3–1	Morocco
Mahdoufi 43' (o.g.); Mouloungui 65'; Cousin 70'	Report	Taarabt 88'

Stade Omar Bongo, Libreville
Attendance: 14,000
Referee: Noumandiez Doué (Ivory Coast)

14 November 2009
15:30 UTC+0

Morocco	0–2	Cameroon
	Report	Webó 19'; Eto'o 52'

Fez Stadium, Fes
Attendance: 17,000
Referee: Daniel Bennett (South Africa)
14 November 2009
15:30 UTC+0

Togo	1–0	Gabon
Ayité 71'	Report

Stade de Kégué, Lomé
Attendance: 10,000
Referee: Rajindraparsad Seechurn (Mauritius)

== Group B ==
Team	Pld	W	D	L	GF	GA	GD	Pts	Qualification	(Nigeria)	(Tunisia)	(Mozambique)	(Kenya)
Nigeria	6	3	3	0	9	4	+5	12	Qualified for the 2010 FIFA World Cup and 2010 Africa Cup of Nations	—	2–2	1–0	3–0
Tunisia	6	3	2	1	7	4	+3	11	Qualified for the 2010 Africa Cup of Nations	0–0	—	2–0	1–0
Mozambique	6	2	1	3	3	5	−2	7	Qualified for the 2010 Africa Cup of Nations	0–0	1–0	—	1–0
Kenya	6	1	0	5	5	11	−6	3		2–3	1–2	2–1	—

28 March 2009
16:00 UTC+3

Kenya	1–2	Tunisia
Oliech 70'	Report	Jemal 6'; Jemâa 79'

Nyayo National Stadium, Nairobi
Attendance: 27,000
Referee: Divine Evehe (Cameroon)
29 March 2009
15:00 UTC+2

Mozambique	0–0	Nigeria
	Report

Estádio da Machava, Maputo
Attendance: 35,000
Referee: Amanuel Eyob (Eritrea)

6 June 2009
18:00 UTC+1

Tunisia	2–0	Mozambique
Ben Yahia 21' (pen.); Darragi 90+1'	Report

Stade 7 November, Tunis
Attendance: 30,000
Referee: Kokou Djaoupe (Togo)
7 June 2009
17:00 UTC+1

Nigeria	3–0	Kenya
I. Uche 2'; Obinna 72' (pen.), 77'	Report

Abuja Stadium, Abuja
Attendance: 60,000
Referee: Abdellah El Achiri (Morocco)

20 June 2009
16:00 UTC+3

Kenya	2–1	Mozambique
J. Owino 8'; Mariga 72' (pen.)	Report	Domingues 49'

Kasarani Sports Complex, Nairobi
Attendance: 15,000
Referee: Yakhouba Keita (Guinea)
20 June 2009
19:10 UTC+1

Tunisia	0–0	Nigeria
	Report

Stade 7 November, Tunis
Attendance: 45,000
Referee: Koman Coulibaly (Mali)

6 September 2009
15:00 UTC+2

Mozambique	1–0	Kenya
Tico-Tico 66'	Report

Estádio da Machava, Maputo
Attendance: 35,000
Referee: Koman Coulibaly (Mali)
6 September 2009
17:00 UTC+1

Nigeria	2–2	Tunisia
Odemwingie 23'; Eneramo 80'	Report	Taïder 24'; Darragi 89'

Abuja Stadium, Abuja
Attendance: 52,000
Referee: Daniel Bennett (South Africa)

11 October 2009
17:00 UTC+1

Nigeria	1–0	Mozambique
Obinna 90+3'	Report

Abuja Stadium, Abuja
Attendance: 13,000
Referee: Khalid Abdel Rahman (Sudan)
11 October 2009
17:00 UTC+1

Tunisia	1–0	Kenya
Jemâa 1'	Report

Stade 7 November, Tunis
Attendance: 50,000
Referee: Badara Diatta (Senegal)

14 November 2009
16:00 UTC+3

Kenya	2–3	Nigeria
Oliech 15'; Wanga 77'	Report	Martins 60', 81'; Yakubu 64'

Nyayo National Stadium, Nairobi
Attendance: 20,000
Referee: Eddy Maillet (Seychelles)
14 November 2009
15:00 UTC+2

Mozambique	1–0	Tunisia
Dário 83'	Report

Estádio da Machava, Maputo
Attendance: 30,000
Referee: Noumandiez Doué (Ivory Coast)

== Group C ==
Team	Pld	W	D	L	GF	GA	GD	Pts	Qualification	(Algeria)	(Egypt)	(Zambia)	(Rwanda)
Algeria	6	4	1	1	9	4	+5	13 (Note: Algeria and Egypt finished with identical overall and head-to-head records. Algeria won the tiebreaking play-off 1–0 to qualify for the 2010 FIFA World Cup.)	Qualified for the 2010 FIFA World Cup and 2010 Africa Cup of Nations	—	3–1	1–0	3–1
Egypt	6	4	1	1	9	4	+5	13	Qualified for the 2010 Africa Cup of Nations	2–0	—	1–1	3–0
Zambia	6	1	2	3	2	5	−3	5	Qualified for the 2010 Africa Cup of Nations	0–2	0–1	—	1–0
Rwanda	6	0	2	4	1	8	−7	2		0–0	0–1	0–0	—

Notes:
28 March 2009
15:30 UTC+2

Rwanda	0–0	Algeria
	Report

Stade Amahoro, Kigali
Attendance: 22,000
Referee: Coffi Codjia (Benin)
29 March 2009
19:30 UTC+2

Egypt	1–1	Zambia
Zaki 27'	Report	Kasonde 56'

Cairo International Stadium, Cairo
Attendance: 70,000
Referee: Koman Coulibaly (Mali)

6 June 2009
14:00 UTC+2

Zambia	1–0	Rwanda
Kalaba 78'	Report

Konkola Stadium, Chililabombwe
Attendance: 28,000
Referee: Cheikh Ahmed Tidane Seck (Senegal)
7 June 2009
20:30 UTC+1

Algeria	3–1	Egypt
Matmour 60'; Ghezzal 64'; Djebbour 77'	Report	Aboutrika 86'

Stade Mustapha Tchaker, Blida
Attendance: 26,500
Referee: Daniel Bennett (South Africa)

20 June 2009
14:00 UTC+2

Zambia	0–2	Algeria
	Report	Bougherra 21'; Saïfi 66'

Konkola Stadium, Chililabombwe
Attendance: 9,000
Referee: Divine Evehe (Cameroon)
5 July 2009
20:30 UTC+3
(Note: Moved from original date of the weekend of 2009-06-20 due to Egypt's participation in the 2009 FIFA Confederations Cup.)

Egypt	3–0	Rwanda
Aboutrika 64', 90'; Hosny 74' (pen.)	Report

Cairo Military Academy Stadium, Cairo
Attendance: 18,000
Referee: Emmanuel Imiere (Nigeria)

5 September 2009
15:30 UTC+2

Rwanda	0–1	Egypt
	Report	Hassan 67'

Stade Amahoro, Kigali
Attendance: 20,000
Referee: Joseph Lamptey (Ghana)
6 September 2009
22:00 UTC+1

Algeria	1–0	Zambia
Saïfi 59'	Report

Stade Mustapha Tchaker, Blida
Attendance: 30,000
Referee: Rajindraparsad Seechurn (Mauritius)

10 October 2009
14:00 UTC+2

Zambia	0–1	Egypt
	Report	Hosny 69'

Konkola Stadium, Chililabombwe
Attendance: 10,000
Referee: Kokou Djaoupe (Togo)
11 October 2009
19:15 UTC+1

Algeria	3–1	Rwanda
Ghezzal 22'; Belhadj 45+2'; Ziani 90+5' (pen.)	Report	Mutesa 19'

Stade Mustapha Tchaker, Blida
Attendance: 22,000
Referee: Yakhouba Keita (Guinea)

14 November 2009
15:30 UTC+2

Rwanda	0–0	Zambia
	Report

Stade Amahoro, Kigali
Attendance: 18,000
Referee: Jamel Ambaya (Libya)
14 November 2009
19:30 UTC+2

Egypt	2–0	Algeria
Zaki 3'; Moteab 90+5'	Report

Cairo International Stadium, Cairo
Attendance: 75,000
Referee: Jerome Damon (South Africa)

=== Tiebreaking play-off ===
18 November 2009
20:30 UTC+3

Egypt	0–1	Algeria
	Report	Yahia 40'

Al-Merrikh Stadium, Omdurman (Sudan)
Attendance: 35,000
Referee: Eddy Maillet (Seychelles)

Alleged crowd violence at the playoff and the preceding match led to diplomatic tension between Egypt and Algeria.

== Group D ==
Team	Pld	W	D	L	GF	GA	GD	Pts	Qualification	(Ghana)	(Benin)	(Mali)	(Sudan)
Ghana	6	4	1	1	9	3	+6	13	Qualified for the 2010 FIFA World Cup and 2010 Africa Cup of Nations	—	1–0	2–2	2–0
Benin	6	3	1	2	6	6	0	10	Qualified for the 2010 Africa Cup of Nations	1–0	—	1–1	1–0
Mali	6	2	3	1	8	7	+1	9	Qualified for the 2010 Africa Cup of Nations	0–2	3–1	—	1–0
Sudan	6	0	1	5	2	9	−7	1		0–2	1–2	1–1	—

28 March 2009
20:00 UTC+3

Sudan	1–1	Mali
Mudather Karika 23'	Report	Kanouté 19'

Al-Merrikh Stadium, Omdurman
Attendance: 35,000
Referee: Eddy Maillet (Seychelles)
29 March 2009
17:00 UTC+0

Ghana	1–0	Benin
Tagoe 1'	Report

Baba Yara Stadium, Kumasi
Attendance: 39,000
Referee: Daniel Bennett (South Africa)

7 June 2009
16:00 UTC+1

Benin	1–0	Sudan
Omotoyossi 22'	Report

Stade de l'Amitié, Cotonou
Attendance: 26,000
Referee: Kenias Marange (Zimbabwe)
7 June 2009
19:00 UTC+0

Mali	0–2	Ghana
	Report	Asamoah 67'; Amoah 79'

Stade 26 mars, Bamako
Attendance: 40,000
Referee: Divine Evehe (Cameroon)

20 June 2009
20:30 UTC+3

Sudan	0–2	Ghana
	Report	Amoah 6', 52'

Al-Merrikh Stadium, Omdurman
Attendance: 30,000
Referee: Jamel Ambaya (Libya)
21 June 2009
19:00 UTC+0

Mali	3–1	Benin
Maïga 29'; Diallo 76'; Kanouté 84'	Report	S. Tchomogo 15'

Stade 26 mars, Bamako
Attendance: 40,000
Referee: Essam Abdel-Fatah (Egypt)

6 September 2009
16:00 UTC+1

Benin	1–1	Mali
Aoudou 87'	Report	Samassa 72'

Stade de l'Amitié, Cotonou
Attendance: 33,000
Referee: Jerome Damon (South Africa)
6 September 2009
17:00 UTC+0

Ghana	2–0	Sudan
Muntari 14'; Essien 53'	Report

Ohene Djan Stadium, Accra
Attendance: 38,000
Referee: Essam Abdel-Fatah (Egypt)

11 October 2009
16:00 UTC+1

Benin	1–0	Ghana
Aoudou 89'	Report

Stade de l'Amitié, Cotonou
Attendance: 20,000
Referee: Verson Lwanja (Malawi)
11 October 2009
18:00 UTC+0

Mali	1–0	Sudan
Kanouté 89'	Report

Stade 26 mars, Bamako
Attendance: 15,000
Referee: Mohamed Benouza (Algeria)

14 November 2009
20:00 UTC+3

Sudan	1–2	Benin
Hassan Korongo 45+1' (pen.)	Report	Omotoyossi 34' (pen.); Koukou 62'

Al-Merrikh Stadium, Omdurman
Attendance: 600
Referee: Slim Jedidi (Tunisia)
15 November 2009
17:00 UTC+0

Ghana	2–2	Mali
Amoah 65'; Annan 83'	Report	Fané 23'; Ndiaye 68'

Baba Yara Stadium, Kumasi
Attendance: 39,000
Referee: Badara Diatta (Senegal)

== Group E ==
Team	Pld	W	D	L	GF	GA	GD	Pts	Qualification	(Ivory Coast)	(Burkina Faso)	(Malawi)	(Guinea)
Ivory Coast	6	5	1	0	19	4	+15	16	Qualified for the 2010 FIFA World Cup and 2010 Africa Cup of Nations	—	5–0	5–0	3–0
Burkina Faso	6	4	0	2	10	11	−1	12	Qualified for the 2010 Africa Cup of Nations	2–3	—	1–0	4–2
Malawi	6	1	1	4	4	11	−7	4	Qualified for the 2010 Africa Cup of Nations	1–1	0–1	—	2–1
Guinea	6	1	0	5	7	14	−7	3		1–2	1–2	2–1	—

28 March 2009
18:00 UTC+0

Burkina Faso	4–2	Guinea
Kéré 23'; Traoré 30'; Dagano 55' (pen.), 71'	Report	Feindouno 65' (pen.); Zayatte 86'

Stade du 4 Août, Ouagadougou
Attendance: 30,000
Referee: Mohamed Benouza (Algeria)
29 March 2009
17:00 UTC+0

Ivory Coast	5–0	Malawi
Romaric 1'; Drogba 6' (pen.), 27'; Kalou 59'; B. Koné 70'	Report

Stade Félix Houphouët-Boigny, Abidjan
Attendance: 34,000
Referee: Djamel Haimoudi (Algeria)
- 19 people were killed in a stampede before this match.

6 June 2009
14:30 UTC+2

Malawi	0–1	Burkina Faso
	Report	Dagano 68'

Kamuzu Stadium, Blantyre
Attendance: 25,000
Referee: Kacem Bennaceur (Tunisia)
7 June 2009
17:00 UTC+0

Guinea	1–2	Ivory Coast
S. Bangoura 65'	Report	B. Koné 44'; Romaric 72'

Stade 28 Septembre, Conakry
Attendance: 14,000
Referee: Essam Abdel-Fatah (Egypt)

20 June 2009
18:00 UTC+0

Burkina Faso	2–3	Ivory Coast
Pitroipa 27'; Bancé 78'	Report	Y. Touré 14'; Tall 54' (o.g.); Drogba 70'

Stade du 4 Août, Ouagadougou
Attendance: 33,056
Referee: Jerome Damon (South Africa)
21 June 2009
17:00 UTC+0

Guinea	2–1	Malawi
Feindouno 25', 43'	Report	Msowoya 88'

Stade 28 Septembre, Conakry
Attendance: 14,000
Referee: Khalid Abdel Rahman (Sudan)

5 September 2009
14:30 UTC+2

Malawi	2–1	Guinea
Msowoya 46', 59'	Report	Kalabane 38'

Kamuzu Stadium, Blantyre
Attendance: 15,000
Referee: Coffi Codjia (Benin)
5 September 2009
17:00 UTC+0

Ivory Coast	5–0	Burkina Faso
Panandétiguiri 12' (o.g.); Drogba 48', 65'; Y. Touré 55'; Keïta 68'	Report

Stade Félix Houphouët-Boigny, Abidjan
Attendance: 38,209
Referee: Eddy Maillet (Seychelles)

10 October 2009
14:30 UTC+2

Malawi	1–1	Ivory Coast
Ngwira 64'	Report	Drogba 67'

Kamuzu Stadium, Blantyre
Attendance: 25,000
Referee: Abdellah El Achiri (Morocco)
11 October 2009
17:00 UTC+0

Guinea	1–2	Burkina Faso
Bah 82'	Report	Dagano 37' (pen.); Bamogo 59'

Ohene Djan Stadium, Accra (Ghana) (Note: Due to security concerns arising from the 2009 Guinea protest, the match was moved to Accra, Ghana.)
Attendance: 5,000
Referee: Jamel Ambaya (Libya)

14 November 2009
16:00 UTC+0

Burkina Faso	1–0	Malawi
Dagano 47'	Report

Stade du 4 Août, Ouagadougou
Attendance: 20,000
Referee: Essam Abdel-Fatah (Egypt)
14 November 2009
16:00 UTC+0

Ivory Coast	3–0	Guinea
Gervinho 16', 31'; Tiéné 67'	Report

Stade Félix Houphouët-Boigny, Abidjan
Attendance: 28,000
Referee: Kenias Marange (Zimbabwe)

== Goalscorers ==
There were 135 goals scored in 61 matches, for an average of 2.21 goals per match.

6 goals

- (Ivory Coast) Didier Drogba

5 goals

- (Burkina Faso) Moumouni Dagano

4 goals

- (Ghana) Matthew Amoah

3 goals

- (Cameroon) Samuel Eto'o
- (Egypt) Mohamed Aboutrika
- (Guinea) Pascal Feindouno
- (Mali) Frédéric Kanouté
- (Malawi) Chiukepo Msowoya
- (Nigeria) Victor Obinna

2 goals

- (Algeria) Abdelkader Ghezzal
- (Algeria) Rafik Saïfi
- (Benin) Mohamed Aoudou
- (Benin) Razak Omotoyossi
- (Cameroon) Achille Emaná
- (Cameroon) Jean Makoun
- (Egypt) Hosny Abd Rabo
- (Egypt) Amr Zaki
- (Gabon) Daniel Cousin
- (Gabon) Roguy Méyé
- (Ivory Coast) Bakari Koné
- (Ivory Coast) Romaric
- (Ivory Coast) Yaya Touré
- (Ivory Coast) Gervinho
- (Kenya) Dennis Oliech
- (Morocco) Adel Taarabt
- (Nigeria) Obafemi Martins
- (Tunisia) Oussama Darragi
- (Tunisia) Issam Jemâa

1 goal

- (Algeria) Nadir Belhadj
- (Algeria) Madjid Bougherra
- (Algeria) Rafik Djebbour
- (Algeria) Karim Matmour
- (Algeria) Antar Yahia
- (Algeria) Karim Ziani
- (Benin) Séïdath Tchomogo
- (Benin) Romuald Boco
- (Burkina Faso) Aristide Bancé
- (Burkina Faso) Mahamoudou Kéré
- (Burkina Faso) Habib Bamogo
- (Burkina Faso) Jonathan Pitroipa
- (Burkina Faso) Alain Traoré
- (Cameroon) Geremi Njitap
- (Cameroon) Pierre Webó
- (Egypt) Ahmed Hassan
- (Egypt) Emad Moteab
- (Gabon) Bruno Ecuele Manga
- (Gabon) Éric Mouloungui
- (Gabon) Pierre-Emerick Aubameyang
- (Gabon) Moise Brou
- (Ghana) Anthony Annan
- (Ghana) Kwadwo Asamoah
- (Ghana) Michael Essien
- (Ghana) Sulley Muntari
- (Ghana) Prince Tagoe
- (Guinea) Mamadou Bah
- (Guinea) Sambégou Bangoura
- (Guinea) Oumar Kalabane
- (Guinea) Kamil Zayatte
- (Ivory Coast) Salomon Kalou
- (Ivory Coast) Kader Keïta
- (Ivory Coast) Siaka Tiéné
- (Kenya) McDonald Mariga
- (Kenya) Julius Owino
- (Kenya) Allan Wanga
- (Malawi) Jacob Ngwira
- (Mali) Mamadou Diallo
- (Mali) Lassane Fané
- (Mali) Modibo Maïga
- (Mali) Tenema Ndiaye
- (Mali) Mamadou Samassa
- (Morocco) Mounir El Hamdaoui
- (Mozambique) Domingues
- (Mozambique) Tico-Tico
- (Mozambique) Dário
- (Nigeria) Michael Eneramo
- (Nigeria) Peter Odemwingie
- (Nigeria) Ikechukwu Uche
- (Nigeria) Yakubu
- (Rwanda) Patrick Mutesa Mafisango
- (Sudan) Mudathir El Tahir
- (Sudan) Hassan Korongo
- (Togo) Emmanuel Adebayor
- (Togo) Moustapha Salifou
- (Togo) Floyd Ayité
- (Tunisia) Ammar Jemal
- (Tunisia) Nabil Taïder
- (Tunisia) Wissem Ben Yahia
- (Zambia) Rainford Kalaba
- (Zambia) Francis Kasonde

1 own goal

- (Burkina Faso) Mamadou Tall (against Ivory Coast)
- (Burkina Faso) Saïdou Panandétiguiri (against Ivory Coast)
- (Morocco) Hicham Mahdoufi (against Gabon)
