= Bekale =

Bekale or Békalé is a surname. Notable people with the surname include:

- Boris-Claude Nguéma Békalé (born 1984), Gabonese football goalkeeper
- Christ Bekale (born 1999), Gabonese football midfielder
- Julien Nkoghe Bekale (born 1962), Gabonese politician
