= Lamá =

Lamá may refer to:

- Lamá (footballer, born 1981), Angolan football goalkeeper Luís Maimona João
- Lamá (footballer, born 1985), Mozambican football goalkeeper Odimba Otshudi Lamá
