= Julius Owino =

Kenyan former footballer (born 1976)

Personal information
- Date of birth: 5 February 1976 (age 50)
- Place of birth: Kenya
- Position: Defender

Team information
- Current team: Gor Mahia (coach)

Senior career*
Years	Team	Apps	(Gls)
2003–2007	Gor Mahia		
2007–2009	Kingfisher East Bengal		
2009–2012	Gor Mahia		

International career
2004–2010	Kenya	19	(1)
- * Club domestic league appearances and goals

Julius Owino (born 5 February 1976) is a Kenyan former footballer who played as a defender. He played for Kenya at international level.

== Club career ==
Owino signed with Kenyan Premier League team Gor Mahia in 2003. He joined Kingfisher East Bengal FC of the I-League in 2007 before returning to Gor Mahia in 2009. He was dropped from the Gor Mahia squad in January 2012, but was given a role on the club's coaching staff.

== International career ==
He made his debut for the Kenya national team in 2004. His first goal for the team came in a 2–1 victory over Mozambique in a 2010 FIFA World Cup qualifier on 20 June 2009. He was chosen as captain for a game against Uganda in 2010.
