= Akimsola Boussari =

Togolese footballer

Akim Boussari
Personal information
- Full name: Akimsola Boussari
- Date of birth: March 10, 1988 (age 38)
- Place of birth: Sansanné-Mango, Togo
- Height: 1.94 m (6 ft 4 1/2 in)
- Position: Defender

Team information
- Current team: Warri Wolves F.C.
- Number: 5

Youth career
- Doumbé F.C.

Senior career*
Years	Team	Apps	(Gls)
2005–2008	AS Douanes		
2008–2010	Enugu Rangers		
2009	→ Difaa El Jadida (loan)		
2010–	Warri Wolves F.C.		

International career
2009–	Togo	1	(0)
- * Club domestic league appearances and goals

Akimsola Boussari (born 10 March 1988 in Sansanné-Mango) is a Togolese football footballer who currently plays for Warri Wolves F.C.

== Career ==
Boussari began his career with Doumbé FC and joined in summer 2005 to AS Douanes. On 1 July 2009 left AS Douanes and joined to Nigerian based club Enugu Rangers, after one month went on loan to Difaa El Jadida before returning to his club Enugu Rangers.

== International career ==
He was first called for Togo national football team on 10 June 2009 and played his first game on 20 June 2009 against Morocco.
