= Albino Cossa =

Mozambican footballer

Bino
Personal information
- Full name: Albino Ernesto Cossa
- Date of birth: 21 April 1982 (age 44)
- Place of birth: Maputo, Mozambique
- Height: 1.75 m (5 ft 9 in)
- Position: Goalkeeper

Team information
- Current team: Costa do Sol
- Number: 1

Senior career*
Years	Team	Apps	(Gls)
2002–2012	Liga Muçulmana		
2013–2015	Costa do Sol		

International career
2009–2010	Mozambique	9	(0)
- * Club domestic league appearances and goals

Albino Cossa or Bino (born 21 April 1982) is a Mozambican former professional footballer who played as a goalkeeper.

He started his professional career in 2002, joining Liga Muçulmana, where he played for 10 years. From 2013 to 2015, he played for Costa do Sol.

He represented Mozambique at the 2009 COSAFA Cup, and at the 2010 Africa Cup of Nations.
