= Allan Kamanga =

Malawian footballer

Personal information
- Full name: Allan Gilbert Kamanga Junior
- Date of birth: 29 December 1981 (age 44)
- Place of birth: Malawi
- Height: 1.80 m (5 ft 11 in)
- Position: Defender

Youth career
- 1996–2000: MDC United

Senior career*
Years	Team	Apps	(Gls)
2001	MDC United	9	(2)
2002–2005	MTL Wanderers	66	(1)
2005	Monomotapa United F.C.	12	(0)
2005–2006	Black Leopards	29	(0)
2006–2007	City Pillars	25	(1)
2007	Mpumalanga Black Aces	14	(0)
2007–2011	Dynamos	46	(4)

International career
1999–present	Malawi	34	(0)
- * Club domestic league appearances and goals

Allan Kamanga (born 29 December 1981) is a Malawian footballer who currently plays for Dynamos. In 2020, he retired from playing football

== International career ==
Kamanga is part of the Malawi national football team and represented his team at the 2010 African Cup of Nations.
