= Gérard Adanhoumé =

Beninese footballer

Personal information
- Full name: Gérard Adanhoumé
- Date of birth: 26 November 1986 (age 39)
- Place of birth: Cotonou, Benin
- Height: 1.84 m (6 ft 1/2 in)
- Position: Midfielder

Team information
- Current team: Soleil FC
- Number: 7

Youth career
- 2003–2007: Soleil FC

Senior career*
Years	Team	Apps	(Gls)
2008–	Soleil FC	33	(1)

International career
2010–	Benin	1	(0)
- * Club domestic league appearances and goals

Gérard Adanhoumé (born 26 November 1986 in Cotonou) is a Beninese football player who currently plays for Soleil FC.

== International career ==
Adanhoume presented the Benin national football team at the 2010 Africa Cup of Nations in Angola.
