= Zé Luís (footballer, born 1989) =

Mozambican footballer

Zé Luis
Personal information
- Full name: Luis de Sousa Pereira Vaz
- Date of birth: 28 May 1989 (age 37)
- Place of birth: Mozambique
- Height: 1.73 m (5 ft 8 in)
- Position: Midfielder

Youth career
- 2007–2008: Al Ahly

Senior career*
| Years | Team | Apps | (Gls) |
| 2008–2011 | El Baladeya | | |
| 2012–2014 | Liga Muçulmana | | |
| 2014–2015 | União Madeira | 23 | (0) |

International career^{‡}
| 2008– | Mozambique | 10 | (0) |
- * Club domestic league appearances and goals as of 25 May 2015 ‡ National team caps and goals as of 20 June 2015

Luis de Sousa Pereira Vaz (born 28 May 1989), known as Zé Luis, is a Mozambican footballer who plays as a midfielder.
