= Simplex Nthala =

Malawian footballer

Personal information
- Date of birth: 24 February 1988 (age 38)
- Place of birth: Blantyre, Malawi
- Height: 1.79 m (5 ft 10 1/2 in)
- Position: Goalkeeper

Team information
- Current team: GD Maputo

Senior career*
Years	Team	Apps	(Gls)
2008–2011	MTL Wanderers		
2011–2012	Liga Muçulmana		
2012	Vilankulo		
2013	Ferroviário de Nampula		
2014–2016	CD Maxaquene		
2017–2018	Ferroviário de Maputo		
2019–	GD Maputo		

International career^{‡}
2009–2015	Malawi	31	(0)
- * Club domestic league appearances and goals as of 7 August 2021 ‡ National team caps and goals as of 7 August 2021

Simplex Nthala (born 24 February 1988) is a Malawian footballer, who currently plays for GD Maputo in Mozambique.

== International career ==
He played only one game for the Malawi national football team before being nominated for the 2010 African Cup of Nations in Angola. So far, he has collected 20 caps for national team.
