= Mouftaou Adou =

Beninese football player

Personal information
- Full name: Mouftaou Adoun
- Date of birth: 10 April 1991 (age 35)
- Place of birth: Cotonou, Benin
- Height: 1.65 m (5 ft 5 in)
- Position: Defender

Team information
- Current team: Port Autonome
- Number: 5

Youth career
- 2004–2007: ASPAC Cotonou

Senior career*
Years	Team	Apps	(Gls)
2008–2009	ASPAC Cotonou	19	(0)
2010–	Port Autonome		

International career
2010–	Benin	3	(0)
- * Club domestic league appearances and goals

Mouftaou Adoun (born 10 April 1991, in Cotonou) is a Beninese football player who currently plays in Benin for Port Autonome.

== Career ==
Adou began his career with ASPAC Cotonou and joined after the 2010 African Cup of Nations in February 2010 to Benin Premier League club Port Autonome-ASPAC. He was in February 2010 on trial and would sign with SK Sturm Graz, but his club Port Autonome denied the player this movement.

== International career ==
Adoun was part of the Benin national football team at 2010 African Cup of Nations in Angola.
