= Daniel Cousin =

Gabonese footballer (born 1977)

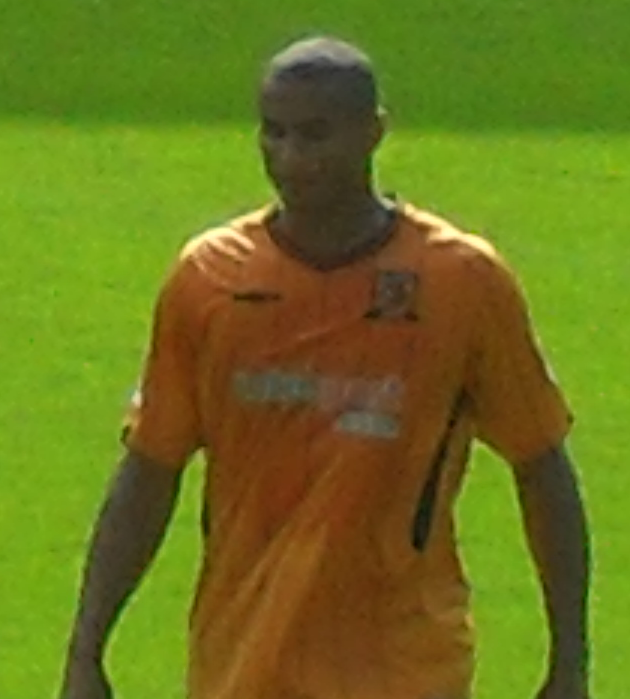
- Cousin in 2009

Personal information
- Full name: Daniel Michel Cousin
- Date of birth: 7 February 1977 (age 49)
- Place of birth: Libreville, Gabon
- Height: 1.86 m (6 ft 1 in)
- Position: Striker

Senior career*
Years	Team	Apps	(Gls)
1997–1998	Martigues	36	(5)
1998–2000	Chamois Niortais	46	(5)
2000–2004	Le Mans	129	(44)
2004–2007	Lens	101	(26)
2007–2008	Rangers	28	(11)
2008–2010	Hull City	31	(4)
2010	→ AEL (loan)	9	(2)
2010–2011	AEL	27	(6)
2011–2014	Sapins		
Total		420	(114)

International career
2000–2014	Gabon	56	(13)

Managerial career
- 2014–2018: Gabon (general manager)
- 2018–2019: Gabon
- 2019: ES Fos-sur-Mer
- 2020–2022: FC Côte Bleue (staff)
- * Club domestic league appearances and goals

Daniel Michel Cousin (born 7 February 1977) is a Gabonese former professional footballer who played as a striker.

He played for Martigues, Chamois Niortais, Le Mans Union Club 72, RC Lens, Rangers, Hull City, AEL and Sapins, as well as the Gabon national team.

In March 2019, Cousin formally signed a contract to serve as a coach of Gabon national team despite being confirmed in September 2018, but left a few weeks later before being appointed manager of French club ES Fos-sur-Mer.

== Early life ==
Born in Libreville, Estuaire Province, Cousin (pronounced [kuzɛ̃]) moved to Marseille, France, when he was three.

== Club career ==
=== France ===
Cousin played in the lower leagues in France for Martigues and Niort before moving to Le Mans Union Club 72.

He joined Lens in the summer of 2004. Whilst at Lens he appeared in the UEFA Cup in both 2005–06 and 2006–07 starting 13 games with 2 appearances as a substitute netting 8 goals in the process. Lens qualified for the 2005–06 tournament after triumphing in the UEFA Intertoto Cup competition with Cousin starting in five games, making three substitute appearances and scoring three goals including one in the final itself versus CFR Cluj of Romania.

=== Rangers ===
On 9 August 2007, Cousin arrived at Murray Park in Glasgow to hold contract talks over a move and signed a three-year deal for a reported fee of £750,000. He scored his first goal for Rangers on his debut in a 2–0 home league win against St Mirren on 11 August 2007, and scored twice on his first start a week later against Falkirk.

Cousin played at Ibrox, against Lyon in the UEFA Champions League on 12 December 2007. Rangers lost 3–0 with Cousin playing the first half before getting substituted for Steven Naismith in that game. In November 2007 he was linked with a transfer away from Rangers, and it was reported that he had a release clause in his current contract which means he could leave in January 2008. This was denied by Rangers but the club did reveal there was a £3 million release clause during the 2008 summer transfer window.

On 21 January 2008, it was reported that Premier League side Fulham had had a £2 million bid rejected by Rangers manager Walter Smith. The next day a bid of £3 million from Fulham activated a release clause, however FIFA regulations meant Cousin required special dispensation to complete the move. On 29 January, the transfer was cancelled as FIFA did not grant permission but it later emerged that FIFA had not reached a decision over the transfer. On 29 February, FIFA announced it would not allow the deal to be completed.

On 1 May 2008, Cousin was sent off during extra time of the Fiorentina v Rangers UEFA Cup semi-final second leg match for a headbutt. Despite Cousin's sending off, Rangers progressed to win the game on penalties. A matter of days later, he did the same to Dundee United defender Lee Wilkie, in a 3–1 win mired in refereeing controversy. Although he was not sent off, Cousin was widely criticised for his stupidity. On 31 August, Cousin scored the opening goal in the first Old Firm match of the season. Rangers went on to win the match 4–2 and he was later sent off for two bookable offences. This was the player's final game for Rangers, but Rangers' then-assistant manager Ally McCoist said: "That was as good a centre-forward performance in an Old Firm game as I've ever seen from anybody. That particular day he was phenomenal."

=== Hull City ===
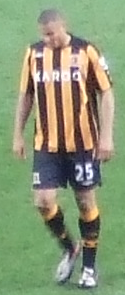
Cousin playing for Hull City in 2009

On 1 September 2008, Cousin signed for Premier League side Hull City on a three-year deal for an undisclosed fee. Cousin scored his first Hull goal against Arsenal at the Emirates Stadium on 27 September 2008. His header was the decisive goal and helped to exalt Hull City to a historic 2–1 victory against Arsenal at their home. He scored in a 4–3 defeat to Manchester United at Old Trafford before scoring again at home to Manchester City. On 1 September 2009, a loan deal to Premier League rivals Burnley fell through. In total, Cousin scored five goals in 33 matches for the Tigers.

=== AEL ===
Cousin joined the Greek side AEL on loan for the second half of the 2009–10 season. He was the second player from Gabon to play for Larissa after Henry Antchouet. The transfer was made permanent on 18 August 2010. Despite a good performance the following season, Larissa were relegated from the top tier, and he left the club.

=== Sapins ===
On 13 October 2011, Cousin returned home to Gabon to play for local team Sapins FC in an attempt to boost his chances of playing at the 2012 Africa Cup of Nations. The deal with Sapins allowed the striker to leave without any conditions if he received an offer from a club in Europe. Cousin was released by Sapins on 31 January 2012. Cousin agreed personal terms to rejoin Rangers until the end of the season, but Rangers entered administration and had a transfer embargo applied by the Scottish Premier League. When Rangers attempted to register Cousin with the league, their application was rejected.

== International career ==
Cousin made his debut for the Gabon national team on 6 January 2000 in a friendly match against Egypt. That same year, he participated in the 2000 Africa Cup of Nations, appearing in all three of Gabon's group-stage matches. He scored his first international goal on 22 April 2000 in a 2002 FIFA World Cup African qualifier against the Madagascar.

After stepping away from international football for several years from 2002, Cousin returned to the national team in 2006 following persuasion from manager Alain Giresse. On 2 September of that year, he scored against Madagascar in a 2008 Africa Cup of Nations qualifier, helping Gabon secure a 4–0 victory. He subsequently served as captain and helped Gabon compete for qualification during the 2010 FIFA World Cup African qualifiers.

Cousin also participated in the 2010 Africa Cup of Nations. On 13 January 2010, he scored the winning goal in Gabon's opening group-stage match against the Cameroon, securing a 1–0 victory. Gabon were subsequently eliminated in the group stage.

In 2012, Cousin participated in the 2012 Africa Cup of Nations, co-hosted by Gabon and Equatorial Guinea. He appeared in the group-stage matches against the Niger, the Morocco and the Tunisia. Against Morocco, he scored a goal to help Gabon secure a 3–2 victory. Gabon were eliminated in the quarter-finals after drawing 1–1 with the Mali and subsequently losing in the penalty shoot-out.

Cousin also participated in the 2014 African Nations Championship. His final appearance for the national team came on 26 January 2014, in a quarter-final match against the Libya.

== Managerial career ==
On 4 September 2014, Cousin was named general manager of the Gabon national team. In September 2018, he became manager of the Gabon national team. He left in March 2019.

On 20 May 2019, Cousin was appointed manager of French club ES Fos-sur-Mer. He was sacked on 30 September 2019.

In June 2020, Cousin joined the technical staff of FC Côte Bleue, where he would be in charge of the attacking section of the U18 to the senior reserve of the French club.

== Career statistics ==
=== International goals ===
Scores and results list Gabon's goal tally first, score column indicates score after each Cousin goal.

List of international goals scored by Daniel Cousin
No.	Date	Venue	Opponent	Score	Result	Competition
1	22 April 2000	Stade Omar Bongo, Libreville, Gabon	Madagascar	1–0	1–0	2002 FIFA World Cup qualification
2	25 June 2000	Stade Omar Bongo, Libreville, Gabon	Congo	2–?	2–3	Friendly
3	2 June 2001	Stade Omar Bongo, Libreville, Gabon	Tunisia	1–0	1–1	2002 Africa Cup of Nations qualification
4	2 September 2006	Stade Omar Bongo, Libreville, Gabon	Madagascar	2–0	4–0	2008 Africa Cup of Nations qualification
5	9 September 2009	Stade Ahmadou Ahidjo, Yaoundé, Cameroon	Cameroon	1–2	1–2	2010 FIFA World Cup qualification
6	10 October 2009	Stade Omar Bongo, Libreville, Gabon	Morocco	3–0	3–1	2010 FIFA World Cup qualification
7	6 January 2010	Free State Stadium, Bloemfontein, South Africa	Mozambique	2–0	2–0	Friendly
8	13 January 2010	Estádio Nacional da Tundavala, Lubango, Angola	Cameroon	1–0	1–0	2010 Africa Cup of Nations
9	11 August 2010	July 5, 1962 Stadium, Algiers, Algeria	Algeria	1–0	2–1	Friendly
10	9 February 2011	Stade Aimé Bergeal, Paris, France	Mozambique	2–0	2–0	Friendly
11	27 January 2012	Stade d'Angondjé, Libreville, Gabon	Morocco	2–1	3–2	2012 Africa Cup of Nations
12	8 September 2012	Stade de l'Amitié, Cotonou, Benin	Togo	1–0	1–1	2013 Africa Cup of Nations qualification
13	26 January 2014	Peter Mokaba Stadium, Polokwane, South Africa	Libya	1–1	1–1 (2–4 pen.)	2014 African Nations Championship

== Honours ==
Lens

- UEFA Intertoto Cup: 2005
