= Anthony Ouasfane =

French footballer (born 1989)

Personal information
- Full name: Anthony Ouasfane
- Date of birth: 29 May 1989 (age 37)
- Place of birth: Marseille, France
- Height: 1.92 m (6 ft 4 in)
- Position: Defender

Team information
- Current team: Toulon
- Number: 4

Youth career
- 2005–2009: Toulouse

Senior career*
Years	Team	Apps	(Gls)
2009–2012	Angers	9	(0)
2012–2013	Marseille Consolat	9	(1)
2013	JS Kabylie	0	(0)
2014–	Toulon	139	(8)
2017	Toulon B	1	(0)
- * Club domestic league appearances and goals as of 05:54, 4 May 2022 (UTC)

Anthony Ouasfane (born 29 May 1989) is a French professional footballer who plays as a defender for Championnat National 1 club Toulon, where he is the captain.

== Club career ==
After playing for three different neighborhood clubs in Marseille, Ouasfane received offers from local side Marseille, and Toulouse. He chose Toulouse saying that "joining Marseille at such a young age scared [him] a little". With Toulouse, he became captain of the reserve side, even making a few appearances on the substitutes bench for the first team but failing to make any appearances.

On 16 May 2009, Ouasfane signed a three-year contract with Ligue 2 side Angers. On 21 August 2009, he made his professional debut, coming on as a substitute for Sébastien Renouard in the 60th minute of the Ligue 2 match against Le Havre.

On 17 July 2010, Ouasfane went on trial with English Championship side Crystal Palace. During his trial, he started in a pre-season friendly against Chelsea.

== International career ==
On 9 August 2009, Algeria U23 national team's head coach Abdelhak Benchikha called up Ouasfane for the first time for a six-day training camp in Blida, Algeria. The camp was capped off with a friendly against local side USM Blida. He received further call-ups the following months for camps in Alger and Marseille.
