= Paul Kessany =

Gabonese footballer (born 1985)

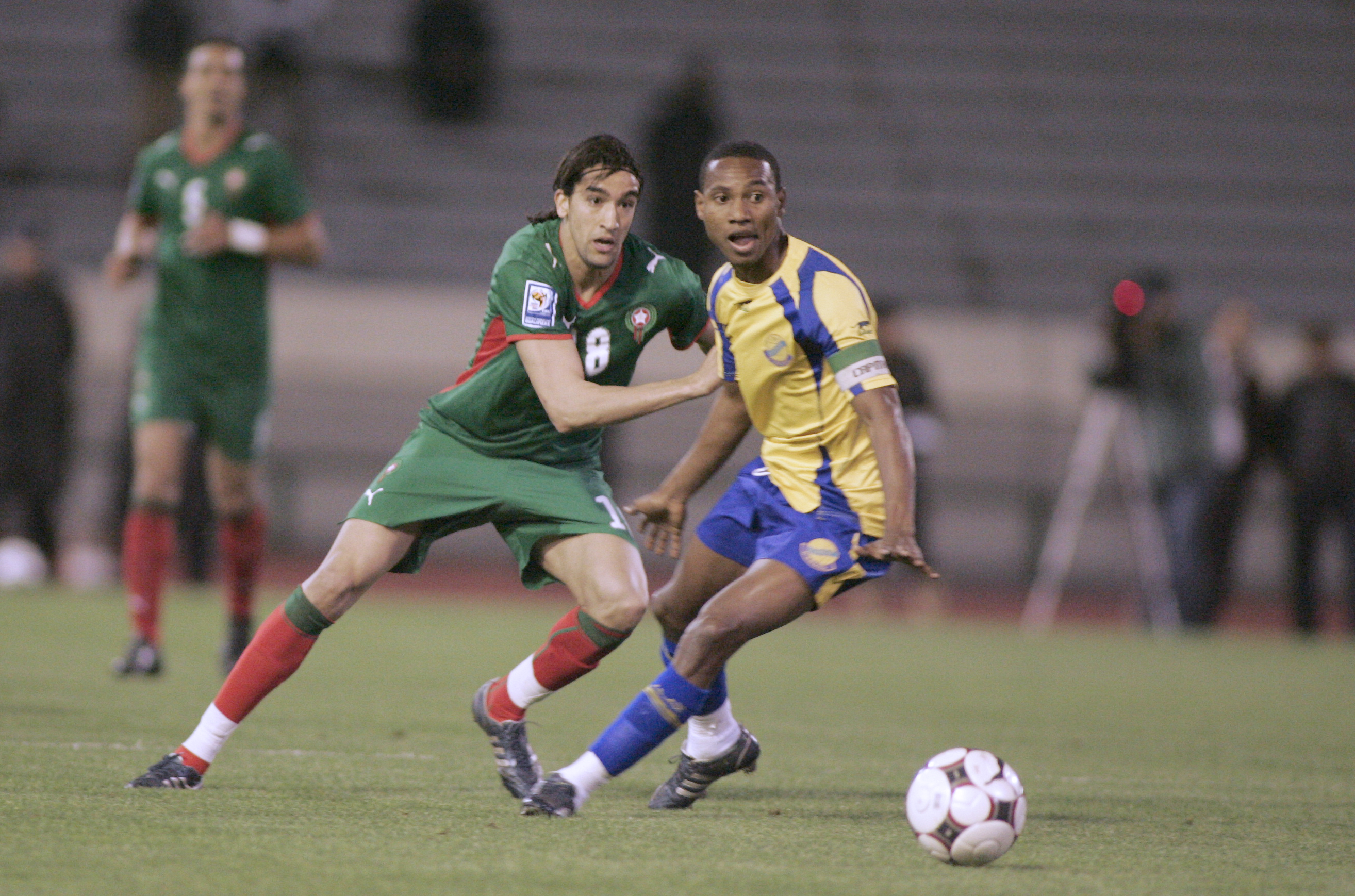

Personal information
- Full name: Ulrich Kessany Zategwa
- Date of birth: 16 March 1985 (age 41)
- Place of birth: Lambaréné, Gabon
- Height: 1.77 m (5 ft 10 in)
- Position: Defensive midfielder

Senior career*
Years	Team	Apps	(Gls)
1998–1999	AO Evizo		
1999–2005	USM Libreville		
2006	FC 105 Libreville		
2007	UE Rubí		
2007–2008	FC Zestaponi	29	(3)
2009	Ironi Kiryat Shmona	13	(0)
2009–2011	Istres	46	(0)
2011–2012	Hapoel Ramat Gan	23	(1)
2012–2013	AS Mangasport		
2013–2014	O'MbiliaNzami Libreville		
2015	FC 105 Libreville		

International career
2002–2013	Gabon	50	(0)
- * Club domestic league appearances and goals

Ulrich Kessany Zategwa (born 16 March 1985 in Lambaréné), known as Paul Kessany, is a Gabonese former footballer who played as a defensive midfielder.

== Honours ==
- Georgian Cup (1):
  - 2007–08
