= Ernest Akouassaga =

Gabonese football defender

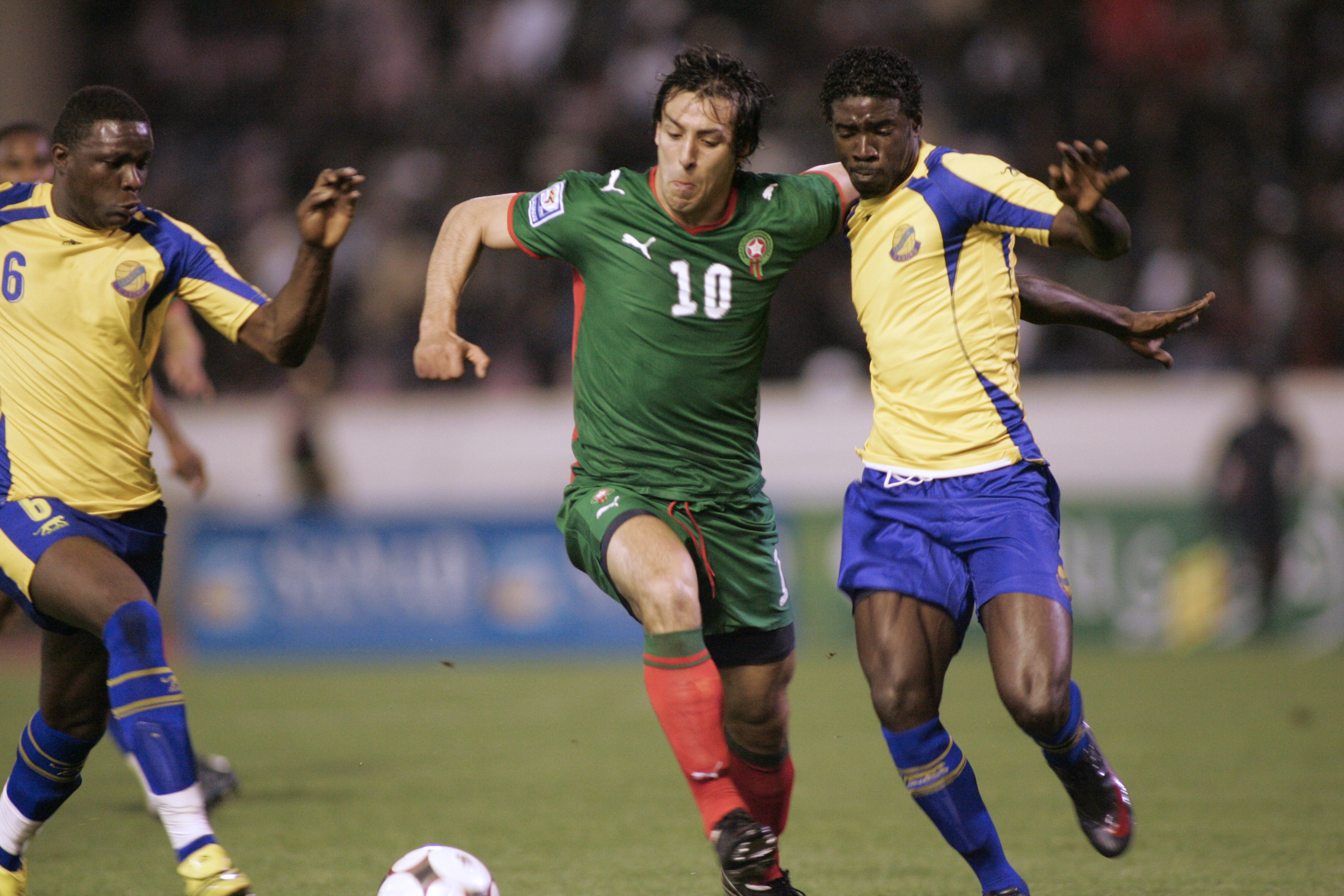
- Akouassaga (right) with Moroccan player Mounir El Hamdaoui

Personal information
- Date of birth: 16 September 1985 (age 41)
- Place of birth: Leconi, Gabon
- Height: 1.78 m (5 ft 10 in)
- Position: Left back

Senior career*
Years	Team	Apps	(Gls)
2002–2003	AS Mangasport		
2003–2006	SCO Angers	18	(4)
2006–2007	Le Havre B	18	(0)
2007–2008	FC Zestaponi	6	(0)
2008–2009	FC Olimpi Rustavi	34	(3)
2009–2011	FC Nantes	7	(0)

International career
20042009	Gabon	14	(0)
- * Club domestic league appearances and goals as of 2 September 2008

Ernest Akouassaga (born 16 September 1985) is a Gabonese football defender.

== Career ==
Akoussaga began his career with AS Mangasport and joined in summer 2003 to French club SCO Angers. He played in three years SCO Angers just nine games, who scores four goals and signed in summer 2006 a contract with Le Havre AC. Akoussaga played only eighteen games for the reserve by Le Havre AC and was transferred in summer 2007 to FC Olimpi Rustavi. After two years in the Umaglesi Liga with Rustavi, turned back to France and signed on 13 July 2009 a contract with FC Nantes.

== International career ==
Akoussaga is a member of the Gabon national football team.
