= Lamá (footballer, born 1985) =

Mozambican footballer

Personal information
- Full name: Odimba Otshudi Lamá
- Date of birth: 15 January 1985 (age 41)
- Place of birth: Mozambique
- Position: Goalkeeper

Team information
- Current team: Ferroviário de Maputo

Senior career*
Years	Team	Apps	(Gls)
2005–2009	Liga Muçulmana		
2010–2012	Costa do Sol		
2013–	Estrela Vermelha		

International career
2010–2011	Mozambique	2	(0)
- * Club domestic league appearances and goals

Odimba Otshudi Lamá (born 15 January 1985) better known as Lamá is a Mozambican goalkeeper with the Mozambique national football team.

He was called up for the 2010 African Cup of Nations tournament.
