= Jacob Ngwira =

Malawian footballer

Personal information
- Full name: Jacob Ngwira
- Date of birth: 17 September 1985 (age 41)
- Place of birth: Malawi
- Position: Midfielder

Team information
- Current team: Karonga United FC
- Number: 17

Youth career
- Super ESCOM

Senior career*
Years	Team	Apps	(Gls)
2005–2009	Super ESCOM	?	(?)
2009–2012	Carara Kicks	?	(?)
2012–2014	ESCOM United	0	(0)
2014–	Karonga United FC		

International career
2007–	Malawi	16+	(1+)
- * Club domestic league appearances and goals

Jacob Ngwira (born 17 September 1985) is a Malawian footballer who currently plays for Karonga United FC.

== Career ==
He played previously for South African side Carara Kicks, and Malawian clubs Super ESCOM and ESCOM United in the TNM Super League.

== International career ==
He is member of the Malawi national football team and played at the 2010 African Cup of Nations.
