= Boris-Claude Nguéma Békalé =

Gabonese footballer

Boris-Claude Nguéma Békalé (born 7 December 1984) is a Gabonese footballer who plays goalkeeper for USM Libreville and the Gabon national football team. Békalé was born in the Kango district. In the past he has also played for FC 105 Libreville, Delta Téléstar, and Tout Puissant Akwembe.

He was a reserve goalkeeper for Gabon at the 2010 Africa Cup of Nations finals in Angola.
