= Guy Ndy Assembé =

Cameroonian footballer (born 1986)

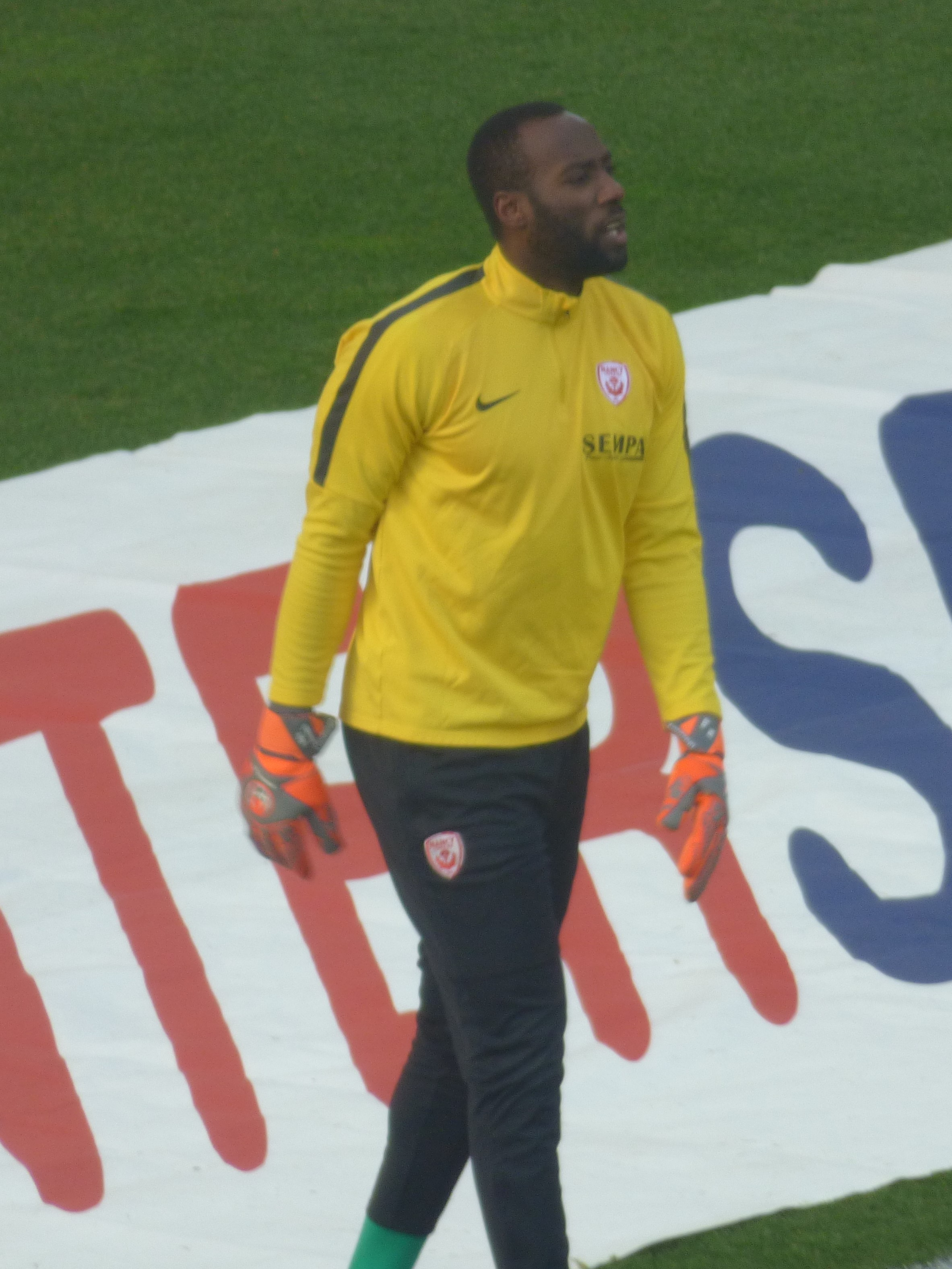
- Ndy Assembé in 2019

Personal information
- Full name: Guy Roland Ndy Assembé
- Date of birth: 28 February 1986 (age 40)
- Place of birth: Yaoundé, Cameroon
- Height: 1.84 m (6 ft 0 in)
- Position: Goalkeeper

Youth career
- 1992–2002: ASPTT Nantes
- 2004–2007: Nantes

Senior career*
Years	Team	Apps	(Gls)
2007–2011	Nantes	44	(0)
2009–2010	→ Valenciennes (loan)	17	(0)
2011–2019	Nancy	139	(0)
2013–2014	→ Guingamp (loan)	19	(0)
2020–2021	US Boulogne	7	(0)
2021–2022	Hostert	17	(0)
Total		243	(0)

International career
2010–2016	Cameroon	16	(0)
- * Club domestic league appearances and goals as of 21 February 2023

Guy Roland Ndy Assembé (born 28 February 1986) is a Cameroonian former professional footballer who played as a goalkeeper.

== Club career ==
Ndy Assembé arrived in France from Cameroon at the age of two. When he was six he started playing for amateur team ASPTT Nantes as a defender. At age fourteen he asked to change role to goalkeeper, and after a year of this position he was spotted by FC Nantes recruiter Vincent Bracigliano. He made his league debut for Nantes on 25 February 2008 in the Ligue 2 match at Sedan.

In August 2009 he joined Ligue 1 side FC Valenciennes on a season-long loan, with an option to buy. Despite being signed as a third, or rotating second-choice, he made 17 league starts for Valenciennes during the season, due to a serious injury to first-choice Nicolas Penneteau. He returned to Nantes after his loan, and was first choice during the 2010–11 Ligue 2 season.

In July 2011 he made a million-euro transfer to AS Nancy in Ligue 1. He made his debut for the club in the fifth match of the 2011–12 Ligue 1 season, on 11 September 2011, in a 0–0 draw against Auxerre. He went on to make

At the end of the 2012–13 season, with Nancy relegated to Ligue 2, he returned to Ligue 1 on a season-long loan with Guingamp. He returned to Nancy and went on to play 139 league games for the club, including 36 in the 2015–16 Ligue 2 championship season, before leaving at the end of the 2018–19 season, when his contract expired.

After six months without a club, he joined US Boulogne in January 2020.

== International career ==
Ndy Assembé was first called up to the Cameroon national football team in December 2009, as part of the 23-man squad for 2010 Africa Cup of Nations. He retained his position for the 2010 FIFA World Cup, and made his international debut in a warm-up friendly against Georgia on 25 May 2010.

He was also selected as part of the squad for the 2015 Africa Cup of Nations.

== Personal life ==
Ndy Assembé holds Cameroonian nationality from birth and acquired French nationality by naturalization on 20 June 2007.

== Career statistics ==
=== Club ===
Appearances and goals by club, season and competition
Club	Season	League			National Cup		League Cup		Total	
Club	Season	Division	Apps	Goals	Apps	Goals	Apps	Goals	Apps	Goals
Nantes	2006–07	Ligue 1	0	0	0	0	0	0	0	0
Nantes	2007–08	Ligue 1	3	0	0	0	0	0	3	0
Nantes	2008–09	Ligue 1	6	0	0	0	0	0	6	0
Nantes	2010–11	Ligue 2	35	0	5	0	0	0	40	0
Nantes	Total		44	0	5	0	0	0	49	0
Valenciennes (loan)	2009–10	Ligue 1	17	0	0	0	0	0	17	0
Nancy	2011–12	Ligue 1	31	0	0	0	0	0	31	0
Nancy	2012–13	Ligue 1	15	0	3	0	0	0	18	0
Nancy	2014–15	Ligue 2	8	0	2	0	2	0	12	0
Nancy	2015–16	Ligue 2	36	0	0	0	0	0	36	0
Nancy	2016–17	Ligue 1	23	0	1	0	1	0	25	0
Nancy	2017–18	Ligue 2	6	0	0	0	0	0	6	0
Nancy	2018–19	Ligue 2	20	0	4	0	0	0	24	0
Nancy	Total		139	0	10	0	3	0	152	0
Guingamp (loan)	2013–14	Ligue 1	19	0	0	0	1	0	20	0
US Boulogne	2019–20	Championnat National	0	0	—		—		0	0
US Boulogne	2020–21	Championnat National	7	0	2	0	—		9	0
US Boulogne	Total		7	0	2	0	—		9	0
Hostert	2021–22	Luxembourg National Division	17	0	0	0	—		17	0
Career total			243	0	17	0	4	0	264	0

=== International ===
Appearances and goals by national team and year
National team	Year	Apps	Goals
Cameroon	2010	4	0
Cameroon	2011	4	0
Cameroon	2012	2	0
Cameroon	2013	0	0
Cameroon	2014	2	0
Cameroon	2015	3	0
Cameroon	2016	1	0
Total		16	0

== Honours ==
Guingamp

- Coupe de France: 2013–14

Nancy

- Ligue 2: 2015–16
