= Rodrigue Moundounga =

Gabonese footballer

Personal information
- Full name: Rodrigue Moundounga
- Date of birth: 28 August 1982 (age 44)
- Place of birth: Libreville, Gabon
- Height: 1.74 m (5 ft 8 1/2 in)
- Position: Right back

Team information
- Current team: CF Mounana

Senior career*
Years	Team	Apps	(Gls)
1998–2003	USM Libreville	?	(?)
2004–2005	Delta Téléstar	?	(?)
2006–2007	FC 105 Libreville	?	(?)
2007	Delta Téléstar	?	(?)
2007–2008	FC 105 Libreville	?	(?)
2008–2010	AS Mangasport	?	(?)
2010–2012	Olympique Béja	23	(1)
2012–	CF Mounana		

International career^{‡}
2001–	Gabon	65	(1)
- * Club domestic league appearances and goals as of 25 May 2013 ‡ National team caps and goals as of 25 January 2016

Rodrigue Moundounga (born 28 August 1982) is a Gabonese international footballer who plays as a defender for CF Mounana.

== Career ==
Born in Libreville, Moundounga played in his native Gabon for USM Libreville, Delta Téléstar, FC 105 Libreville and AS Mangasport, before moving to Tunisian side Olympique Béja in 2010.

Moundounga has made several appearances for the Gabon national football team. He played for the side the finished third at the 2005 CEMAC Cup.
