= Kampamba Chintu =

Zambian football defender (born 1980)

Personal information
- Date of birth: 28 December 1980 (age 45)
- Place of birth: Kabwe, Zambia
- Height: 1.85 m (6 ft 1 in)
- Position: Central defender

Team information
- Current team: Kabwe Warriors (player-manager)

Senior career*
Years	Team	Apps	(Gls)
1999–2004	Kabwe Warriors		
2001	→ IFK Hässleholm (loan)		
2004–2007	Lamontville Golden Arrows	61	(2)
2007–2008	Free State Stars	22	(0)
2008–2010	AmaZulu	31	(2)
2010–2012	Bidvest Wits	20	(0)
2013	Kabwe Warriors		
2013	Roses United		
2013–	Kabwe Warriors		

International career^{‡}
1999–2012	Zambia	33	(0)
- * Club domestic league appearances and goals as of May 7, 2016 ‡ National team caps and goals as of May 7, 2016

Kampamba Chintu (born 28 December 1980, Kabwe) is a Zambian football defender, he is currently player-manager at Kabwe Warriors. He was a member of the Zambia national team between 1999 and 2012.

== Career ==
Chintu spent the first five years of his career with Zambian club Kabwe Warriors, he left the club temporarily in 2001 to join Swedish side IFK Hässleholm on loan. In 2004, Chintu agreed to move to South Africa to sign for Lamontville Golden Arrows, he scored twice in 61 appearances for Golden Arrows before leaving to move to fellow South African club Free State Stars, but Chintu appeared in just 22 appearances for the club before departing. 2008 saw him join his third team in South Africa as he signed for AmaZulu, 31 appearances followed as well as 2 goals for Chintu before he was on the move again when he joined Bidvest Wits where he participated in 20 matches before being released in August 2012.

In 2013, Chintu returned to Zambia and signed for his former club Kabwe Warriors but remained with them for just six months before going back to South Africa to play for Roses United, however his spell with Roses lasted just three months as he left to go back to Kabwe as player-manager.

== Honours ==
National team

Zambia

- Africa Cup of Nations: 2012
- CAF African Youth: 1999
- FIFA World Youth Cup: 1999
