= Yassin Mikari =

Swiss-Tunisian footballer (born 1983)

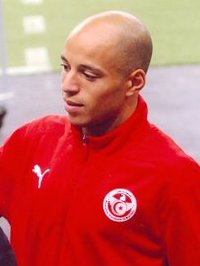
- Mikari in 2013

Personal information
- Full name: Yassin Salim Mikari
- Date of birth: 9 January 1983 (age 43)
- Place of birth: Zürich, Switzerland
- Height: 1.72 m (5 ft 8 in)
- Position: Left back

Senior career*
Years	Team	Apps	(Gls)
2001–2003	Grasshoppers	5	(1)
2003–2004	FC Luzern	40	(9)
2005–2006	FC Winterthur	57	(4)
2007–2009	Grasshoppers	58	(2)
2009–2013	Sochaux	82	(3)
2013–2014	FC Luzern	30	(2)
2014–2016	Club Africain	23	(3)
2016–2018	FC Schaffhausen	28	(10)

International career^{‡}
2002–2004	Switzerland U-21	7	(0)
2007–2015	Tunisia	31	(1)
- * Club domestic league appearances and goals as of 21:41, 4 July 2019 (UTC) ‡ National team caps and goals as of 8 June 2014

Yassin Mikari (Arabic: ياسين الميكاري; born 9 January 1983) is a former professional footballer. Born in Switzerland, he represented Tunisia at international level.

== Club career ==
Mikari re-joined Grasshopper Club Zürich on 21 January 2007 and left for French club Sochaux in the Ligue 1 on 2 January 2009. He returned to Switzerland in July 2013 for his former club FC Luzern, signing a three-year deal. On 7 July 2014, he joined Tunisian Club Africain on a two-year deal.

== International career ==
Mikari capped for Switzerland U-21 at the 2004 U-21 Euro qualifying stage. At the senior level, he was first capped for Tunisia at the 2008 Africa Cup of Nations. He also played for Tunisia in the 2010 Africa Cup of Nations in Angola.
