= Moïse Brou Apanga =

Gabonese footballer (1982–2017)

- Brou Apanga with Stade Brestois 29

Personal information
- Full name: Moïse Brou Apanga
- Date of birth: 4 February 1982
- Place of birth: Abidjan, Ivory Coast
- Date of death: 26 April 2017 (aged 35)
- Place of death: Libreville, Gabon
- Height: 1.80 m (5 ft 11 in)
- Position: Centre back

Senior career*
Years	Team	Apps	(Gls)
1999–2000	Politehnica Timișoara		
2000–2004	Perugia	0	(0)
2004	Sambenedettese		
2004–2006	Brescia	0	(0)
2006–2008	FC 105 Libreville		
2008–2012	Brest	83	(5)
2012–2017	Mangasport		
2017	FC 105 Libreville		

International career
2007–2013	Gabon	33	(1)
- * Club domestic league appearances and goals

Moïse Brou Apanga (4 February 1982 – 26 April 2017) was a professional footballer who played as a centre back. Born in the Ivory Coast, he represented Gabon at international level.

== International career ==
Brou Apanga represented his country at the 2012 African Cup of Nations, during which Gabon, as hosts of the competition, reached the quarter-finals.

== Death ==
Brou Apanga died in April 2017, having suffered a heart attack while training with his club side FC 105 Libreville.

== See also ==
- List of association footballers who died while playing
