= Romeo (given name) =

Romeo is an Italian masculine given name. It arose from the Greek Ρωμαίος for a Roman citizen or a pilgrim to Rome. The popularity of the name is primarily due to Luigi da Porto naming his tragic hero Romeo Montecchi in his 1524 novel Giulietta e Romeo, 70 years later adapted by Shakespeare into the play Romeo and Juliet. People with this name include:

- Romeo Acop (1947–2025), Filipino politician
- Romeo Acquarone (1895–1980), Monegasque tennis player
- Roméo Affessi (born 1984), Ivory Coast-born footballer
- Romeo Alaeff (born 1970), American visual artist
- Romeo Anaya (1946–2015), Mexican boxer
- Romeo Antoniazzi (1862–1925), Italian violin maker
- Romeo Bandison (born 1971), Dutch American-football defensive tackle
- Roméo Beaudry (1882–1932), French Canadian author, composer, pianist and record producer
- Romeo Beckham (born 2002), son of David and Victoria Beckham
- Romeo Bégin (1895–?), Canadian (Ontario) politician
- Romeo Benetti (born 1945), Italian football defender
- Romeo Bertini (1893–1973), Italian long-distance runner
- Romeo Bezușcu (born 1964), Romanian rugby player
- Romeo Roy Blanchette (1913–1982), American Roman Catholic Bishop
- Romeo T. Boisvert (1916–1981), American (Maine) Democratic politician
- Romeo Bosetti (1879–1948), Italian-born French actor and screenwriter
- Romeo Bragato (1859–1913), Italian-born Australian and New Zealand winemaker
- Romeo A. Brawner (1935–2008), Filipino public official
- Romeo Brin (born 1973), Filipino boxer
- Romeo Bunică (born 1974), Romanian football forward
- Romeo Munoz Cachola (born 1938), Philippines-born American (Hawaii) politician
- Roméo Calenda (born 1972), French football
- Romeo Callejo Sr. (born 1937), Filipino Supreme Court Justice
- Romeo Cascarino (1922–2002), American classical composer
- Romeo Castelen (born 1983), Dutch football winger
- Romeo Castellucci (born 1960), Italian theatre director, playwright and designer
- Romeo Challenger (born 1950), Caribbean-born, British-based musician
- Romeo Corbo (born 1952), Uruguayan football striker
- Romeo Crennel (born 1947), American football coach
- Romeo de la Cruz (born 1936), Filipino lawyer
- Roméo Dallaire (born 1946), Canadian senator, general, humanitarian and author
- Romeo Diaz (born 1940s), Filipino film score composer
- Romeo Doubs (born 2000), American football player
- Romeo Elton (1817–1889), American academic and author
- Romeo Fernandes (born 1992), Indian football winger
- Romeo Filipović (born 1986), German-born Croatian football player
- Roméo Fortin (1886–1953), Canadian (Quebec) politician
- Romeo H. Freer (1846–1913), American (West Virginia) politician and Attorney General
- Roméo Gagné (1905–1959), Canadian (Quebec) politician
- Romeo Galán (born 1933), Argentine sprinter
- Romeo Gigli (born 1949), Italian fashion designer
- Romeo Gontineac (born 1973), Romanian rugby player
- Romeo A. Horton (1923–2005), Americo-Liberian banker
- Romeo James (born 1958), Indian field hockey player
- Romeo Jenebyan (born 1979), Armenian football midfielder
- Romeo Johnson (born c.1970), American singer-songwriter, composer, and vocal coach
- Romeo Jozak (born 1972), Croatian football player and coach
- Romeo Kambou (born 1980), Burkinabé football striker
- Romeo Kapudija (born 1970), American-Croatian race car driver
- Romeo Kreinberg (born 1950s), American–German business executive
- Romeo Lahey (1887–1968), Australian businessman, civil servant and conservationist
- Romeo Lamothe (1914–1991), Canadian (Alberta) politician
- Romeo Langford (born 1999), American basketball player
- Roméo LeBlanc (1928–2009), Canadian journalist, politician, and statesman; Governor General of Canada 1995–99
- Romeo Lemboumba (born 1980), Gabonese boxer
- Roméo Lorrain (1901–1967), Canadian (Quebec) politician
- Romeo Mancini (1917–2003), Italian painter and sculptor
- Romeo Mathieu (1917–1989), Canadian trade unionist and progressive political activist
- Romeo McKnight (born 1998), American football player
- Romeo Menti (1919–1949), Italian footballer
- Romeo Miller (born 1989), American rapper, actor, entrepreneur and model
- Romeo Mitrović (born 1979), Bosnian-Herzegovinian football goalkeeper
- Romeo Montenegro (born 1974), Filipino civil servant and nurse
- Romeo Muller (1928–1992), American screenwriter and actor
- Romeo Muradyan (born 1979), Armenian actor
- Romeo Murga (1904–1925), Chilean poet, writer and translator
- Romeo Nedelcu (born 1939), Romanian bobsledder
- Romeo Nelson (1902–1974), American boogie woogie pianist
- Romeo Neri (1903–1961), Italian gymnast
- Romeo Niram (born 1974), Spanish painter
- Romeo Okwara (born 1995), American football linebacker
- Romeo Olea (1962–2011), Filipino radio commentator
- Romeo Oliva (1889–1975), Italian admiral during World War II
- Romeo Ortega (born 1954), Mexican-French computer scientist
- Romeo Papini (born 1983), Italian football midfielder
- Romeo Parkes (born 1990), Jamaican football striker
- Romeo Pazzini (1855–1942), Italian sculptor, painter and ceramist
- Roméo Phillion (1939–2015), Canadian person wrongfully convicted of murder
- Romeo Rivera (born 1939), Filipino actor
- Romeo Rivers (1907–1986), Canadian ice hockey player
- Romeo Romanutti (1926–2007), Italian basketball player
- Romeo Roselli (born 1980), American professional wrestler Johnny Roselli
- Roméo Sabourin (1923–1944), Canadian soldier and spy during World War II
- Romeo Sacchetti (born 1953), Italian basketball player and coach
- Romeo Saganash (born 1961), Canadian Member of Parliament and Shadow Minister
- Romeo Santos (born 1981), American bachata singer and songwriter Anthony Santos
- Romeo Shahinas (born 1996), Albanian football midfielder
- Romeo Sisti (fl. 1928), Italian rower
- Romeo Stavarache (born 1962), Romanian mayor
- Romeo Stodart (born 1977), Trinidad-born English pop rock musician
- Romeo Surdu (born 1984), Romanian footballer
- Romeo Tabuena (1921–2015), Filipino painter and printmaker
- Romeo Tan (born 1985), Singaporean actor
- Romeo Tanaka (born 1973), Japanese video game designer
- Romeo Tanghal (born 1945), Filipino comics artist
- Romeo Tirone (born 1960s), American cinematographer and television director
- Romeo Travis (born 1984), American-born Macedonian basketball player
- Romeo Valentino (born 1968), American professional wrestler and promoter
- Romeo Van Dessel (born 1989), Belgian football midfielder
- Romeo Vasquez (1939–2017), stage name of Filipino actor Ricardo Sumilang
- Romeo Vásquez Velásquez (born 1957), Honduran politician and brigadier general
- Romeo Venturelli (1938–2011), Italian racing cyclist
- Romeo Wouden (born 1970), Dutch footballer
- Romeo Zhivikj (1962–2004), Serbian-Macedonian gangster
- Romeo Zondervan (born 1970), Dutch football midfielder

Fictional characters

- Romeo Montague, tragic hero of Romeo and Juliet
- Romeo Santana, a main character from The Steve Harvey Show
- Romeo Smith, character from the Australian soap opera Home and Away
- Romeo, one of the evil UniSols in Universal Soldier 2
- Romeo Nightingale, a character from the British soap Hollyoaks
- Romeo F. Neumann, the true name of Bedman from Guilty Gear
- Romeo, one of the villains from children's TV series PJ Masks
- Romeo, the main antagonist of the second season of the video game Minecraft: Story Mode
- Romeo Scorpius Lucci, a character from the supernatural mobile game Tokyo Debunker

== See also ==
- Romeo (disambiguation)
- Romeu, a Portuguese-language variant
