= 2006–07 K.S.K. Beveren season =

K.S.K. Beveren
2006–07 season
- Manager: Walter Meeuws (until 25 March); Eddy De Bolle (from 26 March)
- Stadium: Freethiel Stadion
- Belgian First Division: 18th (relegated)
- Belgian Cup: Sixth round
- Top goalscorer: League: Mahamadou Dissa (6); All: Mahamadou Dissa (6)
- Biggest win: Beveren 3–1 Royal Excelsior Mouscron
- Biggest defeat: Anderlecht 8–1 Beveren

The 2006–07 season was K.S.K. Beveren's 73rd season in existence and 10th consecutive in the Belgian First Division. They also competed in the Belgian Cup.

== First-team squad ==
Note: Flags indicate national team as defined under FIFA eligibility rules; some limited exceptions apply. Players may hold more than one non-FIFA nationality.

No.	Pos.	Nation	Player
—	GK	CIV	Copa
—	GK	BEL	Davino Verhulst
—	GK	CAN	Roberto Giacomi
—	DF	BEL	David Van Hoyweghen
—	DF	CIV	Diabis Diawara
—	DF	FRA	Jonathan Joseph-Augustin
—	DF	BEL	Kristof Lardenoit
—	DF	BEL	Kwakye Oduro
—	DF	CIV	Mondakan Mahan
—	DF	CIV	Sekou Ouattara
—	MF	CIV	Alexandre Tokpa
—	MF	BEL	Davy Theunis
—	MF	FRA	Laurent Macquet

No.	Pos.	Nation	Player
—	MF	CIV	Zito
—	MF	CIV	Pacheco
—	MF	CIV	Seka
—	MF	CIV	Seydou Badjan Kanté
—	MF	BEL	Karel Snoeckx
—	FW	CIV	Arunyna
—	FW	CRO	Ivan Božić
—	FW	CIV	Kaiper
—	FW	POL	Paweł Buśkiewicz
—	FW	BEL	Sam De Munter
—	FW	CIV	Gervinho
—	FW	MLI	Mahamadou Dissa

== Competitions ==
=== Overall record ===
Competition	First match	Last match	Starting round	Final position	Record							
Competition	First match	Last match	Starting round	Final position	Pld	W	D	L	GF	GA	GD	Win %
Belgian First Division	29 July 2006	19 May 2007	Matchday 1	18th	34	5	10	19	31	64	−33	14.71
Belgian Cup	21 October 2006		Sixth round	Sixth round	1	0	0	1	1	2	−1	0.00
Total					35	5	10	20	32	66	−34	14.29

Source: Competitions

=== Belgian First Division ===
==== League table ====
Pos	Team	Pld	W	D	L	GF	GA	GD	Pts	Qualification or relegation
14	Zulte Waregem	34	9	10	15	40	54	−14	37	
15	Sint-Truiden	34	9	8	17	39	52	−13	35	
16	Lokeren	34	5	15	14	32	48	−16	30	
17	Lierse (R)	34	6	8	20	33	66	−33	26	Qualification to the Relegation play-offs
18	Beveren (R)	34	5	10	19	31	64	−33	25	Relegation to 2007–08 Belgian Second Division

(R) Relegated

==== Results summary ====
Overall								Home						Away					
Pld	W	D	L	GF	GA	GD	Pts	W	D	L	GF	GA	GD	W	D	L	GF	GA	GD
34	5	10	19	31	64	−33	25	4	8	5	19	28	−9	1	2	14	12	36	−24

==== Results by round ====
Round	1	2	3	4	5	6	7	8	9	10	11	12	13	14	15	16	17	18	19	20	21	22	23	24	25	26	27	28	29	30	31	32	33	34
Ground	A	H	A	H	A	H	A	H	A	H	A	H	A	H	H	A	H	H	A	H	A	H	A	H	A	H	A	H	A	H	A	A	H	A
Result	L	L	L	W	L	D	L	W	W	L	D	W	L	D	D	L	L	D	L	L	L	W	L	L	L	D	D	D	L	D	L	L	D	L
Position	14	17	18	15	17	17	17	17	14	15	16	12	15	14	14	16	16	15	17	17	17	17	17	17	17	17	17	17	17	17	17	17	17	18

A = Away; H = Home; W = Win; D = Draw; L = Loss; P = Postponed

==== Matches ====
29 July 2006 1	Germinal Beerschot	1–0	Beveren	Antwerp
20:00 CET (UTC+1)				Stadium: Olympisch Stadion; Referee: Jérôme Efong Nzolo

5 August 2006 2	Beveren	0–3	Westerlo	Beveren
20:00 CET (UTC+1)				Stadium: Freethiel Stadion; Referee: Christophe Delacour

19 August 2006 3	Club Brugge	2–0	Beveren	Bruges
20:00 CET (UTC+1)				Stadium: Jan Breydelstadion; Referee: Marc Goudeseune

26 August 2006 4	Beveren	3–1	Royal Excelsior Mouscron	Beveren
20:00 CET (UTC+1)				Stadium: Freethiel Stadion; Referee: Benoni Burie

10 September 2006 5	Lokeren	2–0	Beveren	Lokeren
20:30 CET (UTC+1)				Stadium: Daknamstadion; Referee: Peter Vervecken

16 September 2006 6	Beveren	2–2	Charleroi	Beveren
20:00 CET (UTC+1)				Stadium: Freethiel Stadion; Referee: Philippe Flament

23 September 2006 7	Genk	1–0	Beveren	Genk
20:00 CET (UTC+1)				Stadium: Fenixstadion; Referee: Luc Wouters

1 October 2006 8	Beveren	1–0	Zulte Waregem	Beveren
20:30 CET (UTC+1)				Stadium: Freethiel Stadion; Referee: Geert Michiels

14 October 2006 9	Lierse	0–1	Beveren	Lier
20:00 CET (UTC+1)				Stadium: Herman Vanderpoortenstadion; Referee: Johan Verbist

28 October 2006 10	Beveren	0–3	Standard Liège	Beveren
20:00 CET (UTC+1)				Stadium: Freethiel Stadion; Referee: Johny Ver Eecke

4 November 2006 11	Cercle Brugge	2–2	Beveren	Bruges
20:00 CET (UTC+1)				Stadium: Jan Breydelstadion; Referee: Joeri Van De Velde

11 November 2006 12	Beveren	1–0	Gent	Beveren
20:00 CET (UTC+1)				Stadium: Freethiel Stadion; Referee: Laurent Colemonts

18 November 2006 13	KSV Roeselare	2–1	Beveren	Roeselare
20:00 CET (UTC+1)				Stadium: Schiervelde Stadion; Referee: Claude Bourdouxhe

25 November 2006 14	Beveren	2–2	Molenbeek Brussels Strombeek	Beveren
20:00 CET (UTC+1)				Stadium: Freethiel Stadion; Referee: Kris Bellon

1 December 2006 15	Beveren	1–1	Anderlecht	Beveren
20:30 CET (UTC+1)				Stadium: Freethiel Stadion; Referee: Stéphane Breda

9 December 2006 16	RAEC Mons	1–0	Beveren	Mons
20:00 CET (UTC+1)				Stadium: Stade Charles Tondreau; Referee: Peter Jordens

16 December 2006 17	Beveren	1–2	Sint-Truiden	Beveren
20:00 CET (UTC+1)				Stadium: Freethiel Stadion; Referee: Philippe Vinche

20 January 2007 18	Beveren	1–1	Germinal Beerschot	Beveren
20:00 CET (UTC+1)				Stadium: Freethiel Stadion; Referee: Philippe Flament

27 January 2007 19	Westerlo	2–0	Beveren	Westerlo
20:00 CET (UTC+1)				Stadium: Het Kuipje

2 February 2007 20	Beveren	0–2	Club Brugge	Beveren
20:30 CET (UTC+1)				Stadium: Freethiel Stadion

10 February 2007 21	Royal Excelsior Mouscron	4–2	Beveren	Mouscron
20:00 CET (UTC+1)				Stadium: Stade Le Canonnier

17 February 2007 22	Beveren	3–2	Lokeren	Beveren
18:00 CET (UTC+1)				Stadium: Freethiel Stadion

24 February 2007 23	Charleroi	2–1	Beveren	Charleroi
20:00 CET (UTC+1)				Stadium: Stade du Pays de Charleroi

3 March 2007 24	Beveren	0–5	Genk	Beveren
18:00 CET (UTC+1)				Stadium: Freethiel Stadion

10 March 2007 25	Zulte Waregem	2–1	Beveren	Waregem
20:00 CET (UTC+1)				Stadium: Regenboogstadion

17 March 2007 26	Beveren	1–1	Lierse	Beveren
20:00 CET (UTC+1)				Stadium: Freethiel Stadion

31 March 2007 27	Standard Liège	0–0	Beveren	Liège
20:00 CET (UTC+1)				Stadium: Stade Maurice Dufrasne

7 April 2007 28	Beveren	1–1	Cercle Brugge	Beveren
20:00 CET (UTC+1)				Stadium: Freethiel Stadion

15 April 2007 29	Gent	2–1	Beveren	Ghent
18:00 CET (UTC+1)				Stadium: Jules Ottenstadion

21 April 2007 30	Beveren	2–2	KSV Roeselare	Beveren
20:00 CET (UTC+1)				Stadium: Freethiel Stadion

28 April 2007 31	Molenbeek Brussels Strombeek	2–0	Beveren	Molenbeek-Saint-Jean
20:00 CET (UTC+1)	Matumona 6'; Téhoué 65'			Stadium: Edmond Machtens Stadium; Referee: Frank De Bleeckere

6 May 2007 32	Anderlecht	8–1	Beveren	Anderlecht
20:30 CET (UTC+1)	Frutos 1'; Boussoufa 33', 44', 52'; Mbokani 78', 86', 89'; Hassan 83' (pen.)		Affessi 75'	Stadium: Constant Vanden Stock Stadium; Referee: Alain Hamer (Luxembourg)

12 May 2007 33	Beveren	0–0	RAEC Mons	Beveren
20:00 CET (UTC+1)				Stadium: Freethiel Stadion; Referee: Jean-Baptist Bultynck

19 May 2007 34	Sint-Truiden	3–2	Beveren	Sint-Truiden
20:00 CET (UTC+1)	Sishuba 4'; Wisniowski 59'; Simaeys 89'		Dissa 8'; Ibou 83'	Stadium: Stayen; Referee: Johan Verbist

=== Belgian Cup ===
21 October 2006 Sixth round	K. Lierse SK	2–1	Beveren	Lier
20:00 CET (UTC+1)	Anđić 44'; Mujanović 81'		Macquet 23'	Stadium: Herman Vanderpoortenstadion; Referee: Peter Vervecken
