= Macquet =

Macquet is a surname. Notable people with the surname include:

- Jean-Baptiste Macquet (born 1983), French rower
- Laurent Macquet (born 1979), French footballer
- Michel Macquet (1932–2002), French athlete
- Phil. Macquet (born 1967), French painter
