= List of people from the Davao Region =

The Davaoeño people or Davaoeños are composed of various permanent residents such as Visayans and Lumad (indigenous people). The Visayans are lowlanders, while the Lumad live in the mountains, like in other islands in the Philippines.

Cebuano is the lingua franca of the Davao Region, used by its inhabitants of diverse ethnic and religious backgrounds to communicate with each other. Native minority speaks the near-extinct Davaoeño language, especially among the elderly residents who live in the region in their lifetime. Davaoeños have a similar accent to those in Metro Cebu. English and Tagalog are also used as a secondary language, especially in Metro Davao.

The following is a list of notable people who were either born in, lived in, are current residents of, or are closely associated with the Davao Region (especially from the highly-urbanized city of Davao).

== Notable people ==
=== Culture ===
- Alfredo E. Evangelista – archaeologist (Davao City)
- Candy Gourlay – Filipino author based in the United Kingdom (Davao City)
- Randy Halasan – winner of the 2014 Ramon Magsaysay Award for Emergent Leadership, for nurturing his Matigsalug students and their community to transform their lives in ways that preserve their integrity as indigenous peoples in a modernizing Philippines (Davao City)

=== Entertainment ===
- Gladys Reyes – actress (Davao City)
- Kaye Cal – singer-songwriter who rose to popularity after becoming a grand finalist of the first season of the talent competition Pilipinas Got Talent
- Sharmaine Arnaiz – actress (Davao City)
- Thor Dulay – singer-songwriter and vocal coach (Panabo)
- Jay Durias – composer, singer, songwriter, arranger, and record producer known for collaborations with South Border (Davao City)
- Juris Fernandez – singer and songwriter; former lead singer of acoustic group MYMP from 2003 to 2009 (Davao City)
- Erich Gonzales – actress, host and Star Circle Quest Grand Teen Questor (Davao City)
- The HiMiG Gospel Singers – choral group from Davao City
- Mimi Miyagi – model, actress and former pornographic actress. (Davao City)
- Iwa Moto – actress, model and teen star (Tagum)
- Cassandra Ponti – actress, dancer, model, and Pinoy Big Brother Season 1 3rd Big Placer (Tagum)
- Lie Reposposa – Pinoy Big Brother: Otso housemate (Tagum)
- Ruben Gonzaga – TV host (Davao City)
- Ryan Ramos – actor and host (Davao City)
- Steven Silva – footballer, actor, reality TV show contestant (Davao City)
- KZ Tandingan – singer who rose to fame after winning the first season of The X Factor Philippines in 2012 (Digos City)
- Krissel Valdez – singer; the first runner-up of Star Power: Sharon Search For the Next Female Superstar (Davao City)
- Maris Racal – actress, singer, PBB All in 1st runner up, member of It's Showtime's GirlTrends (Tagum)
- Chokoleit – actor, comedian (Davao City)
- Jona Soquite – singer, The Voice Teens season 1 champion (Davao City)
- Tricia Santos – volleyball player, actor, TV host (Davao City)
- Lady Morgana – drag performer, Drag Race Philippines (Season 1) contestant
- Esnyr - Social Media Influencer and Pinoy Big Brother: Celebrity Collab Edition housemate (Digos City)

=== Politics and government ===
- Cheeno Almario – politician; Member of the House of Representatives of the Philippines, representing the Second District of Davao Oriental since 2022
- Franklin Bautista – politician; member of the Liberal Party; elected to two terms as a Member of the House of Representatives of the Philippines, representing the Second District of Davao del Sur
- Noel Felongco – politician; lawyer (Davao City)
- Marc Douglas Cagas IV – politician; member of the Nacionalista Party; elected in 2007 as a Member of the House of Representatives of the Philippines, representing the First District of Davao del Sur
- Antonio Carpio – incumbent Senior Associate Justice of the Supreme Court of the Philippines (Davao City)
- Ronald dela Rosa - Senator (Davao del Sur)
- Teodoro Casiño – politician, activist, writer and journalist; was a member of the House of Representatives for Bayan Muna (Davao City)
- Alan Dujali – politician; former member of the House of Representatives of the Philippines, representing the Second District of Davao del Norte from 2019 to 2025
- Rodrigo Duterte – lawyer, politician and mayor of Davao City (1988–1998, 2001–2010, 2013–2016); 16th President of the Philippines (2016–2022) (Davao City)
- Sara Duterte – lawyer and politician; current mayor of Davao City (2010–2013, 2016-2022), 15th Vice President of the Philippines (2022–present) (Davao City)
- Bong Go – senator (Davao City)
- Vincent Garcia – politician; member of the Nationalist People's Coalition; elected to three terms as a Member of the House of Representatives of the Philippines, representing the Second District of Davao City
- Ruwel Peter Gonzaga – lawyer and politician; former member of the House of Representatives of the Philippines, representing the Second District of Davao de Oro from 2016 to 2025
- Antonio Lagdameo Jr. – politician; husband of actress Dawn Zulueta; a scion of the wealthy family in Mindanao, the Floirendos; public servant (Tagum)
- Romeo Montenegro – peace advocate
- Sebastian Duterte – politician and surfer (Davao City)
- Prospero Nograles – former Speaker of the House of Representatives of the Philippines (Davao City)
- Corazon Malanyaon – governor of the province of Davao Oriental
- Allan L. Rellon – Filipino politician and a member of the PDP Laban Party (Samal)
- Isidro Ungab – politician, former banker, former local legislator of the City of Davao
- Wanda Corazon Teo, businesswoman, and former secretary of Tourism
- Manuel E. Zamora – politician; member of the LAKAS-CMD Party; elected to three terms as a Member of the House of Representatives of the Philippines, representing the First District of Compostela Valley
- Carlos Isagani Zarate – member of the Philippine House of Representatives, representing Bayan Muna Party-list (Davao City)

=== Sports ===
- Jerwin Ancajas – World Champion Boxer from Panabo, Davao del Norte; competes in the Super-flyweight division
- Amani Aguinaldo – footballer who plays as a defender mainly as a centre back for Global F.C. in the United Football League, and Philippines national team
- Francis Allera – professional basketball player; currently plays for the Kia Carnival in the Philippine Basketball Association; small forward
- Baser Amer – professional basketball player who plays for the Meralco Bolts in the Philippine Basketball Association
- Mark Anthony Barriga – boxer from Panabo, Davao del Norte; competes in the light-flyweight division
- Donbel Belano – retired professional basketball player in the Philippine Basketball Association; former head coach of the UV Green Lancers
- Lee Vann Corteza – professional pool player
- Samigue Eman – professional basketball player who currently plays for the Alaska Aces in the Philippine Basketball Association
- Erwin Emata – mountain climber
- Pong Escobal – professional basketball player who currently plays for the Air21 Express in the Philippine Basketball Association, having played for Meralco Bolts
- John Ferriols – professional basketball; plays for the Meralco Bolts in the Philippine Basketball Association
- Diosdado Gabi – retired professional boxer
- Ernie Gawilan – swimmer; first Filipino Asian Para Games gold medalist.
- Marice Magdolot – footballer for the Philippines women's national football team; midfielder
- Sheila Mae Perez – diver; Southeast Asian Games gold medalist.
- Randy Petalcorin – professional boxer from the Sandman Gym in General Santos
- Nesthy Petecio – boxer (Santa Cruz)
- John Pinto (basketball) – basketball player who currently plays for the San Miguel Beermen of the PBA; drafted 19th overall by the Batang Pier in the 2014 PBA draft
- RJ Rizada – professional basketball player who currently plays for the Petron Blaze Boosters in the Philippine Basketball Association; twelfth overall pick in the 2006 PBA Draft
- Juanito Rubillar – professional boxer; current WBC Continental Americas light flyweight champion
- Tricia Santos (volleyball) – volleyball player; TV reality show contestant
- Daisuke Sato (footballer) – Japanese-Filipino footballer for CSM Politehnica Iași in Romania's Liga I and for the Philippines national football team
- Alfonso Solis – retired professional basketball player in the Philippine Basketball Association
- Alvin Teng – retired professional basketball player who spent 14 seasons in the PBA, mostly with the San Miguel Beermen franchise
- Scottie Thompson (basketball) – professional basketball player who currently plays for the Barangay Ginebra San Miguel of the PBA (Padada)
- Rustico Torrecampo – retired professional boxer, notable for being the first fighter to defeat Manny Pacquiao

=== Media ===
- Aljo Bendijo – broadcast journalist in the Philippines; anchored ABS-CBN's flagship newscast TV Patrol from 2001 to 2003, and Batingaw (later becoming Teledyaryo: Final Edition) of People's Television Network from 2008 to 2012
- Desidario Camangyan – radio journalist for Sunrise FM in Mati City in the southern Philippines; slain on stage in Manay, Davao Oriental, Mindanao, while hosting a singing contest
- Alex Santos (newscaster) – field reporter, news director and radio commentator for DWIZ, and television host for UNTV and former newscaster and television host for ABS-CBN and DZMM, now on current for PTV-4
- Tulfo Brothers (Davao City)
  - Ben Tulfo – freelance journalist connected with IBC, TV5, PTV-4 and UNTV
  - Erwin Tulfo – journalist for PTV and Radyo Pilipinas, formerly with TV5 Manila, ABS-CBN, RPN-9 and Radio Mindanao Network
  - Raffy Tulfo- journalist for TV5 Manila, formerly with PTV-4, RPN-9 and Radio Mindanao Network
  - Ramon Tulfo – radio host for DWIZ, columnist for Philippine Daily Inquirer, formerly with RPN-9 and DZIQ

=== Fashion, designs and arts ===
- Ang Kiukok – painter; national artist
- Yam Laranas – director and cinematographer
- Danny Sillada – surrealist painter, poet, philosopher, essayist, musician, performance artist and literary, art and cultural critic; from Mindanao

=== Pageantry ===
- Lia Andrea Ramos – Binibining Pilipinas Universe 2006 and representative of the Philippines in the Miss Universe 2006 pageant held in Los Angeles, California.
- Mary Jean Lastimosa – Miss Universe Philippines 2014 and Top 10 Finalist in the Miss Universe 2014 pageant held in Doral, Florida. A native of Tulunan, North Cotabato, Lastimosa studied and resided in Davao City. She won Mutya ng Dabaw (Miss Davao) and was crowned Reyna ng Aliwan in 2008 representing Davao and the Kadayawan Festival.
- Katarina Rodriguez – Binibining Pilipinas Intercontinental 2017, Miss World Philippines 2018 and First Runner-Up in the Miss Intercontinental 2017 pageant held in Egypt. She competed in Miss World Philippines and won the Miss World Philippines title. She also competed in Miss World 2018 held in Sanya, People’s Republic of China.
- Jehza Mae Huelar – Binibining Pilipinas Supranational 2018 and Top 10 Finalist in Miss Supranational 2018, held in Poland.

=== Religion ===
- Apollo Quiboloy – co-founder of SMNI News Channel, founder and religious group leader of the Philippines-based Restorationist church, the Kingdom of Jesus Christ, The Name Above Every Name, Inc (Davao City)
- Leo Soriano – Bishop of the United Methodist Church, elected in 2000 in the Philippines.

== Gallery ==
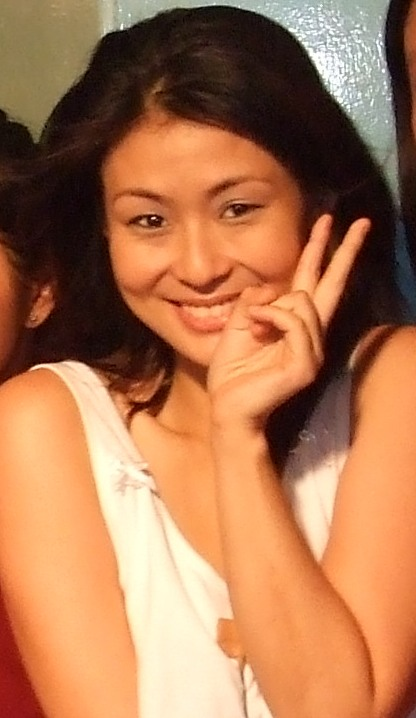
Iwa Moto

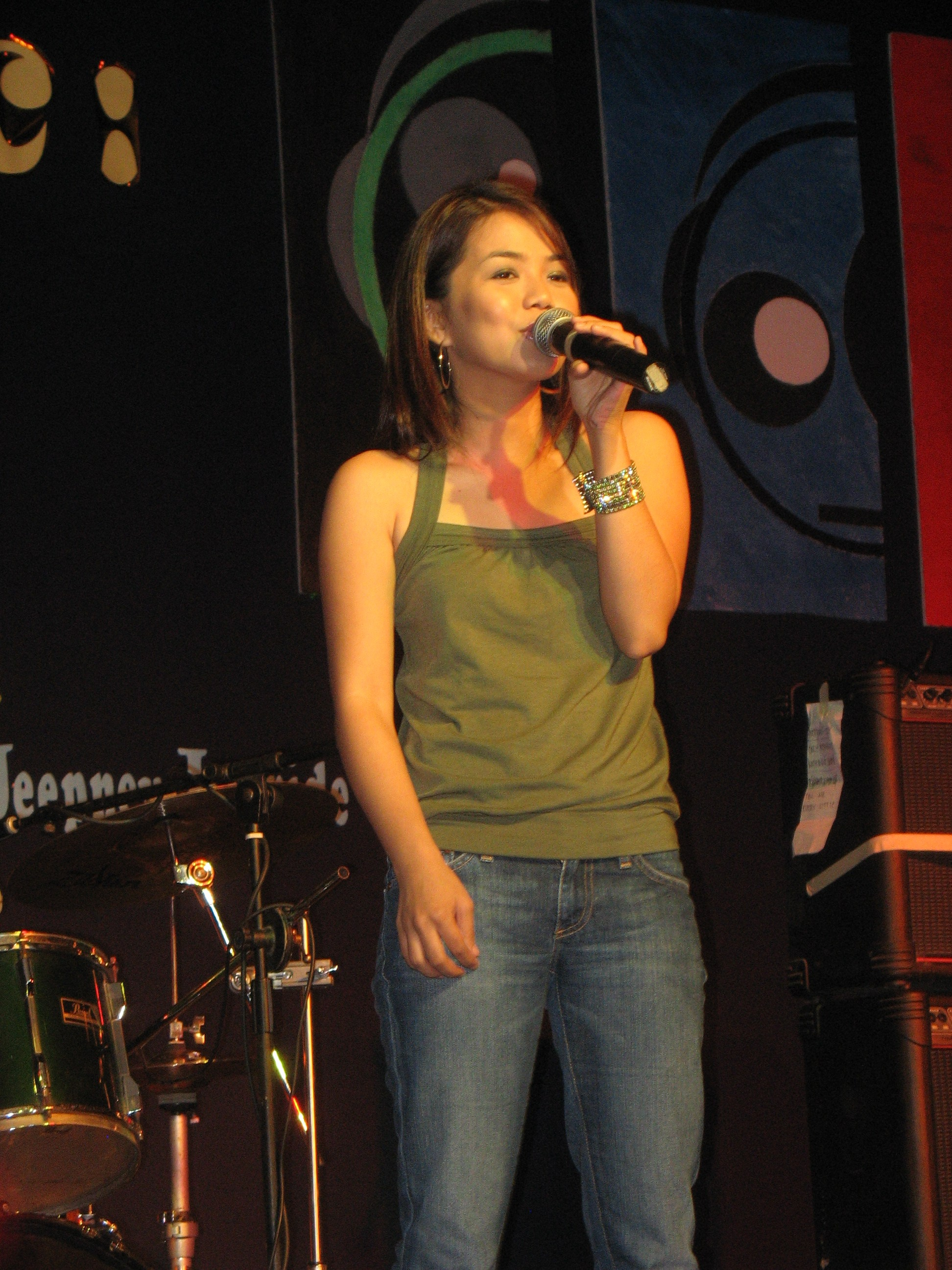
Juris Fernandez

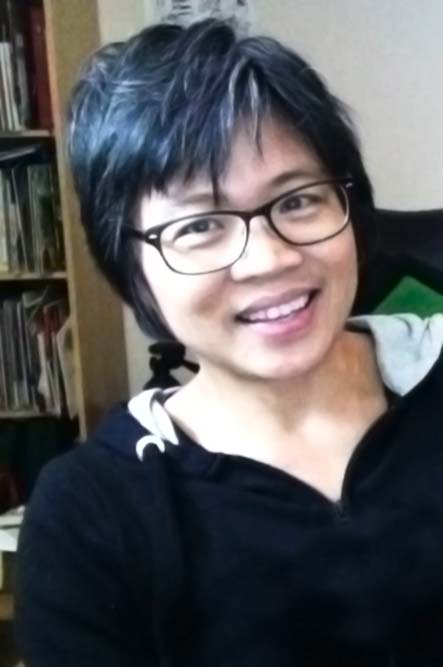
Candy Gourlay

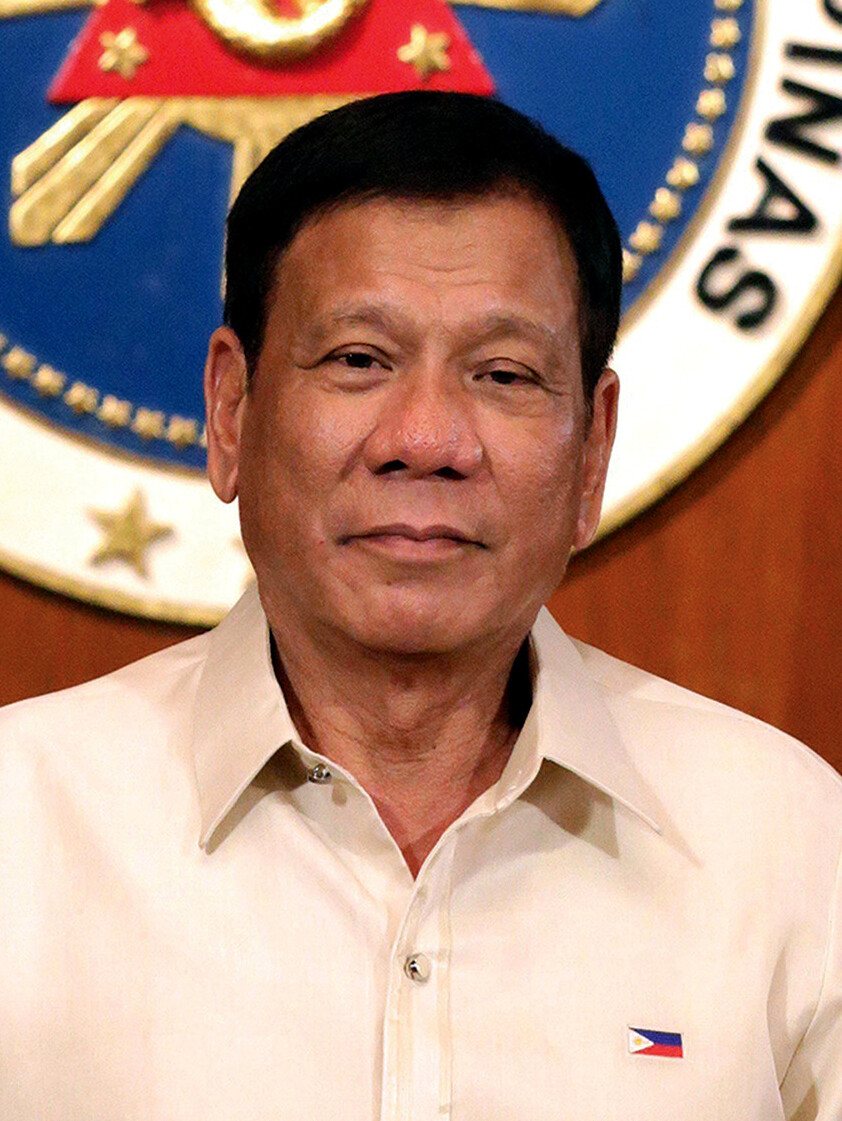
Rodrigo Duterte

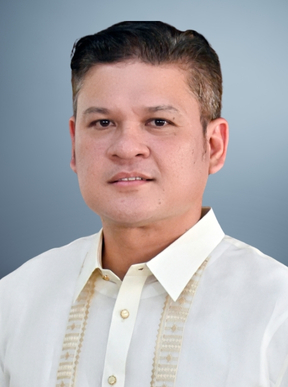
Paolo Duterte

Sara Duterte

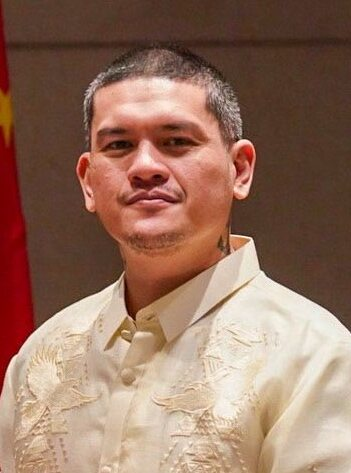
Sebastian Duterte

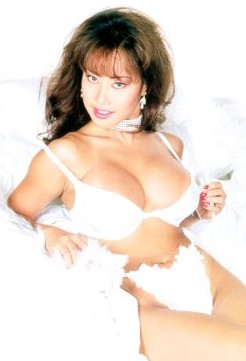
Mimi Miyagi

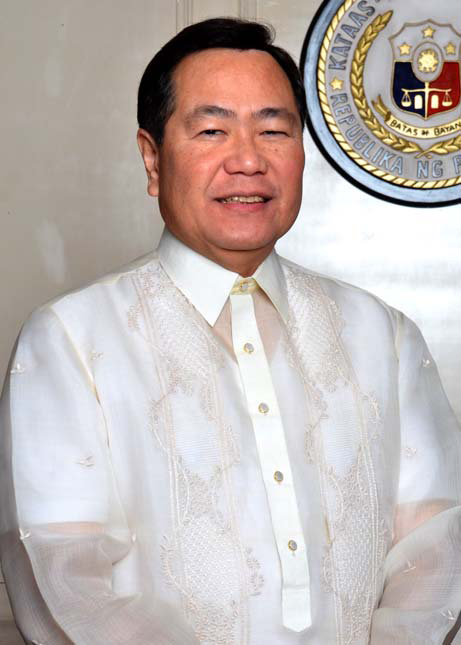
Antonio Carpio

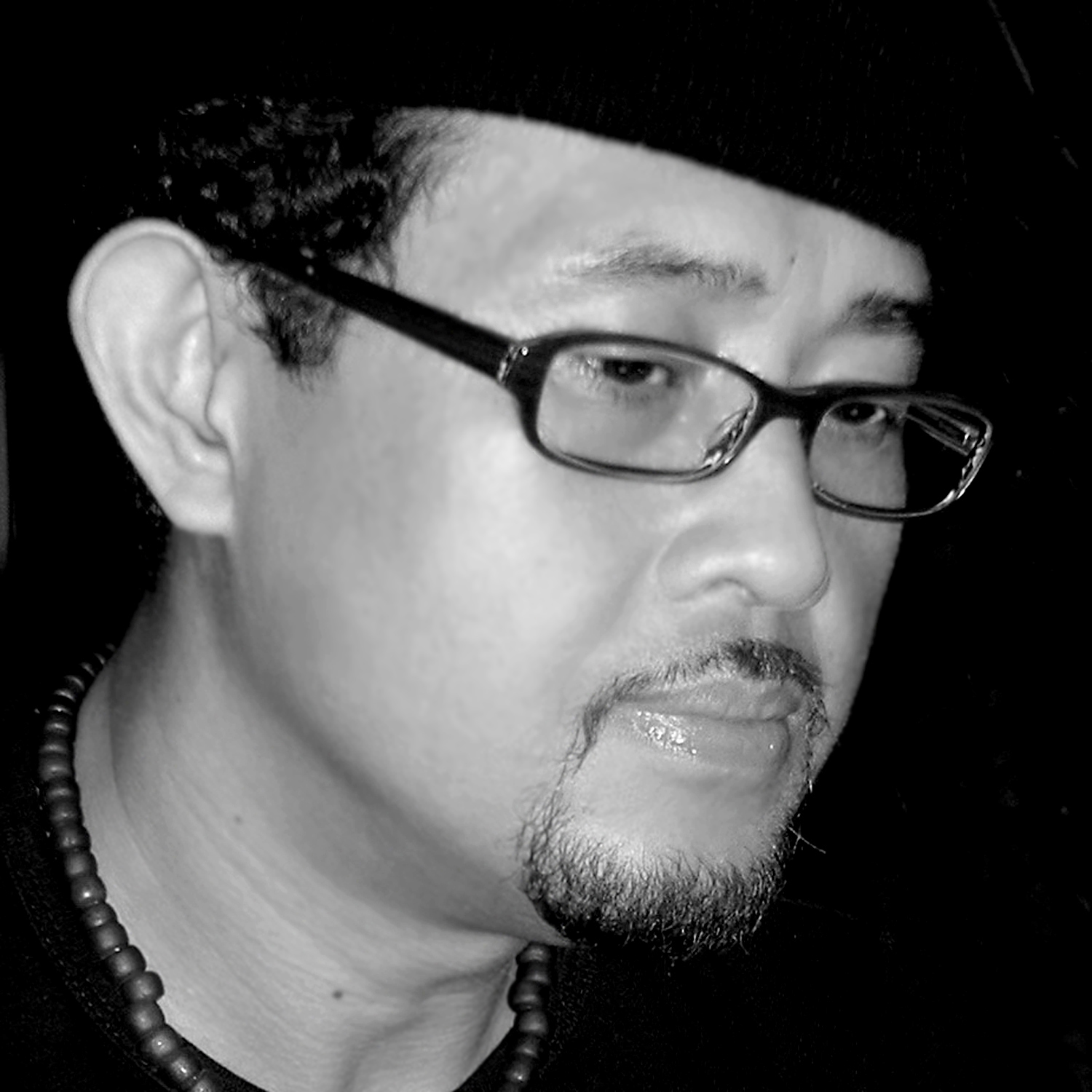
Danny Sillada

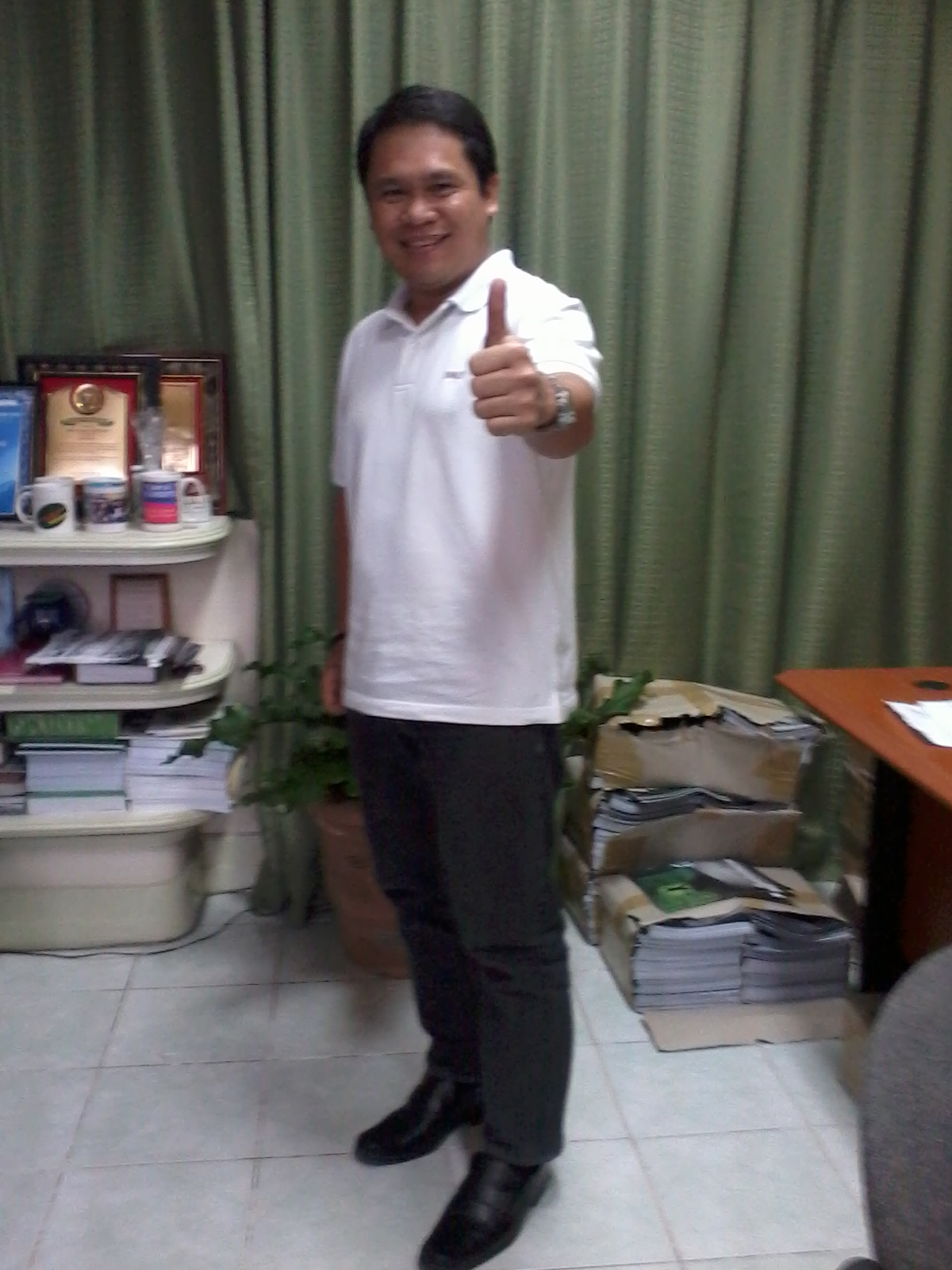
Allan L. Rellon

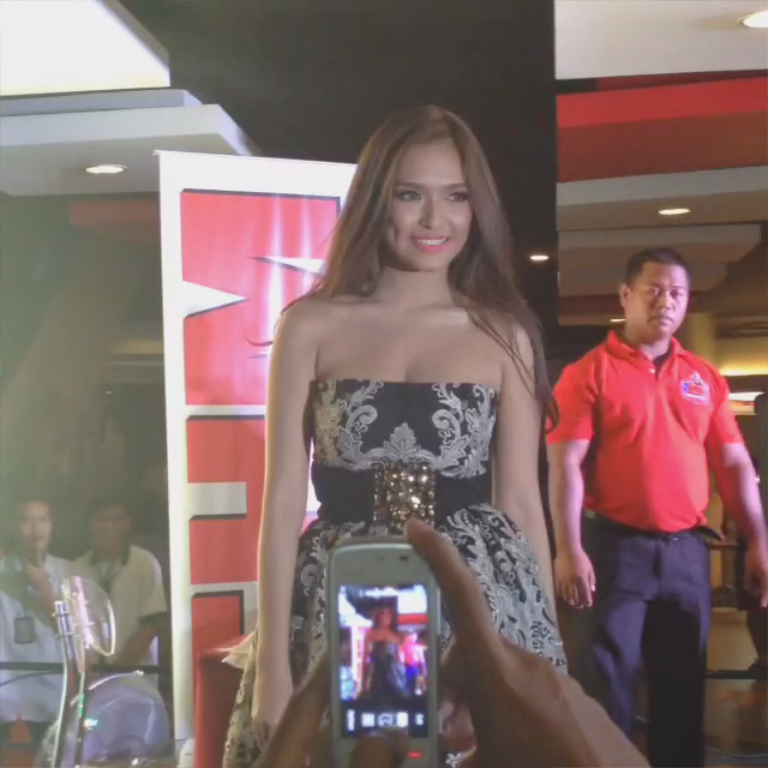
Bangs Garcia

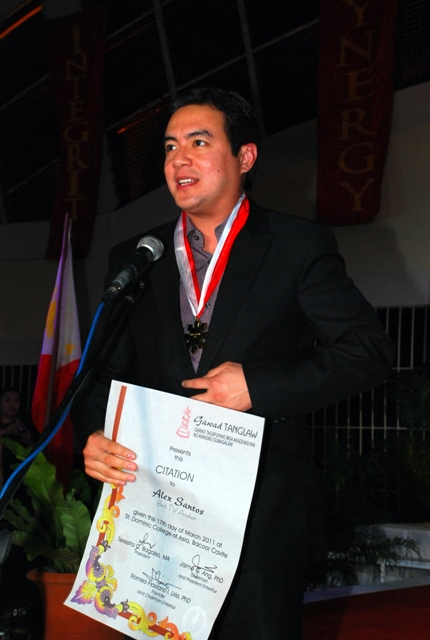
Alex Santos (newscaster)

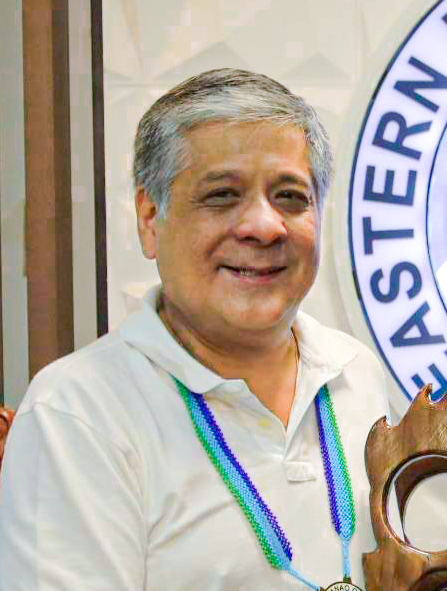
Antonio Lagdameo, Jr.

== See also ==
- List of people from Davao del Sur
