= Davaoeño =

Davaoeño, Davaweño, Davawenyo or Dabawenyo may refer to:

- the permanent residents of the Davao Region,
- the Davaoeño language.
