= Romeo (disambiguation) =

Romeo is the male protagonist in the play Romeo and Juliet.

Romeo may also refer to:

== People and fictional characters ==
- Romeo (given name), including a list of people and fictional characters
- Romeo (surname), a list of people
- nickname of Aditya Dev (1988–2012), Indian body builder, entertainer and dancer and the "world's smallest bodybuilder"
- Kid Romeo, American professional wrestler
- Max Romeo, Jamaican reggae
- A term for a man who wants sexual relationships with many different people

== Places ==
=== United States ===
- Romeo, Colorado, a statutory town
- Romeo, Florida, an unincorporated community
- Romeo, Michigan, a village
- Romeo, Tennessee, an unincorporated community
- Romeoville, Illinois, a village originally settled as Romeo

=== Antarctica ===
- Romeo Island

=== Outer space ===
- Romeo (lunar crater), a lunar crater
- Romeo, a crater on Oberon

== Music ==
- Romeo Records, an American jazz record label
- Romeo (English rapper) (born 1980), English rapper and MC
- Romeo, stage name of Romeo Miller, an American rapper and actor
- Romeo (band), a South Korean boy band
- Romeo Z, a 1960s English club band
- Romeo (EP), a 2009 EP by Shinee

=== Songs ===
- "Romeo" (Basement Jaxx song), 2001
- "Romeo" (Dino song), 1990
- "Romeo" (Dolly Parton song), 1993
- "Romeo" (Dove Cameron song), 2025
- "Romeo" (Ketil Stokkan song), 1986
- "Romeo" (Petula Clark song), 1961
- "Romeo" (Wipers song), 1981
- "Romeo", by Bladee from Eversince, 2016
- "Romeo", by Donna Summer from I'm a Rainbow, 1996
- "Romeo", by Gabi DeMartino from Paintings of Me, 2022
- "Romeo", by Hande Yener, from Nasıl Delirdim?, 2007
- "Romeo", by Jungle featuring Bas, 2021
- "Romeo", by Mr Big, 1977
- "Romeo", by PinkPantheress from Fancy That, 2025
- "Romeo", by Sublime from Second-hand Smoke, 1997

== Film and television ==
- Romeo (1976 film), a Malayalam film
- Romeo (1990 film), a Dutch drama
- Romeo (2007 film), a Malayalam film
- Parugu or Romeo, a 2008 Telugu film
- Romeo (2011 film), a Bengali film
- Romeo (2012 film), a Kannada-language film
- Romeo (2014 film), a Telugu-language film
- Romeo (2024 film), a Tamil-language film
- Romeo S3, a Hindi-language film
- Romeo!, a Nickelodeon television series starring Romeo Miller that aired from 2003 to 2006

== Military ==
- Romeo class submarine, the NATO reporting name for a Soviet submarine type
- Operation Romeo, a French World War II commando operation
- Fokker C.V, a Dutch reconnaissance and light bomber biplane manufactured in Italy under licence as the Romeo Ro.1
- USS Romeo, a Union tinclad during the American Civil War

== Other uses ==
- Romeo (social network), a website and mobile app for gay, bisexual, queer and transgender people, founded as GayRomeo in 2002 and operating as PlanetRomeo from 2011 to 2021
- Romeo, the letter R in the ICAO spelling alphabet
- Alfa Romeo Romeo, a light van and pickup truck formerly produced by Alfa Romeo
- Romeo file system, an extension to the ISO 9660 file system for optical media
- RoMEO, Rights MEtadata for Open archiving
- Romeo (wolf) (c. 2003–2009), Alaskan wolf notable for interactions with humans
- Romeo State Airport, a public airport near Romeo, Michigan
- The "Romeo" method is a form of victim grooming for the purposes of pimping; see Procuring (prostitution)#Grooming

== See also ==
- Romeoo, a 2007 Malayalam film directed by Rafi Mecartin
- Roamio, the name of a series of TiVo digital video recorders
- Romero
