= Romeu =

== Given name ==
Romeu is a Portuguese masculine given name, a variant of Romeo.

People with this name include:

- Romeu Almeida (born 1974), retired Portuguese footballer
- Romeu Beltrão (1913–1977), Brazilian physician, educator, historian and paleontologist
- Romeu Evangelista (born 1950), retired Brazilian footballer
- Romeu Filemón (born 1965), Angolan football manager
- Romeu Italo Ripoli (1916–1983), Brazilian agronomist, businessman, politician and sports manager
- Romeu Pellicciari (1911–1971), Brazilian footballer
- Romeu Pereira dos Santos (born 1985), Brazilian footballer
- Romeu Ribeiro (born 1989), Portuguese footballer
- Romeu Rocha (born 1986), Portuguese footballer
- Romeu Torres (born 1984), Portuguese footballer
- Romeu Tuma (1931–2010), Brazilian politician
- Romeu Silva (born 1954), retired Portuguese footballer
- Romeu Zema (born 1964), Brazilian politician (current governor of Minas Gerais)

== Surname ==
Romeu can be also a Catalan-language surname. People with this surname include:

- Antonio María Romeu (1876–1955), Cuban pianist
- Armando de Sequeira Romeu, Cuban musician
- Claudia Dasca Romeu (born 1994), Spanish swimmer
- David Balaguer Romeu (born 1991), Spanish handball player
- Emma Romeu, Cuban writer and geographer
- Fábio Santos, full name Fábio Santos Romeu (born 1985), Brazilian footballer
- Inês Etienne Romeu (1942–2015), Brazilian political prisoner
- Jean-Pierre Romeu (born 1948), former French rugby union footballer
- José Antonio Roméu (1742?-1792), the sixth Spanish governor of Alta California
- Leonora Milà Romeu (born 1942), Spanish pianist and composer
- Oriol Romeu (born 1991), Spanish footballer
- Pere Romeu (born 1993), Spanish football coach
- Xavier Romeu, Puerto Rican counselor and litigator

== Other ==
- Romeu (cartoonist), Spanish cartoonist
- Arboretum de Font-Romeu, an arboretum in France
- Camerata Romeu, an all-female instrumentalist chamber music group of Cuban origin
- Font-Romeu-Odeillo-Via, a commune in France
