= 2010 Africa Cup of Nations Group B =

Football tournament group stage

Group B was one of four groups of national teams competing at the 2010 Africa Cup of Nations. The group's first round of matches began on January 11 and its last matches were played on January 19. Most matches were played at the Estádio Chimandela in Cabinda and featured Ivory Coast, joined by Ghana and Burkina Faso. Togo pulled out before the opening game because of the attack on their team bus.

== Standings ==
Pos	Team	Pld	W	D	L	GF	GA	GD	Pts	Qualification
1	Ivory Coast	2	1	1	0	3	1	+2	4	Advance to knockout stage
2	Ghana	2	1	0	1	2	3	−1	3	Advance to knockout stage
3	Burkina Faso	2	0	1	1	0	1	−1	1	
4	Togo (D)	0	0	0	0	0	0	0	0 (Note: Togo withdrew from the tournament due to the attack on their team bus while traveling to their opening match against Ghana, thus they were officially disqualified. Group B became a three-team group.)	

Source: CAF
(D) Disqualified

== Ivory Coast vs Burkina Faso ==
11 January 2010
17:00

Ivory Coast	0–0	Burkina Faso
	Report

Estádio Nacional do Chiazi, Cabinda
Attendance: 5,000
Referee: Kacem Bennaceur (Tunisia)

GK	1	Boubacar Barry
DF	4	Kolo Touré
DF	21	Emmanuel Eboué
DF	22	Sol Bamba
MF	17	Siaka Tiéné
MF	6	Yaya Touré	(yellow card) 71'
MF	5	Didier Zokora
MF	9	Cheick Tioté		(substituted off) 81'
FW	11	Didier Drogba
FW	14	Bakari Koné		(substituted off) 69'
FW	10	Gervinho		(substituted off) 73'
Substitutions:
MF	18	Abdul Kader Keïta		(substituted on) 69'
FW	8	Salomon Kalou		(substituted on) 73'
FW	15	Aruna Dindane		(substituted on) 81'
Manager:
(Bosnia and Herzegovina) Vahid Halilhodžić

GK	1	Daouda Diakité
DF	6	Bakary Koné
DF	4	Mamadou Tall
DF	17	Paul Koulibaly	(yellow card) 26'	(substituted off) 46'
DF	8	Mahamoudou Kéré
DF	12	Saïdou Panandétiguiri	(yellow card) 74'
MF	7	Florent Rouamba
MF	18	Charles Kaboré
MF	15	Narcisse Yaméogo		(substituted off) 62'
FW	11	Jonathan Pitroipa
FW	9	Moumouni Dagano		(substituted off) 81'
Substitutions:
DF	3	Ibrahim Gnanou		(substituted on) 46'
FW	21	Habib Bamogo		(substituted on) 62'
FW	19	Yssouf Koné		(substituted on) 81'
Manager:
(Portugal) Paulo Duarte

== Ghana vs Togo ==
11 January 2010
19:30

Ghana	Cancelled	Togo

Estádio do Chiazi, Cabinda

== Burkina Faso vs Togo ==
15 January 2010
17:00

Burkina Faso	Cancelled	Togo

Estádio do Chiazi, Cabinda

== Ivory Coast vs Ghana ==
15 January 2010
19:30

Ivory Coast	3–1	Ghana
Gervinho 23'; Tiéné 66'; Drogba 90'	Report	Gyan 90+3' (pen.)

Estádio Nacional do Chiazi, Cabinda
Attendance: 23,000
Referee: Jerome Damon (South Africa)

GK	1	Boubacar Barry	(yellow card) 90+4'
DF	4	Kolo Touré
DF	21	Emmanuel Eboué	(red card) 55'
DF	22	Sol Bamba
MF	17	Siaka Tiéné
MF	6	Yaya Touré		(substituted off) 71'
MF	5	Didier Zokora	(yellow card) 53'
MF	9	Cheick Tioté	(yellow card) 37'
FW	11	Didier Drogba
FW	8	Salomon Kalou	(yellow card) 76'	(substituted off) 84'
FW	10	Gervinho		(substituted off) 60'
Substitutions:
MF	18	Abdul Kader Keïta		(substituted on) 69'
FW	8	Salomon Kalou		(substituted on) 73'
FW	15	Aruna Dindane		(substituted on) 81'
Manager:
(Bosnia and Herzegovina) Vahid Halilhodžić

GK	22	Richard Kingson
DF	18	Eric Addo
DF	15	Isaac Vorsah
DF	7	Samuel Inkoom
MF	11	Moussa Narry		(substituted off) 46'
MF	19	Emmanuel Agyemang-Badu
MF	17	Ibrahim Ayew
MF	13	André Ayew		(substituted off) 46'
MF	10	Kwadwo Asamoah
FW	11	Agyemang Opoku	(yellow card) 42'	(substituted off) 77'
FW	14	Matthew Amoah
Substitutions:
MF	8	Michael Essien		(substituted on) 46'
FW	3	Asamoah Gyan		(substituted on) 46'
DF	21	Harrison Afful		(substituted on) 77'
Manager:
(Serbia) Milovan Rajevac

== Burkina Faso vs Ghana ==
19 January 2010
17:00

Burkina Faso	0–1	Ghana
	Report	A. Ayew 30'

Estádio 11 de Novembro, Luanda
Attendance: 8,000
Referee: Eddy Maillet (Seychelles)

GK	1	Daouda Diakité
DF	6	Bakary Koné
DF	4	Mamadou Tall	(yellow card) 16' (yellow-red card) 66'
DF	17	Paul Koulibaly		(substituted off) 83'
DF	8	Mahamoudou Kéré
DF	12	Saïdou Panandétiguiri	(yellow card) 30'
MF	7	Florent Rouamba
MF	18	Charles Kaboré		(substituted off) 59'
FW	11	Jonathan Pitroipa
FW	19	Yssouf Koné
FW	21	Habib Bamogo	(yellow card) 13'	(substituted off) 72'
Substitutions:
MF	23	Wilfried Balima		(substituted on) 59'
FW	9	Moumouni Dagano		(substituted on) 72'
MF	5	Mohamed Koffi		(substituted on) 83'
Manager:
(Portugal) Paulo Duarte

GK	22	Richard Kingson
MF	2	Hans Sarpei	(yellow card) 34'
DF	12	Lee Addy
DF	15	Isaac Vorsah
DF	7	Samuel Inkoom
MF	19	Emmanuel Agyemang-Badu	(yellow card) 64'
MF	23	Haminu Draman		(substituted off) 90+4'
MF	13	André Ayew
MF	10	Kwadwo Asamoah
FW	3	Asamoah Gyan		(substituted off) 87'
FW	14	Matthew Amoah		(substituted off) 77'
Substitutions:
FW	20	Dominic Adiyiah		(substituted on) 77'
MF	17	Ibrahim Ayew		(substituted on) 87'
FW	11	Agyemang Opoku		(substituted on) 90+4'
Manager:
(Serbia) Milovan Rajevac

== Ivory Coast vs Togo ==
19 January 2010
17:00

Ivory Coast	Cancelled	Togo

Estádio do Chiazi, Cabinda
