= Siaka Tiéné =

Ivorian footballer (born 1982)

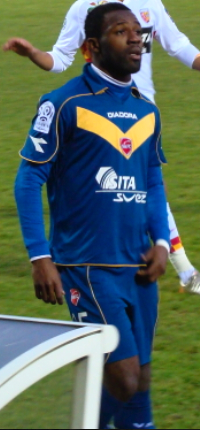
- Tiené in 2009

Personal information
- Full name: Siaka Tiéné
- Date of birth: 22 February 1982 (age 44)
- Place of birth: Abidjan, Ivory Coast
- Height: 1.76 m (5 ft 9 in)
- Position: Left-back

Youth career
- ASEC Mimosas

Senior career*
Years	Team	Apps	(Gls)
1999–2003	ASEC Mimosas		
2003–2005	Mamelodi Sundowns	46	(14)
2005–2008	Saint-Étienne	21	(0)
2006–2007	→ Stade Reims (loan)	18	(3)
2008–2010	Valenciennes	57	(2)
2010–2013	Paris Saint-Germain	54	(1)
2013–2015	Montpellier	44	(5)
Total		240	(25)

International career
2000–2015	Ivory Coast	96	(2)
- * Club domestic league appearances and goals

Siaka Tiéné (born 22 February 1982) is an Ivorian former professional footballer who primarily played as a left-back. Having begun at ASEC Mimosas in his native Ivory Coast and Mamelodi Sundowns in South Africa, he went on to spend most of his professional career in France.

He amassed 96 appearances scoring twice for the Ivory Coast national team and was part of the squads at seven Africa Cup of Nations tournaments (2002, 2006, 2008, 2010, 2012, 2013, and 2015) and at the 2010 FIFA World Cup.

== Club career ==
Tiéné started his career at homeland club ASEC Abidjan, where he came through the famed youth academy that has produced many of the Ivory Coast national team of today, before he eventually moved abroad to play in the South African Premier Soccer League for Mamelodi Sundowns.

In the summer of 2005, he made the move to Europe to play for French Ligue 1 club Saint-Étienne, where he stayed until October 2006. He joined Ligue 2 side Stade de Reims on loan after being unable to get a place in the Saint-Étienne midfield. He returned to Saint-Étienne during the summer of 2007.

In June 2010, Tiéné signed a contract with Paris Saint-Germain, where he played for three years. He did not return to Paris after winning the Ligue 1 domestic title in 2012–13.

In June 2013, Tiéné signed a contract with Montpellier. He was released in July 2015, having made 44 league appearances over the course of two seasons.

== International career ==
Tiéné has had a distinguished international career with over 95 caps for the Ivory Coast, representing the team at the 2010 FIFA World Cup and at seven Africa Cup of Nations in 2002, 2006, 2008, 2010, 2012, 2013 and 2015, helping them finish runner-up in 2006 and 2012, while captaining them to victory in 2015.

He was a member of the Ivorian squad for the 2006 African Cup of Nations tournament in Egypt, where the Elephants reached the final. Tiéné was the only player in the Ivorian's African Cup of Nations team not to make it into the 2006 FIFA World Cup squad. He was called up for the Ivory Coast's 2010 African Cup of Nations campaign in Angola. He was head coach Vahid Halilhodžić's first-choice left-back instead of Arthur Boka in the first match at Group B in Cabinda on 11 January, a 0–0 draw against Burkina Faso, and later in the competition.

== Career statistics ==
=== International ===
Appearances and goals by national team and year
National team	Year	Apps	Goals
Ivory Coast	2000	4	0
Ivory Coast	2001	8	0
Ivory Coast	2002	1	0
Ivory Coast	2003	0	0
Ivory Coast	2004	0	0
Ivory Coast	2005	8	0
Ivory Coast	2006	2	0
Ivory Coast	2007	9	0
Ivory Coast	2008	10	0
Ivory Coast	2009	6	1
Ivory Coast	2010	12	1
Ivory Coast	2011	5	0
Ivory Coast	2012	12	0
Ivory Coast	2013	5	0
Ivory Coast	2014	4	0
Ivory Coast	2015	10	0
Total		96	2

=== International goals ===
Scores and results list Ivory Coast's goal tally first, score column indicates score after each Tiéné goal.

List of international goals scored by Siaka Tiéné
No.	Date	Venue	Opponent	Score	Result	Competition
1	14 November 2009	Stade Félix Houphouët-Boigny, Abidjan, Ivory Coast	Guinea	3–0	3–0	2010 FIFA World Cup qualification
2	15 January 2010	Estádio Chimandela, Cabinda, Angola	Ghana	2–0	3–1	2010 Africa Cup of Nations

== Honours ==
Paris Saint-Germain

- Ligue 1: 2012–13

Ivory Coast

- Africa Cup of Nations: 2015

Individual

- Africa Cup of Nations Team of the Tournament: 2013

== See also ==
- List of men's footballers with 100 or more international caps
