= Gervinho =

Ivorian footballer (born 1987)

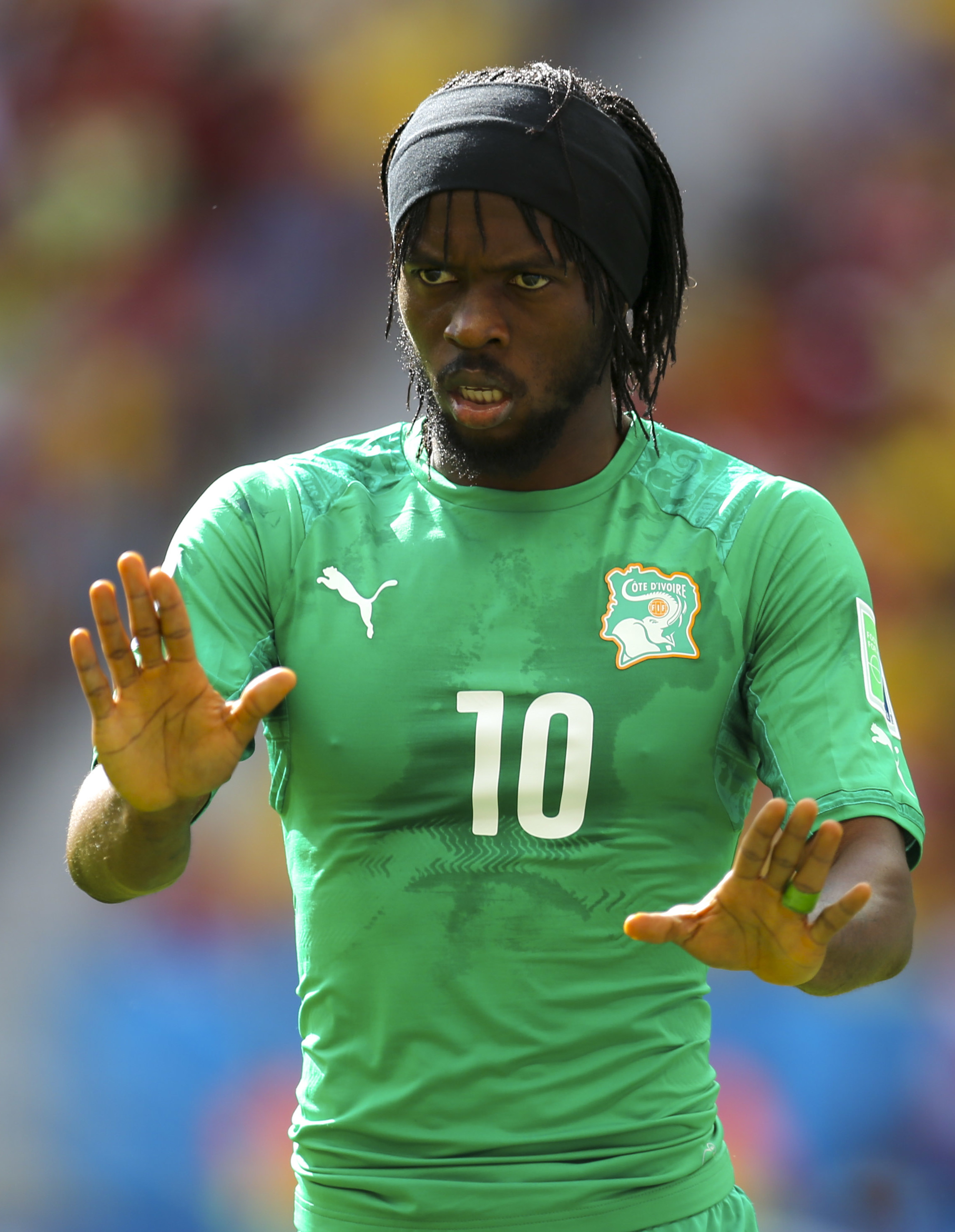
- Gervinho with the Ivory Coast at the 2014 FIFA World Cup

Personal information
- Full name: Gervais Lombe Yao Kouassi
- Date of birth: 27 May 1987 (age 39)
- Place of birth: Anyama, Ivory Coast
- Height: 1.79 m (5 ft 10 in)
- Positions: Left winger; forward

Youth career
- 1998–2002: ASEC Mimosas Abidjan
- 2002–2004: Toumodi
- 2004–2005: Beveren

Senior career*
Years	Team	Apps	(Gls)
2005–2007	Beveren	61	(14)
2007–2009	Le Mans	59	(9)
2009–2011	Lille	67	(28)
2011–2013	Arsenal	46	(9)
2013–2016	Roma	71	(17)
2016–2018	Hebei China Fortune	29	(4)
2018–2021	Parma	88	(23)
2021–2022	Trabzonspor	9	(2)
2022–2023	Aris	11	(1)
Total		441	(107)

International career
2008	Ivory Coast U23	4	(1)
2007–2021	Ivory Coast	88	(23)
Medal record
Representing Ivory Coast
Men's football
Africa Cup of Nations
Winner	2015 Equatorial Guinea
Runner-up	2012 Equatorial Guinea-Gabon
- * Club domestic league appearances and goals

Gervais Lombe Yao Kouassi (born 27 May 1987), known as Gervinho, is an Ivorian former professional footballer who played as a forward.

Gervinho began his career at ASEC Abidjan and Toumodi, before moving to Belgium in 2004 to play for Beveren. Between 2007 and 2011, he played in the French Ligue 1, initially at Le Mans and then at Lille. In his final season in France, he helped his club win the league and the Coupe de France. He was sold to Arsenal in 2011 for £10.8 million and moved to Roma in 2013 for €8 million. In January 2016, Gervinho moved to Hebei China Fortune. In August 2018, he joined Parma.

Internationally, Gervinho represented the Ivory Coast. He made over 80 appearances for the national team from his debut in 2007 until 2021, scoring 23 goals. He was part of the squad at five Africa Cup of Nations tournaments and two World Cups.

== Club career ==
=== Early career ===
Gervinho was born in Anyama, Ivory Coast. He began his career in the famed ASEC Abidjan youth academy, where he spent five years. At ASEC Abidjan, he was given the Brazilian Portuguese style nickname "Gervinho", derived from his first name Gervais, by the Brazilian coach who trained ASEC Abidjan. The suffix "-inho", in Portuguese, denotes smallness and/or affection, in this case, effectively meaning "Little Gervais".

Following this, he moved to Ivorian Deuxieme Division Zone Four side Toumodi F.C., where he turned professional.

=== Beveren ===
Gervinho played for two seasons at Belgian side KSK Beveren, where he made 61 appearances for the club and scored 14 goals.

=== Le Mans ===
At the end of the 2006–07 season Gervinho moved to Ligue 1 side Le Mans, where he played alongside Ivorian international midfielder Romaric. He scored two goals in his debut season in Ligue 1, with one of them coming against Nancy. Gervinho scored 9 times in 59 Ligue 1 appearances over two seasons with the French side.

=== Lille ===
On 21 July 2009, Gervinho joined Lille for a reported fee of about €6 million (US$8.5 million) on a three-year contract. He scored 13 times in 32 appearances in his debut season for the club. His first goal for Lille came in a 3–2 victory away to Boulogne on 4 October 2009.

Gervinho had an even more successful second season with Lille. He scored 18 goals in all competitions, 15 in Ligue 1, to help Lille win the Ligue 1 for the first time in 56 years. His side were also crowned Coupe de France champions, with Gervinho scoring a goal in the 2–0 semi-final victory over Nice on 20 April. At the end of the season, Gervinho was linked with clubs like Arsenal, Paris Saint-Germain, Atlético Madrid and Newcastle United.

=== Arsenal ===
==== 2011–12 ====
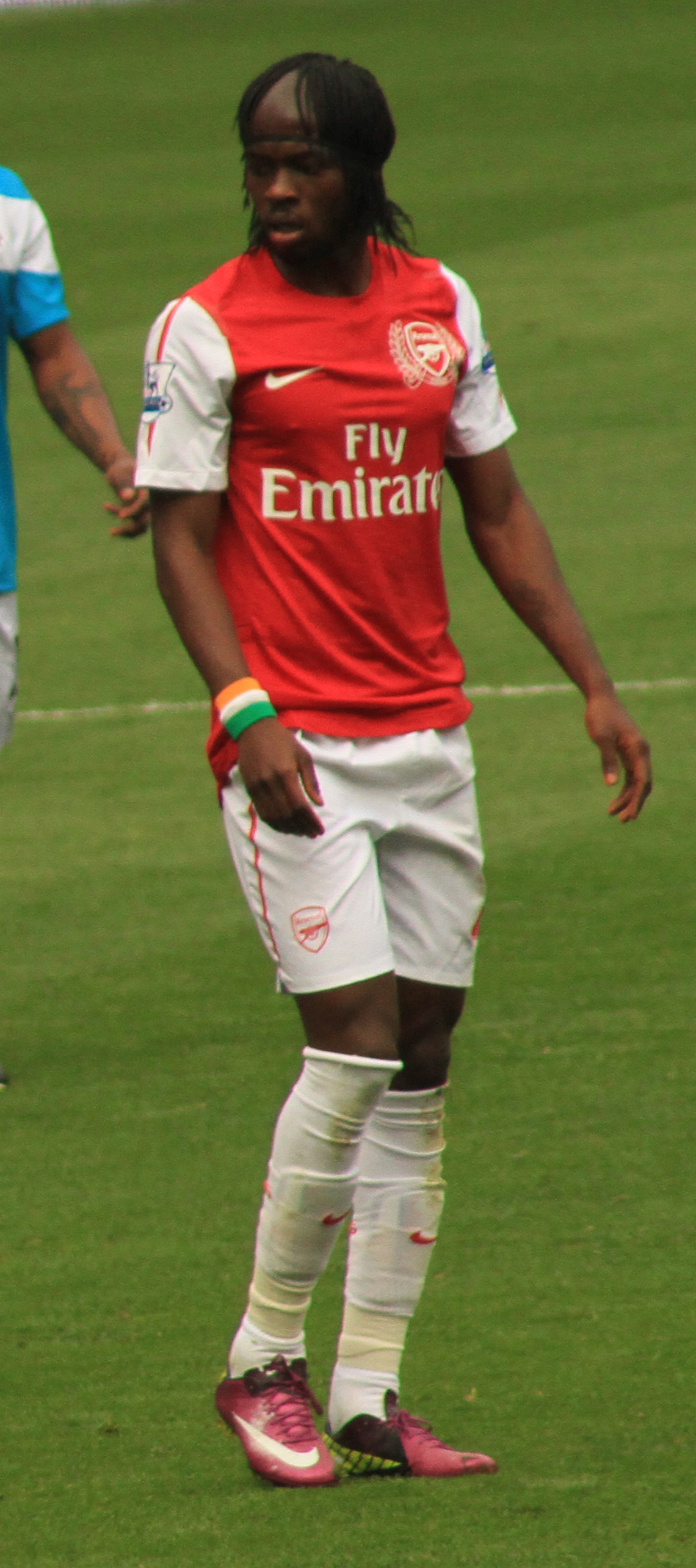
Gervinho playing against Sunderland

On 12 July 2011, Gervinho completed a transfer from Lille to Arsenal for a fee believed to be around £10.8 million. He was given the number 27 shirt, which was last worn by Ivory Coast teammate Emmanuel Eboué who was already on the verge of leaving the club. He made his debut in a pre-season friendly match against 1. FC Köln, in which he scored a brace within the first 15 minutes. He was sent off on his Premier League debut against Newcastle United for slapping Joey Barton. The game finished 0–0. This resulted in a standard three-match ban for violent conduct. Alan Pardew (manager of Newcastle United) accused Gervinho of diving when Cheick Tioté challenged him inside the box.

Gervinho scored his first league goal in a 4–3 loss to Blackburn Rovers. On 23 October 2011, he followed this up by contributing to all three goals in Arsenal's 3–1 win over Stoke City, scoring the first and assisting both of Robin van Persie's goals. He then scored his third goal for Arsenal on 3 December 2011, in a 4–0 win at Wigan Athletic, scoring the third goal of the match in a comfortable victory. He scored his fourth goal of his time at Arsenal on 27 December 2011 in the 1–1 draw against Wolves. Gervinho then departed for the Africa Cup of Nations after a 2–1 defeat to Fulham. He made his return on 18 February 2012 in the FA Cup match against Sunderland which ended in a 2–0 defeat that knocked Arsenal out of the 2011–12 FA Cup.

==== 2012–13 ====
Gervinho played in three of the first four league games of the season and scored a double in the 6–1 home victory over Southampton on 15 September. He scored his first Champions League goal of the new season in a 2–1 victory over Ligue 1 champions Montpellier on 18 September.

On 16 March, Gervinho sealed a 2–0 win at Swansea City by scoring his first goal for Arsenal since September. On 30 March, he scored a goal and assisted two others as Arsenal beat Reading 4–1 and was named as man of the match.

=== Roma ===
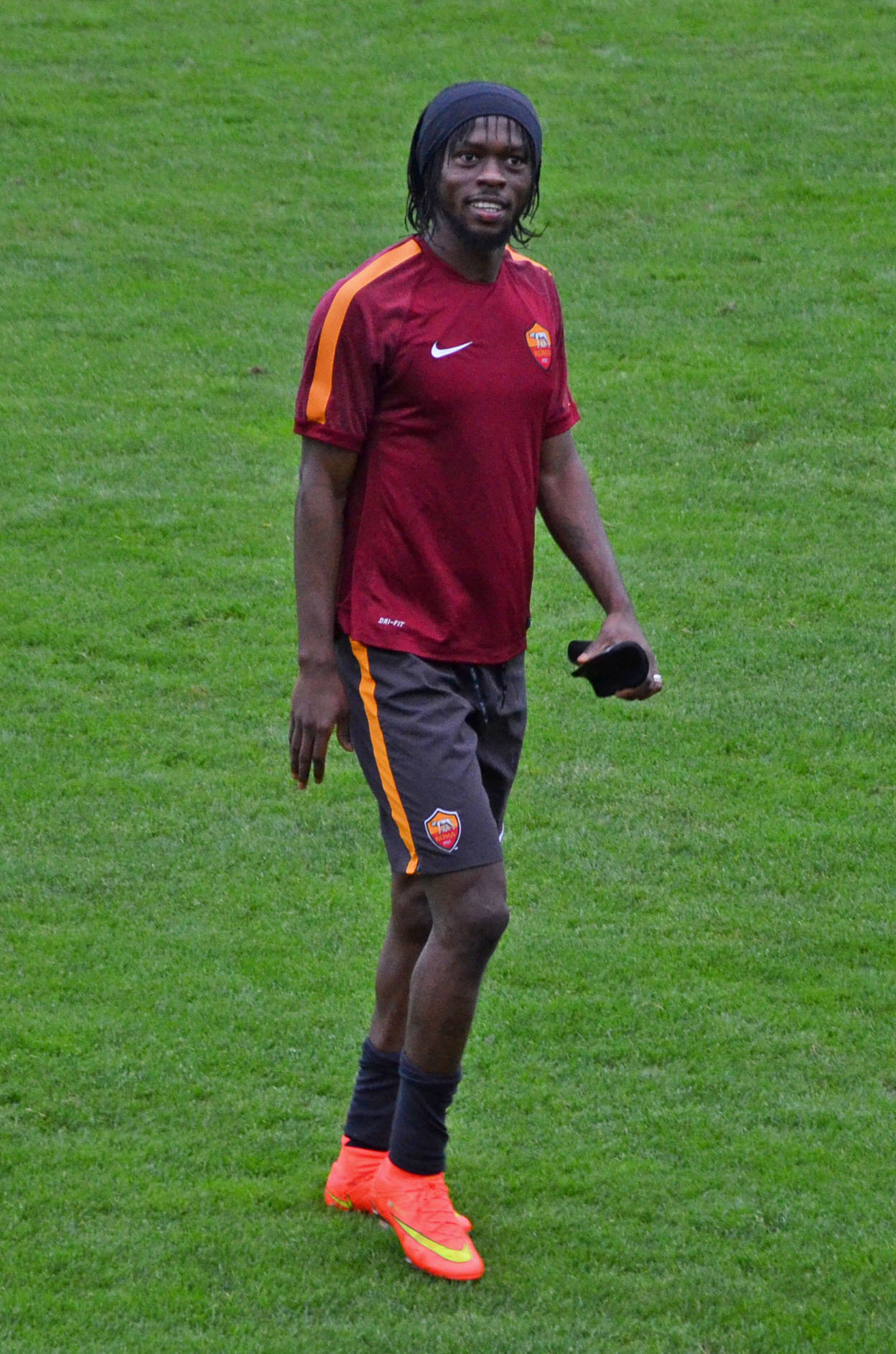
Gervinho with Roma in 2014

On 8 August 2013, Arsenal sold Gervinho to Italian club Roma for €8 million. He made his first appearance for Roma as a substitute against Livorno on 25 August. It took until 25 September for Gervinho to score his first official goal for Roma, finishing from close range after an assist from Francesco Totti, which sealed a 2–0 defeat of Sampdoria. In the following Serie A match, he helped Roma record six straight victories to begin the season by netting two goals in their 5–0 defeat of Bologna.

In the quarter-final round of the Coppa Italia on 21 January 2014, Gervinho netted the game's only goal with an acrobatic finish from a Kevin Strootman pass to advance past Juventus and into the semi-finals. In the first leg of their semi-final tie with Napoli on 5 February, Gervinho netted twice, including a late game-winning goal to send Roma into the second leg with a 3–2 advantage.

On 30 August 2014, Gervinho scored in the Roma's second goal in a 2–0 win over Fiorentina to start the 2014–15 season. He scored his first goals in European competition for Roma on 17 September 2014, netting twice in the 5–1 Champions League group stage victory over CSKA Moscow.

=== Hebei China Fortune ===
In January 2016, Gervinho moved to newly promoted Chinese Super League team Hebei China Fortune for a reported initial fee of €18 million. On 4 March 2016, he scored on his competitive debut in a 1–2 away win against Guangzhou R&F on the opening game of the 2016 Chinese Super League.

In October 2016, Gervinho ruptured the ligaments in his left knee whilst in training for Hebei China Fortune. As a result of this, he missed the 2017 Africa Cup of Nations.

=== Parma ===
On 17 August 2018, Gervinho returned to Serie A by signing for Parma alongside his former Roma teammate Salih Uçan. He made his Parma debut as a substitute in a 1–0 away loss to S.P.A.L. nine days later, and on 1 September he scored on his first start for the club, a 2–1 home defeat to reigning champions Juventus. Three weeks afterwards, he scored a "staggering goal" in a 2–0 home win over Cagliari by running with the ball up the whole pitch. On 19 January 2019, he scored a game winner in a 2–1 victory over Udinese. On 2 February, he scored twice to earn a draw for Parma against Juventus in a 3–3 draw.

In October 2019 he extended his contract with Parma until 30 June 2022.

=== Trabzonspor ===
Shortly after Parma was relegated from Serie A, on 26 May 2021, it was announced that Gervinho had joined Turkish side Trabzonspor on a permanent basis. He scored on his Süper Lig debut for the club, a 5–1 win over Yeni Malatyaspor on 16 August.

=== Aris Thessaloniki ===
On 15 July 2022, he signed for Aris in Super League Greece.

== International career ==
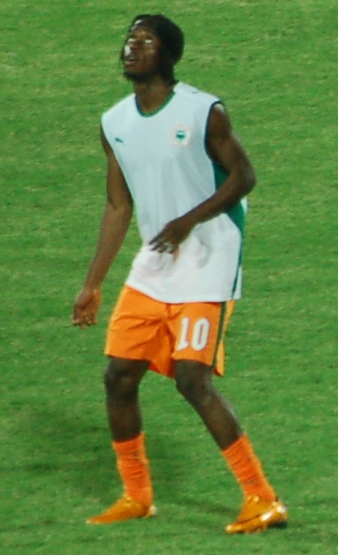
Gervinho warming up before a match at the 2008 Africa Cup of Nations

Gervinho captained Ivory Coast at U23 level.

He was named in the Ivorian senior squad for the first time for the friendlies against Angola and Qatar in November 2007, and was picked for the Ivorian squad for their 2008 African Cup of Nations campaign in Ghana where he was given the number 10 shirt. He made his competitive debut for the Ivorian club during the 2008 Nations Cup where he made two substitute appearances.

He represented his country at the 2008 Olympic tournament where he was captain. After Ivory Coast lost to Argentina in the first match, Gervinho scored one goal and set up two others in a 4–2 victory over Serbia.

=== Africa Cup of Nations ===
==== 2010 ====
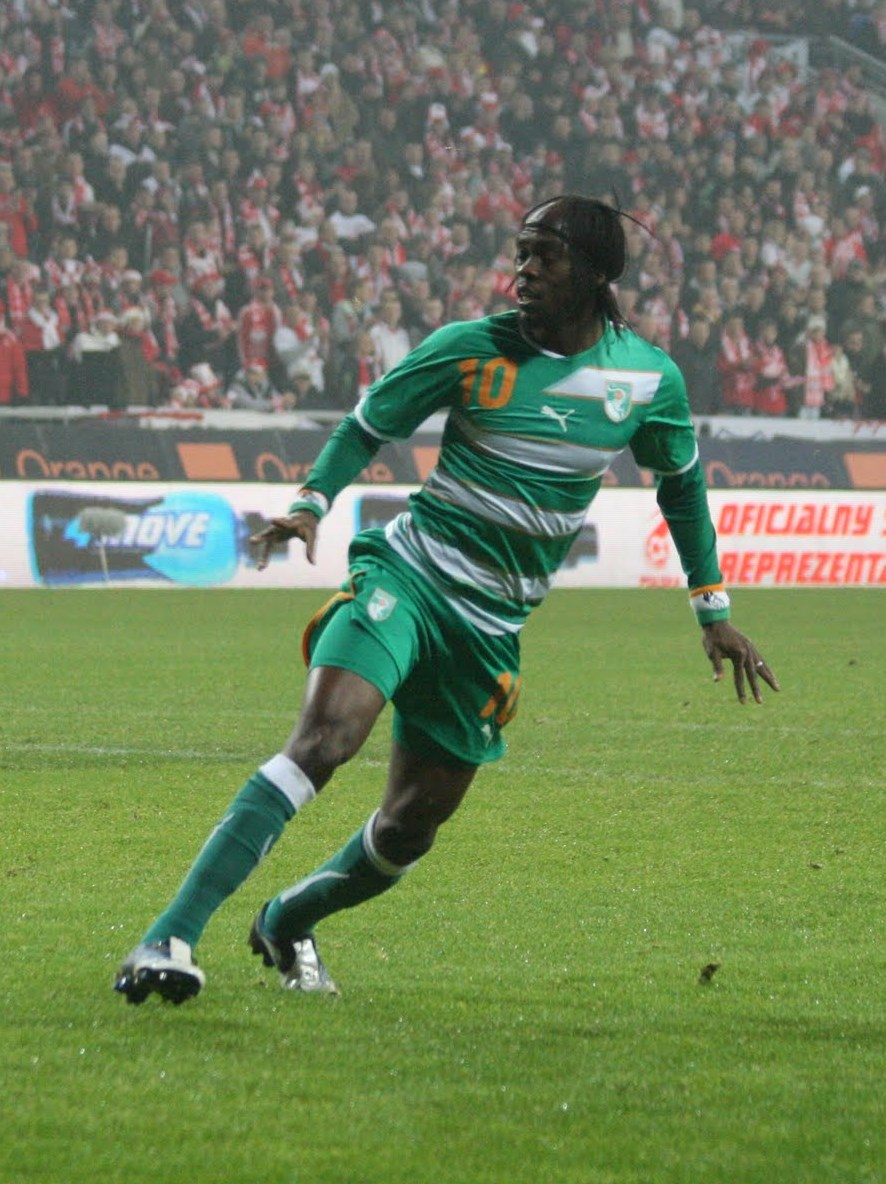
Gervinho in 2010

On 15 January 2010, Gervinho scored his third international goal in the African Nations Cup group stage game against Ghana. He made a total of three appearances in the tournament, scoring once.

==== 2012 ====
Gervinho missed a sudden-death penalty in the shoot-out at the 2012 Africa Cup of Nations Final, after which Stopila Sunzu scored to win the tournament for Zambia.

==== 2015 ====
In the Ivory Coast's opening match at the 2015 Africa Cup of Nations in Equatorial Guinea, Gervinho was sent off for striking Guinea's Naby Keïta during a 1–1 draw at the Estadio de Malabo. He was given a two-match ban for the incident. Gervinho returned for the Ivory Coast's quarter-final against Algeria, scoring the last goal of a 3–1 win, and also netted in a semi-final victory of the same score against the DR Congo.

=== FIFA World Cup ===
==== 2010 ====
Gervinho made only three appearances, all as a substitute, in qualifying for the 2010 World Cup but still scored twice. On 15 June 2010, he played his first match in a World Cup. He played 82 minutes in Ivory Coast's opening match in Group G against Portugal, which ended 0–0. In total he made three appearances in the World Cup.

==== 2014 ====
Gervinho was included in Ivory Coast's 23-man squad for the 2014 FIFA World Cup. In their first group match against Japan, he scored the team's winning goal from Serge Aurier's cross in a 2–1 win. In the next match, he scored the only goal for Les Éléphants as they were defeated 2–1 by Colombia in Brasília.

== Style of play ==
Gervinho is generally deployed as a forward, more often on the wing, and takes a more attacking role than a typical midfielder. A quick, powerful, energetic, and agile player, he possesses good ball control and dribbling skills, which, coupled with his short, fast bursts of pace and sudden changes of direction, lead him to be considered a very direct player. Playing from the left allows him to cut in onto his favoured right foot to shoot. Although in a 4–4–2 formation, Gervinho can take on a more central role, but for both club and country is often utilized on either wing in a 4–3–3 formation.

Rudi Garcia, who managed Gervinho at Lille and Roma, has described him as a player who needs confidence and who makes opportunities for his teammates.

== Personal life ==
Gervinho's younger brother Hubert Yao is also a professional footballer.

== Career statistics ==
=== Club ===
Appearances and goals by club, season and competition
Club	Season	League			National cup (Note: Includes Coupe de France, FA Cup, Coppa Italia)		League cup (Note: Includes Coupe de la Ligue, Football League Cup)		Continental		Total	
Club	Season	Division	Apps	Goals	Apps	Goals	Apps	Goals	Apps	Goals	Apps	Goals
Beveren	2005–06	Belgian First Division	32	6	0	0	—		—		32	6
Beveren	2006–07	Belgian First Division	29	8	0	0	—		—		29	8
Beveren	Total		61	14	0	0	0	0	0	0	61	14
Le Mans	2007–08	Ligue 1	26	2	1	1	3	3	—		30	6
Le Mans	2008–09	Ligue 1	33	7	3	0	1	1	—		37	8
Le Mans	Total		59	9	4	1	4	4	0	0	67	14
Lille	2009–10	Ligue 1	32	13	0	0	0	0	11 (Note: Appearances in UEFA Europa League)	5	43	18
Lille	2010–11	Ligue 1	35	15	6	2	2	1	7	0	50	18
Lille	Total		67	28	6	2	2	1	18	5	93	36
Arsenal	2011–12	Premier League	28	4	1	0	1	0	7 (Note: Appearances in UEFA Champions League)	0	37	4
Arsenal	2012–13	Premier League	18	5	1	0	1	0	6	2	26	7
Arsenal	Total		46	9	2	0	2	0	13	2	63	11
Roma	2013–14	Serie A	33	9	4	3	—		—		37	12
Roma	2014–15	Serie A	24	2	0	0	—		10 (Note: Six appearances and three goals in UEFA Champions League, four appearances and two goals in UEFA Europa League)	5	34	7
Roma	2015–16	Serie A	14	6	0	0	—		3	1	17	7
Roma	Total		71	17	4	3	0	0	13	6	88	26
Hebei China Fortune	2016	Chinese Super League	18	3	0	0	—		—		18	3
Hebei China Fortune	2017	Chinese Super League	4	1	0	0	—		—		4	1
Hebei China Fortune	2018	Chinese Super League	7	0	0	0	—		—		7	0
Hebei China Fortune	Total		29	4	0	0	0	0	0	0	29	4
Parma	2018–19	Serie A	30	11	0	0	—		—		30	11
Parma	2019–20	Serie A	31	7	1	2	—		—		32	9
Parma	2020–21	Serie A	27	5	0	0	—		—		27	5
Parma	Total		88	23	1	2	0	0	0	0	89	25
Trabzonspor	2021–22	Süper Lig	9	2	0	0	—		4 (Note: Appearances in UEFA Europa Conference League)	0	13	2
Aris	2022–23	Super League Greece	11	1	0	0	—		0	0	11	1
Career total			441	107	17	8	8	5	48	13	514	133

=== International ===
Appearances and goals by national team and year
National team	Year	Apps	Goals
Ivory Coast	2007	1	0
Ivory Coast	2008	3	0
Ivory Coast	2009	6	2
Ivory Coast	2010	14	2
Ivory Coast	2011	7	3
Ivory Coast	2012	11	2
Ivory Coast	2013	10	4
Ivory Coast	2014	11	5
Ivory Coast	2015	12	2
Ivory Coast	2016	5	2
Ivory Coast	2017	4	0
Ivory Coast	2020	2	1
Ivory Coast	2021	2	0
Total		88	23

Scores and results list Ivory Coast's goal tally first, score column indicates score after each Gervinho goal.

List of international goals scored by Gervinho
No.	Date	Venue	Opponent	Score	Result	Competition
1	14 November 2009	Stade Félix Houphouët-Boigny, Abidjan, Ivory Coast	Guinea	1–0	3–0	2010 FIFA World Cup qualification
2	14 November 2009	Stade Félix Houphouët-Boigny, Abidjan, Ivory Coast	Guinea	2–0	3–0	2010 FIFA World Cup qualification
3	15 January 2010	Estádio Chimandela, Cabinda, Angola	Ghana	1–0	3–1	2010 Africa Cup of Nations
4	17 November 2010	Stadion Miejski, Poznań, Poland	Poland	1–1	1–3	Friendly
5	5 June 2011	Stade de l'Amitie, Cotonou, Benin	Benin	3–0	6–2	2012 Africa Cup of Nations qualification
6	5 June 2011	Stade de l'Amitie, Cotonou, Benin	Benin	5–2	6–2	2012 Africa Cup of Nations qualification
7	3 September 2011	Stade Amahoro, Kigali, Rwanda	Rwanda	5–0	5–0	2012 Africa Cup of Nations qualification
8	8 February 2012	Stade d'Angondjé, Libreville, Gabon	Mali	1–0	1–0	2012 Africa Cup of Nations
9	8 September 2012	Stade Félix Houphouët-Boigny, Abidjan, Ivory Coast	Senegal	2–2	4–2	2013 Africa Cup of Nations qualification
10	14 January 2013	Al Nahyan Stadium, Abu Dhabi, United Arab Emirates	Egypt	1–0	4–2	Friendly
11	14 January 2013	Al Nahyan Stadium, Abu Dhabi, United Arab Emirates	Egypt	3–1	4–2	Friendly
12	22 January 2013	Royal Bafokeng Stadium, Rustenburg, South Africa	Togo	2–1	2–1	2013 Africa Cup of Nations
13	26 January 2013	Royal Bafokeng Stadium, Rustenburg, South Africa	Tunisia	1–0	3–0	2013 Africa Cup of Nations
14	4 June 2014	Toyota Stadium, Texas, United States	El Salvador	1–0	2–1	Friendly
15	14 June 2014	Itaipava Arena Pernambuco, São Lourenço da Mata, Brazil	Japan	2–1	2–1	2014 FIFA World Cup
16	19 June 2014	Estádio Nacional Mané Garrincha, Brasília, Brazil	Colombia	1–2	1–2	2014 FIFA World Cup
17	6 September 2014	Stade Félix Houphouët-Boigny, Abidjan, Ivory Coast	Sierra Leone	2–1	2–1	2015 Africa Cup of Nations qualification
18	14 November 2014	Stade Félix Houphouët-Boigny, Abidjan, Ivory Coast	Sierra Leone	4–1	5–1	2015 Africa Cup of Nations qualification
19	1 February 2015	Estadio de Malabo, Malabo, Equatorial Guinea	Algeria	3–1	3–1	2015 Africa Cup of Nations
20	4 February 2015	Estadio de Bata, Bata, Equatorial Guinea	DR Congo	2–1	3–1	2015 Africa Cup of Nations
21	25 March 2016	Stade Félix Houphouët-Boigny, Abidjan, Ivory Coast	Sudan	1–0	1–0	2017 Africa Cup of Nations qualification
22	8 October 2016	Stade Bouaké, Bouaké, Ivory Coast	Mali	3–1	3–1	2018 FIFA World Cup qualification
23	12 November 2020	Stade National de la Côte d'Ivoire, Abidjan, Ivory Coast	Madagascar	1–0	2–1	2021 Africa Cup of Nations qualification

== Honours ==
Lille

- Ligue 1: 2010–11
- Coupe de France: 2010–11

Trabzonspor

- Süper Lig: 2021–22

Ivory Coast

- Africa Cup of Nations: 2015

Individual

- Prix Marc-Vivien Foé: 2009–10, 2010–11
- UNFP Ligue 1 Team of the Year: 2010–11
- Africa Cup of Nations Team of the Tournament: 2015
