= Phil. Macquet =

French painter (born 1967)

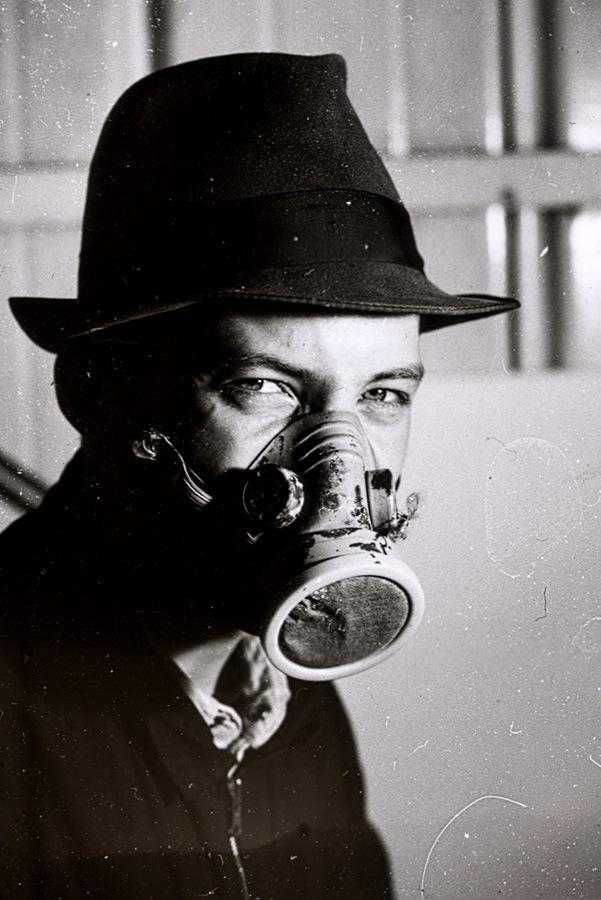
Phil Macquet

Phil. Macquet (born October 8, 1967, at Lille, France) is a French painter. Inspired by the Street Art movement of the 1980s (Urban Art), he focused on the digital arts and adapted his stencil technique with new technologies to create large format on canvas.

== Biography ==
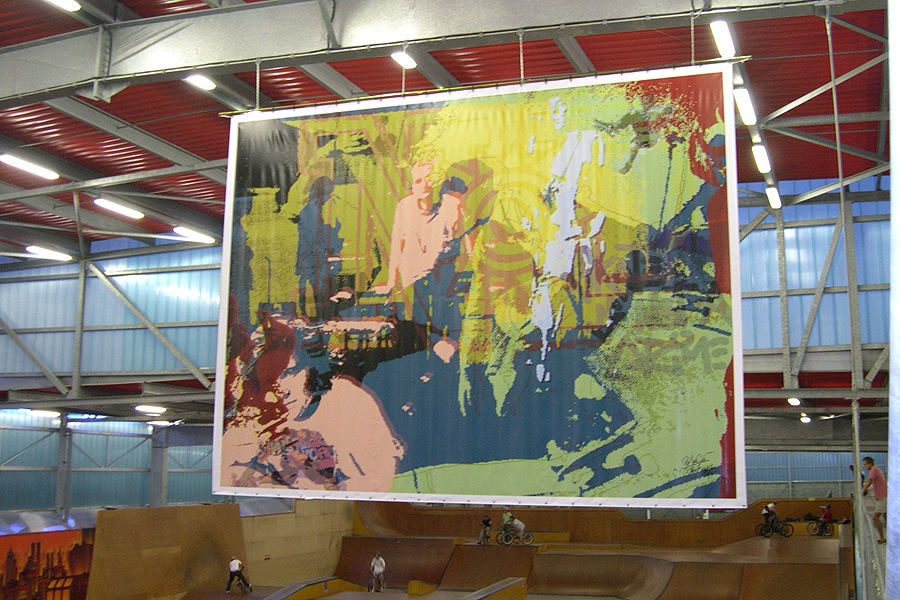
Phil.Macquet Halle de glisse - Lille

=== 1. Street Art ===
The first stencil of Phil. Macquet and his sidekick François Duquenne appeared in the streets of Lille in 1984. The duo became known under the pseudonym Dr. Table and were noticed by Christoph Maisenbacher, the agent of many European street artists. In 1991, their first stencil artwork was ordered by the museum of Charleville-Mézières to commemorate the 100th anniversary of the death of French poet Rimbaud's.

=== 2. Studies ===
In parallel to his (night) life as a stencil artist, Phil. Macquet began studying at the faculty of Fine Arts of Lille, and then at the Sorbonne in Paris where he mastered in Art and Image technology. During this time he continued his researches at the ENS of Cachan.

=== 3. From spray to pixel ===
In the 90s, the development of digital permitted to Phil. Macquet to extend his artwork to a new stencil dimension. He abandons the spray and chose the pixel as his raw material.

=== 4. From Canvas to augmented painting ===
It was during the 2000s, that the advent of mobile technology allows the artist to materialize his researches to exceed the limits of his artwork support and develop augmented painting. He experienced his art pieces in a new, animated way through creative applications.

== Works ==
=== 1. Pixelize me ===
From the street to the studio, Phil. Macquet creates digital compositions devoted to keeping their urban style be it in the artwork media (large tarps), in the choice of the subject (Rock music, skateboard, underground lifestyle, social utopia...), and in the pictorial references (simplicity of shapes, intensity of colors and use of attractive, powerful and symbolic images).

=== 2. Collections and public orders ===
Phil. Macquet is known for his portrait artworks (Diane von Fürstenberg or Paul Smith) and his big size canvas in the heart of the city (Skate, 30 m^{2}, 2007, Lille's sliding hall within the context of « One Two ! One Two Exhibition »).

=== 3. Street Digital ===
The « Street Digital » term was born during the exhibition of Phil. Macquet work at Miami international Art Basel art fair in 2013 in which he mixed and blended canvas, stencil and digital apps to interact and form a mix between urban art and augmented reality.
