= Romeo Mancini =

Italian artist (1917–2003)

Romeo Mancini in his studio in Perugia during 1950s

Romeo Mancini (Perugia, 28 May 1917 – 19 March 2003) was an Italian painter and sculptor.

== Early life ==
Before the outbreak of the Second World War, Mancini attended the Accademia di Belle Arti di Perugia, where he met future artist Leoncillo Leonardi, who later wrote: "We talked down our professors passionately… and our friendship dates back to that. The years have passed… (and) Mancini has continued to fight against a narrow figurative culture, to criticise and to seek"...

During the early 1930s Mancini appeared to be seeking examples to follow in the nearby Scuola Romana.

Leonardi and Mancini both had an aversion to fascism and both later joined the partisans: Leonardi in Rome, and Mancini in Umbria, in the Colfiorito mountains, where he joined the Innamorati Brigade with Enzo Rossi. When the war ended, Mancini returned to Perugia.

The early works of Giuseppe Capogrossi and Mario Mafai appear to have been his points of reference for the Autoritratto (lit. Self-portrait) dated 1943, followed by Paul Cézanne in such works as the Gilet Rosso (lit. The Red Waistcoat).

In 1948, his sketch presented as part of the competition organized by the Sagra Musicale Umbra, along with three other contenders, was chosen as the official poster for the music festival that year. In the same period, Mancini obtained a notable commission: a fresco to be painted using the technique of the ancient masters, “on fresh plaster, using first a cartoon and then pouncing”, in Luisa Spagnoli's former headquarters.

After that, he travelled to Paris. Mancini left Perugia taking with him some photos of his recent works. While in France he immediately came into contact. with Édouard Pignon, heir to the tradition of Cézanne and Picasso.

== Villa Massimo ==
When he came back to Italy, Mancini decided to leave Perugia that not only Leoncillo, Rossi and Brunori, had also done. He chose to follow his group of friends and colleagues to Villa Massimo in Rome. Here, from 1948, a small group of left-wing Italian painters and sculptors had settled and arranged their own home-atelier in the building that had hosted the German Academy in Rome before the war.

Mancini had his first exhibition in Rome at Lo Zodiaco Gallery in 1950. He exhibited about twenty paintings at Lo Zodiaco.

The exhibition also included the Minatore (lit. The Miner), that the following year the painter also sent to the “Premi per la Pace” (lit. Peace Prize) contest organized by the “Rinascita” and “Vie Nuove” magazines. The panel was composed of the communist editors of the magazines that promoted the event, Palmiro Togliatti and Luigi Longo, and Pietro Nenni, the President of the National Liberation Committee representing the partisans, and technicians, Giulio Carlo Argan, Ranuccio Bianchi Bandinelli, Roberto Longhi, Libero De Libero, and Mario Penelope.

The jury appreciated Mancini's work, but were opposed by Togliatti, who was known to caution artists against supporting neo-cubist ideas from the pages of “Rinascita”.

In 1950 the Italian Communist Party invited a group of ten young left-wing artists to the Comacchio valleys, which at the time was one of the most deprived areas in the country. Romeo participated, together with Treccani, Turcato, Scarpitta, and the Neapolitan artist Ricci. The resulting works were exhibited during the Sagra della Fioritura Festival in Vignola, where a jury which included Mazzacurati awarded Mancini with the third prize, consisting of a wheel of Grana Padano cheese. Back in his atelier in Villa Massimo, Romeo re-elaborated the sketches made in Comacchio, and transformed them into large oil compositions. Of this group of works, the artist kept two temperas, Pescatori in riposo (lit. Fishermen at Rest) and Gioco della morra (lit. Game of Morra). These two fishermen are the predecessors of the two robots placed side by side that the artist calls Cattedrali (lit. Cathedrals).

The 1950s were the central years of Romeo's activity, including abroad. In 1953 he participated in the International Youth Festival in Warsaw with his work the Fiocinatore (lit. Harpooner) which earned him the second prize.

In 1951 Minatori was the painting chosen by Mancini to participate in the VI Rome Quadriennale .

In November 1956 Romeo was invited at the XXVIII edition of the Venice Biennale.

Here Mancini was presented with two ceramic high reliefs: Fiocinatori (lit. Harpooners) n. 2 and Fiocinatori n. 3, both created in 1956 and exhibited in Venice in a pavilion designed by Carlo Scarpa.

In 1956, partially as a result of a smear campaign led by the German press against the artists of Villa Massimo, along with their way of life, the government of that country was able to evict the Italians and reorganize the academy within the villa. Mancini was already no longer living there permanently, due to the many commissions he received in Umbria.

== The Fishermen ==
Mancini married in 1956 with Franca Ottalevi and moved back to Perugia.

In 1957, Mancini became professor of sculpture at the local Academy of Fine Arts, a position he would hold for more than twenty years. In 1973 Professor Mancini was also appointed director, which saw him undertake the revision of the nineteenth century statute of the Perugia Academy, creating new courses and reorganizing, with the help of the conservator Pietro Scarpellini, the drawings and prints still preserved at the Pietro Vannucci Academy.

Returning then to Perugia in the mid 1950s, Mancini again began to frequent the studio in Via Baldeschi that he had shared with his brother the conservator, before his time in Rome. He remained there preparing the sketches for the monuments to those who died in the war, and also returned to his paintings of fishermen, some Cubist, some realistic.

Mancini, however, did not break off all contacts with Rome, organizing regular exhibitions in the capital. In the spring of 1958 he organized a personal exhibition at the Galleria La Salita. In Umbria, where Mancini now resided, in 1959 he participated, resulting in significant recognition, in the first edition of the "Premio Perugia" (lit. Perugia Prize).

In 1961 Romeo presented himself to the public in Perugia with twenty-seven recent paintings, exhibited between March and April in the Palazzo dei Priori.

In 1963 Romero organized personal exhibitions in several U.S. states (Michigan, Indiana, Ohio).

Mancini supervised the scenery for The Firebird by Stravinsky at the Teatro Morlacchi in Perugia. The artist found inspiration for this work in the painting Antibes from the 1950s.

In 1966 Romeo was also invited to exhibit at the IX Quadriennale, where he presented two works on his usual theme of fishermen, called Tempi del lavoratore del mare (lit. Temples of the Workers of the Sea) and II.

== Monuments ==
Many monuments were commissioned to Mancini in the late 1940s and early 1950s by the municipalities of Umbria.

The municipality of Pietralunga commissioned a plastic and dense bronze monument with figures to commemorate their dead (1948). Here the artist seems to have been heavily influenced by Mazzacurati, following the outline already established in 1942 with la Strage degli innocenti (lit. the Slaughter of the Innocents), which he would continue to repeat during the same period.

A reminder of Cubism emerges again in the large Monumento ai Caduti di tutte le guerre (lit. Monument to the Fallen of All Wars)1956, in Passignano, Perugia, which consists of a colourful ceramic frieze, mounted in a grey stone frame.

The study and construction of this monument took Mancini at least two years of work. A group of studies for the various component parts was presented at the Brufani exhibition in Perugia of 1953.

Castiglione del Lago also wanted a monument to their dead, and Romeo created a large composition in bronze bas-relief in which, on a barely sketched background of the city, there stands a turreted figure of Italy, that observes the scene of a mother bent over the body of her son, who has died for his country. The sculpture, cast in Verona, was inaugurated with a solemn ceremony in November 1956, by which time Romeo was already officially and internationally recognized as a sculptor, presenting himself as such at the XXVIII edition of the Venice Biennale.

In 1958 he realized the monument to the Partisan of Montebuono, Agello, Perugia.

In 1961, when he was asked to create a visualization of Perugia for the great exhibition in Turin, “Italia '61”. The work modelled in ceramic with an operation of synthesis and abstraction, recalls, thanks to the precious material, the golden glow of ancient sun baked Etruscan stones and, through synthetic and sharp forms, suggests the idea of the urban development of the medieval city. The sculpture was prepared by Mancini for the stand designed by the architects representing Umbria, Astengo, Zanetti and Campus, at the great Turin exhibition.

In 1962 he realized the sculpture Dedicata al lavoratore (lit. Dedicated to the Worker), executed for the fountain in Piazza d'Anni at S. Giuliana in Perugia.

In 1967 he created the great Scultura in acciaio (lit. Steel Sculpture) for Città della Pieve and the Aerei (lit. Aircraft), also in steel, to commemorate the dead in Passignano, on lake Trasimeno.

In the same year, the sculpture Icone 67 was sent to Alexandria in Egypt. The Venice Biennale had organized an exhibition of twelve artists in the city, and Mancini, on the recommendation of Valentino Martinelli, was invited to exhibit two sculptures and two paintings. At this time, the artist designed abstract works, clearly destined to live in the open air, in the interplay of natural light and his figures of fishermen or workers.

In 1984 Mancini produced works such as the sculpture in memory of Capitini one dedicated to the Fanciullo (lit. Young Man), and another dedicated to the (Ai Democratici Umbri Vittime dello squadrismo fascista 1921-1922 (lit. Victims of the fascist squads), all in Perugia.

== The Cathedrals ==
In 1968, Mancini created the first prototypes of the Cattedrali per la conquista dello spazio (lit. Cathedrals for the Conquest of Space) that predated his entire output from that point onward date back to this time.

The use of metallic materials, visits to foundries, the idea that the world is now irrevocably reduced to a giant Meccano set, led Mancini to create a series of large paintings testing himself with a material that was new to him: acrylic. The smooth, cold surface created by this paint composes and decomposes itself, creating a split, sections of mysterious mechanical objects.

Mancini built new bodies mounted with machine parts that he called Cattedrali (lit. Cathedrals), but these pieces of machinery, these Cattedrali in the end always recalled the shape of the human body, or rather of two opposing human bodies. Cattedrali “in the desert, factories, as places where they concentrate all social value, collectives of positivity and human duration”.

1972 saw a major retrospective at the town hall in Perugia, which featured, as well as older works, a series of more recent sculptures. In 1976, again at the Palazzo dei Priori municipal building in Perugia, Mancini presented the great Cattedrali in acrylic to the public. This series culminated in 1984 with an exhibition at the Rocca Paolina in Perugia.

== Artworks in Museums, Public and Private institutions ==
National Gallery of Umbria, Perugia, Sculpture dedicated to Aldo Capitini, 1982

Rome, House of Representative, Montecitorio Palace, Two fishermen with lights (Due pescatori con lampare) oil on canvas, 1964

Spain, Flix, Monument to the International Brigades, 1990, iron,

Slovak National Gallery, Bratislava, Fishermen, oil on canvas 1965,

Columbus Museum of Art, Columbus Ohio, Two fishermen, ink and tempera on paper, 1964,

Gallery of Modern and Contemporary Art, Republic of San Marino, Night fishing, oil on canvas, 1956

Gallery of Modern and Contemporary Art, Republic of San Marino, Composizione without title, acrylic on canvas, 1976

Office of the Umbria Region, Perugia, Night Fisherman, oil on canvas, during '60s

Office of Province of Perugia, Apocalypse, oil on canvas 1964

Museum of Modern Art of Perugia, Palazzo della Penna, Oxen, oil on canvas 1952

Collections of the Townhall of Perugia, Il Picconiere, oil on canvas, 1950

National Museum, Collezione Salce Complesso di San Gaetano, Treviso, Manifesto della Sagra Musicale Umbra, 1948,

Museum of Ceramic, Deruta (Perugia), sculpture in ceramic, 1963 and a plastic relief representing Perugia for "Italia '61 a Torino", 1961, ceramic.

Fondation of Contemporary Ceramic Alviero Moretti, Deruta, Perugia, ceramics

National Gallery of Umbria, Perugia, Composition of figures (without title), oil on plywood, between 1950 and 1960

Rocca Paolina, Perugia, Monument dedicated to the Victims of the fascist squad (Ai Democratici Umbri Vittime dello squadrismo fascista 1921-1922), 1984, bronze

Area of Santa Giuliana, Perugia, Fountain dedicated to the worker, 1962

Perugia, Via Cortonese (before it was in Piazza Partigiani), Sculpture dedicated to childhood, 1980, steel

Pietralunga, Perugia, Monument to the fallen, 1948, travertino stone e bronze

Passignano, Perugia, Monument to the fallen of all wars, 1955–56, stone and polychrome ceramic

Castiglione del lago, Perugia, Monumento to the fallen of all wars, 1956, bronze and stone

Montebuono, Perugia, Monument to the Partisan, 1958, stone

Agello, Perugia, Monumento ai Caduti Partigiani di Agello, 1958, steel

Passignano sul Trasimeno, Perugia, Sculpture Institute Dalmazio Birago, 1964-66 c.

Bova Marina (Reggio Calabria), metal sculpture, 1965

Città della Pieve, Perugia, steel sculpture, 1967, destroyed.

Passignano sul Trasimeno, Perugia, Monument to the Aviators fallen in the Trasimeno lake, 1967, steel

Pozzuolo, Perugia, School Gino Galeotti, (Cathedrals), Cattedrali per la conquista dello spazio 1968, ceramic

Umbertide, Perugia, steel sculpture, 1970, acciaio.

Mugnano, Perugia, Monument to the work, 1986, bronze

Mugnano, Perugia, Elementi nell'artigianato, 1987

Castiglione del Lago, Perugia, Monument to Life, 1989, bronze

Foligno, Palio per la Giostra della Quintana, cm 200 x 104, 1990

Rome, Collection CGIL, Minatori del Bastardo, (Miners) 1950, oil on canvas, cm 100 x 70

Rome, Collection CGIL, Fisherman, (without title) 1951, oil on masonite, cm 70,4 x 50

Perugia, Unicredit Bank, Onda Rossa (Red wave) 1974, oil on canvas, cm 149 x 129

Perugia, Corso Vannucci, ex Olivetti office, painting on wall not visible since it has been covered, Operaie, 1950

Perugia, Società del Mutuo Soccorso fra gli artisti e gli operai di Perugia, in Corso Garibaldi, Bas-relief dedicated to Guglielmo Miliocchi, 1987

Perugia, Manifesto per UmbriaJazz, 1990
