= Sekou Ouattara (football) =

Ivorian footballer

Personal information
- Full name: Alassane Dramane Sekou Ouattara
- Date of birth: March 19, 1986 (age 40)
- Place of birth: Abidjan, Côte d'Ivoire
- Height: 1.81 m (5 ft 11 in)
- Position: Defender

Team information
- Current team: KSV Roeselare

Youth career
- JMG Academy Abidjan

Senior career*
Years	Team	Apps	(Gls)
2004–2008	KSK Beveren	32	(0)
2008	Le Mans Union Club 72		
2008–2009	KSV Roeselare	21	(2)
2009–	Le Mans Union Club 72		
- * Club domestic league appearances and goals

Sekou Ouattara (born 19 March 1986) is an Ivorian football player who currently plays for Le Mans Union Club 72 in France.

== Career ==
Ouattara played for JMG Academy Abidjan in his youth.
