= Danny Sillada =

Filipino artist, writer and musician (born 1963)

Danny Castillo Sillada
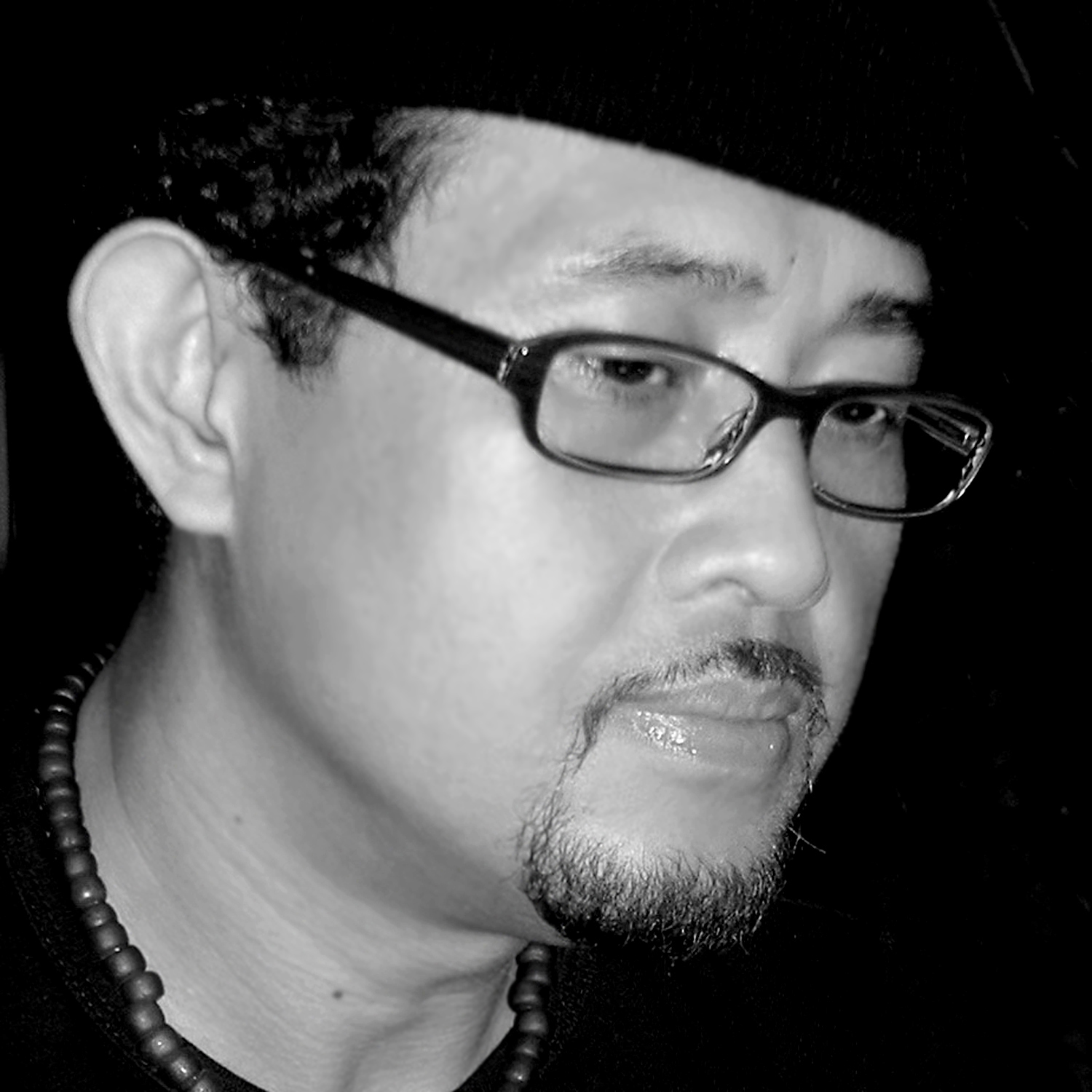
- Danny C. Sillada in 2007
- Born: Danillo Castillones Sillada; 27 April 1963 (age 63); Cateel, Davao, Philippines
- Education: Ateneo de Manila University, University of Santo Tomas, Queen of Apostles College Seminary, San Carlos Seminary, Philippines
- Known for: Painting, installation art, performance art, literature, philosophy, music, critical theory
- Notable work: “Menstrual Period in Political History”(2005)
- Movement: Surrealism, Existentialism

Danny C. Sillada (born April 27, 1963) is a Filipino artist, writer and cultural critic from Mindanao.

== Biography ==
Sillada has contributed to various art forms, from painting, to music and performance art. He was a recipient of 2003 "Pasidungog Centennial Awards" for literary and visual arts, a centennial event that was attended by the president of the Philippines Gloria Macapagal Arroyo in his hometown province in Davao Oriental.

In 2005, Sillada was controversial for his artwork titled Menstrual Period in Political History, “a satirical take on the recurring political crisis in the Philippines. This controversial mixed media piece (an attempt was made to destroy it at the height of the “Hello Garci” political scandal) reflects the artist's critical stance toward the power struggles that “are putting our country into pit.””

As a multi-talented artist, Sillada also writes and publishes poetry and philosophical essays both on print and on-line, composes and performs ethnic songs, hip-hop and ethno-techno music at the local Metro Manila alternative venues. He was described in a research paper submitted to the University of Asia and the Pacific as “the embodiment of a Filipino who defies the existing trend. His multi-faceted attribute in the humanities, as a Renaissance man, is identical with those of well-rounded historical figures during the Renaissance period in Europe. Sillada is a visual artist recognized in the Philippine art scene for his paintings and installation artworks, a literary writer who is into prose and poetry, a philosopher, whose writings are akin with existentialism, a first-rate performance artist, and also an art-critic." An excerpt of the research paper on Danny Sillada submitted to the University of Asia and the Pacific by Michael Marlowe Uy and Katrina Kalaw is available online.

He studied priesthood (Roman Catholic) at the Pontifical and Royal University of Santo Tomas and San Carlos Seminary, Philippines, but left his vocation six months before his ordination to the Sacrament of Holy Orders to become a full-time artist.

Sillada obtained his BA Philosophy and Literature at the Queen of Apostles College Seminary, Davao (1986); his graduate and post graduate studies in Bachelor in Sacred Theology (1990) and Pastoral Theology (1991) at the University of Santo Tomas, Manila, and his MBA (units) at the Ateneo de Manila University (1993), Philippines.
