= Randy Halasan =

Filipino teacher

- Born: July 29, 1982 (age 44); Davao City
- Education: Pablo Lorenzo National High School, University of SouthEastern Philippines
- Occupation: Teacher
- Awards: Ramon Magsaysay Award

Randy Halasan is a Flilipino teacher who received the Ramon Magsaysay Award in 2014.

According to the citation, Halasan received the award for nurturing his Matigsalug students and their community, respecting their uniqueness, and preserving their integrity as indigenous peoples in a modernizing Philippines.
