= Romeo (surname) =

Romeo is an Italian origin surname. Romero is the Spanish equivalent. It may refer to:

- Antonia Romeo (born 1974), British civil servant
- Bernardo Romeo (born 1977), Argentine football player
- Massimiliano Romeo (born 1971), Italian politician
- Max Romeo (1944–2025), Jamaican reggae and roots reggae recording musician
- Michael Romeo (born 1968), lead guitarist of Symphony X
- Nicola Romeo (1876–1938), Italian engineer and entrepreneur who owned Alfa Romeo in its early years
- Paolo Romeo (born 1938), Cardinal Archbishop of Palermo, Italy
- Sebastiano Romeo (1931–1998), leader of the 'Ndrangheta Italian criminal organization
- Terrence Romeo (born 1992), Filipino basketball player
- Tony Romeo (1939–1995), American songwriter
- Tony Romeo (American football) (1938–1996), American college and American Football League player
- Valentina Romeo (born 1977), Italian cartoonist, illustrator, billiards player
