= Laurent Macquet =

French footballer (born 1979)

Personal information
- Full name: Laurent Michel Macquet
- Date of birth: August 11, 1979 (age 47)
- Place of birth: Marcq-en-Barœul, France
- Height: 1.78 m (5 ft 10 in)
- Position: Midfielder

Youth career
- 1985–1988: Lille OSC
- 1988–1994: Tourcoing FC
- 1994–1999: AS Cannes

Senior career*
Years	Team	Apps	(Gls)
1999–2002	AS Cannes	92	(5)
2002–2005	R. Charleroi S.C.	73	(6)
2005–2006	Akratitos F.C.	25	(0)
2006–2007	K.S.K. Beveren	34	(0)
2007–2009	Grenoble Foot 38	27	(0)
2010–2011	Vannes OC	41	(2)
2011–2013	Fréjus Saint-Raphaël	13	(2)
- * Club domestic league appearances and goals as of December 31, 2006

Laurent Michel Macquet (born August 11, 1979) is a French football midfielder.
