= Romeo Montenegro =

Romeo Mencidor Montenegro (February 8, 1974) devoted most of his career in pursuing sustainable peace and economic development in the island-region of Mindanao in Southern Philippines. He is currently serving as Director for Investment Promotion and Public Affairs Office of the Mindanao Development Authority (MinDA), a government body with principal mandate to integrate the socioeconomic development of Mindanao and serves as the Philippine Coordinating Office for the Brunei Darussalam-Indonesia-Malaysia-the Philippines-East ASEAN Growth Area BIMP-EAGA. He is married to Venus Alcomendras, with whom he has a son named Juan Carlos.

== Government Service ==
As MinDA's Director for Investment Promotion and Public Affairs, his broad roles include overseeing implementation of MinDA programs and activities to boost Mindanao's viability as an investment destination through trade facilitation and promotion, as well as initiatives to strengthen its participation in the BIMP-EAGA sub-regional cooperation. He also performs as the official MinDA spokesperson, being the overall head of media of public affairs.

Previously, he served as Chief of Staff and Head of Media Relations at the Office of the Press Secretary, where he also acted as alternate deputy spokesperson during Presidential foreign visits. Prior to that he also served as Director for Media and Public Affairs and spokesperson of the Office of the Presidential Adviser on the Peace Process (OPAPP) between 2007 and 2008.

Over the last 22 years of media and public relations work in the government and development agencies, he has written and produced a significant number of press materials; appeared in several national television and radio guestings; and, has conducted workshops on public relations, as well as peace and development reporting. He also currently serves as Secretary-General of the Mindanao Communicators Network and co-convenor of the four-country BIMP-EAGA Media and Communicators Association. His dedicated government career has spanned across five administrations—from Ramos to Duterte, and has illustrated a feat of rising from the ranks in various executive offices attached to the Office of the President of the Philippines.

== Development Work ==
From March 1999 to January 2001, Montenegro forayed in development work and was assigned as the Senior Information Officer of the Communication Team of USAID's Growth with Equity in Mindanao (GEM) Program, a bilateral project of the US Agency for International Development (USAID) and the then Office of the President of the Philippines (OP Mindanao).

The GEM Communication Team received the Award of Merit for Excellence in Multi-Audience Communication from the Washington D.C.–based International Association of Business Communicators (IABC Gold Quill Awards for 1999) for its implementation of the GEM communications program.

== Educational Background ==
He holds a master's degree in Public Administration at the Ateneo de Davao University. He completed a short course on Peace Journalism (Conflict Resolving Media) at the Center for Peace and Conflict Studies‐University of Sydney, Australia, under a scholarship grant from the Australian Agency for International Development. His competence as a government executive was further enhanced with recent international training on Trade Facilitation in ASEAN Economies; Low Emission Development Strategy; Economic Corridors Development in Asia; and Regional Power Market and Cross-Border Interconnection in ASEAN, held in Singapore, Thailand, and South Korea between 2014 and 2015. He also completed a short course on Agribusiness Executives' Program at the University of Asia and the Pacific (UA&P).

He obtained his bachelor's degree in Nursing at the Davao Doctors College and graduated as one of the Top 10 students in his class.
