= Roméo Affessi =

Ivorian footballer

Roméo Seka
Personal information
- Full name: Roméo Affessi Seka
- Date of birth: 19 February 1984 (age 42)
- Place of birth: Ivory Coast
- Height: 1.73 m (5 ft 8 in)
- Position: Attacking midfielder

Senior career*
Years	Team	Apps	(Gls)
–2003	ASEC Mimosas		
2003–2007	K.S.K. Beveren	80	(6)
2007–2008	RAEC Mons	6	(1)
- * Club domestic league appearances and goals as of 20 October 2006 ‡ National team caps and goals as of 20 October 2006

Roméo "Seka" Affessi (born 19 February 1984) is an Ivorian footballer who plays in the offensive midfield.

== Career ==
Seka previously played for RAEC Mons and K.S.K. Beveren in the Belgian First Division. He began his career with ASEC Mimosas.
