= 1989 FIFA World Youth Championship squads =

FIFA championship roster

== Group A ==
=== Czechoslovakia ===
Head coach: (Czechoslovakia) Václav Ježek

No.	Pos.	Player	Date of birth (age)	Caps	Club
1	GK	Tomáš Bernady	24 October 1969 (aged 19)		(Czechoslovakia) Baník Ostrava
2	DF	Michal Petrouš	6 December 1969 (aged 19)		(Czechoslovakia) Bohemians Praha
3	DF	Stanislav Vencel	28 September 1969 (aged 19)		(Czechoslovakia) Slovan Bratislava
4	DF	Daniel Šmejkal	28 August 1970 (aged 18)		(Czechoslovakia) Škoda Plzeň
5	DF	Jiří Novotný	7 April 1970 (aged 18)		(Czechoslovakia) Sparta Praha
6	MF	Jozef Majoroš	19 March 1970 (aged 18)		(Czechoslovakia) Dukla Banská Bystrica
7	FW	Radoslav Látal	6 January 1970 (aged 19)		(Czechoslovakia) Sigma Olomouc
8	MF	Martin Kotůlek	11 September 1969 (aged 19)		(Czechoslovakia) Sigma Olomouc
9	FW	Jiří Novák	26 October 1969 (aged 19)		(Czechoslovakia) Slavia Praha
10	MF	Radim Nečas	26 August 1969 (aged 19)		(Czechoslovakia) Baník Ostrava
11	FW	Marián Bochnovič	3 March 1970 (aged 18)		(Czechoslovakia) Plastika Nitra
12	MF	Milan Malatinský	8 February 1970 (aged 19)		(Czechoslovakia) Spartak Trnava
13	FW	Martin Procházka	15 August 1969 (aged 19)		(Czechoslovakia) Slavia Praha
14	MF	Martin Obšitník	2 November 1969 (aged 19)		(Czechoslovakia) Inter Bratislava
15	MF	Peter Ryzek	12 September 1969 (aged 19)		(Czechoslovakia) Slovan Bratislava
16	MF	Miloš Lonc	22 September 1969 (aged 19)		(Czechoslovakia) ZVL Žilina
17	MF	Radek Basta	3 March 1971 (aged 17)		(Czechoslovakia) Baník Ostrava
18	GK	Norbert Juračka	3 January 1970 (aged 19)		(Czechoslovakia) Dukla Banská Bystrica

=== Nigeria ===
Head coach: (Nigeria) Olatunde Disu

No.	Pos.	Player	Date of birth (age)	Caps	Club
1	GK	Angus Ikeji	10 December 1970 (aged 18)		(Nigeria) Iwuanyanwu Nationale
2	FW	Jimoh Balogun	17 December 1970 (aged 18)		(Nigeria) Julius Berger
3	DF	Nduka Ugbade	6 September 1969 (aged 19)		(Nigeria) El-Kanemi Warriors
4	MF	Christopher Ohenhen	14 October 1970 (aged 18)		(Nigeria) Calabar Rovers
5	DF	Samuel Elijah	14 November 1969 (aged 19)		(Nigeria) Shooting Stars
6	MF	Taiwo Enegwea	29 June 1972 (aged 16)		(Nigeria) Eagle Oil
7	DF	Oladunni Oyekale	9 December 1972 (aged 16)		(Nigeria) Highlanders
8	MF	Mutiu Adepoju	22 December 1970 (aged 18)		(Nigeria) Shooting Stars
9	MF	Peter Ogaba	24 September 1974 (aged 14)		(Nigeria) BCC Lions
10	MF	Mohammed Oladimeji	24 July 1971 (aged 17)		(Nigeria) Julius Berger
11	MF	Anthony Emoedofu	1 December 1972 (aged 16)		(Nigeria) Julius Berger
12	DF	Odiari Chinedu	23 December 1969 (aged 19)		(Nigeria) Eagle Oil
13	DF	Tunde Charity	18 November 1970 (aged 18)		(Nigeria) Bendel Insurance
14	FW	Christopher Nwosu	6 October 1971 (aged 17)		(Nigeria) First Bank
15	DF	Michael Onyemachara	13 January 1970 (aged 19)		(Nigeria) First Bank
16	DF	Bawa Abdullahi	20 April 1972 (aged 16)		(Nigeria) Eagle Oil
17	FW	Philip Osundo	28 November 1971 (aged 17)		(Belgium) Anderlecht
18	GK	Emeka Amadi	26 August 1972 (aged 16)		(Nigeria) Enugu Rangers

=== Portugal ===
Head coach: (Portugal) Carlos Queiroz

No.	Pos.	Player	Date of birth (age)	Caps	Goals	Club
1	GK	Fernando Brassard	11 April 1972 (aged 16)	0	0	(Portuguese Football Federation) Benfica
2	DF	Abel Silva	21 August 1969 (aged 19)	0	0	(Portuguese Football Federation) Benfica
3	FW	Paulo Alves	10 December 1969 (aged 19)	0	0	(Portuguese Football Federation) Gil Vicente
4	MF	Paulo Sousa	30 August 1970 (aged 18)	0	0	(Portuguese Football Federation) Benfica
5	DF	Mário Morgado	31 December 1969 (aged 19)	0	0	(Portuguese Football Federation) Gil Vicente
6	FW	Jorge Couto	1 July 1970 (aged 18)	0	0	(Portuguese Football Federation) Gil Vicente
7	MF	Tózé	6 September 1969 (aged 19)	0	0	(Portuguese Football Federation) Leixões
8	MF	Hélio Sousa	12 August 1969 (aged 19)	0	0	(Portuguese Football Federation) Vitória de Setúbal
9	FW	Xavier	15 August 1970 (aged 18)	0	0	(Portuguese Football Federation) Estoril-Praia
10	DF	Paulo Madeira	6 September 1970 (aged 18)	0	0	(Portuguese Football Federation) Benfica
11	MF	Filipe Ramos	21 April 1970 (aged 18)	0	0	(Portuguese Football Federation) Torreense
12	GK	José Bizarro	11 January 1970 (aged 19)	0	0	(Portuguese Football Federation) Benfica
13	MF	António Resende	6 November 1969 (aged 19)	0	0	(Portuguese Football Federation) Farense
14	FW	João Pinto	19 August 1971 (aged 17)	0	0	(Portuguese Football Federation) Boavista
15	DF	Valido	13 March 1970 (aged 18)	0	0	(Portuguese Football Federation) Estoril-Praia
16	DF	Fernando Couto	2 August 1969 (aged 19)	0	0	(Portuguese Football Federation) Famalicão
17	FW	António Folha	21 May 1971 (aged 17)	0	0	(Portuguese Football Federation) Porto
18	FW	Amaral	1 June 1970 (aged 18)	0	0	(Portuguese Football Federation) Académica de Coimbra

=== Saudi Arabia ===
Head coach: (Brazil) José Roberto Avila

No.	Pos.	Player	Date of birth (age)	Caps	Club
1	GK	Saud Al-Otaibi	3 November 1969 (aged 19)		(Saudi Arabia) Al-Shabab
2	DF	Musaed Al-Terair	31 August 1970 (aged 18)		(Saudi Arabia) Al-Nasr
3	MF	Abdullah Al-Dosari	23 November 1970 (aged 18)		(Saudi Arabia) Al-Qadisiyyah
4	DF	Abdulrahman Al-Roomi	28 October 1969 (aged 19)		(Saudi Arabia) Al-Shabab
5	DF	Ahmad Jamil Madani	6 January 1970 (aged 19)		(Saudi Arabia) Al-Ittihad
6	MF	Waleed Al-Medawah	21 May 1970 (aged 18)		(Saudi Arabia) Al-Hilal
7	FW	Jabar Al-Shamrani	29 November 1972 (aged 16)		(Saudi Arabia) Al-Ittihad
8	MF	Fuad Anwar	13 October 1972 (aged 16)		(Saudi Arabia) Al-Shabab
9	FW	Saadoun Al-Suraiti	14 July 1970 (aged 18)		(Saudi Arabia) Al-Ettifaq
10	MF	Khaled Al-Dosari	6 August 1970 (aged 18)		(Saudi Arabia) Al-Qadisiyyah
11	FW	Fahad Al-Mehalel	11 November 1970 (aged 18)		(Saudi Arabia) Al-Shabab
12	DF	Khaled Al-Harbi	11 October 1969 (aged 19)		(Saudi Arabia) Al-Ahli
13	FW	Hamad Al-Debaiki	4 February 1970 (aged 19)		(Saudi Arabia) Al-Ettifaq
14	MF	Saud Al-Hammali	19 October 1972 (aged 16)		(Saudi Arabia) Al-Nasr
15	DF	Mansour Al-Muwain	24 October 1970 (aged 18)		(Saudi Arabia) Al-Hilal
16	MF	Khaled Al-Hazaa	2 December 1971 (aged 17)		(Saudi Arabia) Al-Nasr
17	FW	Khalid Al Rowaihi	15 December 1971 (aged 17)		(Saudi Arabia) Al-Ahli
18	GK	Hassan Adam	5 August 1970 (aged 18)		(Saudi Arabia) Al-Ittihad

== Group B ==
=== Colombia ===
Head coach: (Colombia) Juan José Pelaez

No.	Pos.	Player	Date of birth (age)	Caps	Club
1	GK	Miguel Calero	14 April 1971 (aged 17)		(Colombia) Carlos Sarmiento
2	DF	Geovanis Cassiani	10 January 1970 (aged 19)		(Colombia) Atlético Nacional
3	DF	Robeiro Moreno	11 November 1969 (aged 19)		(Colombia) Arco Saragoza
4	DF	Jorge Bermúdez	18 June 1971 (aged 17)		(Colombia) Quindío
5	DF	Víctor Marulanda	3 February 1971 (aged 18)		(Colombia) Atlético Nacional
6	DF	Fabian Martínez	11 January 1970 (aged 19)		(Colombia) Liga de Bogotá
7	FW	Wilson Muñoz	4 August 1970 (aged 18)		(Colombia) Independiente Medellín
8	MF	Carlos Jiménez	26 December 1971 (aged 17)		(Colombia) Independiente Medellín
9	FW	Jairo Zulbarán	7 January 1970 (aged 19)		(Colombia) Unión Magdalena
10	MF	José Santa	12 September 1970 (aged 18)		(Colombia) Atlético Nacional
11	FW	Carlos Castro	17 August 1970 (aged 18)		(Colombia) Independiente Medellín
12	GK	Óscar Córdoba	3 February 1970 (aged 19)		(Colombia) Atlético Nacional
13	FW	Diego Osorio	21 July 1970 (aged 18)		(Colombia) Independiente Medellín
14	MF	José Torres	7 December 1970 (aged 18)		(Colombia) América de Cali
15	MF	Gustavo Restrepo	24 September 1969 (aged 19)		(Colombia) Atlético Nacional
16	FW	Iván Valenciano	18 March 1972 (aged 16)		(Colombia) Atlético Junior
17	DF	Martin Vélez	26 August 1970 (aged 18)		(Colombia) De León
18	MF	Ómar Cañas	16 September 1969 (aged 19)		(Colombia) América de Cali

=== Costa Rica ===
Head coach: (Costa Rica) Juan José Gámez

No.	Pos.	Player	Date of birth (age)	Caps	Club
1	GK	Paul Mayorga	21 September 1970 (aged 18)		(Costa Rica) Alajuelense
2	DF	Orlando Sibaja	9 October 1969 (aged 19)		(Costa Rica) Herediano
3	DF	Maximilian Peynado	8 September 1970 (aged 18)		(Costa Rica) Alajuelense
4	DF	Óscar Valverde	7 August 1969 (aged 19)		(Costa Rica) Alajuelense
5	DF	Rónald González	8 August 1970 (aged 18)		(Costa Rica) Uruguay
6	MF	Austín Berry	5 April 1971 (aged 17)		(Costa Rica) Alajuelense
7	MF	Eusebio Montero	12 January 1971 (aged 18)		(Costa Rica) Herediano
8	MF	Mauricio Vargas	21 October 1970 (aged 18)		(Costa Rica) Herediano
9	FW	Juan Carlos Arguedas	3 May 1970 (aged 18)		(Costa Rica) Alajuelense
10	MF	Brian Villalobos	21 September 1970 (aged 18)		(Costa Rica) Herediano
11	MF	Rónald Cháves	6 December 1970 (aged 18)		(Costa Rica) Puntarenas
12	FW	Danilo Brenes	28 December 1970 (aged 18)		(Costa Rica) Puntarenas
13	FW	Harold López	19 June 1970 (aged 18)		(Costa Rica) Alajuelense
14	MF	Rolando Velasquez	20 December 1970 (aged 18)		(Costa Rica) Puntarenas
15	MF	Germán Varela	19 April 1970 (aged 18)		(Costa Rica) Ramonense
16	MF	Juan Adrián Leandro	8 February 1970 (aged 19)		(Costa Rica) Cartaginés
17	FW	Alexander Viquez	8 August 1969 (aged 19)		(Costa Rica) Alajuelense
18	GK	José Porras	8 November 1970 (aged 18)		(Costa Rica) Herediano

=== Syria ===
Head coach: (Soviet Union) Bakhadir Ibrahimov

No.	Pos.	Player	Date of birth (age)	Caps	Club
1	GK	Abdul Douna	13 October 1971 (aged 17)		(Syria) Al-Wathba
2	DF	Adnan Sabouni	13 November 1971 (aged 17)		(Syria) Al-Ittihad
3	DF	Abdullah Saddikah	18 November 1971 (aged 17)		(Syria) Al-Majd
4	DF	Ali Cheikh Dib	7 May 1972 (aged 16)		(Syria) Al-Horriya
5	MF	Ammar Habib	25 October 1969 (aged 19)		(Syria) Teshrin
6	DF	Fares Shahin	20 December 1971 (aged 17)		(Syria) Al-Karamah
7	MF	Bassem Farekh	12 December 1971 (aged 17)		(Syria) Hutteen
8	MF	Hisham Khalaf	1 November 1969 (aged 19)		(Syria) Al-Futowa
9	FW	Munaf Ramadan	19 October 1972 (aged 16)		(Syria) Jableh
10	MF	Mohammad Afash	31 October 1971 (aged 17)		(Syria) Al-Ittihad
11	MF	Radwan Ajam	20 November 1971 (aged 17)		(Syria) Al-Karamah
12	MF	Ammar Zeineh	3 November 1971 (aged 17)		(Syria) Al-Karamah
13	FW	Abdul Latif Helou	8 September 1971 (aged 17)		(Syria) Al-Horriya
14	MF	Ammar Awad	10 October 1972 (aged 16)		(Syria) Hutteen
15	DF	Marwan Taher	8 August 1972 (aged 16)		(Syria) Al-Shorta
16	DF	Yasser Sibai	6 February 1972 (aged 17)		(Syria) Al-Ittihad
17	MF	Fawaz Mando	27 December 1971 (aged 17)		(Syria) Al-Karamah
18	GK	Mohamed Al-Abdullah	21 October 1970 (aged 18)		(Syria) Al-Ittihad

=== Soviet Union ===
Head coach: (Soviet Union) Boris Ignatyev

No.	Pos.	Player	Date of birth (age)	Caps	Club
1	GK	Gintaras Staučė	24 December 1969 (aged 19)		(Soviet Union) Spartak Moscow
2	DF	Oleg Benko	21 October 1969 (aged 19)		(Soviet Union) Karpaty Lvov
3	DF	Sergei Zayets	18 August 1969 (aged 19)		(Soviet Union) Dynamo Kiev
4	DF	Oleg Tabunov	18 September 1969 (aged 19)		(Soviet Union) CSKA Moscow
5	MF	Sergei Bezhenar	9 August 1970 (aged 18)		(Soviet Union) Dynamo Kiev
6	MF	Mirjalol Kasimov	17 September 1970 (aged 18)		(Soviet Union) Pakhtakor Tashkent
7	MF	Bakhva Tedeev	18 September 1969 (aged 19)		(Soviet Union) Dynamo Tbilisi
8	MF	Valeri Popovitch	18 May 1970 (aged 18)		(Soviet Union) CSKA Moscow
9	FW	Oleg Salenko	25 October 1969 (aged 19)		(Soviet Union) Zenit Leningrad
10	MF	Andrei Timoshenko	15 August 1971 (aged 17)		(Soviet Union) Dynamo Moscow
11	FW	Sergey Kiriakov	1 January 1970 (aged 19)		(Soviet Union) Dynamo Moscow
12	DF	Omari Tetradze	13 October 1969 (aged 19)		(Soviet Union) Dynamo Tbilisi
13	FW	Oleg Matveyev	18 August 1970 (aged 18)		(Soviet Union) Dynamo Kiev
14	FW	Arif Asadov	18 August 1970 (aged 18)		(Soviet Union) Neftchi Baku
15	DF	Yuri Nikiforov	16 September 1970 (aged 18)		(Soviet Union) Chernomorets Odessa
16	GK	Vladimir Pchelnikov	30 March 1970 (aged 18)		(Soviet Union) Spartak Moscow
17	DF	Yuri Moroz	8 August 1970 (aged 18)		(Soviet Union) Dynamo Kiev
18	DF	Viktor Onopko	14 October 1970 (aged 18)		(Soviet Union) Shakhtar Donetsk

== Group C ==
=== Brazil ===
Head coach: (Brazil) Renê Simões

No.	Pos.	Player	Date of birth (age)	Caps	Club
1	GK	Carlos Germano	14 August 1970 (aged 18)		(Brazil) Vasco da Gama
2	DF	Cássio	17 January 1970 (aged 19)		(Brazil) Vasco da Gama
3	DF	Sandro	16 December 1970 (aged 18)		(Brazil) Ponte Preta
4	DF	Leonardo	5 September 1969 (aged 19)		(Brazil) Flamengo
5	DF	Rogério	20 March 1971 (aged 17)		(Brazil) Flamengo
6	MF	Moacir	21 March 1970 (aged 18)		(Brazil) Atlético Mineiro
7	MF	Bismarck	17 September 1969 (aged 19)		(Brazil) Vasco da Gama
8	FW	Marcelo Henrique	1 November 1969 (aged 19)		(Brazil) Vitória
9	MF	Marcelinho	1 February 1971 (aged 18)		(Brazil) Flamengo
10	MF	Sérgio Gil	22 July 1970 (aged 18)		(Brazil) Corinthians
11	FW	Anderson	19 September 1970 (aged 18)		(Brazil) Vasco da Gama
12	GK	Marcelo	9 December 1970 (aged 18)		(Brazil) América
13	DF	Edson	22 October 1969 (aged 19)		(Brazil) América
14	DF	Ari Bozão	2 August 1969 (aged 19)		(Brazil) Corinthians
15	MF	de Souza	17 March 1970 (aged 18)		(Brazil) Vitória
16	MF	França	9 August 1969 (aged 19)		(Brazil) Vasco da Gama
17	MF	Gustavo	23 February 1972 (aged 16)		(Brazil) Cruzeiro
18	FW	Assis	10 January 1971 (aged 18)		(Brazil) Grêmio

=== East Germany ===
Head coach: (East Germany) Lothar Priebe

No.	Pos.	Player	Date of birth (age)	Caps	Club
1	GK	Frank Schulze	31 March 1970 (aged 18)		(East Germany) Dynamo Dresden
2	MF	Steffen Freund	19 January 1970 (aged 19)		(East Germany) Stahl Brandenburg
3	DF	Mario Kern	16 August 1969 (aged 19)		(East Germany) Dynamo Dresden
4	DF	Lars Hermel	28 September 1970 (aged 18)		(East Germany) FC Karl-Marx-Stadt
5	MF	Steffen Karl	3 February 1970 (aged 19)		(East Germany) HFC Chemie
6	DF	Thomas Grabow	7 September 1969 (aged 19)		(East Germany) Berliner FC Dynamo
7	MF	Stephan Prause	18 January 1970 (aged 19)		(East Germany) Vorwärts Berlin
8	MF	Torsten Raspe	1 August 1969 (aged 19)		(East Germany) HFC Chemie
9	FW	Jürgen Rische	30 October 1970 (aged 18)		(East Germany) Lokomotive Leipzig
10	FW	Uwe Jähnig	26 August 1969 (aged 19)		(East Germany) Dynamo Dresden
11	FW	Henri Fuchs	23 June 1970 (aged 18)		(East Germany) FC Hansa Rostock
12	DF	Thomas Strecker	7 April 1971 (aged 17)		(East Germany) Berliner FC Dynamo
13	MF	Thomas Rath	26 July 1970 (aged 18)		(East Germany) Vorwärts Berlin
14	MF	Olaf Schreiber	12 September 1969 (aged 19)		(East Germany) Sachsenring Zwickau
15	DF	Sandy Enge	3 June 1971 (aged 17)		(East Germany) 1. FC Magdeburg
16	GK	Thomas Weiß	17 August 1970 (aged 18)		(East Germany) HFC Chemie
17	MF	Sven Kmetsch	13 August 1970 (aged 18)		(East Germany) Dynamo Dresden
18	DF	Michael Weinrich	3 November 1969 (aged 19)		(East Germany) Union Berlin

=== Mali ===
Head coach: (Mali) Idrissa Touré

No.	Pos.	Player	Date of birth (age)	Caps	Club
1	GK	Diabate Bouba	19 December 1970 (aged 18)		(Mali) Djoliba AC
2	DF	Sangare Habib	26 September 1969 (aged 19)		(Mali) Stade Malien
3	DF	Sidibe Diadie	14 August 1969 (aged 19)		(Mali) Real Bamako
4	MF	Boubacar Barry	25 November 1970 (aged 18)		(Mali) Stade Malien
5	DF	Oumar Guindo	19 December 1969 (aged 19)		(Mali) Débo Club
6	DF	Mamadou Tollo	25 September 1970 (aged 18)		(Mali) Djoliba
7	FW	Sissoko Boubacar	26 October 1971 (aged 17)		(Mali) Débo de Mopti
8	MF	Ibrahima Sory	15 September 1970 (aged 18)		(Mali) Real Bamako
9	FW	Malick Tandjigora	22 November 1970 (aged 18)		(Mali) Real Bamako
10	MF	Diallo Alassane	7 September 1970 (aged 18)		(Mali) Stade Malien
11	FW	Kante N'Faly	26 December 1970 (aged 18)		(Mali) Djoliba
12	MF	Soumare Issa	15 December 1969 (aged 19)		(Mali) Cercle Olympique
13	DF	Sidibe Oumar	12 December 1970 (aged 18)		(Mali) Djoliba
14	MF	Amadou Bass	22 December 1969 (aged 19)		(Mali) Djoliba
15	DF	Coulibaly Soumaila	12 October 1970 (aged 18)		(Mali) Firhoun
16	MF	Youssouf Koite	25 December 1969 (aged 19)		(Mali) Cercle Olympique
17	MF	Mamadou Dissa	31 December 1969 (aged 19)		(Mali) USFAS
18	GK	Mamoudou Kane	24 December 1970 (aged 18)		(Mali) Commune II

=== United States ===
Head coach: (United States) Bob Gansler

No.	Pos.	Player	Date of birth (age)	Caps	Club
1	GK	Kasey Keller	29 November 1969 (aged 19)		(United States) Portland Timbers
2	DF	Cameron Rast	16 January 1970 (aged 19)		(United States) University of Santa Clara
3	DF	Oscar Draguicevich	19 August 1969 (aged 19)		(United States) Argentinos CA
4	DF	Mike Burns	14 September 1970 (aged 18)		(United States) Hartwick College
5	MF	Dario Brose	27 January 1970 (aged 19)		(United States) North Carolina State University
6	MF	Neil Covone	31 August 1970 (aged 18)		(United States) Wake Forest University
7	MF	Martin Munnelly	11 November 1969 (aged 19)		(United States) Columbia University
8	DF	Curt Onalfo	19 November 1969 (aged 19)		(United States) University of Virginia
9	FW	Ben Crawley	6 May 1971 (aged 17)		(United States) Austin Capitals
10	FW	Steve Snow	2 February 1970 (aged 19)		(United States) Indiana University
11	FW	Gerard Lagos	25 August 1969 (aged 19)		(United States) UW Milwaukee
12	DF	Troy Dayak	29 January 1971 (aged 18)		(United States) Livermore
13	FW	Adam Tinkham	30 November 1969 (aged 19)		(United States) North Carolina
14	MF	Chris Henderson	11 December 1970 (aged 18)		(United States) Seattle Storm
15	MF	Bryan Thompson	8 November 1969 (aged 19)		(United States) Southern Methodist University
16	DF	Tim Horton	20 February 1970 (aged 18)		(United States) Boston University
17	MF	Lyle Yorks	30 January 1970 (aged 19)		(United States) University of Virginia
18	GK	Markus Roy	3 September 1970 (aged 18)		(United States) Northern Illinois University

== Group D ==
=== Argentina ===
Head coach: (Argentina) Carlos Oscar Pachamé

No.	Pos.	Player	Date of birth (age)	Caps	Club
1	GK	Roberto Bonano	24 January 1970 (aged 19)		(Argentina) Rosario Central
2	DF	Manuel Santos Aguilar	12 September 1969 (aged 19)		(Argentina) San Lorenzo
3	DF	Fernando Batista	20 August 1970 (aged 18)		(Argentina) Argentinos Juniors
4	FW	Humberto Biazotti	10 February 1970 (aged 19)		(Argentina) Ferro Carril Oeste
5	DF	Alberto Boggio	14 August 1969 (aged 19)		(Argentina) Rosario Central
6	MF	Marcelo Carracedo	16 April 1970 (aged 18)		(Argentina) Atlanta
7	MF	José Gallego	29 September 1969 (aged 19)		(Argentina) Vélez Sársfield
8	DF	Fernando Gamboa	28 October 1970 (aged 18)		(Argentina) Newell's Old Boys
9	DF	Carlos Gastaldi	15 August 1970 (aged 18)		(Argentina) Rosario Central
10	MF	Gustavo Masat	5 January 1970 (aged 19)		(Argentina) Newell's Old Boys
11	FW	Antonio Mohamed	2 April 1970 (aged 18)		(Argentina) Huracán
12	GK	Hernan Cristante	16 September 1969 (aged 19)		(Argentina) Gimnasia (LP)
13	FW	Alejandro Ruidiaz	3 September 1969 (aged 19)		(Argentina) Independiente
14	MF	Dario Scotto	1 September 1969 (aged 19)		(Argentina) Platense
15	DF	Sergio Stachiotti	8 January 1970 (aged 19)		(Argentina) Newell's Old Boys
16	MF	Diego Simeone	28 April 1970 (aged 18)		(Argentina) Vélez Sársfield
17	FW	Martín Félix Ubaldi	11 November 1969 (aged 19)		(Argentina) Independiente
18	DF	Claudio Ubeda	17 September 1969 (aged 19)		(Argentina) Independiente

- Apart from the two goalkeepers who were assigned numbers 1 & 12, this squad was numbered in alphabetical order of player surname.

=== Iraq ===
Head coach: (Iraq) Anwar Jassam

No.	Pos.	Player	Date of birth (age)	Caps	Club
1	GK	Omar Ahmed Tawfiq	3 August 1970 (aged 18)		(Iraq) Al-Tayaran
2	GK	Emad Hashim	10 February 1969 (aged 20)		(Iraq) Al-Shorta
3	DF	Abbas Attiya	25 August 1969 (aged 19)		(Iraq) Al-Rasheed
4	DF	Sharar Haidar	15 August 1971 (aged 17)		(Iraq) Al-Rasheed
5	MF	Wali Kareem	23 December 1970 (aged 18)		(Iraq) Al-Tayaran
6	MF	Amir Khamees Assi	5 November 1971 (aged 17)		(Iraq) Al-Selaikh
7	DF	Salim Hussein	17 December 1969 (aged 19)		(Iraq) Al-Shabab
8	FW	Nazar Naif Faraj	20 October 1970 (aged 18)		(Iraq) Al-Selaikh
9	MF	Majeed AbdulRidha	20 August 1971 (aged 17)		(Iraq) Al-Shabab
10	FW	Laith Hussein	13 October 1970 (aged 18)		(Iraq) Al-Rasheed
11	MF	Riyadh Abdul-Abbas	14 August 1969 (aged 19)		(Iraq) Al-Rasheed
12	DF	Samir Kadhim	11 December 1969 (aged 19)		(Iraq) Al-Jaish
13	FW	Naeem Saddam	15 August 1969 (aged 19)		(Iraq) Al-Rasheed
14	DF	Radhi Shenaishil	11 August 1969 (aged 19)		(Iraq) Al-Zawraa
15	MF	Saad Abdul-Hameed	10 September 1971 (aged 17)		(Iraq) Al-Tayaran
16	DF	Hamza Hadi	20 November 1969 (aged 19)		(Iraq) Al-Tayaran
17	FW	Mohammed Abdul Hussein	23 September 1970 (aged 18)		(Iraq) Al-Jaish
18	GK	Mahmoud Jassim Abdulla	20 December 1970 (aged 18)		(Iraq) Al-Shabab

=== Norway ===
Head coach: (Norway) Svein Ivar Sigernes

No.	Pos.	Player	Date of birth (age)	Caps	Club
1	GK	Morten Svalstad	25 September 1969 (aged 19)		(Norway) HamKam
2	DF	Henning Berg	1 September 1969 (aged 19)		(Norway) Vålerenga
3	DF	Tore Pedersen	29 September 1969 (aged 19)		(Norway) Fredrikstad
4	DF	Roger Nilsen	8 August 1969 (aged 19)		(Norway) Tromsø
5	DF	Stig Inge Bjørnebye	11 December 1969 (aged 19)		(Norway) Kongsvinger
6	MF	Bjørn Johansen	7 September 1969 (aged 19)		(Norway) Tromsø
7	MF	Terje Olsen	22 December 1970 (aged 18)		(West Germany) Bayer Leverkusen
8	MF	Lars Bohinen	8 September 1969 (aged 19)		(Norway) Vålerenga
9	MF	Øyvind Mellemstrand	17 October 1969 (aged 19)		(Norway) Stord
10	FW	Claus Eftevaag	20 December 1969 (aged 19)		(Norway) Start
11	FW	Krister Isaksen	15 April 1970 (aged 18)		(Norway) Start
12	GK	Roar Hagen	9 August 1971 (aged 17)		(Norway) Fredrikstad
13	DF	Lars Grevskott	12 September 1969 (aged 19)		(Norway) Strindheim
14	DF	Kjetil Sigurdsen	19 February 1970 (aged 18)		(Norway) Bryne
15	MF	Øystein Drillestad	22 January 1970 (aged 19)		(Norway) Råde
16	MF	Øyvind Leonhardsen	17 August 1970 (aged 18)		(Norway) Molde
17	FW	Stein Arne Ingelstad	25 July 1970 (aged 18)		(Norway) HamKam
18	FW	Roar Strand	2 February 1970 (aged 19)		(Norway) Rosenberg

=== Spain ===
Head coach: (Spain) Chus Pereda

No.	Pos.	Player	Date of birth (age)	Caps	Club
1	GK	Santiago Cañizares	18 December 1969 (aged 19)		(Spain) Real Madrid
2	DF	Albert Ferrer	6 June 1970 (aged 18)		(Spain) Barcelona Atlètic
3	DF	Mikel Lasa	9 September 1971 (aged 17)		(Spain) San Sebastián
4	DF	Javier Torres Gómez	9 January 1970 (aged 19)		(Spain) Real Madrid
5	DF	Txomin Larrainzar	8 September 1969 (aged 19)		(Spain) Osasuna Promesas
6	MF	Felipe Herrero	18 June 1970 (aged 18)		(Spain) Real Madrid Castilla
7	FW	Antonio Pinilla	25 February 1971 (aged 17)		(Spain) Barcelona Atlètic
8	MF	David Villabona	5 December 1969 (aged 19)		(Spain) San Sebastián
9	MF	Alberto Aguilá	9 September 1970 (aged 18)		(Spain) Real Madrid
10	MF	Paqui Veza	6 December 1970 (aged 18)		(Spain) Barcelona
11	FW	Emilio Gutiérrez	4 January 1970 (aged 19)		(Spain) Barcelona
12	DF	Roberto Solozábal	15 September 1969 (aged 19)		(Spain) Atlético Madrileño
13	GK	Isidoro Cabrera	17 September 1969 (aged 19)		(Spain) Real Betis
14	DF	Miguel Cerdán	23 October 1969 (aged 19)		(Spain) Real Madrid
15	FW	Ismael Urzaiz	7 October 1971 (aged 17)		(Spain) Real Madrid Castilla
16	MF	Justo Ruiz	31 August 1969 (aged 19)		(Spain) Athletic Bilbao
17	DF	Álex García	14 January 1970 (aged 19)		(Spain) Barcelona
18	FW	Moisés García	10 July 1971 (aged 17)		(Spain) Deportivo Aragón
