= Miracle of Dammam =

- Event: 1989 FIFA World Youth Championship
Nigeria	Soviet Union
(Nigeria)	(Soviet Union)
4	4
- Nigeria won 5–3 on penalties
- Date: 25 February 1989
- Venue: Prince Mohamed bin Fahd Stadium, Dammam, Saudi Arabia
- Referee: Hubert Forstinger (Austria)
- Attendance: 10,000

The Miracle of Dammam also known as The Dammam Miracle was the name given to the result of a quarter-final football match between the Nigerian U-20 football team and the USSR U-20 football team at the 1989 FIFA World Youth Championship in Saudi Arabia which the Nigerian U-20 team went on to win on penalties. The match created a footballing record as Nigeria became the first team to come back from four goals down to equalize and then go on to win a FIFA World Cup match at any level.

== The match ==
=== Summary ===
The match was played at the Prince Mohamed bin Fahd Stadium in Dammam with an attendance of about 10,000 spectators. The Soviet Union raced to a four-goal lead within 46 minutes with a brace from Sergei Kiriakov in the 30th and 38th minutes with further goals from Bakhva Tedeev and Oleg Salenko in the 45th and 46th minutes respectively in a keenly contested match. With thirty minutes to full-time, Nigeria responded through a goal from Oladimeji Lawal in the 61st and one from Christopher Ohenhen in the 75th minutes. Samuel Elijah scored the third goal in the 83rd minute before the captain of the Nigerian team Nduka Ugbade completed the remarkable comeback with a goal in the 84th minute to end the game in a draw.

=== Details ===
25 February 1989
18:00 (UCT)

Soviet Union	4–4 (a.e.t.) (3–5 pen.)	Nigeria
Kiriakov 30', 58'; Tedeev 45'; Salenko 46'	Report	Ohenhen 61', 75'; Elijah 83'; Ugbade 84'

Prince Mohamed bin Fahd Stadium, Dammam
Attendance: 10,000
Referee: Hubert Forstinger (Austria)

=== Note ===
- Nigeria won the match on penalties and went on to become second at the tournament after losing to Portugal in the final.
