= Clas André Guttulsrød =

Norwegian footballer (born 1971)

Personal information
- Date of birth: 4 September 1971 (age 55)
- Height: 1.95 m (6 ft 5 in)
- Position: Goalkeeper

Youth career
- Ekholt
- Moss

Senior career*
Years	Team	Apps	(Gls)
1989–1990	Moss		
1990	→ Sarpsborg (loan)		
1991	Fredrikstad		
1991–1992	Moss		
1991	→ Kvik Halden (loan)		
1991	→ Sprint-Jeløy (loan)		
1993–1994	Orkdal		
1995–1997	Hamkam		
1998–2001	Bodø/Glimt	45	(0)
2000	→ Lillestrøm (loan)	1	(0)
2001	→ Oslo Øst (loan)		
2002–2003	Moss	19	(0)
2005	Sprint-Jeløy		

International career
1989	Norway U18	1	(0)

Managerial career
- Rapid Athene (youth)
- Moss (goalkeeper coach)
- * Club domestic league appearances and goals

Clas André Guttulsrød (born 4 September 1971) is a Norwegian retired professional footballer.

== Career ==
Guttulsrød started his career in Ekholt BK. He played for Moss' junior team alongside Thomas Myhre and Bård Harridsleff. He was also capped once for Norway U18. In late 1989 Guttulsrød was on trial with Portsmouth.

By 1990, Guttulsrød was still not a first choice in Moss, and when it seemed like he would not even become the second choice behind Trond Eriksen, he agreed to a loan to Sarpsborg FK for the duration of the 1990 season. Sarpsborg cancelled the loan, however, as Guttulsrød had to perform surgery on his meniscus in March 1990. After the 1990 season, Guttulsrød was contacted by Fredrikstad FK, while Moss recruited new goalkeepers. Guttulsrød wanted to join Moss' Østfold rival, but Moss and Fredrikstad could not agree on the transfer fee, and in April 1991 Guttulsrød annulled his stay at Fredrikstad. Moss did not have room for Guttulsrød, and loaned him out to Kvik Halden, who needed a new goalkeeper after Fredrikstad had recalled the loanee Roar Hagen after the purchase of Guttulsrød fell through. Guttulsrød made his debut for Kvik in May 1991. In August, Kvik made a move to recruit Roar Hagen again. Guttulsrød returned to Moss. The opportunity arose for a loan to SK Sprint-Jeløy, who used Guttulsrød's former teammate Bård Harridsleff, who broke a finger in August 1991. In his debut match for Sprint, Moss Avis named Guttulsrød man of the match.

He returned to Moss in 1992, but here he would compete with the increasingly apt Thomas Myhre, who was a Norway youth international (and future Premier League player). After the 1992 season, Guttulsrød wanted to leave Østfold altogether, and signed for Orkdal IL outside of Trondheim. He would play in the 1993 2. divisjon and work as a carpenter outside of football. Guttulsrød was also allowed to attend a few training sessions in Rosenborg BK.

Ahead of the 1995 season, Guttulsrød was assessed by Strindheim, who ultimately chose to sign Arne Bonde. Guttulsrød was also wanted by Råde, but a transfer back to Moss was more or less ready when Eliteserien club Hamarkameratene made an offer. Guttulsrød chose Hamkam and would finally play in Norway's highest league.

Ahead of the 1998 season Guttulsrød moved north to FK Bodø/Glimt. He was their undisputed first choice in 1998, being named as Bodø/Glimt's best player in some of the games. VG named him man of the match against his former club Moss in April, and Dagbladet did the same against Kongsvinger in May. Wrote the journalist, "If Guttulsrød continues in the same style, Bodø/Glimt will end highly in the Tippeliga table". He also played against FC Vaduz in the 1999–2000 UEFA Cup qualifying round, keeping a clean sheet, and then played in the 1–1 away draw against Werder Bremen.

Ahead of the 1999 Eliteserien season, Aftenposten named Guttulsrød the 10th best goalkeeper in the league. By the late summer, however, Guttulsrød found himself in last place among Eliteserien's goalkeepers in both VG and Dagbladet's grade system, where he had accumulated an average score of 4.24 and 4.4 points respectively (out of 10). He was challenged by Tor Egil Horn, who played several games.

Bodø/Glimt also brought Runar Bjørklund on trial in the middle of the season. After the 1999 season, Bodø/Glimt reportedly tried to buy Terje Skjeldestad in exchange for Guttulsrød or Horn. Sogndal rejected the offer. Eventually, Bodø/Glimt bought back their former goalkeeper Rohnny Westad. The manager hose to mostly field Westad in 2000, with Horn getting a stint in goal during the summer, whereas Guttulsrød was not even allowed on the bench.

In August 2000, he was loaned out to Lillestrøm as a cover while Emille Baron contested the 2000 Summer Olympics. In September 2001 he was loaned out to FK Oslo Øst where he helped finalize the promotion from the 2001 2. divisjon. In November 2001, his contract with Bodø/Glimt had expired, and he was not offered a deal in Oslo Øst either. Going clubless until January 2002, he was picked up by Moss FK as a challenger to Per-Morten Kristiansen. Guttulsrød signed a two-year contract.

In late 2002, Moss were battling against relegation from the 2002 Eliteserien. At a time when Guttulsrød had dislocated a little finger and kept it in a splint, he was suddenly fielded against his old club Bodø/Glimt as well as Stabæk. Moss had no other goalkeeper available, with player-manager and central defender Rune Tangen being their only conceivable backup. Guttulsrød still had residence in Bodø, where he worked on refurnishing his house before selling it and moving back to South Norway permanently. During the Bodø/Glimt game, Guttulsrød was pelted with snowballs. Following a 2–7 loss against Stabæk, Moss were relegated from the 2002 Eliteserien. Despite conceding 7 goals, Guttulsrød's performance was described as "above par".

Per-Morten Kristiansen tore a cruciate ligament in October 2002, and also missed the start of 2003 due to surgery and reconvalescence. In March 2003, Moss decided on Guttusrød as their first-choice goalkeeper in the 2003 1. divisjon. While the club considered other options, they rejected triallist Pieter Meuleman. As the season transpired, Guttulsrød played regularly until early August. At that point, manager Rune Tangen decided to revert to using Per-Morten Kristiansen in goal. Moss Avis described the change as "somewhat radical" because Guttulsrød had been "the best MFK player so far this year". Tangen conceded that the substitution "is maybe a little unfair towards Clas". Only days later, Moss FK let Guttulsrød know that his contract would not be extended. The decision was financial, but also grounded in Guttulsrød's age being too high. Guttulsrød requested an immediate transfer to another club. Following a hiatus from football in 2004, Guttulsrød signed for Sprint-Jeløy to strengthen their squad in the 2005 2. divisjon. He was injured during parts of the season.

== Coaching career ==
Continuing within football, Guttulsrød was a youth coach in Rapid Athene as well as goalkeeper coach in Moss FK.
