= Terje Olsen =

Terje Olsen may refer to:

- Terje Olsen (politician), former county mayor of Troms
- Terje Olsen (footballer, born 1950), Norway international footballer who played for Vålerenga and Lillestrøm
- Terje Olsen (footballer, born 1965), Norwegian footballer who played for Skeid, Strømmen and Vålerenga
- Terje Olsen (footballer, born 1970), Norwegian footballer who played for Bayer Leverkusen
- Todd Terje (born Terje Olsen, 1981), Norwegian DJ, songwriter, and record producer
