= 1987 FIFA U-16 World Championship =

International football competition

Coupe du Monde de Football des Moins de 16 ans 1987 (French)

Tournament details
- Host country: Canada
- Dates: 12–25 July
- Teams: 16 (from 6 confederations)
- Venues: 4 (in 4 host cities)

Final positions
- Champions: Soviet Union (1st title)
- Runners-up: Nigeria
- Third place: Ivory Coast
- Fourth place: Italy

Tournament statistics
- Matches played: 32
- Goals scored: 82 (2.56 per match)
- Attendance: 169,160 (5,286 per match)
- Top scorer(s): (Ivory Coast) Moussa Traor (Soviet Union) Yuri Nikiforov (5 goals each)
- Best player: (Nigeria) Philip Osondu
- Fair play award: Soviet Union

The 1987 FIFA U-16 World Championship, the second edition of the tournament, was hosted by Canada and held in the cities of Montreal, Saint John, St. John's, and Toronto between 12 and 25 July 1987. Players born after 1 August 1970 could participate in this tournament.

== Venues ==
The cities of Montreal, Saint John, St. John's, and Toronto hosted tournament matches.

1987 FIFA U-16 World Championship (Canada)	Toronto	St. John's
1987 FIFA U-16 World Championship (Canada)	Varsity Stadium	King George V Park
1987 FIFA U-16 World Championship (Canada)	43°40′0″N 79°23′50″W	47°34′39″N 52°42′5″W
1987 FIFA U-16 World Championship (Canada)	Capacity: 21,739	Capacity: 10,000
1987 FIFA U-16 World Championship (Canada)	Montreal	Saint John
1987 FIFA U-16 World Championship (Canada)	Complexe sportif Claude-Robillard	Canada Games Stadium
1987 FIFA U-16 World Championship (Canada)	45°33′14.83″N 73°38′11.87″W	45°18′16″N 66°5′15″W
1987 FIFA U-16 World Championship (Canada)	Capacity: 9,000	Capacity: 5,000

== Qualified teams ==
Confederation	Qualifying Tournament	Qualifier(s)
AFC (Asia)	1986 AFC U-16 Championship	South Korea; Qatar; Saudi Arabia
CAF (Africa)	1987 African U-16 Qualifying for World Cup	Ivory Coast; Egypt; Nigeria
CONCACAF (Central, North America and Caribbean)	Host nation	Canada
CONCACAF (Central, North America and Caribbean)	1987 CONCACAF U-17 Championship	Mexico; United States
CONMEBOL (South America)	1986 South American U-16 Championship	Bolivia; Brazil; Ecuador
OFC (Oceania)	1986 OFC U-17 Championship	Australia
UEFA (Europe)	1987 UEFA European Under-16 Championship	France; Italy; Soviet Union

== Squads ==
For full squad lists for the 1987 U-16 World Championship see 1987 FIFA U-16 World Championship Squads.

== Referees ==
Asia

- (Israel) Itzhak Ben Itzhak
- (Kuwait) Ibrahim Al-Jassas
- (South Korea) Lee Do-Ha
- (Bahrain) Jassim Mandi

Africa

- (Republic of the Congo) Simon Bantsimba
- (Egypt) Mohamed Hafez
- (Tunisia) Naji Jouini

North America, Central America and the Caribbean

- (Mexico) Arturo Brizio Carter
- (United States) David DiPlacido
- (Canada) Antonio Evangelista
- (Costa Rica) Berny Ulloa Morera

South America

- (Ecuador) Jorge Orellano
- (Bolivia) Juan Ortube
- (Brazil) José Roberto Wright

Europe

- (Netherlands) John Blankenstein
- (Scotland) Kenny Hope
- (Soviet Union) Alexey Spirin

Oceania

- (New Zealand) Ken Wallace

== Group stage ==
=== Group A ===
Pos	Team	Pld	W	D	L	GF	GA	GD	Pts	Qualification
1	Italy	3	2	1	0	5	1	+4	5	Advance to knockout stage
2	Qatar	3	2	1	0	4	2	+2	5	Advance to knockout stage
3	Egypt	3	1	0	2	3	2	+1	2	
4	Canada (H)	3	0	0	3	1	8	−7	0	

Source: FIFA
(H) Hosts
12 July 1987
14:00

Italy	3–0	Canada
Melli 22'; Pessotto 36'; Gallo 68'	(Report)

Attendance: 13,500
Referee: Arturo Brizio Carter
12 July 1987
16:00

Qatar	1–0	Egypt
Hassan 21'	(Report)

Attendance: 13,500
Referee: David DiPlacido

14 July 1987
18:00

Italy	1–1	Qatar
Cappellini 67'	(Report)	Khairi 76'

Attendance: 5,200
Referee: Jorge Orellana
14 July 1987
20:00

Canada	0–3	Egypt
	(Report)	Hussain 14'; Musaed 48'; Ramadan 53'

Attendance: 5,200
Referee: Kenneth Wallace

16 July 1987
17:45

Italy	1–0	Egypt
Gallo 69'	(Report)

Attendance: 6,500
Referee: John Blankenstein
16 July 1987
19:45

Canada	1–2	Qatar
Titotto 25'	(Report)	Yousuf 3'; Suwaid 23'

Attendance: 6,500
Referee: Juan Ortube

=== Group B ===
Venue: King George V Park, St. John's

Teams	Pld	W	D	L	GF	GA	GD	Pts	Status
Ivory Coast	3	2	1	0	3	1	2	5	Advanced to the quarterfinals
South Korea	3	1	1	1	5	4	1	3	Advanced to the quarterfinals
Ecuador	3	1	0	2	1	2	-1	2	Eliminated
United States	3	1	0	2	3	5	-2	2	Eliminated

12 July 1987
18:00

Ivory Coast	1–1	South Korea
Dea 9'	(Report)	Shin Tae-Yong 53'

Attendance: 1,000
Referee: Berny Ulloa Morera
12 July 1987
20:00

United States	1–0	Ecuador
Crawley 47'	(Report)

Attendance: 1,000
Referee: Naji Jouini

14 July 1987
18:00

Ivory Coast	1–0	United States
Bassole 52'	(Report)

Attendance: 2,200
Referee: Jassim Mandi
14 July 1987
20:00

South Korea	0–1	Ecuador
	(Report)	Ramos 47'

Attendance: 2,200
Referee: Itzhak Ben Itzhak

16 July 1987
18:00

Ivory Coast	1–0	Ecuador
Traore 68'	(Report)

Attendance: 2,250
Referee: Berny Ulloa Morera
16 July 1987
20:00

South Korea	4–2	United States
Noh Jung-yoon 25'; Shin Tae-Yong 50'; Lee Tae-hong 65'; Kim In-wan 72'	(Report)	Snow 40'; Deering 48'

Attendance: 2,250
Referee: Naji Jouini

=== Group C ===
Venue: Complexe sportif Claude-Robillard, Montreal

Teams	Pld	W	D	L	GF	GA	GD	Pts	Status
Australia	3	2	0	1	3	4	-1	4	Advanced to the quarterfinals
France	3	1	1	1	4	3	1	3	Advanced to the quarterfinals
Saudi Arabia	3	1	1	1	2	1	1	3	Eliminated
Brazil	3	0	2	1	0	1	-1	2	Eliminated

13 July 1987
18:00

Brazil	0–0	France
	(Report)

Attendance: 5,400
Referee: Lee Do Ha
13 July 1987
20:00

Saudi Arabia	0–1	Australia
	(Report)	Horvat 71'

Attendance: 5,400
Referee: Antonio Evangelista

15 July 1987
18:00

Brazil	0–0	Saudi Arabia
	(Report)

Attendance: 4,400
Referee: Alexey Spirin
15 July 1987
20:00

France	4–1	Australia
Debève 14', 23', 31'; Rincon 24' (pen.)	(Report)	Georgakis 73'

Attendance: 4,400
Referee: Simon Bantsimba

17 July 1987
18:00

Brazil	0–1	Australia
	(Report)	Richardson 74'

Attendance: 5,400
Referee: Lee Do Ha
17 July 1987
20:00

France	0–2	Saudi Arabia
	(Report)	Zayed 18'; Shalgan 34'

Attendance: 5,400
Referee: Alexey Spirin

=== Group D ===
Venue: Jeux Canada Games Stadium, Saint John

Teams	Pld	W	D	L	GF	GA	GD	Pts	Status
Soviet Union	3	2	1	0	12	3	9	5	Advanced to the quarterfinals
Nigeria	3	1	1	1	4	4	0	3	Advanced to the quarterfinals
Mexico	3	1	1	1	3	9	-6	3	Eliminated
Bolivia	3	0	1	2	6	9	-3	1	Eliminated

12 July 1987
18:00

Soviet Union	1–1	Nigeria
Rusin 61'	(Report)	Eke 79'

Attendance: 2,695
Referee: José Ramiz Wright
12 July 1987
20:00

Mexico	2–2	Bolivia
Landa 56'; Romero 76'	(Report)	Lobo 50'; Cristaldo 53'

Attendance: 2,695
Referee: Mohamed Hafez

14 July 1987
18:00

Soviet Union	7–0	Mexico
Matveyev 13', 25'; Nikiforov 31', 51'; Mushchynka 47'; Kadyrov 64'; Bezhenar 72' pen	(Report)

Attendance: 2,335
Referee: Kenneth Hope
14 July 1987
20:00

Nigeria	3–2	Bolivia
Osondu 24', 66', 77'	(Report)	Cristaldo 26'; Arandia 70'

Attendance: 2,335
Referee: Essa Al-Jassas

16 July 1987
18:00

Soviet Union	4–2	Bolivia
Nikiforov 28'; Bezhenar 32' (pen.); Asadov 44'; Mushchynka 50'	(Report)	Urquiza 59' (pen.); Etcheverry 73'

Attendance: 3,300
Referee: Kenneth Hope
16 July 1987
20:00

Nigeria	0–1	Mexico
	(Report)	Rivera 55'

Attendance: 3,300
Referee: José Ramiz Wright

== Knockout stage ==
Quarter-finals
19 July – Toronto
Italy	2
South Korea	0
19 July – Montreal
Australia	0
Nigeria	1
19 July – Saint John
Ivory Coast	3
Qatar	0
19 July – Saint John
Soviet Union	3
France	2

Semi-finals
22 July – Toronto
Italy	0
Nigeria	1
22 July – Saint John
Ivory Coast	1
Soviet Union	5

Final
25 July – Toronto
Nigeria	1 (2)
Soviet Union (p)	1 (4)
Third place play-off
24 July – Saint John
Italy	1
Ivory Coast (a.e.t.)	2

=== Quarter-finals ===
19 July 1987
14:00

Italy	2–0	South Korea
Cappellini 52'; Gallo 54'	(Report)

Varsity Stadium, Toronto
Attendance: 10,400
Referee: Kenneth Wallace

19 July 1987
14:00

Ivory Coast	3–0	Qatar
Bassole 16'; Beda 52'; Traoré 66'	(Report)

Jeux Canada Games Stadium, Saint John
Attendance: 1,500
Referee: Berny Ulloa Morera

19 July 1987
14:00

Australia	0–1	Nigeria
	(Report)	Nwosu 59'

Complexe sportif Claude-Robillard, Montreal
Attendance: 5,200
Referee: Antonio Evangelista

19 July 1987
14:00

Soviet Union	3–2	France
Arutyunian 40', 60'; Nikiforov 76'	(Report)	Adrian 49'; Roche 65'

Jeux Canada Games Stadium, Saint John
Attendance: 5,000
Referee: José Ramiz Wright

=== Semi-finals ===
22 July 1987
20:00

Italy	0–1	Nigeria
	(Report)	Nwosu 63'

Exhibition Stadium, Toronto
Attendance: 20,000
Referee: John Blankenstein

22 July 1987
19:00

Ivory Coast	1–5	Soviet Union
Traoré 57'	(Report)	Arutyunian 1', 38'; Kasimov 10', 56'; Rusin 77'

Jeux Canada Games Stadium, Saint John
Attendance: 2,500
Referee: Arturo Brizio Carter

=== Third place play-off ===
24 July 1987
19:00

Italy	1–2 (a.e.t.)	Ivory Coast
Bocchialini 57'	(Report)	Traoré 17', 96'

Jeux Canada Games Stadium, Saint John
Attendance: 1,000
Referee: Antonio Evangelista

=== Final ===
25 July 1987
15:00

Nigeria	1–1	Soviet Union
Osondu 11'	(Report)	Nikiforov 6'
Penalties
	2–4

Varsity Stadium, Toronto
Attendance: 15,000
Referee: José Ramiz Wright

== Statistics ==
=== Goalscorers ===
There were 82 goals scored in 32 matches, for an average of 2.56 goals per match.

5 goals

- (Ivory Coast) Moussa Traoré
- (Soviet Union) Yuri Nikiforov

4 goals

- (Nigeria) Philip Osondu
- (Soviet Union) Sergei Arutyunian

3 goals

- (France) Mickaël Debève
- (Italy) Fabio Gallo

2 goals

- (Bolivia) Luis Cristaldo
- (Italy) Massimiliano Cappellini
- (Ivory Coast) Michel Bassole
- (Nigeria) Christopher Nwosu
- (South Korea) Shin Tae-Yong
- (Soviet Union) Anatoly Mushinka
- (Soviet Union) Mirdjalal Kasimov
- (Soviet Union) Nikolai Rusin
- (Soviet Union) Oleh Matveyev
- (Soviet Union) Serhiy Bezhenar

1 goal

- (Australia) Phillip Richardson
- (Australia) Steve Georgakis
- (Australia) Steve Horvat
- (Bolivia) Hebert Arandia
- (Bolivia) Manuel Lobo
- (Bolivia) Marco Etcheverry
- (Bolivia) Marcos Urquiza
- (Canada) Guido Titotto
- (Ecuador) Victor Ramos
- (Egypt) Gamal Musaed
- (Egypt) Hany Hussain
- (Egypt) Mohamed Ramadan
- (France) David Rincon
- (France) Gilles Adrian
- (France) Stephane Roche
- (Italy) Carlo Bocchialini
- (Italy) Gianluca Pessotto
- (Italy) Marcello Melli
- (Ivory Coast) Beda Beda
- (Ivory Coast) Lama Dea
- (Mexico) Carlos Rivera
- (Mexico) Daniel Landa
- (Mexico) Ramiro Romero
- (Nigeria) Albert Eke
- (Qatar) Abdulla Hassan
- (Qatar) Abdulla Yousuf
- (Qatar) Edress Khairi
- (Qatar) Rashid Suwaid
- (Saudi Arabia) Mohammed Shalgan
- (Saudi Arabia) Turki Zayed
- (South Korea) Kim In-wan
- (South Korea) Lee Tae-hong
- (South Korea) Noh Jung-yoon
- (Soviet Union) Vladislav Kadyrov
- (Soviet Union) Arif Asadov
- (United States) Ben Crawley
- (United States) Chad Deering
- (United States) Steve Snow

=== Tournament ranking ===
Per statistical convention in football, matches decided in extra time are counted as wins and losses, while matches decided by penalty shoot-outs are counted as draws.

Pos	Grp	Team	Pld	W	D	L	GF	GA	GD	Pts	Final result
1	D	Soviet Union	15	4	2	9	21	7	+14	10	Champions
2	D	Nigeria	6	3	2	1	7	5	+2	8	Runners-up
3	B	Ivory Coast	6	4	1	1	9	7	+2	9	Third place
4	A	Italy	6	3	1	2	8	4	+4	7	Fourth place
5	A	Qatar	4	2	1	1	4	5	−1	5	Eliminated in quarter-finals
6	D	Australia	4	2	0	2	3	5	−2	4	Eliminated in quarter-finals
7	C	France	4	1	1	2	6	6	0	3	Eliminated in quarter-finals
8	B	South Korea	4	1	1	2	5	6	−1	3	Eliminated in quarter-finals
9	C	Saudi Arabia	3	1	1	1	2	1	+1	3	Eliminated in group stage
10	D	Mexico	3	1	1	1	3	9	−6	3	Eliminated in group stage
11	A	Egypt	3	1	0	2	3	2	+1	2	Eliminated in group stage
12	B	Ecuador	3	1	0	2	1	2	−1	2	Eliminated in group stage
13	B	United States	3	1	0	2	3	5	−2	2	Eliminated in group stage
14	C	Brazil	3	0	2	1	0	1	−1	2	Eliminated in group stage
15	D	Bolivia	3	0	1	2	6	9	−3	1	Eliminated in group stage
16	A	Canada (H)	3	0	0	3	1	8	−7	0	Eliminated in group stage

Source: FIFA
(H) Hosts

== Awards ==
Golden Ball	Silver Ball	Bronze Ball
(Nigeria) Philip Osondu	Not awarded	Not awarded
Golden Boot	Silver Boot	Bronze Boot
(Ivory Coast) Moussa Traoré 5 goals	(Soviet Union) Yuriy Nikiforov 5 goals	(Nigeria) Philip Osondu (Soviet Union) Sergei Arutyunian 4 goals
FIFA Fair Play Trophy
Soviet Union
