= Jiří Novák (disambiguation) =

Jiří Novák (born 1975) is a Czech tennis player.

Jiří Novák may also refer to:

- Jiří Novák (footballer) (born 1969), Czech football striker
- Jiří Novák (ice hockey) (born 1950), Czechoslovak ice hockey player
- Jiří Tibor Novak (born 1947), Czech-born Australian artist, illustrator, and writer
