= Anatoliy Mushchynka =

Ukrainian and German footballer

Personal information
- Full name: Anatoliy Mykhailovych Mushchynka
- Date of birth: 19 August 1970 (age 56)
- Place of birth: Mukachevo, Ukrainian SSR, Soviet Union
- Height: 1.69 m (5 ft 7 in)
- Position: Midfielder

Senior career*
Years	Team	Apps	(Gls)
1987	SKA Karpaty Lviv	2	(0)
1988–1989	Dynamo Kyiv	0	(0)
1990–1992	Karpaty Lviv	78	(11)
1992–1993	Metalurh Zaporizhzhia	28	(8)
1993–1999	FC 08 Homburg	137	(18)
1999–2003	1. FC Saarbrucken	111	(7)
2003–2005	SV Röchling Völklingen		
2005–2008	VfB Waldmohr		

International career
1987	Soviet Union U-16		
1988	Soviet Union U-19	2	(2)
1993	Ukraine	1	(0)
Medal record
Men's football
Representing Soviet Union
FIFA U-16 World Championship
Winner	1987 Canada
UEFA European U-19 Championships
Winner	1988 Czechoslovakia
UEFA European U-16 Championships
Runner-up	1987 France
- * Club domestic league appearances and goals

Anatoliy Mykhailovych Mushchynka (Ukrainian: Анатолій Михайлович Мущинка; born 19 August 1970) is a retired Ukrainian and German professional footballer. He is the author of the very first goal of Ukrainian Premier League.

Mushchynka played only one game for Ukraine against Israel on 27 April 1993 in Odesa.
