= Norbert Juračka =

Slovak footballer

Personal information
- Date of birth: 3 January 1970 (age 56)
- Position: Goalkeeper

Senior career*
Years	Team	Apps	(Gls)
1988–1994	Dukla Banská Bystrica		
1995–1996	Baník Ostrava		
1996	1. FC Košice		
1997	Artmedia Petržalka		
1997–2000	Dukla Banská Bystrica		

International career
- Czechoslovakia U20
- Czechoslovakia U21
- * Club domestic league appearances and goals

Norbert Juračka (born 3 January 1970) is a retired Slovak football goalkeeper.

A youth international for Czechoslovakia, Juračka was a squad member at the 1989 FIFA World Youth Championship and the 1990 and 1992 UEFA European Under-21 Championship.
