= Arne Bonde =

Arne Bonde may refer to:

- Arne Bonde (editor)
- Arne Bonde (footballer)
