= Tozé =

Tozé may refer to:

- António José Alves Ribeiro, Portuguese former football forward
- António José Azevedo Pereira, Portuguese former football midfielder
- António José Pinheiro Carvalho, Portuguese football midfielder
- Tozé Marreco, Portuguese football striker and manager
