= Oladimeji =

Nigerian given name

- Gender: Male
- Language: Yoruba

Origin
- Origin: Nigeria
- Meaning: My wealth is doubled.
- Region of origin: South West, Nigeria

Oladimeji is a Nigerian male given name and surname of Yoruba origin. It means "My wealth is doubled.

Notable individuals with the name include:

- Meji Alabi (Oladimeji Alabi-Isama, born 13 December 1988)
- MohBad (Ilerioluwa Oladimeji Aloba, 3 January 1996 – 12 September 2023), Nigerian musician
- Oladimeji Lawal (born 24 July 1971), Nigerian footballer
- Dimeji Bankole (born 14 November 1969), Nigerian politician
