= Ruidíaz =

Ruidíaz or Ruidiaz is a surname. Notable people with the surname include:

- Alejandro Ruidiaz (born 1969), Argentine footballer
- Raúl Ruidíaz (born 1990), Peruvian footballer
