= Stade Municipal de Commune II =

Football stadium in Bamako, Mali

Stade Municipal de Commune II is located in Bamako, Mali. It is used mostly for football and serves as the home stadium of AS Commune II. The stadium has a capacity of 3,000.
