= Moussa Traoré (footballer, born 1971) =

Ivorian footballer

Personal information
- Date of birth: 25 December 1971 (age 54)
- Place of birth: Treichville, Abidjan, Ivory Coast
- Height: 1.74 m (5 ft 9 in)
- Position: Forward

Senior career*
Years	Team	Apps	(Gls)
1989	Rio Sport d'Anyama		
1990–1991	Rennes	15	(0)
1991–1996	Olympique Alès	164	(34)
1996–1997	Angers	15	(3)
1999–2000	US Créteil-Lusitanos	59	(14)
2001–2002	Al-Shabab		
2002–2003	Choisy-le-Roi		
2003–2007	US Stade Tamponnaise		

International career
1987	Ivory Coast U17	6	(5)
1992–1998	Ivory Coast	15	(1)
Medal record
Men's football
Representing Ivory Coast
Africa Cup of Nations
Winner	1992 Senegal
FIFA U-17 World Cup
Third place	1987 Canada
- * Club domestic league appearances and goals

Moussa Traoré (born 25 December 1971) is an Ivorian former professional footballer who played as a forward.

== Career ==
Traoré started his career in the Ivory Coast at Rio Sport in Anyama.

In 1987, he won the Golden Shoe award at the FIFA U-17 World Cup.

He moved to France as a teenager to further his playing career in 1990. Later, he became a member of the Ivory Coast team that won the Africa Cup of Nations in 1992. He played in two further continental competitions in 1996 and 1998 for the Elephants. He also featured in an unsuccessful campaign to qualify for the 1994 FIFA World Cup.
