= Torsten Raspe =

German footballer

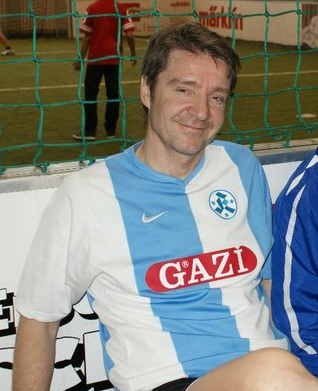

Personal information
- Date of birth: 1 August 1969 (age 57)
- Place of birth: Merseburg, East Germany
- Height: 1.83 m (6 ft 0 in)
- Position: Midfielder

Youth career
- BSG Chemie Buna Schkopau

Senior career*
Years	Team	Apps	(Gls)
1987–1990	Hallescher FC Chemie	8	(1)
1989–1990	BSG Chemie Buna Schkopau	12	(2)
1990–1995	SSV Ulm 1846	161	(16)
1995–2001	Stuttgarter Kickers	168	(9)
2001–2003	Rot-Weiß Erfurt	55	(1)
2003–2004	TSV Schönaich	8	(1)
2004–2008	VfL Kirchheim/Teck		
2008–2011	FSV Waiblingen		
2011–2013	SV Hegnach		

International career
	East Germany U21	30	(0)
- * Club domestic league appearances and goals

Torsten Raspe (born 1 August 1969) is a retired German football midfielder who played for Hallescher FC Chemie, SSV Ulm 1846, Stuttgarter Kickers, Rot-Weiß Erfurt and VfL Kirchheim/Teck.

He was a part of the East German squad at the 1989 FIFA World Youth Championship, playing all three matches.
