= Leif Andersen =

Norwegian footballer (born 1971)

Personal information
- Date of birth: 19 April 1971 (age 55)
- Place of birth: Fredrikstad, Norway
- Position: Defender

Youth career
- ?–1992: Råde

Senior career*
Years	Team	Apps	(Gls)
1992	Kongsvinger	?	(?)
1993–1995	Moss FK	?	(?)
1995–1997	Crystal Palace	30	(1)
1997–1999	Moss FK	38	(2)
1999–2000	Sarpsborg FK	?	(?)
2001–2002	Rygge IL	?	(?)
2003	Østsiden IL	?	(?)
- * Club domestic league appearances and goals

Leif Andersen (born 19 April 1971) is a Norwegian retired professional footballer who played as a defender. He spent most of his career in Norwegian domestic football, but also spent one and a half seasons with English Football League club Crystal Palace.

== Playing career ==
Andersen began his youth career with Rade before signing with Kongsvinger in 1992. In 1993, he moved to Moss FK and in January 1996 signed for English club Crystal Palace, at that time playing in the Football League Championship. He went on to make 16 appearances in the second half of the season without scoring and a further 14 appearances (one goal) in the 1996–97 season, at the end of which Palace were promoted to the Premier League via the play-offs.

However, in May 1997, Andersen returned to Moss FK, where he made 38 appearances over the next two years, scoring twice. He then moved to Sarpsborg FK in 1999, before joining Rygge IL in 2001 and Østsiden IL in 2003 where he finished his senior career.
