= Jiří Novák (footballer) =

Czech footballer

Personal information
- Date of birth: 26 October 1969 (age 57)
- Position: Forward

Senior career*
Years	Team	Apps	(Gls)
1988–1994	Slavia Prague		
1991	→ Dukla Prague		
1993	→ Fortuna Düsseldorf		
1993	→ Slovan Liberec		
1994–1995	Jablonec		
1995	České Budějovice		
1996–2000	Bohemians		

International career
- Czechoslovakia U20
- Czechoslovakia U21
- * Club domestic league appearances and goals

Jiří Novák (born 26 October 1969) is a retired Czech football striker.

A youth international for Czechoslovakia, Novák was a squad member at the 1989 FIFA World Youth Championship and the 1992 UEFA European Under-21 Championship.
