= Vidar Martinsen =

Norwegian footballer (born 1982)

Personal information
- Date of birth: 11 March 1982 (age 44)
- Place of birth: Råde, Norway
- Height: 1.82 m (5 ft 11 1/2 in)
- Position: Defender

Team information
- Current team: Råde

Senior career*
Years	Team	Apps	(Gls)
–2001	Råde		
2002–2006	Moss	104	(9)
2007–2014	Fredrikstad	158	(7)
2015–	Råde		
- * Club domestic league appearances and goals as of 10 August 2014

Vidar Martinsen (born 11 March 1982) is a Norwegian footballer currently playing for Råde IL after eight seasons in the Norwegian Fredrikstad.

== Career statistics ==
Season	Club	Division	League		Cup		Total	
Season	Club	Division	Apps	Goals	Apps	Goals	Apps	Goals
2002	Moss	Tippeligaen	6	0	0	0	6	0
2003	Moss	Adeccoligaen	27	3	3	0	30	3
2004	Moss	Adeccoligaen	25	1	1	0	26	1
2005	Moss	Adeccoligaen	28	2	0	0	28	2
2006	Moss	Adeccoligaen	18	3	1	0	19	3
2007	Fredrikstad	Tippeligaen	6	0	0	0	6	0
2008	Fredrikstad	Tippeligaen	7	0	2	0	9	0
2009	Fredrikstad	Tippeligaen	24	1	3	1	27	2
2010	Fredrikstad	Adeccoligaen	25	3	2	0	27	3
2011	Fredrikstad	Tippeligaen	22	0	5	2	27	2
2012	Fredrikstad	Tippeligaen	23	0	2	0	25	0
2013	Fredrikstad	Adeccoligaen	23	2	2	0	25	2
2014	Fredrikstad	1. divisjon	28	1	1	0	29	1
Career Total			262	16	22	3	284	19
