= Peter Ogaba =

Nigerian footballer (1974–2016)

Personal information
- Full name: Peter Egboche Ogaba
- Date of birth: 24 September 1974
- Place of birth: Jos, Nigeria
- Date of death: 5 August 2016 (aged 41)
- Place of death: Abuja, Nigeria
- Position: Defender

Youth career
- BBL Hawks

Senior career*
| Years | Team | Apps | (Gls) |
| 1991–1993 | Lokeren | 11 | (0) |
| 1993 | → FC Oulu (loan) | 8 | (0) |
| 1993–1994 | MSV Duisburg | 2 | (0) |
| 1996–1997 | Beja | | |
| 1998 | Leiftur | 15 | (0) |
| 1998–2000 | Holstebro | | |

International career
| 1987 | Nigeria U17 | 6 | (0) |
| 1989 | Nigeria U20 | 4 | (0) |
Medal record
Men's football
Representing Nigeria
FIFA U-17 World Cup
| Runner-up | 1987 Canada |
FIFA World Youth Championship
| Runner-up | 1989 Saudi Arabia |
- * Club domestic league appearances and goals

Peter Egboche Ogaba (24 September 1974 – 5 August 2016) was a Nigerian footballer who played as a defender.

== Club career ==
Ogaba started his career with Belgian top flight side Lokeren, where he suffered a knee ligament injury and made 11 league appearances and scored 0 goals. On 23 May 1992, Ogaba debuted for Lokeren during a 1-1 draw with Charleroi. In 1993, he signed for FC Oulu in the Finnish second division. In July 1993 he signed for German Bundesliga club MSV Duisburg. After that, Ogaba signed for Beja in the Portuguese second division. In 1998, he signed for Icelandic team Leiftur. after that, he signed for Holstebro in Denmark.

== International career ==
Ogaba represented Nigeria at the 1987 FIFA U-16 World Championship and the 1989 FIFA World Youth Championship, where he was the youngest player, aged 14.

== Personal life ==
Ogaba died in his apartment in Abuja, Nigeria, on 5 August 2016 after a brief illness, which was suspected to be due to heart disease.
