= Bjørnar Johannessen =

Norwegian footballer (born 1977)

Personal information
- Date of birth: 23 September 1977 (age 49)
- Height: 1.76 m (5 ft 9 in)
- Position: Midfielder

Senior career*
Years	Team	Apps	(Gls)
- Vesterøy
- Lisleby
- Råde
- Eik-Tønsberg
2002–2004	Fredrikstad		
2005–2007	Sparta Sarpsborg		
2008–2009	Moss		
2009	Sarpsborg 08	9	(5)
2010–2015	Kråkerøy		
2016–2018	Hvaler		

Managerial career
- 2010–: Kråkerøy
- * Club domestic league appearances and goals

Bjørnar Johannessen (born 23 September 1977) is a retired Norwegian football midfielder who manages Kråkerøy IL.

He started his career in Vesterøy, and went on to Lisleby, Råde and Eik-Tønsberg. He then joined Fredrikstad FK, and helped win promotion to the Norwegian Premier League. He got eighteen Premier League games in 2004 without scoring. Ahead of the 2005 season he joined Sparta Sarpsborg, and ahead of the 2008 season he joined Moss FK. He joined Sarpsborg 08 in the middle of the 2009-season, and decided to retire at the end of the season. Johannessen became player-coach at Kråkerøy IL in 2010.
