= Morten Svalstad =

Norwegian footballer and coach (born 1969)

Personal information
- Date of birth: 25 September 1969 (age 57)
- Place of birth: Norway
- Position: Goalkeeper

Youth career
- Nybygda
- Lillestrøm

Senior career*
Years	Team	Apps	(Gls)
1987	Lillestrøm	0	(0)
1988–1994	Hamarkameratene	80	(0)
- * Club domestic league appearances and goals

Morten Svalstad (born 25 September 1969) is a Norwegian former football and later coach, who played for the clubs Lillestrøm and Hamarkameratene.

== Club career ==
Svalstad started his football career at Nybygda IL, moving on to Lillestrøm, where he did not play any league games at senior level. In 1988 he moved to Hamarkameratene, where he stayed until the end of the 1994 season and played 80 league games, and 91 games in total. Hamarkameratene played in Tippeligaen from 1992 to 1995, but for the 1993 season, Svalstad was demoted to second choice behind André Ulla for all matches except the home game against Fyllingen (3–0).

== International career ==
Svalstad played a number of age group matches for Norway from U-15 to U-21. He played for Norway in numerous youth internationals, including the 1989 FIFA World Youth Championship, where Norway finished third in their group.

== Coaching career ==
After retiring from football, Svalstad was coach of the women's team at Brumunddal Fotball, along with Kristin Bekkevold. In 2017 he took over Brumunddal's men's team.
