= Jorge Amaral =

Portuguese football manager and former player

Personal information
- Full name: Jorge Amaral Rodrigues
- Date of birth: 1 June 1970 (age 56)
- Place of birth: João Belo, Portuguese Mozambique
- Height: 1.77 m (5 ft 10 in)
- Position: Winger

Youth career
- 1983−1988: Sporting CP

Senior career*
Years	Team	Apps	(Gls)
1988−1994	Sporting CP	29	(0)
1988−1989	→ Académico Viseu (loan)	30	(1)
1994−1995	Benfica	11	(1)
1995−1996	Felgueiras	23	(4)
1996−1997	Belenenses	14	(0)
1997−1999	Vitória Setúbal	31	(2)
1999−2000	Santa Clara	13	(1)
2000−2002	Atlético	43	(9)
2002−2004	Olhanense	49	(0)
2004−2005	Beira-Mar Monte Gordo	8	(0)
Total		251	(18)

International career
1985−1986	Portugal U16	14	(0)
1986−1988	Portugal U18	10	(2)
1989	Portugal U20	3	(1)
1990−1992	Portugal U21	9	(1)

Managerial career
- 2004–2005: Seixal
- 2006: Peniche
- 2006–2007: Estoril (assistant)
- 2008: Fabril
- 2009–2010: Peniche
- 2010: Real Massamá
- 2015–2016: Pescadores
Medal record
Men's football
Representing Portugal
FIFA U-20 World Cup
Winner	1989 Saudi Arabia
- * Club domestic league appearances and goals

Jorge Amaral Rodrigues CvIH (born 1 June 1970), known as Amaral, is a former Portuguese professional footballer who played as a right winger, and a current manager.

He amassed Primeira Liga totals of 151 games and nine goals over the course of 12 seasons, in representation of seven clubs including Sporting and Benfica.

Amaral won one FIFA U-20 World Cup with Portugal.

== Club career ==
Born in João Belo, Portuguese Mozambique, Amaral joined Sporting CP's youth system as a 13-year-old. In 1988 he was loaned to fellow Primeira Liga team Académico de Viseu FC, his first game in the competition occurring on 11 September in a 1−1 home draw against C.F. Os Belenenses.

In 1989–90, Amaral first appeared in the league with his main club, starting and playing 59 minutes in a 2–1 home win over F.C. Penafiel on 25 February 1990 courtesy of manager Raul Águas. However, the following season, he suffered a car crash that sidelined him for several months; when he regained full fitness he was used mainly as a substitute, his best input at the Estádio José Alvalade consisting of 13 matches in 1992–93.

In the summer of 1994, Amaral joined S.L. Benfica. He was played sparingly during his spell there, being best remembered for a disallowed goal in the second leg of the Supertaça Cândido de Oliveira against FC Porto: Vítor Baía saved a clear shot using his hands well off the penalty area, Amaral managed to insert the ball in the goal but referee Donato Ramos called for offside, in spite of no visible interference from any attacking player.

Subsequently, Amaral went on to represent in quick succession, always in the top division, FC Felgueiras (being managed by Jorge Jesus and being relegated), Belenenses, Vitória F.C. and C.D. Santa Clara. Whilst at the service of the latter side, on 14 May 2000, he scored in a 3–2 win against Vitória de Guimarães after an individual effort.

At the age of 30, Amaral moved straight into the third level, where he appeared for Atlético Clube de Portugal and S.C. Olhanense. After retiring altogether in 2005, he began working as a coach.

== International career ==
Amaral represented Portugal at the 1989 FIFA World Youth Championship, scoring the only goal in the semi-finals against Brazil to help the nation conquer the tournament. He had previously represented the under-16 at the 1986 UEFA European Under-16 Championship and the under-18 at the 1988 UEFA European Under-18 Championship, finishing runners-up in the latter. All categories comprised, he netted four times in 36 caps.
