= Abass Lawal =

Nigerian footballer

Personal information
- Full name: Abass Muyiwa Lawal
- Date of birth: 13 September 1980 (age 46)
- Place of birth: Ibadan, Nigeria
- Height: 1.67 m (5 ft 6 in)
- Position: Winger

Team information
- Current team: Shooting Stars

Youth career
- 1996–1997: Plateau United

Senior career*
Years	Team	Apps	(Gls)
1997–2000	Atlético B	42	(0)
2000–2001	Atlético Madrid	6	(0)
2001–2002	Córdoba	26	(8)
2002–2003	Leganés	36	(6)
2003–2004	Albacete	6	(0)
2005	Xerez	11	(0)
2005–2006	Moghreb Tétouan		
2006	Emirates Club		
2007	Ras Al Khaima		
2008–2009	Al Khaleej		
2009–2011	Al-Dhafra		
2014–2015	Sunshine Stars		
2015–2017	Shooting Stars		

Managerial career
- 2005–2006: Atlético Valdemoro
- * Club domestic league appearances and goals

Abass Muyiwa Lawal (born 13 September 1980) is a Nigerian footballer who played mainly as a right winger.

He spent nearly one full decade in Spain, amassing league totals of 127 games and 14 goals for six clubs (only six matches in La Liga). He also competed professionally in the United Arab Emirates.

== Football career ==
Born in Ibadan, Lawal moved to Spain at only 17 and signed with Atlético Madrid, going on to spend three full seasons with the B-team in Segunda División. In 2000–01 he was promoted to the main squad which was also competing in that category, appearing rarely (178 minutes) as the Colchoneros failed to regain their La Liga status.

After two solid seasons in the second level, with Córdoba CF and CD Leganés, Lawal returned to the top division with Albacete Balompié, but failed to establish himself in the Castile-La Mancha side and left for Xerez CD in January 2005; Albacete would also be relegated at the end of his second season.

Subsequently, Lawal played a few years in Morocco and the United Arab Emirates, where he dealt with several injury problems. In December 2013, after nearly four years of inactivity, he returned to Nigeria and joined Sunshine Stars FC.

== Personal life ==
- Lawal's middle name, Muyiwa, means "God has brought this".
- His older brother, Oladimeji, was also a footballer. A midfielder, he had professional stints in Spain and Belgium.
