= Rónald Chaves =

Costa Rican footballer (born 1970)

Personal information
- Full name: Rónald Chaves Hidalgo
- Date of birth: 6 December 1970 (age 55)
- Place of birth: Esparza, Puntarenas, Costa Rica
- Position: Midfielder

Youth career
- Escuela de Fútbol de Esparza

Senior career*
Years	Team	Apps	(Gls)
1988–1992	Municipal Puntarenas		
1994–1996	Ramonense		
1996–1997	Alajuelense		
1997–1999	Cartaginés		

International career^{‡}
1997	Costa Rica	4	(0)

Managerial career
- 2009–2010: Ramonense
- 2013: Puntarenas
- * Club domestic league appearances and goals ‡ National team caps and goals as of 1 June 2014

Rónald Chaves Hidalgo (born 6 December 1970 in Esparza, Puntarenas) is a retired Costa Rican footballer.

== Club career ==
Nicknamed el Carraco, Chaves played for Municipal Puntarenas, Ramonense, Alajuelense and Cartaginés. He won the 1996-97 Primera División de Costa Rica with Alajuelense.

== International career ==
He was a non-playing squad member at the 1989 FIFA World Youth Championship in Saudi Arabia.

Chaves made his debut for the senior Costa Rica national football team in a February 1997 friendly match against Slovakia and earned a total of 4 caps, scoring no goals. He has represented his country in 1 FIFA World Cup qualification match

== Managerial career ==
He was manager of Ramonense in 2009 but was dismisses after the 2010 Apertura. In 2013, Chaves was appointed manager of Puntarenas.
