= Charlie Raphael =

American soccer player and coach

Personal information
- Full name: Charles Raphael
- Place of birth: United States
- Position: Forward

Youth career
- 1988: George Mason University

Senior career*
Years	Team	Apps	(Gls)
1988, 1990	Washington Stars		

International career
1988	United States	1	(0)
- * Club domestic league appearances and goals

Charles Raphael (Rafael in some sources) is a former U.S. soccer forward who earned one cap with the U.S. national team in 1988. He played professionally for nine years.

== Player ==
=== Youth ===
In 1978, Raphael's U-12 youth team won the Miami Junior Orange Bowl tournament which featured 96 teams from across North America. He attended Bishop Ireton High School and attended George Mason University in 1988.

=== Professional ===
Raphael played at least the 1988 American Soccer League season with the Washington Stars. In 1990, he rejoined the Stars, who now played in the American Professional Soccer League. The team waived him on May 11, 1990.

=== National team ===
Raphael earned one cap with the U.S. national team. The game was a 1–0 win over Costa Rica on June 14, 1988. He was replaced by Steve Snow.

== Coaching ==
In 2001, he became the head coach to the Patuxent High School girls soccer team. Previously to that, he coached the Herndon High School girls team. He also coaches youth soccer with the Calvert Soccer Association.THE BLITZ
