= Oleg Tabunov =

Russian footballer

Personal information
- Full name: Oleg Vladimirovich Tabunov
- Date of birth: 18 September 1969 (age 57)
- Place of birth: Moscow, Russian SFSR
- Height: 1.75 m (5 ft 9 in)
- Position: Defender

Senior career*
Years	Team	Apps	(Gls)
1986–1987	FC Lokomotiv Moscow	18	(0)
1988	PFC CSKA Moscow	14	(0)
1989	SKA Karpaty Lvov	1	(0)
1989	PFC CSKA Moscow	0	(0)
1989	→ FC Chayka-CSKA-2 Moscow (loan)	15	(0)
1992	FC Lokomotiv Moscow	0	(0)
1992	Rovaniemen Lappi		
- * Club domestic league appearances and goals

Oleg Vladimirovich Tabunov (Russian: Олег Владимирович Табунов; born 18 September 1969) is a former Russian football player.

== International career ==
He represented Soviet Union at the 1989 FIFA World Youth Championship.
