= Nduka Ugbade =

Nigerian footballer (born 1969)

Personal information
- Date of birth: 6 September 1969 (age 57)
- Place of birth: Lagos, Lagos State, Nigeria
- Height: 1.72 m (5 ft 8 in)
- Position: Defender

Senior career*
Years	Team	Apps	(Gls)
1989	El-Kanemi Warriors		
1989–1991	Castellón	21	(2)
1991–1992	Avilés	14	(0)
1992–1993	El-Kanemi Warriors		
1994	Calabar Rovers		
1994–1997	Nigerdock Lagos		
1998–1999	Marine Castle United		
1999	Bnei Yehuda		
1999–2002	Perak		

International career
1989	Nigeria U20	1	(1)
1992–1994	Nigeria	11	(1)

Managerial career
- 2011–2013: Nigeria under-17 (assistant)
- 2013–: MFM FC
- * Club domestic league appearances and goals

Nduka Ugbade (born 6 September 1969) is a football coach and former player who is the head coach of the Nigeria U17 national team.

== Playing career ==
As a youth player, fresh from St. Finbarrs College Akoka-Lagos, Ugbade was captain of the Nigeria U-16 male soccer team that won the 1985 FIFA U-16 World Championship (later referred to as JVC/FIFA at the following edition after which it metamorphosed to its current name and status -Coca-Cola/FIFA U-17 WC). The event was held in China and brought Ugbade into prominence after Jonathan Akpoborie(5min) and Victor Igbinoba (80+min)scored unreplied goals for Nigeria against West Germany, securing what was Nigeria's and Africa's first major win in football on the global stage.

Four years later in the U-20 category, he was also part of Nigeria national under-20 football team at the 1989 FIFA World Youth Championship that placed second and won silver medals in Saudi Arabia. Nigeria lost to Portugal in the final match, but Ugbade and his teammates were the toast of the spectators after posting spectacular wins over hosts Saudi Arabia, highly favoured United States, and the USSR. Against the USSR the Nigerian team recovered from a 4–0 deficit to level 4–4 with Ugbade scoring the fourth before Nigeria won on penalties. This win is fondly referred to in Nigerian football history as the "Dammam Miracle".

After his immensely successful youth football career, Ugbade featured in the Nigerian national team for some years, but was plagued by injuries and poor form in the later years of his career which denied him of the opportunity of starring at the 1994 World Cup.

== Coaching career ==
In August 2011 he was appointed by the Nigeria Football Federation (NFF) to be one of the two assistant coaches for the Golden Eaglets (Nigeria under-17 national football team). In 2013, the team won the silver medal in the CAF U-17 tournament in Algeria, and won the 2013 FIFA U-17 World Cup in the UAE.

In 2013, Ugbade was named head coach of Lagos club MFM FC.

In 2022, the Nigeria Football Federation announced several appointments including naming Nduka Ugbade as the Head Coach of the Nigerian U-17 side also known as the Golden Eaglets
