= Oumar Guindo =

Malian footballer

Personal information
- Date of birth: 12 December 1969 (age 56)

International career
Years	Team	Apps	(Gls)
1994	Mali	4	(0)

Oumar Guindo (born 12 December 1969) is a Malian footballer. He played in four matches for the Mali national football team in 1994. He was also named in Mali's squad for the 1994 African Cup of Nations tournament.
