= Abdul Douna =

Syrian footballer (born 1971)

Personal information
- Date of birth: 13 October 1971 (age 55)
- Place of birth: Syria
- Position: Goalkeeper

Senior career*
Years	Team	Apps	(Gls)
- Al-Wathba

International career
- Syria U20
- Syria
- * Club domestic league appearances and goals

Abdul Douna (Arabic: عبد المسيح دونا; born 13 October 1971) is a Syrian former footballer who played as a goalkeeper for Al-Wathba and the Syria national team.
