= Guido Titotto =

Canadian soccer player

Personal information
- Full name: Guido Gino Titotto
- Position: Striker

Senior career*
Years	Team	Apps	(Gls)
1987–1994	Vancouver 86ers	118	(43+)
- Cliff Avenue United

International career
1986–1987	Canada U17	10	(2)
1988	Canada U20	5	(0)
1990–1991	Canada U23	7	(0)
1989	Canada	1	(0)
- * Club domestic league appearances and goals

Guido Gino Titotto is a Canadian retired soccer player who earned one cap for the Canadian national side in 1989. He played club football for Vancouver 86ers, Cliff Avenue United and Columbus FC.
