= Alberto Boggio =

Argentine footballer

Personal information
- Full name: Alberto Osvaldo Boggio
- Date of birth: 14 August 1969 (age 57)
- Position: Defender

Senior career*
Years	Team	Apps	(Gls)
1989–1993	Rosario Central	131	(4)
1993–1994	Estudiantes	23	(0)
1994–1995	Los Andes	33	(0)
1995–1997	Villa Mitre		
1998–1999	Juventud Antoniana	38	(20)
1999–2001	Villa Mitre	52	(5)
2001–2002	Tiro Federal		
2002	San Martín (Tucumán)		
Total		277	(29)

International career
1988–1989	Argentina U20	7	(0)
1992	Argentina U23	4	(0)
- * Club domestic league appearances and goals

Alberto Osvaldo Boggio (born 14 August 1969) is a former Argentine footballer who played as a defender.
