= Steve Snow =

American soccer player

Personal information
- Full name: Steven Leonard Snow
- Date of birth: March 2, 1971 (age 55)
- Place of birth: United States
- Position: Forward

College career
Years	Team	Apps	(Gls)
1989	Indiana Hoosiers		

Senior career*
Years	Team	Apps	(Gls)
1990–1992	Standard Liège	0	(0)
1992–1993	FC Boom	7	(3)
1993–1995	Chicago Power (indoor)	43	(30)

International career
1987	United States U16	3	(1)
1988–1989	United States U20	11	(7)
1988–1989	United States	2	(0)
- * Club domestic league appearances and goals

Stephen Leonard Snow (born March 2, 1971) is an American former professional soccer player who played as a forward. Snow was a dominant goal scorer at the high school, college and junior national level. He played professionally in Belgium and in the United States. He also earned two caps with the U.S. national team.

== High school and college ==
Snow was born and grew up in Illinois, and attended Hoffman Estates High School from 1985 to 1989 where he played soccer. While playing for Hoffman, Snow scored in 49 consecutive games, ranking him first on the Illinois High School Association's list of consecutive matches scored in. He finished his high school career with 92 goals.

After graduating from high school, Snow attended Indiana University, where he played NCAA soccer. As a freshman in 1989, he was the NCAA post-season tournament leading goal scorer with 4 goals and 1 assist. That year the Indiana Hoosiers lost to Santa Clara 1–0 in the semifinals.

== Professional career ==
Snow left Indiana after his freshman year to pursue a professional career in Belgium where he signed with Standard Liège. He had no first team appearances for Standard and moved to Boom following the 1992 Summer Olympics. After scoring 3 goals in his first 7 games, he suffered a major knee injury and returned to the U.S. where he had at least two surgeries to repair his anterior cruciate ligament. He never returned to play with Boom and instead signed with the Chicago Power of the National Professional Soccer League on December 10, 1993. He played thirty games, scoring twenty-seven goals, in 1994–1995, but saw time in only nine games, scoring four goals, in the 1995–1996 season before knee problems cut his playing career short. Snow retired from soccer and opened a pizza parlor on the north side of Indianapolis.

== National teams ==
=== U-16 World Championship ===
Snow gained his first taste of top level international competition with the U.S. U-16 national team as it qualified for the 1987 FIFA U-16 World Championship. At the championship, the U.S. went 1-2 and failed to qualify for the second round. Snow scored one of the U.S. goals in its 4–2 loss to South Korea.

=== U-20 World Championship ===
Snow starred for the U.S. U-20 national team in 1988 and 1989. During qualification for the 1989 U-20 World Cup, Snow scored 5 of the team's 11 goals. Then at the championship the next year, he scored 3 goals, including the goal in the team's 1–1 tie with Mali. That year, the U.S. finished fourth, losing its semifinal match to Nigeria 2–1 in overtime, despite yet another Snow goal.

=== Pan American Games ===
Snow continued his torrid scoring pace with the junior national teams at the 1991 Pan American Games, where the U.S. won its first gold medal. Snow was the team's leading scorer with 4 goals.

=== Olympics ===
Snow continued his success during qualifications for the 1992 Summer Olympics. He scored 11 goals in 9 games, including a hat trick in a 4–3 victory over Honduras, as the U.S. easily qualified for the games. However, for reasons that have never been fully explained, the U.S. coach, Lothar Osiander benched Snow for the team's opening game of the tournament against Italy. The U.S. would lose that game 2–1. Osiander was known to dislike Snow, calling him a "cocky twerp" and accusing him of being egotistical and not a team player. However, he played Snow in the next two games, a 3–1 win against Kuwait and a 2–2 tie against Poland the eventual silver medal winner. Snow scored in both games, but the U.S. failed to advance out of group play. Osiander's refusal to play Snow would lead to his being fired as Olympic coach after the games.

=== Senior team ===
Despite his success at the junior international level, Snow played only two full internationals for the U.S. national team. His first cap came in a June 14, 1988 victory over Costa Rica when he came on as a second-half substitute for Charlie Raphael. On August 13, 1989, Snow came on for Bruce Murray in a 2–1 loss to South Korea.
