= Rashid Shami Suwaid =

Qatari footballer (born 1973)

Personal information
- Date of birth: 5 September 1973 (age 53)

International career
Years	Team	Apps	(Gls)
- Qatar

Rashid Shami Suwaid (born 5 September 1973) is a Qatari footballer. He competed in the men's tournament at the 1992 Summer Olympics.
