= Terje Olsen (footballer, born 1970) =

Norwegian footballer

Personal information
- Full name: Terje Olsen
- Date of birth: 22 December 1970 (age 55)
- Place of birth: Norway
- Height: 1.83 m (6 ft 0 in)
- Position: Midfielder

Youth career
- 1986–1988: Bayer 04 Leverkusen

Senior career*
Years	Team	Apps	(Gls)
1988–1990	Bayer 04 Leverkusen	1	(0)
1991–1992	Elverum		

International career
1985–1986	Norway U15	9	(2)
1986–1987	Norway U16	11	(2)
1987	Norway U19	6	(1)
1988	Norway U18	4	(0)
1989	Norway U20	5	(0)
1989	Norway U21	4	
- * Club domestic league appearances and goals

Terje Olsen (born 22 December 1970) is a Norwegian former professional footballer who played as a midfielder. He signed for German club Bayer 04 Leverkusen at the age of 15, where he played one match for the first team. Olsen also represented Norway in the 1989 FIFA World Youth Championship, before retiring from professional football in 1992.

== Club career ==
Olsen grew up in Elverum, and travelled to Germany to play for Bayer 04 Leverkusen in 1986, where he played for the youth academy for two years. Olsen signed a professional contract with the first-team ahead of the 1988–89 season. He made his debut in the Bundesliga when he played four minutes in the match against 1. FC Nürnberg on 5 May 1989. He later signed a contract with Leverkusen's amateur team who were playing at the third tier in Germany. In 1991 Olsen returned to Norway, and played for Elverum in the First Division. After two seasons he had lost his motivation and retired.

In an interview with the Norwegian newspaper Aftenposten in 2006, he was asked if he regretted moving to Germany at the age of 15, but Olsen responded that even though he only played one match for the Bayer Leverkusen he would still do the same thing if he had the chance to go back and undo it.

== International career ==
Olsen was a part of the Norwegian "golden generation" that later qualified for the World Cup in 1994 and 1998, and he played alongside Lars Bohinen, Henning Berg and Stig Inge Bjørnebye for Norwegian youth teams. Olsen was never capped at senior level, but played 41 matches and scored five goals at youth international level between 1985 and 1989, including four matches for the under-21 team and played for Norway U20 in the 1989 FIFA World Youth Championship.

== Personal life ==
In Leverkusen, Olsen was flatmates with Stefan Schwarz, who later was capped 69 times for Sweden. He got married and got a daughter while living in Germany. He also studied while playing for Bayer Leverkusen, and has worked as a teacher after he returned to Norway.
