= Tozé (footballer, born 1969) =

Portuguese footballer

Personal information
- Full name: António José Azevedo Pereira
- Date of birth: 6 September 1969 (age 57)
- Place of birth: Matosinhos, Portugal
- Height: 1.78 m (5 ft 10 in)
- Position: Defensive midfielder

Youth career
- 1983–1987: Leixões

Senior career*
Years	Team	Apps	(Gls)
1987–1992	Leixões	120	(1)
1992–1996	Tirsense	123	(2)
1996–1998	Leça	57	(0)
1998–1999	Alverca	16	(0)
1999–2000	Maia	20	(0)
2000–2003	Leixões	41	(1)
2005–2006	Padroense		
Total		377	(4)

International career
1985–1986	Portugal U16	15	(1)
1986–1988	Portugal U18	14	(0)
1989	Portugal U20	6	(0)
1989–1991	Portugal U21	2	(0)
- * Club domestic league appearances and goals

António José Azevedo Pereira (born 6 September 1969 in Matosinhos, Porto District), known as Tozé, is a Portuguese former professional footballer who played as a defensive midfielder.

== Honours ==
Tirsense

- Segunda Liga: 1993–94

Portugal

- FIFA U-20 World Cup: 1989
