= Robeiro Moreno =

Colombian footballer (born 1969)

Robeiro Fernando Moreno Gaviria (born November 11, 1969) is a retired male football defender from Colombia. He played for the Colombia national football team at the 1992 Summer Olympics in Barcelona, Spain, wearing the #3 jersey.

== Career ==
Moreno played professional football for Once Caldas, Atlético Nacional and Atlético Bucaramanga.

After he retired from playing, Moreno became a football coach. He is the assistant manager of Categoría Primera B side Alianza Petrolera.
