= AS Commune II =

Malian football club

- Full name: Association Sportive de Commune II
- Ground: Stade Municipal de Commune II; Bamako, Mali
- Capacity: 3,000
- League: Malien Second Division

AS Commune II (Association Sportive Commune II) is a Malian football club based in Bamako. They play in the second division in Malian football in 2008, and were last in the top division in the 2007/07 season. Their home stadium is Stade Municipal de Commune II.
