= Carlos Rivera (Mexican footballer) =

Mexican footballer (born 1989)

Personal information
- Full name: Carlos Rivera Flores
- Date of birth: 11 February 1989 (age 37)
- Place of birth: Puebla, Mexico
- Height: 1.69 m (5 ft 7 in)
- Position: Attacking midfielder

Youth career
- 2007–2008: Lobos BUAP

Senior career*
| Years | Team | Apps | (Gls) |
| 2008 | Lobos BUAP | 5 | (0) |
| 2009–2010 | Puebla | 0 | (0) |
| 2011 | Tampico Madero | | |
- * Club domestic league appearances and goals

Carlos Rivera Flores (born February 11, 1989) is a Mexican former footballer.

== Career ==
Carlos Rivera Flores began his career playing in the Lobos BUAP youth system in 2007 where he played until 2009 when he was sold to cross town top division club Puebla FC. He took part of the under 20 reserved squad for Puebla FC where he showed his skills and so was promoted to the top club to take part of the 2010 Apartura tournaments.
