= Øystein Drillestad =

Norwegian footballer (born 1970)

Personal information
- Date of birth: 22 January 1970 (age 56)
- Positions: Midfielder; forward

Youth career
- –1983: Råde
- 1984–1987: Moss

Senior career*
Years	Team	Apps	(Gls)
1988–1989	Råde		
1990	Moss	6	(0)
1991	Råde		
1991–1994	USF Bulls		
1992	→ Råde (loan)		
1995–1999	Sarpsborg		
2000	Sparta		
2001–2002	Sarpsborg		
- Tune

International career
1988	Norway U18	1	(0)
1989	Norway U20	4	(1)
1989	Norway U21	1	(0)

Managerial career
- 1995: Sarpsborg (player-assistant)
- 2000: Sparta (player-manager)
- * Club domestic league appearances and goals

Øystein Drillestad (born 22 January 1970) is a retired Norwegian footballer who played as a midfielder or forward. He is best known for playing on the first tier with Moss FK, on the second tier with Råde IL and Sarpsborg FK, and representing Norway at the 1989 FIFA World Youth Championship.

== Career ==
Hailing from Karlshus, he started his career in Råde IL, before playing youth football for Moss FK from age 14 to 1987. He then started his senior career in Råde and participated in their successful run in the 1988 Norwegian Football Cup. As Råde eliminated Lillestrøm from the cup, Drillestad scored one goal and was mentioned by VG as Råde's most talented player. Drillestad was highlighted as one of Råde's standout players, as the team chased promotion to the second tier, His main strengths as a player were passing and ball distribution. in which they ultimately succeeded.

He was selected for a Norway U16 training camp in 1986, but did not make his international debut until 1988. Norway U20 had qualified for the 1989 FIFA World Youth Championship. In early 1989, the team had a training camp in Cyprus followed by internationals in Portugal, before the championship in February. He was still new to the international scene when playing against Portugal and Spain, but he was selected for the squad. Drillestad scored Norway's first goal in the tournament, the 1–0 goal in a 4–2 victory over Spain U20. Nonetheless, Norway was eliminated from the tournament.

As Drillestad entered the compulsory military service in the fall of 1989, he also negotiated a transfer to First Division team Moss FK ahead of the 1990 season. He would make his first-tier debut in June 1990, but was not a team regular, and both Råde and Fredrikstad FK made inquiries about the player's availability. Moss rejected a transfer in 1990, but in 1991 he was back in Råde.

In the summer of 1991 Drillestad left Norway to attend the University of South Florida and play college soccer for the USF Bulls. The star of the team was Mark Chung. Drillestad and his Norwegian teammates characterized American college soccer as a bit more technical and far less tactical than the Norwegian game. After Mark Chung left, head coach Jay Miller called Drillestad the most important player on the team.

During the college off-season, the summer of 1992, he played for Råde on loan. In the summer of 1993, he was wanted by Ski IL, but was somewhat injured.

After 3.5 years at the University of South Florida, Drillestad graduated in business administration. Returning to Norway in January 1995, he visited Kongsvinger IL, but they did not have room for another player in their budget, and he trained with second-tier club Sarpsborg FK. He was considering the MLS Tryout in October 1995, for the new league that would commence in 1996, being especially interested in joining the Tampa-based team. In the meantime, Drillestad did sign for Sarpsborg FK, both as a player and joint head coach.

Drillestad was on the wishlist of Råde both after the 1995 season and after the 1996 season, but on both occasions he stayed in Sarpsborg.

In 2000 he was named as playing assistant manager of IL Sparta, under head coach Kai Andersen and alongside Jan Kristian Fjærestad. He then returned to SFK after the 2000 season, retiring in 2002.

== Personal life ==
He is a nephew of football manager Bjørn Drillestad. He married in 2000 and resided in Sarpsborg.

When Sarpsborg 08 FF was formed in 2008, then under the name Sarpsborg Sparta FK, Drillestad was nominated for the board of directors. He also held positions in minnows Tune IL.
