= Terje Olsen (footballer, born 1965) =

Norwegian footballer

Personal information
- Date of birth: 04.04.1965
- Place of birth: Oslo (Norway)
- Date of death: 10.09.2018
- Place of death: Oslo
- Position: Defender

Senior career*
Years	Team	Apps	(Gls)
–1986	Oppsal		
1987–1989	Skeid		
1990–1992	Strømmen		
1993–1995	Vålerenga		
- * Club domestic league appearances and goals

Terje Olsen (born 04.04.1965) (died 10.09.2018) was a former Norwegian football defender.

He joined Skeid from Oppsal in 1987, then Strømmen in 1990. In 1993 he went on to Vålerenga along with Espen Haug. He featured in 8 league games in 1995, then retired.
