= Philip Osondu =

Nigerian footballer (1971–2019)

Personal information
- Full name: Philip Osondu Mast
- Date of birth: 28 November 1971
- Place of birth: Aba, Abia, Nigeria
- Date of death: 12 December 2019 (aged 48)
- Place of death: Namur, Belgium
- Position: Forward

Youth career
- 1988–1989: El Kanemi Warriors; RSC Anderlecht

Senior career*
Years	Team	Apps	(Gls)
1989–1996	RSC Anderlecht	1	(0)
1990–1992	RWDM	41	(7)
1994–1995	La Louvière	20	(5)
1996	Union Saint Gillis	13	(1)
1999–2002	Diegem Sport	43	(2)
2003–2004	FC Merchtem 2000		
- * Club domestic league appearances and goals

Philip Osondu Mast (28 November 1971 – 12 December 2019) was a Nigerian footballer. He played in Belgium for teams including RSC Anderlecht and RWDM.

== Career ==
Philip Osondu played in his native Nigeria for El Kanemi Warriors when RSC Anderlecht bought him to Belgium in 1988. The attacker was seen as an emerging football talent and was transferred to Anderlecht that was a promising team. A year later, the 18-year-old striker made his debut at the highest level in an away match against Germinal Ekeren in 1989 playing under coach Aad de Mos. However, there was a lot of competition at Anderlecht with players like Luc Nilis, Luis Oliveira, Marc Van Der Linden and Gert Verheyen which made Osondu appear barely at the games. Between 1990 and 1992 the Nigerian was also loaned to neighbors RWDM.

When RWDM got Osondu, coach Hugo Broos gave him more playing opportunities. For the first time in the First Division, he also found the back of the goal. Osondu scored his first goal in a 4–1 win over Beerschot VAC. A year later Broos left for Club Brugge and was succeeded by Ladislav Novák. This led to fewer opportunities to play for Osondu, which in the summer led to his return to Anderlecht.

In 1994 Osondu moved to second division club La Louvière, where the small and technically gifted striker scored five times in twenty matches. A season later he swapped La Louvière during the winter break for Union Saint Gillis, where he completed the rest of the season. Afterwards he played several years for Diegem Sport and FC Merchtem 2000.

Osondu, who was regarded in his own country as a great talent and also received high praise as a youth international, could never fulfill his potential in Belgium. He is often cited as one of many young Africans who went too early to go abroad.

== Youth International ==
Philip Osondu played regularly for the youth teams of Nigeria, but never reached the first team. In 1987 he participated in the World U-16 tournament in Canada. Nigeria reached the final, but then lost on penalties to the Soviet Union. Osondu got the World Cup Golden Ball as best player of the tournament. In 1989 he was in the Nigeria national under-20 football team at the World Youth Championship that placed second and won silver medals in Saudi Arabia, Nigeria lost to Portugal in the final match.

== Death ==
Philip was working in Namur and felt unwell and was then picked up by an ambulance, and taken to a hospital, but died shortly thereafter.
