= Felipe Herrero =

Spanish footballer

Personal information
- Full name: Felipe Herrero Baeza
- Date of birth: 18 June 1970 (age 56)
- Place of birth: Madrid, Spain
- Height: 1.80 m (5 ft 11 in)
- Position: Defender

Senior career*
Years	Team	Apps	(Gls)
1988–1993	Real Madrid Castilla	78	(6)
1991–1992	→ Castellón (loan)	3	(0)
1993–1994	Córdoba	33	(1)
1994–1996	Logroñés	44	(0)
1996–1998	Toledo	54	(0)
1998–1999	Ourense	12	(0)
1999–2000	Manchego	19	(0)
2000–2002	Alcorcón	44	(0)
Total		287	(7)

International career
1985–1986	Spain U16	10	(0)
1987–1988	Spain U18	8	(1)
1988–1989	Spain U19	3	(0)
1989–1990	Spain U20	5	(1)
1989	Spain U21	2	(0)
- * Club domestic league appearances and goals

Felipe Herrero Baeza (born 18 June 1970), is a retired Spanish footballer who played as a defender.

== Career statistics ==
=== Club ===
Club	Season	League			Cup		Other		Total	
Club	Season	Division	Apps	Goals	Apps	Goals	Apps	Goals	Apps	Goals
Castilla	1988–89	Segunda División	35	4	0	0	0	0	35	4
Castilla	1989–90	Segunda División	32	2	0	0	0	0	32	2
Real Madrid Deportivo	1990–91	Segunda División B	1	0	0	0	0	0	1	0
Real Madrid Deportivo	1991–92	Segunda División	10	0	0	0	0	0	10	0
Real Madrid Deportivo	Total		78	6	0	0	0	0	78	6
Castellón (loan)	1991–92	Segunda División	3	0	0	0	0	0	3	0
Córdoba	1993–94	Segunda División B	33	0	6 (Note: Appearances in the King's Cup)	1	0	0	39	1
Logroñés	1994–95	La Liga	21	0	0	0	0	0	21	0
Logroñés	1995–96	Segunda División	23	0	3	0	0	0	26	0
Logroñés	Total		44	0	3	0	0	0	47	0
Toledo	1996–97	Segunda División	28	0	3	0	0	0	31	0
Toledo	1997–98	Segunda División	26	0	1	0	0	0	27	0
Toledo	Total		54	0	4	0	0	0	58	0
Ourense	1998–99	Segunda División	12	0	1	0	0	0	13	0
Manchego	1999–00	Segunda División B	19	0	0	0	0	0	19	0
Toledo	2000–01	Segunda División B	19	0	0	0	0	0	19	0
Toledo	2001–02	Segunda División B	25	0	0	0	2 (Note: Appearances in the Segunda División B play-offs)	0	27	0
Toledo	Total		44	0	0	0	2	0	46	0
Career total			287	7	14	1	2	0	303	8
