= Roar Hagen (footballer) =

Norwegian footballer (born 1971)

Personal information
- Date of birth: 9 August 1971 (age 55)
- Position: Goalkeeper

Youth career
- Tistedalen
- Fredrikstad

Senior career*
Years	Team	Apps	(Gls)
–1990	Fredrikstad		
1990	Brann		
1991	Fredrikstad		
1991	→ Kvik Halden (loan)		
1992–1993	Sogndal		
1994–?	Tistedalen		
- * Club domestic league appearances and goals

Roar Hagen (born August 9, 1971) is a retired Norwegian football goalkeeper.

He started his career in Tistedalens TIF, but went on to larger club Fredrikstad FK. He was the youngest squad member for Norway in the 1989 FIFA World Youth Championship.

After the 1990 season he was bought by SK Brann, but after a few months he returned to Fredrikstad. However, Fredrikstad had already secured a replacement for Hagen, and so Hagen was loaned out to Kvik Halden FK. Already in April 1991 he returned to Fredrikstad, but in July 1991 he left again. Before the 1992 season he joined Sogndal IL, and played in the Norwegian Premier League, but the team was relegated. After the 1993 season he was replaced with Andre Ulla, and returned to Tistedalen. He then faded into football obscurity.
