= Oleh Benko =

Ukrainian footballer

Personal information
- Full name: Oleh Ivanovych Benko
- Date of birth: 21 October 1969 (age 57)
- Place of birth: Leningrad, Soviet Union (now Saint Petersburg, Russia)
- Height: 1.78 m (5 ft 10 in)
- Position: Left-back

Youth career
- 1978–1983: DYuSSh Stryi
- 1983–1985: OShISP Lviv

Senior career*
Years	Team	Apps	(Gls)
1985	Zakarpattia Uzhhorod	3	(0)
1986–1987	Torpedo Lutsk	24	(0)
1988–1989	SKA-Karpaty Lviv	37	(0)
1990–1991	Dnipro Dnipropetrovsk	24	(0)
1992	Karpaty Lviv	26	(2)
1993–1994	Volyn Lutsk	46	(2)
1995–1996	Bukovyna Chernivtsi	69	(10)
1997	Metalurh Zaporizhzhia	3	(0)
1998	Polissya Zhytomyr	7	(0)

International career
1986	Soviet Union U16		
1988	Soviet Union U18		
1989	Soviet Union U20		
1990–1991	Soviet Union U21	2	(0)
Medal record
Men's football
Representing Soviet Union
UEFA European U-19 Championships
Winner	1988 Czechoslovakia
UEFA European U-16 Championships
Bronze medal – third place	1986 Greece
- * Club domestic league appearances and goals as of 30 June 2022

Oleh Ivanovych Benko (Ukrainian: Олег Іванович Бенько; born 21 October 1969) is a Ukrainian retired professional footballer who played as a left-back.

== Club career ==
=== Karpaty Lviv ===
On 6 March 1992 Benko played in the first ever match of the Vyshcha Liha (now called Ukrainian Premier League) for Karpaty Lviv against Chornomorets Odesa.

== Honours ==
Karpaty Lviv

- Ukrainian Cup runner-up: 1992–93

Bukovyna Chernivtsi

- Ukrainian First League runner-up: 1995–96
