= Ari Bozão =

Brazilian footballer and coach (born 1969)

Ari Bazão
Personal information
- Full name: Ariovaldo Guilherme
- Date of birth: 2 August 1969 (age 57)
- Place of birth: Jaú, São Paulo, Brazil
- Height: 1.85 m (6 ft 1 in)
- Position: Defender

Senior career*
Years	Team	Apps	(Gls)
1988–1990	Corinthians	4	(0)
1992–1993	Guarda	30	(8)
1993–1994	Amora	24	(8)
1994–1995	Guarda	29	(3)
1995–1996	Covilhã	34	(6)
1998–1999	Asazgua		
1999–2005	Deportivo Carchá		
2005–2006	Aurora		
2006–2008	Deportivo Carchá		
2009–2010	Cobán Imperial		
Total		121	(25)

International career
1989	Brazil U20	2	(0)

Managerial career
- 2013: Jalapa
- * Club domestic league appearances and goals

Ariovaldo Guilherme (born 2 August 1969), commonly known as Ari Bozão, is a former Brazilian footballer.

== Career statistics ==
Club	Season	League			State League		Cup		Continental		Other		Total	
Club	Season	Division	Apps	Goals	Apps	Goals	Apps	Goals	Apps	Goals	Apps	Goals	Apps	Goals
Corinthians	1988	Série A	2	0	0	0	0	0	0	0	0	0	2	0
Corinthians	1989	Série A	2	0	0	0	0	0	0	0	0	0	2	0
Corinthians	Total		4	0	0	0	0	0	0	0	0	0	4	0
Guarda	1992–93	Segunda Divisão	30	8	–		2 (Note: Appearances in the Taça de Portugal)	1	–		0	0	32	9
Amora	1993–94	Segunda Divisão	24	8	–		2	0	–		0	0	26	8
Guarda	1994–95	Segunda Divisão	29	3	–		1	0	–		0	0	30	3
Covilhã	1995–96	Segunda Divisão	34	6	–		2	0	–		0	0	36	6
Career total			121	25	0	0	7	1	0	0	0	0	128	26
