= Oladimeji Lawal =

Nigerian footballer and agent

Personal information
- Full name: Mohammed Oladimeji Lawal
- Date of birth: 24 July 1971 (age 55)
- Place of birth: Ifo, Nigeria
- Height: 1.74 m (5 ft 8 1/2 in)
- Position: Midfielder

Senior career*
Years	Team	Apps	(Gls)
1988–1989	Julius Berger		
1989–1991	Madrid B	24	(0)
1991–1993	Shooting Stars		
1993–1994	Kortrijk	3	(0)
1994	Hellenic		

International career
1990	Nigeria	3	(1)
- * Club domestic league appearances and goals

Mohammed Oladimeji Lawal (born 24 July 1971) is a former Nigerian footballer who played as a midfielder for clubs in Nigeria, Spain and Belgium. He is a FIFA-licensed players' agent.

== Club career ==
Lawal moved started his footballing career with Femo Scorpion Football club of Eruwa alongside the likes of Mutiu Adepoju and moved to Spain at age 18 and signed with Real Madrid, and would spend two seasons with the B team, one in the Segunda División and one in Segunda División B. He was never promoted to the main squad, and returned to Nigeria to play for Shooting Stars F.C.

In 1993, Lawal joined Belgian Second Division side K.V. Kortrijk for one season. He played in the South African Premier Soccer League with Hellenic FC during 1994.

== International career ==
Lawal played for Nigeria in the 1987 FIFA U-16 World Championship in Canada and the 1989 FIFA World Youth Championship in Saudi Arabia.

Lawal made several appearances for the senior Nigeria national football team. He scored on his debut, a 1992 African Nations Cup qualifier against Togo in 1990.

== Personal ==
His younger brother, Abass Muyiwa, is also a footballer. A midfielder, he has had professional stints in Spain, Morocco and the United Arab Emirates.
