= Alejandro Ruidiaz =

Argentine footballer (1969–2006)

Personal information
- Date of birth: 3 September 1969
- Place of birth: Avellaneda, Argentina
- Date of death: 26 March 2006 (aged 36)
- Position: Midfielder

Senior career*
Years	Team	Apps	(Gls)
1984–1985	Independiente B		
1986–1991	Independiente		
1989	Toshiba S.C.		
1990–1991	Independiente		

International career
- Argentina
- * Club domestic league appearances and goals

Alejandro Ruidiaz (3 September 1969 – 26 March 2006) was an Argentine professional footballer who played as a midfielder. He competed at the men's tournament at the 1988 Summer Olympics.

== Career ==
Ruidiaz played at the 1985 FIFA U-16 World Championship and made his debut with Club Atlético Independiente's first team at the age of 17. He was part of the Argentina national team which participated at the 1988 Summer Olympics. In 1989, he competed at the 1989 FIFA U-16 World Championship and joined Japanese side Toshiba S.C. Having returned to Independiente in 1990 he was severely injured in a car crash. He played his last match for the club in December 1991 before being released.

In September 1992, he was close to a move to River Plate but during examinations related to a knee injury he was diagnosed with a heart problem that forced him to retire from playing aged 23.
