= Samuel Elijah =

Nigerian footballer

Personal information
- Full name: Samuel Elijah
- Date of birth: 14 November 1969 (age 56)
- Place of birth: Bauchi State, Nigeria
- Height: 1.73 m (5 ft 8 in)
- Position: Midfielder

Youth career
- Kaduna Textile Limited
- Lead Way Insurance

Senior career*
Years	Team	Apps	(Gls)
1986–1992	Utility Bombers	72	(6)

International career
1989	Nigeria U20	3	(1)
1990	Nigeria	1	(0)

Managerial career
- 2005: Kwara State All Stars
- 2005–2006: Crown F.C.
- 2007–: Kwara State Football Academy
- * Club domestic league appearances and goals

Samuel Elijah (born 14 November 1969), popularly known as Samuel "Prophet" Elijah is a retired Nigerian footballer who played as a midfielder. He was a member of the Nigeria U-20 team that competed at the 1989 FIFA World Youth Championship.

== Early life and career ==
Born in Bauchi State Nigeria, Elijah was on boys football teams before he became a footballer during 1985.

In 1989, he was part of the Nigeria U-20 team that placed second at the 1989 FIFA World Youth Championship. He went on to gain his first cap as a senior player in a match against Togo.

After numerous injury problems, Samuel went into coaching course in 2004, and officially started coaching Kwara State All Stars. In 2005, Samuel joined Crown FC Ogbomoso and coached them in 2005 and 2006. After 2006, he went to Lagos and coached the Nigeria Port Authority (NPA) in 2007. That was when he met Clemens Westerhof in Ilorin. When his contract expired, Elijah went back to Ilorin to work with Clemens Westerhof at the Kwara Football Academy.
