= 1988 UEFA European Under-18 Championship =

Tournament details
- Host country: Czechoslovakia
- Dates: 22–27 July
- Teams: 8

Final positions
- Champions: Soviet Union (5th title)
- Runners-up: Portugal
- Third place: East Germany
- Fourth place: Spain

Tournament statistics
- Matches played: 10
- Goals scored: 26 (2.6 per match)

The UEFA European Under-18 Championship 1988 Final Tournament was held in Czechoslovakia. It also served as the European qualification for the 1989 FIFA World Youth Championship.

== Teams ==
The following teams qualified for the tournament:

- Czechoslovakia (host, but still qualified)
- Denmark
- East Germany
- Netherlands
- Norway
- Portugal
- Soviet Union
- Spain

== Quarterfinals ==
22 July 1988

East Germany	2 – 0	Denmark
Lars Hermel 15'; Uwe Jähnig 38'

Frýdek-Místek
Referee: Joaquin Ramos Marcos (Spain)

22 July 1988

Spain	1 – 0	Czechoslovakia

Opava
Referee: Peter Mikkelsen (Denmark)

22 July 1988

Soviet Union	4 – 2	Norway

Vsetín
Referee: Ignace van Swieten (Netherlands)

22 July 1988

Portugal	3 – 0	Netherlands
João Pinto 26'; Valido 41'; Folha 74'

Kopřivnice
Referee: Alexey Spirin (CIS)

== Semifinals ==
=== Places 5-8 ===
24 July 1988

Norway	1 – 1	Denmark
Penalties
	5 – 4

Vsetín
Referee: Zdeněk Havlíček (Czechoslovakia)

24 July 1988

Czechoslovakia	1 – 0	Netherlands

Kopřivnice
Referee: Klaus Peschel (East Germany)

=== Places 1-4 ===
24 July 1988

Spain	0 – 2	Portugal
		Valido 46' (g.p.); João Pinto 52'

Opava
Referee: Thorodd Presberg (Norway)

24 July 1988

Soviet Union	3 – 0	East Germany

Frýdek-Místek
Referee: Jose Guedes (Portugal)

== Third place match ==
27 July 1988

East Germany	2 – 0	Spain
Henri Fuchs 56', 73'

Frýdek-Místek
Referee: Hubert Forstinger (Austria)

== Final ==
27 July 1988

Soviet Union	3 – 1 (aet)	Portugal
Andrei Timoshenko 78'; Yuri Nikiforov 102'; Oleg Salenko 117'		João Pinto 55'

Frýdek-Místek
Referee: Andrzej Libich (Poland)

== Qualification to World Youth Championship ==
The six best performing teams qualified for the 1989 FIFA World Youth Championship.

- Czechoslovakia
- East Germany
- Norway
- Portugal
- Soviet Union
- Spain

== See also ==
- 1988 UEFA European Under-18 Championship qualifying
