= Wilson Muñoz =

Costa Rican footballer (born 1975)

Personal information
- Full name: Wilson Muñoz Brenes
- Date of birth: 5 February 1975 (age 51)
- Place of birth: Puntarenas, Costa Rica
- Height: 1.79 m (5 ft 10 in)
- Position: Midfielder

Youth career
- Alajuelense

Senior career*
Years	Team	Apps	(Gls)
- Alajuelense
- Turrialba
–2000	Alajuelense		
2000–2002	OFI	48	(5)
- Saprissa
- Municipal Liberia
- * Club domestic league appearances and goals

Wilson Muñoz Brenes (born 5 February 1975) is a Costa Rican former professional footballer who played as a midfielder.

== Career ==
Muñoz started his career with Costa Rican side Alajuelense, forming a midfield partnership with Costa Rica international Wílmer López.

In 2000, he signed for OFI in Greece.

In 2002, Muñoz signed for Saprissa, Costa Rica's most successful club, where he was known for being asked by a model to sign her buttocks.
