= Humberto Biazotti =

Argentine footballer (born 1970)

Personal information
- Full name: Humberto Fabián Biazotti
- Date of birth: February 10, 1970 (age 55)
- Place of birth: Pergamino, Buenos Aires, Argentina
- Height: 1.75 m (5 ft 9 in)
- Position(s): Forward

Senior career*
Years	Team	Apps	(Gls)
1989–1995	Ferro Carril Oeste	146	(23)
1995–1996	Rosario Central	22	(0)
1996	Estudiantes LP	12	(1)
1997	Aurora		
1997	Deportes Antofagasta	10	(0)
1998	Budon		
1999–2000	San Miguel	30	(6)
2000–2001	All Boys	13	(1)
2001–2002	San Martín Tucumán		
2002–2003	Atlético Tucumán	20	(7)
2004	Sportivo Italiano	4	(0)
2004	Estudiantes SL		

Managerial career
- 2021: Douglas Haig
- *Club domestic league appearances and goals

Humberto Fabián Biazotti (born February 10, 1970, in Pergamino) is an Argentine former footballer who played for clubs from Argentina, Chile, Bolivia, and China. He played as a forward.

== Teams (Player) ==
- (Argentina) Ferro Carril Oeste 1989–1995
- (Argentina) Rosario Central 1995–1996
- (Argentina) Estudiantes de La Plata 1996
- (Bolivia) Aurora 1997
- (Chile) Deportes Antofagasta 1997
- (China) Budon 1998
- (Argentina) San Miguel 1999–2000
- (Argentina) All Boys 2000–2001
- (Argentina) San Martín de Tucumán 2001–2002
- (Argentina) Atlético Tucumán 2002–2003
- (Argentina) Sportivo Italiano 2004
- (Argentina) Estudiantes de San Luis 2004

== Teams (Manager) ==
- (Argentina) Douglas Haig 2021
