= Råde IL =

Norwegian sports club

- Full name: Råde Idrettslag
- Founded: 29 March 1929; 96 years ago
- Ground: Råde idrettspark, Råde
Home colours

Råde Idrettslag is a Norwegian sports club from Råde, Østfold. It has sections for association football, race walking, team handball, floorball, tennis, volleyball, speed skating and skiing.

== History ==
The club was founded on 29 March 1929 as Råde SK. It changed its name to Råde IL on 1 March 1946. It formerly had sections for badminton, basketball, gymnastics, track and field and orienteering.

The men's football team currently plays in the Fifth Division, the sixth tier of Norwegian football. It last played in the Norwegian Second Division in 1999. Former players include Øystein Drillestad, Leif Andersen, Bjørnar Johannessen, Jon André Fredriksen and Vidar Martinsen. Kai Erik Herlovsen has coached the team.

Råde made a short cup run in 2024 when they reached the third round, being the only club remaining not in Norway's highest three divisions. They defeated second-division side Moss in the second round before falling to Sarpsborg.
