= Arne Bonde (footballer) =

Norwegian footballer (born 1961)

Personal information
- Date of birth: 3 February 1961 (age 65)
- Position: Goalkeeper

Youth career
- Røros

Senior career*
Years	Team	Apps	(Gls)
1977–1984	Røros		
1985–1986	Nidelv/Falken		
1987–1989	Røros		
1990–1993	Strindheim		
1993	→ Rosenborg (loan)	0	(0)
1993	→ Stjørdals-Blink (loan)		
1994	Stjørdals-Blink	9	(0)
1995	Strindheim	12	(0)
- * Club domestic league appearances and goals

Arne Bonde (born 3 February 1961) is a Norwegian retired professional footballer. Best known for two stints in Strindheim IL, he played for the team in the Eliteserien in 1995.

== Røros and Nidelv ==
Arne Bonde started his career in Røros IL, playing for their first team from the age of 16. He moved to Trondheim to play for the cooperation team of Nidelv and Falken in 1985. In 1987, he moved back to Røros for a second stint. During the 1987 season, Bonde barely conceded any goals. captaining Røros in the fourth tier, the opponents only scored 3 times in the first 19 games (of a 22-game round-robin). The team won promotion to the third tier. After the full 22 games, Bonde had conceded 5, and Røros was approached by Kongsvinger IL and Faaberg regarding a transfer. In 1988, Røros would employ a more attacking style under a new manager, whereas their former playing style was described by regional press as "plainly and simply boring". The spring part of 1988 was a continuation, only yielding 6 goals against Bonde, but in the late summer he suddenly conceded 20 goals in 4 games. After the 1988 season, Kongsvinger IL approached Bonde again, having been snubbed for Thor André Olsen.

== Strindheim ==
Røros were relegated in 1989, and Bonde joined Strindheim IL in 1990. The transfer fee had to be litigated by the Football Association. In the Easter of 1990, the team arranged a training camp in Switzerland. Travelling to Frederikshavn by ship, their vessel was among the responders to the MS Scandinavian Star fire, which Arne Bonde and the other Strindheim players then witnessed.

After the 1992 season, Bonde was planning to retire. He would continue in Strindheim by serving as goalkeeper coach in 1993, under manager Arve Aspaas and assistant Sverre Brandhaug. In this capacity, Bonde would coach Jørn Jamtfall, who took over as Strindheim's number one.

== Opportunity in Eliteserien ==
However, Rosenborg BK's Norway international goalkeeper Ola By Rise was injured, prompting Nils Arne Eggen to call Bonde and give him the chance to train with Norway's reigning champions. Rosenborg ended up signing Bonde, technically as a loan from Strindheim. Bonde's ambition in Rosenborg was to play during the injury layoff of By Rise, competing with Rosenborg's current second-choice goalkeeper Ivar Selnæs. Bonde would be bought out from his job at Forenede Forsikring in order to train during the day.

Bonde played for Rosenborg in a friendly match in January 1993, but was sent off, forcing Gøran Sørloth to don the goalkeeper equipment. It later emerged that Bonde should have been suspended, but a formal red card was not given and a referee report not sent after the incident. As it became clear that Bonde would not outcompete Ivar Selnæs, Strindheim and Rosenborg were contacted by Stjørdals-Blink who were missing a goalkeeper ahead of the 1993 league opener. Coach Otto Ulseth stated that Blink precariously needed a goalkeeper "with self-confidence and authority. Arne Bonde has that". Rosenborg decided to let Bonde move on loan to Stjørdals-Blink, a move which was made permanent in 1994.

The 1994 1. divisjon season ended abruptly for Bonde as he broke his arm in a match against Drøbak-Frogn. He got 9 league games in 1994. Meanwhile, his old team Strindheim won promotion to the 1995 Eliteserien, having previously played on that level only once, in 1984. Strindheim now wanted to sign Bonde for a second period in the club. He was confirmed in October 1994 as joining Strindheim for the upcoming season.

There was a minor dispute regarding the transfer fee, where Bonde claimed that his contract stipulated a maximum buyout fee of 25,000 kr. The Football Association sided with Bonde, who emphasized: "Had the fee become higher, I would have retired this very day". In March 1995, Bonde played his first full match after the fracture injury that sidelined him in July 1994. Strindheim rejected a Russian trialist goalkeeper Valeri Varennikov, but still did not have a clear-cut first choice between Arne Bonde and Rune Feirud. The two would play interchangeably in what turned out to be a tough season for Strindheim. Among others, Bonde conceded five goals from Kenneth Nysæther in a 2–9 loss to Vålerenga in September. Though Bonde had never conceded 9 goals in one match since his senior career started in 1977, Adresseavisen named him Strindheim's best player during that match, with a score of 3/6. VG named him their second best player with a score of 5/10. He played 12 Eliteserien matches in total. The season ended in relegation. Bonde later became a coach.
