= Marcelo Henrique =

Brazilian footballer (born 1969)

Personal information
- Full name: Marcelo Henrique dos Santos
- Date of birth: 1 November 1969 (age 56)
- Place of birth: Rio de Janeiro, Brazil
- Height: 1.80 m (5 ft 11 in)
- Position: Forward

Senior career*
Years	Team	Apps	(Gls)
1987–1990	Fluminense	25	(5)
1990	Internacional		
1990–1993	Bangu		
1993–1995	Bragantino	8	(1)
1995	Itaperuna		
1996–1997	Ponte Preta		
1998	AA Cabofriense		
2002	Macaé		

International career
1989	Brazil U20	5	(3)
- * Club domestic league appearances and goals

Marcelo Henrique dos Santos (born 1 November 1969), commonly known as Marcelo Henrique, is a former Brazilian footballer.

== Career statistics ==
=== Club ===
Club	Season	League			State League		Cup		Continental		Other		Total	
Club	Season	Division	Apps	Goals	Apps	Goals	Apps	Goals	Apps	Goals	Apps	Goals	Apps	Goals
Fluminense	1987	Série A	4	1	0	0	0	0	0	0	0	0	4	1
Fluminense	1988	Série A	7	1	0	0	0	0	0	0	0	0	7	1
Fluminense	1989	Série A	14	3	0	0	0	0	0	0	0	0	14	3
Fluminense	Total		25	5	0	0	0	0	0	0	0	0	25	5
Bragantino	1993	Série A	2	0	0	0	0	0	0	0	0	0	2	0
Bragantino	1995	Série A	6	1	0	0	0	0	0	0	0	0	6	1
Bragantino	Total		8	1	0	0	0	0	0	0	0	0	8	1
Career total			33	6	0	0	0	0	0	0	0	0	33	6
