= Øyvind Mellemstrand =

Norwegian footballer (born 1969)

Personal information
- Full name: Øyvind Mellemstrand
- Date of birth: 17 October 1969 (age 57)
- Place of birth: Stord Municipality, Norway
- Height: 1.81 m (5 ft 11 in)
- Position: Defender

Senior career*
Years	Team	Apps	(Gls)
1990–1994	Viking	55	(4)
1997–1999	Haugesund	51	(1)
2000–2002	Stord		
Total		106	(5)

International career
1985	Norway U15	6	(1)
1986	Norway U16	4	(0)
1988	Norway U18	3	(1)
1987	Norway U19	7	(0)
1989	Norway U20	6	(2)
1988–1991	Norway U21	3	(0)
- * Club domestic league appearances and goals

Øyvind Mellemstrand (born 17 October 1969), is a Norwegian retired footballer who played as a defender.

== Club career ==
Mellemstrand played for Viking during the early 1990s, and played against Barcelona in the 1992–93 UEFA Champions League, where the Norwegian side narrowly lost 1–0 on aggregate in the first round against the defending European Champions.
