= Andrei Timoshenko =

Russian footballer and referee

Personal information
- Full name: Andrei Ivanovich Timoshenko
- Date of birth: 15 August 1969
- Place of birth: Rostov-on-Don, Russian SFSR
- Date of death: 10 September 2010 (aged 41)
- Place of death: Rostov-on-Don, Russia
- Height: 1.78 m (5 ft 10 in)
- Positions: Forward; midfielder

Senior career*
Years	Team	Apps	(Gls)
1985–1986	Rostselmash Rostov-on-Don	9	(0)
1986–1988	Dynamo Moscow	34	(1)
1989	Dinamo Minsk	15	(2)
1990	Spartak Moscow	4	(0)
1991	Malley		
1991	Dynamo Moscow	4	(0)
1992	Rostselmash Rostov-on-Don	9	(2)
1995	Rostselmash Rostov-on-Don	6	(0)
1995–1996	Volgodonsk	40	(13)
1997–1998	Volgar-Gazprom Astrakhan	57	(8)
Total		178	(26)
- * Club domestic league appearances and goals

Andrei Ivanovich Timoshenko (Russian: Андрей Иванович Тимошенко; 15 August 1969 – 10 September 2010) was a Russian professional footballer and referee.

== Club career ==
He made his debut in the Soviet Top League in 1987 for FC Dynamo Moscow.

== European club competitions ==
With FC Dynamo Moscow.

- UEFA Cup 1987–88: 3 games.
- UEFA Cup 1991–92: 4 games.

== Referee ==
From 2000 to 2006, he worked as a referee, mostly in the third-tier PFL, with a handful of games as a linesman in the second-tier FNL.
