= 1989 FIFA World Youth Championship =

1989 بطولة العالم للشباب لكرة القدم

Tournament details
- Host country: Saudi Arabia
- Dates: 16 February – 3 March
- Teams: 16 (from 5 confederations)
- Venues: 4 (in 4 host cities)

Final positions
- Champions: Portugal (1st title)
- Runners-up: Nigeria
- Third place: Brazil
- Fourth place: United States

Tournament statistics
- Matches played: 32
- Goals scored: 81 (2.53 per match)
- Attendance: 643,815 (20,119 per match)
- Top scorer: (Soviet Union) Oleg Salenko (5 goals)
- Best player: (Brazil) Bismarck
- Fair play award: United States

The 1989 FIFA World Youth Championship took place in Saudi Arabia between 16 February and 3 March 1989. The 1989 championship was the 7th contested. The tournament took place across four cities: Riyadh, Jeddah, Dammam, and Taif.

== Qualification ==
Confederation	Qualifying Tournament	Qualifier(s)
AFC (Asia)	Host nation	Saudi Arabia
AFC (Asia)	1988 AFC Youth Championship	Iraq; Syria^{1}
CAF (Africa)	1989 African Youth Championship	Mali^{1} Nigeria
CONCACAF (North, Central America & Caribbean)	1988 CONCACAF U-20 Tournament	Costa Rica^{1} United States^{2}
CONMEBOL (South America)	1988 South American U-20 Championship	Argentina; Brazil; Colombia
UEFA (Europe)	1988 UEFA European Under-18 Championship	Czechoslovakia; East Germany; Norway^{1} Portugal; Soviet Union; Spain

1.Teams that made their debut.
2.Replaced Mexico, who was disqualified from the tournament due to the Cachirules scandal.

== Venues ==
Location of the host cities of the 1989 FIFA World Youth Championship.	Riyadh	Jeddah
Location of the host cities of the 1989 FIFA World Youth Championship.	King Fahd International Stadium	Prince Abdullah Al-Faisal Stadium
Location of the host cities of the 1989 FIFA World Youth Championship.	Capacity: 70,000	Capacity: 35,000
Location of the host cities of the 1989 FIFA World Youth Championship.	Dammam	Taif
Location of the host cities of the 1989 FIFA World Youth Championship.	Prince Mohammed Bin Fahad Bin; Abdul Aziz Stadium	King Fahd Stadium
Location of the host cities of the 1989 FIFA World Youth Championship.	Capacity: 22 042	Capacity: 20,000

== Match officials ==
Africa

- (Senegal) Badara Sene
- (Mauritania) Idrissa Sarr
- (Tunisia) Neji Jouini

Asia

- (Saudi Arabia) Abdul Al Nasri
- (China) Chen Shengcai
- (Bahrain) Ahmed Mohammed Jassim

Europe

- (Austria) Hubert Forstinger
- (Italy) Tullio Lanese
- (England) Neil Midgley
- (Norway) Egil Nervik
- (West Germany) Aron Schmidhuber
- (Northern Ireland) Alan Snoddy
- (Soviet Union) Alexey Spirin
- (Belgium) Marcel van Langenhove

North, Central America and Caribbean

- (United States) Arturo Angeles
- (Mexico) Arturo Brizio Carter
- (El Salvador) José Carlos Ortíz

South America

- (Argentina) Juan Antonio Bava
- (Ecuador) Elias Jácome
- (Brazil) José Roberto Wright
- (Colombia) José Torres Cadena

== Squads ==
For a list of all squads that played in the final tournament, see 1989 FIFA World Youth Championship squads

== Group stage ==
The 16 teams were split into four groups of four teams. Four group winners, and four second-place finishers qualify for the knockout round.

=== Group A ===
Pos	Team	Pld	W	D	L	GF	GA	GD	Pts	Group stage result
1	Portugal	3	2	0	1	2	3	−1	4	Advance to knockout stage
2	Nigeria	3	1	1	1	3	3	0	3	Advance to knockout stage
3	Czechoslovakia	3	1	1	1	2	2	0	3	
4	Saudi Arabia (H)	3	1	0	2	4	3	+1	2	

(H) Hosts
16 February 1989
18:00

Saudi Arabia	1–2	Nigeria
Al Suraiti 16'	(Report)	Adepoju 52'; Ohenhen 87'

King Fahd International Stadium, Riyadh
Attendance: 70,000
Referee: Marcel van Langenhove (Belgium)

17 February 1989
18:00

Czechoslovakia	0–1	Portugal
	(Report)	Alves 88'

King Fahd International Stadium, Riyadh
Attendance: 7,000
Referee: José Roberto Wright (Brazil)

19 February 1989
18:00

Saudi Arabia	0–1	Czechoslovakia
	(Report)	Látal 52'

King Fahd International Stadium, Riyadh
Attendance: 20,000
Referee: Alan Snoddy (Northern Ireland)

20 February 1989
18:00

Nigeria	0–1	Portugal
	(Report)	João Pinto 79'

King Fahd International Stadium, Riyadh
Attendance: 7,000
Referee: Egil Nervik (Norway)

22 February 1989
15:45

Saudi Arabia	3–0	Portugal
Al Harbi 52'; Al Rowaihi 56'; Al Debaikhi 83'	(Report)

King Fahd International Stadium, Riyadh
Attendance: 8,000
Referee: José Roberto Wright (Brazil)

22 February 1989
18:00

Nigeria	1–1	Czechoslovakia
Nwosu 72'	(Report)	Látal 14'

King Fahd International Stadium, Riyadh
Attendance: 8,000
Referee: Arturo Brizio Carter (Mexico)

=== Group B ===
Pos	Team	Pld	W	D	L	GF	GA	GD	Pts	Group stage result
1	Soviet Union	3	3	0	0	7	2	+5	6	Advance to knockout stage
2	Colombia	3	1	0	2	3	4	−1	2	Advance to knockout stage
3	Syria	3	1	0	2	4	6	−2	2	
4	Costa Rica	3	1	0	2	2	4	−2	2	

17 February 1989
15:45

Costa Rica	1–0	Colombia
González 88'	(Report)

Prince Mohammed Bin Fahad Bin Abdul Aziz Stadium, Dammam
Attendance: 11,000
Referee: Al Nasir (Saudi Arabia)

17 February 1989
18:00

Soviet Union	3–1	Syria
Tedeev 29'; Salenko 49', 83'	(Report)	Sibai 65'

Prince Mohammed Bin Fahad Bin Abdul Aziz Stadium, Dammam
Attendance: 11,000
Referee: Juan Antonio Bava (Argentina)

19 February 1989
18:00

Costa Rica	0–1	Soviet Union
	(Report)	Matveev 84'

Prince Mohammed Bin Fahad Bin Abdul Aziz Stadium, Dammam
Attendance: 5,000
Referee: Aron Schmidhuber (West Germany)

20 February 1989
18:00

Colombia	2–0	Syria
Muñoz 42'; Osorio 85'	(Report)

Prince Mohammed Bin Fahad Bin Abdul Aziz Stadium, Dammam
Attendance: 9,545
Referee: Kenneth Wallace (New Zealand)

22 February 1989
15:45

Costa Rica	1–3	Syria
Brenes 80'	(Report)	Helou 16', 45'; Afash 30'

Prince Mohammed Bin Fahad Bin Abdul Aziz Stadium, Dammam
Attendance: 6,000
Referee: Badara Sene (Senegal)

22 February 1989
18:00

Colombia	1–3	Soviet Union
Muñoz 5'	(Report)	Timoshenko 25'; Salenko 29', 32'

Prince Mohammed Bin Fahad Bin Abdul Aziz Stadium, Dammam
Attendance: 9,770
Referee: Tullio Lanese (Italy)

=== Group C ===
Pos	Team	Pld	W	D	L	GF	GA	GD	Pts	Group stage result
1	Brazil	3	3	0	0	10	1	+9	6	Advance to knockout stage
2	United States	3	1	1	1	4	4	0	3	Advance to knockout stage
3	East Germany	3	1	0	2	3	4	−1	2	
4	Mali	3	0	1	2	1	9	−8	1	

17 February 1989
16:30

Brazil	2–0	East Germany
Marcelo Henrique 35'; França 68'	(Report)

Prince Abdullah Al-Faisal Stadium, Jeddah
Attendance: 35,000
Referee: Neil Midgley (England)

17 February 1989
18:45

Mali	1–1	United States
Nfaly 42'	(Report)	Snow 11'

Prince Abdullah Al-Faisal Stadium, Jeddah
Attendance: 35,000
Referee: Elías Jácome (Ecuador)

19 February 1989
18:45

Brazil	5–0	Mali
Cássio 50'; Bismarck 53', 83'; Sonny Anderson 66', 80'	(Report)

Prince Abdullah Al-Faisal Stadium, Jeddah
Attendance: 10,000
Referee: Ahmed Mohammed Jassim (Bahrain)

20 February 1989
18:45

East Germany	0–2	United States
	(Report)	Dayak 47'; Snow 87' (pen.)

Prince Abdullah Al-Faisal Stadium, Jeddah
Attendance: 10,000
Referee: Idrissa Sarr (Mauritania)

22 February 1989
16:30

Brazil	3–1	United States
Bismarck 39'; Marcelo Henrique 44'; Sonny Anderson 55'	(Report)	Dayak 10'

Prince Abdullah Al-Faisal Stadium, Jeddah
Attendance: 25,000
Referee: Hubert Forstinger (Austria)

22 February 1989
18:45

East Germany	3–0	Mali
Prausse 28'; Fuchs 46'; Jahnig 55'	(Report)

Prince Abdullah Al-Faisal Stadium, Jeddah
Attendance: 25,000
Referee: José Carlos Ortiz (Colombia)

=== Group D ===
Pos	Team	Pld	W	D	L	GF	GA	GD	Pts	Group stage result
1	Iraq	3	3	0	0	4	0	+4	6	Advance to knockout stage
2	Argentina	3	1	0	2	3	3	0	2	Advance to knockout stage
3	Norway	3	1	0	2	4	5	−1	2	
4	Spain	3	1	0	2	4	7	−3	2	

17 February 1989
16:30

Norway	0–1	Iraq
	(Report)	Saddam 66'

King Fahd Stadium, Taif
Attendance: 14,000
Referee: José Torres Cadena (Colombia)

17 February 1989
18:45

Argentina	1–2	Spain
Simeone 12'	(Report)	Moisés 26'; Villabona 58' (pen.)

King Fahd Stadium, Taif
Attendance: 14,000
Referee: Alexey Spirin (Soviet Union)

19 February 1989
18:45

Norway	0–2	Argentina
	(Report)	Biazotti 5'; Ubaldi 89'

King Fahd Stadium, Taif
Attendance: 3,000
Referee: Arturo Angeles (United States)

20 February 1989
18:45

Iraq	2–0	Spain
Kareem 41'; Hussein 51'	(Report)

King Fahd Stadium, Taif
Attendance: 13,500
Referee: Chen Shengcai (China)

22 February 1989
16:30

Norway	4–2	Spain
Drillestad 43'; Johansen 47'; Bohinen 58'; Mellemstrand 90'	(Report)	Pinilla 46', 49'

King Fahd Stadium, Taif
Attendance: 17,000
Referee: Neji Jouini (Tunisia)

22 February 1989
18:45

Iraq	1–0	Argentina
Shenaishil 67' (pen.)	(Report)

King Fahd Stadium, Taif
Attendance: 17,000
Referee: Jozef Marko (Czechoslovakia)

== Knockout stage ==
Quarter-finals
February 25 - Riyadh
Portugal	1
Colombia	0
February 25 - Jeddah
Brazil	1
Argentina	0
February 25 - Dammam
Soviet Union	4 (3)
Nigeria (p)	4 (5)
February 25 - Taif
Iraq	1
United States	2

Semi-finals
February 28 - Riyadh
Portugal	1
Brazil	0
February 28 - Jeddah
Nigeria (a.e.t.)	2
United States	1

Final
March 3 - Riyadh
Portugal	2
Nigeria	0
Third place
March 3 - Riyadh
Brazil	2
United States	0

=== Quarterfinals ===
25 February 1989
18:00

Portugal	1–0	Colombia
Jorge Couto 40'	(Report)

King Fahd International Stadium, Riyadh
Attendance: 5,000
Referee: Neji Jouini (Tunisia)

25 February 1989
18:00

Soviet Union	4–4 (a.e.t.)	Nigeria
Kiriakov 30', 58'; Tedeev 45'; Salenko 46'	(Report)	Oladimeji 61'; Ohenhen 75'; Elijah 83'; Ugbade 84'
Penalties
Salenko (penalty scored); Bezhenar (penalty scored); Qosimov (penalty missed); Benko (penalty scored)	3–5	(penalty scored) Ohen; (penalty scored) Ogaba; (penalty scored) Onyemachara; (penalty scored) Adepoju; (penalty scored) Elijah

Prince Mohammed Bin Fahad Bin Abdul Aziz Stadium, Dammam
Attendance: 10,000
Referee: Hubert Forstinger (Austria)

25 February 1989
18:45

Brazil	1–0	Argentina
Marcelo Henrique 15'	(Report)

Prince Abdullah Al-Faisal Stadium, Jeddah
Attendance: 35,000
Referee: Tullio Lanese (Italy)

25 February 1989
18:45

Iraq	1–2	United States
Kareem 35'	(Report)	Henderson 17'; Brose 56'

King Fahd Stadium, Taif
Attendance: 18,000
Referee: Aron Schmidhuber (West Germany)

=== Semifinals ===
28 February 1989
18:00

Portugal	1–0	Brazil
Amaral 68'	(Report)

King Fahd International Stadium, Riyadh
Attendance: 15,000
Referee: Jozef Marko (Czechoslovakia)

28 February 1989
18:45

Nigeria	2–1 (a.e.t.)	United States
Adepoju 47', 93'	(Report)	Snow 52' (pen.)

Prince Abdullah Al-Faisal Stadium, Jeddah
Attendance: 40,000
Referee: Neil Midgley (England)

=== Third place play-off ===
3 March 1989
15:45

Brazil	2–0	United States
Franca 65'; Leonardo 69'	(Report)

King Fahd International Stadium, Riyadh
Attendance: 65,000
Referee: Neji Jouini (Tunisia)

=== Final ===
3 March 1989
18:00

Portugal	2–0	Nigeria
Abel Silva 44'; Jorge Couto 76'	(Report)

King Fahd International Stadium, Riyadh
Attendance: 65,000
Referee: Aron Schmidhuber (Germany)

== Result ==
1989 FIFA World Youth Championship winners

Portugal
1st title

== Awards ==
Golden Shoe	Golden Ball	FIFA Fair Play Award
(Soviet Union) Oleg Salenko	(Brazil) Bismarck	United States

== Goalscorers ==
Oleg Salenko of Soviet Union won the Golden Boot award for scoring five goals. In total, 81 goals were scored by 55 different players, with none of them credited as own goal.

5 goals

- (Soviet Union) Oleg Salenko

3 goals

- (Brazil) Bismarck
- (Brazil) Marcelo Henrique
- (Brazil) Sonny Anderson
- (Nigeria) Mutiu Adepoju
- (United States) Steve Snow

2 goals

- (Brazil) Ricardo França
- (Colombia) Wilson Muñoz
- (Czechoslovakia) Radoslav Látal
- (Iraq) Wali Kareem
- (Nigeria) Christopher Ohenhen
- (Portugal) Jorge Couto
- (Soviet Union) Bakhva Tedeev
- (Soviet Union) Sergei Kiriakov
- (Spain) Antonio Pinilla
- (Syria) Abdul Latif Helou
- (United States) Troy Dayak

1 goal

- (Argentina) Diego Simeone
- (Argentina) Humberto Biazotti
- (Argentina) Martín Ubaldi
- (Brazil) Cássio
- (Brazil) Leonardo Araújo
- (Colombia) Diego Osorio
- (Costa Rica) Danilo Brenes
- (Costa Rica) Rónald González Brenes
- (East Germany) Henri Fuchs
- (East Germany) Stephan Prausse
- (East Germany) Uwe Jahnig
- (Iraq) Laith Hussein
- (Iraq) Naeem Saddam
- (Iraq) Radhi Shenaishil
- (Nigeria) Christopher Nwosu
- (Nigeria) Oladimeji Lawal
- (Nigeria) Nduka Ugbade
- (Nigeria) Samuel Elijah
- (Norway) Bjørn Johansen
- (Norway) Lars Bohinen
- (Norway) Oystein Drillestad
- (Norway) Oyvind Mellemstrand
- (Mali) Kante Nfaly
- (Portugal) Abel Silva
- (Portugal) João Pinto
- (Portugal) Jorge Amaral
- (Portugal) Paulo Alves
- (Saudi Arabia) Hamad Al Debaikhi
- (Saudi Arabia) Khaled Al Harbi
- (Saudi Arabia) Khalid Al Rowaihi
- (Saudi Arabia) Saadoun Al Suraiti
- (Soviet Union) Andrei Timoshenko
- (Soviet Union) Oleg Matveev
- (Spain) David Villabona
- (Spain) Moisés García León
- (Syria) Mohammad Afash
- (Syria) Yasser Sibai
- (United States) Chris Henderson
- (United States) Dario Brose

== Final ranking ==
Pos	Team	Pld	W	D	L	GF	GA	GD	Pts	Final result
1	Portugal	6	5	0	1	6	3	+3	10	Champions
2	Nigeria	6	2	2	2	9	10	−1	6	Runners-up
3	Brazil	6	5	0	1	13	2	+11	10	Third place
4	United States	6	2	1	3	7	9	−2	5	Fourth place
5	Soviet Union	4	3	1	0	11	6	+5	7	Eliminated in Quarter-finals
6	Iraq	4	3	0	1	5	2	+3	6	Eliminated in Quarter-finals
7	Argentina	4	1	0	3	3	4	−1	2	Eliminated in Quarter-finals
8	Colombia	4	1	0	3	3	5	−2	2	Eliminated in Quarter-finals
9	Czechoslovakia	3	1	1	1	2	2	0	3	Eliminated in Group stage
10	Saudi Arabia (H)	3	1	0	2	4	3	+1	2	Eliminated in Group stage
11	Norway	3	1	0	2	4	5	−1	2	Eliminated in Group stage
12	East Germany	3	1	0	2	3	4	−1	2	Eliminated in Group stage
13	Syria	3	1	0	2	4	6	−2	2	Eliminated in Group stage
14	Costa Rica	3	1	0	2	2	4	−2	2	Eliminated in Group stage
15	Spain	3	1	0	2	4	7	−3	2	Eliminated in Group stage
16	Mali	3	0	1	2	1	9	−8	1	Eliminated in Group stage

Source: rsssf.com
(H) Hosts
