= 1993 African Cup of Champions Clubs final =

1993 African Champions Cup final
- Event: 1993 African Cup of Champions Clubs
Asante Kotoko	Zamalek
(Ghana)	(Egypt)
0	0
- Zamalek won 7–6 on penalties

First leg
Asante Kotoko	Zamalek
0	0
- Date: 28 November 1993
- Venue: Kumasi Sports Stadium, Kumasi
- Referee: Petros Mathabela (South Africa)

Second leg
Zamalek	Asante Kotoko
0	0
- Date: 10 December 1993
- Venue: Cairo International Stadium, Cairo
- Referee: Neji Jouini (Tunisia)

The 1993 African Cup of Champions Clubs final was a football tie held over two legs in December 1993 between Asante Kotoko, and Zamalek.

Zamalek from Egypt won that final 7 – 6 in the penalty shoot-out, with the aggregate ending 0 – 0, to retain Ahmed Sékou Touré trophy, as the third team to win the tournament for three times after Hafia Football Club & Canon Yaoundé.

== Match details ==
=== First leg ===
28 November 1993

Asante Kotoko (Ghana)	0 – 0	(Egypt) Zamalek

Kumasi Sports Stadium
Referee: Petros Mathabela (South Africa)

Asante Kotoko	Zamalek

Asante Kotoko:
GK	(Ghana) Anthony Mensah
CB	(Ghana) Yaw Owusu
CB	(Ghana) Edward Agyeman-Duah
CB	(Ghana) Frank Amankwah
RM	(Ghana) Emmanuel Ampeah
CM	(Ghana) Kofi Owusu
CM	(Ghana) Alex Nyarko
LM	(Ghana) George Arthur
CM	(Ghana) Joe Okyere
CF	(Togo) Raphaël Patron Akakpo
CF	(Ghana) Mamood Amadu
Substitutes:
Manager:
(Ghana) Malik Jabir

Zamalek:
GK	1	(Egypt) Hussein El-Sayed
RB	11	(Egypt) Hussein Abdel-Latif
CB	2	(Egypt) Hesham Yakan (c)
CB	6	(Egypt) Sami El-Sheshini
CB		(Egypt) Ahmed Ramzy	(substituted off) ?'
LB	10	(Egypt) Effat Nssar
CF		(Egypt) Ismail Youssef
CM	15	(Egypt) Ashraf Youssef
MF	4	(Egypt) Khaled El-Ghandour
CM	8	(Nigeria) Emmanuel Amuneke
CF	16	(Egypt) Ayman Mansour
Substitutes:
CB		(Egypt) Tamer Abdel-Hamid	(substituted on) ?'
Manager:
(Egypt) Mahmoud El-Gohary

=== Second leg ===
10 December 1993

Zamalek (Egypt)	0 – 0	(Ghana) Asante Kotoko
Penalties
El-Ghandour (penalty missed); Nssar (penalty scored); Abdel-Latif (penalty scored); Amuneke (penalty scored); Ibrahim (penalty scored); El-Sheshini (penalty scored); I. Youssef (penalty missed); Mansour (penalty scored); A. Youssef (penalty scored)	7 – 6	(penalty scored) Manso; (penalty scored) Gyamfi; (penalty missed) ? (penalty scored) Owusu; (penalty scored) Mensah; (penalty scored) Amankwah; (penalty missed) Agyeman-Duah; (penalty scored) Arthur; (penalty missed) Yussif

Cairo Stadium
Referee: Neji Jouini (Tunisia)

Zamalek	Asante Kotoko

Zamalek:
GK	1	(Egypt) Hussein El-Sayed (substituted off) 90+2'
CB	11	(Egypt) Hussein Abdel-Latif
CB	2	(Egypt) Hesham Yakan (c)
LB	6	(Egypt) Sami El-Sheshini
CM	15	(Egypt) Ashraf Youssef
CM		(Egypt) Essam Marei (substituted off) ?'
RW		(Egypt) Ismail Youssef
AM	8	(Nigeria) Emmanuel Amuneke
AM	4	(Egypt) Khaled El-Ghandour
FW	10	(Egypt) Effat Nssar	(yellow card) ?'
FW	16	(Egypt) Ayman Mansour
Substitutions:
GK	7	(Egypt) Nader El-Sayed		(substituted on) 90+2'
		(Egypt) Moustafa Ibrahim		(substituted on) ?'
Manager:
(Egypt) Mahmoud El-Gohary

Asante Kotoko:
GK	1	(Ghana) Anthony Mensah
LB		(Ghana) Yaw Owusu
CB	15	(Ghana) Edward Agyeman-Duah
CB	2	(Ghana) Frank Amankwah
RB
LM
CM
CM
RM	8	(Ghana) Oli Rahman	(red card) 69'
FW		(Ghana) George Arthur
FW	10	(Ghana) Seidu Yussif
Substitutes:
Manager:
(Ghana) Malik Jabir

== Notes and references ==
- https://www.angelfire.com/ak/EgyptianSports/ZamalekAfr1993.html
