= 1992 Arab Cup squads =

as 1992 Arab Cup squads

as 1992 Arab Games squads

Below is a list of squads used in the 1992 Arab Cup, counted also for the 1992 Arab Games football tournament.

== Group A ==
=== Egypt ===
Coach: Mahmoud El-Gohary

No.	Pos.	Player	Date of birth (age)	Caps	Goals	Club
1	GK	Nader El-Sayed	31 December 1972 (aged 19)			(Egyptian Football Association) Zamalek
	GK	Ahmed Shobair	28 September 1960 (aged 31)			(Egyptian Football Association) Al Ahly
2	DF	Tamer Abdul Hamid	16 October 1971 (aged 20)			(Egyptian Football Association) Zamalek
3	DF	Khaled El-Ghandour	27 July 1970 (aged 22)			(Egyptian Football Association) Zamalek
6	DF	Hesham Yakan (c)	10 August 1962 (aged 30)			(Egyptian Football Association) Zamalek
13	DF	Mohamed Ibrahim				
15	DF	Amr El-Hadidy	24 December 1969 (aged 22)			(Egyptian Football Association) Ghazl El Mahalla
	DF	Ibrahim Hassan	10 August 1966 (aged 26)			(Egyptian Football Association) Al Ahly
	DF	Hussein Abdel-Latif	17 December 1965 (aged 26)			(Egyptian Football Association) Zamalek
	DF	Sami El-Sheshini	23 January 1972 (aged 20)			(Egyptian Football Association) Zamalek
7	MF	Ismail Youssef	28 June 1964 (aged 28)			(Egyptian Football Association) Zamalek
8	MF	Ali Maher	3 December 1973 (aged 18)			(Egyptian Football Association) Tersana
20	MF	Ahmed El-Kass	8 July 1965 (aged 27)			(Egyptian Football Association) Olympic SC
	MF	Yasser Rayyan	25 March 1970 (aged 22)			(Egyptian Football Association) Al Ahly
9	FW	Hossam Hassan	10 August 1966 (aged 26)			(Egyptian Football Association) Al Ahly
14	FW	Khaled Eid	29 March 1964 (aged 28)			(Egyptian Football Association) Ghazl El Mahalla
	FW	Ayman Mansour	9 September 1963 (aged 28)			(Egyptian Football Association) Zamalek

=== Jordan ===
Coach: Mohammad Awad

No.	Pos.	Player	Date of birth (age)	Caps	Goals	Club
1	GK	Naser Ghandour	10 December 1969 (aged 22)			(Jordan Football Association) Al-Wehdat
2	DF	Mohammad Al-Khazali	1 October 1966 (aged 25)			(Jordan Football Association) Al-Ramtha
13	DF	Ahmed Abdel-Qader	10 November 1968 (aged 23)			(Jordan Football Association) Sahab
15	DF	Murad Al-Hourani	25 December 1970 (aged 21)			(Jordan Football Association) Al-Ramtha
18	DF	Mohannad Mahadeen	7 April 1973 (aged 19)			(Jordan Football Association) Al-Faisaly
4	MF	Samer Jameel				
5	MF	Hisham Abdul-Munam	18 November 1969 (aged 22)			(Jordan Football Association) Al-Wehdat
7	MF	Mousa Shtaian				
16	MF	Jamal Abu-Abed (c)	19 January 1965 (aged 27)			(Jordan Football Association) Al-Faisaly
	MF	Soubhi Suliman	8 February 1969 (aged 23)			(Jordan Football Association) Al-Faisaly
10	FW	Aref Hussein				(Jordan Football Association) Al-Hussein Irbid
20	FW	Jeris Tadrus	17 November 1972 (aged 19)			(Jordan Football Association) Al-Faisaly
	FW	Mohammad Al-Ashhab	28 March 1965 (aged 27)			(Jordan Football Association) Sahab

=== Kuwait ===
Coach: (Brazil) Paulo Luiz Campos

No.	Pos.	Player	Date of birth (age)	Caps	Goals	Club
	MF	Wail Sulaiman Al-Habashi	8 August 1964 (aged 28)			(Kuwait Football Association) Al-Jahra
	MF	Hamad Al-Saleh				(Kuwait Football Association)
		Waleed Al-Felaih				(Kuwait Football Association)

== Group B ==
=== Palestine ===
Coach:

No.	Pos.	Player	Date of birth (age)	Caps	Goals	Club
		Ali Ismail				(Syrian Football Association) Hurriya SC

=== Saudi Arabia ===
Coach: (Brazil) Nelsinho

No.	Pos.	Player	Date of birth (age)	Caps	Goals	Club
	GK	Saud Al-Sammar	3 November 1969 (aged 22)			(Saudi Arabian Football Federation) Al-Shabab Riyadh
	GK	Khaled Al-Dayel	21 January 1968 (aged 24)			(Saudi Arabian Football Federation) Al Hilal SFC
	GK	Shaker Al-Shujaa	2 August 1972 (aged 20)			(Saudi Arabian Football Federation) Al-Shabab Riyadh
	DF	Sulaiman Al-Reshoudi	3 September 1972 (aged 20)			(Saudi Arabian Football Federation) Al Hilal SFC
	DF	Saleh Al-Dawod	24 September 1968 (aged 23)			(Saudi Arabian Football Federation) Al-Shabab Riyadh
	DF	Abdul Rahman Al-Roomi	28 October 1969 (aged 22)			(Saudi Arabian Football Federation) Al-Shabab Riyadh
	DF	Abdullah Sharideh Al-Dosari	23 November 1970 (aged 21)			(Saudi Arabian Football Federation) Al-Qadsiah
	DF	Ghazi Assiri				(Saudi Arabian Football Federation) Al-Qadsiah
	DF	Mohammed Al-Subait				(Saudi Arabian Football Federation) Al-Riyadh SC
	DF	Mussad Al-Terair	31 August 1970 (aged 22)			(Saudi Arabian Football Federation) Al-Nassr
	MF	Hamzah Saleh	19 April 1967 (aged 25)			(Saudi Arabian Football Federation) Al-Ahli Jeddah
	MF	Khaled Al-Hazaa	2 December 1971 (aged 20)			(Saudi Arabian Football Federation) Al-Nassr
	MF	Khaled Massad	23 November 1971 (aged 20)			(Saudi Arabian Football Federation) Al-Ahli Jeddah
	MF	Salem Srour	21 August 1972 (aged 20)			(Saudi Arabian Football Federation) Al-Qadsiah
	MF	Saeed Al-Owairan	17 August 1967 (aged 25)			(Saudi Arabian Football Federation) Al-Shabab Riyadh
	MF	Abdulaziz Al-Razqan	3 October 1970 (aged 21)			(Saudi Arabian Football Federation) Al-Shabab Riyadh
	MF	Fuad Anwar	13 October 1970 (aged 21)			(Saudi Arabian Football Federation) Al-Shabab Riyadh
	MF	Fahad Al-Harifi	10 September 1965 (aged 26)			(Saudi Arabian Football Federation) Al-Nassr
	MF	Youssif Al-Thunian	18 November 1963 (aged 28)			(Saudi Arabian Football Federation) Al Hilal SFC
	FW	Hamzah Idris	8 October 1972 (aged 19)			(Saudi Arabian Football Federation) Ohod
	FW	Sami Al-Jaber	11 December 1972 (aged 19)			(Saudi Arabian Football Federation) Al Hilal SFC
	FW	Fahad Mehallel	11 November 1970 (aged 21)			(Saudi Arabian Football Federation) Al Hilal SFC
	FW	Majed Abdullah	11 January 1959 (aged 33)			(Saudi Arabian Football Federation) Al-Nassr
	FW	Waleed Al-Terair	23 November 1971 (aged 20)			(Saudi Arabian Football Federation) Al-Nassr

=== Syria ===
Coach: (Romania) Virgil Dridea

No.	Pos.	Player	Date of birth (age)	Caps	Goals	Club
22	GK	Malek Shakuhi	5 April 1960 (aged 32)			(Syrian Football Association) Jableh
4	DF	Ali Cheikh Dib	1 September 1972 (aged 20)			(Syrian Football Association) Hurriya SC
	DF	Yasser Sibai	6 February 1972 (aged 20)			(Syrian Football Association) Al-Ittihad Aleppo
	DF	Hussam Al Sayed	2 February 1972 (aged 20)			(Syrian Football Association) Al-Wahda
	DF	Ammar Awad	10 October 1972 (aged 19)			(Syrian Football Association) Hutteen
6	MF	Hisham Khalaf	1 November 1969 (aged 22)			(Syrian Football Association) Al-Fotuwa
10	MF	Mohammad Afash	31 October 1966 (aged 25)			(Syrian Football Association) Al-Ittihad Aleppo
	MF	Abdul Kader Kardaghli	1 January 1961 (aged 31)			(Syrian Football Association) Tishreen
	MF	Mustafa Kadir				(Syrian Football Association) Hurriya SC
	MF	Anas Makhlouf	12 June 1973 (aged 19)			(Syrian Football Association)
	MF	Redwan Ajam	20 November 1971 (aged 20)			(Syrian Football Association) Al-Karamah
16	FW	Assaf Khalifa	3 July 1968 (aged 24)			(Syrian Football Association) Al-Wahda
	FW	Nizar Mahrous	12 March 1963 (aged 29)			(Syrian Football Association) Al-Wahda
	FW	Walid Al-Nasser	18 June 1965 (aged 27)			(Syrian Football Association)
	FW	Hatem Ghaeb	25 September 1971 (aged 20)			(Syrian Football Association) Al-Shorta
	FW	Mounaf Ramadan	19 October 1972 (aged 19)			(Syrian Football Association) Jableh
		Muhammad Khaunda				(Syrian Football Association)
		...				
