= 1992 Arab Cup final =

1992 Arab Cup final 1992 Arab Games football tournament final
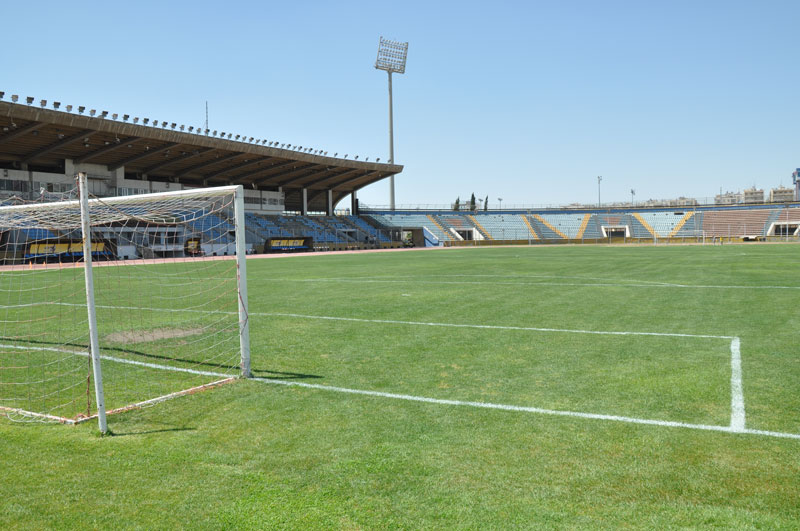
- Event: 1992 Arab Cup; 1992 Arab Games
Egypt	Saudi Arabia
(Egypt)	(Saudi Arabia)
3	2
- Date: 11 September 1992
- Venue: Al-Hamadaniah Stadium, Aleppo
- Referee: Nizar Watti (Syria)

The 1992 Arab Cup final was a football match that took place on 11 September 1992, at the Al-Hamadaniah Stadium in Aleppo, Syria, to determine the winner of the 1992 Arab Cup and simultaneously the gold medal of 1992 Arab Games. Egypt defeated Saudi Arabia 3–2 to win their first Arab Cup and their third gold medal at the Arab Games.

== Road to the final ==
Egypt		Saudi Arabia	
Opponents	Results	Opponents	Results
Group stage
Jordan	1–1	Syria	1–1
Kuwait	1–0	Palestine	2–1
Semi-finals
Syria	0–0 (4–3 p)	Kuwait	2–0

== Match ==
=== Details ===
17 September 1992
17:00 UTC+2

Egypt	3–2	Saudi Arabia
El-Sheshini 4' (pen.); El-Kass 26'; H. Hassan 85'		Al-Roomi 9'; Al-Owairan 73'

Al-Hamadaniah Stadium, Aleppo
Referee: Nizar Watti (Syria)

Egypt	Saudi Arabia

Egypt:
GK	1	Nader El-Sayed
DF	2	Tamer Abdul Hamid
DF	–	Hussein Abdel-Latif
DF	6	Hesham Yakan (c)
DF	–	Sami El-Sheshini
MF	7	Ismail Youssef
MF	8	Ali Maher
MF	20	Ahmed El-Kass
FW	9	Hossam Hassan
FW	14	Khaled Eid	Substituted off
FW	–	Ayman Mansour
Substitutes:
GK	–	Ahmed Shobair
DF	3	Khaled El-Ghandour
DF	13	Mohamed Ibrahim
DF	15	Amr El-Hadidy
MF	–	Yasser Rayyan	Substituted on
Manager:
Mahmoud El-Gohary

Saudi Arabia:
GK	1	Khaled Al-Dayel
DF	–	Mussad Al-Terair
DF	–	Saleh Al-Dawod
DF	–	Sulaiman Al-Reshoudi
DF	–	Abdul Rahman Al-Roomi
MF	6	Fuad Anwar
MF	11	Saeed Al-Owairan
MF	14	Khaled Massad
MF	–	Youssif Al-Thunian
FW	–	Sami Al-Jaber
FW	–	Majed Abdullah
Substitutes:
GK	–	Saud Al-Sammar
DF	–	Abdullah Al-Shreidah
MF	–	Khaled Al-Hazaa
FW	–	Fahad Al-Mehallel
FW	–	Hamzah Idris
Manager:
(Brazil) Nelsinho

Assistant referees:
... ... (...)
... ... (...)
Fourth official:
... ... (...)

Man of the Match:
... ... (...)
