= 2017–18 Zamalek SC season =

Zamalek
2017–18 season
- Chairman: (Egypt) Mortada Mansour
- Manager: (Montenegro) Nebojša Jovović (until 3 January 2018) (Egypt) Ehab Galal (until 12 April 2018) (Egypt) Khaled Galal
- Egyptian Premier League: 4th
- Egypt Cup: Winner
- CAF Confederation Cup: First round
| Home colours | Away colours |

The 2017–18 season is Zamalek's 59th season in the Egyptian Premier League and 59th consecutive season in the top flight of Egyptian football. The club will participate in the Egyptian Premier League, Egypt Cup and the CAF Confederation Cup.

== Friendlies ==
| 17 August 2017 | Zamalek (Egypt) | 8 – 0 | (Egypt) Kahrbaa' Al-Qahira |

| 24 August 2017 | Zamalek (Egypt) | 3 – 0 | (Egypt) El-Sekka El-Hadid |

| 27 August 2017 | Zamalek (Egypt) | 1 – 3 | (Egypt) Haras El Hodoud |

| 29 August 2017 | Zamalek (Egypt) | 2 – 0 | (Kuwait) Al-Salmiya |

| 30 August 2017 | Zamalek (Egypt) | 3 – 2 | (Saudi Arabia) Al-Raed |

| 3 September 2017 | Al-Faisaly (Jordan) | 2 – 2 | (Egypt) Zamalek |

| 23 October 2017 | Zamalek (Egypt) | 2 – 0 | (Egypt) Molaweloon |

| 6 October 2017 | Zamalek (Egypt) | 4 – 2 | (Egypt) Gaish |

| 7 October 2017 | Zamalek (Egypt) | 3 – 0 | (Saudi Arabia) Hetten |

| 14 October 2017 | Zamalek (Egypt) | 7 – 0 | (Egypt) Dakhlia |

| 30 October 2017 | Zamalek (Egypt) | 3 – 2 | Yemen |

| 18 November 2017 | Zamalek (Egypt) | 1 – 0 | (Egypt) El-Bank El-Ahly |
| 16:30 |

| Zamalek (Egypt) | 4 – 1 | (Egypt) Zamalek (U-18) |

| Zamalek (Egypt) | 13 – 0 | (Egypt) Kerdasa |

| Zamalek (Egypt) | 5 – 0 | (Egypt) Coca-Cola |

| Zamalek (Egypt) | 0 – 0 | (Egypt) Petrojet |

== Players ==
=== Current first team squad ===
Note: Flags indicate national team as defined under FIFA eligibility rules; some limited exceptions apply. Players may hold more than one non-FIFA nationality.

| No. | Pos. | Nation | Player |
|---|---|---|---|
| 1 | GK | EGY | Ahmed El-Shenawy |
| 2 | DF | EGY | Mohammed Magdy |
| 3 | MF | EGY | Tarek Hamed |
| 4 | MF | EGY | Ahmed Tawfik ^{(3rd captain)} |
| 5 | DF | EGY | Ali Gabr |
| 6 | MF | EGY | Mahmoud Abdel-Aati |
| 7 | DF | EGY | Hazem Emam ^{(captain)} |
| 8 | MF | EGY | Mohamed Ashraf |
| 9 | FW | EGY | Khaled Kamar |
| 10 | FW | EGY | Youssef Obama |
| 11 | FW | EGY | Mohamed Al Shamy |
| 12 | MF | EGY | Ahmed Kabouria |
| 13 | FW | EGY | Mohammed Ramadan |
| 14 | MF | EGY | Ayman Hefny |
| 15 | MF | BFA | Maarouf Youssef |
| 16 | GK | EGY | Mahmoud Abdel Rahim ^{(4th captain )} |
| 17 | FW | EGY | Basem Morsi |

| No. | Pos. | Nation | Player |
|---|---|---|---|
| 18 | FW | EGY | Ahmed Refaat |
| 19 | DF | EGY | Ahmed Magdi |
| 20 | MF | EGY | Mohamed Ibrahim ^{(2nd captain)} |
| 21 | MF | EGY | Ahmed Madbouly |
| 22 | MF | EGY | Abdallah Gomaa |
| 23 | FW | COD | Kabongo Kasongo |
| 24 | DF | EGY | Mahmoud Alaa El-Din |
| 25 | MF | EGY | Ahmed Dawouda |
| 26 | DF | SYR | Alaa Al Shbli |
| 27 | FW | GHA | Benjamin Acheampong |
| 28 | DF | EGY | Mahmoud Hamdy |
| 29 | DF | SYR | Moayad Ajan |
| 30 | FW | EGY | Salah Ashour |
| 31 | GK | EGY | Omar Salah |
| 32 | GK | EGY | Mahmoud Abdel Monsef |
| 33 | DF | EGY | Ahmed Aboul-Fotouh |
| 34 | FW | CIV | Razack Cisse |

=== Out on loan ===
Note: Flags indicate national team as defined under FIFA eligibility rules; some limited exceptions apply. Players may hold more than one non-FIFA nationality.

| No. | Pos. | Nation | Player |
|---|---|---|---|
| — | DF | EGY | Mohamed Ahmed Kamatsho (at El Ittihad Alexandria until 30 June 2018) |
| — | MF | EGY | Ramzi Khaled (at El Ittihad Alexandria until 30 June 2018) |
| — | FW | EGY | Hossam Salama (at El-Ittihad Alexandria until 30 June 2018) |
| — | DF | EGY | Ali Fathy (at El Ittihad Alexandria until 30 June 2018) |
| — | FW | EGY | Mostafa Mohamed (at Tanta SC until 30 June 2018) |

| No. | Pos. | Nation | Player |
|---|---|---|---|
| — | FW | EGY | Mohamed Salem (at Petrojet until 30 June 2018) |
| — | DF | EGY | Islam Gamal (at Petrojet until 30 June 2018) |
| — | MF | EGY | Shikabala (at Al-Raed until 30 June 2018) |
| — | FW | EGY | Mostafa Fathi (at Al-Taawoun FC until 30 June 2018) |
| — | FW | EGY | Kahraba (at Al-Ittihad until 30 June 2018) |

=== Youth academy squad ===
Note: Flags indicate national team as defined under FIFA eligibility rules; some limited exceptions apply. Players may hold more than one non-FIFA nationality.

| No. | Pos. | Nation | Player |
|---|---|---|---|
| — | DF | EGY | Mohamed Hamdy |
| — | MF | EGY | Ahmed Adel Messi |
| — | FW | EGY | Mahmoud Hassan |

== 2017–18 Egyptian Premier League ==
=== Position ===
| Pos | Team | Pld | W | D | L | GF | GA | GD | Pts | Qualification or relegation |
|---|---|---|---|---|---|---|---|---|---|---|
| 2 | Ismaily | 34 | 19 | 11 | 4 | 50 | 27 | +23 | 68 | Qualification for the Champions League |
| 3 | Al Masry | 34 | 18 | 9 | 7 | 52 | 34 | +18 | 63 | Qualification for the Confederation Cup (Note: Zamalek qualified for the Confederation Cup by winning the 2017–18 Egypt Cup.) |
| 4 | Zamalek | 34 | 18 | 7 | 9 | 45 | 30 | +15 | 61 | Qualification for the Confederation Cup |
| 5 | Smouha | 34 | 14 | 9 | 11 | 37 | 26 | +11 | 51 | |
| 6 | ENPPI | 34 | 12 | 14 | 8 | 39 | 38 | +1 | 50 | |

Source: Soccerway
Rules for classification: 1) Points; 2) Head-to-Head points; 3) Head-to-Head goal difference; 4) Head-to-Head goal scored; 5) Head-to-Head away goal scored; 6) Goal difference; 7) Goal scored.

=== Results ===
==== Results by round ====
| Round | 1 | 2 | 3 | 4 | 5 | 6 | 7 | 8 | 9 | 10 | 11 | 12 | 13 | 14 | 15 | 16 | 17 | 18 | 19 | 20 | 21 | 22 | 23 | 24 | 25 | 26 | 27 | 28 | 29 | 30 | 31 | 32 | 33 | 34 |
|---|---|---|---|---|---|---|---|---|---|---|---|---|---|---|---|---|---|---|---|---|---|---|---|---|---|---|---|---|---|---|---|---|---|---|
| Ground | A | H | A | H | A | H | A | H | A | H | A | H | A | H | A | H | H | A | H | A | H | A | H | A | H | H | A | H | A | H | A | H | A | A |
| Result | D | W | W | D | D | L | W | W | W | L | D | L | W | W | W | L | L | D | W | L | D | W | W | W | W | W | W | W | L | L | L | D | W | W |
| Position | 7 | 3 | 3 | 3 | 4 | 5 | 5 | 3 | 3 | 3 | 5 | 5 | 5 | 4 | 4 | 4 | 4 | 5 | 4 | 5 | 5 | 4 | 4 | 3 | 3 | 2 | 2 | 3 | 3 | 3 | 3 | 3 | 3 | 4 |

Updated to match(es) played on 3 November 2017. Source:
A = Away; H = Home; W = Win; D = Draw; L = Loss

==== Match details ====
| 9 September 2017 1 | El-Entag El-Harby | 1 – 1 | Zamalek |
| 20:00 UTC+2 |

| 17 September 2017 2 | Zamalek | 3 – 0 | El Dakhleya | Cairo |
| 20:15 UTC+2 | | | | Stadium: Petro Sport Stadium; Referee: Mahmoud Ashour |

| 22 September 2017 3 | Al Masry | 1 – 2 | Zamalek |

| 29 September 2017 4 | Zamalek | 0 – 0 | ENPPI |

| 13 October 2017 5 | Tanta | 1 – 1 | Zamalek |

| 20 October 2017 6 | Zamalek | 0 – 3 | Smouha |

| 26 October 2017 7 | Wadi Degla | 0 – 3 | Zamalek |

| 3 November 2017 8 | Zamalek | 3 – 0 | Petrojet |

| 17 November 2017 9 | Zamalek | 2 – 1 | Al Nasr |

| 27 November 2017 11 | Zamalek | 1 – 3 | Misr Lel Makkasa |

| 2 December 2017 12 | El Raja | 1 – 1 | Zamalek |

| 14 December 2017 13 | Zamalek | 0 – 1 | Ismaily |

| 20 December 2017 14 | Al Ittihad | 0 – 2 | Zamalek |

| 26 December 2017 15 | Zamalek | 1 – 0 | Al Mokawloon |

| 30 December 2017 16 | Al Assiouty Sport | 0 – 1 | Zamalek |

| 3 January 2018 10 | Tala'ea El Gaish | 1 – 0 | Zamalek |

| 8 January 2018 17 | Zamalek | 0 – 3 | Al Ahly |

| 14 January 2018 18 | Zamalek | 0 – 0 | El-Entag El-Harby |

| 18 January 2018 19 | El Dakhleya | 1 – 2 | Zamalek |

| 24 January 2018 20 | Zamalek | 0 – 1 | Al Masry |

| 31 January 2018 21 | ENPPI | 0 – 0 | Zamalek |

| 4 February 2018 22 | Zamalek | 2 – 1 | Tanta |

| 10 February 2018 23 | Smouha | 0 – 1 | Zamalek |

| 14 February 2018 24 | Zamalek | 1 – 0 | Wadi Degla |

| 19 February 2018 25 | Petrojet | 1 – 3 | Zamalek |

| 22 February 2018 26 | Al Nasr | 1 – 2 | Zamalek |

| 27 February 2018 27 | Zamalek | 3 – 0 | Tala'ea El Gaish |

| 14 March 2018 29 | Zamalek | 4 – 1 | El Raja |

| 2 April 2018 30 | Ismaily | 3 – 1 | Zamalek |

| 8 April 2018 28 | Misr Lel Makkasa | 1 – 0 | Zamalek |

| 12 April 2018 31 | Zamalek | 1 – 2 | Al Ittihad |

| 18 April 2018 32 | Al Mokawloon | 0 – 0 | Zamalek |

| 22 April 2018 33 | Zamalek | 2 – 1 | Al Assiouty Sport |

| 26 April 2018 34 | Al Ahly | 1 – 2 | Zamalek |
