= 1993 African Cup of Champions Clubs =

Tournament details
- Dates: 1993
- Teams: 45 (from 44 associations)

Final positions
- Champions: (Egypt) Zamalek (3rd title)
- Runners-up: (Ghana) Asante Kotoko

Tournament statistics
- Matches played: 73
- Goals scored: 174 (2.38 per match)

The 1993 African Cup of Champions Clubs was the 29th edition of the annual international club football competition held in the CAF region (Africa), the African Cup of Champions Clubs. It determined that year's club champion of association football in Africa.

Zamalek SC from Egypt won that final, and became for the third time CAF club champion.

== Preliminary round ==
Team 1	Agg.	Team 2	1st leg	2nd leg
Akonangui FC (Equatorial Guinea)	1–4	(Central African Republic) TP USCA Bangui	1–2	0–2
Costa do Sol (Mozambique)	2–1	(Namibia) Ramblers FC	2–1	0–0
Djoliba AC (Mali)	2–1	(Mauritania) ASC Sonader	1–0	1–1
SC Kiyovu Sport (Rwanda)	w/o^{1}	(Malawi) Bata Bullets	–	–
Lobatse CS Gunners (Botswana)	0–6	(South Africa) Kaizer Chiefs	0–1	0–5
LPRC Oilers (Liberia)	w/o^{1}	(Togo) Étoile Filante (Lomé)	–	–
Matlama FC (Lesotho)	3–4	(Mauritius) Sunrise Flacq United	2–1	1–3
Mbabane Highlanders (Eswatini)	0–3	(Madagascar) AS Sotema	0–1	0–2
ASEC Ndiambour (Senegal)	3–2	(Cape Verde) CS Mindelense	1–1	2–1
Primeiro de Agosto (Angola)	w/o^{1}	(Benin) Buffles du Borgou	–	–
Saint-George SA (Ethiopia)	1–2	(Tanzania) Malindi FC	1–1	0–1
Sahel SC (Niger)	4–0	(Chad) Elect-Sport FC	2–0	2–0
Sporting Bissau (Guinea-Bissau)	w/o^{1}	(Burkina Faso) EF Ouagadougou	–	–

^{1} Bata Bullets, Étoile Filante (Lomé), Buffles du Borgou FC and Sporting Bissau all withdrew.

== First round ==
Team 1	Agg.	Team 2	1st leg	2nd leg
AS Sotema (Madagascar)	w/o^{1}	(Zimbabwe) Black Aces	–	–
AFC Leopards (Kenya)	1–2	(Zambia) Nkana Red Devils	1–1	0–1
AS Sogara (Gabon)	2–0	(Republic of the Congo) Étoile du Congo	2–0	0–0
Costa do Sol (Mozambique)	w/o^{1}	(Zaire) US Bilombe	–	–
Djoliba AC (Mali)	1–3	(Ivory Coast) ASEC Mimosas	1–1	0–2
EF Ouagadougou (Burkina Faso)	1–2	(Algeria) MC Oran	1–0	0–2
Kawkab Marrakech (Morocco)	5–1	(Guinea) Horoya AC	5–0	0–1
Kiyovu Sports (Rwanda)	3–9	(South Africa) Kaizer Chiefs	2–5	1–4
LPRC Oilers (Liberia)	w/o ^{2}	(Tunisia) Club Africain	–	–
Malindi FC (Tanzania)	0–5	(Egypt) Zamalek	0–1	0–4
SC Villa (Uganda)	2–2 (a)	(Burundi) Vital'O FC	1–0	1–2
ASEC Ndiambour (Senegal)	3–4	(Morocco) Wydad AC	2–1	1–3
Primeiro de Agosto (Angola)	2–4	(Cameroon) RC Bafoussam	2–2	0–2
Sahel SC (Niger)	0–2	(Ghana) Asante Kotoko	0–0	0–2
Sunrise Flacq United (Mauritius)	3–0	(Sudan) Hilal Alsahil	2–0	1–0
TP USCA Bangui (Central African Republic)	3–5	(Nigeria) Stationery Stores	1–3	2–2

^{1} Black Aces and US Bilombe both withdrew.
^{2} LPRC Oilers were ejected from the competition and fined $3,000 after Liberian immigration officials refused the Club Africain team for the first leg entry into the country.

== Second round ==
Team 1	Agg.	Team 2	1st leg	2nd leg
AS Sotema (Madagascar)	2–8	(Uganda) SC Villa	0–2	2–6
AS Sogara (Gabon)	3–2	(Tunisia) Club Africain	1–0	2–2
ASEC Mimosas (Ivory Coast)	3–1	(Mozambique) Costa do Sol	2–0	1–1
Asante Kotoko (Ghana)	3–1	(Morocco) Kawkab Marrakech	3–0	0–1
Kaizer Chiefs (South Africa)	2–2 (a)	(Egypt) Zamalek	2–1	0–1
Nkana Red Devils (Zambia)	1–1 (a)	(Mauritius) Sunrise Flacq United	0–0	1–1
RC Bafoussam (Cameroon)	1–2	(Algeria) MC Oran	1–0	0–2
Wydad AC (Morocco)	4–5	(Nigeria) Stationery Stores	3–1	1–4

== Quarter-finals ==
Team 1	Agg.	Team 2	1st leg	2nd leg
AS Sogara (Gabon)	3–3	(Nigeria) Stationery Stores	3–2	0–1
SC Villa (Uganda)	1–3	(Ivory Coast) ASEC Mimosas	1–1	0–2^{1}
Nkana Red Devils (Zambia)	1–3	(Ghana) Asante Kotoko	1–0	0–3
Zamalek (Egypt)	5–1	(Algeria) MC Oran	4–0	1–1

^{1} SC Villa withdrew on the morning of the 2nd leg; they were banned from CAF competitions for two years.

== Semi-finals ==
Team 1	Agg.	Team 2	1st leg	2nd leg
ASEC Mimosas (Ivory Coast)	3–3	(Ghana) Asante Kotoko	3–1	0–2
Zamalek (Egypt)	3–2	(Nigeria) Stationery Stores	3–1	0–1

== Final ==
28 November 1993
--:-- UTC+0

Asante Kotoko (Ghana)	0–0	(Egypt) Zamalek

Kumasi Sports Stadium
Referee: Petros Mathabela (South Africa)
10 December 1993
--:-- UTC+1

Zamalek (Egypt)	0–0	(Ghana) Asante Kotoko
Penalties
El-Ghandour (penalty missed); Nssar (penalty scored); Abdel-Latif (penalty scored); Amuneke (penalty scored); Ibrahim (penalty scored); El-Sheshini (penalty scored); I. Youssef (penalty missed); Mansour (penalty scored); A. Youssef (penalty scored)	7 – 6	(penalty scored) Manso; (penalty scored) Gyamfi; (penalty missed) ? (penalty scored) Owusu; (penalty scored) Mensah; (penalty scored) Amankwah; (penalty missed) Agyeman-Duah; (penalty scored) Arthur; (penalty missed) Yussif

Cairo International Stadium
Referee: Neji Jouini (Tunisia)

== Champion ==
1993 African Cup of Champions Clubs Winners
(Egypt)
Zamalek
Third title

*Zamalek keep the trophy forever.

== Top scorers ==
The top scorers from the 1993 African Cup of Champions Clubs are as follows:

Rank	Name	Team	Goals
1	(Egypt) Ayman Mansour	(Egypt) Zamalek	5
2	(Nigeria) Ezekiel Alamu	(Nigeria) Stationery Stores	4
2	(Nigeria) Wasiu Ipaye	(Nigeria) Stationery Stores	4
4	(Cameroon) Jean Jacques Kombous	(Cameroon) RC Bafoussam	2
4	(Egypt) Khaled El Ghandour	(Egypt) Zamalek	2
4	(Palestine) Moustafa Nejm	(Egypt) Zamalek	2
4	(Ghana) Joe Okyere	(Ghana) Asante Kotoko	2
4	(Nigeria) Emmanuel Amunike	(Egypt) Zamalek	2
4	(Madagascar) Fidy Rasoanaivo	(Mauritius) Sunrise Flacq United	2
4	(Morocco) Ahmed Bahja	(Morocco) Kawkab Marrakech	2
4	(South Africa) Doctor Khumalo	(South Africa) Kaizer Chiefs	2
