= 2020–21 Misr Lel Makkasa SC season =

Misr Lel Makkasa SC
2020–21 season
- Manager: Mohamed Azima (from 25 March)
- Stadium: Cairo Military Academy Stadium
- Egyptian Premier League: 11th
- Egypt Cup: Quarter-finals
- Top goalscorer: League: Basem Morsy (10); All: Basem Morsy (10)

The 2020–21 season was the 34th season in the history of the Misr Lel Makkasa SC, and the club's 11th consecutive season in the Egyptian Premier League. In addition to the domestic league, the team participated in the Egypt Cup.

== Squad ==
Note: Flags indicate national team as defined under FIFA eligibility rules; some limited exceptions apply. Players may hold more than one non-FIFA nationality.

No.	Pos.	Nation	Player
—	GK	(Egypt) EGY	Mohamed Koko
—	DF	(Egypt) EGY	Mody
—	DF	(Egypt) EGY	Mohamed Desouki
—	DF	(Egypt) EGY	Hesham Hafez
—	DF	(Egypt) EGY	Ibrahim Aboul-Yazid
—	DF	(Egypt) EGY	Bassam Howiedy
—	DF	(Egypt) EGY	Taha Gomaa
—	DF	(Egypt) EGY	Asem Said
—	DF	(Egypt) EGY	Hosny Fathi
—	MF	(Egypt) EGY	Hesham Mohamed
—	MF	(Egypt) EGY	Abdallah Magdy
—	MF	(Egypt) EGY	Mostafa Shebeita
—	MF	(Egypt) EGY	Emad Fathi
—	MF	(Egypt) EGY	Ahmed Rafat

No.	Pos.	Nation	Player
—	MF	(Egypt) EGY	Hossam Hassan
—	MF	(Egypt) EGY	Riga
—	MF	(Egypt) EGY	Said El Wensh
—	MF	(Egypt) EGY	Mohamed Kamal
—	MF	(Egypt) EGY	Ahmed Sudany
—	MF	(Egypt) EGY	Salah Ashour
—	MF	(Madagascar) MAD	Paulin Voavy
—	MF	(Egypt) EGY	Ahmed Adel
—	MF	(Uganda) UGA	Khalid Aucho
—	FW	(Egypt) EGY	Marwan Hamdi
—	FW	(Egypt) EGY	Mahmoud Fahmi
—	FW	(Egypt) EGY	Basem Morsy

== Friendlies ==
5 December 2020 Friendly	Ismaily (Egypt)	3–2	(Egypt) Misr Lel Makkasa	Ismailia
				Stadium: Ismailia Stadium

9 December 2020 Friendly	Misr Lel Makkasa (Egypt)	1–2	(Libya) Al-Ahly Benghazi	Cairo

14 December 2020 Friendly	Coca-Cola FC (Egypt)	0–0	(Egypt) Misr Lel Makkasa

== Competitions ==
=== Overall record ===
Competition	First match	Last match	Starting round	Final position	Record							
Competition	First match	Last match	Starting round	Final position	Pld	W	D	L	GF	GA	GD	Win %
Egyptian Premier League	13 December 2020		Matchday 1	11th	34	10	8	16	37	55	−18	29.41
Egypt Cup	23 February 2021	22 June 2021	Round of 32	Quarter-finals	3	2	0	1	4	3	+1	66.67
Total					37	12	8	17	41	58	−17	32.43

Source: Competitions

=== Egyptian Premier League ===
==== League table ====
Pos	Team	Pld	W	D	L	GF	GA	GD	Pts
11	Ismaily (Note: Ismaily were deducted 3 points.)	34	10	11	13	42	44	−2	38
12	El Gouna	34	8	14	12	36	41	−5	38
13	Misr Lel Makkasa	34	10	8	16	36	54	−18	38
14	National Bank of Egypt	34	6	17	11	39	44	−5	35
15	Ghazl El Mahalla	34	7	14	13	28	41	−13	35

Source: Soccerway
Rules for classification: 1) Points; 2) Head-to-Head points; 3) Head-to-Head goal difference; 4) Head-to-Head goals scored; 5) Head-to-Head away goals scored; 6) Goal difference; 7) Goals scored.
(Note: Head-to-head record is used only after all the matches between the teams in question have been played).

==== Results summary ====
Overall								Home						Away					
Pld	W	D	L	GF	GA	GD	Pts	W	D	L	GF	GA	GD	W	D	L	GF	GA	GD
0	0	0	0	0	0	0	0	0	0	0	0	0	0	0	0	0	0	0	0

==== Results by round ====
Round	1	2	3	4	5	6	7	8	9	10	11	12
Ground	A	H	A	H	A	H	H	A	H	A	H	A
Result	L	L	W	D	L	W	W	W	L	L	W	D
Position												

A = Away; H = Home; W = Win; D = Draw; L = Loss

==== Matches ====
The match schedule was released on 23 November 2020.

13 December 2020 1	Al Ahly SC	3–1	Misr Lel Makkasa	Cairo
				Stadium: Al Salam Stadium

18 December 2020 2	Misr Lel Makkasa	0–1	ENPPI	Cairo
				Stadium: Osman Ahmed Osman Stadium

22 December 2020 3	Tala'ea El Gaish	1–2	Misr Lel Makkasa	Cairo
				Stadium: Gehaz El Reyada Stadium

26 December 2020 4	Misr Lel Makkasa	1–1	Al Masry	Alexandria
				Stadium: Borg El Arab Stadium

30 December 2020 5	El Gouna	1–0	Misr Lel Makkasa	El Gouna
				Stadium: Khaled Bichara Stadium

3 January 2021 7	Misr Lel Makkasa	3–1	Ismaily	Cairo
				Stadium: Osman Ahmed Osman Stadium

9 January 2021 6	Misr Lel Makkasa	1–0	Aswan	Cairo
				Stadium: Osman Ahmed Osman Stadium

18 January 2021 8	Ghazl El Mahalla	1–2	Misr Lel Makkasa	El Mahalla El Kubra
				Stadium: Ghazl El Mahalla Stadium

28 January 2021 10	Zamalek	4–1	Misr Lel Makkasa	Cairo
				Stadium: Petrosport Stadium

3 February 2021 9	Misr Lel Makkasa	0–4	Al Ittihad	Cairo
				Stadium: Osman Ahmed Osman Stadium

8 February 2021 12	Ceramica Cleopatra	1–1	Misr Lel Makkasa	Suez
				Stadium: Suez Stadium

20 February 2021 11	Misr Lel Makkasa	3–1	Wadi Degla	Cairo
				Stadium: Osman Ahmed Osman Stadium

=== Egypt Cup ===
23 February 2021 Round of 32	Misr Lel Makkasa	2–0	Ashmoun

20 April 2021 Round of 16	Misr Lel Makkasa	2–1	Ceramica Cleopatra

22 June 2021 Round of 16	Zamalek	2–0	Misr Lel Makkasa	Suez
19:00 UTC+2	Obama 57', 61'			Stadium: Suez Stadium; Referee: Ahmed Al-Ghandour
