= 1994 CAF Super Cup =

| Zamalek | Al-Ahly |
| (Egypt) | (Egypt) |
| 1 | 0 |
- Date: 16 January 1994
- Venue: First National Bank Stadium, Johannesburg
- Referee: Petros Mathabela (South Africa)
- Attendance: 12,000

The 1994 CAF Super Cup was the second CAF Super Cup, an annual football match in Africa organized by the Confederation of African Football (CAF), between the winners of the previous season's two CAF club competitions, the African Cup of Champions Clubs and the African Cup Winners' Cup.

The match took place on 16 January 1994, on neutral stadium at First National Bank Stadium in Johannesburg, South Africa, between Egyptian clubs Zamalek, the 1993 African Cup of Champions Clubs winner, and Al-Ahly, the 1993 African Cup Winners' Cup winner. In the first all-Egyptian CAF Super Cup. Zamalek won the match 1–0 with the late goal from Ayman Mansour. This game was the first continental encounter between two Egyptian clubs, named by the media as the African Game of the 20th Century.

== Teams ==
| Team | Qualification | Previous participation (bold indicates winners) |
|---|---|---|
| (Egypt) Zamalek | 1993 African Cup of Champions Clubs winner | None |
| (Egypt) Al-Ahly | 1993 African Cup Winners' Cup winner | None |

== Match details ==
16 January 1994

| Zamalek (Egypt) | 1–0 | (Egypt) Al-Ahly |
|---|---|---|
| Mansour 86' | Report |

First National Bank Stadium
Attendance: 12,000
Referee: Petros Mathabela (South Africa)

| **Zamalek** | **Al-Ahly** |

GK | (Egypt) Hussein El-Sayed
RB | (Egypt) Hussein Abdel-Latif | (substituted off) 9'
CB | (Egypt) Sami El-Sheshini
CB | (Egypt) Hesham Yakan
LB | (Egypt) Talaat Mansour
CM | (Egypt) Ashraf Youssef | (yellow card) 32'
CM | **7** | (Egypt) Ismail Youssef | (yellow card) 10'
RW | (Egypt) Effat Nssar | (yellow card) 38'
AM | (Egypt) Khaled El-Ghandour
FW | **16** | (Egypt) Ayman Mansour
FW | (Nigeria) Emmanuel Amuneke | (yellow card) 47'
Substitutions:
DF | (Egypt) Essam Marei | (substituted on) 9'
Manager:
(Egypt) Mahmoud El-Gohary

| GK | **1** | (Egypt) Ahmed Shobair |
| RB | **2** | (Egypt) Ibrahim Hassan |
| CB | | (Egypt) Amr El-Hadidy |
| CB | | (Egypt) Alaa Abdel Sadek | (yellow card) 24' |
| LB | | (Egypt) Mahmoud Aboul-Dahab |
| CM | | (Egypt) Mohamed Youssef | (red card) 80' |
| CM | | (Egypt) Reda Abdel-Aal |
| RW | | (Egypt) Mohamed Abdel Galil | | (substituted off) 59' |
| AM | | (Egypt) Hadi Khashaba |
| LW | | (Egypt) Yasser Rayyan | | (substituted off) 75' |
| CF | **9** | (Egypt) Hossam Hassan |
Substitutions:
| MF | | (Egypt) Adel Abdelrahman | | (substituted on) 59' |
| FW | | (Egypt) Mohamed Ramadan | | (substituted on) 75' |
Manager:
(England) Allan Harris

Man of the Match:

Assistant referees:

Fourth official:

== See also ==
- 2024 CAF Super Cup
