= Cairo derby =

Rivalry between Egyptian association football clubs

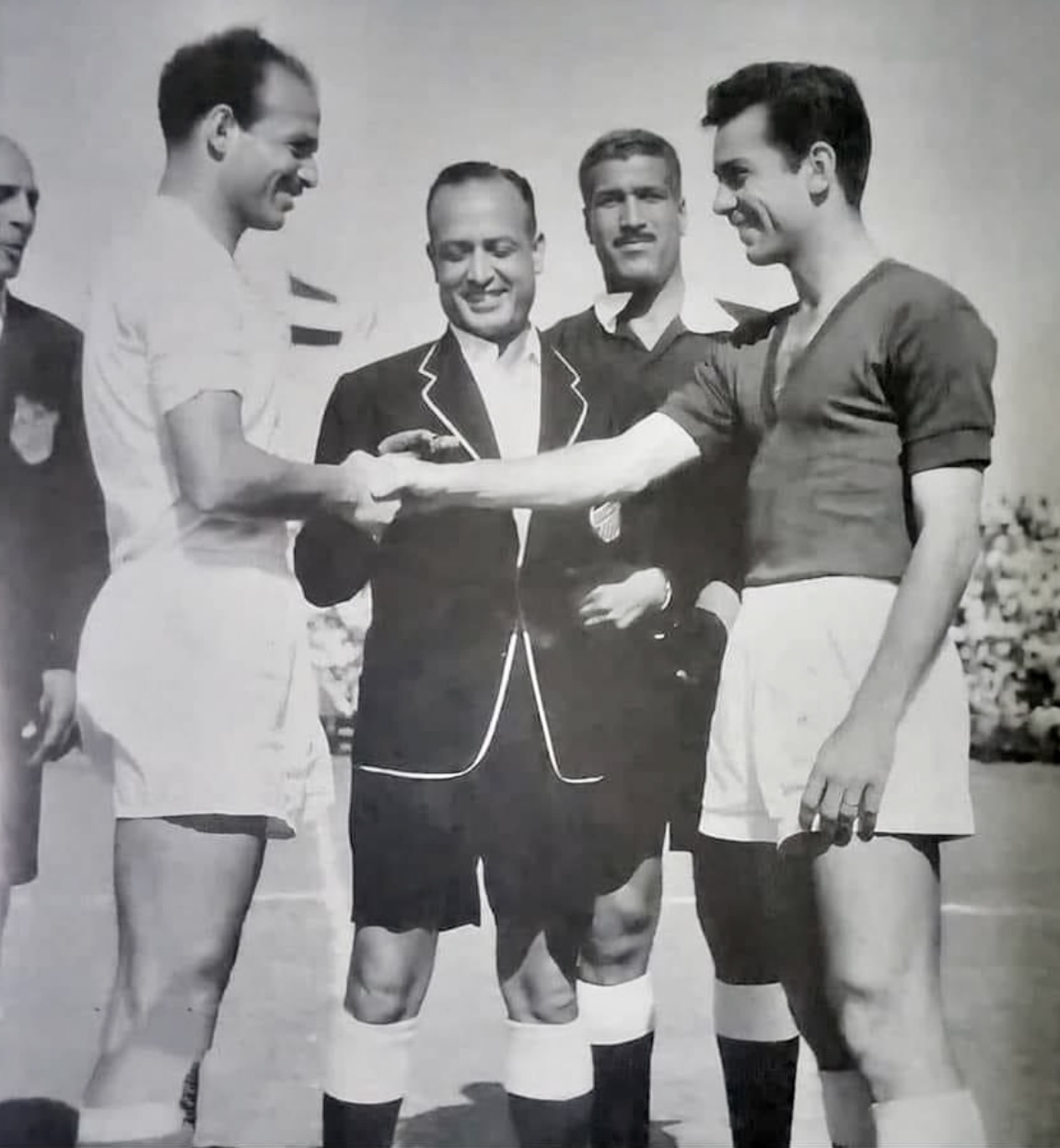
- Al Ahly's captain Saleh Selim and Zamalek's captain Nour El-Dali shaking hands before the 1959 Egypt Cup final on 24 April 1959
- Other names: Arab Classico; Top Match
- Location: Egypt
- Teams: Al Ahly; Zamalek
- First meeting: 9 February 1917; Friendly; Al Ahly 1–0 Zamalek
- Latest meeting: 9 November 2025; Egyptian Super Cup; Al Ahly 2–0 Zamalek
- Stadiums: Cairo International Stadium; Borg El Arab Stadium

Statistics
- Total meetings: 233 (official matches)
- Most wins: Al Ahly (113)
- Most player appearances: Hossam Ashour (34)
- Top scorer: Abdel-Karim Sakr (19)
- All-time series: Al Ahly: 113; Drawn: 79; Zamalek: 62
- Largest victory: Zamalek 6–0 Al Ahly (2 January 1942); 1941–42 Cairo League; Zamalek 6–0 Al Ahly (2 June 1944); 1943–44 Egypt Cup

The Cairo derby (Egyptian Arabic: ديربي القاهرة) or the Top Match (Egyptian Arabic: مباراة القمة), known as the Arab Classico (Egyptian Arabic: كلاسيكو العرب) is a rivalry between Egyptian football clubs Al Ahly and Zamalek, arguably the two most successful clubs in Egypt and Africa. Al Ahly and Zamalek were named by the CAF as the 1st and 2nd African clubs of the 20th century respectively. It is considered one of the fiercest sports encounters, and its matches attract a large audience. This match is known for its intensity since 1917 until today.

Both teams are located in Greater Cairo and their matches are considered the highlight of the football season with a live broadcast to most of the Middle Eastern and North African countries since the 1970s. Usually the derby is played twice each season with 2 matches in the Egyptian Premier League, but it is not uncommon to find the teams meeting each other in the Egypt Cup, especially in the final, and in Africa's most prestigious club competition, the CAF Champions League. The best-attended football match between Al-Ahly and Zamalek in Cairo attracted a crowd of 120,000.

== The rivalry ==
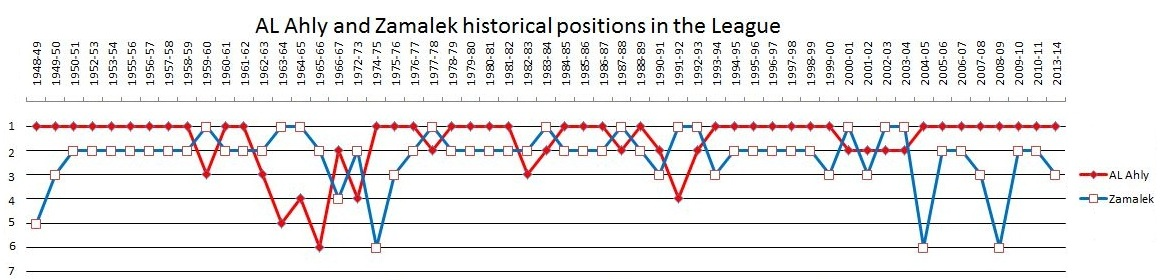
Al Ahly and Zamalek's historical positions in the league

Ever since their creation, both clubs have been the top clubs in the Egyptian Premier League, the country's top-flight football league. Also, it was chosen one of the five of the toughest derbies in the world according by the BBC.

On 9 February 1917, the first match between Zamalek and Al Ahly took place at Zamalek Stadium, ending with Al Ahly defeating Zamalek by a score of 1–0, with the goal scored by Abdel Hamid Moharram. They met again 21 days later, on 2 March 1917, at Al Ahly Stadium, and Zamalek defeated Al Ahly by a score of 1–0, with the goal scored by Ali El-Hassani.

In the first half of the 20th century. Initially, in the original league, Al Ahly and Zamalek won almost the same amount of trophies in the Cairo League, with Al Ahly winning 15 titles and Zamalek winning 14 titles. In the newly launched Egyptian Premier League in 1948, Al Ahly has proven to be the better team in every aspect of the game and even off the field management wise; Al Ahly won their first league title in the 1948–49 season and won 44 league titles after that. Zamalek managed to win the league 14 times.

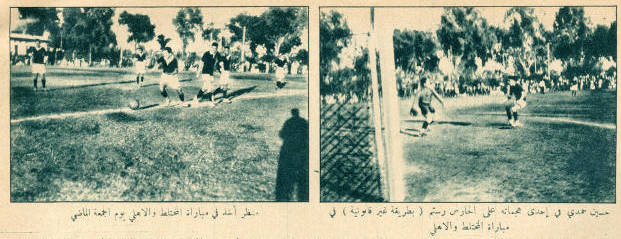
Cairo derby ending with a 3–0 victory for Zamalek on 30 November 1928

On 5 January 1923, Zamalek met Al Ahly in a friendly contest, the match ended by a victory for Zamalek by a score of 5–0, goals scored by Ali Riadh, Hussein Hegazi and Sadek Fahmy (three goals), Fahmy was the first player to score a hat-trick in the history of the derby, but in a friendly match. In the Sultan Hussein Cup, Zamalek and Al Ahly had never met in the final, however, they played six matches. The first match was in the 1924 Sultan Hussein Cup's semifinal on 17 March 1924, the match finished in a 1–1 draw, in the rematch on 21 March, Zamalek won 2–0 and advanced to the final. One of the unforgettable matches in the history of the Sultan Hussein Cup was the 1930 derby, despite that the two belligerents failed to win this season's title, the match was of a high level of intensity and had much media attention. Zamalek faced Al Ahly in a purely Egyptian contest, in which Zamalek knocked Al Ahly out of the competition, after defeating them with a score of 3–1 in the semi-finals. Zamalek's goals were scored by Mohamed Latif and Mostafa Taha (two goals), while Al Ahly's goal was scored by Mahmoud Mokhtar El Tetsh.

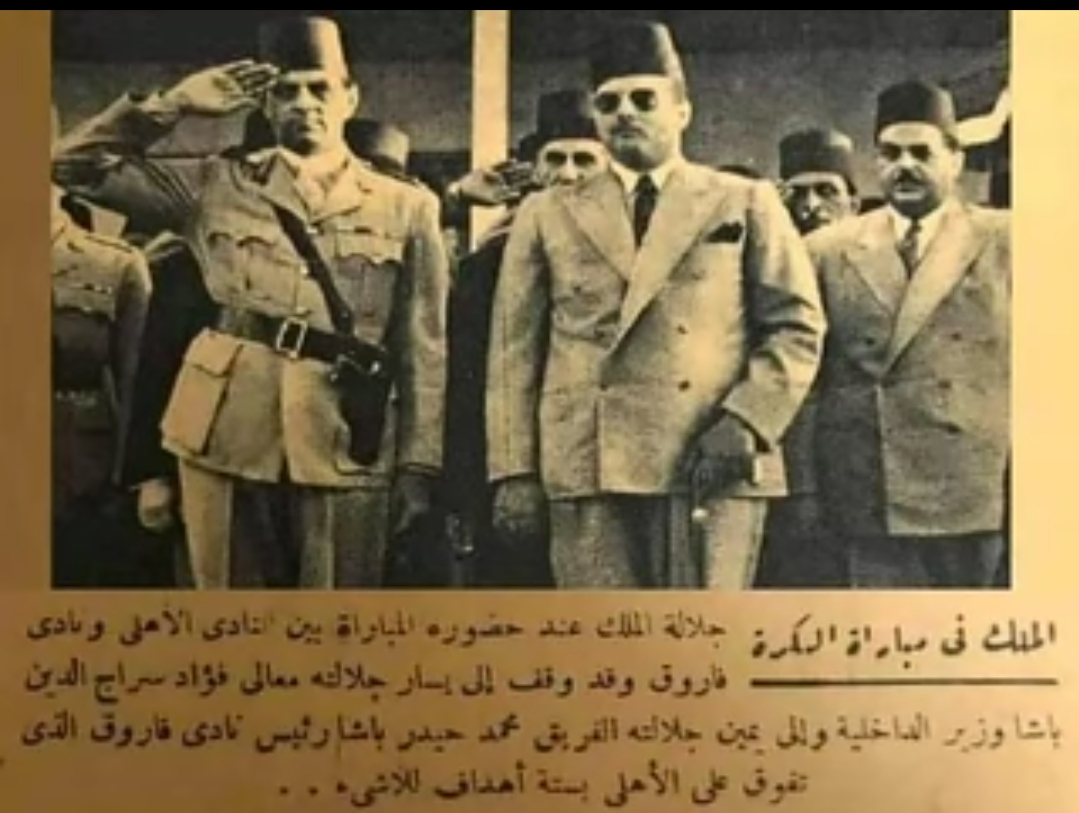
King Farouk, Mohammed Haidar Pasha (left) and Fouad Serageddin Pasha attending Cairo Derby in the 1944 Egypt Cup final, ended with the largest win in the history of the derby with a 6–0 win for Zamalek, 2 June 1944

The largest winning margin in this derby was 6–0 for Zamalek, which has been achieved 2 times. The first time was the 1942 Cairo Derby on January 2, 1942, in the 1941–42 Cairo League, and the second time was on June 2, 1944, when Zamalek was known as Farouk back then, at the 1944 Egypt Cup Final.

In the first season of the Egyptian Premier League, the first derby took place on 10 September 1948, and the belligerents finished in a draw by a score of 2–2. The second leg finished with a 1–0 win for Zamalek. In the Egypt Cup, they met in the 1952 Egypt Cup final, Zamalek won Al Ahly 2–0, the next year Al Ahly won Zamalek 4–1. In 1959 Egypt Cup final, Zamalek won Al Ahly by a score of 2–1.

The longest unbeaten streak in the history of the derby was eleven years, Al Ahly didn't beat Zamalek in an official match from 20 April 1962 to 30 March 1973. However, Al Ahly has the longest winning streaks, especially in the league.

Fans of both clubs can be violent when in anger, such as a match in the 1971–1972 season, which had crowd violence and caused the rest of the season to be called off. Numerous fights, injuries, and deaths have been reported before matters became more controlled due to Egypt's authoritarian regime. Yet many fights and riots still occur after derby matches between both sets of fans, leading the government to post even higher numbers of Central Security Forces troops in the stadium during the derby. The number of fights have increased with the increasing popularity of the "ultras" movement.

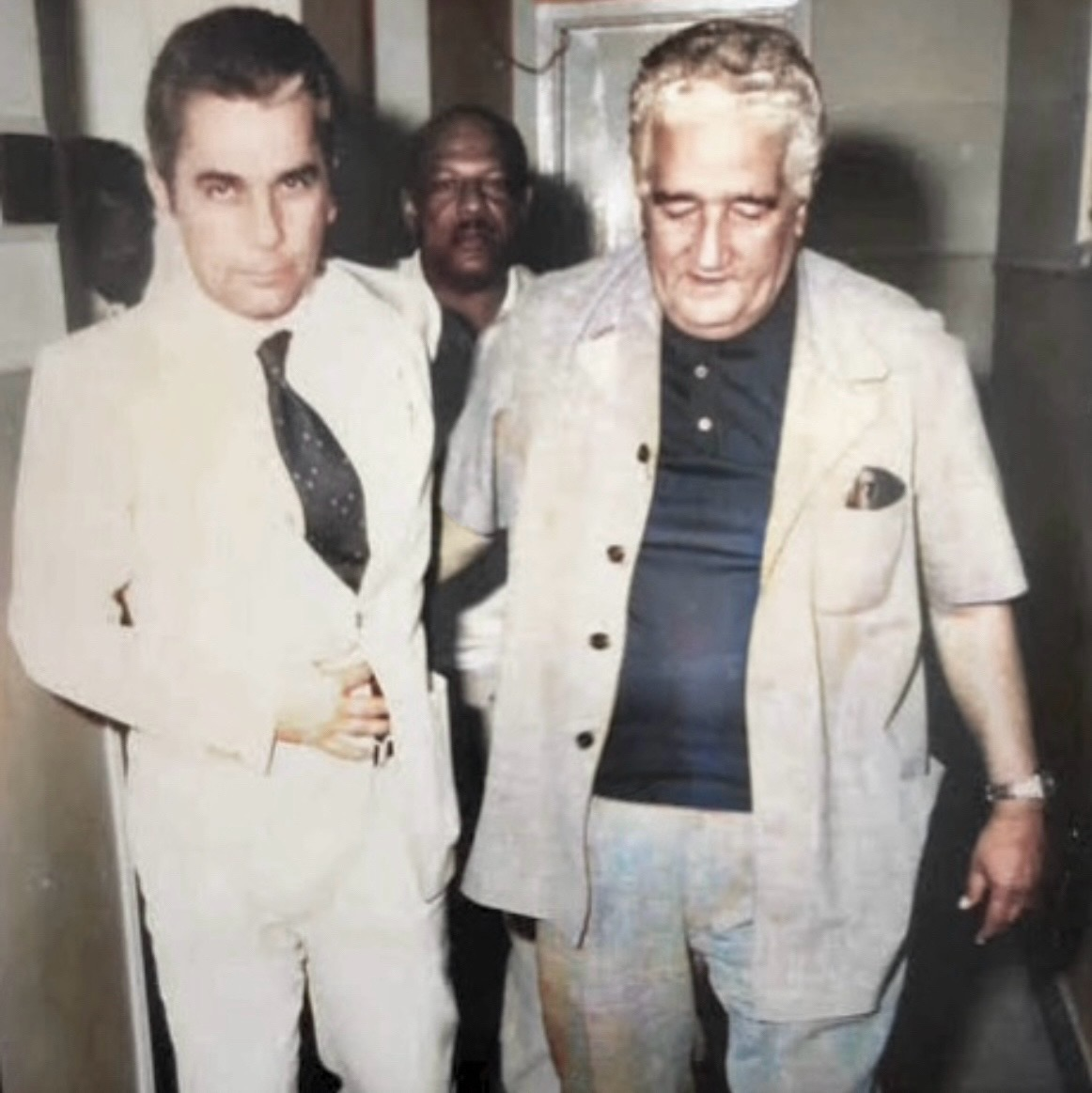
Zamalek's president Helmy Zamora receiving Al Ahly's president Saleh Selim at Zamalek's headquarters in 1980

After Zamalek won the 1993 African Cup of Champions Clubs and Al Ahly won the 1993 African Cup Winners' Cup. The CAF Super Cup presented the first continental match between two Egyptian clubs. The match took place on 16 January 1994, at the FNB Stadium in Johannesburg, South Africa. Zamalek won by a score of 1–0, goal was scored by Ayman Mansour. Zamalek won the 1994 CAF Super Cup for the first time for an Egyptian team and in the 2nd edition of the new tournament.

Non-Egyptian referees are often flown in to officiate the derby to ensure impartiality. In 2008, World Soccer Magazine selected the Cairo Derby as the 10th most fierce derby in the world. Besides the estimated 50 million domestic TV audience, the game is huge all over North Africa, the Middle East and the entire world. On 24 February 2020, Zamalek forfeited a league match against Al Ahly, a few days after their match at the 2019–20 Egyptian Super Cup.

On 5 November 2020, Zamalek overcame Raja Casablanca 4–1 in the second leg of the 2019–20 CAF Champions League semi-finals, and set up the historic final with Al-Ahly, marking the first time ever in their history that the two clubs faced each other in the final of an international competition. The single-leg final was played on 27 November 2020, and Al-Ahly won the match 2–1, earning a competition record ninth Champions League title.

== The Meetings ==
=== Key ===
Colors

Al Ahly win
Draw
Zamalek win

=== League ===
These are the meetings in the Egyptian Premier League

Season	Home team	Result	Away team
1948–49	Zamalek	2–2	Al Ahly
1948–49	Al Ahly	0–1	Zamalek
1949–50	Zamalek	0–0	Al Ahly
1949–50	Al Ahly	2–0	Zamalek
1950–51	Zamalek	0–2	Al Ahly
1950–51	Al Ahly	3–0	Zamalek
1951–52	No matches due to Egyptian Revolution of 1952		
1952–53	Zamalek	2–2	Al Ahly
1952–53	Al Ahly	0–0	Zamalek
1953–54	Zamalek	1–1	Al Ahly
1953–54	Al Ahly	4–2	Zamalek
1954–55	Zamalek	1–1	Al Ahly
1954–55	Al Ahly	2–0	Zamalek
1955–56	Zamalek	2–1	Al Ahly
1955–56	Al Ahly	2–2	Zamalek
1956–57	Zamalek	0–2	Al Ahly
1956–57	Al Ahly	1–1	Zamalek
1957–58	Zamalek	1–1	Al Ahly
1957–58	Al Ahly	3–1	Zamalek
1958–59	Zamalek	1–1	Al Ahly
1958–59	Al Ahly	2–0	Zamalek
1959–60	Zamalek	2–1	Al Ahly
1959–60	Al Ahly	2–1	Zamalek
1960–61	Zamalek	1–4	Al Ahly
1960–61	Al Ahly	1–3	Zamalek
1961–62	Zamalek	0–3	Al Ahly
1961–62	Al Ahly	3–0	Zamalek
1962–63	Zamalek	1–1	Al Ahly
1962–63	No away match due to one leg championship play-off		
1963–64	No matches because they were in separate groups in the League		
1964–65	Zamalek	2–1	Al Ahly
1964–65	Al Ahly	2–2	Zamalek
1965–66	Zamalek	2–0	Al Ahly
1965–66	Al Ahly	2–2	Zamalek
1966–67	Zamalek	1–1	Al Ahly
1966–67	Al Ahly	0–1	Zamalek
1967–68	No matches due to Six-Day War & War of Attrition		
1968–69	No matches due to Six-Day War & War of Attrition		
1969–70	No matches due to Six-Day War & War of Attrition		
1970–71	No matches due to Six-Day War & War of Attrition		
1971–72	Zamalek	2–1	Al Ahly
1971–72	No away match due to crowd violence in the first match		
1972–73	Al Ahly	1–1	Zamalek
1972–73	Zamalek	0–1	Al Ahly
1973–74	No matches due to October War		
1974–75	Zamalek	1–2	Al Ahly
1974–75	Al Ahly	0–0	Zamalek
1975–76	No matches because they were in separate groups in the League		
1976–77	Zamalek	0–0	Al Ahly
1976–77	Al Ahly	2–1	Zamalek
1977–78	Zamalek	0–1	Al Ahly
1977–78	Al Ahly	0–0	Zamalek
1978–79	Zamalek	1–1	Al Ahly
1978–79	Al Ahly	1–1	Zamalek
1979–80	Zamalek	1–2	Al Ahly
1979–80	Al Ahly	0–0	Zamalek
1980–81	Zamalek	0–0	Al Ahly
1980–81	Al Ahly	0–2	Zamalek
1981–82	Zamalek	0–0	Al Ahly
1981–82	Al Ahly	1–1	Zamalek
1982–83	Zamalek	1–1	Al Ahly
1982–83	Al Ahly	1–0	Zamalek
1983–84	Zamalek	2–2	Al Ahly
1983–84	Al Ahly	0–1	Zamalek
1984–85	Zamalek	2–1	Al Ahly
1984–85	Al Ahly	1–0	Zamalek
1985–86	Zamalek	1–1	Al Ahly
1985–86	Al Ahly	2–2	Zamalek
1986–87	Zamalek	1–0	Al Ahly
1986–87	Al Ahly	2–1	Zamalek
1987–88	Zamalek	2–1	Al Ahly
1987–88	Al Ahly	1–1	Zamalek
1988–89	Zamalek	0–0	Al Ahly
1988–89	Al Ahly	1–0	Zamalek
1989–90	Zamalek	0–0	Al Ahly
1989–90	No away match due to 1990 World Cup preparations		
1990–91	Zamalek	0–1	Al Ahly
1990–91	Al Ahly	0–2	Zamalek
1991–92	Zamalek	0–1	Al Ahly
1991–92	Al Ahly	0–1	Zamalek
1992–93	Zamalek	1–0	Al Ahly
1992–93	Al Ahly	0–1	Zamalek
1993–94	Zamalek	0–3	Al Ahly
1993–94	Al Ahly	0–2	Zamalek
1994–95	Zamalek	1–1	Al Ahly
1994–95	Al Ahly	0–0	Zamalek
1995–96	Al Ahly	2–0	Zamalek
1995–96	Zamalek	0–0	Al Ahly
1996–97	Zamalek	1–3	Al Ahly
1996–97	Al Ahly	0–0	Zamalek
1997–98	Zamalek	0–2	Al Ahly
1997–98	Al Ahly	0–0	Zamalek
1998–99	Zamalek	1–2	Al Ahly
1998–99	Al Ahly	2–0	Zamalek
1999–2000	Al Ahly	1–2	Zamalek
1999–2000	Zamalek	0–0	Al Ahly
2000–01	Zamalek	1–1	Al Ahly
2000–01	Al Ahly	1–3	Zamalek
2001–02	Zamalek	2–1	Al Ahly
2001–02	Al Ahly	6–1	Zamalek
2002–03	Zamalek	3–1	Al Ahly
2002–03	Al Ahly	2–2	Zamalek
2003–04	Al Ahly	1–2	Zamalek
2003–04	Zamalek	1–0	Al Ahly
2004–05	Zamalek	2–4	Al Ahly
2004–05	Al Ahly	3–0	Zamalek
2005–06	Zamalek	0–2	Al Ahly
2005–06	Al Ahly	0–0	Zamalek
2006–07	Zamalek	1–2	Al Ahly
2006–07	Al Ahly	0–2	Zamalek
2007–08	Zamalek	0–1	Al Ahly
2007–08	Al Ahly	2–0	Zamalek
2008–09	Zamalek	0–0	Al Ahly
2008–09	Al Ahly	1–0	Zamalek
2009–10	Zamalek	3–3	Al Ahly
2009–10	Al Ahly	0–0	Zamalek
2010–11	Zamalek	2–2	Al Ahly
2010–11	Al Ahly	0–0	Zamalek
2011–12	No matches due to Port Said Stadium riot		
2012–13	No matches due to June 2013 Egyptian protests		
2013–14	Zamalek	0–1	Al Ahly
2013–14	No away match due to one leg championship play-off		
2014–15	Zamalek	1–1	Al Ahly
2014–15	Al Ahly	2–0	Zamalek
2015–16	Zamalek	0–0	Al Ahly
2015–16	Al Ahly	2–0	Zamalek
2016–17	Zamalek	0–2	Al Ahly
2016–17	Al Ahly	2–0	Zamalek
2017–18	Zamalek	0–3	Al Ahly
2017–18	Al Ahly	1–2	Zamalek
2018–19	Zamalek	0–0	Al Ahly
2018–19	Al Ahly	1–0	Zamalek
2019–20	Al Ahly	2–0 (Note: Match awarded)	Zamalek
2019–20	Zamalek	3–1	Al Ahly
2020–21	Al Ahly	2–1	Zamalek
2020–21	Al Ahly	1–1	Zamalek
2021–22	Zamalek	3–5	Al Ahly
2021–22	Al Ahly	2–2	Zamalek
2022–23	Zamalek	0–3	Al Ahly
2022–23	Al Ahly	4–1	Zamalek
2023–24	Zamalek	2–1	Al Ahly
2023–24	Al Ahly	2–0	Zamalek
2024–25	Al Ahly	1–1	Zamalek
2024–25	Zamalek	3–0	Al Ahly
2025–26	Al Ahly	2–1	Zamalek
2025–26	Zamalek	0–3	Al Ahly

Al Ahly wins	Draws	Zamalek wins
52	51	29

=== Egypt Cup ===
These are the meetings in the Egypt Cup

Season	Round	Home team	Score	Away team
1927–28	Final	Zamalek	0–1	Al Ahly
1928–29	Quarter Final	Zamalek	0–1	Al Ahly
1930–31	Final	Zamalek	1–4	Al Ahly
1931–32	Final	Zamalek	2–1	Al Ahly
1932–33	Semi-Final	Al Ahly	3–1	Zamalek
1933–34	Semi-Final	Zamalek	3–0	Al Ahly
1934–35	Final	Zamalek	3–0	Al Ahly
1936–37	Quarter Final	Zamalek	1–1	Al Ahly
1936–37	Quarter Final Replay	Zamalek	2–2	Al Ahly
1936–37	Quarter Final Replay	Zamalek	0–5	Al Ahly
1937–38	Final	Zamalek	1–1	Al Ahly
1937–38	Final Replay	Zamalek	1–0	Al Ahly
1941–42	Final	Al Ahly	3–0	Zamalek
1943–44	Final	Zamalek	6–0	Al Ahly
1947–48	Semi-Final	Al Ahly	1–2	Zamalek
1948–49	Final	Zamalek	1–3	Al Ahly
1951–52	Final	Zamalek	2–0	Al Ahly
1952–53	Final	Al Ahly	4–1	Zamalek
1957–58	Final	Zamalek	0–0	Al Ahly
1957–58	Final Replay	Al Ahly	2–2	Zamalek
1958–59	Final	Zamalek	2–1	Al Ahly
1977–78	Final	Al Ahly	4–2	Zamalek
1984–85	Quarter Final	Al Ahly	3–2	Zamalek
1988–89	Quarter Final	Al Ahly	2–1	Zamalek
1990–91	Semi-Final	Al Ahly	2–0	Zamalek
1991–92	Final	Al Ahly	2–1	Zamalek
2005–06	Final	Al Ahly	3–0	Zamalek
2006–07	Final	Al Ahly	4–3	Zamalek
2009–10	Round of 16	Al Ahly	3–1	Zamalek
2014–15	Final	Zamalek	2–0	Al Ahly
2015–16	Final	Zamalek	3–1	Al Ahly
2020–21	Final	Zamalek	2–1	Al Ahly
2022–23	Final	Al Ahly	2–0	Zamalek

Al Ahly wins	Draws	Zamalek wins
17	5	11

=== Egyptian Super Cup ===
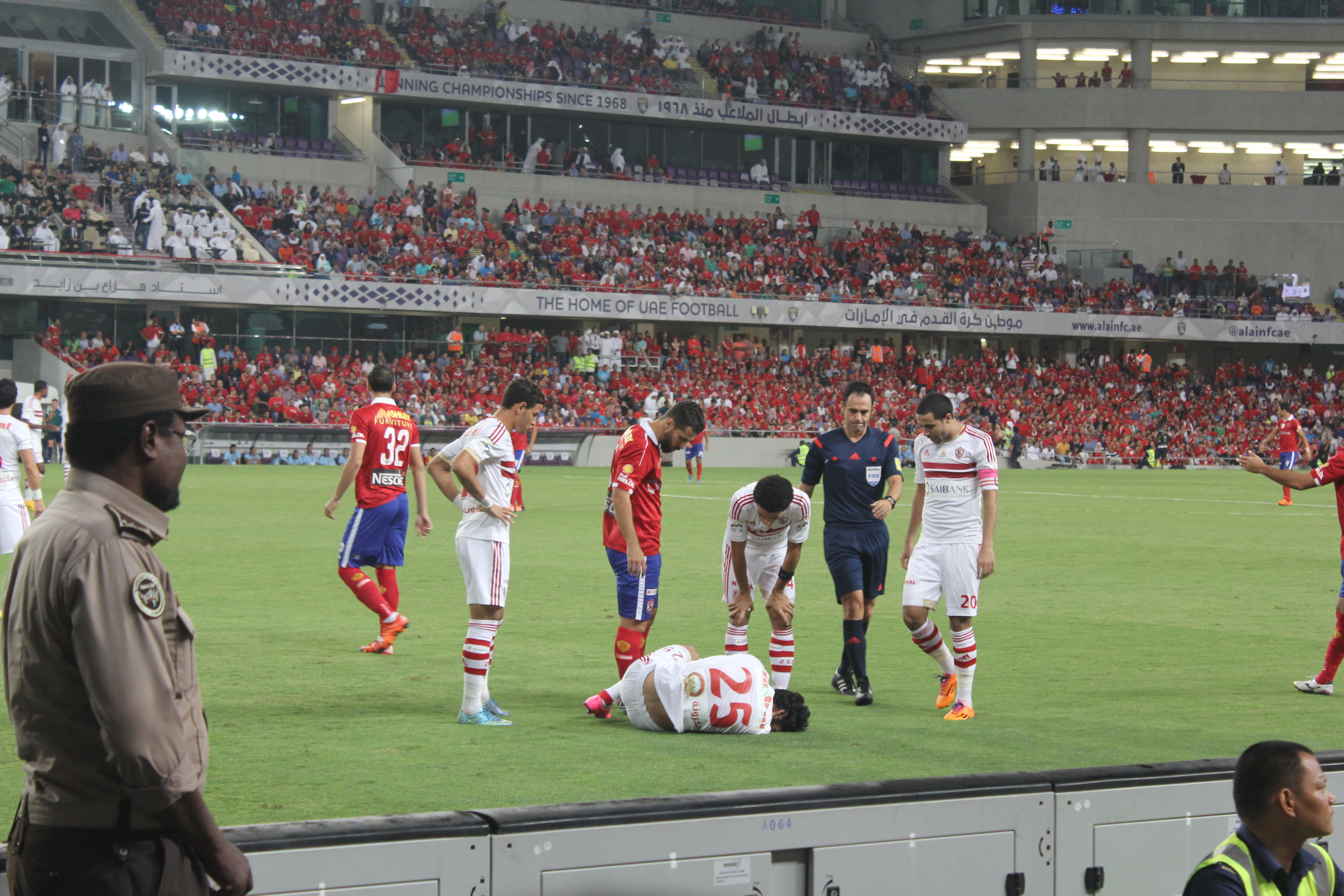
Zamalek against Al Ahly in the 2015–16 Egyptian Super Cup

These are the meetings in the Egyptian Super Cup

Date	Home team	Score	Away team
2003–04	Al Ahly	0–0 (3–1 p)	Zamalek
2008–09	Al Ahly	2–0	Zamalek
2014–15	Al Ahly	0–0 (5–4 p)	Zamalek
2015–16	Zamalek	2–3	Al Ahly
2016–17	Al Ahly	0–0 (1–3 p)	Zamalek
2018–19	Al Ahly	3–2	Zamalek
2019–20	Al Ahly	0–0 (3–4 p)	Zamalek
2021–22	Al Ahly	2–0	Zamalek
2024–25	Al Ahly	0–0 (7–6 p)	Zamalek
2025–26	Al Ahly	2–0	Zamalek

Al Ahly wins	Draws	Zamalek wins
5	5	0

=== CAF Champions League ===
These are the meetings in the CAF Champions league

Season	Round	Home team	Score	Away team
2004–05	Semi-Final	Zamalek	1–2	Al Ahly
2004–05	Semi-Final	Al Ahly	2–0	Zamalek
2007–08	Group stage	Al Ahly	2–1	Zamalek
2007–08	Group stage	Al Ahly	2–2	Zamalek
2011–12	Group stage	Zamalek	0–1	Al Ahly
2011–12	Group stage	Al Ahly	1–1	Zamalek
2012–13	Group stage	Zamalek	1–1	Al Ahly
2012–13	Group stage	Al Ahly	4–2	Zamalek
2019–20	Final	Zamalek	1–2	Al Ahly

Al Ahly wins	Draws	Zamalek wins
6	3	0

=== CAF Super Cup ===
There are two meetings in the CAF Super Cup

Season	Round	Home team	Score	Away team
1994	Final	Zamalek	1–0	Al Ahly
2024	Final	Al Ahly	1–1 (3–4 p)	Zamalek

Al Ahly wins	Draws	Zamalek wins
0	1	1

== African final meetings ==
=== 1994 CAF Super Cup ===
The first African encounter between the two Egyptian rivals took place after Zamalek won the 1993 African Cup of Champions Clubs and Al Ahly won the 1993 African Cup Winners' Cup. The CAF Super Cup presented the first encounter between the two rivals in a continental match. Zamalek were the last Egyptian League winners and Ahly were the last winners of the Egypt Cup as well. The match was highly anticipated and publicized in Africa. It took place on 16 January 1994, at the FNB Stadium in Johannesburg, South Africa, as a neutral stadium. In the 86th minute, Ayman Mansour scored Zamalek's winning goal after firing a shot from 25 yards to the right corner of the net and past Ahmed Shobair. Zamalek won the CAF Super Cup for the first time for an Egyptian team and in the 2nd edition of the new tournament.

=== Final of the Century ===
On 27 November 2020, Al Ahly and Zamalek for the first time faced off each other in the CAF Champions League final. This match is known as the African Game of the Century as the 2 greatest clubs of Africa were facing off each other for the Champions League trophy. The match was played behind closed doors of the Cairo International Stadium due to the COVID-19 pandemic that has spread around the globe rapidly. El Solia scored the first goal of the match and for Al Ahly on the 5th minute with a header while Shikabala equalized for Zamalek on the 31st minute. after 85 minutes and 45 seconds onto the game, Afsha got the winning goal for Al Ahly, controlling the ball on his knee outside the penalty area after a clearance, before volleying to the right corner of the net and past Gabaski. Al Ahly for the first time since 2013 and for the 9th in total lifted the CAF Champions League trophy, Momen Zakaria who was forced to retire from his football career due to suffering from Amyotrophic lateral sclerosis got the chance to lift the cup for Al Ahly. Al Ahly were able to defend their title in 2021 hence lifted its 10th CAF Champions League trophy.After two years, Al Ahly managed to win its 11th CAF Champions League in 2023 and were able to defend their title in 2024 to lift its 12th CAF Champions League. On the other hand Zamalek failed to qualify from the group stage in the following three tournaments 2021 tournament, 2022 tournament, 2023 tournament and failed to qualify to 2024 tournament, 2025 tournament and 2026 tournament after being third in the league ranking.

=== 2024 CAF Super Cup ===
On 27 September 2024, Zamalek and Al Ahly met for the second time in a CAF Super Cup final and a third time in a continental final encounter between the two greatest Egyptian teams. The first time was on 16 January 1994 in the 1994 CAF Super Cup which Zamalek won. This match is known as The Super of the Century, as the two greatest clubs of Africa were facing off each other for the continental title. The match was to take place between Al Ahly, the CAF Champions League winners against Zamalek, the title holders of the CAF Confederation Cup on Kingdom Arena in Riyadh, Saudi Arabia. Al Ahly scored the first goal in the first half by Wessam Abou Ali from a penalty kick on the 44th minute, a penalty kick decision which resulted of arguments from Zamalek players. In the second half and from the first touch, the 76th-minute substitute Nasser Mansi equalized for Zamalek on the 77th minute. After a dramatic penalty shootout, Zamalek won the match by a score of 4–3 on penalties. This match was considered a revenge for the 2020 CAF Champions League final which Al Ahly won. It was Zamalek's fifth title and the second time beating Al Ahly with 30 years in between the two Super Cup finals in two different centuries.

== Statistics ==
=== Matches summary ===
As of match played 1 May 2026

	Matches	Wins		Draws
	Matches	Al Ahly	Zamalek	Draws
Egyptian Premier League	132	52	29	51
Egypt Cup	33	17	11	5
Egyptian Super Cup	10	5	0	5
Sultan Hussein Cup	6	1	3	2
Cairo League	42	21	9	12
CAF Champions League	9	6	0	3
CAF Super Cup	2	0	1	1
All competitions	234	102	53	79
Exhibition games	24	11	9	4
All matches	258	113	62	83

Results of Al Ahly and Zamalek in the 21st century
Season	ASC	ZSC
2000–01	2	1
2001–02	2	3
2002–03	2	1
2003–04	2	1
2004–05	1	6
2005–06	1	2
2006–07	1	2
2007–08	1	2
2008–09	1	6
2009–10	1	2
2010–11	1	2
2012–13	1	3
2013–14	1	3
2014–15	2	1
2015–16	1	2
2016–17	1	2
2017–18	1	4
2018–19	1	2
2019–20	1	2
2020–21	2	1
2021–22	3	1
2022–23	1	3
2023–24	1	3
2024–25	1	3
2025–26	3	1
League champions	17	7
Top three	25	20
League champions Egypt Cup; League/Cup double

== Records ==
=== Players ===
==== Top scorers ====
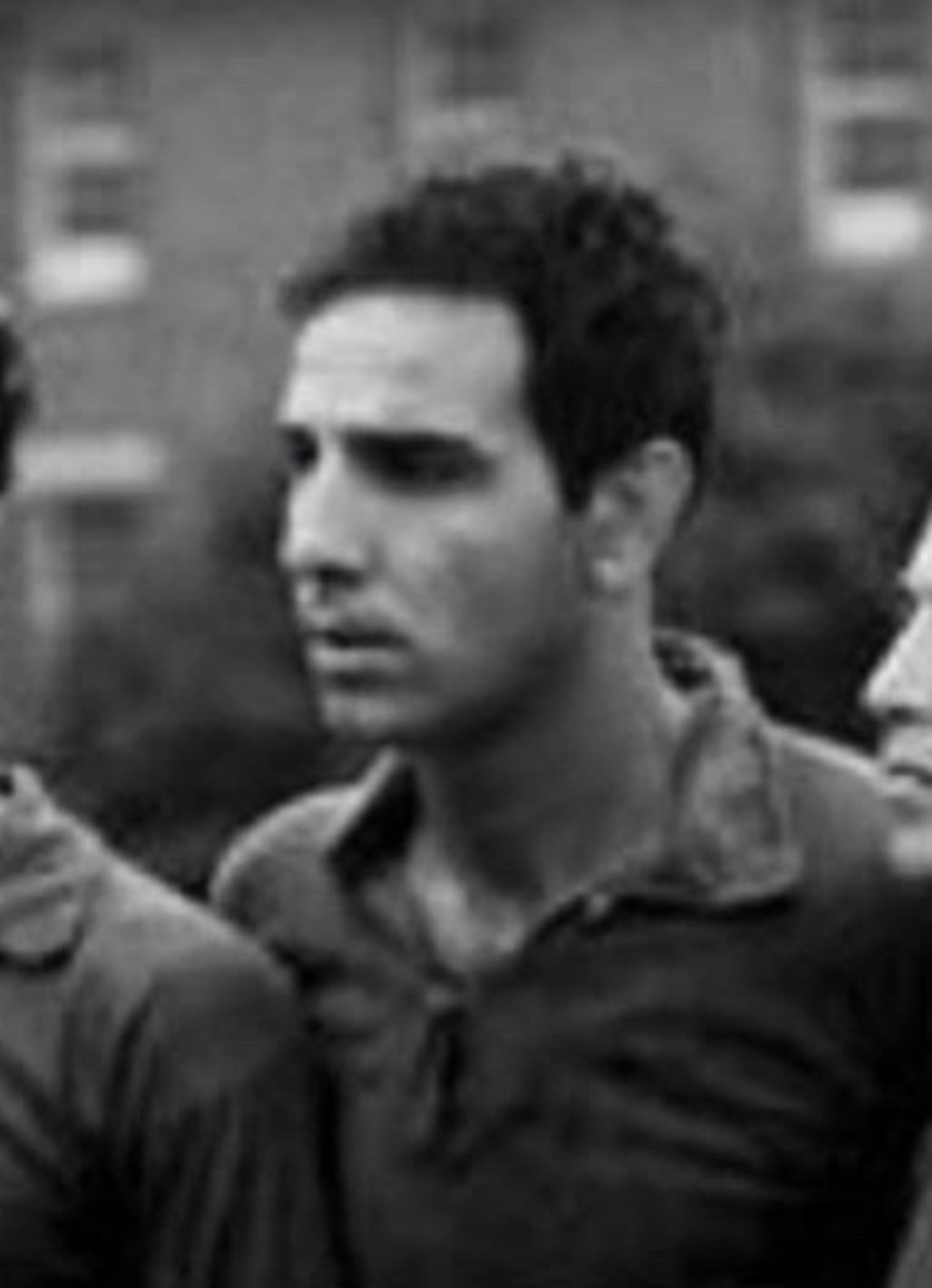
Abdel-Karim Sakr is the all-time top scorer in Cairo derby history with 19 goals.

Player	Club	Goals
(Egypt) Abdel-Karim Sakr	Zamalek (10); Al Ahly (9)	19
(Egypt) Mostafa Taha	Zamalek (12); Al Ahly (3)	15
(Egypt) Mohamed Aboutrika	Al Ahly	13
(Egypt) Mokhtar El Tetsh	Al Ahly	13
(Egypt) Ahmed Mekkawi	Al Ahly	11
(Egypt) Labib Mahmoud	Al Ahly (8); Zamalek (2)	10
(Egypt) Emad Moteab	Al Ahly	10
(Egypt) El-Sayed Ateya "Toto"	Al Ahly	10
(Egypt) Alaa El-Hamouly	Zamalek	9
(Egypt) El-Sayed El-Dhizui	Al Ahly	9
(Egypt) Hossam Hassan	Al Ahly (5); Zamalek (4)	9
(Egypt) Gamal Hamza	Zamalek	8

==== Hat-tricks ====
#	Player	For	Score	Date	Competition
1.	(Egypt) Mokhtar El Tetsh	Al Ahly	4–0	28 November 1930	Cairo League
2.	(Egypt) Abdel-Karim Sakr	Al Ahly	5–0	30 May 1937	Egypt Cup
4.	(Egypt) Zoklot	Zamalek	6–0	2 June 1944	Egypt Cup
4.	(Egypt) El Sayed Ateya "Toto"	Al Ahly	4–2	26 March 1953	Egyptian Premier League
5.	(Egypt) Khaled Bebo	Al Ahly	6–1	16 May 2002	Egyptian Premier League

== Honours ==
As of 20 May 2026

- Numbers with this background denote the competition record.

Al Ahly	Competition	Zamalek
Domestic
45	Egyptian Premier League	15
39	Egypt Cup	29
16	Egyptian Super Cup	4
7	Sultan Hussein Cup (defunct)	2
16	Cairo League (defunct)	14
0	Egyptian Friendship Cup (defunct)	1
1	United Arab Republic Cup (defunct)	0
0	October League Cup (defunct)	1
1	Egyptian Confederation Cup (defunct)	1
125	Aggregate	67
African and Worldwide
12	CAF Champions League	5
1	CAF Confederation Cup	2
8	CAF Super Cup	5
1	FIFA African-Asian-Pacific Cup	0
1	Afro-Asian Club Championship (defunct)	2
4	African Cup Winners' Cup (defunct)	1
27	Aggregate	15
UAFA and Regional competitions
1	Arab Club Champions Cup	1
0	Saudi-Egyptian Super Cup	2
1	Arab Cup Winners' Cup (defunct)	0
2	Arab Super Cup (defunct)	0
4	Aggregate	3
156	Total Aggregate	85

== Players and Managers who have played for or managed both clubs ==
Below are the players and managers who played for or managed both clubs

=== Al Ahly then Zamalek ===
Name	Position	Al Ahly	Zamalek
Name	Position	Career	Career
(Egypt) Hussein Hegazi	FW	1915–19; 1924–28	1919–24; 1928–31
(Egypt) El-Sayed Abaza	FW	1915–20; 1923–28	1920–23; 1928–30
(Egypt) Abdel-Karim Sakr	FW	1935–39	1939–53
(Egypt) Gamal Abdel-Hamid	FW	1977–82	1983–93
(Egypt) Ayman Shawky	FW	1984–94	1995–96
(Egypt) Mohamed Abdel-Galil	MF	1988–95	1995–97
(Egypt) Hossam Hassan	FW	1985–99	2000–04
(Egypt) Ibrahim Hassan	DF	1985–99	2000–04
(Ghana) Felix Aboagye	FW	1993–98	2001–02
(Egypt) Ibrahim Said	DF	1998–03	2004–06
(Egypt) Sherif Ashraf	FW	2005–07	2008–09
(Egypt) Mohamed Abdullah	DF	2005–07	2008–09
(Egypt) Hassan Mostafa	MF	2003–09	2009–11
(Qatar) Hussein Yasser	MF	2008–10	2010–11
(Egypt) Essam El Hadary	GK	1996–08	2010–11
(Egypt) Ahmed Hassan	MF	2008–11	2011–13
(Mauritania) Dominique Da Sylva	FW	2011–13	2014
(Egypt) Abdallah El-Said	MF	2011–18	2024–
(Egypt) Nasser Maher	MF	2014–21	2024–
(Egypt) Ahmed Hamdi	MF	2015–19	2024–

Name	Al Ahly	Zamalek
Name	Career	Career
(Egypt) Mahmoud El-Gohary	1982–84; 1985–86	1993–94
(Germany) Reiner Hollmann	1995–97	2008
(France) Patrice Carteron	2018	2019–20; 2021–22
(Portugal) Jose Peseiro	2015–16	2025

=== Zamalek then Al Ahly ===
Name	Position	Zamalek	Al Ahly
Name	Position	Career	Career
(Egypt) Ali El-Hassani	FW	1914–23; 1927–29; 1931–34	1924–27; 1929–31
(Egypt) Labib Mahmoud	FW	1923–31; 1940–41	1931–40
(Egypt) Reda Abdel Aal	MF	1987–93	1993–98
(Egypt) Magdy Tolba	MF	1983–89	1995–98
(Egypt) Islam El-Shater	DF	2003–04	2004–08
(Egypt) Nader El-Sayed	GK	1992–98	2005–06
(Egypt) Mohamed Sedik	DF	2002–06	2006–07
(Egypt) Tarek El-Said	MF	1998–06	2006–08
(Egypt) Moataz Eno	MF	2002–07	2007–12
(Egypt) Hany El Agazy	FW	2003–07	2008–11
(Egypt) Gamal Hamza	FW	1999–09	2010–11
(Egypt) Sabry Raheel	DF	2009–13	2013–19
(Egypt) Moamen Zakaria	MF	2013–14	2015–19
(Egypt) Ahmed Hamoudi	FW	2015–16	2017–19
(Egypt) Yasser Ibrahim	DF	2013–16	2019–
(Egypt) Kahraba	FW	2015–19	2020–25
(Egypt) Emam Ashour	MF	2019–23	2023–
(Morocco) Achraf Bencharki	FW	2019–22	2025–
(Egypt) Zizo	FW	2019–25	2025–

== See also ==
- Al Ahly–Pyramids rivalry
