= List of FIFA Arab Cup finals =

- Organiser(s): UAFA (1985–2012); FIFA (2021–present)
- Founded: 1963; 63 years ago
- Region: Arab world
- Current champions: Morocco (2nd title)
- Most championships: Iraq (4 titles)

The FIFA Arab Cup is an association football competition established in 1963. It is contested by the men's national teams of the members of the Union of Arab Football Associations (UAFA), the governing body of football for countries in the Arab world and takes place generally every four years. The winners of the first tournament were Tunisia, who won in a round-robin style tournament. The first final was in 1966, where Iraq defeated Syria 2–1 in Baghdad. The most recent final, hosted in Lusail in 2025, saw Morocco defeat Jordan 3–2 after extra time. The FIFA Arab Cup final is the last match of the competition and the result determines which country's team is declared Arab champion. As of the 2025 tournament, if after 90 minutes of regular play the score is a draw, an additional 30-minute period of extra time is added. If such a game is still tied after extra time, it is decided by penalty shoot-out. The team that wins the penalty shoot-out are then declared champions.

Iraq is the most successful team at the tournament, winning it four times. Saudi Arabia and Morocco both have two titles, Tunisia, Egypt, and Algeria each have one a-piece.

== List of finals ==
Key to the list of finals
#	Final not played
†	Final was won during extra time
*	Final decided by a penalty shootout

Tournament	Winners	Score	Runners-up	Venue	Location	Attendance	Ref.
Arab Cup
1963	Tunisia	No final	Syria	Camille Chamoun Stadium	Beirut, Lebanon	20,000	
1964	Iraq	No final	Libya	Shuwaikh High School Stadium	Kuwait City, Kuwait		
1966	Iraq	2–1	Syria	Al-Kashafa Stadium	Baghdad, Iraq	20,000	
1985	Iraq	1–0	Bahrain	King Fahd Stadium	Taif, Saudi Arabia		
1988	Iraq	1–1 (a.e.t.) (4–3 p)	Syria	Amman International Stadium	Amman, Jordan	15,000	
1992 (Note: The 1992 edition organized as part of the 1992 Arab Games football tournament was also counted as a part of the Arab Cup.)	Egypt	3–2	Saudi Arabia	Al-Hamadaniah Stadium	Aleppo, Syria		
1998	Saudi Arabia	3–1	Qatar	Khalifa International Stadium	Doha, Qatar	25,000	
2002	Saudi Arabia	1–0 (a.e.t.)	Bahrain	Al Kuwait Sports Club Stadium	Kuwait City, Kuwait	7,500	
2012	Morocco	1–1 (a.e.t.) (3–1 p)	Libya	Prince Abdullah al-Faisal Stadium	Jeddah, Saudi Arabia	2,500	
FIFA Arab Cup
2021	Algeria	2–0 (a.e.t.)	Tunisia	Al Bayt Stadium	Al Khor, Qatar	60,456	
2025	Morocco	3–2 (a.e.t.)	Jordan	Lusail Stadium	Lusail, Qatar	84,517	

== Results by nation ==
Final match venue locations

Years shown in bold indicate that the country also hosted that tournament.

Team	Winners	Runners-up	Total finals
Iraq	4 (1964, 1966*, 1985, 1988)	—	4
Saudi Arabia	2 (1998, 2002)	1 (1992)	3
Morocco	2 (2012, 2025)	—	2
Tunisia	1 (1963)	1 (2021)	2
Egypt	1 (1992)	—	1
Algeria	1 (2021)	—	1
Syria	—	3 (1963, 1966, 1988)	3
Libya	—	2 (1964, 2012)	2
Bahrain	—	2 (1985, 2002)	2
Qatar	—	1 (1998*)	1
Jordan	—	1 (2025)	1
