= Mustapha Ibrahim =

Mustapha Ibrahim might refer to:

- Mustapha Ibrahim (Nigerian footballer), Nigerian footballer
- Mustapha Ibrahim (Egyptian footballer), Egyptian footballer

== See also ==
- Mustapha (song), by Queen
