= 1992 King Fahd Cup final =

- Event: 1992 King Fahd Cup
| Argentina | Saudi Arabia |
| (Argentina) | (Saudi Arabia) |
| 3 | 1 |
- Date: 20 October 1992
- Venue: King Fahd II Stadium, Riyadh
- Referee: Lim Kee Chong (Mauritius)
- Attendance: 75,000

The 1992 King Fahd Cup final was a football match to determine the winners of the 1992 King Fahd Cup. The match was held at King Fahd II Stadium, Riyadh, Saudi Arabia, on 20 October 1992 and was contested by Argentina and Saudi Arabia. Argentina won the match 3–1. For Saudi Arabia, this appearance meant they were the first Asian team to reach the final of a major FIFA tournament.

== Match details ==
20 October 1992

| Argentina | 3–1 | Saudi Arabia |
|---|---|---|
| Rodríguez 18'; Caniggia 24'; Simeone 64' | Report | Al-Owairan 65' |

King Fahd II Stadium, Riyadh
Attendance: 75,000
Referee: Lim Kee Chong (Mauritius)

| Argentina | Saudi Arabia |

| GK | 1 | Sergio Goycochea |
| RB | 4 | Fabián Basualdo | (yellow card) 62' |
| CB | 2 | Sergio Vázquez |
| CB | 6 | Oscar Ruggeri (c) |
| LB | 3 | Ricardo Altamirano |
| RM | 8 | José Luis Villarreal | | (substituted off) 81' |
| CM | 5 | Fernando Redondo |
| CM | 10 | Diego Simeone | (yellow card) 28' |
| LM | 20 | Leonardo Rodríguez | | (substituted off) 73' |
| CF | 7 | Claudio Caniggia |
| CF | 9 | Gabriel Batistuta |
Substitutions:
| FW | 14 | Alberto Acosta | | (substituted on) 73' |
| MF | 11 | Diego Cagna | | (substituted on) 81' |
Manager:
(Argentina) Alfio Basile

| GK | 1 | Saud Al-Otaibi |
| CB | 2 | Abdullah Al-Dosari |
| CB | 4 | Salem Al-Alawi |
| CB | 3 | Abdul Rahman Al-Roomi |
| DM | 6 | Fuad Anwar Amin (c) | (yellow card) 47' |
| RM | 5 | Mohammed Al-Khilaiwi |
| CM | 8 | Fahad Al-Bishi | | (substituted off) 67' |
| CM | 14 | Khaled Al-Muwallid |
| LM | 16 | Khaled Al-Hazaa |
| CF | 7 | Saeed Al-Owairan |
| CF | 10 | Sami Al-Jaber | | (substituted off) 45' |
Substitutions:
| FW | 11 | Fahad Al-Mehallel | | (substituted on) 45' |
| MF | 17 | Abdul Aziz Al-Razqan | | (substituted on) 67' |
Manager:
(Brazil) Nelsinho Rosa

Assistant referees:
Rodrigo Badilla (Costa Rica)
Jamal Al Sharif (Syria)
