= 1992 Arab Club Champions Cup =

بطولة الأندية العربية لأبطال الدوري 1992

Tournament details
- Host country: Qatar
- City: Doha
- Dates: 8–19 February 1993
- Teams: 8 (from 2 confederations) (from 8 associations)
- Venue: (in 1 host city)

Final positions
- Champions: (Saudi Arabia) Al Shabab (1st title)
- Runners-up: (Qatar) Al-Arabi

Tournament statistics
- Matches played: 12
- Goals scored: 40 (3.33 per match)
- Top scorer: (Tunisia) Ayadi Hamrouni (4 goals)
- Best player: (Saudi Arabia) Abdullah Al-Harthi
- Best goalkeeper: (Qatar) Ahmed Khalil
- Fair play award: (Jordan) Al-Faisaly

The 1992 Arab Club Champions Cup was played in Qatar in the city of Doha. Al Shabab won the championship for the first time beating Al-Arabi in the final.

== Participants ==
Participants
| Zone | Team | Qualifying method |
|---|---|---|
| | (Qatar) Al-Arabi | Hosts |
| Zone 1 | (United Arab Emirates) Al Shabab Dubai | 1989–90 UAE League winners |
| Zone 2 | (Egypt) Ismaily SC | 1990–91 Egyptian Premier League winners |
| Zone 2 | (Saudi Arabia) Al Shabab | 1990–91 Saudi Premier League winners |
| Zone 3 | (Algeria) WA Tlemcen | 1990–91 Algerian Championnat National 12th |
| Zone 3 | (Tunisia) Espérance de Tunis | 1990–91 Tunisian Championship winners |
| Zone 4 | (Jordan) Al-Faisaly | 1990–91 Jordan League winners |
| Zone 4 | (Palestine) Hilal Al-Quds | West Bank Premier League representative |

- WA Tlemcen withdrew the tournament.

== Preliminary round ==
=== Zone 1 (Gulf Area) ===
Al Shabab (Dubai) advanced to the final tournament.

=== Zone 2 (Red Sea) ===
Ismaily SC & Al Shabab (Riyadh) advanced to the final tournament.

=== Zone 3 (North Africa) ===
WA Tlemcen & Espérance de Tunis advanced to the final tournament.

=== Zone 4 (East Region) ===
Al-Faisaly & Hilal Al-Quds advanced to the final tournament.

== Final tournament ==
Final tournament held in Doha, Qatar from 8 to 18 February 1992. WA Tlemcen withdrew the tournament, Espérance de Tunis moved from Group B to Group A.

=== Group stage ===
==== Group A ====
| Team | Pld | W | D | L | GF | GA | GD | Pts |
|---|---|---|---|---|---|---|---|---|
| (Saudi Arabia) Al Shabab | 3 | 2 | 1 | 0 | 6 | 2 | +4 | 5 |
| (Qatar) Al-Arabi | 3 | 1 | 2 | 0 | 5 | 1 | +4 | 4 |
| (Tunisia) Espérance de Tunis | 3 | 1 | 1 | 1 | 10 | 4 | +6 | 3 |
| (Palestine) Hilal Al-Quds | 3 | 0 | 0 | 3 | 0 | 14 | −14 | 0 |

8 February 1992

| Al-Arabi (Qatar) | 0 – 0 | (Saudi Arabia) Al Shabab |

Doha
8 February 1992

| Espérance de Tunis (Tunisia) | 7 – 0 | (Palestine) Hilal Al-Quds |

Doha

10 February 1992

| Al Shabab (Saudi Arabia) | 3 – 0 | (Palestine) Hilal Al-Quds |

Doha
10 February 1992

| Al-Arabi (Qatar) | 1 – 1 | (Tunisia) Espérance de Tunis |

Doha

13 February 1992

| Al Shabab (Saudi Arabia) | 3 – 2 | (Tunisia) Espérance de Tunis |

Doha
13 February 1992

| Al-Arabi (Qatar) | 4 – 0 | (Palestine) Hilal Al-Quds |

Doha

==== Group B ====
| Team | Pld | W | D | L | GF | GA | GD | Pts |
|---|---|---|---|---|---|---|---|---|
| (Egypt) Ismaily SC | 2 | 2 | 0 | 0 | 4 | 1 | +3 | 4 |
| (Jordan) Al-Faisaly | 2 | 1 | 0 | 1 | 7 | 3 | +4 | 2 |
| (United Arab Emirates) Al Shabab Dubai | 2 | 0 | 0 | 2 | 3 | 10 | −7 | 0 |

9 February 1992

| Al-Faisaly (Jordan) | 7 – 2 | (United Arab Emirates) Al Shabab Dubai |

Doha

11 February 1992

| Ismaily SC (Egypt) | 3 – 1 | (United Arab Emirates) Al Shabab Dubai |

Doha

14 February 1992

| Ismaily SC (Egypt) | 1 – 0 | (Jordan) Al-Faisaly |

Doha

=== Knockout stage ===
Semi-finals
16 February – Doha
(Saudi Arabia) Al Shabab | 2
(Jordan) Al-Faisaly | 0
16 February – Doha
(Egypt) Ismaily SC | 0
(Qatar) Al-Arabi | 1

Final
18 February – Doha
(Saudi Arabia) Al Shabab (aet) | 2
(Qatar) Al-Arabi | 0

==== Semi-finals ====
16 February 1992

| Al Shabab (Saudi Arabia) | 2 – 0 | (Jordan) Al-Faisaly |
|---|---|---|
| Al-Owairan 19'; Al-Anazi 67' |

Khalifa International Stadium, Doha

16 February 1992

| Ismaily SC (Egypt) | 0 – 1 | (Qatar) Al-Arabi |
|---|---|---|
| | | Addison 36' |

Khalifa International Stadium, Doha

==== Final ====
16 February 1992

| Al Shabab (Saudi Arabia) | 2–0 (a.e.t.) | (Qatar) Al-Arabi |
|---|---|---|
| Al-Kaltham 100'; Al-Mehallel 112' |

Khalifa International Stadium, Doha

== Winners ==
1992 Arab Club Champions Cup winners
(Saudi Arabia)
Al Shabab
First title
