= Fares Tarek =

Egyptian footballer (born 2000)

Personal information
- Full name: Fares Mohamed Tarek
- Date of birth: 14 January 2000 (age 26)
- Height: 1.79 m (5 ft 10 in)
- Position: Right-back

Team information
- Current team: Tanta

Youth career
- 2010–2021: Al Ahly

Senior career*
Years	Team	Apps	(Gls)
2021–2022	Al Ahly	0	(0)
2021	→ Misr Lel Makkasa (loan)	13	(0)
2021–2022	→ Future (loan)	0	(0)
2023–2024	Tanta		
2024–2025	Sporting Alexandria		
2025–	Tanta		
- * Club domestic league appearances and goals as of 23:14, 14 May 2025 (UTC)

Fares Mohamed Tarek (Arabic: فارس طارق; born 14 January 2000) is an Egyptian professional footballer who plays as a right-back for Tanta.

== Club career ==
Having joined the academy of Al Ahly in 2010, Tarek was invited to first-team training for the first time in late 2019. In January 2020, he was linked with a move to unnamed clubs in Türkiye and the United Arab Emirates, as well as rejecting an official offer from Al Masry. He was promoted to the first team again in April 2020, where he was likened to fellow right-back Mohamed Hany by teammates Hossam Ashour and Walid Soliman, and also in October of the same year.

In January 2021, he was loaned to fellow Egyptian Premier League club Misr Lel Makkasa on a six-month deal. He started well for his new club, notably producing a good performance at right-back against Smouha. At the end of the season, Misr Lel Makkasa asked Al Ahly to renew Tarek's loan ahead of the following year. This move was initially welcomed by then-manager Pitso Mosimane, and with the form of fellow right-back Akram Tawfik at Al Ahly, as well as the signing of Karim Fouad, a return to the club he had started his career at was seen as unlikely by Egyptian media.

Despite the interest from Misr Lel Makkasa, Tarek would instead join Future on a season-long loan in September 2021. This move was less successful, with Tarek making only one appearance for the club in the Egypt Cup, and at the end of the 2021–22 season, following Future's signing of right-back Hesham Hafez, Tarek was released back to Al Ahly.

Having been released by Al Ahly, Tarek joined Egyptian Second Division A club Tanta in September 2023. The following year he moved to Sporting Alexandria, signing a two-year deal in October 2024. However, he returned to Tanta after just four months.

== Career statistics ==
=== Club ===
As of 15 May 2025.

Appearances and goals by club, season and competition
Club	Season	League			National Cup (Note: Includes Egypt Cup)		League Cup (Note: Includes Egyptian League Cup)		Other		Total	
Club	Season	Division	Apps	Goals	Apps	Goals	Apps	Goals	Apps	Goals	Apps	Goals
Al Ahly	2020–21	Egyptian Premier League	0	0	0	0	0	0	0	0	0	0
Al Ahly	2021–22	Egyptian Premier League	0	0	0	0	0	0	0	0	0	0
Al Ahly	Total		0	0	0	0	0	0	0	0	0	0
Misr Lel Makkasa (loan)	2020–21	Egyptian Premier League	13	0	1	0	0	0	—		14	0
Future (loan)	2021–22	Egyptian Premier League	0	0	1	0	0	0	—		1	0
Total			13	0	2	0	0	0	0	0	15	0
