= Hussein El-Sayed =

Egyptian footballer (born 1964)

Personal information
- Date of birth: 11 December 1964 (age 61)
- Position: Goalkeeper

Senior career*
Years	Team	Apps	(Gls)
1984–1987	Esco		
1987–1999	Zamalek		

International career
1988–1997	Egypt		

Managerial career
- 1999–2000: Zamalek (Goalkeeping coach)
- * Club domestic league appearances and goals

Hussein El-Sayed (Arabic: حسين السيد; born 11 December 1964), is an Egyptian former professional footballer. He played for Zamalek as a goalkeeper. In 2017, he was appointed manager of the team, but resigned later that year. He is currently a board member of Zamalek.

== International career ==
He represented Egypt in the 1994 African Cup of Nations.

== Honours ==
Zamalek

- Egyptian Premier League: 3
  1987–88, 1991–92, 1992–93
- Egypt Cup: 2
  1987–88, 1998–99
- African Cup of Champions Clubs: 2
  1993, 1996
- CAF Super Cup: 2
  1994, 1997
- Afro-Asian Club Championship: 2
  1987, 1997
