= Mahmoud Fahmy =

Egyptian footballer (born 1999)

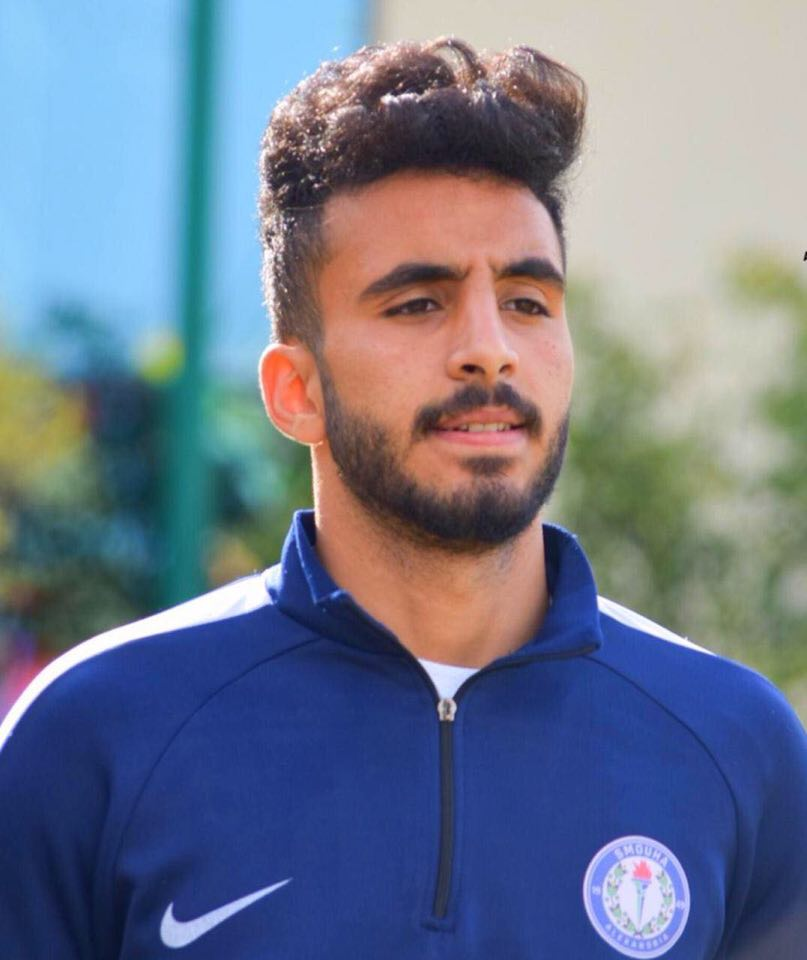
- Fahmy with Smouha in 2020

Personal information
- Full name: Mahmoud Fahmy
- Date of birth: 23 December 1999 (age 26)
- Place of birth: Abou Hamad, El Sharkia, Egypt
- Position: Forward

Team information
- Current team: Smouha (on loan from Misr Lel Makkasa)
- Number: 37

Youth career
- 2011–2017: Al Nasr

Senior career*
Years	Team	Apps	(Gls)
2017–2019	Al Nasr	34	(10)
2019–	Misr Lel Makkasa	0	(0)
2019–	→ Smouha (loan)	3	(0)

International career
2017	Egypt U20	6	(0)
- * Club domestic league appearances and goals as of 8 February 2020

Mahmoud Fahmy (Arabic: مَحْمُود فَهْمِيّ; born 23 December 1999), sometimes spelled Mahmoud Fahmi, is an Egyptian professional footballer who plays as a forward for Egyptian Premier League club Smouha, on loan from Misr Lel Makkasa. Fahmy was a member of the Egyptian U20 team in 2017, earning six caps.

== Career ==
=== Early career ===
Fahmy was a member of Egyptian Second Division side Al Nasr's youth team for six years from 2011 to 2017, until the club earned promotion to the Egyptian Premier League during the 2016–17 season. Prior to the start of the new season, he was selected by the first team manager Sayed Eid to be promoted to the club's squad.

=== Breakthrough ===
Despite playing only eight matches and suffering an immediate relegation with his club, Fahmy managed to keep his place in the first team. He played all 26 matches in the 2018–19 Egyptian Second Division season and finished as the top goalscorer in Group B with 10 goals, attracting the eyes of numerous top flight sides as a result.

On 18 June 2019, it was reported that Fahmy had signed for Egyptian giants Al Ahly for a reported fee of £E2.5m, but negotiations between both clubs failed. Five days later, Misr Lel Makkasa announced that they had acquired two players from Al Nasr, among whom Fahmy. He was immediately loaned to Smouha before the start of the 2019–20 season.

== International career ==
Fahmy was called up for the Egyptian U-20 team preliminary squad for the 2017 Africa U-20 Cup of Nations in Zambia for the first time in his career. He appeared in his team's friendly matches before the tournament, but failed to make it to the final squad after suffering from a pubalgia.
