= 1992 Arab Cup =

6th Arab Cup, held in Syria

1992 Arab Cup / 1992 Arab Games football tournament

Tournament details
- Host country: Syria
- Dates: 8–17 September
- Teams: 6 (from 2 confederations)
- Venue: 1 (in 1 host city)

Final positions
- Champions: Egypt (1st title Arab Cup) (3rd title Arab Games)
- Runners-up: Saudi Arabia
- Third place: Kuwait
- Fourth place: Syria

Tournament statistics
- Matches played: 10
- Goals scored: 23 (2.3 per match)
- Top scorer(s): (Egypt) Ayman Mansour (Saudi Arabia) Saeed Al-Owairan (Saudi Arabia) Waleed Al-Felaij (2 goals each)

The 1992 Arab Cup was the sixth edition of the Arab Cup and also counted as the seventh edition of the 1992 Arab Games football tournament, hosted by Syria, in 2 Provinces Aleppo and Damascus. Egypt won their first title of the Arab Cup and their third gold medal of the Arab Games by beating Saudi Arabia in the final.

== Part of the Arab Games ==
The 1992 edition organized as part of the 1992 Arab Games football tournament was also counted as a part of the Arab Cup.

== Participating teams ==
=== Iraq absent ===
The most successful team and holder of the Arab Cup with four titles and the gold medalist holder in the Arab Games football tournament, Iraq the defending champions banned for playing in the Arab Cup due to Gulf War.

=== Teams of the tournament ===
Egypt participated with the olympic team. The 6 participating teams are:

Participants
Zone	Team
Hosts	Syria
Holders	None
Zone 1 (Gulf Area)	Kuwait
Zone 2 (Red Sea)	Egypt
Zone 2 (Red Sea)	Saudi Arabia
Zone 3 (North Africa)	None
Zone 4 (East Region)	Jordan
Zone 4 (East Region)	Palestine

== Venues ==
Aleppo	1992 Arab Cup is located in Syria
Al-Hamadaniah Stadium	1992 Arab Cup is located in Syria
Capacity: 20,000	1992 Arab Cup is located in Syria

== Group stage ==
=== Group A ===
Team	Pld	W	D	L	GF	GA	GD	Pts
Egypt	2	1	1	0	2	1	+1	3
Kuwait	2	1	0	1	4	2	+2	2
Jordan	2	0	1	1	2	5	−3	1

8 September 1992

Egypt	1–1	Jordan
Mansour 68'		Tadrus 6'

Al-Hamadaniah Stadium, Aleppo
Referee: Omar Al-Shaqeer (Saudi Arabia)

10 September 1992

Kuwait	4–1	Jordan
Soliman; Al Saleh 54' (?) ?		Muhammad Al-Ashhab

Al-Hamadaniah Stadium, Aleppo

12 September 1992

Egypt	1–0	Kuwait
Mansour 40'

Al-Hamadaniah Stadium, Aleppo

=== Group B ===
Team	Pld	W	D	L	GF	GA	GD	Pts
Saudi Arabia	2	1	1	0	3	2	+1	3
Syria	2	0	2	0	1	1	0	2
Palestine	2	0	1	1	1	2	−1	1

9 September 1992

Syria	1–1	Saudi Arabia
Kardaghli 78'		Abdullah 58' (pen.)

Al-Hamadaniah Stadium, Aleppo
Referee: Kamal Sobhi (Egypt)

11 September 1992

Syria	0–0	Palestine

Al-Hamadaniah Stadium, Aleppo

13 September 1992

Saudi Arabia	2–1	Palestine
Al-Bishi 54'; Al-Owairan 57'		Goal

Al-Hamadaniah Stadium, Aleppo

== Knockout stage ==
=== Bracket ===
Semi-finals
15 September – Aleppo
Egypt (p)	0 (4)
Syria	0 (3)
15 September – Aleppo
Saudi Arabia	2
Kuwait	0

Final
17 September – Aleppo
Egypt	3
Saudi Arabia	2
Third place
17 September – Aleppo
Kuwait	2
Syria	1

=== Semi-finals ===
15 September 1992

Egypt	0–0	Syria
Penalties
El-Sheshini (penalty scored) ? (penalty scored) ? (penalty scored); Mansour (penalty missed); El-Kass (penalty scored)	4–3	(penalty scored) Qadir; (penalty missed) Khalaf; (penalty scored) Afash; (penalty scored) Khalifa; (penalty missed) Dib

Al-Hamadaniah Stadium, Aleppo
Attendance: 20,000

15 September 1992

Saudi Arabia	2–0	Kuwait
Al-Muwallid 38'; Al-Jaber 87'

Al-Hamadaniah Stadium, Aleppo

=== Third place play-off ===
17 September 1992

Kuwait	2–1	Syria
Al-Flayah 11', 51'		Goal

Al-Hamadaniah Stadium, Aleppo

=== Final ===
17 September 1992
17:00 UTC+2

Egypt	3–2	Saudi Arabia
El-Sheshini 4' (pen.); El-Kass 26'; H. Hassan 85'		Al-Roomi 9'; Al-Owairan 73'

Al-Hamadaniah Stadium, Aleppo
Referee: Nizar Watti (Syria)

== Final ranking ==
Pos	Team	Pld	W	D	L	GF	GA	GD	Pts	Final result
1st place, gold medalist(s)	Egypt	4	2	2	0	5	3	+2	8	Gold Medal & Arab Cup champions
2nd place, silver medalist(s)	Saudi Arabia	4	2	1	1	7	5	+2	7	Silver Medal
3rd place, bronze medalist(s)	Kuwait	4	2	0	2	6	5	+1	6	Bronze Medal
4	Syria (H)	4	0	3	1	2	3	−1	3	Fourth place
5	Palestine	2	0	1	1	1	2	−1	1	Eliminated in group stage
6	Jordan	2	0	1	1	2	5	−3	1	Eliminated in group stage

Source: rsssf
(H) Hosts
