= Mohamed Ahmed (footballer, born 1998) =

Egyptian footballer

Personal information
- Full name: Mohamed Ahmed
- Date of birth: January 20, 1998 (age 28)
- Place of birth: Giza, Egypt
- Height: 1.85 m (6 ft 1 in)
- Position: Right back

Team information
- Current team: Ismaily
- Number: 23

Youth career
- 2016–2017: Zamalek SC

Senior career*
Years	Team	Apps	(Gls)
2017–	Zamalek	2	(0)
2017–2018	Al Ittihad (loan)	3	(1)

International career^{‡}
2018–	Egypt U20	2	(0)
- * Club domestic league appearances and goals as of January 6, 2019 (EST) ‡ National team caps and goals as of January 6, 2019

Mohamed Ahmed (Arabic: محمد احمد) (born 1998) is an Egyptian footballer who plays for the Egyptian Premier League side Zamalek SC as a defender known as Camacho.

== Honours ==
=== Zamalek SC ===
- Saudi-Egyptian Super Cup: 2018
- CAF Confederation Cup : 2018–19
