= Labib Mahmoud =

Egyptian footballer (born 1907)

Personal information
- Full name: Hani Labib Mahmoud
- Place of birth: Egypt
- Position: Forward

Senior career*
| Years | Team | Apps | (Gls) |
| 1923–1931 | Zamalek SC | | |
| 1931–1940 | Al-Ahly SC | | |
| 1940–1941 | Zamalek SC | | |

International career
- Egypt

Managerial career
- Al Ahly
- * Club domestic league appearances and goals

Hani Labib Mahmoud (Arabic: هَانِي لَبِيب مَحْمُود; born 25 August 1907, date of death unknown) was an Egyptian football forward who played for Egypt in the 1934 FIFA World Cup. He also played for Zamalek and Al Ahly, Mahmoud is deceased.

== Career ==
=== Club career ===
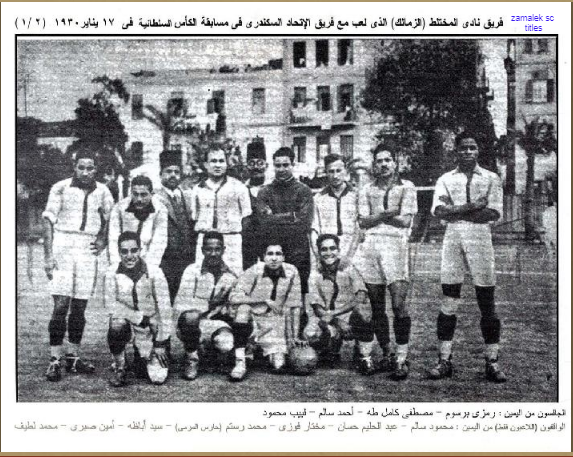
Mahmoud (first sitting from left) with Zamalek in 1930

He started his career in Zamalek in 1925, and won the King Fouad Cup title in his first season, he won with Zamalek the 1928–29, 1929–30 Cairo League and the 1932 Egypt Cup title. In 1933, he moved to their rivals Al Ahly and spent the majority of his career with them. In 1940, he returned to Zamalek, and won the 1941 Egypt Cup title. He retired in 1941.

=== International career ===
He represented Egypt in the 1934 FIFA World Cup and 1936 Summer Olympics.
