= Ashraf Youssef =

Egyptian footballer (born 1965)

Personal information
- Date of birth: 20 October 1965 (age 61)
- Position: Left full back

Senior career*
Years	Team	Apps	(Gls)
1988–1993	Minya		
1993–1995	Zamalek		
1995–1996	Tersana SC		
1996–2000	Dina Farms FC		
2000–2001	Sohag SC		
2001–2002	Telephonat Beni Suef SC		

International career
- Egypt
- * Club domestic league appearances and goals

Ashraf Youssef (Arabic: أشرف يوسف; born 20 October 1965), is a former Egyptian professional footballer. He played for Minya and Zamalek as a defender. He was born in a Coptic family.

== International career ==
He represented Egypt in the 1994 African Cup of Nations.

== Honours ==
Zamalek

- African Cup of Champions Clubs: 1
  1993
- CAF Super Cup: 1
  1994
