= Misr Lel Makkasa SC =

Association football club in Faiyum, Egypt

Makkasa
- Full name: Misr lel-Makkasa Sporting Club
- Founded: 1937; 89 years ago
- Ground: Faiyum Stadium
- Capacity: 20,000
- President: Mohamed Abdel Salam
- Head coach: Tarek Hagag
- League: Egyptian Third Division
- 2021–22: Egyptian Premier League, 18th (relegated)
- Website: www.makasasc.com
Home colours	Away colours

Misr lel-Makkasa Sporting Club (Arabic: نادي مصر للمقاصة الرياضي), commonly known as Makkassa, is an Egyptian sports club based in Faiyum, Egypt. The club is related to Misr lel-Makkasa Company (Misr for Central Clearing, Depository and Registry).

Misr lel-Makkasa is mainly known for its professional football team, which currently plays in the Egyptian Third Division, the third highest league in the Egyptian football league system.

The club was formerly known as Hweidi Club and El-Fara'na before the current name was adopted.

== History ==
=== Football record ===
After few attempts, Misr eventually gained promotion to the Egyptian Premier League from the Second Division in 2009–10 for the first time in its history. It earned promotion after a 2–0 win against Wadi El Gedid FC at home ground. Misr Lel Makasa came top on its group ahead of Telephonaat Bani Suweif FC. El Mekkasa finished 2016–17 Egyptian Premier League in the second position to be the second time for the team to finish in the top four and first time to qualify to the CAF Champions League.

== Performance in CAF competitions ==
- PR = Preliminary round
- FR = First round
- SR = Second round
- PO = Play-off round

Season	Competition	Round	Country	Club	Home	Away	Aggregate
2016	CAF Confederation Cup	PR	Ethiopia	Defence Force	3–0	3–1	6–1
2016	CAF Confederation Cup	FR	DR Congo	CS Don Bosco	3–1	0–1	3–2
2016	CAF Confederation Cup	SR	Algeria	CS Constantine	3–1	0–1	3–2
2016	CAF Confederation Cup	PO	Libya	Al Ahli Tripoli	1–1	0–0	1–1 (a)
2018	CAF Champions League	PR	Senegal	Génération Foot	0–0	0–2	0–2

=== Current squad ===
Note: Flags indicate national team as defined under FIFA eligibility rules; some limited exceptions apply. Players may hold more than one non-FIFA nationality.

No.	Pos.	Nation	Player
1	GK	EGY	Mohamed Koko
2	DF	EGY	Ahmed Abdelaziz
3	DF	EGY	Mohamed Desouki
4	MF	EGY	Hesham Mohamed
5	MF	EGY	Abdallah Magdy
6	MF	EGY	Mostafa Shebeita
7	MF	EGY	Emad Fathy
8	DF	EGY	Asem Said
9	FW	EGY	Basem Morsy
10	MF	EGY	Salah Ashour
11	FW	MAD	Paulin Voavy
12	DF	EGY	Hosny Fathy (Captain)
14	MF	EGY	Ahmed Adel
15	MF	UGA	Khalid Aucho
16	GK	EGY	Mahmoud Hamdy
17	DF	EGY	Essam Sobhy

No.	Pos.	Nation	Player
18	FW	ETH	Shimelis Bekele
20	MF	EGY	Mahmoud El Ghazali
21	MF	EGY	Ali Wezza
22	DF	EGY	Osama Azab
24	MF	EGY	Mohamed Makhlouf
25	GK	EGY	Beltagy Samir
26	GK	EGY	Mahmoud Abdel Monsef
27	MF	LBY	Muftah Taktak
30	FW	EGY	Ahmed Meteb
31	DF	EGY	Fares Tarek
32	MF	EGY	Ziad Ashraf
35	MF	MAR	Ahmed Marchuh
36	DF	EGY	Ahmed Sabeha
38	DF	EGY	Mohamed Adel
42	MF	EGY	Khaled Mostafa
—	MF	EGY	Islam Saleh

== Managers ==
- (Egypt) Ahmed Abdel Halim (July 1, 2009 – May 23, 2010)
- (Egypt) Tarek Yehia (June 6, 2010 – Oct 3, 2012)
- (Egypt) Mohamed Abdel-Galil (Oct 6, 2012 – Feb 27, 2013)
- (Egypt) Hossam Hassan (Feb 26, 2013 – May 28, 2013)
- (Egypt) Tarek Yehia (May 27, 2013 – 2014)
- (Egypt) Ehab Galal (July 19, 2014 – 2017)
- (Egypt) Talaat Youssef (Feb 17, 2019 – April 20, 2019)
- (Egypt) Jamal Omar (April 22, 2019 – June 9, 2019)
- (Egypt) Mido (June 10, 2019 – Jan 21, 2020)
- (Egypt) Jamal Omar (caretaker) (Jan 21, 2020 – Jan 31, 2020)
- (Nigeria) Emmanuel Amunike (Jan. 31, 2020 – Feb. 29, 2020)
- (Egypt) Ehab Galal (Feb. 29, 2020 – Sept. 22, 2020)
- (Egypt) Ali Ashour (Sept. 22, 2020 – Oct. 12, 2020)
- (Egypt) Jamal Omar (caretaker) (Oct. 12, 2020 – Nov. 26, 2020)
- (Egypt) Ehab Galal (Nov. 26, 2020 – Mar. 19, 2021)
- (Egypt) Mohamed Azima (Mar. 24, 2021 – Jun. 28, 2021)
- (Egypt) Mohamed Abdel-Galil (Jun. 29, 2021 – present)
