= Salah Ashour =

Egyptian footballer (born 1987)

Personal information
- Full name: Salah Ashour
- Date of birth: 8 September 1987 (age 39)
- Place of birth: Cairo, Egypt
- Height: 1.83 m (6 ft 0 in)
- Position: Striker

Team information
- Current team: ENPPI (youth coach)

Youth career
- ENPPI

Senior career*
Years	Team	Apps	(Gls)
2006–2009	ENPPI	6	(0)
2008–2009	→ Petrol Asyut (loan)	14	(0)
2009–2013	Ittihad El Shorta	59	(15)
2013	→ Kazma (loan)	?	(2)
2013–2017	ENPPI	110	(23)
2017	Zamalek	6	(1)
2018–2021	Misr Lel Makkasa	77	(6)
2021–2022	Eastern Company	6	(0)
Total		280	(47)

International career
2006–2007	Egypt U20	4	(2)
2012–2015	Egypt	4	(0)
- * Club domestic league appearances and goals

Salah Ashour (Arabic: صلاح عاشور, born 8 September 1987) is an Egyptian former footballer who played as a striker. He is currently a youth coach at Egyptian Premier League club ENPPI.
