= Frank Amankwah =

Ghanaian footballer

Personal information
- Date of birth: 29 December 1971 (age 54)
- Place of birth: Santasi, Kumasi, Ghana
- Height: 1.66 m (5 ft 5 in)
- Position: Defender

Senior career*
Years	Team	Apps	(Gls)
1990–1996	Asante Kotoko		
1996–1997	FC Gütersloh	7	(0)
1997–1999	AZ Alkmaar		
1999–2000	Iraklis		
2000–2004	Asante Kotoko		

International career
	Ghana	33	(2)
- * Club domestic league appearances and goals

Medal record

Men's association football

Representing Ghana

Olympic Games
Bronze medal – third place	1992 Barcelona	Team competition

Frank Amankwah (born 29 December 1971, in Obuasi) is a Ghanaian football player.

== International career ==
Amankwah was a member of the Men's National Team that won the bronze medal at the 1992 Summer Olympics in Barcelona, Spain. Frank Amankwah now lives in London
