= Mohamed Abdel-Galil =

Egyptian footballer (born 1968)

Personal information
- Date of birth: 2 October 1968 (age 58)
- Place of birth: Egypt
- Position: Midfielder

Senior career*
Years	Team	Apps	(Gls)
1987–1994	Al-Ahly		
1994–1997	Zamalek		
1997–1998	Baladiyat El Mahalla		

International career
1988–1994	Egypt	21	(2)
- * Club domestic league appearances and goals

Mohamed Abdel-Galil (Arabic: محمد عبدالجليل) is an Egyptian former international midfielder. He spent his playing career with Zamalek SC and Al-Ahly.

Mohamed made some appearances for the Egypt national football team, including 1994 African Nations Cup matches.
