= Anthony Mensah =

Ghanaian footballer

Personal information
- Birth name: Anthony Osei Kwadwo
- Date of birth: 31 October 1972 (age 52)
- Place of birth: Kumasi, Ghana

Medal record

Men's association football

Representing Ghana

Olympic Games
Bronze medal – third place	1992 Barcelona	Team competition

Anthony Osei Kwadwo (born 31 October 1972 in Kumasi), known as Anthony Mensah, is a former Ghanaian football goalkeeper.

== Career ==
Mensah used this name whilst playing for Asante Kotoko FC. He won the best defender Award as the goalkeeper for Asante Kotoko FC in the 1993/1994 football season.

== International ==
Mensah was a member of the Men's National Team that won the bronze medal at the 1992 Summer Olympics in Barcelona, Spain.

== Coaching career ==
He is currently a football coach for a youth club in the United States in Cincinnati, Ohio. As well as a goalkeeper coach at Indian Hill High School.
