= George Arthur (Ghanaian footballer) =

Ghanaian footballer

Personal information
- Date of birth: 30 June 1968
- Place of birth: Sunyani, Bono region, Ghana
- Date of death: 14 June 2015 (aged 46)
- Place of death: Sunyani, Bono region, Ghana
- Positions: Midfielder; forward

Senior career*
Years	Team	Apps	(Gls)
1982–1983	BA Stars		
1984–1987	Kumasi Asante Kotoko		
1989–1991	Wormatia Worms		
1991–1992	BA Stars		
1993–1994	Kumasi Asante Kotoko		
1994–1997	Al Ahly		
1997–1999	Kumasi Asante Kotoko		

International career
1987–1994	Ghana		
- * Club domestic league appearances and goals

George Arthur (30 June 1968 – 14 June 2015) was a Ghanaian football player. A midfielder and forward, Arthur made his professional debut in 1982 and played for the BA Stars, Kumasi Asante Kotoko, and Egypt's Al Ahly. Arthur was a member of Ghana's national team from the late 1980s to 1994. He retired in 1999 and later became the BA Stars CEO. Arthur collapsed at the restaurant Dreamers in Sunyani and was declared dead at the Brong Ahafo Regional Hospital on 14 June 2015.
