= Mahmoud Abdel Monsef =

Egyptian footballer (born 1997)

Personal information
- Full name: Mahmoud Abdel Monsef
- Date of birth: 22 May 1997 (age 29)
- Place of birth: Egypt
- Position: Goalkeeper

Team information
- Current team: Zamalek SC
- Number: 32

Youth career
- Zamalek SC

Senior career*
Years	Team	Apps	(Gls)
2017–	Zamalek SC		

International career^{‡}
- Egypt
- * Club domestic league appearances and goals as of 14:11, 8 September 2017 (UTC) ‡ National team caps and goals as of 14:11, 8 September 2017 (UTC)

Mahmoud Abdel Monsef (Arabic: مَحْمُود عَبْد الْمُنْصِف) is an Egyptian footballer who plays for Egyptian Premier League side Zamalek SC as a goalkeeper.

== Honours ==
Zamalek SC

- Egypt Cup: 2017–18
- Saudi-Egyptian Super Cup: 2018
