= Edward Agyeman-Duah =

Ghanaian footballer (born 1973)

Personal information
- Date of birth: 17 October 1973 (age 53)
- Position: Defender

Senior career*
Years	Team	Apps	(Gls)
1992–c.1995	Asante Kotoko		
1996–1999	Goldfields Obuasi		
2000–2002	Accra Hearts of Oak		

International career
1994-2001	Ghana	10	(0)
- * Club domestic league appearances and goals

Edward Agyeman-Duah (born 17 October 1973) is a retired Ghanaian football defender. He was a squad member at the 1994 and 1998 Africa Cup of Nations.
