= Sarfo Gyamfi =

Ghanaian footballer (born 1967)

Personal information
- Date of birth: 17 July 1967 (age 59)
- Position: Midfielder

Senior career*
Years	Team	Apps	(Gls)
1983	Neoplan Stars		
1983	Abeokuta Walls Rangers FC		
1983	Warri State Sugar Factory		
1983	Warri Water Corporation		
1984	NEPA		
1984–1990	Asante Kotoko		
- Admira Wacker
1991–1992	Tirol Innsbruck	13	(3)
1992–1993	VfB Leipzig	4	(0)
1993–1994	Hallescher FC		

International career
1992	Ghana	4	(0)
- * Club domestic league appearances and goals

Sarfo Gyamfi (born 17 July 1967) is a former Ghanaian international footballer. He was part of the squad that participated at the 1992 Africa Cup of Nations where Ghana reached the final.

He has played professional football in Ghana, Nigeria and Europe. He is known as "The Black President" by Asante Kotoko fans. He retired from playing in 1998.
