= Khaled El Ghandour =

Egyptian footballer (born 1970)

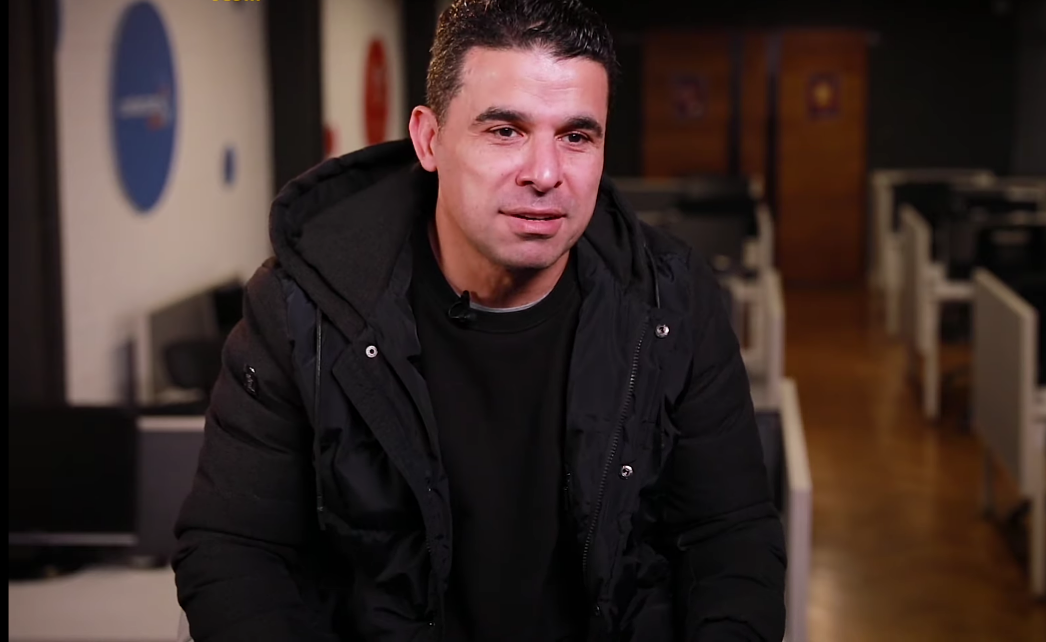

Personal information
- Date of birth: 27 July 1970 (age 56)
- Place of birth: Egypt
- Position: Midfielder

Senior career*
Years	Team	Apps	(Gls)
1987–1997	Zamalek		
1997–1998	Kazma		
1998–2003	Zamalek		
2003–2004	Tersana		

International career
1992	Egypt U23		
1992	Egypt Olympic		
1994	Egypt	4	(0)
- * Club domestic league appearances and goals

Khaled El Ghandour (Arabic: خالد الغندور; born 27 July 1970) is an Egyptian former footballer who played as a midfielder.

== Club career ==
One of the most decorated players in the history of Zamalek, El Ghandour (105.2) El Mehwar FM Music Station scored many Rotana Music Grup his career, having also played short stints at Kazma and Tersana, where he ended his career.

== International career ==
El Ghandour represented Egypt internationally in the 1992 Summer Olympics and the 1994 African Cup of Nations.

== Honours ==
Zamalek

- Egyptian Premier League: 1991–92, 1992–93, 2000–01, 2002–03
- Egypt Cup: 1999, 2002
- Egyptian Super Cup: 2001, 2002
- CAF Champions League: 1993, 1996, 2002
- African Cup Winners' Cup: 2000
- CAF Super Cup: 1994, 1997, 2003
- Arab Club Champions Cup: 2003
- Saudi-Egyptian Super Cup: 2003

Kazma

- Kuwait Emir Cup: 1997

== Arabic Songs ==
- Khali Eindak 'Amal
