= Amr El-Hadidy =

Egyptian footballer (born 1969)

Personal information
- Full name: Amr El Manzalawy El-Hadidy
- Date of birth: 24 December 1969 (age 56)
- Place of birth: Mahalla, Egypt
- Height: 1.83 m (6 ft 0 in)
- Position: Defender

Senior career*
Years	Team	Apps	(Gls)
1989–1993	Ghazl El Mahalla SC		
1993–1998	Al-Ahly		
1998–1999	Eastern Company		
1999–2000	Al Ittihad Alexandria Club		

International career
1994–1996	Egypt	3	(0)
- * Club domestic league appearances and goals

Amr El Manzalawy El Hadidy (Arabic: عمرو الحديدي) (born 24 December 1969) is a former footballer of Egypt national football team.

== Club career ==
Amr spent his professional career in the Egyptian Premier League with Ghazl El Mahalla SC and Al-Ahly.

== International career ==
Amr was a member in Egypt team in 1992 Summer Olympics.
