= Moustafa Ibrahim =

Egyptian footballer (born 1970)

Personal information
- Date of birth: 1 August 1970 (age 56)
- Position: Forward

Senior career*
Years	Team	Apps	(Gls)
- Zamalek SC

International career
- Egypt
- * Club domestic league appearances and goals

Moustafa Ibrahim (Arabic: مُصْطَفَى إِبْرَاهِيم; born 1 August 1970) is an Egyptian former footballer. He competed in the men's tournament at the 1992 Summer Olympics.
