= Hussein Abdel-Latif =

Egyptian football player (born 1965)

Personal information
- Full name: Hussein Abdel-Latif
- Date of birth: 17 December 1965 (age 60)
- Position: Right full back

Senior career*
Years	Team	Apps	(Gls)
1990–1997	Zamalek		
1997–1999	Aluminium Nag Hammâdi		

Managerial career
- 2005–2007: Aluminium Nag Hammâdi
- 2007–2008: Telephonat Beni Sweif
- 2009–2010: Sohag
- 2010–2011: Asyut Petroleum
- 2011–2012: Aluminium Nag Hammâdi
- 2012: Al Jabalain
- 2013: Sohag
- * Club domestic league appearances and goals

Hussein Abdel-Latif (Arabic: حسين عبد اللطيف) is a former Egyptian professional footballer and football manager. He played for Zamalek SC. As of 2014, he was technical director of the Qatari Al-Khor SC youth team. As of 2025, he is the coach of the Egypt national under-16 football team.

== Honours ==
Zamalek

- Egyptian Premier League: 2
  1991–92, 1992–93
- African Cup of Champions Clubs: 2
  1993, 1996
- CAF Super Cup: 2
  1994, 1997
