= Abdulrahman Al-Roomi =

Saudi Arabian footballer

Personal information
- Date of birth: 28 October 1969 (age 56)
- Place of birth: Saudi Arabia
- Position: Defender

Senior career*
Years	Team	Apps	(Gls)
1985-2001	Al Shabab	365	(11)

International career
1985	Saudi Arabia under-17	4	(0)
1985–1989	Saudi Arabia under-20	7	(0)
1992	Saudi Arabia	2	(0)
- * Club domestic league appearances and goals

Abdulrahman Al Roomi is a former Saudi Arabian football defender who played for Saudi Arabia in the 1992 Asian Cup. He also played for Al Shabab.
