= Ayman Mansour =

Egyptian footballer (born 1963)

Personal information
- Date of birth: 9 September 1963 (age 63)
- Place of birth: Egypt
- Position: Forward

Senior career*
Years	Team	Apps	(Gls)
- El Sekka El Hadid SC
- Zamalek

International career
1988-1994	Egypt	41	(7)

Managerial career
- 2006–2007: Al Kharaitiyat
- 2010–2011: Al-Markhiya
- 2015–2016: Al-Markhiya
- 2017: Al-Markhiya
Medal record
Men's football
Representing Egypt
FIFA Arab Cup
Winner	1992 Syria
- * Club domestic league appearances and goals

Ayman Mansour (Arabic: أيمن منصور; born 9 September 1963) is an Egyptian former footballer who played as a forward, most notably for Zamalek. Mansour played for the Egypt national team, including at the 1994 African Cup of Nations.

== Club career ==
Mansour was called "Super" after scoring the winning goal against Al Ahly club in the 1994 CAF Super Cup.

He retired following the 1996 season due to back problems.

== International career ==
Mansour made appearances in 34 matches for the Egypt national team scoring 9 goals. He won gold with Egypt during the 1992 Pan Arab Games, which also counted as the 1992 Arab Cup. He scored the fastest goal in the African Cup of nations History vs. Gabon, 1994, after 23 seconds of play.

== Honours ==
=== Player ===
Zamalek

- 2 Egyptian Premier League titles
- 2 CAF Champions League titles
- 2 African Super Cup titles

=== Assistant manager ===
Zamalek

- 1 Egyptian league (2003/2004)
- 1 Arab Club Championship (2003)
- 1 Egyptian Saudi Super Cup (2003)
