= Sami El-Sheshini =

Egyptian footballer (born 1972)

Personal information
- Full name: Sami Hussain El-Sheshini
- Date of birth: 23 January 1972 (age 54)
- Place of birth: Egypt
- Position: Defender

Team information
- Current team: Aswan SC (Manager)

Senior career*
Years	Team	Apps	(Gls)
1991–2001	Zamalek SC		
2001–2002	Kuwait SC		

International career
1992–1999	Egypt	15	(0)

Managerial career
- 2009–2009: Zamalek SC (Managing Dir.)
- 2009–2010: El Gouna FC (Assist.)
- 2010–2010: Telecom Egypt SC (Assist.)
- 2013–2015: Zamalek SC (Youth Coach)
- 2015–2015: Zamalek SC (Assist.)
- 2019–2019: Zamalek SC (Assist.)
- 2019–2020: Zamalek SC (Assist.)
- 2020– 2020: Aswan SC
- * Club domestic league appearances and goals

Sami El-Sheshini (Arabic: سامي الشيشيني; born 23 January 1972) is an Egyptian former professional footballer who played as a defender.

El-Sheshini spent most of his career playing for Egyptian Premier League side Zamalek SC. He played for the Zamalek side that won the 2000 African Cup Winners' Cup.

El-Sheshini made several appearances for the Egypt national football team, including three appearances at the 1998 African Cup of Nations finals. He also played for Egypt at the 1991 FIFA World Youth Championship in Portugal and the 1992 Summer Olympics in Barcelona.

== Managerial statistics ==
As of match played 21 December 2020

Managerial record by team and tenure
Team	From	To	Record					Ref.
Team	From	To	P	W	D	L	Win %	Ref.
Pyramids FC	1 June 2018	28 June 2018	0	0	0	0	—	
Aswan SC	22 October 2020	""Present""	3	2	0	1	66.7	
Total			3	2	0	1	66.7	—
