= 1996 African Cup of Champions Clubs final =

1996 African Champions Cup final
- Event: 1996 African Cup of Champions Clubs
Shooting Stars	Zamalek
(Nigeria)	(Egypt)
3	3
- Zamalek won 5–4 on penalties

First leg
Shooting Stars	Zamalek
2	1
- Date: 30 November 1996
- Venue: Lekan Salami Stadium, Ibadan
- Referee: Ian McLeod (South Africa)
- Attendance: 30,000

Second leg
Zamalek	Shooting Stars
2	1
- Date: 13 December 1996
- Venue: Cairo Stadium, Cairo
- Attendance: 75,000

The 1996 African Cup of Champions Clubs final was a football tie held over two legs in December 1996 between Shooting Stars, and Zamalek.

Zamalek from Egypt won that final, becoming the 1st African team to win Cup of Champions for fourth time.

== Match details ==
=== First leg ===
30 November 1996
--:-- UTC+0

Shooting Stars (Nigeria)	2–1	(Egypt) Zamalek
Onya 34'; Babalade 63'		Mostafa 89'

Lekan Salami Stadium
Attendance: 30,000
Referee: Ian McLeod (South Africa)

Shooting Stars:
GK	(Nigeria) Abiodun Baruwa
RB	(Nigeria) Issiaka Awoyemi
CB	(Nigeria) Emmanuel Teberen
CB	(Nigeria) Ajibade Babalade	(substituted off) 75'
LB	(Nigeria) Sam Pam
CM	(Nigeria) Arthur Madueme
CM	(Nigeria) Patrick Mancha
RW	(Nigeria) Duke Udi
AM	(Nigeria) Patrick Pascal Onya
LW	(Nigeria) Dotun Alatishe	(substituted off) 60'
CF	(Nigeria) David Ogaga
Substitutions:
MF	(Nigeria) Ovie Ighofose	(substituted on) 75'
FW	(Nigeria) Sanni Abacha	(substituted on) 60'
Manager:
(Nigeria) Shuaibu Amodu

Zamalek:
GK		(Egypt) Nader El-Sayed
CB		(Egypt) Motamed Gamal
CB	2	(Egypt) Medhat Abdel Hady
LB	8	(Egypt) Ashraf Kasem
CM	15	(Egypt) Tarek Mostafa
CM		(Egypt) Effat Nssar
RW		(Egypt) Ismail Youssef
AM	7	(Egypt) Osama Nabih
CM		(Egypt) Mohamed Sabry	(substituted off) 70'
FW		(Algeria) Kamel Kaci-Saïd
FW		(Egypt) Ahmed El-Kass
Substitutions:
CM		(Egypt) Nabil Mahmoud	(substituted on) 70'
Manager:
(Germany) Werner Olk

Assistant referees:

Fourth official:

=== Second leg ===
13 December 1996
--:-- UTC+2

Zamalek (Egypt)	2–1	(Nigeria) Shooting Stars
Abdel-Hady 29'; Mansour 66'		Ademola 89'
Penalties
Gamal (penalty scored); Mansour (penalty scored); El-Sheshini (penalty missed); El-Kass (penalty scored); Kasem (penalty scored); Nabih (penalty scored)	5–4	(penalty missed) Mancha; (penalty scored) ?; (penalty scored) Babalade; (penalty scored) ?; (penalty scored) Baruwa; (penalty missed) Ademola

Cairo International Stadium, Cairo
Attendance: 75,000
Referee: Sidi Békaye Magassa (Mali)

GK		(Egypt) Hussein El-Sayed	(substituted off) ?'
RB	15	(Egypt) Tarek Mostafa
CB	8	(Egypt) Ashraf Kasem
CB	2	(Egypt) Medhat Abdel-Hady
LB		(Egypt) Nabil Mahmoud
CM		(Egypt) Moetemed Gamal
CM	7	(Egypt) Ismail Youssef
RW		(Egypt) Mohamed Sabry	(substituted off) ?'
AM		(Egypt) Osama Nabih
FW	16	(Egypt) Ayman Mansour
FW		(Algeria) Kamel Kaci-Saïd	(substituted off) ?'
Substitutions:
GK		(Egypt) Nader El-Sayed	(substituted on) ?'
CM		(Egypt) Sami El-Sheshini	(substituted on) ?'
FW		(Egypt) Ahmed El-Kass	(substituted on) ?'
Manager:
(Germany) Werner Olk

GK	(Nigeria) Abiodun Baruwa
RB	(Nigeria)
CB	(Nigeria)
CB	(Nigeria) Ajibade Babalade
LB	(Nigeria)
CM	(Nigeria)
CM	(Nigeria) Patrick Mancha
RW	(Nigeria)
AM	(Nigeria) Patrick Pascal Onya
LW	(Nigeria) Johnson Ademola
CF	(Nigeria)
Substitutions:
Manager:
(Nigeria) Shuaibu Amodu

Man of the Match:

Assistant referees:

Fourth official:

== Notes and references ==
- https://www.angelfire.com/ak/EgyptianSports/ZamalekAfr1996.html
