= Zamalek SC in international football =

Zamalek SC in African football
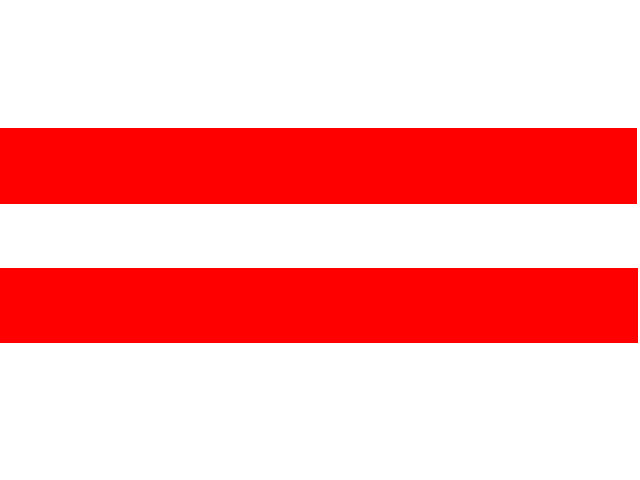
- Zamalek SC colors
- Club: Zamalek SC
- First entry: 1976 African Cup Winners' Cup
- Latest entry: 2025–26 CAF Confederation Cup

Titles
- Champions League: 5: 1984; 1986; 1993; 1996; 2002
- Confederation Cup: 2: 2019; 2024
- Cup Winners' Cup: 1: 2000
- Super Cup: 5: 1994; 1997; 2003; 2020; 2024
- Afro-Asian Cup: 2: 1987; 1997

Zamalek Sporting Club is a professional football club based in Giza, Egypt. The club first participated in African competitions in 1976. The first international cup they took part in was the African Cup Winners' Cup in which they participated as champions of Egypt Cup. Zamalek SC won the African Cup of Champions Clubs five times, the CAF Cup Winners' Cup once, the CAF Super Cup five times, the CAF Confederation Cup twice, and the Afro-Asian Club Championship twice. Zamalek has had the most success in the African Champions League in the 20th century, and remains the only club to win 9 trophies in total in the 20th century.

== Performance in CAF competitions ==
=== African Cup of Champions Clubs/CAF Champions League: 26 appearances ===
- 5 Times Champion: 1984, 1986, 1993, 1996, 2002
- 3 Times Runner-Up: 1994, 2016, 2020
- 2 Times Semi-Finalist: 1985, 2005
- 2 Times Quarter-Finalist: 1979, 1987
- 9 Times in Group Stage:1997, 2008, 2012, 2013, 2014, 2017, 2020-21, 2021–22, 2022–23
- 1 Time SR Round: 2003
- 4 Times FR Round: 1989, 2004, 2007, 2011

=== CAF Confederation Cup: 5 appearances ===
- 2 Time Champion: 2019, 2024
- 1 Time Runner-Up: 2026
- 1 Time Semi-Finalist: 2015
- 1 Time 1st Round: 2018

=== African Cup Winners' Cup: 4 appearances ===
- 1 Time Champion: 2000
- 1 Time Semi-Finalist: 1976
- 2 Times Quarter-Finalist: 1978, 2001

=== CAF Cup: 2 appearances ===
- 1 Time Semi-Finalist: 1999
- 1 Time FR Round: 1998

=== CAF Super Cup: 6 appearances ===
- 5 Times Champion: 1994, 1997, 2003, 2020, 2024
- 1 Time Runner-Up: 2001

=== Afro-Asian Club Championship: 3 appearances ===
- 2 Times Champion: 1987, 1997
- 1 Time Runner-Up: 1994

=== Results ===
- PR = Preliminary round
- FR = First round
- SR = Second round
- PO = Play-off round
- QF = Quarter-final
- SF = Semi-final

Season	Competition	Round	Country	Club	Home	Away	Aggregate
1976	African Cup Winners' Cup	FR	Libya	Al Ahli Tripoli	3–0	1–2	4–2
1976	African Cup Winners' Cup	QF	Ethiopia	Mechal	6–0	0–2	6–2
1976	African Cup Winners' Cup	SF	Nigeria	Shooting Stars	2–0	0–2	2–2 (3–5 p)
1978	African Cup Winners' Cup	FR	Sudan	Al Hilal	1–1	2–1	3–2
1978	African Cup Winners' Cup	QF	Upper Volta	RC Kadiogo	2–1	0–1	2–2 (a)
1979	African Cup of Champions Clubs	FR	Uganda	Simba	2–1	w/o	w/o (Note: Simba did not show up for the second leg. As a result, they were disqualified from the competition and Zamalek won on walkover.)
1979	African Cup of Champions Clubs	SR	Ethiopia	Ogaden Anbassa	w/o (Note: Zamalek won on walkover after Ogaden Anbassa withdrew.)		
1979	African Cup of Champions Clubs	QF	Zaire	CS Imana	3–1	w/o	w/o (Note: The second leg was abandoned in the second half with CS Imana leading 1–0 after fans invaded the pitch. Despite this, the match was played in Zaire, Zamalek were disqualified from the competition by CAF and CS Imana won on walkover.)
1981	African Cup Winners' Cup	FR	Somalia	Lavori Publici	w/o (Note: Lavori Publici won on walkover after Zamalek withdrew.)		
1984	African Cup of Champions Clubs	FR	Tunisia	CS Sfaxien	3–0	1–1	4–1
1984	African Cup of Champions Clubs	SR	Kenya	Gor Mahia	w/o (Note: The first leg was suspended in the first half with Zamalek leading 1–0 after Gor Mahia players attacked the match officials. As a result, Gor Mahia were disqualified from the competition by CAF and Zamalek won on walkover.)		
1984	African Cup of Champions Clubs	QF	Zambia	Nkana Red Devils	5–1	1–1	6–2
1984	African Cup of Champions Clubs	SF	Algeria	JE Tizi Ouzou	3–0	1–3	4–3
1984	African Cup of Champions Clubs	Final	Nigeria	Shooting Stars	2–0	1–0	3–0
1985	African Cup of Champions Clubs	FR	Somalia	Marine Club	w/o (Note: Zamalek won on walkover after Marine Club withdrew.)		
1985	African Cup of Champions Clubs	SR	Sudan	Al Hilal	4–0	1–1	5–1
1985	African Cup of Champions Clubs	QF	Burundi	Vital'O	5–2	0–1	5–3
1985	African Cup of Champions Clubs	SF	Morocco	FAR Rabat	1–0	0–1	1–1 (3–4 p)
1986	African Cup of Champions Clubs	FR	Rwanda	Panthères Noires	5–1	1–1	6–2
1986	African Cup of Champions Clubs	SR	Zimbabwe	Dynamos	2–1	2–0	4–1
1986	African Cup of Champions Clubs	QF	Burundi	AS Inter Star	3–0	0–1	3–1
1986	African Cup of Champions Clubs	SF	Cameroon	Canon Yaoundé	2–0	1–2	3–2
1986	African Cup of Champions Clubs	Final	Ivory Coast	Africa Sports	2–0	0–2	2–2 (4–2 p)
1987	African Cup of Champions Clubs	FR	Equatorial Guinea	Juvenil Reyes	w/o (Note: Zamalek won on walkover after Juvenil Reyes withdrew.)		
1987	African Cup of Champions Clubs	SR	Zambia	Nkana Red Devils	2–0	0–1	2–1
1987	African Cup of Champions Clubs	QF	Ghana	Asante Kotoko	2–0	1–5	3–5
1989	African Cup of Champions Clubs	FR	Sudan	Al Mourada	2–1	0–1	2–2 (a)
1993	African Cup of Champions Clubs	FR	Tanzania	Malindi	4–0	1–0	5–0
1993	African Cup of Champions Clubs	SR	South Africa	Kaizer Chiefs	1–0	1–2	2–2 (a)
1993	African Cup of Champions Clubs	QF	Algeria	MC Oran	4–0	1–1	5–1
1993	African Cup of Champions Clubs	SF	Nigeria	Stationery Stores	3–1	0–1	3–2
1993	African Cup of Champions Clubs	Final	Ghana	Asante Kotoko	0–0	0–0	0–0 (7–6 p)
1994	CAF Super Cup	Final	Egypt	Al Ahly	1–0		
1994	African Cup of Champions Clubs	FR	Uganda	Express	w/o (Note: Zamalek won on walkover after Express withdrew.)		
1994	African Cup of Champions Clubs	SR	Kenya	Gor Mahia	2–1	1–1	3–2
1994	African Cup of Champions Clubs	QF	Gabon	AS Sogara	1–0	2–2	3–2
1994	African Cup of Champions Clubs	SF	Zambia	Nkana	2–0	0–1	2–1
1994	African Cup of Champions Clubs	Final	Tunisia	Espérance de Tunis	0–0	1–3	1–3
1996	African Cup of Champions Clubs	FR	Mauritius	Sunrise Flacq United	3–1	1–2	4–3
1996	African Cup of Champions Clubs	SR	Mozambique	Desportivo Maputo	w/o (Note: Zamalek won on walkover after Desportivo Maputo withdrew.)		
1996	African Cup of Champions Clubs	QF	Morocco	COD Meknès	2–0	2–2	4–2
1996	African Cup of Champions Clubs	SF	Tunisia	CS Sfaxien	1–0	0–1	1–1 (4–3 p)
1996	African Cup of Champions Clubs	Final	Nigeria	Shooting Stars	2–1	1–2	3–3 (5–4 p)
1997	CAF Super Cup	Final	Egypt	Al Mokawloon Al Arab	0–0 (4–2 p)		
1997	CAF Champions League	FR	Ethiopia	Saint George	2–0	1–1	3–1
1997	CAF Champions League	SR	Zambia	Mufulira Wanderers	5–2	1–0	6–2
1997	CAF Champions League	Group B	Mozambique	Ferroviário Maputo	2–1	0–2	2nd
1997	CAF Champions League	Group B	Tunisia	Club Africain	2–0	0–2	2nd
1997	CAF Champions League	Group B	Ghana	Obuasi Goldfields	2–0	1–3	2nd
1998	CAF Cup	FR	Kenya	Gor Mahia	4–0	0–1	4–1
1998	CAF Cup	SR	Sudan	Al Hilal	0–0	0–1	0–1
1999	CAF Cup	FR	Burundi	Elite	w/o (Note: Zamalek won on walkover after Elite withdrew.)		
1999	CAF Cup	SR	Réunion	US Stade Tamponnaise	3–0	0–0	3–0
1999	CAF Cup	QF	Nigeria	Kwara United	4–0	1–2	5–2
1999	CAF Cup	SF	Tunisia	Étoile du Sahel	3–1	0–2	3–3 (a)
2000	African Cup Winners' Cup	FR	Tanzania	Young Africans	4–0	1–1	5–1
2000	African Cup Winners' Cup	SR	Ethiopia	Ethiopian Coffee	2–1	1–2	3–3 (4–2 p)
2000	African Cup Winners' Cup	QF	Senegal	ASEC Ndiambour	3–1	0–1	3–2
2000	African Cup Winners' Cup	SF	Réunion	SS Saint-Louisienne	2–0	0–0	2–0
2000	African Cup Winners' Cup	Final	Cameroon	Canon Yaoundé	4–1	0–2	4–3
2001	CAF Super Cup	Final	Ghana	Hearts of Oak	0–2		
2001	African Cup Winners' Cup	FR	Sudan	Al Hilal	1–0	1–0	2–0
2001	African Cup Winners' Cup	SR	Zambia	Nkana	2–0	2–2	4–2
2001	African Cup Winners' Cup	QF	Tunisia	Club Africain	1–0	1–3	2–3
2002	CAF Champions League	FR	Rwanda	APR	6–0	0–0	6–0
2002	CAF Champions League	SR	Zambia	Nkana	2–0	1–1	3–1
2002	CAF Champions League	Group B	Ivory Coast	ASEC Mimosas	3–1	0–1	1st
2002	CAF Champions League	Group B	Mozambique	Costa do Sol	3–0	2–0	1st
2002	CAF Champions League	Group B	Tunisia	Espérance de Tunis	1–0	1–1	1st
2002	CAF Champions League	SF	DR Congo	TP Mazembe	2–0	1–1	3–1
2002	CAF Champions League	Final	Morocco	Raja CA	1–0	0–0	1–0
2003	CAF Super Cup	Final	Morocco	Wydad AC	3–1		
2003	CAF Champions League	FR	Kenya	Nzoia Sugar	3–0	4–1	7–1
2003	CAF Champions League	SR	Tanzania	Simba	1–0	0–1	1–1 (2–3 p)
2004	CAF Champions League	FR	Rwanda	APR	3–2	1–4	4–6
2005	CAF Champions League	FR	Kenya	Tusker	3–1	1–0	4–1
2005	CAF Champions League	SR	Angola	ASA	2–0	1–1	3–1
2005	CAF Champions League	Group B	Ivory Coast	ASEC Mimosas	2–1	1–1	2nd
2005	CAF Champions League	Group B	Tunisia	Étoile du Sahel	1–1	1–2	2nd
2005	CAF Champions League	Group B	Tunisia	Espérance de Tunis	1–1	2–1	2nd
2005	CAF Champions League	SF	Egypt	Al Ahly	1–2	0–2	1–4
2007	CAF Champions League	PR	Burundi	Vital'O	4–1	1–0	5–1
2007	CAF Champions League	FR	Sudan	Al Hilal	2–2	0–2	2–4
2008	CAF Champions League	PR	Rwanda	APR	2–0	2–1	4–0
2008	CAF Champions League	FR	Ivory Coast	Africa Sports	2–0	0–2	2–2 (5–4 p)
2008	CAF Champions League	SR	Angola	Inter de Luanda	3–0	1–2	4–2
2008	CAF Champions League	Group A	Egypt	Al Ahly	2–2	1–2	4th
2008	CAF Champions League	Group A	Zimbabwe	Dynamos	1–0	0–1	4th
2008	CAF Champions League	Group A	Ivory Coast	ASEC Mimosas	0–0	0–3	4th
2011	CAF Champions League	PR	Kenya	Ulinzi Stars	1–0	4–0	5–0
2011	CAF Champions League	FR	Tunisia	Club Africain	w/o	2–4	w/o (Note: The second leg was abandoned in the second half with Zamalek leading 2–1 after fans invaded the pitch. As a result, Zamalek were disqualified from the competition by CAF and Club Africain won on walkover.)
2012	CAF Champions League	PR	Tanzania	Young Africans	1–0	1–1	2–1
2012	CAF Champions League	FR	Ivory Coast	Africa Sports	1–0	1–2	2–2 (a)
2012	CAF Champions League	SR	Morocco	MAS Fez	2–0	2–0	4–0
2012	CAF Champions League	Group B	Ghana	Berekum Chelsea	1–1	2–3	4th
2012	CAF Champions League	Group B	Egypt	Al Ahly	0–1	1–1	4th
2012	CAF Champions League	Group B	DR Congo	TP Mazembe	1–2	0–2	4th
2013	CAF Champions League	PR	Chad	Gazelle	7–0	0–0	7–0
2013	CAF Champions League	FR	DR Congo	AS Vita Club	1–0	0–0	1–0
2013	CAF Champions League	SR	Ethiopia	Saint George	1–1	2–2	3–3 (a)
2013	CAF Champions League	Group B	South Africa	Orlando Pirates	2–1	1–4	3rd
2013	CAF Champions League	Group B	Congo	AC Léopards	4–1	0–1	3rd
2013	CAF Champions League	Group B	Egypt	Al Ahly	1–1	2–4	3rd
2014	CAF Champions League	PR	Niger	AS Douanes Niamey	2–0	1–0	3–0
2014	CAF Champions League	FR	Angola	Kabuscorp	1–0	0–0	1–0
2014	CAF Champions League	SR	Zambia	Nkana	5–0	0–0	5–0
2014	CAF Champions League	Group A	Sudan	Al Hilal	2–1	1–2	4th
2014	CAF Champions League	Group A	DR Congo	TP Mazembe	0–0	0–1	4th
2014	CAF Champions League	Group A	DR Congo	AS Vita Club	0–1	0–1	4th
2015	CAF Confederation Cup	FR	Rwanda	Rayon Sports	3–1	3–0	6–1
2015	CAF Confederation Cup	SR	Morocco	FUS Rabat	0–0	3–2	3–2
2015	CAF Confederation Cup	PO	DR Congo	SM Sanga Balende	3–1	0–1	3–2
2015	CAF Confederation Cup	Group B	Congo	AC Léopards	2–0	0–1	1st
2015	CAF Confederation Cup	Group B	South Africa	Orlando Pirates	4–1	2–1	1st
2015	CAF Confederation Cup	Group B	Tunisia	CS Sfaxien	1–0	3–1	1st
2015	CAF Confederation Cup	SF	Tunisia	Étoile du Sahel	3–0	1–5	4–5
2016	CAF Champions League	FR	Cameroon	Union Douala	2–0	1–0	3–0
2016	CAF Champions League	SR	Algeria	MO Béjaïa	2–0	1–1	3–1
2016	CAF Champions League	Group B	Algeria	ES Sétif	disqualified (Note: The CAF announced on 23 June 2016 that ES Sétif were disqualified from the competition for a pitch invasion and other incidents during their home match against Mamelodi Sundowns. All of their results in the group stage were annulled.)		2nd
2016	CAF Champions League	Group B	South Africa	Mamelodi Sundowns	1–2	0–1	2nd
2016	CAF Champions League	Group B	Nigeria	Enyimba	1–0	1–0	2nd
2016	CAF Champions League	SF	Morocco	Wydad AC	4–0	2–5	6–5
2016	CAF Champions League	Final	South Africa	Mamelodi Sundowns	1–0	0–3	1–3
2017	CAF Champions League	FR	Nigeria	Enugu Rangers	4–1	1–2	5–3
2017	CAF Champions League	Group B	Algeria	USM Alger	1–1	0–2	3rd
2017	CAF Champions League	Group B	Libya	Al Ahli Tripoli	2–2	0–0	3rd
2017	CAF Champions League	Group B	Zimbabwe	CAPS United	2–0	1–3	3rd
2018	CAF Confederation Cup	FR	Ethiopia	Wolaitta Dicha	2–1	1–2	3–3 (3–4 p)
2018–19	CAF Confederation Cup	FR	Chad	AS CotonTchad	7–0	0–2	7–2
2018–19	CAF Confederation Cup	PO	Morocco	Ittihad Tanger	3–1	0–0	3–1
2018–19	CAF Confederation Cup	Group D	Kenya	Gor Mahia	4–0	2–4	1st
2018–19	CAF Confederation Cup	Group D	Algeria	NA Hussein Dey	1–1	0–0	1st
2018–19	CAF Confederation Cup	Group D	Angola	Petro de Luanda	1–1	1–0	1st
2018–19	CAF Confederation Cup	QF	Morocco	Hassania Agadir	1–0	0–0	1–0
2018–19	CAF Confederation Cup	SF	Tunisia	Étoile du Sahel	1–0	0–0	1–0
2018–19	CAF Confederation Cup	Final	Morocco	RS Berkane	1–0	0–1	1–1 (5–3 p)
2019–20	CAF Super Cup	Final	Tunisia	Espérance de Tunis	3–1		
2019–20	CAF Champions League	PR	Somalia	Dekedaha	6–0	7–0	13–0
2019–20	CAF Champions League	FR	Senegal	Génération Foot	1–0	1–2	2–2 (a)
2019–20	CAF Champions League	Group A	Angola	1º de Agosto	2–0	0–0	2nd
2019–20	CAF Champions League	Group A	DR Congo	TP Mazembe	0–0	0–3	2nd
2019–20	CAF Champions League	Group A	Zambia	ZESCO United	2–0	1–1	2nd
2019–20	CAF Champions League	QF	Tunisia	Espérance de Tunis	3–1	0–1	3–2
2019–20	CAF Champions League	SF	Morocco	Raja CA	3–1	1–0	4–1
2019–20	CAF Champions League	Final	Egypt	Al Ahly	1–2		
2020–21	CAF Champions League	FR	Chad	Gazelle	w/o (Note: Gazelle failed to appear for the first leg in Cairo following disputes between the Ministry of Youth and Sports in the country and the Chadian Football Federation, which prevented the club from traveling to Egypt. As a result, Gazelle were disqualified from the competition by CAF, and Zamalek won on walkover.)		
2020–21	CAF Champions League	Group D	Tunisia	Espérance de Tunis	0–1	1–3	3rd
2020–21	CAF Champions League	Group D	Algeria	MC Alger	0–0	2–0	3rd
2020–21	CAF Champions League	Group D	Senegal	Teungueth	4–1	0–0	3rd
2021–22	CAF Champions League	SR	Kenya	Tusker	4–0	1–0	5–0
2021–22	CAF Champions League	Group D	Morocco	Wydad AC	0–1	1–3	3rd
2021–22	CAF Champions League	Group D	Angola	Petro de Luanda	2–2	0–0	3rd
2021–22	CAF Champions League	Group D	Angola	Sagrada Esperança	0–0	0–0	3rd
2022–23	CAF Champions League	FR	Chad	Elect Sport	2–0	2–0	4–0
2022–23	CAF Champions League	SR	Burundi	Flambeau du Centre	5-1	1–0	6-1
2022–23	CAF Champions League	Group D	Algeria	CR Belouizdad	0–1	0–2	3rd
2022–23	CAF Champions League	Group D	Sudan	Al Merrikh	0–0	4–3	3rd
2022–23	CAF Champions League	Group D	Tunisia	Espérance de Tunis	0–2	3–1	3rd
2023–24	CAF Confederation Cup	SR	Djibouti	Arta Solar	4–1	0–2	4–3
2023–24	CAF Confederation Cup	Group B	Libya	Abu Salim	1–0	2–1	1st
2023–24	CAF Confederation Cup	Group B	Guinea	Académie SOAR	4–0	3–0	1st
2023–24	CAF Confederation Cup	Group B	Angola	Sagrada Esperança	1–0	0–0	1st
2023–24	CAF Confederation Cup	QF	Egypt	Modern Future	2–1	1–1	3–2
2023–24	CAF Confederation Cup	SF	Ghana	Dreams FC	3–0	0–0	3–0
2023–24	CAF Confederation Cup	Final	Morocco	RS Berkane	1–0	1–2	2–2 (a)
2024	CAF Super Cup	Final	Egypt	Al Ahly	1–1 (4-3 p)		
2024–25	CAF Confederation Cup	SR	Kenya	Administration Police	2–1	1–0	3–1
2024–25	CAF Confederation Cup	Group D	Egypt	Al Masry SC	1–0	0–0	1st
2024–25	CAF Confederation Cup	Group D	Nigeria	Enyimba F.C.	3–1	2–2	1st
2024–25	CAF Confederation Cup	Group D	Mozambique	Black Bulls	2–0	3–1	1st
2024–25	CAF Confederation Cup	QF	South Africa	Stellenbosch	0–1	0–0	0–1
2025–26	CAF Confederation Cup	SR	Somalia	Dekedaha	1–0	6–0	7–0
2025–26	CAF Confederation Cup	Group D	Egypt	Al Masry SC	0–0	2–1	1st
2025–26	CAF Confederation Cup	Group D	South Africa	Kaizer Chiefs	2–1	1–1	1st
2025–26	CAF Confederation Cup	Group D	Zambia	ZESCO United	1–0	0–1	1st
2025–26	CAF Confederation Cup	QF	Congo	AS Otohô	2–1	1–1	3–2
2025–26	CAF Confederation Cup	SF	Algeria	CR Belouizdad	0–0	1–0	1–0
2025–26	CAF Confederation Cup	Final	Algeria	USM Alger	1–0	0–1	1–1 (7-8 p)

== Statistics by country ==
Statistics correct as of october 25, 2026

Country	Club	P	W	D	L	GF	GA	GD
Algeria	JS Kabylie	2	1	0	1	4	3	+1
Algeria	MC Oran	2	1	1	0	5	1	+4
Algeria	NA Hussein Dey	2	0	2	0	1	1	+0
Algeria	MO Béjaïa	2	1	1	0	3	1	+2
Algeria	MC Alger	2	1	1	0	2	0	+2
Algeria	CR Belouizdad	4	1	1	2	1	3	-2
Algeria	USM Alger	4	1	1	2	2	4	-2
Subtotal		18	6	7	5	18	13	+5
Kabuscorp
Angola	1º de Agosto	2	1	1	0	2	0	+2
Angola	AS Aviacao	2	1	1	0	3	1	+2
Angola	Petro de Luanda	4	1	3	0	4	3	+1
Angola	Inter Luanda	2	1	0	1	4	2	+2
Angola	Kabuscorp	2	1	1	0	1	0	+1
Angola	Sagrada Esperança	4	1	3	0	1	0	+1
Subtotal		16	6	9	1	15	6	+9
Burkina Faso	Rail Club du Kadiogo	2	1	0	1	2	2	+0
Subtotal		2	1	0	1	2	2	+0
Burundi	Vital'O	4	3	0	1	10	4	+6
Burundi	AS Inter Star	2	1	0	1	3	1	+2
Burundi	Flambeau du Centre	2	2	0	0	6	1	+5
Subtotal		8	6	0	2	19	6	+13
Cameroon	Canon Yaoundé	4	2	0	2	7	5	+2
Cameroon	Union Douala	2	2	0	0	3	0	+3
Subtotal		6	4	0	2	10	5	+5
Chad	Gazelle FC	2	1	1	0	7	0	+7
Chad	Elect-Sport FC	2	2	0	0	4	0	+4
Chad	AS CotonTchad	2	1	0	1	7	2	+5
Subtotal		6	4	1	1	18	2	+16
(Republic of the Congo) Congo	AS Otôho	2	1	1	0	3	2	+1
(Republic of the Congo) Congo	AC Léopards	4	2	0	2	6	3	+3
Subtotal		6	3	1	2	9	5	+4
(Democratic Republic of the Congo) DR Congo	TP Mazembe	8	1	3	4	4	9	-5
(Democratic Republic of the Congo) DR Congo	AS Vita Club	4	1	1	2	1	2	-1
(Democratic Republic of the Congo) DR Congo	DC Motema Pembe	1	1	0	0	3	1	+2
(Democratic Republic of the Congo) DR Congo	SM Sanga Balende	2	1	0	1	3	2	+1
Subtotal		15	4	4	7	11	14	-3
Djibouti	AS Arta/Solar7	2	1	0	1	4	3	1
Subtotal		2	1	0	1	4	3	+1
Egypt	Al Ahly SC	11	1	4	6	14	5	−9
Egypt	Al Masry SC	4	2	2	0	3	1	+2
Egypt	Modern Future FC	2	1	1	0	3	2	+2
Egypt	Al Mokawloon Al Arab SC	1	0	1	0	0	0	+0
Subtotal		18	4	8	6	10		−
Ethiopia	Saint George SC	4	1	3	0	6	4	+2
Ethiopia	Ethiopian Coffee SC	2	1	0	1	3	3	+0
Ethiopia	Wolaitta Dicha SC	2	1	0	1	3	3	+0
Ethiopia	Mechal	2	1	0	1	6	2	+4
Subtotal		10	4	3	3	18	12	+6
Gabon	AS Sogara	2	1	1	0	3	2	+1
Subtotal		2	1	1	0	3	2	+1
Ghana	Ashante Kotoko	6						+
Ghana	heart of Oak							-2
Ghana	Dreams FC							+3
Ghana	Berekum Chelsea							-1
Ghana	Obuasi Goldfields							+0
Subtotal								+
Guinea	Académie SOAR	2	2	0	0	7	0	+7
Subtotal		2	2	0	0	7	0	+7
Ivory Coast	ASEC Mimosas	6	2	2	2	6	7	-1
Ivory Coast	Africa Sports	6	3	0	3	6	6	+0
Subtotal		12	5	2	5	12	13	-1
Kenya	Gor Mahia F.C.	6	3	1	2	13	7	+6
Kenya	Administration Police	2	2	0	0	3	1	+2
Kenya	Ulinzi Stars	2	2	0	0	5	0	+5
Kenya	Nzoia Sugar F.C.	2	2	0	0	7	1	+6
Kenya	Tusker F.C.	4	4	0	0	9	1	+8
Subtotal		16	13	1	2	37	10	+27
Libya	Abu Salim SC	2	2	0	0	3	1	+2
Libya	Al-Ahly Tripoli	4	1	2	1	6	4	+2
Subtotal		6	3	2	1	9	5	+4
Mauritius	Sunrise Flacq United	2	1	0	1	4	3	+1
Subtotal		2	1	0	1	4	3	+1
Morocco	AS FAR	2	1	0	1	1	1	+0
Morocco	Raja Casablanca	4	3	1	0	5	1	+4
Morocco	Wydad Casablanca	5	2	0	3	10	10	0
Morocco	COD Meknès	2	1	1	0	4	2	+2
Morocco	MAS Fes	2	2	0	0	4	0	+4
Morocco	FUS Rabat	2	1	1	0	3	2	+1
Morocco	Ittihad Tanger	2	1	1	0	3	1	+2
Morocco	Hassania Agadir	2	1	1	0	1	0	+1
Morocco	RS Berkane	4	2	0	2	3	3	+0
Subtotal		25	14	5	6	34	20	+14
Mozambique	CD Costa do Sol	6	4	0	2	8	5	+3
Mozambique	Black Bulls	4	3	0	1	6	4	+2
Mozambique	Desportivo Maputo	2	1	0	1	5	3	+2
Subtotal		12	8	0	4	19	12	+7
Niger	AS Douanes	2	2	0	0	3	0	+3
Subtotal		2	2	0	0	3	0	+3
Nigeria	shooting Stars S.C.	6	4	0	2	8	5	+3
Nigeria	Enyimba F.C.	4	3	0	1	6	4	+2
Nigeria	Enugu Rangers	2	1	0	1	5	3	+2
Nigeria	stationery Stores F.C.	2	1	0	1	3	2	+1
Nigeria	Kwara United	2	1	0	1	3	2	+1
Subtotal		16	10	0	6	25	16	+9
Réunion	US Stade Tamponnaise	2	1	1	0	3	0	+3
Réunion	SS Saint-Louisienne	2	1	1	0	2	0	+2
Subtotal		4	2	2	0	5	0	+5
Rwanda	Panthères Noires	2	1	1	0	6	2	+4
Rwanda	APR F.C.	6	4	1	1	14	7	+7
Rwanda	Rayon Sports	2	2	0	0	6	1	+5
Subtotal		10	7	2	1	26	10	+16
Senegal	Génération Foot	2	1	0	1	2	2	+0
Senegal	ASEC Ndiambour	2	1	0	1	3	2	+1
Senegal	Teungueth	2	1	1	0	4	1	+3
Subtotal		6	3	1	2	9	5	+4
Somalia	Dekedaha	4	4	0	0	20	0	+20
Subtotal		4	4	0	0	20	0	+20
South Africa	Stellenbosch F.C.	2	0	1	1	0	1	-1
South Africa	Orlando Pirates	4	3	0	1	9	7	+2
South Africa	Mamelodi Sundowns FC	4	1	0	3	2	6	-4
South Africa	kaiser Chiefs	4	2	1	1	5	4	+1
Subtotal		14	6	2	6	16	18	-2
Sudan	Al Hilal							+
Sudan	Al-Mourada SC	2	1	0	1	2	2	0
Sudan	Al Merrikh SC							+
Subtotal								+
Tanzania	Young Africans							+
Tanzania	Simba S.C.							+
Tanzania	Malindi F.C.							+
Subtotal								+
Tunisia	Espérance ST							+
Tunisia	CS Sfaxien							+
Tunisia	Club Africain							+
Tunisia	Es Sahel							+
Subtotal								+
Uganda	simba	1	1	0	0	2	1	+1
Subtotal		1	1	0	0	2	1	+1
Zambia	Nkana F.C.	12	6	4	2	18	5	+13
Zambia	ZESCO United F.C.							+
Zambia	Mufulira Wanderers							+
Subtotal								+
Zimbabwe	Dynamos FC	4	3	0	1	5	2	+3
Zimbabwe	CAPS United	2	1	0	1	3	3	+0
Subtotal		6	4	0	2	8	5	+3
Total								+

== Overall record ==
=== By competition ===
Competition	Pld	W	D	L	GF	GA	GD	Win%
African Cup of Champions Clubs/CAF Champions League	204	99	46	59	309	191	+118	48.53
African Cup Winners' Cup/CAF Confederation Cup	58	32	11	15	95	52	+43	55.17
CAF Cup	10	4	2	4	15	7	+8	40.00
CAF Super Cup	6	3	2	1	7	5	+2	50.00
Total	278	138	61	79	427	255	+172	49.64

== CAF Club rankings ==
Current

CAF	Club	Points
1	(Egypt) Al Ahly	91
2	(Tunisia) Espérance	58
3	(Tunisia) Étoile du Sahel	54
4	(Egypt) Zamalek	50
5	(Democratic Republic of the Congo) TP Mazembe	49
6	(Ghana) Asante Kotoko	44
7	(Ivory Coast) ASEC Mimosas	43
8	(Algeria) JS Kabylie	39
9	(Cameroon) Canon Yaoundé	36
10	(Ghana) Hearts of Oak	31

== Club of the Century ==
In February 2014 administration of Zamalek announced the nickname of the club as the Club of the Century, as the most successful club of the 20th century in Africa (gaining 9 titles versus 7 for its closest rival).

=== CAF ranking of African Clubs titles at the end of 20th century ===
Pos	Club	Titles	Trophies won
1	(Egypt) Zamalek	7 (+2)	4 African Cup of Champions Clubs, 1 CAF Cup Winners' Cup, 2 CAF Super Cup, (2 Afro-Asian Club Championship)
2	(Egypt) Al-Ahly	6 (+1)	2 African Cup of Champions Clubs, 4 CAF Cup Winners' Cups, (1 Afro-Asian Club Championship)
3	(Tunisia) ES Tunis	4 (+1)	1 African Cup of Champions Clubs; 1 CAF Cup Winners' Cup, 1 CAF Cup, 1 CAF Super Cup, (1 Afro-Asian Club Championship)
3	(Morocco) Raja Casablanca	4 (+1)	3 African Cup of Champions Clubs, 1 CAF Super Cup, (1 Afro-Asian Club Championship)
3	(Cameroon) Canon Yaoundé	4	3 African Cup of Champions Clubs, 1 CAF Cup Winners' Cup
3	(Algeria) JS Kabylie	4	2 African Cup of Champions Clubs, 1 CAF Cup Winners' Cup, 1 CAF Cup

=== Ranking of the Century (CAF) ===
ACUC	club Zamalek SC 20th century club ranking	Points
1	(Egypt) Al Ahly	57
2	(Egypt) Zamalek	55
3	(Ghana) Asante Kotoko	34
4	(Cameroon) Canon Yaoundé	34
5	(Tunisia) Espérance Tunis	27
6	(Ivory Coast) ASEC Mimosas	27
7	(Ghana) Hearts of Oak	26
8	(Ivory Coast) Africa Sports	25
9	(Algeria) JS Kabylie	20
10	(Democratic Republic of the Congo) Englebert	19

=== Ranking of the Century (IFFHS) ===
The competition that qualified for points in the ranking are the African Champions Cup (now African Champions League) with the following point awards 4 points for a win 2 points for a draw 0 points for a defeat, The CAF Cup (2 points for a win, 1 point for a draw. 0 points for a defeat), The Cup Winners Cup and the Confederations Cup (3 points for a win 1.5 points for a draw 0 points for a defeat), and the African Super Cup (3.5 points for a win, 1.75 points for a draw, 0 points for a defeat), (IFFHS) didn't calculated the Afro-Asian Super cup, which Zamalek won it for 2 times.

ACUC	club Zamalek SC 20th century club ranking	Points
1	(Ghana) Asante Kotoko	149.0 points
2	(Egypt) Al Ahly	129.5 points
3	(Egypt) Zamalek	126.75 points
