= 1994–95 Egyptian Premier League =

Egyptian Premier League
- Dates: 16 September 1994 – 19 June 1995
- Champions: Al Ahly (24th title)
- Relegated: Aswan; Dina Farms
- African Cup of Champions Clubs: Zamalek (2nd)
- African Cup Winners' Cup: El Mokawloon (Cup Winners)
- Matches played: 181
- Goals scored: 319 (1.76 per match)
- Top goalscorer: Abdullah El-Sawy; Ahmed Sary (10 Goals)

14 teams participated in the 1994–95 Egyptian Premier League season. The first team in the league was the champion, and was supposed to qualify to the African Cup of Champions Clubs, but this did not happen as Al Ahly was boycotting the CAF competitions so the Runner up Zamalek qualified instead. Al Ahly won the league for the 24th time in the club's history.

== League table ==
Pos	Team	Pld	W	D	L	GF	GA	GD	Pts	Qualification or relegation
1	Al Ahly (C)	26	17	7	2	38	13	+25	58	
2	Zamalek	26	13	11	2	29	11	+18	50	1996 African Cup of Champions Clubs
3	Ismaily	26	11	10	5	31	20	+11	43	
4	Al Ittihad	26	9	12	5	30	21	+9	39	
5	El Mokawloon	26	7	13	6	17	15	+2	34	1996 African Cup Winners' Cup
6	Suez	26	7	11	8	14	23	−9	32	
7	Olympic Club	26	7	10	9	25	29	−4	31	
8	Baladeyet El Mahalla	26	6	12	8	23	24	−1	30	
9	Gomhoriat Shebin	26	6	12	8	19	22	−3	30	
10	Al Masry	26	7	8	11	23	31	−8	29	
11	El Qanah	26	5	11	10	19	24	−5	26	
12	Ghazl El Mahalla	26	5	11	10	17	24	−7	26	
13	Aswan	26	6	5	15	18	32	−14	23	Relegation to Egyptian Second Division
14	Dina Farms	26	3	13	10	18	32	−14	22	Relegation to Egyptian Second Division

(C) Champions

== Top goalscorers ==
Rank	Player	Club	Goals
1	(Egypt) Abdullah El-Sawy	El Qanah	10
1	(Egypt) Ahmed Sary	Al Ittihad	10
3	(Egypt) Mohamed Sabry	Zamalek	8
4	(Egypt) Ahmed El-Kass	Olympic Club	7
4	(Egypt) Ibrahim El-Masry	Al Masry	7
