= Ayman Abdel-Aziz =

Egyptian footballer (born 1978)

Ayman
Personal information
- Full name: Ayman Mohamed Abdelaziz
- Date of birth: 28 November 1978 (age 47)
- Place of birth: Sharqia, Egypt
- Height: 1.78 m (5 ft 10 in)
- Position: Midfielder

Team information
- Current team: Zamalek (general coach)

Youth career
- 1990–1995: Al-Alominium

Senior career*
Years	Team	Apps	(Gls)
1995–2000	Zamalek	53	(2)
2000–2002	Kocaelispor	84	(5)
2002–2005	Malatyaspor	56	(0)
2005–2007	Gençlerbirliği	29	(2)
2007–2008	Trabzonspor	32	(2)
2008–2010	Zamalek	9	(0)
2009–2009	→ Konyaspor (loan)	14	(0)
2009–2010	→ Diyarbakırspor (loan)	19	(1)
2010–2011	Çaykur Rizespor	14	(0)
2011–2015	Misr El Makasa	35	(7)
2013	→ Hajer (loan)	9	(0)
2016	El Sharkia		

International career
1999–2004	Egypt	25	(3)

Managerial career
- 2016–2017: El Dakhleya (assistant)
- 2018: Zamalek (assistant)
- 2018–2019: Zamalek
- 2020: Misr Lel Makkasa (assistant)
- 2022–2024: Egypt (assistant)
- 2025: Zamalek (assistant)
- 2025–: Zamalek (general coach)
- * Club domestic league appearances and goals

Ayman Mohamed Abdelaziz (Arabic: أيمن محمد عبد العزيز; born 20 November 1978) is an Egyptian football coach and a former footballer who played as a midfielder. He played for various clubs and the Egypt national team. He had been out of Egypt for a very long time, after playing most of his career in Turkey. He currently works as general coach for Zamalek.

== Playing career ==
Ayman began playing club football with Egyptian side Zamalek in 1997. He moved to Turkey in 2000, where he would win the TFF First League title with Konyaspor. Ayman played club football in Turkey with Süper Lig sides Kocaelispor, Gençlerbirliği and Trabzonspor.

He has Turkish citizenship after long time spent in Turkey with the name Ayman Aziz.

== Balili incident ==
On 12 August 2007, Ayman viciously tackled Sivasspor's Israeli striker Pini Balili. Allegedly, Ayman swore at Balili in Arabic before the tackle and it caused the Sivasspor players to fight with the Trabzonspor players. A spectator then jumped onto the pitch and threw punches. Sivasspor players responded and after that Trabzonspor supporters raided the pitch and the match was stopped.

== Coaching career ==
On 2 February 2020, Ayman joint Misr Lel Makkasa SC as assistant manager, he left the club On 1 March 2020.

In September 2022, he became an assistant to Egypt national team manager Rui Vitória.

== Honours ==
Zamalek

- CAF Champions League: 1996
- CAF Super Cup: 1997
- Afro-Asian Club Championship: 1997
- Egypt Cup: 1999

Kocaelispor

- Turkish Cup: 2002
