= Ibrahim Said =

Ibrahim Said may refer to:

- Ibrahim Said (footballer, born 1979)
- Ibrahim Said (footballer, born 2002)
- Ibrahim Said (artist)
