= 2002 CAF Champions League final =

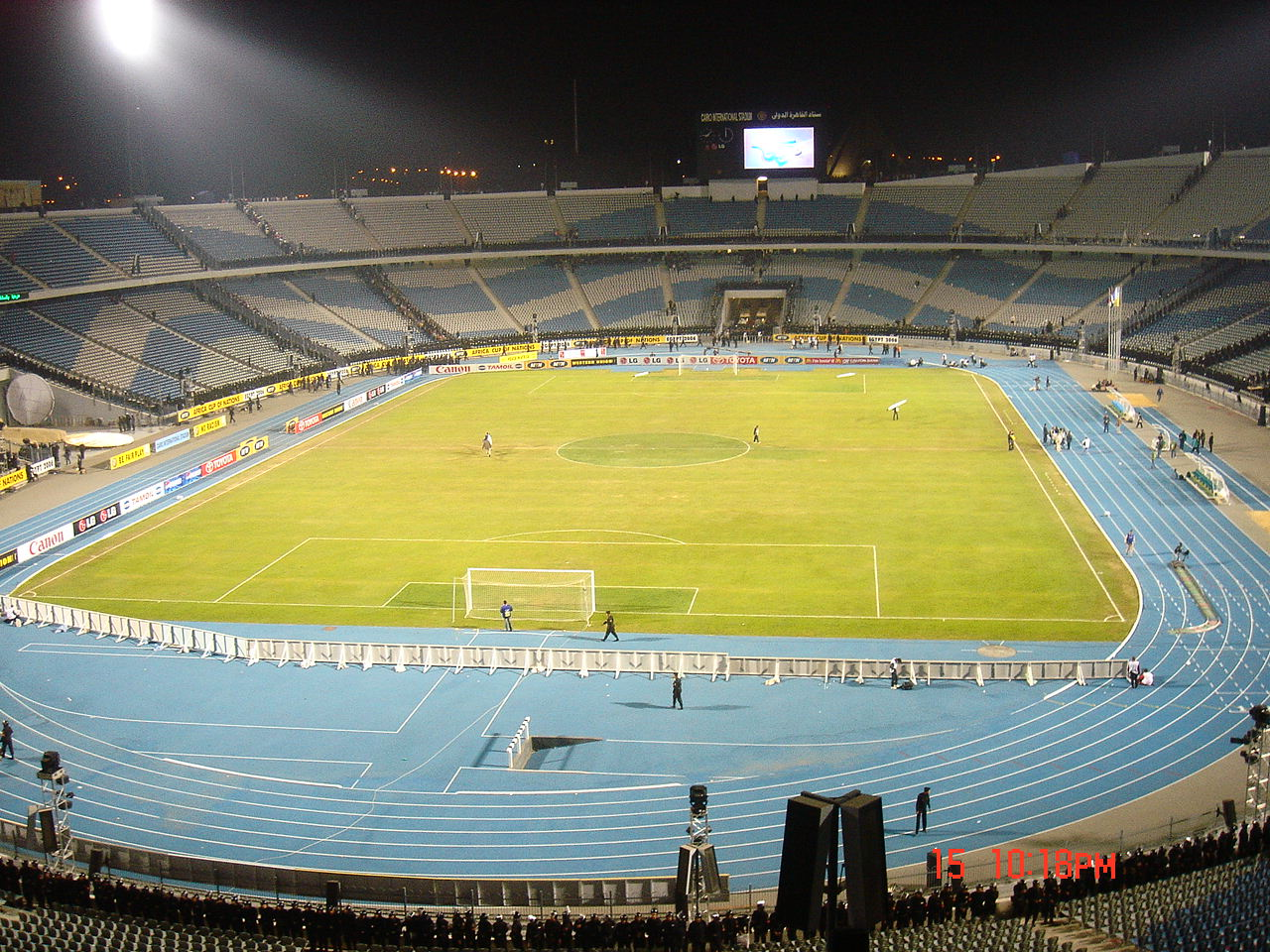
- Cairo International Stadium hosted the podium where Zamalek lifted the trophy
- Event: 2002 CAF Champions League
Raja CA	Zamalek
(Morocco)	(Egypt)
0	1
- Zamalek won 1–0 on aggregate

First leg
Raja CA	Zamalek
0	0
- Date: 30 November 2002
- Venue: Stade Mohamed V, Casablanca
- Referee: Falla N'Doye (Senegal)
- Attendance: 60,000

Second leg
Zamalek	Raja CA
1	0
- Date: 13 December 2002
- Venue: Cairo International Stadium, Cairo
- CAF Man of the Match: Hazem Emam (Zamalek)
- Fans' Man of the Match: Tamer Abdel Hamid (Zamalek)
- Referee: Abdel Hakim Shelmani (Libya)
- Attendance: 67,310
- Weather: Clear; 17 °C (63 °F); 59% humidity

The 2002 CAF Champions League final was a football match that took place on Friday, 13 December 2002 at 17:00 UTC (19:00 local time). The match was played at the Cairo Stadium, in Cairo, Egypt, to determine the winner of the 2002 CAF Champions League. The final was contested by Zamalek and Raja CA. The game was won by Zamalek 1–0 by Abdelhamid's Goal, after a 0–0 draw in Casablanca.

== Qualified teams ==
In the following table, finals until 1996 were in the African Cup of Champions Club era, since 1997 were in the CAF Champions League era.

Team	Region	Previous finals appearances (bold indicates winners)
(Morocco) Raja CA	UNAF (North Africa)	**1989**, **1997**, **1999**
(Egypt) Zamalek	UNAF (North Africa)	**1984**, **1986**, **1993**, 1994, **1996**

== Background ==
Zamalek went into the Champions League final as champions of Egypt for the 11th time, and had lost just one Champions League game, the quarter-final second leg away to ASEC Mimosas. Raja also came first in their league. In the Moroccan League games between the two sides in the Champions League Final, They draw 0–0 at Stade Mohamed V in Casablanca, while Zamalek won 1–0 at Cairo Stadium in the return game on 13 December 2002.

== Venues ==
=== Mohamed V Stadium ===
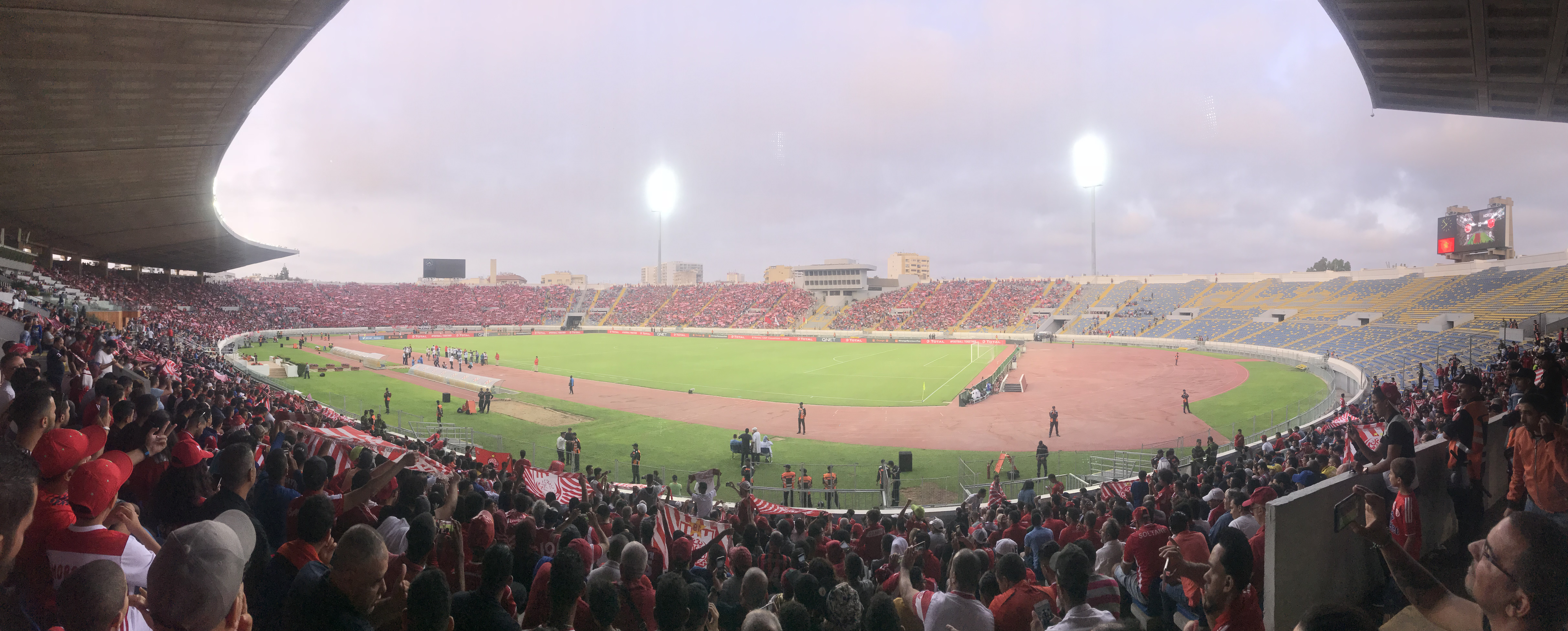
Mohamed V Stadium in Casablanca, Morocco hosted the first leg.

Mohammed V Athletic Complex is situated in the heart of the city of Casablanca, Morocco, in the western part of the Maarif neighborhood. It was inaugurated March 6, 1955, and currently has a capacity of 67,000.

Often hosting the games of the Morocco national football team, the Mohammed V Stadium is equally known as the home of Wydad Casablanca and Raja CA. It is named after King Mohammed V of Morocco.

Mohammed V Stadium is located in the centre of Casablanca. The international airport of Casablanca is 25 kilometres from the stadium, and the Casa-Voyageurs rail station is 5 kilometres from the stadium. The stadium has a parking lot with a capacity of 1,000 cars.

It currently has a semi-artificial lawn of a high standard.

=== Cairo International Stadium ===
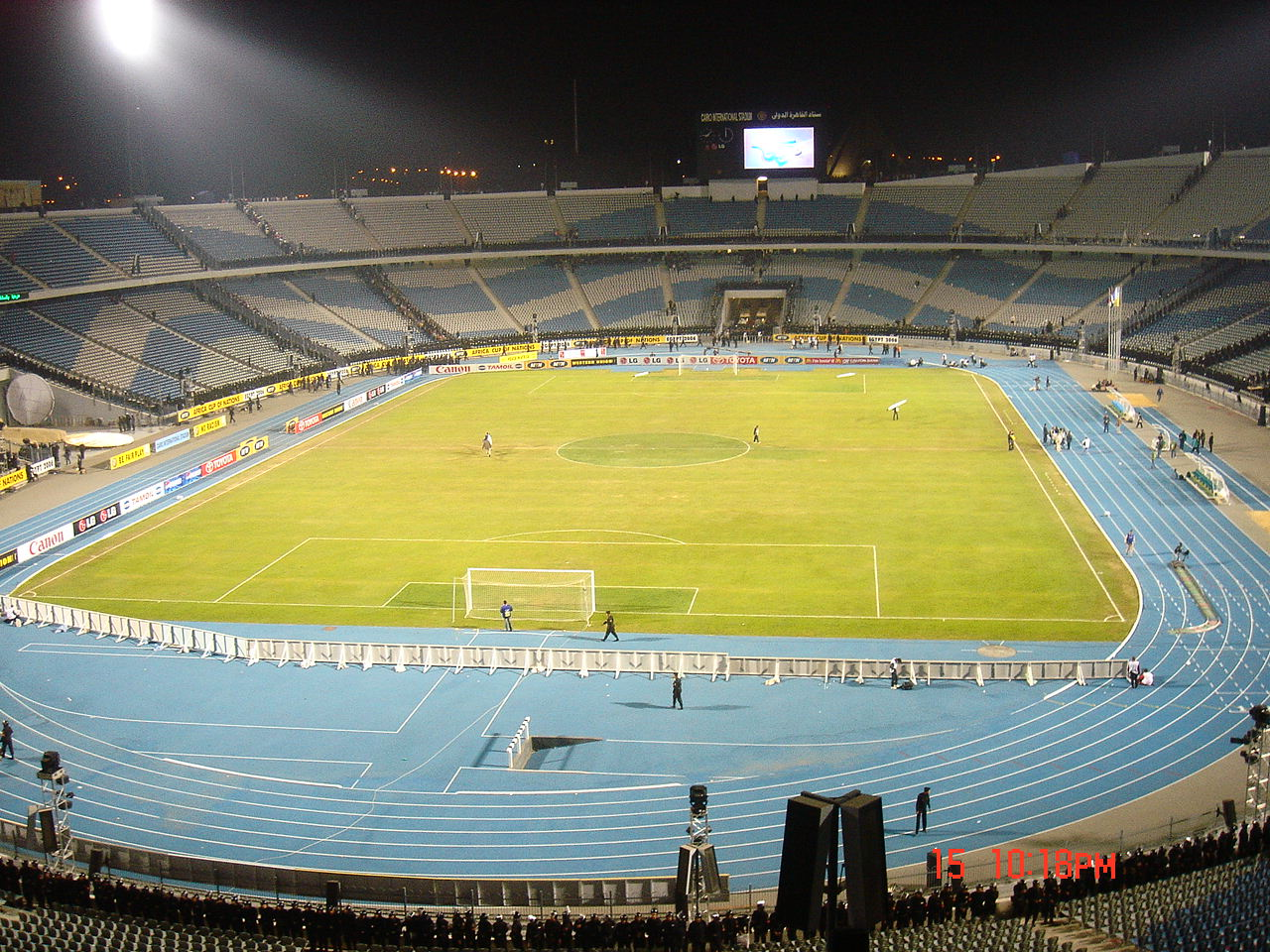
International Stadium in Cairo, Egypt hosted the second leg.

Cairo International Stadium is an Olympic-standard, multi-use stadium with an all-seated capacity of 75,000. The architect of the stadium is the German Werner March, who had built from 1934 to 1936 the Olympic Stadium in Berlin. Before becoming an all seater stadium, it had the ability to hold over 100,000 spectators, reaching a record of 120,000. It is the foremost Olympic-standard facility befitting the role of Cairo, Egypt as the center of events in the region. It is also the 69th largest stadium in the world. Located in Nasr City; a suburb north east of Cairo, it was completed in 1960, and was inaugurated by President Gamal Abd El Nasser on 23 July that year, the eighth anniversary of the Egyptian Revolution of 1952. Zamalek SC currently use the Petro Sport Stadium for most of their home games and Al Ahly use Al Salam Stadium for most of their home games.

== Road to final ==
(Morocco) Raja CA				Round	(Egypt) Zamalek			
Opponent	Agg.	1st leg	2nd leg	Qualifying rounds	Opponent	Agg.	1st leg	2nd leg
(The Gambia) Wallidan FC	5–2	2–1 (H)	3–1 (A)	First round	(Rwanda) APR FC	6–0	6–0 (H)	0–0 (A)
(Republic of the Congo) Étoile du Congo	5–3	3–0 (H)	2–3 (A)	Second round	(Zambia) Nkana FC	3–1	2–0 (H)	1–1 (A)
Opponent	Result			Group stage	Opponent	Result		
(Democratic Republic of the Congo) TP Mazembe	0–2 (A)			Matchday 1	(Ivory Coast) ASEC Mimosas	3–1 (H)		
(Egypt) Al Ahly	2–1 (H)			Matchday 2	(Tunisia) ES Tunis	1–1 (A)		
(Senegal) Jeanne d'Arc	2–1 (A)			Matchday 3	(Mozambique) Costa do Sol	2–0 (A)		
(Senegal) Jeanne d'Arc	2–1 (H)			Matchday 4	(Mozambique) Costa do Sol	3–0 (H)		
(Democratic Republic of the Congo) TP Mazembe	1–0 (H)			Matchday 5	(Ivory Coast) ASEC Mimosas	0–1 (A)		
(Egypt) Al Ahly	3–3 (A)			Matchday 6	(Tunisia) ES Tunis	1–0 (H)		
Group A Winner: Pos / Team / Pld / W / D / L / GF / GA / GD / Pts / Qualification; 1 / (Morocco) Raja Casablanca / 6 / 4 / 1 / 1 / 10 / 8 / +2 / **13** / Advance to knockout stage; 2 / (Democratic Republic of the Congo) TP Mazembe / 6 / 3 / 1 / 2 / 6 / 3 / +3 / **10** / Advance to knockout stage; 3 / (Senegal) Jeanne d'Arc / 6 / 2 / 0 / 4 / 7 / 10 / −3 / **6**; 4 / (Egypt) Al Ahly / 6 / 1 / 2 / 3 / 7 / 9 / −2 / **5**; Source:				Final standings	Group B Winner: Pos / Team / Pld / W / D / L / GF / GA / GD / Pts / Qualification; 1 / (Egypt) Zamalek / 6 / 4 / 1 / 1 / 10 / 3 / +7 / **13** / Advance to knockout stage; 2 / (Ivory Coast) ASEC Mimosas / 6 / 4 / 0 / 2 / 12 / 6 / +6 / **12** / Advance to knockout stage; 3 / (Tunisia) ES Tunis / 6 / 3 / 1 / 2 / 9 / 6 / +3 / **10**; 4 / (Mozambique) Costa do Sol / 6 / 0 / 0 / 6 / 1 / 17 / −16 / **0**; Source:			
Opponent	Agg.	1st leg	2nd leg	Knock-out stage	Opponent	Agg.	1st leg	2nd leg
(Ivory Coast) ASEC Mimosas	4–2	0–2 (A)	4–0 (H)	Semifinals	(Democratic Republic of the Congo) TP Mazembe	3–1	1–1 (A)	2–0 (H)

=== Zamalek ===
In the first knockout round, Zamalek were won against APR FC, against whom they won the Home leg 6–0 while Hossam Hassan, Mohamed Abdel Wahed, Hazem Emam, Gamal Hamza and Mohamed Sabry scored the six goals. The Royal Club then drawn the second leg 0–0 to ensure a 6–0 aggregate win and a place in the second Round, where they were again won against Nkana.

The second Round matches represented the first time these two clubs had met in Africa . Zamalek went to Kitwe and secured a very creditable 2–0 win, before qualify to the Group stage of the Champions League, by drawing 0–0.

Zamalek were drawn in Group F along with ASEC Mimosas, Espérance and Costa do Sol. Zamalek won their first group game before securing a 1–1 draw away against Espérance, Zamalek as group winners and with the most points out of all the group winners, 13.

The semi-final pitted Zamalek against Mazembe; the teams had not met ever in the group stage of the Champions League tournament, the first time Zamalek won it. The first leg at the Stade de la Kenya was a drab affair, with Zamalek spending most of the game defending, whilst Mazembe tried to pass the ball around them. That was about as exciting as the first leg got for either team and it ended 1–1 thanks to a goal from Abdel Halim Ali. The second leg at Cairo Stadium was a game of higher tempo, which Zamalek won 2–0 and Hossam Hassan scored twice. This result increased Zamalek's consecutive home win record in the Champions League to 5 and ensured that Zamalek reached the final unbeaten except losing a match in the quarter-final second leg away against ASEC Mimosas .

== Format ==
The final was decided over two legs, with aggregate goals used to determine the winner. If the sides were level on aggregate after the second leg, the away goals rule would have been applied, and if still level, the tie would have proceeded directly to a penalty shootout (no extra time is played).

== Matches ==
=== First leg ===
30 November 2002
19:00

Raja CA (Morocco)	0–0	(Egypt) Zamalek
	[[[Category:All articles with unsourced statements]] (Report)]

Stade Mohamed V, Casablanca
Attendance: 60,000
Referee: Falla N'Doye (Senegal)

**Raja CA**	**Zamalek**

Raja CA:
GK	1	(Morocco) Mustapha Chadli
CB	4	(Morocco) Abdelouahad Abdessamad
CB	16	(Morocco) El-Amine Erbate
CB	23	(Morocco) Noureddine Kacemi
RM	8	(Morocco) Abdellatif Jrindou
CM	27	(Morocco) Nabil Mesloub
CM	29	(Morocco) Zakaria Aboub	(substituted off) 60'
LM	5	(Burkina Faso) Mohamed Ali Diallo	(substituted off) 77'
CM	20	(Morocco) Hamid Nater
CF	11	(Morocco) Hicham Aboucherouane
CF	9	(Cameroon) François Endene
Substitutes:
CM	24	(Morocco) Sami Tajeddine	(substituted on) 60'
FW	30	(Morocco) Omar Zoubit	(substituted on) 77'
Manager:
(Belgium) Walter Meeuws

Zamalek:
GK	26	(Egypt) Abdel Wahed Al Sayed
RB	2	(Egypt) Ibrahim Hassan
CB	5	(Egypt) Besheer El-Tabei
CB	15	(Egypt) Wael El-Quabbani
CB	1	(Egypt) Mehdat Abdelhadi
LB	13	(Egypt) Tarek El-Sayed
CF	10	(Egypt) Walid Salah Abdel Latif
CM	20	(Egypt) Tamer Abdel Hamid
MF	22	(Egypt) Hossam Abdel Moniem	(yellow card) ?'
CM	11	(Egypt) Mohamed Aboul Ela	(yellow card) ?'
CF	9	(Egypt) Hossam Hassan	(yellow card) ?'	(substituted off) 89'
Substitutes:
FW	24	(Egypt) Abdel Halim Ali		(substituted on) 89'
Manager:
(Brazil) Carlos Roberto Cabral

Assistant referees:
Amadou Diop (Senegal)
Sow Magueye (Senegal)

=== Second leg ===
13 December 2002
17:00 GMT

Zamalek (Egypt)	1–0	(Morocco) Raja CA
Abdel Hamid 45+4'	[[[Category:All articles with unsourced statements]] (Report)]

Cairo International Stadium, Cairo
Attendance: 67,310
Referee: Al-Shelmani (Libya)

**Zamalek**	**Raja CA**

Zamalek:
GK	26	(Egypt) Abdel Wahed Al Sayed
RB	2	(Egypt) Ibrahim Hassan	(yellow card) 40'
CB	1	(Egypt) Mehdat Abdelhadi
CB	5	(Egypt) Besheer El-Tabei
CB	15	(Egypt) Wael El-Quabbani
LB	13	(Egypt) Tarek El-Sayed
CM	20	(Egypt) Tamer Abdel Hamid
CM	11	(Egypt) Mohamed Aboul Ela
CM	14	(Egypt) Hazem Emam (c)		(substituted off) 78'
CF	10	(Egypt) Walid Salah Abdel Latif		(substituted off) 82'
CF	9	(Egypt) Hossam Hassan
Substitutes:
FW	24	(Egypt) Abdel Halim Ali		(substituted on) 82'
MF	22	(Egypt) Hossam Abdel Moniem		(substituted on) 78'
Manager:
(Brazil) Carlos Roberto Cabral

Raja CA:
GK	1	(Morocco) Mustapha Chadli
CB	4	(Morocco) Abdelouahad Abdessamad	(yellow card) 15'
CB	8	(Morocco) Abdellatif Jrindrou	(yellow card) 19'
CB	16	(Morocco) El Amin Erbate		(substituted off) 80'
RM	24	(Morocco) Tajeddine Sami	(yellow card) 58'	(substituted off) 64'
CM	29	(Morocco) Zakaria Aboub
CM	27	(Morocco) Nabil Masloub
LM	23	(Morocco) Noureddine Kacemi	(yellow card) 60'
CM	20	(Morocco) Hamid Nater
CF	9	(Cameroon) François Endene
CF	11	(Morocco) Hicham Aboucherouane
Substitutes:
FW	30	(Morocco) Omar Zoubit		(substituted on) 80'
FW	5	(Burkina Faso) Mohamed Ali Diallo		(substituted on) 64'
Manager:
(Belgium) Walter Meeuws

Assistant referees:
Gamal El-Hawary (Libya)
Khaeri El-Magouri (Libya)
