= Essam Marei =

Egyptian footballer (born 1965)

Personal information
- Date of birth: 1 February 1965 (age 61)
- Position: Midfielder

Senior career*
Years	Team	Apps	(Gls)
?–1991	El-Mokawloon		
1991–1998	Zamalek		

Managerial career
- 2003–2004: Masry (assistant)
- 2005–2006: Zamalek (assistant)
- 2007–2008: Domyat
- 2009–2010: Suez Montakhab
- 2010: Al-Sekka Al-Hadid
- 2010–2011: Al Jabalain
- 2012–2013: Tala'ea El-Gaish (assistant)
- 2014–2015: Aluminium Nag Hammâdi
- 2015–2016: Zamalek (staff)
- 2016–2018: Aluminium Nag Hammâdi
- 2018: Ghazl El Mahalla
- * Club domestic league appearances and goals

Essam Marei (Arabic: عصام مرعي; born 1 February 1965) is an Egyptian former professional footballer who played as a midfielder.

== Honours ==
El-Mokawloon

- Egypt Cup: 1
  1989–90

Zamalek

- Egyptian Premier League: 2
  1991–92, 1992–93
- African Cup of Champions Clubs: 2
  1993, 1996
- CAF Super Cup: 2
  1994, 1997
- Afro-Asian Club Championship: 1
  1997
