= Akram Abdel-Majeed =

Egyptian footballer (born 1970)

Personal information
- Date of birth: 7 July 1970 (age 56)
- Place of birth: Gharbia, Egypt
- Position: Centre forward

Senior career*
| Years | Team | Apps | (Gls) |
| 1995–1997 | Baladeyet El-Mahalla | | |
| 1997–1999 | Zamalek | | |
| 1999–2000 | El-Qanah | | |
| 2000–2001 | Ma'aden | | |
| 2001–2010 | Baladeyet El-Mahalla | | |

International career
| 1993–1997 | Egypt | 5 | (2) |

Managerial career
- 2010: Al-Rebat We Al-Anwar (Asst. manager)
- 2011–2012: Matrouh
- 2013–: Saudi club
- * Club domestic league appearances and goals

Akram Abdel-Majeed (Arabic: أكرم عبدالمجيد; born 7 July 1970) is an Egyptian football manager and former player. He scored 75 goals in the Egyptian Premier League and 80 goals in the Egyptian Second Division.

== Career statistics ==
=== International ===
Scores and results list Egypt's goal tally first, score column indicates score after each Majeed goal.

List of international goals scored by Akram Abdel-Majeed
| No. | Date | Venue | Opponent | Score | Result | Competition |
|---|---|---|---|---|---|---|
| 1 | 20 December 1996 | Cairo International Stadium, Cairo, Egypr | Romania | 1–0 | 3–1 | Friendly |
| 2 | 20 December 1996 | Cairo International Stadium, Cairo, Egypr | Romania | 3–1 | 3–1 | Friendly |

== Honours ==
Zamalek

- Egypt Cup: 1
  1999
- Afro-Asian Club Championship: 1
  1997
