= 1997 Afro-Asian Club Championship =

| Pohang Steelers | Zamalek |
| (South Korea) | (Egypt) |
| 2 | 2 |
- Zamalek won on away goals

First leg
| Pohang Steelers | Zamalek |
| 2 | 1 |
- Date: 16 November 1997
- Venue: Pohang Steel Yard, Pohang
- Referee: Masayoshi Okada (Japan)

Second leg
| Zamalek | Pohang Steelers |
| 1 | 0 |
- Date: 5 December 1997
- Venue: Cairo Stadium, Cairo
- Referee: Mourad Daami (Tunisia)

The 1997 Afro-Asian Club Championship, was the 10th Afro-Asian Club Championship competition endorsed by the Confederation of African Football (CAF) and Asian Football Confederation (AFC), contested between the winners of the African Champions' Cup and the Asian Club Championship.

The final was contested in two-legged home-and-away format between Korean team Pohang Steel the 1996–97 Asian Club Championship winner. and Egyptian team Zamalek, the 1996 African Cup of Champions Clubs winner, The first leg was hosted by Pohang Steel at the Pohang Steel Yard in Pohang on 16 November 1997, while the second leg was hosted by Zamalek at Cairo Stadium in Cairo on 5 December 1997.

Aggregate was 2–2, Zamalek won on away goals, became the first (and only) club to win the Championship for 2 times.

== Teams ==
| Team | Qualification | Previous participation (bold indicates winners) |
|---|---|---|
| (South Korea) Pohang Steelers | 1996–97 Asian Club Championship winner | None |
| (Egypt) Zamalek | 1996 African Cup of Champions Clubs winner | **1987**, 1994 |

== Match details ==
=== First leg ===
16 November 1997
20:00 KST

| Pohang Steelers (South Korea) | 2–1 | (Egypt) Zamalek |
|---|---|---|
| Hwang Sun-hong 7'; Park Tae-ha 53' | | Mostafa 77' |

Pohang Steel Yard, Pohang
Referee: Masayoshi Okada (Japan)

| **Pohang Steelers** | **Zamalek** |

Pohang Steelers:
| GK |
| CB |
| CB |
| CB |
| RM |
| CM |
| CM |
| LM |
| CM |
| CF |
| CF |
Substitutes:
Manager:

Zamalek:
| GK | | (Egypt) Nader El-Sayed |
| RB | | (Egypt) Ayman Abdel-Aziz |
| CB | | (Egypt) Sami El-Sheshini | (substituted off) ?' |
| CB | | (Egypt) Medhat Abdel-Hady |
| CB | | (Egypt) Mohamed El-Kot |
| LB | | (Egypt) Tarek Mostafa |
| CF | **12** | (Egypt) Ismail Youssef (c) |
| CM | | (Egypt) Essam Marei | (substituted off) ?' |
| MF | | (Egypt) Akram Abdel-Majeed | (substituted off) ?' |
| CM | | (Egypt) Ahmed Abdullah |
| CF | | (Egypt) |
Substitutes:
| CB | | (Egypt) Yehia Nabil | (substituted on) ?' |
| MD | | (Egypt) Ahmed Metwali | (substituted on) ?' |
| MF | **17** | (Egypt) Mohamed Sabry | (substituted on) ?' |
Manager:
(Netherlands) Ruud Krol

=== Second leg ===
5 December 1997
20:45 GMT+2

| Zamalek (Egypt) | 1–0 | (South Korea) Pohang Steelers |
|---|---|---|
| Sabry 19' |

Cairo Stadium, Cairo
Referee: Mourad Daami (Tunisia)

| **Zamalek** | **Pohang Steelers** |

Zamalek:
| GK | | (Egypt) Nader El-Sayed |
| CB | | (Egypt) Ayman Abdel-Aziz |
| CB | | (Egypt) Sayed Hanafi |
| LB | | (Egypt) Medhat Abdel-Hady |
| CM | | (Egypt) Yehia Nabil |
| CM | | (Egypt) Mohamed El-Kot |
| RW | **12** | (Egypt) Ismail Youssef (c) |
| AM | **14** | (Egypt) Osama Nabieh |
| AM | **17** | (Egypt) Mohamed Sabry | (substituted off) ?' |
| FW | | (Egypt) Akram Abdel-Majeed | (substituted off) ?' |
| FW | | (Egypt) Ahmed Abdullah | (substituted off) ?' |
Substitutions:
| RW | | (Egypt) Tarek Mostafa | (substituted on) ?' |
| MD | | (Egypt) Ahmed Metwali | (substituted on) ?' |
| MD | | (Egypt) Essam Marei | (substituted on) ?' |
Manager:
(Netherlands) Ruud Krol

Pohang Steelers:
| GK |
| CB |
| CB |
| CB |
| RM |
| CM |
| CM |
| LM |
| CM |
| CF |
| CF |
Substitutes:
Manager:

1997 Afro-Asian Club
Championship winners
(Egypt)
Zamalek
Second title
