= Tarek Mostafa =

Egyptian footballer (born 1971)

Tareq Mustafa
Personal information
- Full name: Tareq Mustafa Mohamed Labib
- Date of birth: 1 April 1971 (age 55)
- Place of birth: Imbaba, Giza, Egypt
- Height: 1.75 m (5 ft 9 in)
- Position: Midfielder

Senior career*
Years	Team	Apps	(Gls)
1989—1990	Aswan SC		
1990—1992	Eastern Company		
1992—1995	Ma'aden		
1995—1999	Zamalek		
1999—2000	Neuchâtel Xamax		
1999—2000	Ankaragücü		
2000—2001	Ismaily SC		
2001—2003	Ma'aden		
2003—2006	Itesalat SC		
2006—2007	Petrojet		
2007—2009	El Gouna FC		

International career
1996—2001	Egypt	34	(2)

Managerial career
- 2008–2009: Suez Cement (Assistant)
- 2009–2010: El-Entag El-Harby (Assistant)
- 2010–2012: Misr El-Makasa (Assistant)
- 2012–2013: Hajer Club (Assistant)
- 2014: Difaâ El Jadidi (Assistant)
- 2014–2015: Difaâ El Jadidi
- 2015: Zamalek (Assistant)
- 2016: Smouha
- 2016–2017: Al Urooba
- 2017: Al-Fujairah
- 2018–2019: Rapide Oued Zem
- 2022-2023: Olympic Club de Safi
- 2026-: Al-Faisaly SC
Medal record
Men's football
Representing Egypt
Africa Cup of Nations
Winner	1998 Burkina Faso
- * Club domestic league appearances and goals

Tareq Mustafa (Arabic: طارق مصطفى; born 1 April 1971) is an Egyptian football manager who currently coaches the Jordanian football club Al-Faisaly SC.

== Career ==
Mustafa started his career in Division II club Eastern Tobacco, notably played for Zamalek SC for a period of four successful years. He also had a spell with Ankaragücü in the Turkish Super Lig. He played for El Gouna FC in Egypt from 2007 to 2009, then he retired.

Mustafa has played for the Egypt national team, participating in the 1998 African Cup of Nations and scoring one of the two winning goals in the final.

== Honours ==
Zamalek

- Caf Champions League: 1996
- Caf Super Cup: 1997
- Afro-Asian Club Championship: 1997
- Egypt Cup: 1999

Egypt

- Africa Cup of Nations: 1998
