= Fayza Rahim =

Egyptian footballer (born 1984)

Fayza Rahim فايزة رحيم (Arabic)
Personal information
- Full name: Fayza Hidar Elnady Rahim
- Date of birth: 12 February 1984 (age 42)
- Position: Midfielder

Senior career*
| Years | Team | Apps | (Gls) |
- Tayaran

International career^{‡}
| 2016 | Egypt | 3 | (0) |

Managerial career
- 2021-: Goldi SC
- * Club domestic league appearances and goals ‡ National team caps and goals as of 25 November 2016.

Fayza Hidar Elnady Rahim (Arabic: فايزة حيدر النادي رحيم; born 12 February 1984) is an Egyptian footballer who plays as a midfielder. She has been a member of the Egypt women's national team.

== Club career ==
Rahim has played for Tayaran in Egypt.

== International career ==
Rahim capped for Egypt at senior level during the 2016 Africa Women Cup of Nations.

== Coaching career ==
On 11 August 2021, Rahim is currently the coach of Goldi SC, becoming the first Egyptian woman to coach a men's club team.
