= 2000 EFA League Cup =

2000 Egyptian League Cup
2000 كأس الدوري المصري

Tournament details
- Dates: 4 Feb 2000 – 26 May 2000
- Teams: 11

Final positions
- Champions: El Qanah (1st title)
- Runners-up: Dina
- Third place: Ma'aden
- Fourth place: Suez

The 2000 Egyptian League Cup, was the first, and only edition of the EFA League Cup. Participation was limited to first-division teams on a voluntary basis. Clubs play without international players (matches played during African Nations' Cup and Olympic qualifiers). Ahly, Mansoura and El Ittihad Alexandria declined to participate.

== Group stage ==
=== Group A ===
Team	Pld	W	D	L	GF	GA	GD	Pts
Dina Farms	5	2	3	0	8	4	+4	9
Suez	5	2	2	1	3	4	-1	8
Zamalek	5	1	4	0	3	2	+1	7
Mokawloon	5	2	0	3	4	5	-1	6
Al-Masry	5	1	2	2	4	2	+2	5
Aluminium	5	0	3	2	1	6	-5	3

=== Group B ===
Team	Pld	W	D	L	GF	GA	GD	Pts
Qanah	4	2	2	0	9	5	+4	8
Ma'aden	4	1	2	1	3	3	0	5
Koroum	4	1	2	1	6	7	-1	5
Ismaily	4	1	2	1	2	3	-1	5
Sharkia	4	0	2	2	2	4	-2	2

== Knock-out stage ==
=== Bracket ===
Semifinals
Suez	1	1	2
El-Qanah	2	3	5
Ma'aden	3	1	4
Dina Farms (a)	3	1	4

Final
El-Qanah	1
Dina Farms	0

=== Semifinals ===
Team 1	Agg.	Team 2	1st leg	2nd leg
Suez	2–5	El-Qanah	1–2	1–3
Ma'aden	4–4(a)	Dina Farms	3–3	1–1

=== Ninth place play-off ===
Team 1	Agg.	Team 2	1st leg	2nd leg
Sharkia	(a)3–3	Al-Masry	0–1	3–2

=== Seventh place play-off ===
Team 1	Agg.	Team 2	1st leg	2nd leg
Ismaily	2–3	Mokawloon	1–1	1–2

=== Fifth place play-off ===
Team 1	Agg.	Team 2	1st leg	2nd leg
Koroum	1–1 (4–3 pen)	Zamalek	0–1	1–0

=== Third place play-off ===
Ma'aden	2 – 0 (Awarded)^{(1)}	Suez

Notes:

- Match ended 1–2, but the result was confirmed as 2–0 in favor of Ma'aden as a result of Suez used ineligible player.

=== Final ===
26 May 2000

El-Qanah	1–0	Dina Farms
Fathi 24'

== Final ranking ==
Rank	Team
1	El-Qanah
2	Dina Farms
3	Ma'aden
4	Suez
5	Koroum
6	Zamalek
7	Mokawloon
8	Ismaily
9	Sharkia
10	Al-Masry
11	Aluminium
