= Mahmoud Abou-Regaila =

Egyptian footballer (born 1941)

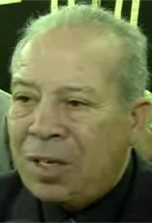

Personal information
- Full name: Mahmoud Abdel-Monem Mahmoud Ali
- Date of birth: 9 September 1941 (age 85)
- Place of birth: Abdeen, Cairo, Egypt
- Position: Centre back

Senior career*
Years	Team	Apps	(Gls)
1959–1966	Zamalek		

International career
- Egypt

Managerial career
- 1970–1971: Al Shabab (Riyadh)
- 1974–1975: Al-Nassr
- 1983–1985: Zamalek
- 1985–1986: Al-Wehda
- 1990–1991: Zamalek
- 1999: Zamalek
- 2000: Aluminium Nag Hammâdi
- 2000–2001: Al-Masry
- 2002: Yemen
- 2003–2004: Al-Ittihad (Aleppo)
- 2006–2007: Sitra
- 2007–2008: Mansoura
- 2008–: Zamalek U-18 (staff)
- * Club domestic league appearances and goals

Mahmoud Abou-Regaila (Arabic: محمود أبو رجيلة; born 9 September 1941), also known as Abo Regala, is an Egyptian former football player and coach of Zamalek. He played on a number of teams, including the Egypt national team. He received honours as a player in the 1965 Pan Arab Games and as a manager in the 1999 Egypt Cup.

== Career ==
Abou-Regaila played for Zamalek throughout his career. Abou-Regaila played for Egypt. He won three Egyptian Premier League titles with Zamalek and two Egypt Cup titles. With his country, he won the 1965 Pan Arab Games.

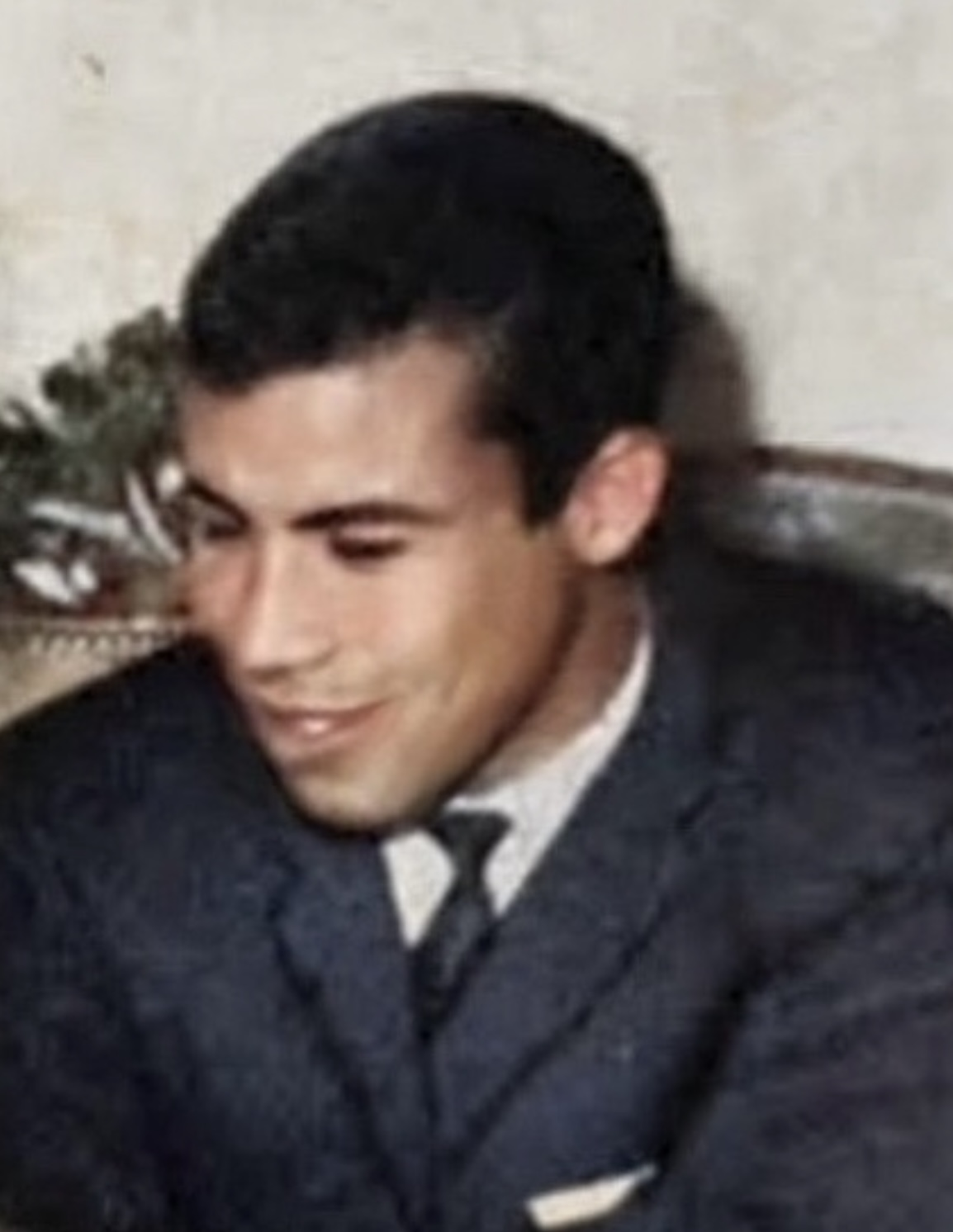
Abou-Regaila in 1964

As a head coach, Abou-Regaila won with Zamalek the 1979 Egypt Cup in his first tenure as head coach of his home team Zamalek. In 1983, he was appointed Zamalek's head coach for the second time, he won the 1983–84 Egyptian Premier League, 1984 African Cup of Champions Clubs and the 1999 Egypt Cup title. With Saudi club Al Nassr, he won the Saudi Professional League in 1975.

== Honours ==
=== Player ===
Zamalek

- Egyptian Premier League: 1959–60, 1963–64, 1964–65
- Egypt Cup: 1959–60, 1961–62

Egypt

- Pan Arab Games: 1965

=== Head coach ===
Al Nassr FC

- Saudi Professional League: 1975

Zamalek

- Egyptian Premier League: 1983–84
- African Cup of Champions Clubs: 1984
- Egypt Cup: 1979, 1999
