= 1997 CAF Super Cup =

Zamalek	Al Mokawloon Al Arab
(Egypt)	(Egypt)
0	0
- Zamalek won 4–2 on penalties
- Date: 14 February 1997
- Venue: Cairo Stadium, Cairo
- Referee: Ahmed El Shenawi (Egypt)
- Attendance: 50,000

The 1997 CAF Super Cup was the fifth CAF Super Cup, an annual football match in Africa organized by the Confederation of African Football (CAF), between the winners of the previous season's two CAF club competitions, the African Cup of Champions Clubs and the African Cup Winners' Cup.

The match took place on 14 February 1997, at Cairo International Stadium in Cairo, Egypt, between Egyptian clubs Zamalek, the 1996 African Cup of Champions Clubs winner, and Al Mokawloon Al Arab, the 1996 African Cup Winners' Cup winner. In the Second all-Egyptian CAF Super Cup, and the second time two clubs from the same country participate the same match in CAF Super Cup (after 1994). Zamalek won the trophy after beating Al Mokawloon Al Arab 4–2 in the penalty shoot-out, with the game ending 0–0.

== Teams ==
Team	Qualification	Previous participation (bold indicates winners)
(Egypt) Zamalek	1996 African Cup of Champions Clubs winner	**1994**
(Egypt) Al Mokawloon Al Arab	1996 African Cup Winners' Cup winner	None

== Match details ==
14 February 1997
15:30

Zamalek (Egypt)	0–0	(Egypt) Al Mokawloon Al Arab
	Report
Penalties
Gamal (penalty scored); Kaci-Saïd (penalty scored); Sabry (penalty scored); El-Kass (penalty scored)	4–2	(penalty missed) Ashour; (penalty scored) Hussein; (penalty scored) El-Aref; (penalty missed) Abd El-Baky

Cairo International Stadium
Attendance: 50,000
Referee: Ahmed El Shenawi (Egypt)

**Zamalek**	**Al Mokawloon Al Arab**

GK		(Egypt) Hussein El-Sayed		(substituted off) 61'
CB		(Egypt) Ashraf Kasem
CB		(Egypt) Medhat Abdel Hady
LB	**13**	(Egypt) Motamed Gamal
CM		(Egypt) Ismail Youssef		(substituted off) 88'
CM		(Egypt) Essam Marei
RW		(Egypt) Tarek Mostafa	(yellow card) 16'
AM		(Egypt) Khaled El-Ghandour		(substituted off) 67'
FW	**17**	(Egypt) Mohamed Sabry
FW		(Egypt) Osama Nabieh
FW		(Egypt) Ayman Mansour
Substitutions:
GK		(Egypt) Nader El-Sayed		(substituted on) 61'
MF		(Algeria) Kamel Kaci-Saïd		(substituted on) 88'
FW	**10**	(Egypt) Ahmed El-Kass		(substituted on) 67'
Manager:
(Germany) Werner Olk & (Germany) Diethelm Ferner

GK	(Egypt) Ahmed Saber	(substituted off) 120'
RB	**6**	(Egypt) Mahmoud El-Aref
CB	(Egypt) Haytham Houssen
CB	(Egypt) Mostafa Marei
LB	(Egypt) Ahmed Said
CM	(Egypt) Mohamed Ouda
CM	(Egypt) Saad Abd El-Baky
RW	**15**	(Egypt) Ali Ashour
AM	(Egypt) Zizo	(yellow card) 45'
LW	(Egypt) Tamer El Nahhas	(yellow card) 95'	(substituted off) 110'
CF	(Egypt) Kofta	(substituted off) 87'
Substitutions:
GK	(Egypt) Mamdouh Ibrahim	(substituted on) 120'
MF	**10**	(Egypt) Abdel Sattar Sabry	(substituted on) 87'
FW	(Egypt) Atef Abdel Hady	(substituted on) 110'
Manager:
(Germany) Michael Krüger

Man of the Match:

Assistant referees:

Fourth official:
