= Dina Farms FC =

Egyptian football club

Dina Farms
- Full name: Al-Ittihad Othman (until 1998); Mazarea Dina (1998-2001)
- Ground: Dina Farms Sports Complex
- League: Egyptian Premier League (last time in 2000-01 season)
- 2000-01: 12th (relegated)
Home colours	Away colours

Mazarea Dina FC (Egyptian Arabic: مَزَارِعْ دِيْنَا) is an Egyptian football club based in Cairo. The club competed in the Egyptian Premier League from 1994 to 2001, when it was relegated. The club belonged to the company Dina Farms, one of the largest dairy companies in Egypt. It was founded under the name Al-Ittihad Othman (Arabic: اْلِاتِّحَادْ عُثْمَانْ), and was changed to the current name in 1998.

== Best achievements ==
- Egyptian League Cup

2000 – Runner-up

== Egyptian Premier League ==
Participations: 6 times
Seasons participated: 1994-95 and 1996-97 to 2000-2001
Total matches played: 164
Wins: 43
Draws: 57
Losses: 64
Goals scored: 157
Goals against: 202
Goal difference: -45
Points: 186
Best finish: 6th place in 1998-99 and in 1999-2000

== Positions ==
- Egyptian Premier League

1994-95 – 14th (relegated)
1996-97 – 8th
1997-98 – 11th
1998-99 – 6th
1999-2000 – 6th
2000-2001 – 12th (relegated)

== Managers ==
- (Egypt) Ahmed Rifaat (1998–2001)
- (Egypt) Hassan Shehata (2001–2001)
- (Egypt) Amro El-Faowal (2013)
