= Abiodun Baruwa =

Nigerian footballer

Personal information
- Date of birth: 16 November 1974 (age 51)
- Place of birth: Abuja, Nigeria
- Height: 1.80 m (5 ft 11 in)
- Position: Goalkeeper

Senior career*
Years	Team	Apps	(Gls)
1991–1992	Kano Pillars		
1993–1994	Iwuanyanwu Nationale		
1995–1997	Shooting Stars FC		
1997–1998	FC Sion	1	(0)
1998–2001	Sturm Graz	1	(0)
2003	Barry Town	11	(0)
2003–2004	Dagenham & Redbridge	1	(0)
2004–2005	Hornchurch		

International career
1997–1998	Nigeria	5	(0)
- * Club domestic league appearances and goals

Abiodun Baruwa (born 16 November 1974) is a Nigerian former professional footballer who played as a goalkeeper.

== Club career ==
Born in Abuja, Baruwa started his career at Kano Pillars. He also had spells with Iwuanyanwu Nationale and Shooting Stars FC, being the first choice goalkeeper during 1996 African Cup of Champions Clubs where his club was the runner-up after losing to Zamalek on penalties.

In 1997, Baruwa was bought by Sion, where he was a backup to Fabrice Borer. In the next season, he moved to Sturm Graz only appearing once as a reserve for Kazimierz Sidorczuk. He stayed with the club until 2001 without making any further appearance and being relegated to third-choice after Josef Schicklgruber was appointed the first choice.

In January 2003, Baruwa was signed by Barry Town on a short-term deal, winning both 2002–03 Welsh Premier League and 2002–03 Welsh Cup. During his stay, in a match against Bangor City, he suffered racial abuse and was confronted by an opposition fan on the pitch.

After failing to get a work permit for the 2003–04 season, Baruwa left Barry Town and in October 2003 joined Dagenham & Redbridge. Also without a work permit, he could not be paid by the Conference National club. Unable to oust Tony Roberts from the starting side, Baruwa made a single Conference appearance as a substitute in September 2004, before being released the same month.

In the same year, Baruwa was signed by Conference South side Hornchurch, making a single appearance at a 5–2 loss against Boston United in a FA Cup match on 13 November 2004.

== International career ==
Baruwa was a stand-by player for Nigeria under-23 at the 1996 Summer Olympics when his team won the gold medal. With the Nigeria national team, he was selected for the 1998 FIFA World Cup.

== Age controversy ==
Zimbabwe alleged that Baruwa, who played during 1996 Summer Olympics qualification, was in fact born on 7 February 1969 as stated in a match program from 1991 Nigerian FA Cup final when Baruwa was a Kano Pillars player. Nigeria faced disqualification from the Olympic Games, but FIFA turned down the Zimbabwe allegation. During his stint at Barry Town, he was cited as a 33-year-old goalkeeper, meaning he was born in 1969.

== Honours ==
Iwuanyanwu Nationale

- Nigerian Premier League: 1993

Shooting Stars

- Nigerian Premier League: 1995

Sturm Graz

- Austrian Football Bundesliga: 1998–99
- ÖFB-Cup: 1998–99
- Austrian Supercup: 1998, 1999

Barry Town

- Welsh Premier League: 2002–03
- Welsh Cup 2002–03

Nigeria

- Summer Olympics: 1996 (stand-by player)
