= Ibrahim Said (footballer, born 1979) =

Egyptian footballer

ابراهيم سعيد
Personal information
- Full name: Ibrahim Said
- Date of birth: 16 October 1979 (age 47)
- Place of birth: Cairo, Egypt
- Height: 1.84 m (6 ft 0 in)
- Position: Centre back

Youth career
- Al Ahly

Senior career*
Years	Team	Apps	(Gls)
1998–2004	Al Ahly	76	(18)
2003–2003	→ Everton (loan)	0	(0)
2004–2007	Zamalek	27	(4)
2007–2008	Çaykur Rizespor	15	(1)
2007–2008	→ Ankaragücü (loan)	9	(0)
2008–2009	Ismaily	9	(1)
2009–2010	Al Ahli Tripoli	12	(0)
2010–2011	Al Ittihad Alexandria	3	(0)

International career
2000–2008	Egypt	50	(2)

Managerial career
- 2016: Goldi (player-manager)
- * Club domestic league appearances and goals

Ibrahim Said (Arabic: إبراهيم سعيد; born 16 October 1979) is an Egyptian retired professional footballer who played as a centre back.

== Career ==
=== In Egypt ===
Said began his career at Al Ahly. In late 2002 he was loaned to English Premier League side Everton, however he left the club in April 2003 having not made an appearance for them.

After a long lay-off away from the playing field, Said slowly but surely started to prove just how talented he was, and became one of the key members of the Zamalek squad. Thanks to his good form with Zamalek, "Heema"(as fans refer to him as) was called up to the Egyptian national team in the run-up to the 2006 African Nations Cup which was to be played in Egypt. Said made some remarkable performances in the tournament, shoring up the Egyptian defensive line as a sweeper & stopper.

=== In Turkey ===
The opening of the 2007 winter transfer window saw Said move to Turkey, joining Caykur Rizespor. In summer the same year, Said was signed by Ankaragücü in light of his success at Caykur Rizespor.

=== Back To Egypt ===
At the start of the 2008–09 season, Said joined Egyptian Side Ismaily. But due to disagreement with the board, He terminated his Contract.

=== In Libya ===
At the 2009–10 season, Said joined Al-Ahly Tripoli club.

=== North America ===
With the help of the goalkeeping coach Zaki Abdul Fattah in the United States, Said went on a 14-day trial with Toronto FC. He played 3 pre-season matches with the Canadian team, but due to disagreement on financial issues, he decided not to sign for them. He moved back to New York City, although Philadelphia Union offered him a contract, he decided to not sign for them as well, then he moved back to Egypt.

=== Return to Egypt with Al-Ittihad Al-Sakandary ===
He returned to Egypt at the beginning of the 2010–11 season joining Al-Ittihad Al-Sakndary but following a dispute with then Head Coach Carlos Cabral he was sidelined for the majority of the first half of the season but returned after Cabral 's resignation in a match against former club Al Ahly.

== Manager career ==
=== Goldi SC ===
In January 2016, he was signed as a player-manager for Egyptian Third Division side Goldi.

== Career statistics ==
=== International goals ===
Scores and results list Egypt's goal tally first:

#	Date	Venue	Opponent	Score	Result	Competition
1.	24 February 2001	Sam Nujoma Stadium, Windhoek, Namibia	Namibia	1–1	1–1	2002 FIFA World Cup qualifier
2.	17 June 2001	Stade Félix Houphouët-Boigny, Abidjan, Ivory Coast	Ivory Coast	2–2	2–2	2002 African Cup of Nations qualifier

== Titles ==
Club

Al Ahly

- Egyptian Premier League: 1998–99, 1999–2000
- Egypt Cup: 2000–01, 2002–03
- CAF Champions League: 2001
- CAF Super Cup: 2002

International

Egypt

- Africa Cup of Nations: 2006, 2008
- Pan Arab Games Gold Medal: 2007

== Sources ==
- Short Bio on Said's short stay at Everton
- Ibrahim Said at National-Football-Teams.com
