= Emmanuel Teberen =

Nigerian footballer

Personal information
- Date of birth: 17 June 1974 (age 52)
- Place of birth: Abuja, Nigeria
- Position: Defender

Senior career*
Years	Team	Apps	(Gls)
1995–1997	Shooting Stars		
1997–1999	Altay	43	(0)
1999–2000	Julius Berger		
- * Club domestic league appearances and goals

Emmanuel Teberen (born 17 June 1974) is a Nigerian former professional footballer who played as a defender.
