= Ibrahim Said (artist) =

Egyptian artist (born 1976)

- Born: 1976 (age 49–50); Fustat, Cairo, Egypt
- Known for: Sculpture, ceramics, pottery
- Spouse: Mariam Aziz Stephan
- Website: https://www.ibrahimsaidceramic.com/

Ibrahim Said (born 1976), is an Egyptian artist living in the United States. He works primarily with earthenware. His sculptures draw on traditional Egyptian forms and Islamic geometric patterns and architecture.

== Biography ==
Ibrahim Said grew up in Fustat, an area of Cairo, Egypt. His father, Said Hamed Marei Shaker, was a production and technical potter whom Ibrahim Said considers his most influential teacher. Said spent his childhood surrounded by pottery and, around the age of 6, began hand-building and carving for fun in his father's studio. As a teen, he worked as a commercial potter to financially help his family, but was uninterested in mass-produced pottery and creating work for others. He strove to further develop his skills beyond what other technical potters could reproduce and create something uniquely his own.

In 2002, Said left Egypt for the first time to participate in a craft fair in Belgium. In 2012, Said emigrated to North Carolina.

== Art ==
Ibrahim Said uses a combination of wheel thrown and hand built construction. Objects he creates are fluid in nature, with parts separating and reconnecting. Over time, Said has constructed larger works and pushes the material limit of clay. The sleek forms he creates have intricately carved patterns on their surface. When looking at his body of work, Said often uses black, blue, and green glazes while leaving the natural clay body to be visible in the carved sections of his work.

He is represented by Yossi Milo Gallery.

=== Influences ===
In his youth, Said began visiting and drawing silhouettes of vases from the Egyptian Museum in Cairo as a way to self-educate through emulation. His forms are inspired by vases found in the Naqada III period. The intricate patterns carved on the surface of his forms are inspired by carvings from Islamic water jugs.

=== Collections ===
Ibrahim Said's work has been collected by numerous museums, most notably his work can be found in the Victoria & Albert Museum, The Mint Museum, the Kalamazoo Institute of Arts, and the Smithsonian American Art Museum.

=== Awards ===
Ibrahim Said has received many awards; the most recent is the Maxwell Hanrahan Foundation Award in Craft in 2024 and the Willard L. Metcalf Award in Art from the American Academy of Arts and Letters in 2020.
