= 2000 African Cup Winners' Cup final =

2000 CAF African Cup Winners' Cup Final
- Event: 2000 African Cup Winners' Cup
Zamalek	Canon Yaoundé
(Egypt)	(Cameroon)
4	3
- Zamalek won 4–3 on aggergate

First leg
Zamalek	Canon Yaoundé
4	1
- Date: 26 November 2000
- Venue: Cairo Stadium, Cairo
- Referee: Abderrahim El-Arjoun (Morocco)
- Attendance: 50,000

Second leg
Canon Yaoundé	Zamalek
2	0
- Date: 10 December 2000
- Venue: Stade Ahmadou Ahidjo, Yaoundé
- Referee: Zeli Sinko (Ivory Coast)
- Attendance: 60,000

The 2000 CAF African Cup Winners' Cup Final was contested in two-legged home-and-away format between Zamalek and Canon Yaoundé, The first leg was hosted by Zamalek at Cairo Stadium in Cairo on 26 November 2000, while the second leg was hosted by Canon Yaoundé at Stade Ahmadou Ahidjo in Yaoundé on 10 December 2000.

Zamalek won 4–3 on aggregate, earned the right to represent the CAF at the 2001 FIFA Club World Championship, as well as participate in the 2001 CAF Super Cup against Hearts of Oak; the winner of the 2000 CAF Champions League.

== Road to final ==
(Egypt) Zamalek				Round	(Cameroon) Canon Yaoundé			
Opponent	Agg.	1st leg	2nd leg	2000 African Cup Winners' Cup	Opponent	Agg.	1st leg	2nd leg
Bye				Preliminary round	Bye			
(Tanzania) Young Africans	5–1	1–1 (A)	4–0 (H)	First round	(Kenya) Coastal Stars	4–0	1–0 (A)	3–0 (H)
(Ethiopia) Coffee FC	3–3 (4-2 pen)	2–1 (H)	1–2 (A)	Second round	(Zambia) Zamsure	5–1	4–1 (H)	1–0 (A)
(Senegal) ASC Ndiambour	3–2	3–1 (H)	0–1 (A)	Quarter-finals	(Republic of the Congo) Étoile du Congo	5–2	3–0 (A)	2–2 (H)
(Réunion) SS Saint-Louisienne	2–0	2–0 (H)	0–0 (A)	Semi-finals	(Libya) Al-Ittihad	2–1	1–1 (A)	1–0 (H)

== Match details ==
=== First leg ===
26 November 2000

Zamalek (Egypt)	4 – 1	(Cameroon) Canon Yaoundé
Abdel-Moneim 26'; El-Said 31' (pen.); Bassiouny 51'; El-Doumany 79'	[[[Category:All articles with unsourced statements]] (Report)]	Mebenga 9'

Cairo Stadium, Cairo
Attendance: 50,000
Referee: Abderrahim El-Arjoun (Morocco)

Man of the Match:

Assistant referees:
Abdel-Majeed Al-Haddadi (Morocco)
Abdel-Aziz Wahby (Morocco)

Fourth official:
Nader Abdel-Maksoud (Egypt)

=== Second leg ===
10 December 2000

Canon Yaoundé (Cameroon)	2 – 0	(Egypt) Zamalek
Tchameni 72'; Batang 90'	[[[Category:All articles with unsourced statements]] (Report)]

Stade Ahmadou Ahidjo, Yaoundé
Attendance: 60,000
Referee: Zeli Sinko (Ivory Coast)
