= 1999 Egypt Cup final =

- Event: 1998–99 Egypt Cup
Zamalek	Ismaily
3	1
- Date: 28 May 1999
- Venue: Cairo Stadium, Cairo
- Referee: Alfredo Trentalange (Italy)
- Attendance: 50,000

1999 Egypt Cup final, was the final match of 1998–99 Egypt Cup, when Zamalek played Ismaily at Cairo Stadium in Cairo.

Zamalek won the game 3–1, claiming the cup for the 19th time.

== Route to the final ==
Zamalek		Round	Ismaily
Opponent	Result	1998–99 Egypt Cup	Opponent	Result
West Quantara	6–0	Round of 32	Qanah	3–1
Gazl Port Said	6–0	Round of 16	Beni Suef	2–1
Dina Farms	5–1	Quarterfinals	Koroum	1–1 (4–3 p)
Mansoura	2–0	Semi-finals	Moqaouloun El Arab	1–0

== Game description ==
=== Match details ===
28 May 1999

Zamalek	3 – 1	Ismaily
Abdel-Moneim 39'; El-Sheshini 83'; El-Said 90+2'	[[[Category:All articles with unsourced statements]] Report]	Abo Greisha 30'

Cairo Stadium
Attendance: 50,000
Referee: Alfredo Trentalange (Italy)

Zamalek	Ismaily

Zamalek:
GK	26	(Egypt) Abdel-Wahed El-Sayed
RB	2	(Egypt) Amr Fahim	(substituted off) 76'
CB	6	(Egypt) Sami El-Sheshini
CB	22	(Egypt) Hossam Abdel-Moneim
LB	5	(Egypt) Besheer El-Tabei
CM	13	(Egypt) Tarek El-Sayed
CM	7	(Egypt) Mohamed Kamouna
RW	8	(Egypt) Ayman Abdel-Aziz
AM	13	(Egypt) Tarek El-Said
LW		(Egypt) Ahmed Abdullah
CF	19	(Egypt) Abdel-Latif El-Doumany	(substituted off) 60'
Substitutions:
CF		(Egypt) Abdul-Hamid Bassiouny	(substituted in) 60'
DF	14	(Egypt) Osama Nabih	(substituted in) 76'
Manager:
(Egypt) Mahmoud Abou-Regaila

Ismaily:
GK	(Benin) Jonas Bidé
RB	(Egypt) Ahmed Ragab
CB	(Egypt) Emad El-Nahhas
CB	(Egypt) Mohamed Younis
LB	(Egypt) Ayman Ramadan
CM	(Egypt) Ahmed Sami
CM	(Egypt) Mohamed Hommos		(substituted off) 70'
RW	(Egypt) Sayed Moawad		(substituted off) 91'
AM	(Egypt) Hamam Ibrahim		(substituted off) 46'
LW	(Egypt) Khaled Bebo	(red card) 75'
CF	(Egypt) Mohamed Salah Abo Greisha
Substitutions:
CM	(Egypt) Magdy Tolba	(yellow card) ?'	(substituted in) 46'
CM	(Egypt) Mohamed Fikry El-Sagheer		(substituted in) 70'
MF	(Egypt) Ahmed El-Gamal		(substituted in) 91'
Manager:
(Egypt) Taha Ismail

Man of the Match:

Assistant referees:

Fourth official:
