= Yehia Nabil Khaled =

Egyptian footballer (born 1971)

Personal information
- Date of birth: 4 September 1971 (age 55)
- Position: Defender

Senior career*
Years	Team	Apps	(Gls)
- Zamalek SC

International career
- Egypt
- * Club domestic league appearances and goals

Yehia Nabil Khaled (born 4 September 1971) is an Egyptian former footballer. He competed in the men's tournament at the 1992 Summer Olympics in Barcelona, Spain.
