= Nader El-Sayed =

Egyptian footballer (born 1972)

Nader El Sayed
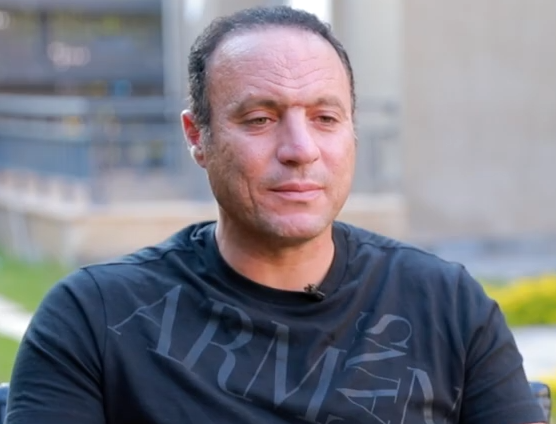

Personal information
- Date of birth: 31 December 1972 (age 53)
- Place of birth: Dakahlia, Egypt
- Height: 1.84 m (6 ft 0 in)
- Position: Goalkeeper

Youth career
- Dikirnis

Senior career*
| Years | Team | Apps | (Gls) |
| 1992–1998 | Zamalek | 103 | (0) |
| 1998–2000 | Club Brugge | 29 | (0) |
| 2000–2002 | Goldi | 20 | (0) |
| 2002–2003 | Akratitos | 17 | (0) |
| 2003–2004 | Al Ittihad Alexandria | 16 | (0) |
| 2004–2005 | Al Masry | 27 | (0) |
| 2005–2006 | Al Ahly | 2 | (0) |
| 2007–2008 | ENPPI | 4 | (0) |

International career
| 1992–2005 | Egypt | 110 | (0) |
- * Club domestic league appearances and goals

Nader El-Sayed (Arabic: نَادِر السَّيِّد; born 31 December 1972) is an Egyptian retired professional footballer who played as a goalkeeper.

== Club career ==
He was widely recognized for the first time as goalkeeper for notable Egyptian club El Zamalek. After showing some classy performances for his club, he took the chance to move to Club Brugge in the Belgian League in 1998. After failing to reserve a starting place with his team, he decided to try his luck with Akratitos in the Super League Greece.

Nader participated with Al Ahly in the 2005 FIFA Club World Championship 5th place playoff against Sydney F.C. in Tokyo, the match which Sydney won 2–1.

On 9 January 2007 it was announced that Nader transferred to ENPPI after failing to reserve a starting place in Al Ahly.

== International career ==
He used to play for Egypt national team until 2005, where he lost his place due to his irregular participating with Al Ahly. His last national game was against Ivory Coast away, ended with a loss for guests 2–0. This match was in 2006 World Cup Qualifiers. Nader's first national game was against Jordan ended with a draw 1–1.

Nader was the Captain of Egyptian team at the 1992 Summer Olympics in Barcelona and participated in 1991 FIFA World Youth Championship in Portugal.

Also, he was the first Egyptian goalkeeper to be chosen twice as best keeper in African Cup of Nations since 1957. He had chosen in Burkina Faso 1998 and Ghana and Nigeria 2000 .

== Honours ==
National Team

- Winner of African Cup of Nations Burkina Faso 1998.
- Winner of Arab Cup of Nations 1992.
- Winner of African Youth Championship 1991.

Zamalek

- African Cup of Champions Clubs: 2
  1993, 1996
- CAF Super Cup: 2
  1994, 1997
- Egyptian League: 2
  1991–92, 1992–93
- Afro-Asian Cup: 1
  1997

Ahly

- CAF Champions League 2005
- CAF Champions League 2006
- Egyptian League (2005/2006)
- Egyptian Soccer Cup (2005/2006)
- Egyptian Super Cup 2005/2006
- African Super Cup 2006.

Individual

- Two times Best African goalkeeper in African Cup of Nations1998 & 2000.
- Best goalkeeper in African Youth Nation Cup 1991
- Best Arab goalkeeper 1992
- Best Egyptian goalkeeper 1992–1998

== Penalty shootouts ==
Nader is famous for saving penalty kicks. He saved 21 kicks in penalty shoot-outs, winning many tournaments for his country and his club.

== See also ==
- List of men's footballers with 100 or more international caps
