= Mohamed Sabry =

Egyptian footballer (1974–2025)

Personal information
- Date of birth: 7 April 1974
- Place of birth: Egypt
- Date of death: 14 November 2025 (aged 51)
- Place of death: Cairo, Egypt
- Position: Midfielder

Youth career
- 1992–1994: Zamalek

Senior career*
Years	Team	Apps	(Gls)
1994–2003	Zamalek	250	
1999	→ Kazma (loan)		
2004–2005	Ittihad Alexandria		

International career
1995–1998	Egypt	8	(0)

Managerial career
- 2008–2009: Itesalat (Staff)
- 2013–2014: Nabarouh
- 2014–2015: Beni Ebeid
- 2015: Samnood
- * Club domestic league appearances and goals

Mohamed Sabry (Arabic: محمد صبري; 7 April 1974 – 14 November 2025) was an Egyptian football midfielder who played for Zamalek, Kazma and Ittihad Alexandria. He died in a traffic collision on 14 November 2025, at the age of 51.

== Honours ==
Zamalek

- Egyptian Premier League: 2000-01, 2002-03
- Egypt Cup: 1999, 2002
- Egyptian Super Cup: 2001, 2002, 2003
- Egyptian Confederation Cup: 1995
- CAF Champions League: 1996, 2002
- African Cup Winners' Cup: 2000
- CAF Super Cup: 1994, 1997
- Afro-Asian Cup: 1997
