= Noureddine Kacemi =

Moroccan footballer

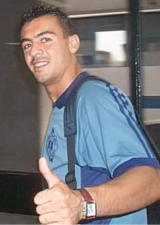

Personal information
- Date of birth: October 17, 1977 (age 49)
- Place of birth: Mohammédia, Morocco
- Height: 1.77 m (5 ft 10 in)
- Position: Defender

Senior career*
Years	Team	Apps	(Gls)
1996–2000	Chabab Mohammédia		
2000–2004	Raja Casablanca		
2004–2005	FC Istres	17	(0)
2005–2007	Grenoble Foot 38	12	(0)
2007–	FAR Rabat		

International career
2001–2006	Morocco	20	(2)
- * Club domestic league appearances and goals

Noureddine Kacemi (Arabic: نور الدين قاسمي) is a Moroccan former football defender. He last played for FAR Rabat.

Kacemi played for Morocco at the 2000 Summer Olympics.

== Career statistics ==
=== International goals ===
#	Date	Venue	Opponent	Score	Result	Competition
1.	21 August 2002	Stade Josy Barthel, Luxembourg City, Luxembourg	Luxembourg	0–2	Win	Friendly
2.	13 October 2002	Prince Moulay Abdellah Stadium, Rabat, Morocco	Equatorial Guinea	5–0	Win	2004 ACN qualification
Correct as of 13 January 2015
