= Osama Nabieh =

Egyptian football manager (born 1975)

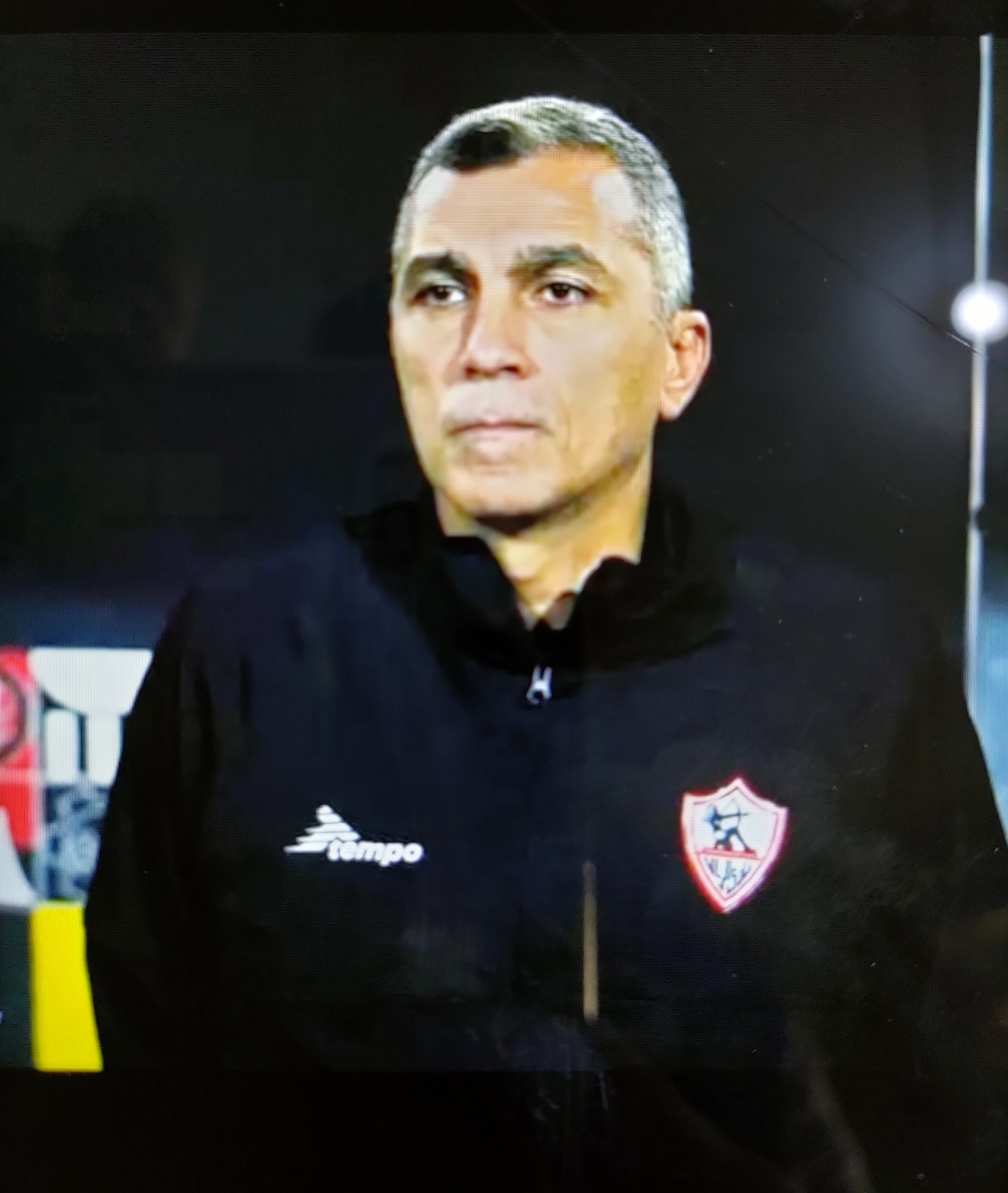
- Nabieh in 2023

Personal information
- Full name: Osama Nabieh Mahmoud El-Ghamrawy
- Date of birth: 20 January 1975 (age 51)
- Place of birth: Giza, Egypt
- Height: 6 ft 1 in (1.85 m)
- Position: Striker

Youth career
- Zamalek

Senior career*
Years	Team	Apps	(Gls)
1996–1997	Tersana		
1997–1999	Zamalek	59	(23)
2000–2001	Altay S.K.	3	(0)
2001–2002	Al Kuwait		
2002–2003	Zamalek	9	(2)
2003–2005	Baladeyet Al-Mahalla		
2007–2011	Itesalat		

International career
1995–1999	Egypt	17	(1)

Managerial career
- 2011–2013: Zamalek (assistant)
- 2013–2018: Egypt (assistant)
- 2019: Masr
- 2020: Al-Shoulla
- 2020–2021: Masr
- 2021–2023: Zamalek (assistant)
- 2022: Zamalek (caretaker)
- 2023: Zamalek (caretaker)
- 2023: Al-Merrikh
- 2024: Egypt U18
- 2025: Egypt U20
- * Club domestic league appearances and goals

Osama Nabieh (Arabic: أسامة نبيه; born 20 January 1975) is a former Egyptian professional footballer. He last served as the head coach of the Egypt under-20 national team.

Nabieh has played for several clubs in Egypt, including Zamalek, Tersana and Baladeyet Al-Mahalla, and also spent time with Altay S.K. in Turkey and Al Kuwait. Nabih played for the Egypt national football team at the 1998 African Cup of Nations.

As a manager, he coached Masr, Al-Shoulla, Zamalek as caretaker, and Al-Merrikh. He later coached Egyptian national youth teams, including Egypt U18 and Egypt U20.

== Honours ==
Player

Club

Zamalek

- Egyptian Premier League: 2000–01, 2002–03
- Egypt Cup: 1998–99
- Egyptian Super Cup: 2001–02
- CAF Champions League: 1996
- African Cup Winners' Cup: 2000
- CAF Super Cup: 1997
- Afro-Asian Cup: 1997

International

Egypt

- African Cup of Nations: 1998
- All Africa Games Gold Medal: 1995
