= 1986 African Cup of Champions Clubs final =

1986 African Champions Cup final
- Event: 1986 African Cup of Champions Clubs
Zamalek	Africa Sports
(Egypt)	(Ivory Coast)
2	2
- Zamalek won 4–2 on penalties

First leg
Zamalek	Africa Sports
2	0
- Date: 28 November 1986
- Venue: Cairo Stadium, Cairo

Second leg
Africa Sports	Zamalek
2	0
- Date: 21 December 1986
- Venue: Stade Félix Houphouët-Boigny, Abidjan

The 1986 African Cup of Champions Clubs final was a football tie held over two legs in December 1986 between Zamalek, and Africa Sports.

Zamalek from Egypt won that final 4 – 2 in the penalty shoot-out, with the aggregate ending 2 – 2.

== Match details ==
=== First leg ===
28 November 1986
--:-- UTC+2

Zamalek (Egypt)	2–0	(Ivory Coast) Africa Sports
Younes 45', 48'

Cairo International Stadium, Cairo

=== Second leg ===
21 December 1986
--:-- UTC+0

Africa Sports (Ivory Coast)	2–0	(Egypt) Zamalek
Guédé Gba ?'; Lué 58' (pen.)
Penalties
Penalty scored Penalty missed	2–4	(penalty missed) Tolba; (penalty scored) Abdel-Hamid; (penalty scored) Helmy; (penalty scored) Abdel-Latif; (penalty scored) Kasem

Stade Félix Houphouët-Boigny, Abidjan

== Notes and references ==
- https://www.angelfire.com/ak/EgyptianSports/ZamalekAfr1986.html
- https://web.archive.org/web/20160305043429/http://www.rsssf.com/tablesa/afcup86.html
