= Ajibade Babalade =

Nigerian footballer (1972–2020)

Personal information
- Full name: Ajibade Kunde Babalade
- Date of birth: 29 March 1972
- Place of birth: Nigeria
- Date of death: 4 September 2020 (aged 48)
- Place of death: Ibadan, Nigeria
- Position: Defender

Senior career*
Years	Team	Apps	(Gls)
1990	Stationery Stores		
1991	Iwuanyanwu Nationale		
1992–1993	Shooting Stars FC		
1994	Africa Sports		
1995–1997	Shooting Stars FC		
1997–1998	Anyang LG Cheetahs	2	(0)
1998–2000	SK Sturm Graz	10	(0)
2004	Shooting Stars FC		
2004–2005	Mohun Bagan AC		

International career^{‡}
1990–1998	Nigeria	13	(0)

Managerial career
- 2008–2020: Shooting Stars FC
- * Club domestic league appearances and goals as of 6 September 2020 ‡ National team caps and goals as of 6 September 2020

Ajibade Kunde Babalade (29 March 1972 – 4 September 2020) was a Nigerian footballer who played as a defender and was Team Chef of Shooting Stars FC.

Babalade died on 4 September 2020, aged 48.

== Club career ==
He played for FC Seoul of the South Korean K-League, then known as Anyang LG Cheetahs.

== Coaching career ==
On 17 October 2008 he was named as manager of the Shooting Stars F.C.
