= Ahmed El-Kass =

Egyptian football manager (born 1965)

- El-Kass in 2017

Personal information
- Full name: Ahmed Abdou Abd El-Aziz El-Kass
- Date of birth: 8 July 1965 (age 61)
- Place of birth: Alexandria, Egypt
- Position: Forward

Team information
- Current team: Egypt U-17 (Manager)

Senior career*
Years	Team	Apps	(Gls)
1983–1995	Olympic Club	164	(78)
1995–1997	Zamalek	67	(33)
1997–2000	Ittihad Alexandria	3	(4)
2000–2002	Olympic Club		
Total		234	(115)

International career
1987–1997	Egypt	112	(25)

Managerial career
- 2007–2008: Olympic Club
- 2008–2009: Talaea El Geish (assistant)
- 2009: Olympic Club
- 2010–2015: Abou Qir Fertilizers
- 2015–2016: Damietta
- 2016: El Qanah
- 2016–2017: FC Masr
- 2017–2019: Abou Qir Fertilizers
- 2019–2023: Olympic Club
- 2023-: Egypt U-17
- * Club domestic league appearances and goals

Ahmed Abdou Abd El-Aziz El-Kass (Arabic: أحمد عبده عبد العزيز الكاس; born 8 July 1965), is an Egyptian football manager and former football player.

== Career ==
El-Kass played for Olympic, Zamalek and Ittihad Alexandria in the Egyptian Premier League. He is the league's fifth all-time highest scorer with 107 goals.

== Clubs ==
- Olympic (Alexandria) (1983–95) (78 gls)
- Zamalek (1995–97) (33 gls)
- Ittihad Allexandria (1998-2000) (4 gls)

== National team ==
- Played for Egyptian National Team (1987–1997) / Captain in 1996
- Played in World Cup 1990 in Italy
- 3 goals in African Cup Of Nations (South Africa 1996)

== Career statistics ==
=== International ===
Scores and results list Egypt's goal tally first, score column indicates score after each El-Kass goal.

List of international goals scored by Ahmed El-Kass
No.	Date	Venue	Opponent	Score	Result	Competition	Ref.
1	4 April 1987	Uhuru Stadium, Dar es Salaam, Tanzania	Tanzania	3–0	4–2	1987 All-Africa Games qualification	
2	11 January 1989	Ghazl El Mahalla Stadium, El Mahalla, Egypt	Finland	2–1	2–1	Friendly	
3	21 April 1989	Cairo International Stadium, Cairo, Egypt	Ethiopia	3–0	6–1	1990 African Cup of Nations qualification	
4	7 November 1989	El Menzah Stadium, Tunis, Tunisia	Tunisia	1–0	4–0	Friendly	
5	28 March 1990	Cairo International Stadium, Cairo, Egypt	Romania	1–2	1–3	Friendly	
6	4 April 1990	Stadion Za Lužánkami, Brno, Czechoslovakia	Czechoslovakia	1–0	1–0	Friendly	
7	3 December 1991	Cairo International Stadium, Cairo, Egypt	Poland	1–0	4–0	Friendly	
8	4 January 1992	Mokhtar El Tetsh Stadium, Cairo, Egypt	Czechoslovakia	1–0	2–0	Friendly	
9	19 July 1992	Japoma Stadium, Douala, Cameroon	Cameroon	1–0	1–0	Friendly	
10	20 December 1992	National Sports Stadium, Harare, Zimbabwe	Zimbabwe	1–2	1–2	1994 FIFA World Cup qualification	
11	31 January 1993	Cairo Military Academy Stadium, Cairo, Egypt	Togo	3–0	3–0	1994 FIFA World Cup qualification	
12	25 July 1993	Stade Modibo Kéïta, Bamako, Mali	Mali	1–1	1–2	1994 African Cup of Nations qualification	
13	14 October 1994	Cairo International Stadium, Cairo, Egypt	Tanzania	1–0	5–1	1996 African Cup of Nations qualification	
14	14 October 1994	Cairo International Stadium, Cairo, Egypt	Tanzania	2–0	5–1	1996 African Cup of Nations qualification	
15	26 March 1995	Camille Chamoun Sports City Stadium, Beirut, Lebanon	Lebanon	–	1–1	Friendly	
16	7 April 1995	Alexandria Stadium, Alexandria, Egypt	Sudan	3–1	3–1	1996 African Cup of Nations qualification	
17	4 June 1995	Addis Ababa Stadium, Addis Ababa, Ethiopia	Ethiopia	1–0	2–0	1996 African Cup of Nations qualification	
18	4 July 1995		Syria	–	1–1	Friendly	
19	30 July 1995	Alexandria Stadium, Alexandria, Egypt	Uganda	1–0	6–0	1996 African Cup of Nations qualification	
20	30 July 1995	Alexandria Stadium, Alexandria, Egypt	Uganda	5–0	6–0	1996 African Cup of Nations qualification	
21	30 July 1995	Alexandria Stadium, Alexandria, Egypt	Uganda	6–0	6–0	1996 African Cup of Nations qualification	
22	26 November 1995	FNB Stadium, Johannesburg, South Africa	Zambia	1–0	3–1	Friendly	
23	29 December 1995	Cairo International Stadium, Cairo, Egypt	Ghana	1–0	1–2	Friendly	
24	15 January 1996	FNB Stadium, Johannesburg, South Africa	Angola	1–0	2–1	1996 Africa Cup of Nations	
25	15 January 1996	FNB Stadium, Johannesburg, South Africa	Angola	2–0	2–1	1996 Africa Cup of Nations	
26	24 January 1996	FNB Stadium, Johannesburg, South Africa	South Africa	1–0	1–0	1996 Africa Cup of Nations	

== Honours ==
=== Player ===
Zamalek

- African Cup of Champions Clubs: 1996
- CAF Super Cup: 1997

Egypt

- Arab Cup: 1992
- World Military Cup: 1993

=== Manager ===
Egypt U-17

- UNAF U-17 Tournament: 2024 (Algeria), 2024 (Morocco)

=== Individual ===
- Egyptian Premier League top scorer: 1991–92, 1992–93, 1993–94
- Egyptian Premier League 7th all-time goal scorer with 107 Goals
- Scored 5 goals for Zamalek in African Club Cups
- Al-Ahram Hebdo Award: Player of the Year in Egypt 1994

== See also ==
- List of men's footballers with 100 or more international caps
