= Goldi SC =

Egyptian football club

- Full name: Goldi Sporting club
- Founded: 1994; 31 years ago
- Chairman: (Egypt) Hani Said
- Manager: Fayza Rahim
- League: Egyptian Third Division
Home colours	Away colours

Goldi Sporting Club (Arabic: نادي جولدي الرياضي) is an Egyptian football club based in Cairo. It was founded in 1994 under the name El-Maaden (Arabic: المعادن ; lit. 'Metals'), and was renamed in 2001.

== Achievements ==
- Egyptian League Cup
  - Third place (1): 2000

== Managers ==
- (Egypt) Mohamed Salah (1999–2001)
- (Egypt) Anwar Salama (2002)
- (Egypt) Mohamed Aboel Azz (2002)
- (Egypt) Mohamed Salah (2002–2003)
- (Egypt) Ibrahim Said (2016)
- (Egypt) Fayza Rahim (2021-)
