= 1996 African Cup of Champions Clubs =

Tournament details
- Dates: 1996
- Teams: 42 (from 41 associations)

Final positions
- Champions: (Egypt) Zamalek (4th title)
- Runners-up: (Nigeria) Shooting Stars

Tournament statistics
- Matches played: 71
- Goals scored: 164 (2.31 per match)

The 1996 African Cup of Champions Clubs was the 32nd edition of the annual international club football competition held in the CAF region (Africa), the African Cup of Champions Clubs. It determined that year's club champion of association football in Africa.

Zamalek from Egypt won that final, and became for the fourth time CAF club champion.

== Preliminary round ==
Team 1	Agg.	Team 2	1st leg	2nd leg
Toffa Cotonou (Benin)	0–3	(Liberia) Mighty Barolle	0–0	0–3^{1}
Saint-George SA (Ethiopia)	2–2 (a)	(Seychelles) Sunshine FC	1–0	1–2
Boavista (Cape Verde)	dq^{2}	(Mauritania) ASC Sonalec	—	—
FACA (Central African Republic)	0–7	(Burundi) Fantastique FC	0–4	0–3^{3}
Postel 2000 FC (Chad)	3–1	(Republic of the Congo) AS Chéminots	2–0	1–1
Fobar (Madagascar)	1–2	(Eswatini) Mbabane Highlanders	0–0	1–2
CS Saint-Denis (Réunion)	10–1	(Lesotho) Majantja	7–0	3–1
Express FC (Uganda)	2–3	(Mauritius) Sunrise Flacq United	1–0	1–3
Young Africans (Tanzania)	1–3	(Rwanda) APR FC	1–0	0–3
Township Rollers (Botswana)	2–5	(Namibia) Black Africa FC	2–1	0–4

^{1} Toffa Cotonou withdrew after the first leg.
^{2} ASC Sonalec were disqualified for late payment of the entry fee.
^{3} FACA withdrew after the first leg.

== First round ==
Team 1	Agg.	Team 2	1st leg	2nd leg
COD Meknès (Morocco)	2–2 (a)	(Togo) Semassi FC	1–0	1–2
ASFA Yennenga (Burkina Faso)	2–5	(Ghana) Ashanti Gold SC	1–4	1–1
JS Kabylie (Algeria)	4–1	(Cape Verde) Boavista	2–0	2–1
ASEC Mimosas (Ivory Coast)	5–0	(Chad) Postel 2000 FC	4–0	1–0
ASC Diaraf (Senegal)	1–1 (a)	(Guinea) Kaloum Star	0–0	1–1
Shooting Stars (Nigeria)	5–2	(Gabon) AS Mangasport	4–0	1–2
Dynamos FC (Zimbabwe)	2–0	(Kenya) Gor Mahia	1–0	1–0
Mufulira Wanderers (Zambia)	4–0	(Eswatini) Mbabane Highlanders	3–0	1–0
Orlando Pirates (South Africa)	4–3	(Réunion) CS Saint-Denis	2–0	2–3
Zamalek (Egypt)	4–3	(Mauritius) Sunrise Flacq United	3–1	1–2
AS Bantous (Zaire)	1–2	(Rwanda) APR FC	1–0	0–2
Petro Atlético (Angola)	3–1	(Namibia) Black Africa FC	2–0	1–1
Al-Hilal Club (Sudan)	0–1	(Ethiopia) Saint George SC	0–0	0–1
CS Sfaxien (Tunisia)	w/o	(Liberia) Mighty Barolle	—	—
Desportivo Maputo (Mozambique)	w/o	(South Africa) Cape Town Spurs	—	—
RC Bafoussam (Cameroon)	1-1^{1}	(Burundi) Fantastique FC	1–1	—

^{1} RC Bafoussam withdrew after 1st leg, and Fantastique FC advanced to Second Round.

== Second round ==
Team 1	Agg.	Team 2	1st leg	2nd leg
CS Sfaxien (Tunisia)	3–1	(Ethiopia) Saint George SC	3–0	0–1
COD Meknès (Morocco)	1–0	(Ghana) Ashanti Gold SC	1–0	0–0
JS Kabylie (Algeria)	1–0	(Burundi) Fantastique FC	0–0	1–0
ASEC Mimosas (Ivory Coast)	1–1 (a)	(Senegal) ASC Diaraf	1–1	0–0
Shooting Stars (Nigeria)	6–4	(Zimbabwe) Dynamos FC	5–1	1–3
Mufulira Wanderers (Zambia)	1–2	(South Africa) Orlando Pirates	1–1	0–1
Zamalek (Egypt)	w/o	(Mozambique) Desportivo Maputo	—	—
APR FC (Rwanda)	2–3	(Angola) Petro Atlético	2–0	0–3

== Quarterfinal ==
Team 1	Agg.	Team 2	1st leg	2nd leg
Orlando Pirates (South Africa)	1–1 (3–4 p)	(Nigeria) Shooting Stars	1–0	0–1
Zamalek (Egypt)	4–2	(Morocco) COD Meknès	2–0	2–2
CS Sfaxien (Tunisia)	6–3	(Senegal) ASC Diaraf	5–0	1–3
Petro Atlético (Angola)	1–2	(Algeria) JS Kabylie	1–1	0–1

== Semifinal ==
Team 1	Agg.	Team 2	1st leg	2nd leg
JS Kabylie (Algeria)	1–2	(Nigeria) Shooting Stars	1–1	0–1
CS Sfaxien (Tunisia)	1–1 (3–4 p)	(Egypt) Zamalek	1–0	0–1

== Final ==
30 November 1996
--:-- UTC+0

Shooting Stars (Nigeria)	2–1	(Egypt) Zamalek
Onya 34'; Babalade 63'		Mostafa 89'

Lekan Salami Stadium, Ibadan
Attendance: 30,000
Referee: Ian McLeod (South Africa)
13 December 1996
--:-- UTC+2

Zamalek (Egypt)	2–1	(Nigeria) Shooting Stars
Abdel-Hady 29'; Mansour 66'		Ademola 89'
Penalties
Gamal (penalty scored); Mansour (penalty scored); El-Sheshini (penalty missed); El-Kass (penalty scored); Kasem (penalty scored); Nabih (penalty scored)	5–4	(penalty missed) Mancha; (penalty scored) ?; (penalty scored) Babalade; (penalty scored) ?; (penalty scored) Baruwa; (penalty missed) Ademola

Cairo International Stadium, Cairo
Attendance: 75,000
Referee: Sidi Békaye Magassa (Mali)

== Winners ==
1996 African Cup of Champions Clubs Winners
(Egypt)
Zamalek
Fourth title

== Top scorers ==
The top scorers from the 1996 African Cup of Champions Clubs are as follows:

Rank	Name	Team	Goals
1	(Egypt) Ahmed El-Kass	(Egypt) Zamalek	2
1	(Egypt) Ayman Mansour	(Egypt) Zamalek	2
1	(Egypt) Tarek Mostafa	(Egypt) Zamalek	2
1	(Egypt) Mohamed Sabry	(Egypt) Zamalek	2
1	(Rwanda) Julien Ndagano	(Rwanda) APR FC	2
1	(Tunisia) Skander Souayah	(Tunisia) CS Sfaxien	2
