= Football at the 1992 Summer Olympics – Men's team squads =

== Australia ==
Head coach: (Scotland) Eddie Thomson

No.	Pos.	Player	DoB	Age	Caps	Club	Tournament games	Tournament goals	Minutes played	Sub off	Sub on	Cards yellow/red
1	GK	John Filan	8 February 1970	22	?	(Australia) St George Saints
2	DF	Milan Blagojevic	24 December 1969	22	?	(Australia) Marconi Stallions
3	DF	Dominic Longo	23 August 1970	21	?	(Australia) Newcastle Breakers
4	DF	Ned Zelic	4 July 1971	21	?	(Australia) Sydney Olympic
5	DF	Shaun Murphy	5 November 1970	21	?	(Australia) Heidelberg
6	DF	Tony Vidmar	4 July 1970	22	?	(Australia) Adelaide City
7	MF	John Gibson	10 February 1970	22	?	(Australia) APIA Leichardt Tigers
8	MF	Paul Okon	5 April 1972	20	?	(Belgium) Club Brugge
9	FW	Zlatko Arambasic	20 September 1969	22	?	(Belgium) Mechelen
10	MF	George Slifkas	18 October 1969	22	?	(Australia) Heidelberg
11	FW	John Markovski	15 April 1970	22	?	(Australia) Marconi Stallions
12	MF	Damian Mori	30 September 1970	21	?	(Australia) Melbourne Croatia
13	FW	Carl Veart	21 May 1970	22	?	(Australia) Adelaide City
14	FW	Steve Refenes	19 February 1970	22	?	(Australia) Sydney Olympic
15	DF	Tony Popovic	4 July 1973	19	?	(Australia) Sydney Croatia
16	FW	David Seal	26 January 1972	20	?	(Australia) Marconi Stallions
17	FW	Gary Hasler	5 July 1970	22	?	(Australia) Sunshine George Cross
18	MF	Steve Corica	24 March 1973	19	?	(Australia) Marconi Stallions
19	MF	Brad Maloney	19 January 1972	20	?	(Australia) Newcastle Breakers
20	GK	Mark Bosnich	13 January 1972	20	?	(Australia) Sydney Croatia

== Colombia ==
Head coach: Hernán Darío Gómez

No.	Pos.	Player	DoB	Age	Caps	Club	Tournament games	Tournament goals	Minutes played	Sub off	Sub on	Cards yellow/red
1	GK	Miguel Calero	14 April 1971	21	?	(Colombia) Deportivo Cali
2	DF	Jorge Bermúdez	18 June 1971	21	?	(Colombia) América de Cali
3	DF	Robeiro Moreno	11 November 1969	22	?	(Colombia) Once Caldas
4	DF	José Santa	12 November 1970	21	?	(Colombia) Atlético Nacional
5	DF	Victor Marulanda	3 February 1971	21	?	(Colombia) Atlético Nacional
6	MF	Hernán Gaviria	27 November 1969	22	?	(Colombia) Atlético Nacional
7	FW	Faustino Asprilla	10 November 1969	22	?	(Italy) Parma
8	MF	Harold Lozano	30 March 1972	20	?	(Colombia) América de Cali
9	FW	Iván Valenciano	18 March 1972	20	?	(Italy) Atalanta
10	MF	Víctor Pacheco	24 September 1974	17	?	(Colombia) Atlético Junior
11	FW	Carlos Uribe	26 September 1969	22	?	(Colombia) Independiente Medellín
12	GK	Faryd Mondragón	21 June 1971	21	?	(Colombia) Real Cartagena
13	DF	Geovanis Cassiani	10 January 1970	22	?	(Colombia) Atlético Nacional
14	MF	John Wilmar Pérez	21 February 1970	22	?	(Colombia) Independiente Medellín
15	FW	Víctor Aristizábal	9 December 1971	20	?	(Colombia) Atlético Nacional
16	FW	Gustavo Restrepo	24 September 1969	22	?	(Colombia) Atlético Nacional
17	MF	John Jairo Mejía	12 March 1970	22	?	(Colombia) Envigado
18	MF	Diego Osorio	21 July 1970	22	?	(Colombia) Atlético Nacional
19	FW	Jairo Zulbarán	7 January 1970	22	?	(Colombia) Independiente Medellín
20	MF	Omar Cañas	16 September 1969	22	?	(Colombia) Atlético Nacional

== Denmark ==
Head coach: Viggo Jensen

No.	Pos.	Player	DoB	Age	Caps	Club	Tournament games	Tournament goals	Minutes played	Sub off	Sub on	Cards yellow/red
1	GK	Niels Jørgensen	24 January 1971	21	16	(Denmark) AaB	3	0	270	-	-	-
2	DF	Thomas Helveg	24 June 1971	21	0	(Denmark) Odense BK	3	0	270	-	-	1/0
3	DF	Jacob Laursen	6 October 1971	20	10	(Denmark) VB	3	0	270	-	-	-
4	DF	Claus Thomsen	31 May 1970	22	15	(Denmark) AGF Aarhus	3	1	240	1	-	-
5	DF	Peter Frank	26 May 1970	22	14	(Denmark) BK Frem	2	0	158	-	1	-
6	MF	Jakob Kjeldbjerg	21 October 1969	22	17	(Denmark) Silkeborg	3	0	270	-	-	1/0
7	MF	Jens Christian Madsen	1 February 1970	22	18	(Denmark) Brøndby	1	0	30	-	1	-
8	MF	Ronnie Ekelund	21 August 1972	19	8	(Denmark) Brøndby	2	0	118	2	-	-
9	FW	Miklos Molnar	10 April 1970	22	18	(Switzerland) Servette	3	0	243	-	-	1/1
10	MF	Per Frandsen	6 February 1970	22	18	(France) Lille	3	0	270	-	-	1/0
11	FW	Peter Møller	23 March 1972	20	13	(Denmark) AaB	3	0	162	2	1	-
12	DF	Jens Risager	9 April 1971	21	2	(Denmark) Brøndby	-	-	-	-	-	-
13	MF	Stig Tøfting	14 August 1969	22	2	(Denmark) AGF Aarhus	3	0	270	-	-	1/0
14	MF	Lars Højer	8 December 1970	21	5	(Denmark) Copenhagen	3	0	214	-	1	-
15	MF	Michael Hansen	22 September 1971	20	13	(Denmark) Silkeborg	-	-	-	-	-	-
16	GK	Brian Flies	29 August 1969	22	0	(Denmark) Næstved BK	-	-	-	-	-	-
17	FW	Jens Christian Mosegaard Madsen	20 April 1970	21	11	(Denmark) Odense BK	1	0	19	-	1	-
18	MF	Michael Larsen	16 October 1969	22	5	(Denmark) Silkeborg	2	0	112	1	-	-
19	FW	Søren Andersen	31 January 1970	22	6	(Denmark) AGF Aarhus	1	0	27	-	1	-
20	MF	Michael Johansen	22 July 1972	20	3	(Denmark) Copenhagen	-	-	-	-	-	-

== Egypt ==
Head coach: Mahmoud Saad El-Din Ahmed

No.	Pos.	Player	DoB	Age	Caps	Club	Tournament games	Tournament goals	Minutes played	Sub off	Sub on	Cards yellow/red
1	GK	Nader El-Sayed	31 December 1972			(Egypt) Zamalek SC
2	DF	Amr El-Hadidy	24 December 1969			(Egypt) Ghazl El Mahalla SC
3	DF	Tamer Abdul Hamid	16 October 1971			(Egypt) Zamalek SC
4	DF	Khaled El-Ghandour	27 July 1970			(Egypt) Zamalek SC
5	DF	Haytham Farouk	4 January 1971			(Egypt) Olympic SC
6	DF	Sami El-Sheshini	23 January 1972			(Egypt) Zamalek SC
7	DF	Yehia Nabil Khaled	4 September 1971			(Egypt) Zamalek SC
8	MF	Hady Khashaba	19 December 1972			(Egypt) Al Ahly SC
9	FW	Moustafa Ibrahim	1 August 1970			(Egypt) Zamalek SC
10	FW	Mohamed Salah Abo Greisha	1 January 1970			(Egypt) Ismaily SC
11	FW	Yasser Rayyan	26 March 1970			(Egypt) El Mansoura SC
12	GK	Essam Abdelazim	1 November 1970			(Egypt) Tersana SC
13	MF	Mohamed Youssef	9 October 1970			(Egypt) Al Ahly SC
14	FW	Moustafa Sadek	31 January 1972			(Egypt) Al Mokawloon Al Arab SC
15	MF	Akel Gadallah	15 November 1972			(Egypt) Zamalek SC
16	DF	Tawfik Sakr	8 November 1969			(Egypt) Ghazl El Mahalla SC
17	DF	Ahmed Nakhla	5 February 1971			(Egypt) Al Mokawloon Al Arab SC
18	FW	Mohamed Abdelaty	14 January 1971			(Egypt) Olympic El Qanah FC
19	GK	Mohamed Sallam	5 December 1969			(Egypt) Olympic SC
20	FW	Ibrahim El-Masry	19 August 1971			(Egypt) Al-Masry SC

== Ghana ==
Head coach: Sam Arday

No.	Pos.	Player	DoB	Age	Caps	Club	Tournament games	Tournament goals	Minutes played	Sub off	Sub on	Cards yellow/red
1	GK	Anthony Mensah	31 October 1972	19	?	(Ghana) Asante Kotoko
2	DF	Frank Amankwah	29 December 1971	20	?	(Ghana) Asante Kotoko
3	DF	Isaac Asare	1 September 1974	17	?	(Belgium) Anderlecht
4	DF	Mohammed Gargo	19 June 1975	17	?	(Italy) Torino
5	DF	Joachim Yaw Acheampong	2 November 1973	18	?	(Ghana) Goldfields
6	MF	Alex Nyarko	15 October 1973	18	?	(Ghana) Dawu Youngstars
7	MF	Oli Rahman	7 July 1975	17	?	(Ghana) Asante Kotoko
8	MF	Nii Lamptey	10 December 1974	17	?	(Belgium) Anderlecht
9	FW	Kwame Ayew	28 December 1973	18	?	(France) Metz
10	MF	Shamo Quaye	22 October 1971	20	?	(Ghana) Hearts of Oak
11	MF	Samuel Kumah	26 June 1970	22	?	(Ghana) Hearts of Oak
12	DF	Samuel Kuffour	3 September 1976	15	?	(Italy) Torino
13	DF	Sammi Adjei	18 November 1973	18	?	(Ghana) Goldfields
14	DF	Mohammed Dramani Kalilu	21 October 1972	19	?	(Ghana) Hearts of Oak
15	MF	Bernard Aryee	23 April 1973	19	?	(Ghana) Hearts of Oak
16	GK	Simon Addo	11 December 1974	17	?	(Ghana) Goldfields
17	FW	Maxwell Konadu	4 December 1972	19	?	(Ghana) Asante Kotoko
18	FW	Yaw Preko	8 December 1974	17	?	(Belgium) Anderlecht
19	FW	Mamood Amadu	17 November 1972	19	?	(Ghana) Asante Kotoko
20	GK	Ibrahim Dossey	24 November 1972	19	?	(Ghana) Dawu Youngstars

== Italy ==
Head coach: Cesare Maldini

No.	Pos.	Player	DoB	Age	Caps	Club	Tournament games	Tournament goals	Minutes played	Sub off	Sub on	Cards yellow/red
1	GK	Francesco Antonioli	14 September 1969	22	?	(Italy) Milan	4	-	360	-	-	-
2	DF	Mauro Bonomi	23 August 1972	19	?	(Italy) Cremonese	3	-	270	-	-	-
3	DF	Giuseppe Favalli	8 January 1972	20	?	(Italy) Cremonese	4	-	307	2	-	2/0
4	DF	Luca Luzardi	18 February 1970	22	?	(Italy) Brescia	2	-	149	-	-	1/1
5	DF	Salvatore Matrecano	5 October 1970	21	?	(Italy) Foggia	3	-	270	-	-	-
6	DF	Alessandro Orlando	1 June 1970	22	?	(Italy) Sampdoria	-	-	-	-	-	-
7	DF	Stefano Rossini	2 February 1971	21	?	(Italy) Udinese	4	-	91	-	4	-
8	DF	Mirko Taccola	4 August 1970	21	?	(Italy) Pisa	-	-	-	-	-	-
9	DF	Rufo Verga	21 December 1969	22	?	(Italy) Lazio	4	-	360	-	-	-
10	MF	Demetrio Albertini	23 August 1971	20	?	(Italy) Milan	3	1	260	1	-	3/0
11	MF	Dino Baggio	24 July 1971	21	?	(Italy) Internazionale	3	-	270	-	-	1/0
12	GK	Angelo Peruzzi	16 February 1970	22	?	(Italy) Juventus	-	-	-	-	-	-
13	MF	Eugenio Corini	30 July 1970	22	?	(Italy) Juventus	2	-	156	-	-	0/1
14	MF	Dario Marcolin	28 October 1971	20	?	(Italy) Cremonese	4	-	360	-	-	1/0
15	MF	Gianluca Sordo	2 December 1969	22	?	(Italy) Torino	3	-	123	2	1	2/0
16	FW	Renato Buso	19 December 1969	22	?	(Italy) Sampdoria	4	-	359	-	-	1/1
17	FW	Pasquale Rocco	11 October 1970	21	?	(Italy) Pisa	2	-	152	2	-	-
18	FW	Marco Ferrante	4 February 1971	21	?	(Italy) Pisa	-	-	-	-	-
19	FW	Alessandro Melli	11 December 1969	22	?	(Italy) Parma	4	2	344	1	-	1/0
20	FW	Roberto Muzzi	21 September 1971	20	?	(Italy) Roma	3	-	80	-	3	1/0

== South Korea ==
Head coach: (South Korea) Kim Sam-rak

No.	Pos.	Player	DoB	Age	Caps	Club	Tournament games	Tournament goals	Minutes played	Sub off	Sub on	Cards yellow/red
1	GK	Kim Bong-soo	4 December 1970	21	?	(South Korea) LG Cheetahs
2	DF	Na Seung-hwa	8 October 1969	22	?	(South Korea) POSCO Atoms
3	DF	Lee Moon-seok	6 March 1970	22	?	(South Korea) University of Incheon
4	MF	Han Jung-kook	19 July 1971	21	?	(South Korea) Hanyang University
5	DF	Kang Chul	2 November 1971	20	?	(South Korea) Yonsei University
6	MF	Shin Tae-yong	11 May 1970	21	?	(South Korea) Ilhwa Chunma
7	DF	Kim Gwi-hwa	15 March 1970	22	?	(South Korea) Daewoo Royals
8	MF	Noh Jung-yoon	28 March 1971	21	?	(South Korea) Korea University
9	FW	Gwak Kyung-keun	10 October 1972	19	?	(South Korea) Korea University
10	FW	Jung Jae-kwon	5 November 1970	21	?	(South Korea) Hanyang University
11	FW	Seo Jung-won	17 December 1970	21	?	(South Korea) LG Cheetahs
12	FW	Cho Jung-hyun	12 November 1969	22	?	(South Korea) Yukong Elephants
13	MF	Kim Do-keun	2 March 1972	20	?	(South Korea) Hanyang University
14	DF	Jung Kwang-seok	1 December 1970	21	?	(South Korea) Sungkyunkwan University
15	DF	Lee Seung-hyeop	15 April 1971	21	?	(South Korea) Yonsei University
16	MF	Cho Jin-ho	2 August 1973	18	?	(South Korea) Hanyang University
17	DF	Lee Lim-saeng	18 November 1971	21	?	(South Korea) Korea University
18	MF	Lee Jin-haeng	10 July 1971	21	?	(South Korea) Yonsei University
19	GK	Shin Bum-chul	27 September 1970	21	?	(South Korea) Ajou University
20	GK	Lee Woon-jae	26 April 1973	19	?	(South Korea) Kyung Hee University

== Kuwait ==
Head coach: (Brazil) Valmir Louruz

No.	Pos.	Player	DoB	Age	Caps	Club	Tournament games	Tournament goals	Minutes played	Sub off	Sub on	Cards yellow/red
1	GK	Falah Al Majidi	13 November 1970	21	?	(Kuwait) Al Jahra SC
2	DF	Osama Hussain	11 August 1970	21	?	(Kuwait) Al-Arabi SC
3	DF	Ahmad Hajji	11 February 1972	20	?	(Kuwait) Qadsia SC
4	DF	Meshal Al-Anzi	26 January 1972	20	?	(Kuwait) Al-Shabab SC
5	DF	Mohamed Al-Kaledi	13 February 1971	21	?	(Kuwait) Qadsia SC
6	DF	Nawaf Al-Dhafari	16 July 1971	21	?	(Kuwait) Al Jahra SC
7	FW	Fahad Marzouq	2 January 1971	21	?	(Kuwait) Al Tadamun SC
8	MF	Hussain Al-Khodari	7 February 1972	20	?	(Kuwait) Al-Salmiya SC
9	FW	Ali Marwi	14 October 1969	22	?	(Kuwait) Al-Salmiya SC
10	MF	Mansour Mohamed	3 September 1970	21	?	(Kuwait) Al-Arabi SC
11	MF	Abdullah Wabran	2 July 1971	21	?	(Kuwait) Al Tadamun SC
12	MF	Fawaz Al-Ahmad	9 November 1969	22	?	(Kuwait) Kazma SC
13	DF	Yousif Al Dakhi	2 August 1973	18	?	(Kuwait) Kazma SC
14	MF	Mohamed Ben Haji	28 December 1970	21	?	(Kuwait) Qadsia SC
15	DF	Hamad Al-Easa	9 January 1972	20	?	(Kuwait) Al Tadamun SC
16	DF	Sami Al Lanqawi	1 July 1972	20	?	(Kuwait) Al-Arabi SC
17	FW	Thamer Enad	23 May 1970	22	?	(Kuwait) Al Salibikhaet SC
18	DF	Salammah Al-Enazy	13 August 1972	19	?	(Kuwait) Al Jahra SC
19	GK	Khaled Al Fadhli	15 May 1974	18	?	(Kuwait) Kazma SC
20	FW	Jasem Al-Huwaidi	28 October 1972	19	?	(Kuwait) Al-Salmiya SC

== Mexico ==
Head coach: (Argentina) Óscar Iparraguirre

No.	Pos.	Player	DoB	Age	Caps	Club	Tournament games	Tournament goals	Minutes played	Sub off	Sub on	Cards yellow/red
1	GK	José Alberto Guadarrama	8 May 1972		?	(Mexico) Cruz Azul
2	MF	Ricardo Cadena	23 October 1969		?	(Mexico) Guadalajara
3	DF	Manuel Vidrio	23 August 1972		?	(Mexico) Guadalajara
4	MF	Alberto Macías	28 December 1969		?	(Mexico) Toluca
5	DF	Silviano Delgado	4 September 1969		?	(Mexico) Puebla
6	MF	Joaquín Hernández	1 February 1971		?	(Mexico) América
7	MF	José Agustín Morales	13 January 1971		?	(Mexico) Cruz Azul
8	FW	David Rangel	12 November 1969		?	(Mexico) Cruz Azul
9	FW	Francisco Rotllán	6 January 1970		?	(Mexico) Puebla
10	MF	Jorge Castañeda	12 January 1970		?	(Mexico) Atlas
11	DF	Damián Álvarez	11 March 1973		?	(Mexico) Atlas
12	GK	Miguel Fuentes	29 September 1971		?	(Mexico) Atlas
13	MF	Camilo Romero	30 March 1970		?	(Mexico) Guadalajara
14	DF	Carlos López	18 April 1970		?	(Mexico) Necaxa
15	DF	José Eduardo Pavez	13 October 1969		?	(Mexico) Atlante
16	FW	Mario Arteaga	29 November 1970		?	(Mexico) Guadalajara
17	FW	Pedro Pineda	30 November 1971		?	(Mexico) Guadalajara
18	MF	Ángel Lemus	3 September 1971		?	(Mexico) Necaxa
19	MF	Ignacio Vázquez	31 July 1971		?	(Mexico) Guadalajara
20	GK	Ángel Maldonado	8 September 1973		?	(Mexico) América

== Morocco ==
Head coach: (Germany) Werner Olk

No.	Pos.	Player	DoB	Age	Caps	Club	Tournament games	Tournament goals	Minutes played	Sub off	Sub on	Cards yellow/red
1	GK	Mustafa Achab	29 September 1969	22	?	(Morocco) Wydad Casablanca
2	DF	Rachid Azzouzi	10 January 1971	21	?	(Germany) MSV Duisburg
3	DF	Abdelkrim El Hadrioui	6 March 1972	20	?	(Morocco) FAR Rabat
4	DF	Mouloud Moudakkar	5 March 1970	22	?	(Morocco) Union Sidi Kacem
5	DF	Mouhcine Bouhlal	22 April 1970	22	?	(Morocco) FAR Rabat
6	DF	Noureddine Naybet	10 February 1970	22	?	(Morocco) Wydad Casablanca
7	MF	Khalid Raghib	22 September 1969	22	?	(Morocco) RS Settat
8	MF	Hicham Dmiai	11 January 1971	21	?	(Morocco) KAC Marrakech
9	FW	Mohamed El Badraoui	27 June 1971	21	?	(Morocco) Raja Beni Mellal
10	MF	Saïd Rokbi	20 October 1969	22	?	(Morocco) RS Settat
11	FW	Mohamed Samadi	21 March 1970	22	?	(Morocco) FAR Rabat
12	MF	Aziz Azim	5 March 1970	22	?	(Morocco) Union Sidi Kacem
13	DF	Rachid Iddaoudi	2 August 1970	21	?	(Morocco) KAC Marrakech
14	DF	Lahcen Abrami	31 December 1969	22	?	(Morocco) Wydad Casablanca
15	MF	Abdelmajid Karaouane	24 January 1970	22	?	(Morocco) FAR Rabat
16	GK	Brahim Bougrine	17 August 1969	22	?	(Morocco) FUS Rabat
17	MF	Youssef Chippo	10 May 1973	19	?	(Morocco) KAC Kenitra
18	MF	Hussein Ammouta	24 October 1969	22	?	(Morocco) FUS Rabat
19	FW	Ahmed Bahja	21 December 1970	22	?	(Morocco) Kawkab Marrakech
20	GK	Mohamed Ibari Mansouri	25 November 1969	22	?	(Morocco) IR Tanger

== Paraguay ==
Head coach: (Uruguay) Sergio Markarián

No.	Pos.	Player	DoB	Age	Caps	Club	Tournament games	Tournament goals	Minutes played	Sub off	Sub on	Cards yellow/red
1	GK	Rubén Ruiz Díaz	11 November 1969	22	?	(Argentina) San Lorenzo	4	0
2	MF	Andrés Duarte	4 February 1972	20	?	(Paraguay) Cerro Porteño	4	0
3	DF	Osvaldo Peralta	2 February 1971	21	?	(Paraguay) Guaraní
4	DF	Juan Ramon Jara	6 August 1970	21	?	(Paraguay) Olimpia Asunción	4	0
5	DF	Celso Ayala	20 August 1970	21	?	(Paraguay) Olimpia Asunción	4	0
6	DF	Carlos Gamarra	17 February 1971	21	?	(Paraguay) Cerro Porteño	4	1
7	FW	Francisco Ferreira	17 September 1970	21	?	(Paraguay) Sportivo Luqueño	4	0
8	MF	Hugo Sosa	26 November 1970	21	?	(Paraguay) Sportivo Luqueño	4	0
9	DF	Arsenio Benítez	14 December 1971	20	?	(Paraguay) Sportivo Luqueño	1	0
10	FW	Gustavo Neffa	3 November 1971	20	?	(Argentina) Boca Juniors	3	0
11	FW	Julio César Yegros	31 January 1971	21	?	(Paraguay) Cerro Porteño	1	0
12	GK	César Velázquez	16 September 1972	19	?	(Argentina) Independiente
13	DF	Juan Marecos	21 August 1969	22	?	(Paraguay) Libertad	1	0
14	DF	Ricardo Sanabria	31 October 1969	22	?	(Paraguay) Cerro Porteño	4	0
15	MF	Guido Alvarenga	24 August 1970	21	?	(Argentina) Textil Mandiyú	2	0
16	DF	Francisco Arce	2 April 1971	21	?	(Paraguay) Cerro Porteño	4	1
17	MF	Héctor Sosa	7 April 1971	21	?	(Paraguay) Colegiales
18	MF	Harles Bourdier	14 August 1972	19	?	(Paraguay) Olimpia Asunción	1	0
19	FW	Mauro Caballero	3 May 1972	20	?	(Paraguay) Olimpia Asunción	2	1
20	FW	Jorge Luis Campos	11 August 1970	21	?	(Paraguay) Olimpia Asunción	4	2

== Poland ==
Head coach: Janusz Wójcik

No.	Pos.	Player	DoB	Age	Caps	Club	Tournament games	Tournament goals	Minutes played	Sub off	Sub on	Cards yellow/red
1	GK	Aleksander Kłak	24 November 1970	21	0	(Poland) Igloopol Dębica	6	0
2	DF	Marcin Jałocha	17 March 1971	22	0	(Poland) Wisła Kraków	6	1
3	DF	Tomasz Łapiński	1 August 1969	22	0	(Poland) Widzew Łódź	6	0
4	DF	Marek Koźmiński	7 February 1971	21	0	(Poland) Hutnik Kraków	6	1
5	DF	Tomasz Wałdoch	10 May 1971	21	3	(Poland) Górnik Zabrze	6	0
6	MF	Dariusz Gęsior	9 October 1969	22	0	(Poland) Ruch Chorzów	5	0
7	MF	Piotr Świerczewski	8 April 1972	20	0	(Poland) GKS Katowice	5	0
8	MF	Dariusz Adamczuk	20 October 1969	22	1	(Poland) Pogoń Szczecin	5	0
9	FW	Grzegorz Mielcarski	19 March 1971	21	1	(Poland) Olimpia Poznań	1	1
10	MF	Jerzy Brzęczek	18 March 1971	21	1	(Poland) Lech Poznań	6	0
11	FW	Andrzej Juskowiak	3 November 1970	21	1	(Poland) Lech Poznań	6	7
12	GK	Arkadiusz Onyszko	12 January 1974	18	0	(Poland) Zawisza Bydgoszcz	0	0
13	MF	Ryszard Staniek	13 March 1971	21	0	(Poland) Górnik Zabrze	6	2
14	DF	Marek Bajor	10 January 1970	22	0	(Poland) Widzew Łódź	3	0
15	FW	Andrzej Kobylański	31 July 1970	22	0	(Poland) Siarka Tarnobrzeg	3	0
16	FW	Mirosław Waligóra	4 February 1970	22	0	(Poland) Hutnik Kraków	1	0
17	MF	Dariusz Szubert	31 October 1970	21	0	(Poland) Pogoń Szczecin	0	0
18	MF	Tomasz Wieszczycki	21 December 1971	20	0	(Poland) ŁKS Łódź	0	0
19	MF	Dariusz Koseła	12 February 1970	22	0	(Poland) Górnik Zabrze	0	0
20	FW	Wojciech Kowalczyk	14 April 1972	20	4	(Poland) Legia Warsaw	6	4

== Qatar ==
Head coach: (Brazil) Evaristo de Macedo

No.	Pos.	Player	DoB	Age	Caps	Club	Tournament games	Tournament goals	Minutes played	Sub off	Sub on	Cards yellow/red
1	GK	Ahmed Khalil Al-Khaldi	17 October 1969	19	?	(Qatar) Al Arabi
2	DF	Hamad Mubarak Al-Attiya	22 August 1971	19	?	(Qatar) Al Rayyan
3	MF	Rashid Suwaid	5 September 1973	18	?	(Qatar) Al Rayyan
4	DF	Zamel Essa Al-Kuwari	23 August 1973	18	?	(Qatar) Al Rayyan
5	MF	Abdulnasser Al Obaidly	2 October 1972	19	?	(Qatar) Al Sadd
6	FW	Waleed Bakhit Maayof	29 November 1972	19	?	Qatar SC
7	FW	Mubarak Mustafa	30 March 1973	19	?	(Qatar) Al Arabi
8	DF	Juma Salem Johar	20 August 1970	21	?	(Qatar) Al Wakrah
9	FW	Mahmoud Soufi	20 October 1971	20	?	(Qatar) Al Gharafa
10	MF	Fahad Rashid Al-Kuwari	19 December 1973	18	?	(Qatar) Al Sadd
11	FW	Adel Mulla Al-Mulla	7 December 1970	22	?	(Qatar) Al Arabi
12	GK	Amer Al Kaabi	1 March 1971	21	?	(Qatar) Al Ahli SC
13	DF	Yousuf Adam Mahmoud	12 September 1972	19	?	(Qatar) Al Gharafa
14	FW	Waleed Ibrahim	12 October 1973	18	?	(Qatar) Al Ahli SC
15	MF	Abdulla Basheer	17 September 1971	20	?	(Qatar) Al Rayyan
16	DF	Mohamed Al-Mohannadi	10 October 1972	19	?	(Qatar) Al Sadd
17	MF	Jafal Rashed Al-Kuwari	27 September 1972	19	?	(Qatar) Al Sadd
18	MF	Abdulaziz Jalouf	27 February 1973	19	?	Qatar SC
19	FW	Khaled Habib Al-Waheebi	1 December 1970	21	?	(Qatar) Al Sadd
20	GK	Fareed Mahboub	13 July 1971	21	?	(Qatar) Al Rayyan

== Spain ==
Head coach: Vicente Miera

No.	Pos.	Player	DoB	Age	Caps	Club	Tournament games	Tournament goals	Minutes played	Sub off	Sub on	Cards yellow/red
1	GK	Santiago Cañizares	18 December 1969	22	6	(Spain) Mérida
2	DF	Albert Ferrer	6 June 1970	22	?	(Spain) Barcelona	5		450			2/0
3	DF	Mikel Lasa	9 September 1971	21	?	(Spain) Real Madrid	6		501	1
4	DF	Roberto Solozábal	15 September 1969	22	?	(Spain) Atlético Madrid	6	1	540
5	DF	Juanma López	3 September 1969	22	?	(Spain) Atlético Madrid	4		293			0/1
6	MF	David Villabona	5 December 1969	22	?	(Spain) Athletic Bilbao	2		34		2	1/0
7	MF	José Amavisca	19 June 1971	21	?	(Spain) Lleida	3		130	1	2
8	MF	Luis Enrique	8 May 1970	22	?	(Spain) Real Madrid	6	1	540
9	MF	Pep Guardiola	18 January 1971	21	?	(Spain) Barcelona	6	1	474	2		1/0
10	DF	Abelardo Fernández	19 March 1970	22	?	(Spain) Sporting de Gijón	5	2	413			0/1
11	FW	Javier Manjarín	31 December 1969	22	?	(Spain) Sporting de Gijón
12	DF	Paqui	6 December 1970	21	?	(Spain) Tenerife
13	GK	Toni Jiménez	12 October 1970	21	?	(Spain) Figueres	6		540
14	MF	Gabriel Vidal	5 October 1969	22	?	(Spain) Mallorca	2		9		2
15	MF	Paco Soler	5 March 1970	22	?	(Spain) Mallorca	4	1	277		1
16	DF	Miguel Hernández	19 February 1970	22	?	(Spain) Rayo Vallecano	2		118		1
17	DF	Rafael Berges	21 January 1971	21	?	(Spain) Tenerife	6	2	535	1		1/0
18	FW	Antonio Pinilla	25 February 1971	21	?	(Spain) Mallorca	2		33		2
19	FW	Kiko	26 April 1972	20	?	(Spain) Cádiz	6	5	520	3
20	FW	Alfonso Pérez	26 September 1972	19	?	(Spain) Real Madrid	5	1	401	2		2/0

== Sweden ==
Head coach: Nisse Andersson

No.	Pos.	Player	Date of birth (age)	Caps	Goals	Club
1	GK	Jan Ekholm	3 December 1969 (aged 22)	0	0	(Swedish Football Association) IFK Sundsvall
2	DF	Magnus Johansson	10 November 1971 (aged 20)	0	0	(Swedish Football Association) IFK Göteborg
3	DF	Joachim Björklund	15 March 1971 (aged 21)	0	0	(Norwegian Football Federation) Brann
4	DF	Filip Apelstav	18 September 1971 (aged 20)	0	0	(Swedish Football Association) Västra Frölunda IF
5	MF	Niclas Alexandersson	29 December 1971 (aged 20)	0	0	(Swedish Football Association) Halmstads BK
6	MF	Håkan Mild	14 June 1971 (aged 21)	0	0	(Swedish Football Association) IFK Göteborg
7	DF	Patrik Andersson (captain)	18 August 1971 (aged 20)	0	0	(Swedish Football Association) Malmö FF
8	MF	Stefan Landberg	5 May 1970 (aged 22)	0	0	(Swedish Football Association) Östers IF
9	MF	Christer Fursth	6 July 1970 (aged 22)	0	0	(Swedish Football Association) Örebro SK
10	FW	Jonny Rödlund	22 December 1971 (aged 20)	0	0	(Swedish Football Association) IFK Norrköping
11	FW	Tomas Brolin	29 November 1969 (aged 22)	0	0	(Italian Football Federation) Parma
12	GK	Håkan Svensson	20 January 1970 (aged 22)	0	0	(Swedish Football Association) Halmstads BK
13	MF	Jesper Jansson	8 January 1971 (aged 21)	0	0	(Swedish Football Association) Östers IF
14	DF	Jörgen Moberg	2 June 1971 (aged 21)	0	0	(Swedish Football Association) Östers IF
15	DF	Björn Lilius	2 June 1970 (aged 22)	0	0	(Swedish Football Association) Helsingborgs IF
16	DF	Henrik Nilsson	25 July 1972 (aged 19)	0	0	(Swedish Football Association) Malmö FF
17	MF	Anders Andersson	15 March 1974 (aged 18)	0	0	(Swedish Football Association) Malmö FF
18	FW	Pascal Simpson	4 May 1971 (aged 21)	0	0	(Swedish Football Association) AIK
19	FW	Niklas Gudmundsson	29 February 1972 (aged 20)	0	0	(Swedish Football Association) Halmstads BK
20	FW	Jonas Axeldal	2 September 1970 (aged 21)	0	0	(Swedish Football Association) Malmö FF

== United States ==
Head coach: Lothar Osiander

No.	Pos.	Player	DoB	Age	Caps	Club	Tournament games	Tournament goals	Minutes played	Sub off	Sub on	Cards yellow/red
1	GK	Brad Friedel	18 May 1971	21	10	(United States) UCLA	3	0	270
2	DF	Cam Rast	16 January 1970	22	6	(United States) Santa Clara University	2	0	180
3	DF	Alexi Lalas	1 June 1970	22	9		1	0	90
4	DF	Mike Burns	14 September 1970	21	?
5	DF	Erik Imler	1 June 1971	21	?	(United States) Virginia Cavaliers
6	MF	Dario Brose	27 January 1970	22	?	(France) Stade Briochin
7	FW	Dante Washington	21 November 1970	21	?	(United States) Radford
8	DF	Mike Lapper	28 August 1970	19	?
9	FW	Steve Snow	2 March 1971	21	?	(Belgium) Standard Liège
10	MF	Claudio Reyna	20 July 1973	19	?	(United States) Virginia Cavaliers
11	MF	Yari Allnutt	2 February 1970	22	?	(United States) University of Portland
12	DF	Troy Dayak	21 January 1971	21	?	(United States) San Francisco Bay Blackhawks
13	FW	Joe-Max Moore	23 February 1971	21	?	(United States) UCLA Bruins
14	MF	Cobi Jones	16 June 1970	22	?
15	DF	Zak Ibsen	2 June 1972	20	?	(United States) UCLA
16	MF	Manny Lagos	11 June 1971	21	?	(United States) Minnesota Thunder
17	MF	Mike Huwiler	1 April 1972	20	?	(United States) Virginia Cavaliers
18	GK	Ian Feuer	20 May 1971	21	?	(Belgium) Molenbeek
19	MF	Chris Henderson	11 December 1970	21	?	(United States) Seattle Storm
20	DF	Curt Onalfo	19 November 1969	22	?	(France) La Ciotat
