= 1987 FIFA U-16 World Championship squads =

== Group A ==
=== Italy ===
Head coach: (Italy) Comunardo Niccolai

No.	Pos.	Player	Date of birth (age)	Caps	Club
1	GK	Silvio Lafuenti	9 August 1970 (aged 16)		(Italy) Milan
2	DF	Giovanni Di Rocco	27 December 1970 (aged 16)		(Italy) Napoli
3	DF	Donatello Gasparini	29 July 1971 (aged 15)		(Italy) Torino
4	DF	Ildebrando Stafico	12 October 1970 (aged 16)		(Italy) Internazionale
5	DF	Davide Grosso	5 November 1970 (aged 16)		(Italy) Milan
6	MF	Marcello Melli	8 July 1971 (aged 15)		(Italy) Parma
7	MF	Alessandro Brunetti	5 February 1971 (aged 16)		(Italy) Torino
8	DF	Gianluca Pessotto	11 August 1970 (aged 16)		(Italy) Milan
9	MF	Fabio Gallo	11 September 1970 (aged 16)		(Italy) Internazionale
10	MF	Andrea Bianchi	25 August 1970 (aged 16)		(Italy) Roma
11	FW	Massimiliano Cappellini	21 January 1971 (aged 16)		(Italy) Milan
12	GK	Davide Micillo	17 April 1971 (aged 16)		(Italy) Juventus
13	DF	Lorenzo Amoruso	28 June 1971 (aged 15)		(Italy) Bari
14	MF	Daniele Morra	25 August 1971 (aged 15)		(Italy) Lazio
15	DF	Carlo Bocchialini	8 October 1970 (aged 16)		(Italy) Parma
16	MF	Vincenzo Esposito	6 January 1971 (aged 16)		(Italy) Valdiano
17	FW	Andrea Villa	25 September 1970 (aged 16)		(Italy) Atalanta
18	FW	Libero Manfredi	19 May 1971 (aged 16)		(Italy) Avellino

=== Canada ===
Head coach: (Canada) Brian Hughes

No.	Pos.	Player	Date of birth (age)	Caps	Club
1	GK	Antoine Lagarec	3 September 1970 (aged 16)		(Canada) Ottawa Pioneers
2	DF	Cam Bowman	28 June 1971 (aged 15)		(Canada) Vancouver City
3	DF	Paul Boyle	16 October 1970 (aged 16)		(Canada) Wexford
4	MF	Carl Fletcher	26 December 1971 (aged 15)		(Canada) Scarborough Blues
5	DF	André Belotte	2 June 1971 (aged 16)		(Canada) Montreal Supra
6	DF	Steve MacDonald	13 October 1970 (aged 16)		(Canada) Vancouver City
7	FW	Paul Peschisolido	25 May 1971 (aged 16)		(Canada) Scarborough Blues
8	MF	Kevin Holness	25 September 1971 (aged 15)		(Canada) FC Blitz
9	FW	Guido Titotto	30 April 1971 (aged 16)		(Canada) Cliff Avenue United
10	MF	Jack Wendt	23 February 1971 (aged 16)		(Canada) Lynn Valley
11	MF	Rob Csabai	3 August 1970 (aged 16)		(Canada) Vancouver City
12	DF	Kyle McGuffin	18 February 1971 (aged 16)		(Canada) London City
13	MF	Joaquin Gonzales	30 October 1970 (aged 16)		(Canada) Dundas
14	FW	Sandro Césario	10 May 1972 (aged 15)		(Canada) Toronto Italia
15	MF	Gad Esposito	1 May 1971 (aged 16)		(Canada) Hispanic
16	FW	Darren Fernandes	21 September 1971 (aged 15)		(Canada) Scarborough Blues
17	DF	Rick Zenari	5 December 1971 (aged 15)		(Canada) Edmonton Juventus
18	GK	Jason Maros	20 August 1971 (aged 15)		(Canada) Westminster

=== Qatar ===
Head coach: (Brazil) Humberto Redes Filho

No.	Pos.	Player	Date of birth (age)	Caps	Club
1	GK	Fareed Mahboub	13 July 1971 (aged 15)		(Qatar) Al-Rayyan
2	DF	Jumah Johar	28 August 1970 (aged 16)		(Qatar) Al-Wakrah
3	DF	Abdullah Mohamed	15 September 1970 (aged 16)		(Qatar) Al-Arabi
4	DF	Hamad Al-Mannai	8 August 1970 (aged 16)		Qatar SC
5	MF	Edrees Khairi	20 September 1971 (aged 15)		(Qatar) Al-Sadd
6	DF	Abdullah Hassan	4 October 1972 (aged 14)		(Qatar) Al-Wakrah
7	MF	Tariq Dekhayel	11 September 1971 (aged 15)		Qatar SC
8	MF	Rashid Suwaid	5 September 1973 (aged 13)		(Qatar) Al-Rayyan
9	FW	Salmeen Mubarak	13 September 1972 (aged 14)		(Qatar) Al-Tawoon
10	MF	Fahad Al-Kuwari	19 December 1973 (aged 13)		(Qatar) Al-Tadamon
11	FW	Kareem Ahmed	10 August 1971 (aged 15)		(Qatar) Al-Arabi
12	MF	Sultan Al-Kawari	14 August 1971 (aged 15)		(Qatar) Al-Tadamon
13	MF	Zamel Al-Kuwari	23 August 1973 (aged 13)		(Qatar) Al-Shamal
14	MF	Abdullah Al-Burshaid	3 December 1970 (aged 16)		(Qatar) Al-Wakrah
15	MF	Abdulla Yousuf	20 August 1971 (aged 15)		Qatar SC
16	FW	Hassan Bushaya	15 August 1970 (aged 16)		(Qatar) Al-Arabi
17	DF	Jamal Abdullah	30 August 1970 (aged 16)		Qatar SC
18	GK	Ibrahim Al-Derhim	7 August 1970 (aged 16)		(Qatar) Al-Shamal

=== Egypt ===
Head coach: (Egypt) Taha Basry

No.	Pos.	Player	Date of birth (age)	Caps	Club
1	GK	Basem Khairat	17 August 1970 (aged 16)		(Egypt) El Shams
2	GK	Soliman El Sayed	20 October 1970 (aged 16)		(Egypt) El-Ismaily
3	DF	Mohamed Youssef	9 October 1970 (aged 16)		(Egypt) Al Ahly
4	MF	Mohamed Abdel Rahman	17 November 1970 (aged 16)		(Egypt) El-Mehalla
5	DF	Yehia Nabil Khaled	4 September 1971 (aged 15)		(Egypt) Zamalek
6	MF	Abdel Raouf El Karwa	5 September 1970 (aged 16)		(Egypt) El-Mehalla
7	FW	Mohamed Ramadan	11 September 1970 (aged 16)		(Egypt) Tersana
8	FW	Khalil Sameh	15 December 1971 (aged 15)		(Egypt) Zamalek
9	FW	Gamal Musaed	24 March 1971 (aged 16)		(Egypt) Al Ahly
10	MF	Sherif El Rifaie	15 August 1971 (aged 15)		(Egypt) Zamalek
11	DF	Tamer Abdul Hamid	16 October 1971 (aged 15)		(Egypt) Zamalek
12	MF	Hany Hussain	22 September 1970 (aged 16)		(Egypt) Al Ahly
13	DF	Sayed Fouad	15 October 1970 (aged 16)		(Egypt) Al Ahly
14	MF	Moustafa Ibrahim	1 August 1970 (aged 16)		(Egypt) Zamalek
15	MF	Walid Salah El-Din	27 October 1971 (aged 15)		(Egypt) Al Ahly
16	DF	Hazem Ibrahim	2 September 1970 (aged 16)		(Egypt) Zamalek
17	GK	Essam Abdelazim	1 November 1970 (aged 16)		(Egypt) Tersana
18	DF	Mohamed Abdel Azim	6 January 1971 (aged 16)		(Egypt) El-Masry

== Group B ==
=== Ivory Coast ===
Head coach: (Ivory Coast) Roger Koffi

No.	Pos.	Player	Date of birth (age)	Caps	Club
1	GK	Mamadou Kanigui	9 September 1970 (aged 16)		(Ivory Coast) ASEC Abidjan
2	DF	Gboignon Dagbei	18 December 1970 (aged 16)		(Ivory Coast) Stade d'Abidjan
3	DF	Gbaka Koloko	16 December 1973 (aged 13)		(Ivory Coast) Stade d'Abidjan
4	DF	Abdoulaye Koné	12 July 1971 (aged 15)		(Ivory Coast) Stade d'Abidjan
5	DF	Bangali Bamba	2 August 1970 (aged 16)		(Ivory Coast) ASEC Abidjan
6	MF	Issa Traoré	9 January 1971 (aged 16)		(Ivory Coast) Africa Sports
7	FW	Moussa Traoré	25 December 1971 (aged 15)		(Ivory Coast) Rio Anyama
8	MF	Moussa Konaté	11 April 1972 (aged 15)		(Ivory Coast) ASEC Abidjan
9	FW	Théophile Beda	5 March 1971 (aged 16)		(Ivory Coast) ASEC Abidjan
10	MF	Michel Bassole	18 July 1972 (aged 14)		(Ivory Coast) ASEC Abidjan
11	MF	Lama Dea	6 April 1971 (aged 16)		(Ivory Coast) Stella Club
12	FW	Dégri Gae	12 October 1970 (aged 16)		(Ivory Coast) Africa Sports
13	DF	Guy Akosso	29 December 1970 (aged 16)		(Ivory Coast) Stade d'Abidjan
14	MF	Félix Kra	25 November 1971 (aged 15)		(Ivory Coast) Stella Club
15	MF	Serge Maguy	20 October 1970 (aged 16)		(Ivory Coast) ASEC Abidjan
16	GK	Losseni Konaté	29 December 1972 (aged 14)		(Ivory Coast) Stella Club
17	MF	Eddie Kacou	15 December 1973 (aged 13)		(Ivory Coast) ASEC Abidjan
18	FW	Jean-Marius Zézé	22 December 1972 (aged 14)		(Ivory Coast) Stade d'Abidjan

=== South Korea ===
Head coach: (South Korea) Kim Sam-Rak

No.	Pos.	Player	Date of birth (age)	Caps	Club
1	GK	Cho Hyun-Kon	16 October 1970 (aged 16)		(South Korea) Yongmoon High School
2	DF	Jang Jeong-Hoon	17 September 1970 (aged 16)		(South Korea) Yongmoon High School
3	DF	Kim Doo-Sun	24 December 1970 (aged 16)		(South Korea) Dongbuk High School
4	DF	Kim Byung-Soo	24 November 1970 (aged 16)		(South Korea) Kyungshin High School
5	DF	An Jin-Kyu	18 October 1970 (aged 16)		(South Korea) Induk Technical School
6	DF	Chung Kwang-Suk	1 December 1970 (aged 16)		(South Korea) Dongbuk High School
7	FW	Seo Jung-Won	17 December 1970 (aged 16)		(South Korea) Geoje High School
8	MF	Oh Sang-Kyun	11 November 1970 (aged 16)		(South Korea) Paichai High School
9	FW	Lee Tae-Hong	1 October 1971 (aged 15)		(South Korea) Daegu Technical School
10	MF	Shin Tae-Yong	11 October 1970 (aged 16)		(South Korea) Daegu Technical School
11	MF	Kim In-Wan	13 February 1971 (aged 16)		(South Korea) Daejeon Commercial School
12	FW	Kwon Tae-Suk	11 November 1970 (aged 16)		(South Korea) Sudo Technical School
13	MF	Lim Wan-Sub	15 August 1971 (aged 15)		(South Korea) Han Yang Technical School
14	MF	Noh Jung-Yoon	28 March 1971 (aged 16)		(South Korea) Boo Pyung High School
15	DF	Shon Swung-Wan	9 September 1972 (aged 14)		(South Korea) Hanyang Technical School
16	MF	Kang Moon-Suk	8 September 1970 (aged 16)		(South Korea) Bupyeong High School
17	FW	Kim Ho-Chul	5 January 1971 (aged 16)		(South Korea) Bupyeong High School
18	GK	Kim Bong-Soo	4 December 1970 (aged 16)		(South Korea) Sudo Electric Technical High School

=== United States ===
Head coach: (United States) Roy Rees

No.	Pos.	Player	Date of birth (age)	Caps	Club
1	GK	Drew Burwash	26 August 1970 (aged 16)		(United States) Cape Coral Tornado
2	DF	Troy Dayak	29 January 1971 (aged 16)		(United States) Livermore SC
3	DF	Mike Burns	14 September 1970 (aged 16)		(United States) Marlborough SC
4	DF	Tom O'Connor	17 October 1970 (aged 16)		(United States) Sunnyvale United
5	DF	Peter Cochran	12 January 1971 (aged 16)		(United States) Tualatin Hills United
6	MF	Erik Imler	1 June 1971 (aged 16)		(United States) Bowie Strikers
7	MF	Tim Gallegos	30 October 1970 (aged 16)		(United States) Striker United
8	MF	Chad Deering	2 September 1970 (aged 16)		(United States) Dallas Comets
9	FW	Steve Snow	2 March 1971 (aged 16)		(United States) Maroon SC
10	FW	Ben Crawley	5 June 1971 (aged 16)		(United States) Austin Flyers
11	FW	Gil Kang	5 August 1971 (aged 15)		(United States) Philadelphia Suburban
12	MF	Scott McDaniel	8 January 1971 (aged 16)		(United States) Busch SC
13	MF	Marco Ferruzzi	15 October 1970 (aged 16)		(United States) Austin Capitols
14	DF	Lance Killian	24 February 1971 (aged 16)		(United States) F.C. Portland
15	DF	Brian Scott	1 September 1970 (aged 16)		(United States) Eastside Crossfire
16	FW	Mike Smith	13 November 1970 (aged 16)		(United States) Oceanside United
17	MF	Nelson Medina	22 April 1971 (aged 16)		(United States) La Jolla Nomads
18	GK	Mark Dulle	6 August 1970 (aged 16)		(United States) Liebe SC

=== Ecuador ===
Head coach: (Ecuador) Eduardo Macias Villegas

No.	Pos.	Player	Date of birth (age)	Caps	Club
1	GK	Erwin Ramírez	13 November 1971 (aged 15)		(Ecuador) Deportivo Quevedo
2	DF	José Muñoz	1 March 1971 (aged 16)		(Ecuador) Barcelona
3	DF	Raúl Noriega	4 January 1970 (aged 17)		(Ecuador) Barcelona
4	DF	Nelson Toral	27 June 1971 (aged 15)		(Ecuador) Filanbanco
5	MF	José Macias	13 August 1970 (aged 16)		(Ecuador) Filancard
6	DF	Lucitanio Castro	27 June 1971 (aged 15)		(Ecuador) Barcelona
7	MF	Rafael Mejía	17 August 1970 (aged 16)		(Ecuador) Filanbanco
8	FW	Víctor Ramos	28 July 1971 (aged 15)		(Ecuador) Emelec
9	FW	Segundo Mina	29 September 1970 (aged 16)		(Ecuador) Filancard
10	MF	César Carchi	20 February 1971 (aged 16)		(Ecuador) Bernardo Valdivieso
11	MF	Anzor Filian	29 September 1970 (aged 16)		(Ecuador) Filanbanco
12	GK	Helmut Moeller	5 April 1971 (aged 16)		(Ecuador) Barcelona
13	DF	Jorge Aguilar	27 March 1971 (aged 16)		(Ecuador) Club Deportivo Quevedo
14	MF	José Rodríguez	16 October 1970 (aged 16)		(Ecuador) Calvi Futbol Club
15	MF	Hjalmar Zambrano	23 April 1971 (aged 16)		(Ecuador) Filanbanco
16	FW	Aldrin Reyes	30 July 1971 (aged 15)		(Ecuador) 9 de Octubre
17	FW	José Albán	30 October 1970 (aged 16)		(Ecuador) Barcelona
18	DF	May Gutiérrez	3 October 1971 (aged 15)		(Ecuador) LDU Quito

== Group C ==
=== Brazil ===
Head coach: (Brazil) José de Souza Teixeira

No.	Pos.	Player	Date of birth (age)	Caps	Club
1	GK	Carlos Germano	14 August 1970 (aged 16)		(Brazil) Vasco da Gama
2	DF	Mário Carlos	14 August 1970 (aged 16)		(Brazil) Flamengo
3	DF	Sandro	16 December 1970 (aged 16)		(Brazil) Ponte Preta
4	DF	Rogério	20 March 1971 (aged 16)		(Brazil) Flamengo
5	MF	Alexandre	13 February 1971 (aged 16)		(Brazil) Juventus
6	DF	Marco Antônio	11 August 1970 (aged 16)		(Brazil) Grêmio
7	MF	Paulo Nunes	30 October 1971 (aged 15)		(Brazil) Flamengo
8	MF	Marcelo	26 August 1970 (aged 16)		(Brazil) Vitória
9	FW	Bentinho	18 December 1971 (aged 15)		(Brazil) São Paulo
10	MF	Assis	10 January 1971 (aged 16)		(Brazil) Grêmio
11	FW	Marco Antônio II	24 December 1970 (aged 16)		(Brazil) Santos
12	GK	Édson	22 January 1971 (aged 16)		(Brazil) Ponte Preta
13	DF	Leonardo	14 October 1970 (aged 16)		(Brazil) XV de Jaú
14	FW	Marco Antônio III	11 February 1971 (aged 16)		(Brazil) Portuguesa
15	MF	José Mauricio	23 November 1970 (aged 16)		(Brazil) Vasco da Gama
16	DF	André Gustavo	13 January 1971 (aged 16)		(Brazil) Ponte Preta
17	FW	Alvaro José	20 August 1970 (aged 16)		(Brazil) América
18	MF	Sonny Anderson	19 September 1970 (aged 16)		(Brazil) XV de Jaú

=== France ===
Head coach: (France) Jean-Pierre Morlans

No.	Pos.	Player	Date of birth (age)	Caps	Club
1	GK	Olivier Oudet	25 September 1970 (aged 16)		(France) Auxerre
2	DF	Benjamin Sutter	21 September 1970 (aged 16)		(France) Lyon
3	FW	Fabrice Albertier	3 November 1970 (aged 16)		(France) Racing Club
4	DF	Gilles Giuliano	7 October 1970 (aged 16)		(France) AS Mazargues
5	MF	Emmanuel Petit	22 September 1970 (aged 16)		(France) AS Monaco
6	DF	Marc Leduc	19 January 1971 (aged 16)		(France) AS Monaco
7	MF	Mickaël Debève	1 December 1970 (aged 16)		(France) Toulouse
8	MF	David Delbarre	24 September 1970 (aged 16)		(France) Auxerre
9	FW	Franck Soler	3 October 1970 (aged 16)		(France) Auxerre
10	FW	Stéphane Roche	25 September 1970 (aged 16)		(France) Lyon
11	MF	Roland Lagaronne	23 November 1970 (aged 16)		(France) Bordeaux
12	MF	Thierry Pidery	27 September 1970 (aged 16)		(France) AS Mazargues
13	DF	Gilles Adrian	16 August 1970 (aged 16)		(France) Toulouse
14	FW	David Rincon	3 August 1970 (aged 16)		(France) Paris Saint-Germain
15	DF	Avelino de Vasconcelos	3 March 1971 (aged 16)		(France) Paris Saint-Germain
16	GK	Samuel Toutain	19 November 1970 (aged 16)		(France) Le Havre
17	DF	Franck Rabarivony	15 November 1970 (aged 16)		(France) Auxerre
18	MF	Jérémie Sutter	21 September 1970 (aged 16)		(France) Lyon

=== Saudi Arabia ===
Head coach: (Saudi Arabia) Mohammed Al-Kharashy

No.	Pos.	Player	Date of birth (age)	Caps	Club
1	GK	Musa Bedewi	20 October 1970 (aged 16)		(Saudi Arabia) Al-Wahda
2	MF	Khalid Al-Muwallid	23 November 1971 (aged 15)		(Saudi Arabia) Al-Ahli
3	MF	Mohammed Shalgan	28 October 1970 (aged 16)		(Saudi Arabia) Al-Nassr
4	DF	Mohammed Feraij	11 November 1971 (aged 15)		(Saudi Arabia) Al-Ittihad
5	DF	Abdullah Saleh Al-Dosari	23 November 1970 (aged 16)		(Saudi Arabia) Al-Qadisiya
6	FW	Mohammed Al-Khalifah	17 January 1971 (aged 16)		(Saudi Arabia) Al-Hajar
7	FW	Musa Al-Harbi	3 December 1971 (aged 15)		(Saudi Arabia) Al-Ansar
8	DF	Musaed Al-Terair	31 August 1970 (aged 16)		(Saudi Arabia) Al-Ansar
9	FW	Mohammed Al-Sewailem	24 August 1970 (aged 16)		(Saudi Arabia) Al-Akhadoud
10	MF	Mansour Al-Muwaine	24 October 1970 (aged 16)		(Saudi Arabia) Al-Hilal
11	FW	Turki Zayed	15 October 1970 (aged 16)		(Saudi Arabia) Al-Nakhil
12	GK	Mohammed Bamasoud	21 November 1970 (aged 16)		(Saudi Arabia) Al-Hilal
13	GK	Hassan Adam	5 August 1970 (aged 16)		(Saudi Arabia) Al-Ittihad
14	MF	Mohammed Al-Farhan	8 September 1970 (aged 16)		(Saudi Arabia) Al-Qadisiya
15	DF	Saad Al-Henaidi	17 December 1970 (aged 16)		(Saudi Arabia) Al-Kawkab
16	DF	Mohammed Al-Zubair	2 November 1970 (aged 16)		(Saudi Arabia) Al-Riyadh
17	MF	Abdulrahman Al-Hamdan	17 August 1970 (aged 16)		(Saudi Arabia) Al-Shabab
18	MF	Abdullah Al-Toraiqi	8 December 1971 (aged 15)		(Saudi Arabia) Al-Nassr

=== Australia ===
Head coach: (Australia) Vic Dalgleish

No.	Pos.	Player	Date of birth (age)	Caps	Club
1	GK	John Russell	2 March 1971 (aged 16)		(Australia) West Wallsend
2	DF	Louis Triantafyllou	6 October 1970 (aged 16)		(Australia) Sydney Olympic
3	DF	Gregory Mills	6 August 1970 (aged 16)		(Australia) Australian Institute of Sport
4	DF	Dominic Longo	23 August 1970 (aged 16)		(Australia) Juventus Pioneers
5	DF	Steven Horvat	4 March 1971 (aged 16)		(Australia) Australian Institute of Sport
6	DF	Steve Georgakis	25 August 1970 (aged 16)		(Australia) Sydney Olympic
7	MF	Gregory Dickinson	20 May 1971 (aged 16)		(Australia) Melita Eagles
8	MF	Craig McGregor	15 January 1971 (aged 16)		(Australia) Highfields Azzurri
9	MF	Stephane Jee	30 April 1971 (aged 16)		(Australia) Sydney Olympic
10	MF	Darren Freiberg	28 September 1970 (aged 16)		(Australia) Coalstars
11	MF	Dean McWhirter	27 September 1970 (aged 16)		(Australia) Highfields Azzurri
12	MF	Steve Dimoudis	29 September 1970 (aged 16)		(Australia) St. George
13	FW	John Christopoulos	31 March 1971 (aged 16)		(Australia) Polonia Adelaide
14	MF	Matthew Bingley	16 August 1971 (aged 15)		(Australia) St. George
15	FW	Paolo Rago	8 April 1971 (aged 16)		(Australia) Melita Eagles
16	MF	Anthony Pisano	5 September 1971 (aged 15)		(Australia) A.P.I.A. Leichhardt
17	FW	Philip Richardson	23 August 1970 (aged 16)		(Australia) Frankston Pines
18	GK	Mark Bosnich	13 January 1972 (aged 15)		(Australia) Sydney Croatia

== Group D ==
=== Soviet Union ===
Head coach: (Soviet Union) Aleksandr Piskaryov

No.	Pos.	Player	Date of birth (age)	Caps	Club
1	GK	Yuri Okroshidze	23 August 1970 (aged 16)		(Soviet Union) Zenit Leningrad
2	DF	Arif Asadov	18 August 1970 (aged 16)		(Soviet Union) Neftchi Baku
3	DF	Yuriy Mokrytskyi	16 October 1970 (aged 16)		(Soviet Union) Karpaty Lviv
4	DF	Serhiy Bezhenar	9 August 1970 (aged 16)		(Soviet Union) Kolos Nikopol
5	DF	Yuriy Moroz	8 August 1970 (aged 16)		(Soviet Union) Dynamo Kyiv
6	MF	Oleg Matveev	18 August 1970 (aged 16)		(Soviet Union) Rostselmash Rostov
7	MF	Vladislav Kadyrov	16 October 1970 (aged 16)		(Soviet Union) Neftchi Baku
8	MF	Anatoliy Mushchynka	19 August 1970 (aged 16)		(Soviet Union) Karpaty Lviv
9	FW	Yuriy Nikiforov	16 September 1970 (aged 16)		(Soviet Union) Chornomorets Odesa
10	MF	Mirjalol Qosimov	17 September 1970 (aged 16)		(Soviet Union) Dynamo Moscow
11	FW	Sergei Arutyunian	23 March 1971 (aged 16)		(Soviet Union) Dynamo Sukhumi
12	DF	Irakli Ghelenava	9 September 1970 (aged 16)		(Soviet Union) Dynamo Sukhumi
13	MF	Valeriy Vysokos	13 December 1970 (aged 16)		(Soviet Union) Dynamo Kyiv
14	DF	Vyacheslav Tsaryov	4 May 1971 (aged 16)		(Soviet Union) Torpedo Moscow
15	FW	Mykola Rusyn	17 September 1970 (aged 16)		(Soviet Union) Dynamo Kyiv
16	GK	Viktor Guz	16 January 1971 (aged 16)		(Soviet Union) Rotor Volgograd
17	FW	Yuriy Marakov	30 October 1970 (aged 16)		(Soviet Union) Dynamo Kyiv
18	MF	Vladislav Lemish	20 August 1970 (aged 16)		(Soviet Union) Neftchi Baku

=== Nigeria ===
Head coach: (Nigeria) Sebastian Brodrick-Imasuen

No.	Pos.	Player	Date of birth (age)	Caps	Club
1	GK	Angus Ikeji	10 December 1970 (aged 16)		No club
2	DF	Tonworimi Duere	20 November 1970 (aged 16)		No club
3	MF	Baba Jibrin	23 April 1971 (aged 16)		No club
4	MF	Fatai Atere	1 August 1971 (aged 15)		No club
5	FW	Eli Ayuba	20 December 1972 (aged 14)		No club
6	MF	Taiwo Enegwea	29 June 1972 (aged 14)		No club
7	DF	Oladunni Oyekale	9 December 1972 (aged 14)		No club
8	MF	Albert Eke	30 October 1971 (aged 15)		No club
9	MF	Mohammed Oladimeji	24 July 1971 (aged 15)		No club
10	MF	Olusegun Fetuga	27 December 1972 (aged 14)		No club
11	FW	Anthony Emoedofu	1 December 1972 (aged 14)		No club
12	GK	Lemmy Isa	22 December 1972 (aged 14)		No club
13	DF	Peter Ogaba	24 September 1974 (aged 12)		No club
14	MF	Christopher Nwosu	6 October 1971 (aged 15)		No club
15	DF	Charles Obazee	11 August 1972 (aged 14)		No club
16	DF	Bawa Abdullahi	20 April 1972 (aged 15)		No club
17	FW	Philip Osondu	28 November 1971 (aged 15)		No club
18	DF	Sarafa Salami	16 July 1972 (aged 14)		No club

- Nigerian players were selected from school teams.

=== Mexico ===
Head coach: (Mexico) Jesús Del Muro

No.	Pos.	Player	Date of birth (age)	Caps	Club
1	GK	Félix Fernández	11 January 1967 (aged 20)		(Mexico) Texcoco
2	DF	Gerardo Carmona	26 November 1970 (aged 16)		(Mexico) Tecos UAG
3	DF	Leopoldo Guzmán	8 April 1971 (aged 16)		(Mexico) Cachorros Neza
4	MF	Juan Carlos Ortega	28 August 1970 (aged 16)		(Mexico) Cruz Azul
5	DF	Fulvio Palacios	3 August 1970 (aged 16)		(Mexico) Cruz Azul
6	MF	Agustin Valdes	12 August 1970 (aged 16)		(Mexico) América
7	MF	Gaspar Cisneros	6 January 1971 (aged 16)		(Mexico) Cachorros Neza
8	DF	José Luís Ortega	25 November 1970 (aged 16)		(Mexico) Tecos UAG
9	FW	Anselmo Sanabria	27 November 1970 (aged 16)		(Mexico) Atlante
10	MF	Fernando Soria	17 October 1970 (aged 16)		(Mexico) Querétaro
11	MF	Mario García	17 December 1970 (aged 16)		(Mexico) Atlante
12	GK	Oscar Resano	6 March 1971 (aged 16)		(Mexico) UNAM
13	MF	Sergio Salgado	12 November 1970 (aged 16)		(Mexico) UNAM
14	DF	Heriberto Padilla	10 October 1970 (aged 16)		(Mexico) Guadalajara
15	FW	Daniel Landa	4 September 1970 (aged 16)		(Mexico) Cobras
16	FW	Carlos Rivera	27 August 1970 (aged 16)		(Mexico) Cachorros Neza
17	MF	José Luís González	29 November 1970 (aged 16)		(Mexico) Atlante
18	FW	Ramiro Romero	26 January 1971 (aged 16)		(Mexico) Cruz Azul

=== Bolivia ===
Head coach: (Bolivia) Eduardo Rivero Aviles

No.	Pos.	Player	Date of birth (age)	Caps	Club
1	GK	Rafael Arrazola	21 November 1970 (aged 16)		(Bolivia) Tahuichi Academy
2	DF	Herbert Arandia	9 November 1972 (aged 14)		(Bolivia) Tahuichi Academy
3	MF	Erwin Aguilera	15 May 1971 (aged 16)		(Bolivia) Tahuichi Academy
4	FW	Herman Alberty	27 September 1970 (aged 16)		(Bolivia) Tahuichi Academy
5	MF	Marco Belmonte	4 August 1972 (aged 14)		(Bolivia) Tahuichi Academy
6	MF	Luis Cristaldo	31 August 1970 (aged 16)		(Bolivia) Tahuichi Academy
7	FW	Marco Etcheverry	26 September 1970 (aged 16)		(Bolivia) Tahuichi Academy
8	FW	Óscar Fernández	21 August 1970 (aged 16)		(Bolivia) Tahuichi Academy
9	FW	David Hurtado	29 August 1972 (aged 14)		(Bolivia) Tahuichi Academy
10	DF	Ko Ishikawa	10 August 1970 (aged 16)		(Bolivia) Tahuichi Academy
11	DF	Eduardo Jiguchi	4 August 1970 (aged 16)		(Bolivia) Tahuichi Academy
12	GK	Julio Encinas	19 October 1970 (aged 16)		(Bolivia) Tahuichi Academy
13	MF	Manuel Lobo	21 August 1970 (aged 16)		(Bolivia) Tahuichi Academy
14	DF	José Méndez	27 August 1970 (aged 16)		(Bolivia) Tahuichi Academy
15	MF	Jorge Marañón	11 September 1970 (aged 16)		(Bolivia) Tahuichi Academy
16	MF	Mario Ribera	7 September 1971 (aged 15)		(Bolivia) Tahuichi Academy
17	DF	Socrates Suárez	3 August 1970 (aged 16)		(Bolivia) Tahuichi Academy
18	DF	Marcos Urquiza	12 December 1970 (aged 16)		(Bolivia) Tahuichi Academy
