= Football at the 1991 Mediterranean Games – Men's team squads =

Below are the squads for the Football at the 1991 Mediterranean Games, hosted in Athens, Greece, and took place between 28 June and 12 July 1991. Teams were national Olympic sides.

== Group A ==
=== Egypt ===
Head coach: (Germany) Dietrich Weise

No.	Pos.	Player	Date of birth (age)	Caps	Club
	GK	Nader El-Sayed	31 December 1972 (aged 18)		(Egypt) Zamalek SC
	GK	Tarek Soliman	25 June 1973 (aged 18)		(Egypt) Al Mokawloon Al Arab SC
	DF	Tamer Abdul Hamid	16 October 1971 (aged 19)		(Egypt) Zamalek SC
	DF	Haytham Farouk	4 January 1971 (aged 20)		(Egypt) Olympic Club
	DF	Ahmed Nakhla	5 February 1971 (aged 20)		(Egypt) Al Mokawloon Al Arab SC
	DF	Hamza El Gamal	2 March 1970 (aged 21)		(Egypt) Ismaily SC
	DF	Sami El-Sheshini	23 January 1972 (aged 19)		(Egypt) Zamalek SC
	MF	Walid Salah El-Din	27 October 1971 (aged 19)		(Egypt) Al Ahly SC
	MF	Hady Khashaba	19 December 1972 (aged 18)		(Egypt) Al Ahly SC
	MF	Yasser Rayyan	25 March 1970 (aged 21)		(Egypt) El Mansoura SC
	FW	Karam Morsi			(Egypt) Al Ahly SC
	FW	Moustafa Sadek	31 January 1972 (aged 19)		(Egypt) Al Mokawloon Al Arab SC
	FW	Mohamed Salah Abo Gresha	11 January 1970 (aged 21)		(Egypt) Ismaily SC

=== Italy ===
Head coach: Cesare Maldini

No.	Pos.	Player	Date of birth (age)	Caps	Club
	GK	Ferro Tontini	14 August 1969 (aged 21)		(Italy) AS Roma
	GK	Paolo Di Sarno	1 June 1968 (aged 23)		(Italy) Nuova Ternana 1925
	DF	Giuseppe Favalli	8 January 1972 (aged 19)		(Italy) US Cremonese
	DF	Paolo Negro	16 April 1972 (aged 19)		(Italy) Bologna FC 1909
	DF	Stefano Rossini	2 February 1971 (aged 20)		(Italy) AC Parma
	DF	Massimiliano Tacchinardi	2 August 1971 (aged 19)		(Italy) Inter Milan
	DF	Mauro Bonomi	23 August 1972 (aged 18)		(Italy) US Cremonese
	DF	Carmine Parlato	7 June 1970 (aged 21)		(Italy) Calcio Padova
	MF	Demetrio Albertini	23 August 1971 (aged 19)		(Italy) AC Milan
	MF	Pietro Parente	9 November 1971 (aged 19)		(Italy) SSC Bari
	MF	Dario Marcolin	28 October 1971 (aged 19)		(Italy) US Cremonese
	MF	Giovanni Bonavita	21 September 1971 (aged 19)		(Italy) Atalanta BC
	MF	Massimo Lombardini	23 July 1971 (aged 19)		(Italy) US Cremonese
		Catena			(Italy)
		Mancini			(Italy)
	FW	Antonio Rizzolo	22 April 1969 (aged 22)		(Italy) Calcio Padova
	FW	Graziano Mannari	19 April 1969 (aged 22)		(Italy) AC Parma

=== Turkey ===
Head coach: Fatih Terim

No.	Pos.	Player	Date of birth (age)	Caps	Club
	GK	Kazım Konak	1 August 1969 (aged 21)		(Turkey) Gençlerbirliği
	GK	Altay Nazif Dağdelen	20 January 1970 (aged 21)		(Turkey) Manisaspor
	DF	Metin Aydemir	27 June 1969 (aged 22)		(Turkey) İnegölspor
	DF	Mutlu Topçu	16 November 1970 (aged 20)		(Turkey) Beşiktaş
	DF	Ali Günçar	19 May 1970 (aged 21)		(Turkey) Gençlerbirliği
	DF	Feti Okuroğlu	5 August 1971 (aged 19)		(Turkey) Karşıyaka
	DF	Ogün Temizkanoğlu	6 October 1969 (aged 21)		(Turkey) Trabzonspor
	DF	Serhat Güller	18 December 1968 (aged 22)		(Turkey) Ankaragücü
	DF	Kemalettin Şentürk	9 February 1970 (aged 21)		(Turkey) Çaykur Rizespor
	MF	Osman Akyol	1 September 1969 (aged 21)		(Turkey) Samsunspor
	MF	Faruk Korkmaz	14 September 1969 (aged 21)		(Turkey) Aydınspor
	MF	Ali Nail Durmuş	20 November 1970 (aged 20)		(Turkey) Bursaspor
	MF	Hamza Hamzaoğlu	15 January 1970 (aged 21)		(Turkey) İzmirspor
	MF	Tugay Kerimoğlu	24 August 1970 (aged 20)		(Turkey) Galatasaray
	MF	Cengiz Alp	25 January 1969 (aged 22)		(Turkey) Ankaragücü
	MF	Bülent Sevlü	14 December 1971 (aged 19)		(Turkey) Antalyaspor
	FW	Hakan Şükür	1 September 1971 (aged 19)		(Turkey) Bursaspor
	FW	İsmail Demirci	27 November 1968 (aged 22)		(Turkey) Çaykur Rizespor
	FW	Benhur Babaoğlu	29 March 1970 (aged 21)		(Turkey) Malatyaspor
	FW	Emin Taş	20 April 1972 (aged 19)		(Turkey) Göztepe

== Group B ==
=== Albania ===
Head coach:

No.	Pos.	Player	Date of birth (age)	Caps	Club
	GK	Blendi Nallbani	30 May 1971 (aged 20)		(Albania) KF Tirana
	DF	Gjergji Dema	7 August 1971 (aged 19)		(Albania) Flamurtari FC
	DF	Përparim Daiu	21 April 1970 (aged 21)		(Albania) KF Besa Kavajë
	MF	Arben Milori	22 November 1969 (aged 21)		(Albania) FC Dinamo City
	MF	Blendi Sokoli	9 September 1971 (aged 19)		(Albania) KF Tirana
	MF	Adrian Barbullushi	12 December 1968 (aged 22)		(Albania) KF Vllaznia
	MF	Lefter Millo	2 August 1966 (aged 24)		(Greece) AEL
	MF	Ferdinand Bilali	10 April 1969 (aged 22)		(Albania) KF Elbasani
	FW	Kliton Bozgo	5 December 1971 (aged 19)		(Albania) FK Tomori

=== Algeria ===
Head coach: Abdelmalek Laroui and Mourad Ouardi

No.	Pos.	Player	Date of birth (age)	Caps	Club
	GK	Aziz Bouras	27 April 1965 (aged 26)		
	GK	Lyès Izri			
	DF	Sid Ahmed Berrahma			(Algeria) USM Bel-Abbès
	DF	Fayçal Hamdani	13 July 1970 (aged 20)		(Algeria) MC Alger
	MF	Adel Amrouche	7 March 1968 (aged 23)		(Algeria) USM Alger
	MF	Billel Dziri	21 January 1972 (aged 19)		(Algeria) NA Hussein Dey
	MF	Mouloud Kaoua	12 May 1971 (aged 20)		(Algeria) MO Constantine
	MF	Mustapha Maza	10 July 1970 (aged 20)		(Algeria) MC Alger
	MF	Sid Ahmed Zerrouki	30 August 1970 (aged 20)		(Algeria) MC Oran
	FW	Brahim Adda	1 March 1976 (aged 15)		(Algeria) USM Bel-Abbès
	FW	Mohamed Rahem	21 June 1970 (aged 21)		(Algeria) USM El Harrach

=== Greece ===
Head coach: Giorgos Petridis

No.	Pos.	Player	Date of birth (age)	Caps	Club
	GK	Vasilios Karagiannis	27 September 1969 (aged 21)		(Greece) Diagoras
	GK	Kostas Chaniotakis	19 July 1968 (aged 22)		(Greece) OFI
	GK	Kosmas Karavas	10 September 1969 (aged 21)		(Greece) Kallithea
	DF	Antonis Gioukoudis	13 May 1969 (aged 22)		(Greece) Aris
	DF	Theofilos Karasavvidis	27 April 1971 (aged 20)		(Greece) Apollon Smyrnis
	DF	Marinos Ouzounidis	10 October 1968 (aged 22)		(Greece) Skoda Xanthi
	DF	Konstantinos Pavlopoulos	26 December 1971 (aged 19)		(Greece) Panathinaikos
	DF	Nikos Kehagias	21 April 1969 (aged 22)		(Greece) Skoda Xanthi
	MF	Petros Marinakis	16 February 1968 (aged 23)		(Greece) OFI
	MF	Ioannis Apostolou			
	MF	Georgios Donis	29 October 1969 (aged 21)		(Greece) PAS Giannina
	FW	Alexis Alexandris	21 October 1968 (aged 22)		(Greece) Veria
	FW	Panagiotis Sofianopoulos	7 July 1968 (aged 22)		(Greece) Olympiacos
	FW	Dimitrios Moutas	15 April 1968 (aged 23)		(Germany) Stuttgarter Kickers
	MF	Manolis Papadopoulos	22 April 1968 (aged 23)		(Greece) Ionikos
	DF	Emmanuel Mitsopoulos	2 April 1969 (aged 22)		(Greece) Edessaikos
	DF	Georgios Koltsidas	23 October 1970 (aged 20)		(Greece) Trikala
	DF	Nikos Kostenoglou	3 October 1970 (aged 20)		(Greece) Xanthi
	FW	Ioannis Tzortzis			(Greece) Trikala F.C.
	DF	Charalampos Kavasis	14 May 1968 (aged 23)		

== Group C ==
=== San Marino ===
Head coach: Giorgio Leoni

No.	Pos.	Player	Date of birth (age)	Caps	Goals	Club
	GK	Maurizio Conti	23 November 1969 (aged 21)			
	GK	Stefano Muccioli	19 January 1968 (aged 23)			(San Marino Football Federation) S.S. Cosmos
	DF	Luca Bizzocchi	18 July 1970 (aged 20)			(San Marino Football Federation) AC Juvenes/Dogana
	DF	Simone Della Balda	2 December 1972 (aged 18)			(San Marino Football Federation) SP Tre Penne
	DF	Luca Gobbi	12 June 1971 (aged 20)			(San Marino Football Federation) AC Juvenes/Dogana
	DF	Mauro Valentini	27 July 1973 (aged 17)			(Italian Football Federation) Rimini FC 1912
	DF	William Guerra	24 February 1968 (aged 23)			(Italian Football Federation) Real Montecchio
	MF	Nicola Bacciocchi	16 December 1971 (aged 19)			(Italian Football Federation) ASD Santarcangelo
	MF	Fabio Francini	6 March 1969 (aged 22)			(Italian Football Federation) SS Santarcangiolese
	MF	Pierangelo Mularoni	25 March 1969 (aged 22)			(San Marino Football Federation) San Marino Calcio
	MF	Simone Bianchi	7 September 1971 (aged 19)			(San Marino Football Federation) SS Folgore Falciano Calcio
	MF	Pier Domenico Della Valle	4 May 1970 (aged 21)			(San Marino Football Federation) SC Faetano
	MF	Ivan Matteoni	21 August 1971 (aged 19)			(San Marino Football Federation) San Marino Calcio
	FW	Enea Zucchi	20 May 1973 (aged 18)			
	FW	Paolo Berardi				
	FW	Mauro Moroni				

=== Yugoslavia ===
Head coach:

No.	Pos.	Player	Date of birth (age)	Caps	Club
1	GK	Zvonko Milojević	30 August 1971 (aged 19)		(Socialist Federal Republic of Yugoslavia) Red Star Belgrade
	DF	Predrag Erak	1 July 1970 (aged 20)		(Socialist Federal Republic of Yugoslavia) Hajduk Split
	DF	Gordan Petrić	30 July 1969 (aged 21)		(Socialist Federal Republic of Yugoslavia) Partizan Belgrade
	DF	Bratislav Mijalković	10 September 1971 (aged 19)		(Socialist Federal Republic of Yugoslavia) Partizan Belgrade
	DF	Vejsil Varupa	25 January 1971 (aged 20)		(Socialist Federal Republic of Yugoslavia) Sarajevo
		Bogdanović			(Socialist Federal Republic of Yugoslavia)
		Šandalić			(Socialist Federal Republic of Yugoslavia)
	FW	Anto Drobnjak	21 September 1968 (aged 22)		(Socialist Federal Republic of Yugoslavia) Budućnost Titograd
	DF	Niša Saveljić	27 March 1970 (aged 21)		(Socialist Federal Republic of Yugoslavia) Budućnost Titograd
	MF	Džoni Novak	4 September 1969 (aged 21)		(Socialist Federal Republic of Yugoslavia) Partizan Belgrade
	MF	Slaviša Jokanović	16 August 1968 (aged 22)		(Socialist Federal Republic of Yugoslavia) Partizan Belgrade
	MF	Bratislav Živković	28 November 1970 (aged 20)		(Socialist Federal Republic of Yugoslavia) Vojvodina
	FW	Ivica Vukov	2 February 1970 (aged 21)		(Socialist Federal Republic of Yugoslavia) Vojvodina
	MF	Mario Stanić	10 April 1972 (aged 19)		(Socialist Federal Republic of Yugoslavia) Željezničar Sarajevo

== Group D ==
=== Cyprus ===
Head coach:

No.	Pos.	Player	Date of birth (age)	Caps	Club
	GK	Nikos Panagiotou	16 December 1970 (aged 20)		(Cyprus) Anorthosis Famagusta
		Aristidou			(Cyprus)
		Konstantinou			(Cyprus)
	DF	Georgios Christodoulou	22 August 1965 (aged 25)		(Greece) Olympiacos
	DF	Stavros Georgiou	14 September 1972 (aged 18)		(Cyprus) Apollon Limassol
	DF	Zacharias Charalampous	25 March 1971 (aged 20)		(Cyprus) Anorthosis Famagusta
	DF	Kostakis Konstantinou	24 September 1968 (aged 22)		(Cyprus) AEL Limassol
	MF	Antonis Antoniou			(Cyprus)
	MF	Giorgos Savvidis	8 February 1961 (aged 30)		(Cyprus) AEK Athens
		Karagiannis			(Cyprus)
	FW	Andreas Sotiriou	7 June 1968 (aged 23)		(Cyprus) APOEL
		Christofi			(Cyprus)
	FW	Aristos Aristokleous	28 February 1974 (aged 17)		(Cyprus) APOEL

=== Morocco ===
Head coach: (Germany) Werner Olk

No.	Pos.	Player	Date of birth (age)	Caps	Club
	GK	Mustapha Achab	29 September 1969 (aged 21)		(Morocco) Wydad Casablanca
	GK	Mustapha Toutia			(Morocco) Raja Casablanca
	DF	Abdelkrim El Hadrioui	6 March 1972 (aged 19)		(Morocco) FAR Rabat
	DF	Noureddine Naybet	10 February 1970 (aged 21)		(Morocco) Wydad Casablanca
	DF	Mohcene Bouhlal	22 April 1970 (aged 21)		(Morocco) FAR Rabat
	DF	Mouloud Moudakkar	5 March 1970 (aged 21)		(Morocco) US Sidi Kacem
	DF	Samir Belhouji			(Morocco) MAS Fez
	DF	Lahcen Abrami	31 December 1969 (aged 21)		(Morocco) Wydad Casablanca
	DF	Rachid Daoudi	2 August 1970 (aged 20)		(Morocco) Kawkab Marrakech
	MF	Khalid Raghib	22 September 1969 (aged 21)		(Morocco) RS Settat
	MF	Hicham Dmii	11 January 1971 (aged 20)		(Morocco) Kawkab Marrakech
	MF	Said Rokbi	20 October 1969 (aged 21)		(Morocco) RS Settat
	MF	Zakaria Rmouj			
	MF	Tahar El Khalej	16 June 1968 (aged 23)		(Morocco) Kawkab Marrakech
	MF	Mohamed Sabek			(Morocco) IR Tanger
	MF	Saïd Chiba	28 September 1970 (aged 20)		(Morocco) FUS Rabat
	MF	Aziz Azim	5 March 1970 (aged 21)		(Morocco) US Sidi Kacem
	FW	Mohamed Samadi	21 March 1970 (aged 21)		(Morocco) FAR Rabat
	FW	Hussein Amotta	24 October 1969 (aged 21)		(Morocco) FUS Rabat
		Abdelaziz Bouanani			
