= 2001–02 Al Ain FC season =

Al Ain FC's season overview

Al Ain
2001–02 season
- President: Mohammed Bin Zayed
- Manager: Anghel Iordănescu (from 13 March 2001 until 4 January 2002); Ahmed Abdullah* (from 6 January 2002 until 8 January 2002); Džemal Hadžiabdić (from 8 January 2002 until 15 June 2002)
- UAE Football League: 1st
- President's Cup: Semi-finals
- Federation Cup: Group stage
- UAE Super Cup: Runner-ups
- Asian Cup Winners' Cup: Quarter-finals
- Arab Club Champions Cup: Withdrew
- Top goalscorer: League: Arthur Moses (12); All: Joël Tiéhi (19)
Home colours	Away colours
- All statistics correct as of 7 June 2002.

The 2001–02 season was Al Ain Football Club's 34th in existence and the club's 27th consecutive season in the top-level football league in the UAE.

== Club ==
=== Technical staff ===
Position	Name
Head coach	(Romania) Anghel Iordănescu
Assistant coach	(United Arab Emirates) Ahmed Abdullah
U-21 team head coach	(Tunisia) Mohammad El Mansi
Team Manager	(United Arab Emirates) Matar Obaid Al Sahbani
First team supervisor	(United Arab Emirates) Hamad Nakhirat Al Ameri

== Players ==
=== First Team ===
Pos.	Name
GK	(United Arab Emirates) Waleed Salim
GK	(United Arab Emirates) Zakria Ahmed
	(United Arab Emirates) Talal Mustafa
DF	(United Arab Emirates) Juma Khater
DF	(United Arab Emirates) Mohammed Hamdoon
FW	(United Arab Emirates) Fahad Al Nowais
MF	(United Arab Emirates) Salem Joher
DF	(United Arab Emirates) Salem Ali
DF	(United Arab Emirates) Abdullah Ali
MF	(United Arab Emirates) Rami Yaslam
FW	(United Arab Emirates) Faisal Ali
MF	(United Arab Emirates) Omar Gharib
DF	(United Arab Emirates) Hassan Abdullah
FW	(United Arab Emirates) Salem Muftah
MF	(Morocco) Rachid Daoudi
	(United Arab Emirates) Mohammed Saeed
MF	(United Arab Emirates) Helal Saeed
	(United Arab Emirates) Youssef Hareb
FW	(Ivory Coast) Joël Tiéhi
	(United Arab Emirates) Ahmed saeed
DF	(United Arab Emirates) Ali Msarri
	(United Arab Emirates) Musabbah Salem
	(United Arab Emirates) Eisa Saeed
	(United Arab Emirates) Hamad Saeed
	(United Arab Emirates) Bader Musabbah

== Competitions ==
=== Overview ===
Competition	First match	Last match	Starting round	Final position	Record							
Competition	First match	Last match	Starting round	Final position	Pld	W	D	L	GF	GA	GD	Win %
Football League	15 November 2001	12 May 2002	Matchday 1	Winners	22	14	5	3	44	23	+21	63.64
President's Cup	8 January 2002	7 June 2002	Group stage	Semi-finals	9	8	0	1	34	6	+28	88.89
Federation Cup	13 September 2001	1 November 2001	Group stage	Group stage	10	5	2	3	14	10	+4	50.00
UAE Super Cup	19 May 2002	24 May 2002	Semi-finals	Runners-up	2	1	0	1	2	2	+0	50.00
Asian Cup Winners' Cup	21 December 2001	22 February 2002	First round	Quarter-finals	5	3	0	2	5	4	+1	60.00
Total					48	31	7	10	99	45	+54	64.58

Last updated: 7 June 2002
Source: Competitions

=== UAE Football League ===
==== League table ====
Pos	Team	Pld	W	D	L	GF	GA	GD	Pts
1	Al Ain	22	14	5	3	44	23	+21	47
2	Al Jazira	22	11	5	6	50	33	+17	38
3	Al-Shaab	22	9	10	3	40	26	+14	37
4	Al Wahda	22	10	6	6	55	38	+17	36
5	Al Ahli	22	8	6	8	42	35	+7	30

Source: rsssf.org

==== Matches ====
15 November 2001 1	Ittihad Kalba	0–2	Al Ain	Kalba
		Report	Tiéhi 6', 49'	Stadium: Ittihad Kalba Stadium; Referee: Musallam Ahmad

18 November 2001 2	Al Ain	3–1	Al Shabab	Al Ain
	G. Harib 10'; A. Ali 35'; Fahad .A 45'	Report	W. Obaid 80'	Stadium: Tahnoun bin Mohammed; Referee: Ali Bujsaim

22 November 2001 3	Al Shaab	3–1	Al Ain	Sharjah
	A. Ibrahim 28'; S. Ibraheem 52'; Abu Al-Hail 67'	Report	G. Harib 61'	Stadium: Khalid bin Mohammed Stadium; Referee: Fareed Al-Marzouqi

28 November 2001 4	Al Ain	3–1	Baniyas	Al Ain
	S. Khater 51'; Tiéhi 60'	Report	Ghazi 17' (pen.)	Stadium: Tahnoun bin Mohammed

5 December 2001 5	Al Nasr	0–0	Al Ain	Dubai
		Report		Stadium: Al Maktoum Stadium; Referee: Fareed Al-Marzouqi

27 December 2001 7	Al Khaleej	0–2	Al Ain	Khor Fakkan
		Report	Ebiede 13', 81'

4 February 2002 8	Al Ain	2–1	Al Ahli	Al Ain
	Moses 34', 44'		F. Khalil 85' (pen.)	Stadium: Tahnoun bin Mohammed

28 February 2002 11	Al Wasl	1–0	Al Ain	Dubai
	Montecinos 86' (pen.)	Report		Stadium: Zabeel Stadium

5 March 2002 6	Al Ain	3–1	Al Wahda	Al Ain
	Moses 45', 47'; S. Rashed 59'	Report	S. Khamees 71'	Stadium: Tahnoun bin Mohammed; Referee: Ali Bujsaim

10 March 2002 9	Sharjah	3–3 Abandoned	Al Ain	Sharjah
	Farhan 19', 35'; Al Kass 38'	Report	M. Omar 62'; H. Saeed 83'; Tiéhi 90'	Stadium: Sharjah Stadium; Referee: Ahmed Khamis

15 March 2002 10	Al Ain	0–1	Al Jazira	Al Ain
		Report	Suhail 87'	Stadium: Tahnoun bin Mohammed

19 March 2002 Replay	Sharjah	2–2	Al Ain	Dubai
	Al-Dokhi 30'; El Assas 35'	Report	Tiéhi 83'; Moses 86'	Stadium: Maktoum bin Rashid Al Maktoum; Referee: Mohamed Omar

29 March 2002 14	Al Ain	2–2	Al Shaab	Al Ain
	Moses 1', 55'	Report	A. Ibrahim 25'; S. Yousif 60'	Stadium: Tahnoun bin Mohammed; Referee: Fareed Al-Marzouqi

4 April 2002 15	Baniyas	0–1	Al Ain	Abu Dhabi
		Report	Tiéhi 52'	Referee: Ahmed Khamis

8 April 2002 13	Al Shabab	1–2	Al Ain	Dubai
	Denílson 64' (pen.)	Report	M. Omar 62'; H. Saeed 73'	Stadium: Maktoum bin Rashid Al Maktoum

11 April 2002 16	Al Ain	3–1	Al Nasr	Al Ain
	Moses 1', 62'; M. Omar 38'	Report	Kanzari 47' (pen.)	Stadium: Tahnoun bin Mohammed; Referee: Mohamed Omar

16 April 2002 17	Al Wahda	2–3	Al Ain	Abu Dhabi
	Al-Enazi 27'; F. Masoud 58'	Report	A. Ali 35'; Moses 37'; M. Omar 80' (pen.)	Stadium: Al Nahyan Stadium; Referee: Mohamed Omar

19 April 2002 18	Al Ain	3–2	Al Khaleej	Al Ain
	A. Ali 12'; Tiéhi 86'	Report	Faye 25'; Nawaf .M 33'	Stadium: Tahnoun bin Mohammed

25 April 2002 19	Al Ahli	0–0	Al Ain	Dubai
		Report		Stadium: Rashid Stadium

29 April 2002 12	Al Ain	2–1	Ittihad Kalba	Al Ain
	S. Rashed 80', 82'	Report	Zolo 75' (pen.)	Stadium: Tahnoun bin Mohammed; Referee: Salah Amen

2 May 2002 20	Al Ain	5–1	Sharjah	Al Ain
	Moses 34'; M. Omar 47', 50'; Shehab .A 58'	Report	El Assas 91'	Stadium: Tahnoun bin Mohammed; Referee: Mohamed Al-Zarouni

8 May 2002 21	Al Jazira	2–2	Al Ain	Abu Dhabi
	Debbah 31'; M. Salem 69'	Report	Moses 2'; A. Ali 28'	Stadium: Al Jazira Stadium; Referee: Mohamed Omar

12 May 2002 22	Al Ain	3–0	Al Wasl	Al Ain
	Tiéhi 34'; M. Omar 68'; S. Khater 86'	Report		Stadium: Tahnoun bin Mohammed; Referee: Musallam Ahmad

=== UAE President's Cup ===
==== Group D ====
Team	Pld	W	D	L	GF	GA	GD	Pts
Al Ain	6	6	0	0	27	1	+26	18
Al Khaleej	6	4	1	1	12	7	+5	13
Al Shaab	6	3	0	3	14	14	0	9
Ahli Al Fujairah	6	2	1	3	13	13	0	7
Al Urooba	6	2	1	3	9	11	−2	7
Dibba	6	1	1	4	3	15	−12	4
Al Jazirah Al Hamra	6	1	0	5	7	24	−17	3

Source: rsssf.org

8 January 2002 2	Al Ain	3–0	Dibba	Al Ain
	Ebiede 8', 45'; Tiéhi 40'	Report		Stadium: Tahnoun bin Mohammed

14 January 2002 1	Al Urooba	0–6	Al Ain	Fujairah
	Ebiede 11', 43', 59', 62'; R. Yaslam 31'			Stadium: Al Urooba Club Stadium

18 January 2002 3	Al Khaleej	1–3	Al Ain	Khor Fakkan
	El Badraoui 19' (pen.)	Report	Tiéhi 44'; R. Yaslam 46'; H. Saeed 76'

21 January 2002 4	Al Ain	6–0	Al Jazirah Al Hamra	Al Ain
	R. Yaslam 1'; Tiéhi 23', 31', 47'; Muftah 80', 87'	Report		Stadium: Tahnoun bin Mohammed

26 January 2002 5	Ahli Al Fujairah	0–3	Al Ain	Fujairah
		Report	H. Abdullah 18'; Muftah 86'	Stadium: Fujairah Stadium; Referee: Abdullah Al Bannai

30 January 2002 6	Al Ain	6–0	Al Shaab	Al Ain
	R. Yaslam 27', 70'; Tiéhi 33' (pen.); Shehab .A 67'; Moses 80', 86'			Stadium: Tahnoun bin Mohammed

30 May 2002 Round of 16	Al Ain	2–1	Al Shabab	Abu Dhabi
	Fahad .A 67', 86'	Report	W. Obaid 19'	Stadium: Al Jazira Stadium

3 June 2002 Quarter-finals	Al Dhafra	1–3	Al Ain	Abu Dhabi
	Ereyahi 73'	Report	M. Omar 13'; S. Khater 58'; F. Ali 88'	Stadium: Al Jazira Stadium

7 June 2002 Semi-finals	Al Jazira	3–2	Al Ain	Abu Dhabi
	Weah 30', 95'; Qassim .M 92'	Report	M. Omar 28'; Fakher 54'	Stadium: Al Nahyan Stadium

=== UAE Super Cup ===
19 May 2002 Semi-finals	Al Ain	2–1	Al Shaab	Abu Dhabi
	A. Ali 49'	Report	A. Ibrahim 61'	Stadium: Al Nahyan Stadium; Referee: Ali Bujsaim

24 May 2002 Final	Al Wahda	1–0	Al Ain	Dubai
	Conteh 4'	Report		Stadium: Al Maktoum Stadium; Referee: Mohamed Al-Zarouni

=== UAE Federation Cup ===
==== Group B ====
Team	Pld	W	D	L	GF	GA	GD	Pts
Al Nasr	10	7	3	0	34	15	+19	24
Al Ahli	10	5	3	2	20	18	+2	18
Al Ain	10	5	2	3	14	10	+4	17
Al Shabab	10	3	3	4	17	18	−1	12
Ittihad Kalba	10	1	4	5	12	17	−5	7
Al Khaleej	10	1	1	8	9	28	−19	4

Source: rsssf.org

13 September 2001 1	Al Ain	0–2; Awarded (Note: The Al Ain v Al Ahli first leg, originally won 3–0 by Al Ain, was forfeited and awarded 2–0 to Al Ahli by the UAE FA Competitions Committee on 16 September 2001, as Al Ain fielded the player Salim Ali, whose FA registration card was not renewed by the club.)	Al Ahli	Al Ain
	Tiéhi 5', 68'; F. Ali 38'	Report		Stadium: Tahnoun bin Mohammed; Referee: Musallam Ahmad

17 September 2001 2	Al Ain	1–0	Al Khaleej	Al Ain
	Muftah 71'	Report		Stadium: Tahnoun bin Mohammed; Referee: Ali Al-Badwawi

20 September 2001 3	Al Ain	1–1	Al Shabab	Al Ain
	Tiéhi 52' (pen.)	Report	Denílson 72'	Stadium: Tahnoun bin Mohammed; Referee: Ahmed Khamis

26 September 2001 4	Al Ain	1–1	Al Nasr	Al Ain
	Tiéhi 14'	Report	Kadem .A 64'	Stadium: Tahnoun bin Mohammed; Referee: Mohamed Al-Zarouni

3 October 2001 5	Ittihad Kalba	1–2	Al Ain	Kalba
	A. Mohamed 73' (pen.)	Report	Tiéhi 5' (pen.); F. Ali 64'	Stadium: Ittihad Kalba Stadium; Referee: Waleed Ali

7 October 2001 6	Al Ahli	1–0	Al Ain	Dubai
	Shah 31'	Report		Stadium: Rashid Stadium; Referee: Ali Bujsaim

11 October 2001 7	Al Khaleej	1–5	Al Ain	Khor Fakkan
	Nawaf .M 89'	Report	F. Ali 52'; Ebiede 59'; Tiéhi 61'; H. Saeed 76'; A. Musabbah 81'	Referee: Ali Al Mulla

17 October 2001 8	Al Shabab	0–1	Al Ain	Dubai
		Report	Tiéhi 71'	Stadium: Maktoum bin Rashid Al Maktoum; Referee: Abdullah Al Bannai

24 October 2001 9	Al Nasr	3–1	Al Ain	Dubai
	Mosalam .A 39'; Kadem .A 60'; da Silva 87'	Report	H. Saeed 82' (pen.)	Stadium: Al Maktoum Stadium; Referee: Mohamed Omar

1 November 2001 10	Al Ain	2–0	Ittihad Kalba	Al Ain
	F. Ali 26'; Tiéhi 76'	Report		Stadium: Tahnoun bin Mohammed; Referee: Ali Al Mulla

=== Asian Cup Winners' Cup ===
==== First round ====
Al Ain (United Arab Emirates)	w/o (Note: Al Salmiya withdrew.)	(Kuwait) Al Salmiya

==== Second round ====
21 December 2001 First leg	Al Wahdat (Jordan)	2–1	(United Arab Emirates) Al Ain	Amman
	Deeb 50'; Maali 64'		Moses 13'	Stadium: King Abdullah II Stadium; Referee: Mahmoud Al Rifai (Syria)

4 January 2002 Second leg	Al Ain (United Arab Emirates)	2–0 (3–2 agg.)	(Jordan) Al Wahdat	Al Ain
	Moses 24'; G. Harib 72'	Report		Stadium: Tahnoun bin Mohammed; Referee: Sabah Qasim (Iraq)

==== Quarter-finals ====
15 February 2002 First leg	Al Sadd (Qatar)	1–0	(United Arab Emirates) Al Ain	Doha
	Utaka 28'	Report		Stadium: Jassim bin Hamad Stadium

22 February 2002 Second leg	Al Ain (United Arab Emirates)	2–1 (2–2a agg.)	(Qatar) Al Sadd	Al Ain
	Moses 36', 75'	Report	El Moubarki 35'	Stadium: Tahnoun bin Mohammed; Attendance: 10,000; Referee: Qassem Shaaban (Kuwait)

== Statistics ==
=== Goalscorers ===
As of 7 June 2002

Includes all competitive matches. The list is sorted alphabetically by surname when total goals are equal.

Rank	Pos.	Player	Football League	President's Cup	Federation Cup	UAE Super Cup	Asian Cup Winners' Cup	Total
1	FW	(Ivory Coast) Joël Tiéhi	7	6	6	0	0	19
2	FW	(Ghana) Arthur Moses	12	2	0	0	4	18
3	MF	(Nigeria) Emmanuel Ebiede	2	6	1	0	0	9
4	FW	(United Arab Emirates) Mohammad Omar	6	2	0	0	0	8
5	MF	(United Arab Emirates) Salem Johar	3	2	0	1	0	6
6	DF	(United Arab Emirates) Abdullah Ali	4	0	0	1	0	5
6	MF	(United Arab Emirates) Rami Yaslam	0	5	0	0	0	5
8	MF	(United Arab Emirates) Helal Saeed	1	1	2	0	0	4
8	FW	(United Arab Emirates) Faisal Ali	0	1	3	0	0	4
8	FW	(United Arab Emirates) Salem Muftah	0	3	1	0	0	4
11	MF	(United Arab Emirates) Gharib Harib	2	0	0	0	1	3
11	MF	(United Arab Emirates) Subait Khater	2	1	0	0	0	3
11	MF	(United Arab Emirates) Sultan Rashed	3	0	0	0	0	3
11	DF	(United Arab Emirates) Fahad Ali	1	2	0	0	0	3
15	MF	(United Arab Emirates) Shehab Ahmed	1	1	0	0	0	2
16	DF	(United Arab Emirates) Humaid Fakher	0	1	0	0	0	1
16	DF	(United Arab Emirates) Hassan Abdullah	0	1	0	0	0	1
16	MF	(United Arab Emirates) Abdullah Musabbah	0	0	1	0	0	1
Own goals (from the opponents)			0	0	0	0	0	0
Totals			44	34	14	2	5	99
