= Marecos (surname) =

Marecos is a surname. Notable people with the surname include:

- Elvis Marecos (born 1980), Paraguayan footballer
- Héctor Marecos (born 1979), Paraguayan footballer and manager
- Juan Marecos (born 1969), Paraguayan footballer

== See also ==
- Mareco
