= 2001–02 UAE Football League =

UAE Football League
- Season: 2001–02
- Champions: Al Ain
- Relegated: Al Khaleej; Baniyas
- AFC Champions League: Al Ain; Al Ahli
- Matches: 132
- Goals: 466 (3.53 per match)
- Top goalscorer: Mohammed Salem Al-Enazi (22 goals)

Statistics of UAE Football League for the 2001–02 season.

== Overview ==
It was contested by 12 teams, and Al Ain won the championship.

== Personnel ==
Team	Head coach
Al Ahli	(Romania) Florin Motroc
Al Ain	(Bosnia and Herzegovina) Džemal Hadžiabdić
Al Jazira	(Netherlands) Jan Versleijen
Al Khaleej	(Germany) Egon Coordes
Al-Nasr	
Al-Shaab	(Germany) Reiner Hollmann
Al Shabab	(Romania) Grigore Sichitiu
Al Wahda	(Netherlands) Jo Bonfrère
Al Wasl	(Uruguay) Martín Lasarte
Baniyas	(Germany) Rainer Zobel
Ittihad Kalba	
Sharjah	(Federal Republic of Yugoslavia) Dragan Gugleta

== Foreign players ==
Club	Player 1	Player 2	Player 3	Former players
Al Ahli	(Iran) Ali Karimi	(Morocco) Rachid Benmahmoud	(Tunisia) Sirajeddine Chihi	(Morocco) Rabii Laafoui
Al Ain	(Ghana) Arthur Moses	(Ivory Coast) Abdul Kader Keïta	(Ivory Coast) Joël Tiéhi	
Al Jazira	(Liberia) George Weah	(Liberia) James Debbah	(Nigeria) Emmanuel Ebiede	(Ivory Coast) Charles Dago
Al Khaleej	(Morocco) Mohamed El Badraoui			
Al-Nasr	(Iran) Sattar Hamedani	(Morocco) Ahmed Bahja	(Tunisia) Maher Kanzari	
Al-Shaab	(Iraq) Abdul Wahab Abu Al-Hail	(Morocco) Reda Ereyahi		
Al Shabab	(Brazil) Denílson	(Cameroon) Guy Mamoun		(Chile) Marcelo Corrales
Al Wahda	(Qatar) Mohammed Salem Al-Enazi	(South Africa) Phil Masinga	(Tunisia) Faouzi Rouissi	(Sierra Leone) Lamin Conteh
Al Wasl	(Chile) Cristián Montecinos	(Iran) Farhad Majidi	(Nigeria) Ganiyu Owolabi	
Baniyas	(Burkina Faso) Abdoulaye Traoré	(Burkina Faso) Brahima Korbeogo	(Sudan) James Moga	(Algeria) Farid Ghazi
Ittihad Kalba	(Iran) Ali Baghmisheh	(Iraq) Qahtan Chathir		
Sharjah	(Bahrain) Rashid Al-Dosari	(Iraq) Razzaq Farhan	(Morocco) Hussein Ammouta	(Tunisia) Mourad Chebbi

== League standings ==
Pos	Team	Pld	W	D	L	GF	GA	GD	Pts
1	Al Ain	22	14	5	3	44	23	+21	47
2	Al Jazira	22	11	5	6	50	33	+17	38
3	Al-Shaab	22	9	10	3	40	26	+14	37
4	Al Wahda	22	10	6	6	55	38	+17	36
5	Al Ahli	22	8	6	8	42	35	+7	30
6	Al Wasl	22	7	9	6	34	31	+3	30
7	Sharjah	22	6	10	6	44	44	0	28
8	Al-Nasr	22	6	10	6	43	43	0	28
9	Ittihad Kalba	22	8	2	12	28	36	−8	26
10	Al Shabab	22	3	10	9	29	39	−10	19
11	Al Khaleej	22	3	9	10	35	61	−26	18
12	Baniyas	22	4	4	14	22	57	−35	16

Source: rsssf.org
