= Ali Günçar =

Turkish footballer (born 1970)

Personal information
- Date of birth: 19 May 1970 (age 56)
- Place of birth: Afyonkarahisar
- Position: Defender

Senior career*
| Years | Team | Apps | (Gls) |
| 1987–1990 | Yeni Afyonspor | | |
| 1990–1992 | Gençlerbirliği | | |
| 1992–1997 | Beşiktaş | | |
| 1998 | Samsunspor | | |
| 1998–2001 | Adanaspor | | |

International career
| 1992–2001 | Turkey | 7 | (0) |
- * Club domestic league appearances and goals

Ali Günçar (born 19 May 1970) is a retired Turkish football defender.

He was also a squad member at the 1991 Mediterranean Games
