= Ali Nail Durmuş =

Turkish footballer and manager

Personal information
- Date of birth: 20 November 1970 (age 55)
- Place of birth: Akyazı
- Position: Midfielder

Senior career*
Years	Team	Apps	(Gls)
1987–1994	Bursaspor		
1994–1998	Fenerbahçe		
1995–1996	→ Vanspor (loan)		
1996–1997	→ Zeytinburnuspor (loan)		
1998–2000	Göztepe Izmir		
2000–2002	MKE Kırıkkalespor		
2002–2003	Tekirdağspor		
2003–2004	Kahramanmaraşspor		

International career
1991	Turkey Olympic	1	(0)

Managerial career
- 2004–2005: Kütahyaspor
- 2005–2006: Iğdırspor
- 2006–2007: Darıca Gençlerbirliği
- 2007–2008: Bucaspor
- 2008: Aksarayspor
- 2008: Zeytinburnuspor
- 2012–2013: Gebzespor
- 2014: Tavşanlı Linyitspor
- 2015: Tavşanlı Linyitspor
- * Club domestic league appearances and goals

Ali Nail Durmuş (born 20 November 1970) is a retired Turkish football midfielder and later manager.

He was a squad member for the 1991 Mediterranean Games.
