= Giorgio Leoni =

Sammarinese football manager

Personal information
- Date of birth: 4 September 1950 (age 76)
- Place of birth: San Marino

Managerial career
- Years: Team
- 1990–1995: San Marino

Giorgio Leoni (born 4 September 1950) is a Sammarinese professional football manager.

== Career ==
Between 1990 and 1995 he was a head coach of the San Marino national football team.
