= Lee Seung-hyeop =

South Korean footballer (born 1971)

Personal information
- Date of birth: 15 April 1971 (age 55)
- Height: 1.80 m (5 ft 11 in)
- Position: Defender

College career
Years	Team	Apps	(Gls)
1990–1993	Yonsei University		

Senior career*
Years	Team	Apps	(Gls)
1994–1998	Pohang Steelers	21	(0)

International career
1990–1992	South Korea U23		
- * Club domestic league appearances and goals

Lee Seung-hyeop (born 15 April 1971) is a South Korean footballer. He is played for Pohang Steelers. He was also part of the South Korea squad at the 1992 Olympics tournament.
