= Mareco =

Mareco is a surname. Notable people with the surname include:

- Juan Carlos Mareco (1926–2009), Uruguayan actor
- Sandro Mareco (born 1987), Argentine chess grandmaster
- Víctor Mareco (born 1984), Paraguayan footballer

== See also ==
- Mareco Broadcasting Network, a radio network in the Philippines
- Marecos
