= Mouloud Moudakkar =

Moroccan footballer

Personal information
- Date of birth: 5 March 1972 (age 54)
- Position: Midfielder

International career
Years	Team	Apps	(Gls)
- Morocco

Mouloud Moudakkar (born 5 March 1972) is a Moroccan former footballer. He competed in the 1992 Summer Olympics.
