= Mustapha Achab =

Moroccan footballer (born 1969)

Personal information
- Date of birth: 29 September 1969 (age 57)
- Place of birth: Casablanca, Morocco
- Position: Goalkeeper

Youth career
- –1990: Wydad Casablanca

Senior career*
Years	Team	Apps	(Gls)
1987–1999	Wydad Casablanca		

International career
1992	Morocco U23	3	(0)
1996	Morocco	1	(0)
- * Club domestic league appearances and goals

Mustapha Achab (born 29 September 1969) is a Moroccan footballer. He competed in the 1992 Summer Olympics.
