= Viktor Guz =

Russian footballer (1971–2023)

Personal information
- Full name: Viktor Aleksandrovich Guz
- Date of birth: 16 January 1971
- Place of birth: Prokhladny, Kabardino-Balkarian ASSR, Russian SFSR, USSR
- Date of death: 9 October 2023 (aged 52)
- Height: 1.94 m (6 ft 4 in)
- Position: Goalkeeper

Youth career
- DYuSSh-2 Smena Prokhladny
- ShISP Volgograd

Senior career*
Years	Team	Apps	(Gls)
1988	Torpedo Volzhsky	8	(0)
1988	Rotor Volgograd	0	(0)
1989	Torpedo Volzhsky	0	(0)
1989–1990	Rotor Volgograd	5	(0)
1991–1998	Torpedo Volzhsky	194	(0)
1999	Volgar-Gazprom Astrakhan	11	(0)
2000	Gazovik Orenburg	29	(0)
2001	Dostyk Shymkent	16	(0)
2001–2002	Aktobe	25	(0)
2003	Kosmos Yegoryevsk	5	(0)
2003	Zhetysu Taldykorgan	11	(0)

Managerial career
- 2005: Saturn Moscow Oblast (reserves assistant)
- 2006–2007: Saturn Moscow Oblast (reserves GK coach)
- 2008: Saturn Moscow Oblast (GK coach)
- 2008: Zhemchuzhina-Sochi
- 2009–2010: Zhemchuzhina-Sochi (assistant)
- 2011: Tyumen (assistant)
- 2012: Spartak Nalchik (GK coach)
- 2012: Torpedo Moscow (GK coach)
- 2013: Energiya Volzhsky (assistant)
- 2013: Olimpia Volgograd (assistant)
- 2013–2014: Tom Tomsk (GK coach)
- 2014–2015: Tom-2 Tomsk (assistant)
- * Club domestic league appearances and goals

Viktor Aleksandrovich Guz (Russian: Виктор Александрович Гузь; 16 January 1971 – 9 October 2023) was a Russian professional football player and coach.

== Career ==
Guz made five appearances over two seasons in the Soviet Top League for Rotor Volgograd.

Guz played six seasons in the Russian Football National League for Torpedo Volzhsky and Volgar-Gazprom Astrakhan.

== Death ==
Guz died on 9 October 2023, at the age of 52.
