= Nisse Andersson =

Swedish football coach (born 1941)

Personal information
- Date of birth: 28 August 1941 (age 85)

Managerial career
- Years: Team
- 1987: AIK
- 1987–1990: Sweden U21
- 1990–1992: Sweden national team

Nils "Nisse" Andersson (born 28 August 1941) is a Swedish former football manager. Nisse became the football manager of AIK Fotboll team in 1987. He too served as the manager of Sweden U21 team from 1987 to 1990. In 1990, he took charge as the interim manager of the Sweden national team for the rest of the year. In 1991 Tommy Svensson took charge. Andersson and also played for key role as a coach of Sweden at the 1992 Summer Olympics, where the national team finished in fifth place.
