= José Teixeira (football manager) =

Brazilian football manager

Personal information
- Full name: José de Souza Teixeira
- Date of birth: 25 September 1935
- Place of birth: São Paulo, Brazil
- Date of death: 13 April 2018 (aged 82)
- Place of death: São Paulo, Brazil

Managerial career
- Years: Team
- 1964: Barretos
- 1965–1971: Corinthians Reserves
- 1966: Corinthians (interim)
- 1971: Noroeste
- 1973–1974: Brazil Amateur
- 1974: Brazil U20
- 1978–1979: Corinthians
- 1979: Brazil (assistant)
- 1980–1981: Millonarios
- 1982: Guarani
- 1983: Al-Nassr
- 1984–1985: Al Shabab
- 1986–1987: Universitario
- 1987–1988: Brazil U17
- 1989–1990: Ituano
- 1990: Inter de Limeira
- 1991: Novorizontino
- 1992: Tokyo Gas
- 1993: Coritiba
- 1994–1996: Novorizontino
- 1996: Santos
- 1997: Bragantino
- 2006: Brazil Women

José de Souza Teixeira (25 September 1935 – 13 April 2018), known as José Teixeira, was a Brazilian football manager.
