= Abdullah Basheer Al-Abdullah =

Qatari footballer (born 1971)

Personal information
- Date of birth: 17 September 1971 (age 55)

Senior career*
Years	Team	Apps	(Gls)
- Al Sadd

International career
- Qatar
- * Club domestic league appearances and goals

Abdullah Basheer Al-Abdullah (born 17 September 1971) is a Qatari footballer. He competed in the men's tournament at the 1992 Summer Olympics.
