= Franck Soler =

French footballer (born 1970)

Personal information
- Date of birth: 3 October 1970 (age 56)
- Place of birth: Aulnay-sous-Bois
- Position: Forward

Senior career*
Years	Team	Apps	(Gls)
1986–1995	AJ Auxerre		
1995–1996	FC Martigues		
1997–2000	Paris FC		
2000–2001	Gazélec Ajaccio		
2001–2002	Racing 92		
- * Club domestic league appearances and goals

Franck Soler (born 3 October 1970) is a retired French football striker.
