= Ricardo Sanabria =

Paraguayan footballer (born 1969)

Personal information
- Full name: Ricardo Sanabria Acuña
- Date of birth: 31 October 1969 (age 56)
- Place of birth: San Lorenzo, Paraguay
- Height: 1.83 m (6 ft 0 in)
- Position: Central defender

International career
Years	Team	Apps	(Gls)
1992	Paraguay U23		
1993	Paraguay	1	(0)

Ricardo Sanabria Acuña (born 31 October 1969) is a former Paraguay international footballer who played as a defender. He played professional football in Paraguay, Argentina, Brazil and Spain during his career.

Sanabria obtained his only cap for the Paraguay national football team on 15 August 1993 in a World Cup qualifying match against Peru (2-1 win), substituting Luis Alberto Monzón in the 83rd minute. He represented Paraguay at the 1992 Summer Olympics in Barcelona, Spain.
