= Abdoulaye Koné =

Ivorian footballer (born 2006)

Abdoulayé Kone
Personal information
- Date of birth: 1 February 2006 (age 20)
- Place of birth: Cote d'Ivoire
- Height: 1.94 m (6 ft 4 in)
- Position: Centre-forward

Team information
- Current team: Westerlo

Senior career*
Years	Team	Apps	(Gls)
2025–2026	AC Oulu	10	(2)
2025	→ SalPa (loan)	3	(0)
2026	→ OLS (loan)	11	(3)
2026–	Westerlo	0	(0)
- * Club domestic league appearances and goals as of 30 August 2026

Abdoulaye Koné (born 1 February 2006) is an Ivorian professional footballer who plays as a centre forward for Belgian Pro League club Westerlo.

== Club career ==
Koné started his professional career when he moved to Finland and signed with Veikkausliiga club AC Oulu in July 2025. On 18 June 2026, Koné scored his first Veikkausliiga goal by winning goal in a 2–1 home win against IFK Mariehamn. On 2 August, he scored his second goal in the league by winning goal in a 1–0 home win over Ilves.

On 2 September 2026, Koné joined Belgian Pro League club KVC Westerlo on a four-year deal, for a transfer fee of around €300,000–400,000.

== Career statistics ==
As of 30 August 2026

Appearances and goals by club, season and competition
Club	Season	League			National cup (Note: Includes Finnish Cup)		League cup (Note: Includes Finnish League Cup)		Continental		Total	
Club	Season	Division	Apps	Goals	Apps	Goals	Apps	Goals	Apps	Goals	Apps	Goals
AC Oulu	2025	Veikkausliiga	0	0	0	0	–		–		0	0
AC Oulu	2026	Veikkausliiga	10	2	0	0	1	0	–		11	2
AC Oulu	Total		10	2	0	0	1	0	0	0	11	2
SalPa (loan)	2025	Ykkösliiga	3	0	–		–		–		3	0
OLS (loan)	2026	Ykkönen	11	3	2	2	–		–		13	5
Westerlo	2026–27	Belgian Pro League	0	0	0	0	–		–		0	0
Career total			24	5	2	2	1	0	0	0	27	7
