= Jörgen Moberg =

Swedish footballer (born 1971)

Personal information
- Full name: Nils Rickard Jörgen Moberg
- Date of birth: 2 June 1971 (age 55)
- Position: Defender

Senior career*
Years	Team	Apps	(Gls)
1989–1993	Östers IF		
1994–1997	Örgryte IS		
1998–2000	Ljungskile SK		

International career
1987	Sweden U17	2	(0)
1990–1992	Sweden U21/O	4	(0)
- * Club domestic league appearances and goals

Nils Rickard Jörgen Moberg (born 2 June 1971) is a Swedish former professional footballer who played as a defender. He represented Sweden at the 1992 Summer Olympics. Moberg played for Swedish domestic clubs Örgryte IS, Östers IF, and Ljungskile SK.
