= Mohamed Ben Haji =

Kuwaiti footballer

Mohamed Jasem Ben Haji
Personal information
- Date of birth: 28 December 1970 (age 55)
- Position: Midfielder

Senior career*
Years	Team	Apps	(Gls)
- Al Qadesiya

International career
- Kuwait
- * Club domestic league appearances and goals

Mohamed Jasem Ben Haji (born 28 December 1970) is a Kuwaiti footballer. He competed in the men's tournament at the 1992 Summer Olympics.
