= Silvio Lafuenti =

Italian footballer

Personal information
- Full name: Silvio Lafuenti
- Date of birth: 9 August 1970 (age 56)
- Place of birth: Ostia Lido, Italy
- Height: 1.78 m (5 ft 10 in)
- Position: Goalkeeper

Youth career
- A.C. Milan

Senior career*
Years	Team	Apps	(Gls)
1988–93	Lodigiani	10	(0)
1992	→ Savoia (loan)	5	(0)
1993–94	Ostiamare	34	(0)
1994–98	Avezzano	98	(0)
1998–99	Alessandria	33	(0)
1999–01	Livorno	16	(0)
2000–01	Alessandria	24	(0)
2001–03	Chieti	53	(0)
2003–05	Catanzaro	47	(0)
2005–07	Gallipoli	36	(0)
2006	→ Martina (loan)	17	(0)
2007–09	Cisco Roma	64	(0)
- * Club domestic league appearances and goals

Silvio Lafuenti (or spelled as La Fuenti; born 9 August 1970 in Ostia Lido, Italy) is an Italian retired footballer who played goalkeeper.
