= Aziz Azim =

Moroccan footballer (born 1970)

Personal information
- Date of birth: 5 March 1970 (age 56)
- Position: Midfielder

International career
Years	Team	Apps	(Gls)
- Morocco

Aziz Azim (born 5 March 1970) is a Moroccan former footballer. He competed in the 1992 Summer Olympics.
