= Arthur Moses =

Ghanaian footballer

Personal information
- Date of birth: 3 March 1973 (age 53)
- Place of birth: Accra, Ghana
- Height: 1.85 m (6 ft 1 in)
- Position: Striker

Senior career*
Years	Team	Apps	(Gls)
1992–1993	Stationery Stores		
1993–1995	Fortuna Düsseldorf	19	(2)
1995–1997	→ Toulon (loan)	51	(22)
1997–1998	→ Marseille (loan)	14	(3)
1998–2000	Marseille	5	(0)
1998–1999	Marseille B	10	(5)
2000–2001	Nîmes	37	(9)
2001	Al Ain		
2002–2004	Al-Shabab		
Total		136+	(41+)

International career
1994–1999	Ghana	7	(3)
- * Club domestic league appearances and goals

Arthur Moses (born 3 March 1973) is a Ghanaian former professional footballer who played as a striker. He is the owner and vice-president of Bechem Chelsea.

== Club career ==
Moses was born in Accra. In 1992, he was the leading scorer in the Nigerian Premier League with 11 as Stationery Stores won their final league title.

Moses joined French club Toulon on a two-year loan from German club Fortuna Düsseldorf in July 1995. Toulon secured an option to sign him permanently for €3 million.

In June 1997 Toulon was unable to exercise its option and sold it on to Marseille. In August Moses moved on a season-long loan to Marseille with the transfer fee for a permanent move again set at €3 million. In June 1998, Marseille agreed a transfer fee of less than €3 million and in August, Moses signed a three-year contract with Marseille.

== International career ==
Moses played for the Ghana national team at the 1998 African Cup of Nations.

== Post-playing career ==
On 31 October 2008, Moses became owner of Bechem Chelsea along with Tony Yeboah.
