= Fareed Mahboub =

Qatari footballer (born 1971)

Personal information
- Full name: Fareed Gholam Omar Mahboub
- Date of birth: 13 July 1971 (age 55)
- Place of birth: Qatar
- Position: Goalkeeper

Senior career*
| Years | Team | Apps | (Gls) |
- Al-Rayyan

International career
| 1987 | Qatar U16 | 4 | (0) |
| 1992 | Qatar U23 | 0 | (0) |
| 1993 | Qatar | 1 | (0) |
- * Club domestic league appearances and goals

Fareed Gholam Omar Mahboub (Arabic: فريد غلام•محبوب; born 13 July 1971) is a Qatari former footballer who played as a goalkeeper.

== Career ==
In 1987, Mahboub made four appearances for the Qatar under-16 national team squad at the 1987 FIFA U-16 World Championship in Canada, where they reached the quarter-finals. In 1992, he was called up to the Qatar under-23 national team for the 1992 Summer Olympics, where he failed to make an appearance. The following year, he made one appearance for the Qatar national team, in a 2–1 friendly defeat to Jordan.

Following his retirement from football, he worked as a coach at Al-Rayyan under Diego Aguirre and Manolo Jiménez. In 2014, he was appointed as the director of the Qatar national team.
