= Joël Tiéhi =

Ivorian footballer (born 1964)

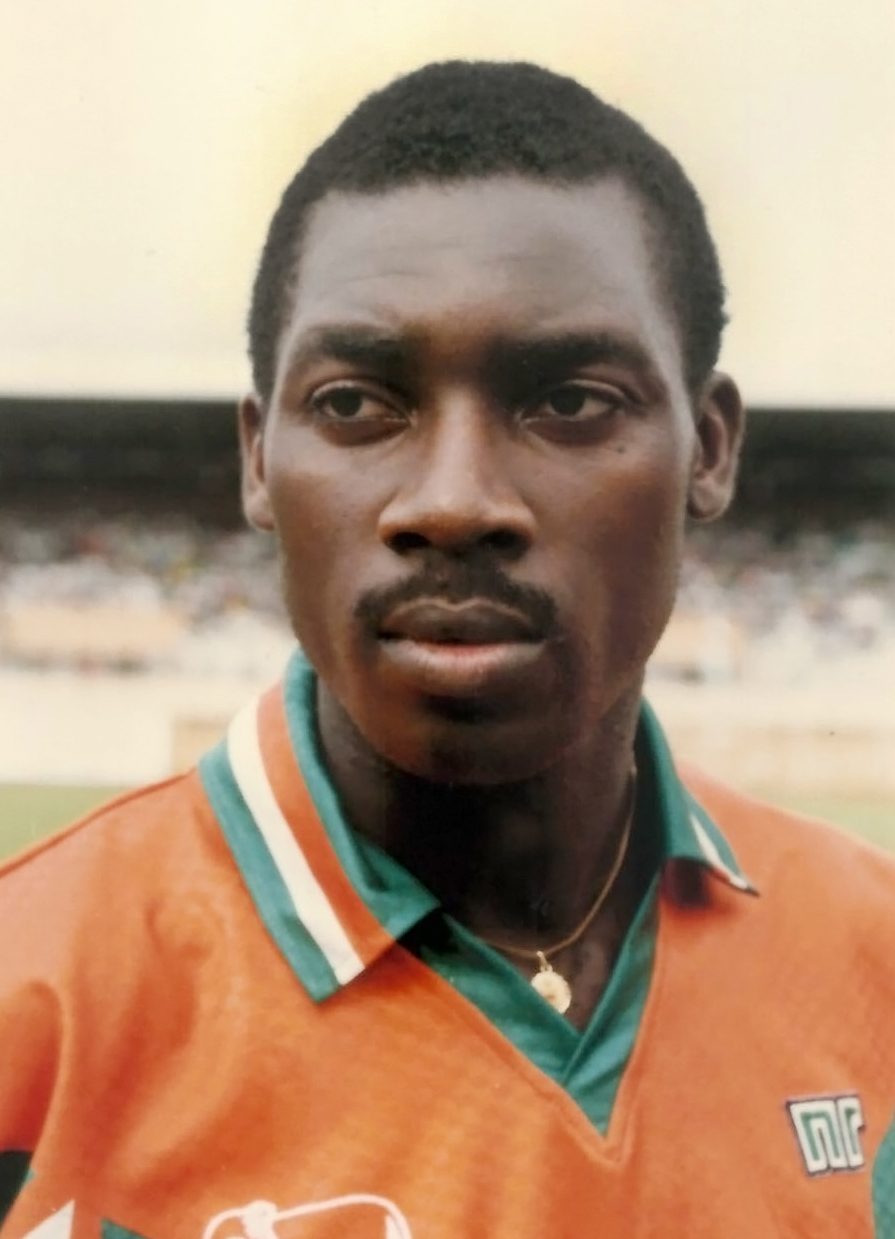
- Tiéhi in 1993

Personal information
- Full name: Djohan Joël Tiéhi
- Date of birth: 12 June 1964 (age 62)
- Place of birth: Abidjan, Ivory Coast
- Height: 1.80 m (5 ft 11 in)
- Position: Striker

Senior career*
Years	Team	Apps	(Gls)
1984–1987	Stade Abidjan		
1987–1994	Le Havre	163	(59)
1994–1996	Lens	46	(15)
1996–1997	FC Martigues	32	(8)
1997	Saint-Denis Saint-Leu	33	(22)
1997–1998	Toulouse	28	(10)
1998–2001	Al-Jazira Club		(41)
2001–2002	→ Al Ain FC (loan)		(7)
Total		302	(162)

International career
1987–1999	Ivory Coast	50	(28)
- * Club domestic league appearances and goals

Djohan Joël Tiéhi (born 12 June 1964) is an Ivorian retired professional footballer who played as a striker.

== Career ==
Tiéhi played in the French Ligue 1 and for the Ivory Coast national team. With his national team, he played at the 1992, 1994, 1996 and 1998 African Cup of Nations, winning the 1992 edition.

== Owner ==
Tiéhi is founder of the Centre de Formation Joël Tiéhi as of 2004.

== Personal life ==
Tiéhi has two sons, who are both footballers: Christ, an Ivorian youth international, and Jean-Pierre, who plays for Hamilton Academical, on loan from Fulham.

== Career statistics ==
=== International ===
Scores and results list Ivory Coast's goal tally first, score column indicates score after each Tiéhi goal.

List of international goals scored by Joël Tiéhi
No.	Date	Venue	Opponent	Score	Result	Competition	Ref.
1	4 November 1984	Independence Stadium, Bakau, Gambia	Gambia	2–1	2–3	1986 FIFA World Cup qualification	
2	22 March 1987	Abidjan, Ivory Coast	Zaire	1–1	1–3	Friendly	
3	19 July 1987	Abidjan, Ivory Coast	Malawi	2–0	2–0	1988 African Cup of Nations qualification	
4	13 January 1992	Stade Aline Sitoe Diatta, Ziguinchor, Senegal	Algeria	3–0	3–0	1992 African Cup of Nations	
5	10 October 1992	Felix Houphouet Boigny Stadium, Abidjan, Ivory Coast	Botswana	4–0	6–0	1994 FIFA World Cup qualification	
6	18 July 1993	Felix Houphouet Boigny Stadium, Abidjan, Ivory Coast	Algeria	1–0	1–0	1994 FIFA World Cup qualification	
7	25 September 1993	National Stadium, Surulere, Nigeria	Nigeria	1–2	1–4	1994 FIFA World Cup qualification	
8	27 March 1994	Sousse Olympic Stadium, Sousse, Tunisia	Sierra Leone	1–0	4–0	1994 African Cup of Nations	
9	27 March 1994	Sousse Olympic Stadium, Sousse, Tunisia	Sierra Leone	3–0	4–0	1994 African Cup of Nations	
10	27 March 1994	Sousse Olympic Stadium, Sousse, Tunisia	Sierra Leone	4–0	4–0	1994 African Cup of Nations	
11	3 April 1994	Sousse Olympic Stadium, Sousse, Tunisia	Ghana	1–0	2–1	1994 African Cup of Nations	
12	22 January 1995	Felix Houphouet Boigny Stadium, Abidjan, Ivory Coast	Burkina Faso	1–0	2–2	1996 African Cup of Nations qualification	
13	22 January 1995	Felix Houphouet Boigny Stadium, Abidjan, Ivory Coast	Burkina Faso	2–0	2–2	1996 African Cup of Nations qualification	
14	4 June 1995	Felix Houphouet Boigny Stadium, Abidjan, Ivory Coast	Morocco	1–0	2–0	1996 African Cup of Nations qualification	
15	30 July 1995	Stade du 4 Août, Ouagadougou, Burkina Faso	Burkina Faso	1–1	1–1	1996 African Cup of Nations qualification	
16	21 January 1996	EPRU Stadium, Port Elizabeth, South Africa	Mozambique	1–0	1–0	1996 African Cup of Nations	
17	6 October 1996	Stade du 5 Juillet, Algiers, Algeria	Algeria	1–3	1–4	1998 African Cup of Nations qualification	
18	23 February 1997	Stade Modibo Kéïta, Bamako, Mali	Mali	2–1	2–1	1998 African Cup of Nations qualification	
19	22 June 1997	Stade de la Paix, Bouaké, Ivory Coast	Algeria	1–1	2–1	1998 African Cup of Nations qualification	
20	27 July 1997	Stade de la Paix, Bouaké, Ivory Coast	Mali	1–0	4–2	1998 African Cup of Nations qualification	
21	27 July 1997	Stade de la Paix, Bouaké, Ivory Coast	Mali	2–0	4–2	1998 African Cup of Nations qualification	
22	29 January 1998	Stade de la Paix, Bouaké, Ivory Coast	Mozambique	2–1	4–1	Friendly	
23	1 February 1998	Stade de la Paix, Bouaké, Ivory Coast	Cameroon	1–0	1–0	Friendly	
24	8 February 1998	Stade Général Aboubacar Sangoulé Lamizana, Bobo-Dioulasso, Burkina Faso	Namibia	1–0	4–3	1998 African Cup of Nations	
25	8 February 1998	Stade Général Aboubacar Sangoulé Lamizana, Bobo-Dioulasso, Burkina Faso	Namibia	3–0	4–3	1998 African Cup of Nations	
26	16 February 1998	Stade Municipal, Ouagadougou, Burkina Faso	Angola	3–1	5–2	1998 African Cup of Nations	
27	16 February 1998	Stade Municipal, Ouagadougou, Burkina Faso	Angola	5–2	5–2	1998 African Cup of Nations	
28	11 April 1999	Felix Houphouet Boigny Stadium, Abidjan, Ivory Coast	Congo	2–0	2–0	2000 African Cup of Nations qualification	
