= Juan Marecos =

Paraguayan footballer (born 1969)

Personal information
- Date of birth: 21 August 1969 (age 57)
- Position: Defender

Senior career*
Years	Team	Apps	(Gls)
- Club Libertad

International career
- Paraguay
- * Club domestic league appearances and goals

Juan Marecos (born 21 August 1969) is a Paraguayan former footballer who played as a defender. He competed in the men's tournament at the 1992 Summer Olympics.
