= Fahad Rashid Al-Kuwari =

Qatari footballer (born 1972)

Personal information
- Date of birth: 27 September 1972 (age 54)

International career
Years	Team	Apps	(Gls)
- Qatar

Fahad Rashid Al-Kuwari (born 27 September 1972) is a Qatari footballer. He competed in the men's tournament at the 1992 Summer Olympics.
