= Mohamed El Badraoui =

Moroccan footballer (born 1971)

Personal information
- Date of birth: 27 June 1971 (age 55)
- Place of birth: Beni Mellal, Morocco
- Position: Striker

Senior career*
Years	Team	Apps	(Gls)
1996–1998	Espérance		
1998–1999	Erzurumspor	13	(5)
1999–2000	Bursaspor	5	(1)
2000–2001	Adanaspor	13	(3)

International career
–	Morocco		
- * Club domestic league appearances and goals

Mohamed El Badraoui (born 27 June 1971) is a Moroccan former professional footballer who played as a striker for several clubs in Turkey and the Morocco national football team.

El Badraoui played for Erzurumspor, Bursaspor and Adanaspor in the Turkish Süper Lig. He also played for Espérance Sportive de Tunis during its 1997 CAF Cup championship.

He made two appearances with the Morocco national football team at the 1992 Summer Olympics. El Badraoui played several matches for the national team, including participation in the 2000 African Cup of Nations.
