= Essam Abdel-Azim =

Egyptian footballer (born 1970)

Personal information
- Full name: Essam Abdel-Azim Deyab
- Date of birth: 1 November 1970 (age 55)
- Place of birth: Alexandria, Egypt
- Height: 1.85 m (6 ft 1 in)
- Position: Goalkeeper

Senior career*
Years	Team	Apps	(Gls)
1990–1994	Tersana SC		
1994–1996	Al-Ittihad Al-Iskandary		
1996–2002	Al-Masry		

International career
1994–1996	Egypt	9	(0)
- * Club domestic league appearances and goals

Essam Abdel-Azim (Arabic: عصام عبدالعظيم) (born 1 November 1970) is a former football footballer of Egypt national football team.

== Club career ==
Essam spent his professional career in the Egyptian Premier League with Tersana SC, Al-Ittihad Al-Iskandary and Al-Masry.

== International career ==
Essam was a member in Egypt team in 1992 Summer Olympics.
