= Tamer Abdul Hamid =

Egyptian footballer (born 1971)

Tamer Abdul-Hamid
Personal information
- Full name: Tamer Ahmed Abdul-Hamid
- Date of birth: 16 October 1971 (age 55)
- Place of birth: Cairo, Egypt
- Position: Defender

Senior career*
Years	Team	Apps	(Gls)
1987–1997	Zamalek		
1997–1998	Al Masry		

International career
1992	Egypt U-23		
- * Club domestic league appearances and goals

Tamer Ahmed Abdul-Hamid (born 16 October 1971) is an Egyptian footballer who played as a defender. He competed in the 1992 Summer Olympics.
