= 2004 CAF Champions League final =

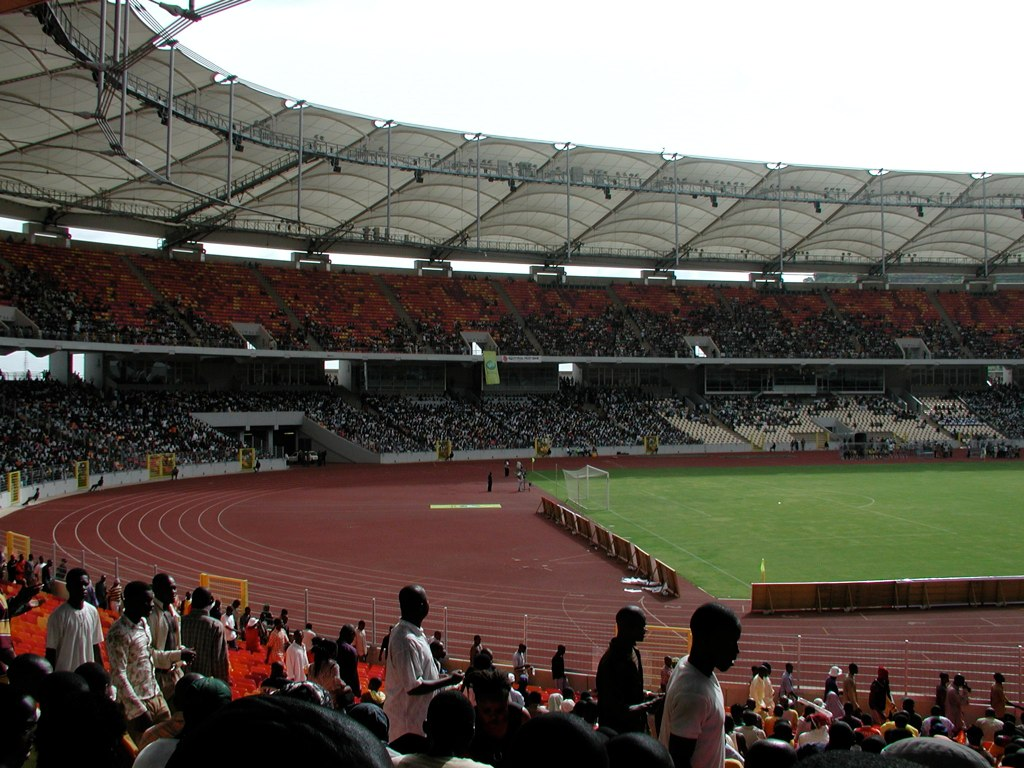
- Abuja Stadium hosted the podium where Enyimba lifted the trophy
- Event: 2004 CAF Champions League
Étoile du Sahel	Enyimba
(Tunisia)	(Nigeria)
3	3

First leg
Étoile du Sahel	Enyimba
2	1
- Date: 4 December 2004
- Venue: Stade Olympique de Sousse, Sousse
- Referee: Mohamed Benouza (Algeria)
- Attendance: 28,000

Second Leg
Enyimba	Étoile du Sahel
2	1
- After extra time Enyimba won 5–3 on penalties
- Date: 12 December 2004
- Venue: Nigeria National Stadium, Abuja
- Referee: Coffi Codjia (Benin)
- Attendance: 60,000

The 2004 CAF Champions League final was the final of the 2004 CAF Champions League.

It was a football tie held over two legs in December 2004 between Étoile du Sahel of Tunisia, and Enyimba of Nigeria.

== Qualified teams ==
In the following table, finals until 1996 were in the African Cup of Champions Club era, since 1997 were in the CAF Champions League era.

Team	Region	Previous finals appearances (bold indicates winners)
(Tunisia) Étoile du Sahel	UNAF (North Africa)	none
(Nigeria) Enyimba	WAFU (West Africa)	**2003**

== Venues ==
=== Stade Olympique de Sousse ===
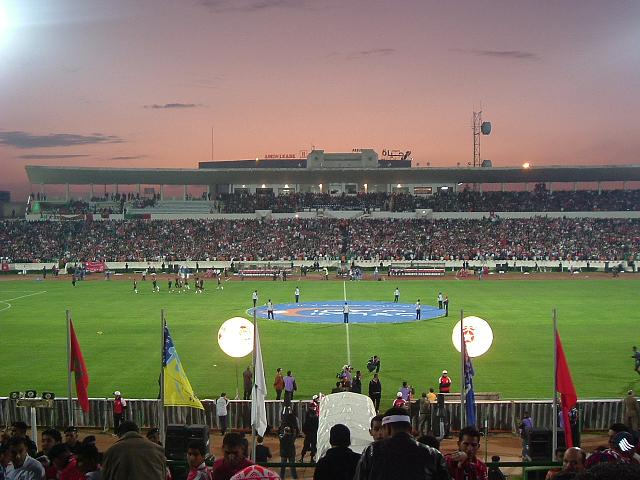
Stade Olympique in Sousse, Tunisia hosted the first leg.

Stade olympique de Sousse is a multi-purpose stadium in Sousse, Tunisia. It is used by the football team Étoile du Sahel, and was used for the 2004 African Cup of Nations. The stadium holds 28,000 people. It hosts within it the meetings played by the football team of the city: Étoile sportive du Sahel (ESS).

For many decades, Sousse footballers knew only the clay surfaces and knew the turf surfaces only when the stadium was inaugurated with an initial capacity of 10,000 places. It passes over the years to 15,000 seats and is then expanded again on the occasion of the 1994 African Cup of Nations with 6,000 additional seats to reach a capacity of 21,000 seats; A luminous panel is installed at the same time. The last expansion was carried out in 1999 to bring the capacity of the stadium to 28,000 seats for the 2001 Mediterranean Games, a reorganization of the gallery of honor was carried out, from a capacity of 70 to 217 places.

It hosted 1977 FIFA World Youth Championship, 1994 African Cup of Nations, 2001 Mediterranean Games and 2004 African Cup of Nations.

=== Abuja National Stadium ===
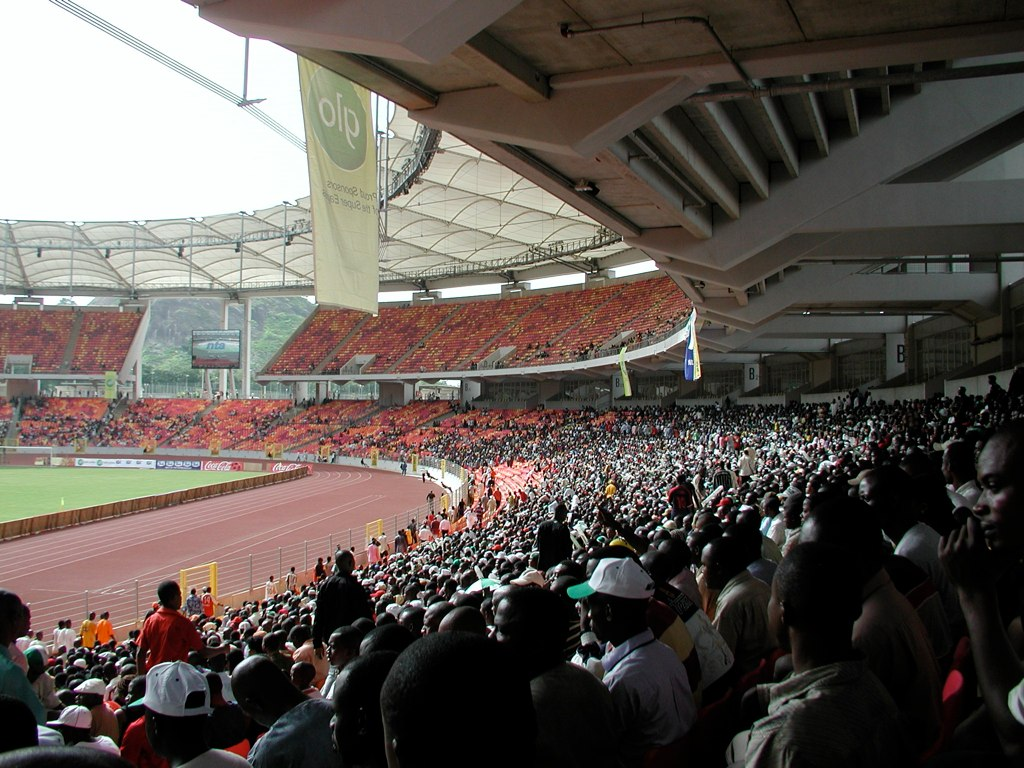
National Stadium in Abuja, Nigeria hosted the second leg.

Abuja National Stadium, Abuja is a multipurpose national sports stadium located in Abuja, in the Federal Capital Territory of Nigeria. The stadium serves as a home to the Nigerian national football team, as well as a center for various social, cultural, and religious events. The Federal Government of Nigeria approved the contract for the construction of the National Stadium complex and Games Village on 18 July 2000. The stadium was constructed to host the 8th All Africa Games which took place in October 2003.

In fact, CAF refused to hold the match in the city of Aba, the stronghold of Enyimba, because it did not comply with the CAF standards adopted for the stadiums. Enyimba announced that the African Champions League final will be played in the National Stadium of Lagos, but the Confederation of African Football has announced the transfer of the match from Lagos to the Nigerian capital Abuja.

== Road to final ==
(Tunisia) Étoile du Sahel				Round	(Nigeria) Enyimba			
Opponent	Agg.	1st leg	2nd leg	Qualifying rounds	Opponent	Agg.	1st leg	2nd leg
(Morocco) Hassania Agadir	2–0	2–0 (H)	0–0 (A)	First round	(Senegal) ASC Diaraf	3–2	3–0 (H)	0–2 (A)
(Ghana) Hearts of Oak	1–1 (5-4 p)	0–1 (A)	1–0 (H)	Second round	(Angola) Petro Atlético	3–2	1–1 (H)	2–1 (A)
Opponent	Result			Group stage	Opponent	Result		
(Malawi) Bakili Bullets	1–0 (A)			Matchday 1	(Ivory Coast) Africa Sports National	3–0 (A)		
(Ivory Coast) Africa Sports National	2–0 (H)			Matchday 2	(Malawi) Bakili Bullets	6–0 (H)		
(Nigeria) Enyimba	1–0 (H)			Matchday 3	(Tunisia) Étoile du Sahel	0–1 (A)		
(Nigeria) Enyimba	1–1 (A)			Matchday 4	(Tunisia) Étoile du Sahel	1–1 (H)		
(Malawi) Bakili Bullets	1–1 (H)			Matchday 5	(Ivory Coast) Africa Sports National	0–1 (H)		
(Ivory Coast) Africa Sports National	2–3 (A)			Matchday 6	(Malawi) Bakili Bullets	1–1 (A)		
Group A Winner: Pos / Team / Pld / W / D / L / GF / GA / GD / Pts / Qualification; **1** / (Tunisia) Étoile du Sahel / **6** / **3** / **2** / **1** / **8** / **5** / **+3** / **8** / **Advance to knockout stage**; 2 / (Nigeria) Enyimba / 6 / 2 / 2 / 2 / 11 / 4 / +7 / **6** / **Advance to knockout stage**; 3 / (Ivory Coast) Africa Sports National / 6 / 2 / 1 / 3 / 6 / 10 / −4 / **5**; 4 / (Malawi) Bakili Bullets / 6 / 1 / 3 / 2 / 5 / 11 / −6 / **5**; Source:				Final standings	Group A Runner-up: Pos / Team / Pld / W / D / L / GF / GA / GD / Pts / Qualification; 1 / (Tunisia) Étoile du Sahel / 6 / 3 / 2 / 1 / 8 / 5 / +3 / **8** / **Advance to knockout stage**; **2** / (Nigeria) Enyimba / **6** / **2** / **2** / **2** / **11** / **4** / **+7** / **6** / **Advance to knockout stage**; 3 / (Ivory Coast) Africa Sports National / 6 / 2 / 1 / 3 / 6 / 10 / −4 / **5**; 4 / (Malawi) Bakili Bullets / 6 / 1 / 3 / 2 / 5 / 11 / −6 / **5**; Source:			
Opponent	Agg.	1st leg	2nd leg	Knock-out stage	Opponent	Agg.	1st leg	2nd leg
(Senegal) Jeanne d'Arc	4–2	1–2 (A)	3–0 (H)	Semifinals	(Tunisia) ES Tunis	2–2 (6-5 p)	1–1 (H)	1–1 (A)

== Format ==
The final was decided over two legs, with aggregate goals used to determine the winner. If the sides were level on aggregate after the second leg, the away goals rule would have been applied, and if still level, the tie would have proceeded directly to a penalty shootout (no extra time is played).

== Matches ==
=== First leg ===
4 December 2004
17:00 UTC+1

Étoile du Sahel (Tunisia)	2–1	(Nigeria) Enyimba
Mhadhbi 44' (pen.); Traoré 53'		Nwanna 15'

Stade Olympique, Sousse
Attendance: 28,000
Referee: Mohamed Benouza (Algeria)

**Etoile du Sahel**	**Enyimba**

GK	16	(Nigeria) Austin Ejide
DF	27	(Guinea) Oumar Kalabane
DF	14	(Tunisia) Kais Zouaghi
DF	15	(Tunisia) Lotfi Sellami	(red card) 72'
DF	5	(Tunisia) Mohamed Miladi	(substituted off) 88'
MF	26	(Tunisia) Hakim Bargui
MF	6	(Tunisia) Ahmed Hammi
MF	7	(Tunisia) Zoubeir Baya
MF	25	(Tunisia) Imed Mhadhbi	(substituted off) 64'
MF	12	(Nigeria) Emeka Opara
FW	30	(Ivory Coast) Kandia Traoré
Substitutes:
GK	8	(Tunisia) Mohamed Jedidi	(substituted on) 64'
DF	28	(Tunisia) Marouane Bokri	(substituted on) 88'
Manager:
(Tunisia) Abdelmajid Chetali

GK	1	(Nigeria) Vincent Enyeama
DF	4	(Nigeria) Musa Aliyu
DF	3	(Nigeria) Obinna Nwaneri
DF	7	(Nigeria) Yusuf Mohamed
DF	13	(Nigeria) Ajibade Omolade
MF	6	(Nigeria) Jerome Ezoba
MF	8	(Nigeria) Ekene Ezenwa	(substituted off) 81'
MF	29	(Nigeria) David Tyavkase
FW	28	(Benin) Mouritala Ogunbiyi	(substituted off) 89'
FW	26	(Nigeria) Onyekachi Okonkwo	(red card) 31'
FW	23	(Nigeria) Emeka Nwanna	(substituted off) 47'
Substitutes:
GK	14	(Nigeria) Damien Udeh	(substituted on) 47'
DF	10	(Nigeria) Eric Fasindo	(substituted on) 81'
DF	21	(Ghana) Joetex Frimpong	(substituted on) 89'
Manager:
(Nigeria) Okey Emordi

Assistant referees:
Olivier Safari Kabene (DR Congo)
Waleed Ahmed Ali (Sudan)
Fourth official:
Sidi Alioum (Cameroon)

=== Second leg ===
12 December 2004
15:00 UTC+0

Enyimba (Nigeria)	2–1	(Tunisia) Étoile du Sahel
Enyeama 43' (pen.); Ogunbiyi 53'	Report	Zouaghi 63'
Penalties
Ezoba (penalty scored); Aliyu (penalty scored); Ezenwa (penalty scored); Udeh (penalty scored); Yusuf (penalty scored)	5–3	(penalty scored) Miladi; (penalty missed) Ben Frej; (penalty scored) Traoré; (penalty scored) Baya

Nigeria National Stadium, Abuja
Attendance: 60,000
Referee: Coffi Codjia (Benin)

**Enyimba**	**Etoile du Sahel**

GK	**1**	(Nigeria) Vincent Enyeama		(substituted off) 90'
DF	**4**	(Nigeria) Musa Aliyu
DF	**3**	(Nigeria) Obinna Nwaneri	(yellow card) 54'
DF	**7**	(Nigeria) Yusuf Mohamed
DF	**13**	(Nigeria) Ajibade Omolade
MF	**14**	(Nigeria) Damian Udeh
MF	**6**	(Nigeria) Jerome Ezoba
MF	?	(Nigeria) Ndidi Anumnu
MF	**23**	(Nigeria) Emeka Nwanna		(substituted off) 80'
FW	**29**	(Nigeria) David Tyavkase
FW	**28**	(Benin) Mouritala Ogunbiyi
Substitutes:
GK	?	(Nigeria) Dele Aiyenugba		(substituted on) 90'
DF	**8**	(Nigeria) Ekene Ezenwa		(substituted on) 80'
FW	**21**	(Ghana) Joetex Frimpong
Manager:
(Nigeria) Okey Emordi

GK	**16**	(Nigeria) Austin Ejide
DF	**27**	(Guinea) Oumar Kalabane
DF	**13**	(Tunisia) Saber Ben Frej
DF	**5**	(Tunisia) Mohamed Miladi
DF	?	(Tunisia) Marouane Bokri
MF	**7**	(Tunisia) Zoubeir Baya
MF	**6**	(Tunisia) Ahmed Hammi
MF	?	(Tunisia) Mejdi Traoui	(substituted off) 60'
MF	**25**	(Tunisia) Imed Mhadhbi
MF	**30**	(Ivory Coast) Kandia Traoré
FW	**14**	(Tunisia) Kais Zouaghi	(yellow card) 47'
Substitutes:
MF	**26**	(Tunisia) Hakim Bargui	(substituted on) 60'
FW	?	(Nigeria) Ogochukwu Obiakor
Manager:
(Tunisia) Abdelmajid Chetali

Assistant referees:
Jean-Claude Birumushahu (Burundi)
Marwa Range (Kenya)
Fourth official:
Janny Sikazwe (Zambia)
