= 2004–05 USM Alger season =

USM Alger
2004–05 season
- President: Saïd Allik
- Head coach: Noureddine Saâdi (from 24 August 2004) (until January 2005); Djamel Menad (from January 2005) (until 16 May 2005); Mustapha Aksouh (c) (from April 2005)
- Stadium: Stade Omar Hammadi
- Division 1: 1st
- Algerian Cup: Round of 64
- Champions League: Second round
- Confederation Cup: Play-off round
- Top goalscorer: League: Billel Dziri (11 goals); All: Billel Dziri (12 goals)

In the 2004–05 season, USM Alger competed in the Division 1 for the 25th time, as well as the Algerian Cup. It was their 10th consecutive season in the top flight of Algerian football. They were competing in Ligue 1, the CAF Champions League and the Algerian Cup.

== Summary season ==
The 2004–05 season marked the end of an era for USM Alger supporters. Under the leadership of Mustapha Aksouh, the club won its fifth league title, which was also the final championship during Saïd Allik’s tenure as president. In the last round, while the relegation battle was contested between CR Belouizdad and OMR El Annasser, USM Alger decisively defeated OMR El Annasser 4–0, with all goals scored by 19-year-old Michael Eneramo, making him the youngest player to score a hat-trick for the first team. The team’s determination in this match was partly motivated by lingering resentment from the 1993–94 second division season, when USM Alger narrowly missed promotion after ASO Chlef defeated OMR El Annasser in the final round, leading USM Alger to allege that ASO Chlef had received undue assistance.

== Squad list ==
Players and squad numbers last updated on 13 June 2005.
Note: Flags indicate national team as has been defined under FIFA eligibility rules. Players may hold more than one non-FIFA nationality.

No.	Nat.	Position	Name	Date of birth (age)	Signed from	Apps.	Goals
Goalkeepers
24	(Algeria)	Farid Belmellat	GK	18 October 1970 (aged 34)	(Algeria) JSM Béjaïa	0	0
25	(Algeria)	Merouane Abdouni	GK	27 March 1981 (aged 23)	(Algeria) USM El Harrach	55	0
27	(Algeria)	Mohamed Lamine Zemmamouche	GK	19 March 1985 (aged 19)	(Algeria) Youth system	5	0
Defenders
2	(Algeria)	Mohamed Hamdoud	RB / CB	9 June 1976 (aged 28)	(Algeria) Youth system	0	0
3	(Algeria)	Tarek Ghoul	LB	6 January 1975 (aged 28)	(Algeria) USM El Harrach	0	0
4	(Algeria)	Salim Aribi	CB	16 December 1974 (aged 30)	(Algeria) CA Batna	85	7
5	(Algeria)	Mounir Zeghdoud	CB	18 November 1970 (aged 34)	(Algeria) USM Aïn Beïda	0	0
12	(Algeria)	Youcef Siahi	CB	3 October 1984 (aged 20)	(Algeria) Youth system	3	0
17	(Algeria)	Moulay Haddou	LB	14 June 1975 (aged 29)	(Algeria) MC Oran	41	3
18	(Algeria)	Rabah Deghmani	CB	5 October 1975 (aged 29)	(Algeria) IB Khémis El Khechna	0	0
20	(Algeria)	Mahieddine Meftah	LB / CB / RB	25 September 1968 (aged 36)	(Algeria) JS Kabylie	0	0
29	(Algeria)	Abdelkader Besseghir	RB	5 March 1978 (aged 26)	(Algeria) GC Mascara	24	1
31	(Algeria)	Zineddine Mekkaoui	LB	10 January 1987 (aged 17)	(Algeria) Youth system	1	0
Midfielders
6	(Algeria)	Farid Djahnine	MF	16 August 1976 (aged 28)	(Algeria) Youth system	0	0
7	(Algeria)	Amar Ammour	AM	10 September 1976 (aged 28)	(Algeria) ASM Oran	103	20
8	(Algeria)	Billel Dziri	CM	21 January 1972 (aged 32)	(France) CS Sedan Ardennes	0	0
10	(Algeria)	Hocine Achiou	AM	27 April 1979 (aged 25)	(Algeria) Youth system	0	0
22	(Burkina Faso)	Hamidou Balbone	MF	17 January 1977 (aged 27)	(Burkina Faso) EF Ouagadougou	36	7
26	(Algeria)	Hocine Metref	DM	1 January 1984 (aged 21)	(Algeria) Youth system	68	7
28	(Algeria)	Karim Ghazi	DM	6 January 1979 (aged 25)	(Tunisia) Espérance de Tunis	0	0
Forwards
9	(Mali)	Mintou Doucoure	RW	19 July 1982 (aged 22)	(Mali) JS Centre Salif Keita	18	4
11	(Algeria)	Issaad Bourahli	ST	23 March 1974 (aged 30)	(Algeria) ES Sétif	76	34
14	(Algeria)	Mohamed Amine Belkheïr	FW	15 April 1984 (aged 20)	(Algeria) Youth system	24	5
19	(Algeria)	Rabie Benchergui	ST	14 March 1978 (aged 26)	(Algeria) ASM Oran	80	32
21	(Algeria)	Rafik Deghiche	FW	1 October 1983 (aged 21)	(Algeria) Youth system	24	2
23	(Mali)	Mamadou Diallo	CF	17 April 1982 (aged 22)	(Mali) JS Centre Salif Keita	35	19
31	(Nigeria)	Michael Eneramo	ST	26 November 1986 (aged 18)	(Tunisia) Espérance de Tunis	16	8

== Transfers ==
=== In ===
Date	Pos	Player	From club	Transfer fee	Source
1 July 2004	DF	(Algeria) Moulay Haddou	(Algeria) MC Oran	Undisclosed	
1 July 2004	DF	(Algeria) Abdelkader Besseghir	(Algeria) GC Mascara	Undisclosed	
1 July 2004	FW	(Algeria) Mohamed Amine Belkheïr	(Algeria) JS Kabylie	Undisclosed	
1 July 2004	FW	(Algeria) Issaad Bourahli	(Algeria) ES Sétif	Undisclosed	
1 July 2004	FW	(Mali) Mintou Doucoure	(Mali) JS Centre Salif Keita	Undisclosed	
22 July 2004	FW	(Algeria) Issaad Bourahli	ES Sétif	Undisclosed	
1 December 2004	FW	(Algeria) Karim Ali Hadji	(Algeria) ASO Chlef	Undisclosed	
31 December 2004	MF	(Algeria) Karim Ghazi	(Tunisia) Espérance de Tunis	Loan Return	
2 January 2005	CF	(Nigeria) Michael Eneramo	(Tunisia) Espérance de Tunis	Loan for one year	

=== Out ===
Date	Pos	Player	To club	Transfer fee	Source
1 July 2004	FW	(Algeria) Ali Meçabih	(Algeria) USM Blida	Undisclosed	
1 July 2004	MF	(Algeria) Karim Ghazi	(Tunisia) Espérance de Tunis	Loan	
1 July 2004	FW	(Algeria) Mohamed Cheraïtia	(Algeria) NA Hussein Dey	Undisclosed	
1 July 2004	FW	(Algeria) Fadel Ryad Settara	(Algeria) OMR El Annasser	Undisclosed	
1 July 2004	FW	(Algeria) Moncef Ouichaoui	(Algeria) JS Kabylie	Undisclosed	
25 December 2004	CF	(Mali) Mamadou Diallo	(France) Nantes	700 000 euros	
1 January 2005	DF	(Algeria) Tarek Ghoul	(Algeria) USM Blida	Undisclosed	
1 January 2005	MF	(Burkina Faso) Hamidou Balbone	(Algeria) ASO Chlef	Loan	

== Competitions ==
=== Overview ===
Competition	Record								Started round	Final position / round	First match	Last match
Competition	G	W	D	L	GF	GA	GD	Win %	Started round	Final position / round	First match	Last match
Division 1	30	21	4	5	55	27	+28	70.00	—N/a	Champion	20 August 2004	13 June 2005
Algerian Cup	1	0	0	1	0	1	−1	0.00	Round of 64		3 January 2005	
2004 Champions League	6	2	1	3	8	8	+0	33.33	Group stage		11 July 2004	17 October 2004
2005 Champions League	4	2	1	1	9	3	+6	50.00	First round	Second Round	6 March 2005	22 April 2005
Confederation Cup	2	0	2	0	2	2	+0	0.00	Play-off round		6 May 2005	21 May 2005
Total	43	25	8	10	74	41	+33	58.14				

=== Division 1 ===
==== League table ====
Pos	Team	Pld	W	D	L	GF	GA	GD	Pts	Qualification or relegation
1	USM Alger (C)	30	21	4	5	55	27	+28	67	Qualification for the 2006 CAF Champions League
2	JS Kabylie	30	16	6	8	44	22	+22	54	Qualification for the 2006 CAF Champions League
3	MC Alger	30	14	7	9	39	44	−5	49	Qualification for the 2005–06 Arab Champions League
4	NA Hussein Dey	30	11	10	9	29	19	+10	43	Qualification for the 2006 CAF Confederation Cup
5	CA Bordj Bou Arreridj	30	10	13	7	32	25	+7	43	Qualification for the 2005–06 Arab Champions League

Updated to match(es) played on 13 June 2005. Source: DZFoot
Rules for classification: 1) points; 2) head-to-head points; 3) head-to-head goal difference; 4) goal difference; 5) total goals; 6) fairplay ranking; 7) playoff.
(C) Champions

==== Results summary ====
Overall								Home						Away					
Pld	W	D	L	GF	GA	GD	Pts	W	D	L	GF	GA	GD	W	D	L	GF	GA	GD
30	21	4	5	54	26	+28	67	12	1	2	31	12	+19	9	3	3	23	14	+9

Last updated: 12 December 2014.
Source: Competitive matches

==== Results by round ====
Round	1	2	3	4	5	6	7	8	9	10	11	12	13	14	15	16	17	18	19	20	21	22	23	24	25	26	27	28	29	30
Ground	H	A	H	A	H	A	H	A	H	A	H	A	H	H	A	A	H	A	H	A	H	A	H	A	H	A	H	A	A	H
Result	W	W	W	L	D	W	L	W	W	W	W	W	W	W	W	D	W	L	W	D	W	W	L	D	W	W	W	W	L	W
Position	1	1	1	2	2	2	2	2	2	1	1	1	1	1	1	1	1	1	1	1	1	1	1	1	1	1	1	1	1	1

Source: Competitive matches
A = Away; H = Home; W = Win; D = Draw; L = Loss

==== Matches ====
20 August 2004 Round 1	USM Alger	3–0	US Chaouia	Bologhine
	Balbone 43'; Dziri 62', 90+1'; Achiou (yellow card) 69' Abdouni, Hamdoud, Haddou, Deghmani, Zeghdoud, Djahnine (substituted off) 82' (Meftah, (substituted on) 82'), Ammour (substituted off) 78' (Besseghier, (substituted on) 78'), Dziri, Balbone (substituted off) 59' (Belkheïr, (substituted on) 59'), Achiou, Bourahli.	Report	Ouari (yellow card) 17'; Lakhdari (yellow card) 22'; Mohamed Ouali (yellow card) 26'; Lamri (yellow card) 36'; Irmal (yellow card) 82' Belkalem, Adel, Lamri (substituted off) 46' (Lahouassa, (substituted on) 46'), Irmal, Beghou, Defnoun, Kassa, Ghediri, Louar (substituted off) 67' (Bekha, (substituted on) 67'), Mira (substituted off) 46' (Ziani, (substituted on) 46'), Maireche.	Stadium: Omar Hamadi Stadium; Referee: Redouane Mehidi; Assistant referees: Ouadah, Deffar

26 August 2004 Round 2	CS Constantine	1–3	USM Alger	Constantine
	Sedrati (yellow card) 27'; Zerdia (yellow card) 50'; Chouieb 73' Bensahnoun, Sedrati, Zerdia (substituted off) 80' (Arama, (substituted on) 80'), Maïza, Bakha, Chouaib, Saibi, Medjoudj, Fenier (substituted off) 25' (Adel Bacha, (substituted on) 25'), Ouachem, Mohamed Amroune.	Report	Hamdoud (yellow card) 34'; Balbone (yellow card) 50'; Medjoudj 62' (o.g.); Meftah (yellow card) 62'; Bourahli 40', 90+3' Abdouni, Hamdoud, Zeghdoud, Dziri, Achiou, Bourahli, Haddou, Deghmani, Meftah, Balbone (substituted off) 80' (Metref, (substituted on) 80'), Besseghir (substituted off) 59' (Ali Hadji, (substituted on) 59').	Stadium: Stade Mohamed Hamlaoui; Referee: Mohamed Amine Benaissa; Assistant referees: Belebsir, Chaker

7 November 2004 Round 3	USM Alger	2–0	CA Bordj Bou Arreridj	Bologhine
	Diallo 38'; Belkheïr 62' Abdouni, Hamdoud, Aribi, Djahnine, Amour (substituted off) 75' (Meftah, (substituted on) 75'), Achiou, Haddou, Deghiche (substituted off) 50' (Belkheïr, (substituted on) 50'), Diallo, Metref, Benseghir.	Report	Kial, Deffaf, Laggoun, Houari, Benchadi (substituted off) 90' (Hammouche, (substituted on) 90'), Khesrani, Djaref, Mani, Koula (substituted off) 85' (Azzedine Rahim, (substituted on) 85'), Khedhara, Maouche.	Stadium: Omar Hamadi Stadium; Referee: Houari Belkacem; Assistant referees: Ighir, Chibane

16 September 2004 Round 4	JS Kabylie	2–1	USM Alger	Tizi Ouzou
	Zazou (yellow card) 11' (yellow-red card) 74'; Endzanga 17' (red card) 40'; Berguiga 56'; Habri (yellow card) 65'; Raho (yellow card) 85' Gaouaoui, Driouèche, Habri, Zafour, Zazou, Raho, Belkaid (substituted off) 79' (Djillali, (substituted on) 79'), Bendahmane, Hamlaoui, Berguiga (substituted off) 71' (Ouichaoui, (substituted on) 71'), Endzanga.	Report	Meftah (yellow card) 33'; Achiou (yellow card) 43'; Besseghir 90+2' Abdouni, Hamdoud (substituted off) 60' (Besseghir, (substituted on) 60'), Zeghdoud, Ammour, Dziri, Achiou (substituted off) 86' (Metref, (substituted on) 86'), Meftah (substituted off) 60' (Ali Hadji, (substituted on) 60'), Haddou, Bourahli, Diallo, Deghmani.	Stadium: Stade 1er Novembre 1954; Referee: Touati Djaballah; Assistant referees: Belkhir, Benchia

20 September 2004 Round 5	USM Alger	2–2	USM Annaba	Bologhine
	Diallo 50'; Heddou 52' Abdouni, Deghmani, Hamdoud, Zeghdoud, Haddou, Balbone (substituted off) 46' (Ali Hadji, (substituted on) 46'), Djahnine, Meftah (substituted off) 46' (Metref, (substituted on) 46'), Dziri, Bourahli, Diallo.		Hamadou 41'; El Hadi 51' Hacen Houamed, Ait Ali, Latrèche, Tibermacine, Hammadou (substituted off) 67' (Athmani, (substituted on) 67'), Younes, Boucherit, Boudar, Loukili, Adlène Bensaïd (substituted off) 82' (Aouamri, (substituted on) 82'), El Hadi (substituted off) 90+2' (Selhat, (substituted on) 90+2').	Stadium: Omar Hamadi Stadium; Referee: Mohamed Benouza; Assistant referees: Kaïd, Mektous

30 September 2004 Round 6	WA Tlemcen	0–1	USM Alger	Tlemcen
	Fethi Zitouni, Kherbouche, Sid El Hadj, Yekhlef, Hamedi, Kherris, Hachemi (substituted off) 66' (Benyamina, (substituted on) 66'), Meziani (substituted off) 46' (Chaïb, (substituted on) 46'), Belgherri, Ali Dahleb (substituted off) 79' (Berrane, (substituted on) 79'), Boulanseur.		Diallo 32' Abdouni, Deghmani, Hamdoud (substituted off) 46' (Haddou, (substituted on) 46'), Zeghdoud, Besseghier, Djahnine, Metref, Dziri, Achiou, Ammour (substituted off) 67' (Ali Hadji, (substituted on) 67'), Diallo (substituted off) 80' (Benchergui, (substituted on) 80').	Stadium: Stade des 3 Frères Zerga; Referee: Belkacem Boumaâza; Assistant referees: Feddaoui, Salhi

13 October 2004 Round 7	USM Alger	0–1	CR Belouizdad	Algiers
	Abdouni, Deghmani, Aribi, Hamdoud (substituted off) 63' (Ali Hadji, (substituted on) 63'), Zeghdoud, Haddou (substituted off) 74' (Belkheïr, (substituted on) 74'), Djahnine, Metref, Dziri, Ammour, Benchergui.	Report	Rouaighia 71' Mezair, Boutnaf, Boussaid, Amieur, Akniouene, Slatni, Ouslati (substituted off) 83' (Atef Saadi, (substituted on) 83'), Belhamel, Harkas, Chache (substituted off) 46' (Mounir Dob, (substituted on) 46'), Rouaighia.	Stadium: Stade 5 Juillet 1962; Referee: Mohamed Amine Belhacène; Assistant referees: Garoui, Chouih

23 October 2004 Round 8	MC Alger	1–2	USM Alger	Algiers
	Daham 7' Benfissa, Bouacida, Babouche, Amrane, Dellalou, Fodhili (substituted off) 75' (Kechout, (substituted on) 75'), Ouahid, Selmi, Maouche (substituted off) 46' (Braham-Chaouch, (substituted on) 46'), Djabelkheir (substituted off) 67' (Benali, (substituted on) 67'), Daham.		Diallo 11'; Achiou 26' Abdouni, Deghmani, Aribi, Hamdoud, Zeghdoud, Metref (substituted off) 83' (Haddou, (substituted on) 83'), Dziri, Achiou, Ammour (substituted off) 90' (Djahnine, (substituted on) 90'), Bourahli, Diallo (substituted off) 74' (Benchergui, (substituted on) 74').	Stadium: Stade 5 Juillet 1962; Referee: Kamel Berber; Assistant referees: Djezzar, Talbi

28 October 2004 Round 9	USM Alger	1–0	GC Mascara	Bologhine
	Metref 72' Abdouni, Deghmani, Aribi, Haddou, Besseghier, Djahnine (substituted off) 78' (Balbone, (substituted on) 78'), Metref, Dziri, Ammour, Bourahli (substituted off) 89' (Ghoul, (substituted on) 89'), Diallo.		Mokdat, Benregiueg, Dahmane (substituted off) 67' (Senouci, (substituted on) 67'), Mazri, Boussada, El Hadjari, Abaci (substituted off) 83' (Benfetta, (substituted on) 83'), Benabila, Guessoum, Amaouche, Bouras.	Stadium: Omar Hamadi Stadium; Referee: Mustapha Ferradi; Assistant referees: Sedrati, Seghiri

4 November 2004 Round 10	ES Sétif	1–2	USM Alger	Sétif
	Fellahi 85' Benabdelkader, Bachir Bensaid, Kechairi, Lahlou, Madoui, Torchi, Benchaïra, Laâmeche (substituted off) 79' (Said Saihi, (substituted on) 79'), Hadj Aïssa, Derradj (substituted off) 54' (Messali, (substituted on) 54'), Keraghel (substituted off) 54' (Fellahi, (substituted on) 54').		Achiou 70'; Dziri 88' Abdouni, Aribi, Hamdoud, Zeghdoud, Haddou, Djahnine, Metref (substituted off) 46' (Meftah, (substituted on) 46'), Dziri, Achiou, Ammour (substituted off) 90' (Balbone, (substituted on) 90'), Diallo (substituted off) 82' (Deghiche, (substituted on) 82').	Stadium: Stade 8 Mai 1945; Referee: Mustapha Boumediene Mansouri; Assistant referees: Bechirane, Bouanani

11 November 2004 Round 11	USM Alger	1–0	ASO Chlef	Bologhine
(, ')	Belkheir 90+2' Abdouni, Hamdoud (substituted off) 66' (Besseghir, (substituted on) 66'), Arribi, Ammour, Achiou, Haddou, Dziri, Diallo, Deghmani, Metref, Bourahli (substituted off) 66' (Belkheir, (substituted on) 66').	Report	, , , , , , , , , , .	Stadium: Omar Hamadi Stadium; Referee: Mohamed Khelifi; Assistant referees: Sedrate, Belakhal

18 November 2004 Round 12	USM Blida	0–2	USM Alger	Blida
	, , , , , , , , , , .	Report	Dziri 9', 72' Abdouni, Hamdoud, Arribi, Djahnine (substituted off) 46' (Metref, (substituted on) 46'), Ammour (substituted off) 81' (Balbone, (substituted on) 81'), Dziri, Bourahli (substituted off) 88' (Belkheir, (substituted on) 88'), Haddou, Daghmani, Meftah, Besseghir.	Stadium: Stade Mustapha Tchaker; Referee: Touati Djaballah; Assistant referees: Belkheir, Benchaïb

2 December 2004 Round 13	USM Alger	1–0	NA Hussein Dey	Algiers
	Hamdoud 67' Abdouni, Deghmani, Aribi, Hamdoud, Haddou, Besseghier, Meftah, Metref, Dziri (substituted off) 46' (Belkheïr, (substituted on) 46'), Ammour (substituted off) 46' (Balbone, (substituted on) 46'), Diallo (substituted off) 90+2' (Ali Hadji, (substituted on) 90+2').		, , , , , , , , , , .	Stadium: Stade 5 Juillet 1962; Referee: Mohamed Kestali; Assistant referees: Bechaïr, Semara

9 December 2004 Round 14	USM Alger	2–1	MC Oran	Bologhine
	Ammour 7'; Metref 44' Abdouni, Hamdoud, Haddou, Aribi, Zeghdoud, Djahnine, Metref (substituted off) 90' (Meftah, (substituted on) 90'), Dziri, Ammour, Bourahli (substituted off) 74' (Besseghir, (substituted on) 74'), Diallo (substituted off) 79' (Benchergui, (substituted on) 79').	Report	Daoud 19', , , , , , , , , , .	Stadium: Omar Hamadi Stadium; Referee: Belkacem Boumaâza; Assistant referees: Salhi, Bouzini

16 December 2004 Round 15	OMR El Annasser	1–3	USM Alger	Boufarik
	Haddouche 62', , , , , , , , , , .		Benchergui 17', 24'; Dziri 78' Abdouni, Deghmani (substituted off) 62' (Besseghier, (substituted on) 62'), Hamdoud, Zeghdoud, Haddou (substituted off) 78' (Meftah, (substituted on) 78'), Djahnine, Metref, Dziri (substituted off) 82' (Belkheïr, (substituted on) 82'), Ammour, Benchergui, Bourahli.	Stadium: Stade Mohamed Reggaz; Referee: Houari Belkacem; Assistant referees: Deffar, Ouadah

13 January 2005 Round 16	US Chaouia	0–0	USM Alger	Oum El Bouaghi
	, , , , , , , , , , .		Abdouni, Hamdoud, Zeghdoud, Haddou, Besseghier, Ghazi, Meftah, Dziri, Achiou, Ammour, Benchergui (substituted off) 62' (Doucouré, (substituted on) 62').	Stadium: Stade Zerdani-Hsouma; Assistant referees: Gaïd, Meknous

8 January 2005 Round 17	USM Alger	3–0	CS Constantine	Bologhine
	Hamdoud 14' (pen.); Belkheir 58'; Dziri 77' Belmellat, Hamdoud, Zeghdoud, Ammour, Dziri, Doucouré, Achiou, Haddou, Benchergui (substituted off) 42' (Belkheïr, (substituted on) 42'), Meftah, Ghazi (substituted off) 74' (Bensegheir, (substituted on) 74').	Report	, , , , , , , , , , .	Stadium: Omar Hamadi Stadium; Referee: Mohamed Kestali; Assistant referees: Bechari, Samara

31 January 2005 Round 18	CA Bordj Bou Arreridj	3–0	USM Alger	Bordj Bou Arréridj
	Derbal 19', 62'; Nankop 78', , , , , , , , , , .	Report	Abdouni, Hamdoud, Zaghdoud, Djahnine, Doucoure (substituted off) 78' (Eneramo, (substituted on) 78'), Haddou, Achiou, Bourahli, Doghmani, Meftah (substituted off) 49' (Metref, (substituted on) 49'), Ghazi (substituted off) 78' (Belkhir, (substituted on) 78').	Stadium: Stade 20 Août 1955; Referee: Belkacem Boumaâza; Assistant referees: Salhi, Bouziane

10 February 2005 Round 19	USM Alger	2–1	JS Kabylie	Bologhine
	Djahnine 13'; Eneramo 42' Abdouni, Hamdoud, Zeghdoud, Haddou, Djahnine, Ghazi, Meftah, Dziri, Ammour (substituted off) 90' (Besseghier, (substituted on) 90'), Bourahli (substituted off) 72' (Metref, (substituted on) 72'), Eneramo.		Belkaïd 74' (pen.), , , , , , , , , , .	Stadium: Omar Hamadi Stadium; Referee: Mohamed Benouza; Assistant referees: Meknous, Kaïd

17 February 2005 Round 20	USM Annaba	1–1	USM Alger	Annaba
	Bensaïd 45', , , , , , , , , , .	Report	Djahnine 52' Abdouni, Deghmani (substituted off) 80' (Benseghir, (substituted on) 80'), Hamdoud, Zeghdoud, Haddou, Djahnine, Ghazi, Dziri, Ammour (substituted off) 86' (Metref, (substituted on) 86'), Eneramo, Doucouré (substituted off) 67' (Belkhir, (substituted on) 67').	Stadium: Stade Abdelkader Chabou; Referee: Djamel Haimoudi; Assistant referees: Kerraï, Omari

24 February 2005 Round 21	USM Alger	2–1	WA Tlemcen	Bologhine
	Dziri 13'; Hamdoud 81' (pen.) Abdouni, Hamdoud, Zeghdoud, Haddou, Djahnine, Ghazi, Meftah, Dziri, Achiou, Ammour (substituted off) 60' (Bourahli, (substituted on) 60'), Eneramo (substituted off) 85' (Metref, (substituted on) 85').	Report	Hachemi 35', , , , , , , , , , .	Stadium: Omar Hamadi Stadium; Referee: Mohamed Khelifi; Assistant referees: Belbcir, Benkahla

10 March 2005 Round 22	CR Belouizdad	0–3	USM Alger	Algiers
	, , , , , , , , , , .		Haddou 42'; Eneramo 60'; Ghazi 90' Abdouni, Hamdoud, Zeghdoud, Haddou, Ghazi, Meftah, Metref, Dziri (substituted off) 76' (Doucouré, (substituted on) 76'), Achiou (substituted off) 73' (Besseghier, (substituted on) 73'), Ammour, Eneramo.	Stadium: Stade 5 Juillet 1962; Referee: Mohamed Zekrini; Assistant referees: Berrahmoune, Djezzar

14 May 2005 Round 23	USM Alger	1–2	MC Alger	Algiers
	Dziri 9' Abdouni, Hamdoud, Haddou, Meftah, Zeghdoud, Metref, Doucouré (substituted off) 83' (Ali Hadji, (substituted on) 83'), Dziri (substituted off) 63' (Belkheïr, (substituted on) 63'), Eneramo, Achiou, Ghazi.	Report	Daham 26', 61' Benfissa, Amrane (substituted off) 83' (Benamrane, (substituted on) 83'), Babouche, Bouacida, Coulibaly, Dellalou, Belaïd, Diakité, Deham (substituted off) 72' (Maouche, (substituted on) 72'), Chaouch, Benali (substituted off) 90' (Badji, (substituted on) 90').	Stadium: Stade 5 Juillet 1962; Referee: Mohamed Kestali; Assistant referees: Bechraïr, Smara

14 April 2005 Round 24	GC Mascara	1–1	USM Alger	Mascara
	Saihi 84' Mokdat, Akriche, Dahmane, Boussada (substituted off) 46' (Yacine Amaouche, (substituted on) 46'), El Hadjari, Benabila, Boukarine, Guessoum, Said Saihi, Yessad, Zougagh.		Eneramo 73' Abdouni, Deghmani, Zeghdoud, Haddou, Djahnine, Ghazi, Dziri, Hocine Achiou, Doucouré, Belkheïr, Eneramo.	Stadium: Stade de l'Unité Africaine; Referee: Fouad Djarbouaâ; Assistant referees: Chaoui, Rebaï

18 April 2005 Round 25	USM Alger	3–2	ES Sétif	Bologhine
	Benchergui 15', 68'; Ghazi 45' Belmellat, Deghmani, Haddou, Djahnine, Ghazi, Meftah, Metref, Dziri, Hocine Achiou (substituted off) 82' (Belkheïr, (substituted on) 82'), Benchergui, Doucouré.		Sessay 46', 90' Haouchi, Bachir Bensaid, Khaled, Madoui, Messali, Lahlou, Torchi (substituted off) 82' (Doumbia, (substituted on) 82'), Benchaïra, Hadj Aïssa (substituted off) 70' (Boussouar, (substituted on) 70'), Bouras (substituted off) 46' (Derradj, (substituted on) 46'), Roberts.	Stadium: Omar Hamadi Stadium; Attendance: 0 (close doors); Referee: Abdelkader Abed; Assistant referees: Ouadeh, Haïmoudi

16 May 2005 Round 26	ASO Chlef	1–2	USM Alger	Chlef
	N'diaye 20' Hadjaoui, Belahouel, Cheklam (substituted off) 75' (Messaoud, (substituted on) 75'), Kerrache, Mekioui (substituted off) 79' (Tamoura, (substituted on) 79'), Zaoui, Balbone, Abbou, Zaouche, Boutouba (substituted off) 56' (Benaboura, (substituted on) 56'), N'Diaye.		Benchergui 29'; Metref 90' Belmellat, Deghmani, Hamdoud, Haddou, Besseghier, Karim Achiou, Djahnine, Ghazi, Metref, Benchergui (substituted off) 44' (Doucouré, (substituted on) 44'), Eneramo.	Stadium: Stade Mohamed Boumezrag; Referee: Abdelhamid Aouiti; Assistant referees: Bouziani, Kaddaoui

26 May 2005 Round 27	USM Alger	4–1	USM Blida	Bologhine
	Dziri 30', 90'; Doucouré 45'; Haddou 57' Zemmamouche, Hamdoud (substituted off) 71' (Besseghier, (substituted on) 71' (substituted off) 84', Belkheïr, (substituted on) 84'), Zeghdoud, Haddou, Djahnine, Ghazi (substituted off) 82' (Deghmani, (substituted on) 82'), Meftah, Metref, Dziri, Achiou, Doucouré.		Zmit 65' Boulifa, Samir Galoul, Belouahem, Diss, Tall, Abdelkader Benayada, Seghir, Zmit, Mehdaoui (substituted off) 59' (Bouguèche, (substituted on) 59'), Badache (substituted off) 69' (Rebih, (substituted on) 69'), Touil.	Stadium: Omar Hamadi Stadium; Referee: Mustapha Ferradi; Assistant referees: Sedrati, Benlakhal

2 June 2005 Round 28	NA Hussein Dey	1–2	USM Alger	Bologhine
	Gana 61' Ousserir, Slatni, Amirat, Laïfaoui (substituted off) 73' (Chaâbane, (substituted on) 73'), Kabri, Abdeslam, Messas, Gana, Alliche (substituted off) 85' (Meghraoui, (substituted on) 85'), Bendebka, Ouichaoui (substituted off) 50' (Cheraïtia, (substituted on) 50').	Report	Khemissa 39'; Benchergui 77' Zememouche, Siahi (substituted off) 75' (Belhadi, (substituted on) 75'), Metref, Deghmani, Meftah, Djahnine, Ali Hadji (substituted off) 73' (Benchergui, (substituted on) 73'), Khemissa, Eneramo, Belkheir (substituted off) 86' (Mekkaoui, (substituted on) 86'), Doucouré.	Stadium: Omar Hamadi Stadium; Referee: Rachid Gasmi; Assistant referees: Hanifi, Kebaïli

9 June 2005 Round 29	MC Oran	2–1	USM Alger	Oran
	Benzerga 30', 42' (pen.) Smahi, Binya, Ouasti, Zidane, Bendida, Kechamli, Boudia, Benatia, Benzerga (substituted off) 69' (Meddahi, (substituted on) 69'), Berradja (substituted off) 90' (Zerrouki, (substituted on) 90'), Chaïb (substituted off) 59' (Serradj, (substituted on) 59').		Khemissa 80' Zemmamouche, Hamdoud, Siahi (substituted off) 67' (Belhadi, (substituted on) 67'), Zeghdoud, Khemissa (substituted off) 86' (Hamraoui, (substituted on) 86'), Meftah, Metref, Doucouré, Ali Hadji, Belkheïr (substituted off) 81' (Kab, (substituted on) 81'), Eneramo.	Stadium: Habib Bouakeul Stadium; Referee: Mohamed Abdessamad; Assistant referees: Mezroua, Ourari

13 June 2005 Round 30	USM Alger	4–1	OMR El Annasser	Bologhine
	Eneramo 21', 35', 39', 63' Zemammouche, Deghmani, Meftah, Zeghdoud (c), Haddou, Ali Hadji (substituted off) 81' (Achiou K., (substituted on) 81'), Djahnine (substituted off) 78' (Benchergui, (substituted on) 78'), Metref, Belkheïr (substituted off) 78' (Besseghir, (substituted on) 78'), Doucouré, Eneramo.	Report	Hemani 39' Bentalaâ, Lamri, Chakir, Bounekdja, Brakni (substituted off) 46' (Ouahla, (substituted on) 46'), Aksas, Khelidi, Massouenga, Hemani (substituted off) 68' (Boutaleb, (substituted on) 68'), Rahmouni (substituted off) 80' (Derrag, (substituted on) 80'), Bagamboula.	Stadium: Omar Hamadi Stadium; Referee: Mohamed Amine Benaissa; Assistant referees: Djezzar, Chettih

=== Algerian Cup ===
3 January 2005 Round of 64	MC Oran	1–0	USM Alger	Chlef
	Benzerga 22' (pen.) Ouamane, Serradj, Hamidi, Zidane, Sifaoui, Kechamli, Amhis (Daoud Sofiane), Chaieb, Berradja (Benzerga II), Benzerga, Bermati (Chérif El Ouazani).	Report	Abdouni, Hamdoud, Aribi (Metref), Zaghdoud Djahnine, Ammour (Besseghir), Dziri, Achiou, Bourahli, Haddou, Benchergui (Belkheir).	Stadium: Stade Mohamed Boumezrag; Referee: Mohamed Amine Benaissa; Assistant referees: Bencheikh, Bourouis

=== Champions League ===
==== Group stage ====
Pos	Team	Pld	W	D	L	GF	GA	GD	Pts	Qualification
1	(Tunisia) ES Tunis	6	4	0	2	12	7	+5	8	Advance to knockout stage
2	(Senegal) Jeanne d'Arc	6	3	2	1	8	9	−1	8	Advance to knockout stage
3	(Algeria) USM Alger	6	2	1	3	8	8	0	5	
4	(South Africa) Supersport United	6	1	1	4	5	9	−4	3	

Rules for classification: Group stage tiebreakers

11 July 2004 1	ASC Jeanne d'Arc (Senegal)	2–1	(Algeria) USM Alger	Dakar, Senegal
17:00	N'Diaye 30'; Diarra 80'		Diallo 73'	Stadium: Stade Demba Diop; Referee: Evene Divine Raphael (Cameroon)

23 July 2004 2	USM Alger (Algeria)	2–1	(South Africa) Supersport United	Algiers, Algeria
	Diallo 34', 90+4'		Raselemane 84'	Stadium: Stade 5 Juillet 1962; Referee: Mohamed Guezzaz (Morocco)

6 August 2004 3	Espérance de Tunis (Tunisia)	2–1	(Algeria) USM Alger	Tunis, Tunisia
20:00	Zitouni 23', 67'		Dziri 57'	Stadium: Stade El Menzah; Referee: Aboubacar Sharaf (Ivory Coast)

10 September 2004 4	USM Alger (Algeria)	3–0	(Tunisia) Espérance de Tunis	Algiers, Algeria
	Bourahli 15', 55'; Diallo 50'			Stadium: Stade 5 Juillet 1962; Referee: Chukwujekwu Chukwudi (Nigeria)

25 September 2004 5	USM Alger (Algeria)	1–1	(Senegal) ASC Jeanne d'Arc	Blida, Algeria
18:00	Diallo 72'		N'Doye 14'	Stadium: Stade Mustapha Tchaker; Referee: Coffi Codjia (Benin)

17 October 2004 6	Supersport United (South Africa)	2–0	(Algeria) USM Alger	Pretoria, South Africa
	Mokoro 77'; Mahlangu 86'			Stadium: Loftus Versfeld Stadium

=== Champions League ===
==== First round ====
6 March 2005 First leg	Olympic Azzaweya (Libya)	0–2	(Algeria) USM Alger	Zawiya, Libya
			54', 60' Ammour	Stadium: Olympic Stadium; Referee: Meghouani, El Hichami, Saâdallah (Tunisia)

18 March 2005 Second leg	USM Alger (Algeria)	5–0	(Libya) Olympic Azzaweya	Algiers, Algeria
	Doucoure 8', 38'; Belkheïr 85', 90'; Eneramo 69'			Stadium: Stade Omar Hammadi; Referee: Ould Mohamed Samba (Mauritania)

==== Second round ====
8 April 2005 First leg	USM Alger (Algeria)	0–1	(Egypt) Al Ahly SC	Algiers, Algeria
	Abdouni, Djahnine, Haddou, Deghmani (substituted off) 70' (Ammour, (substituted on) 70'), Zeghdoud, Mahieddine Meftah, Ghazi, Dziri (substituted off) 86' (Ali Hadji, (substituted on) 86'), Eneramo, Doucoure (substituted off) 78' (Belkheïr, (substituted on) 78'), Achiou		6' Barakat El Hadary, El-Shater, Imad Essayed, Gomaa (substituted off) 84' (Rami Adel, (substituted on) 84'), Abdel Fateh Saadi, Gilberto, Barakat, Abou El Yazid, Hacen Mustapha, Aboutrika (substituted off) 90+4' (Mohamed Salem, (substituted on) 90+4'), Moteab (substituted off) 74' (Ahmed Hassan, (substituted on) 74')	Stadium: Stade Omar Hammadi; Referee: Chelmani Abdelhalim (Libya)

22 April 2005 Second leg	Al Ahly SC (Egypt)	2–2	(Algeria) USM Alger	Cairo, Egypt
	El-Nahhas 45'; Moteab 55'		41' Achiou; 96' (pen.) Hamdoud	Stadium: Arab Contractors Stadium; Referee: Abderrahmane Khaled (Sudan)

=== CAF Confederation Cup ===
==== Play-off round ====
6 May 2005 First leg	USM Alger (Algeria)	1–1	(Tunisia) AS Marsa	Algiers, Algeria
	Achiou 90'	Report	El Hirèch 39'	Stadium: Stade 5 Juillet 1962; Referee: Coffi Codjia (Benin)

21 May 2005 Second leg	AS Marsa (Tunisia)	1–1 (5–4 p)	(Algeria) USM Alger	La Marsa, Tunisia
	Hireche 70'		Doucouré 45'	Stadium: Stade Abdelaziz Chtioui; Referee: Essam Abdel-Fatah (Egypt)
	Penalties
	Anis Jerbi (penalty scored); Abdelkarim Bouguerra (penalty scored); Jilani Boussif (penalty scored); Zoubaier Khemila (penalty scored); Zied Hammami (penalty scored)		(penalty scored) Zeghdoud; (penalty missed) Hamdoud; (penalty scored) Metref; (penalty scored) Ghazi; (penalty scored) Dziri

== Squad information ==
=== Playing statistics ===
Appearances (Apps.) numbers are for appearances in competitive games only including sub appearances
Red card numbers denote: Numbers in parentheses represent red cards overturned for wrongful dismissal.

No.	Nat.	Player	Division 1				Algerian Cup				CAF Champions League				CAF Confederation Cup				Total			
No.	Nat.	Player	GS	Goal	Booked	Sent off (straight red)	GS	Goal	Booked	Sent off (straight red)	GS	Goal	Booked	Sent off (straight red)	GS	Goal	Booked	Sent off (straight red)	GS	Goal	Booked	Sent off (straight red)
Goalkeepers
24	(Algeria)	Farid Belmellat	3								1				1				5			
25	(Algeria)	Merouane Abdouni	23		1		1		1		9				1				33		2	
27	(Algeria)	Mohamed Lamine Zemmamouche	4		1														4		1	
Defenders
2	(Algeria)	Mohamed Hamdoud	25	3	5	1	1		1		8+1	1	1		1				35+1	4	7	1
3	(Algeria)	Tarek Ghoul	0+1								1								1+1			
4	(Algeria)	Salim Aribi	9		3		1				2			1					12		3	1
5	(Algeria)	Mounir Zeghdoud	22		4		1				10				2		1		35		5	
12	(Algeria)	Youcef Siahi	2		1														2		1	
17	(Algeria)	Moulay Haddou	26+2	3	1		1				9+1				2				38+3	3	1	
18	(Algeria)	Rabah Deghmani	20+1		3						6		1		1				27+1		4	
20	(Algeria)	Mahieddine Meftah	17+5		9	1					7		2	1	2				26+5		11	1
29	(Algeria)	Abdelkader Besseghir	8+11	1			0+1				1+3								9+15	1		
	(Algeria)	Mohamed Belhadi	0+2																0+2			
	(Algeria)	Yacine Hamraoui	0+1																0+1			
	(Algeria)	Karim Achiou	0+1																0+1			
	(Algeria)	Zineddine Mekkaoui	0+1																0+1			
Midfielders
6	(Algeria)	Farid Djahnine	19+1	2	3		1				8+1		2		2				30+2	2	5	
7	(Algeria)	Amar Ammour	19	1			1				5+2	2							25+2	3		
8	(Algeria)	Billel Dziri	24	11	5		1				7+1	1	2		2				34+1	12	7	
9	(Algeria)	Karim Ghazi	12	2	2						4		1		1		1		17	2	4	
10	(Algeria)	Hocine Achiou	18	2	6	1	1		1		10	1	1		2	1		1	31	3	8	2
13	(Algeria)	Mohamed Samir Khemissa	2	2	1														2	2	1	
16	(Algeria)	Lahcène Nazef									1								1			
22	(Burkina Faso)	Hamidou Balbone	3+4	1	1						2+1								5+5	1	1	
26	(Algeria)	Hocine Metref	18+8	3	2		1				3+3				2		1		24+11	3	3	
Forwards
9	(Mali)	Mintou Doucoure	10+3	1							2+1	2			1+1	1			13+5	4		
11	(Algeria)	Issaad Bourahli	12+1	2	1		1				4	2							17+1	4	1	
14	(Algeria)	Mohamed Amine Belkheïr	4+13	3	1		0+1				0+4	2			0+1				5+19	5	1	
15	(Algeria)	Karim Ali Hadji	3+7		1						0+1								3+8		1	
19	(Algeria)	Rabie Benchergui	6+5	6	3		1				0+4				1				8+9	6	3	
23	(Mali)	Mamadou Diallo	10	4	3						6	5							16	10	3	
31	(Nigeria)	Michael Eneramo	10+1	7	5	1					4	1			1			1	15+1	8	5	2
	(Algeria)	Ali Lamine Kab	0+1																0+1			
	(Algeria)	Rafik Deghiche	1+1								0+1								1+2			
Own goals				1				0				0				0				1		
Totals				54	62	4		0	3	0		17	10	2		2	3	2		73	78	8

=== Goalscorers ===
Includes all competitive matches. The list is sorted alphabetically by surname when total goals are equal.

No.	Nat.	Player	Pos.	D1	AC	CL1	C3	TOTAL
8	(Algeria)	Billel Dziri	MF	11	0	0	0	11
31	(Nigeria)	Michael Eneramo	FW	7	0	1	0	8
19	(Algeria)	Rabie Benchergui	FW	7	0	0	0	7
2	(Algeria)	Mohamed Hamdoud	DF	4	0	1	0	5
23	(Mali)	Mamadou Diallo	FW	4	0	0	0	4
14	(Algeria)	Mohamed Amine Belkheïr	FW	2	0	2	0	4
17	(Algeria)	Moulay Haddou	DF	3	0	0	0	3
-	(Algeria)	Hocine Metref	MF	3	0	0	0	3
10	(Algeria)	Hocine Achiou	MF	2	0	0	1	3
9	(Mali)	Mintou Doucoure	FW	1	0	1	1	3
7	(Algeria)	Amar Ammour	MF	1	0	2	0	3
6	(Algeria)	Farid Djahnine	MF	2	0	0	0	2
-	(Algeria)	Mohamed Samir Khemissa	FW	2	0	0	0	2
29	(Algeria)	Abdelkader Besseghir	DF	1	0	0	0	1
-	(Burkina Faso)	Hamidou Balbone	FW	1	0	0	0	1
-	(Algeria)	Karim Ghazi	MF	1	0	0	0	1
Own Goals				1	0	0	0	1
Totals				54	0	9	2	66

=== Clean sheets ===
Includes all competitive matches.

No.	Nat	Name	N 1	AC	CL 1	CC 3	Total
24	(Algeria)	Farid Belmellat	1	0	0	0	1
27	(Algeria)	Lamine Zemmamouche	0	0	0	0	0
25	(Algeria)	Merouane Abdouni	9	0	2	0	11
		TOTALS	10	0	2	0	12
