= 2005 CAF Champions League final =

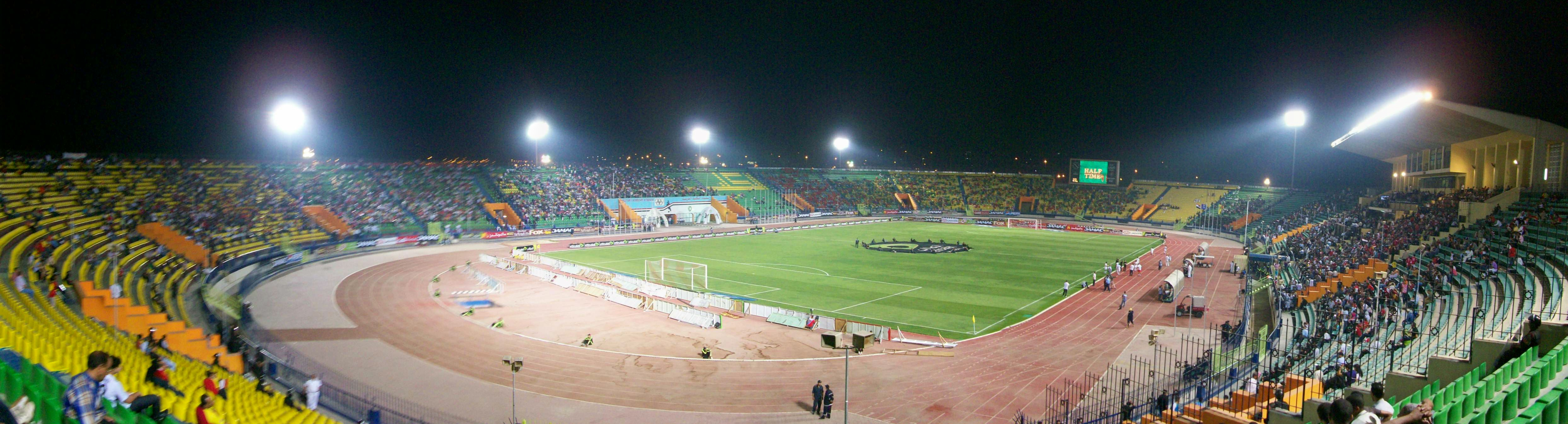
- Cairo Military Academy Stadium hosted the podium where Al Ahly lifted the trophy
- Event: 2005 CAF Champions League
Étoile du Sahel	Al Ahly
(Tunisia)	(Egypt)
0	3

First leg
Étoile du Sahel	Al Ahly
0	0
- Date: 28 October 2005
- Venue: Stade Olympique de Sousse, Sousse
- Referee: Abderrahim El Arjoun (Morocco)
- Attendance: 20,000

Second Leg
Al Ahly	Étoile du Sahel
3	0
- Date: 12 November 2005
- Venue: Cairo Military Academy Stadium, Cairo
- Referee: Lassina Paré (Burkina Faso)
- Attendance: 35,000

The 2005 CAF Champions League final was a football tie held over two legs in December 2005 between Al Ahly, and Étoile du Sahel.

== Qualified teams ==
In the following table, finals until 1996 were in the African Cup of Champions Club era, since 1997 were in the CAF Champions League era.

Team	Region	Previous finals appearances (bold indicates winners)
(Tunisia) Étoile du Sahel	UNAF (North Africa)	2004
(Egypt) Al Ahly	UNAF (North Africa)	**1982**, 1983, **1987**, **2001**

== Background ==
Al Ahly reached a total of four finals, winning three (1982, 1987, 2001) and losing one (1983). Étoile du Sahel reached the second consecutive final in his history after they lost against Enyimba in the previous edition 2004.

Both teams qualified as winners of their groups. Both teams also qualified for the semifinals on the second-last matchday. In the semifinals Étoile du Sahel defeated the Moroccan side Raja Casablanca 2–0 on aggregate, after winning twice with the same result (1–0): the first leg in Casablanca, and the second leg in Sousse. Al Ahly faced his compatriot Zamalek winning the first leg (2–1) and the second leg (2–0) after playing the two matches in Cairo.

== Venues ==
=== Stade Olympique de Sousse ===
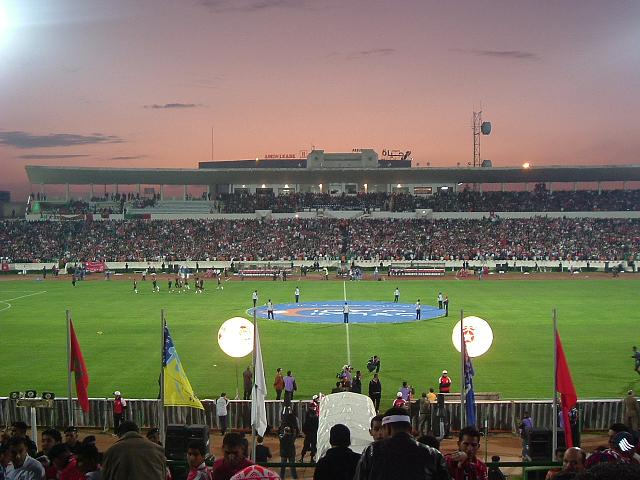
Stade Olympique in Sousse, Tunisia hosted the first leg.

Stade olympique de Sousse is a multi-purpose stadium in Sousse, Tunisia. It is used by the football team Étoile du Sahel, and was used for the 2004 African Cup of Nations. The stadium holds 28,000 people. It hosts within it the meetings played by the football team of the city: Étoile sportive du Sahel (ESS).

For many decades, Sousse footballers knew only the clay surfaces and knew the turf surfaces only when the stadium was inaugurated with an initial capacity of 10,000 places. It passes over the years to 15,000 seats and is then expanded again on the occasion of the 1994 African Cup of Nations with 6,000 additional seats to reach a capacity of 21,000 seats; A luminous panel is installed at the same time. The last expansion was carried out in 1999 to bring the capacity of the stadium to 28,000 seats for the 2001 Mediterranean Games, a reorganization of the gallery of honor was carried out, from a capacity of 70 to 217 places.

It hosted 1977 FIFA World Youth Championship, 1994 African Cup of Nations, 2001 Mediterranean Games and 2004 African Cup of Nations.

=== Cairo Military Academy Stadium ===
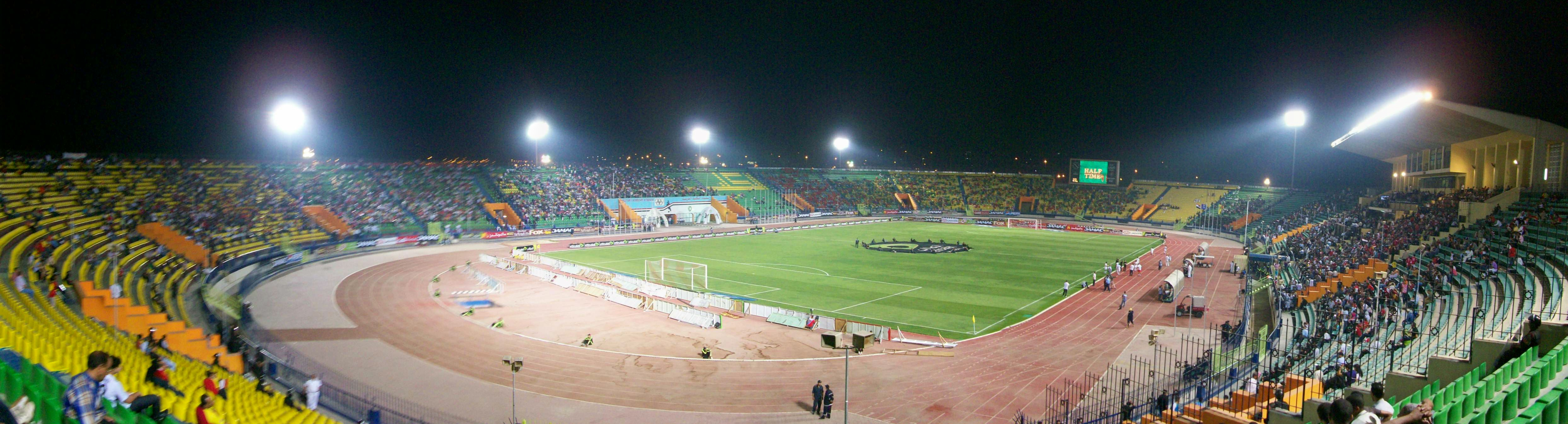
Military Academy Stadium in Cairo, Egypt hosted the second leg.

Cairo Military Academy Stadium is located in Cairo, Egypt and has a total capacity of 28,500.

Seven miles up the road from Cairo International Stadium, heading for Cairo International Airport, there is the Cairo Military Academy Stadium at the far end of Orouba Street in the north-eastern Heliopolis district of Cairo.

It was built in 1989 for the use of military teams and students at the military academy. The ground accommodated home games of Al Ahly and Zamalek during the refurbishing of the Cairo International Stadium and occasionally still serves to stage matches of the old foes.

Al Ahly was forced to move out of its usual stadium, that is, the Cairo International Stadium, due to the work that started in it because of Egypt organizing the 2006 Africa Cup of Nations after three months, it underwent a major renovation, and was brought up to 21st century world standard along with all its multi-game Olympic facilities.

== Road to final ==
(Tunisia) Étoile du Sahel				Round	(Egypt) Al Ahly			
Opponent	Agg.	1st leg	2nd leg	Qualifying rounds	Opponent	Agg.	1st leg	2nd leg
(Senegal) AS Douanes	3–1	0–0 (A)	3–1 (H)	First round	(Uganda) Villa SC	6–0	0–0 (A)	6–0 (H)
(Morocco) FAR Rabat	2–1	0–1 (A)	2–0 (H)	Second round	(Algeria) USM Alger	3–2	1–0 (A)	2–2 (H)
Opponent	Result			Group stage	Opponent	Result		
(Tunisia) ES Tunis	0–0 (H)			Matchday 1	(Morocco) Raja Casablanca	1–0 (H)		
(Egypt) Zamalek	1–1 (A)			Matchday 2	(Nigeria) Enyimba	1–0 (A)		
(Ivory Coast) ASEC Mimosas	1–1 (A)			Matchday 3	(South Africa) Ajax Cape Town	2–0 (H)		
(Ivory Coast) ASEC Mimosas	2–1 (H)			Matchday 4	(South Africa) Ajax Cape Town	0–0 (A)		
(Tunisia) ES Tunis	1–1 (A)			Matchday 5	(Morocco) Raja Casablanca	1–1 (A)		
(Egypt) Zamalek	2–1 (H)			Matchday 6	(Nigeria) Enyimba	2–1 (H)		
Group B Winner: Pos / Team / Pld / W / D / L / GF / GA / GD / Pts / Qualification; **1** / (Tunisia) Étoile du Sahel / **6** / **2** / **4** / **0** / **8** / **6** / **+2** / **10** / **Advance to knockout stage**; 2 / (Egypt) Zamalek / 6 / 2 / 3 / 1 / 8 / 7 / +1 / **9** / **Advance to knockout stage**; 3 / (Ivory Coast) ASEC Mimosas / 6 / 1 / 3 / 2 / 5 / 6 / −1 / **6**; 4 / (Tunisia) Espérance de Tunis / 6 / 0 / 4 / 2 / 3 / 5 / −2 / **4**; Source:				Final standings	Group A Winner: Pos / Team / Pld / W / D / L / GF / GA / GD / Pts / Qualification; **1** / (Egypt) Al Ahly / **6** / **4** / **2** / **0** / **7** / **2** / **+5** / **14** / **Advance to knockout stage**; 2 / (Morocco) Raja Casablanca / 6 / 2 / 2 / 2 / 6 / 5 / +1 / **8** / **Advance to knockout stage**; 3 / (Nigeria) Enyimba / 6 / 2 / 1 / 3 / 6 / 5 / +1 / **7**; 4 / (South Africa) Ajax Cape Town / 6 / 0 / 3 / 3 / 2 / 9 / −7 / **3**; Source:			
Opponent	Agg.	1st leg	2nd leg	Knock-out stage	Opponent	Agg.	1st leg	2nd leg
(Morocco) Raja Casablanca	2–0	1–0 (A)	1–0 (H)	Semifinals	(Egypt) Zamalek	4–1	2–1 (A)	2–0 (H)

== Format ==
The final was decided over two legs, with aggregate goals used to determine the winner. If the sides were level on aggregate after the second leg, the away goals rule would have been applied, and if still level, the tie would have proceeded directly to a penalty shootout (no extra time is played).

== Matches ==
=== First leg ===
29 October 2005
18:00 GMT

Étoile du Sahel (Tunisia)	0–0	(Egypt) Al Ahly
	[[[Category:All articles with unsourced statements]] Rapport]

Stade Olympique de Sousse, Sousse
Attendance: 25,000
Referee: Abderrahim El Arjoun (Morocco)

**Étoile du Sahel**	**Al Ahly**

GK	1	(Nigeria) Austin Ejide
DF	26	(Tunisia) Saïf Ghezal
DF	7	(Tunisia) Kais Zouaghi
DF	6	(Tunisia) Saber Ben Frej
DF	29	(Tunisia) Lotfi Sallami
DF	25	(Tunisia) Chaker Zouaghi
MF	17	(Tunisia) Marouane Bakri
MF	22	(Tunisia) Ahmed Hammi
MF	8	(Cape Verde) Gilson Silva
MF	23	(Tunisia) Mohamed Jedidi
FW	19	(Nigeria) Emeka Opara	(substituted off) 52'
Substitutes:
FW	2	(Tunisia) Yassine Chikhaoui	(substituted on) 52'	(substituted off) 85'
MF	24	(Tunisia) Mejdi Traoui
MF	10	(Tunisia) Sabeur Trabelsi	(substituted on) 85'
Manager:
(Bosnia and Herzegovina) Mehmed Baždarević

GK	1	(Egypt) Essam El Hadary
DF	16	(Egypt) Emad El Nahhas
DF	7	(Egypt) Ahmad El-Sayed
DF	26	(Egypt) Wael Gomaa
DF	2	(Egypt) Islam El-Shater
DF	14	(Egypt) Hassan Mostafa
MF	17	(Egypt) Mohamed Shawky
MF	12	(Angola) Gilberto
MF	22	(Egypt) Mohamed Aboutrika	(substituted off) 90'
MF	8	(Egypt) Mohamed Barakat
FW	19	(Egypt) Emad Meteb
Substitutes:
FW	2	(Egypt) Osama Hosny	(substituted on) 90'
Manager:
(Portugal) Manuel José

Assistant referees:
Ahmed Belkhater (Morocco)
Mohamed Ayoub (Morocco)
Fourth official:
Chokri Saadallah (Tunisia)

=== Second leg ===
12 November 2005
17:30 GMT

Al Ahly (Egypt)	3–0	(Tunisia) Étoile du Sahel
Aboutrika 20'; Hosny 51'; Barakat 90+2'	[[[Category:All articles with unsourced statements]] Rapport]

Cairo Military Academy Stadium, Cairo
Attendance: 35,000
Referee: Lassina Paré (Burkina Faso)

**Al Ahly**	**Étoile du Sahel**

GK	1	(Egypt) Essam El Hadary
DF	16	(Egypt) Emad El Nahhas
DF	26	(Egypt) Wael Gomaa
DF	5	(Egypt) Ahmad El-Sayed
DF	8	(Egypt) Mohamed Barakat
DF	14	(Egypt) Hassan Mostafa
MF	17	(Egypt) Mohamed Shawky
MF	12	(Angola) Gilberto	(substituted off) 30'
MF	22	(Egypt) Mohamed Aboutrika
MF	13	(Egypt) Emad Meteb	(substituted off) 84'
FW	18	(Egypt) Osama Hosny	(substituted off) 65'
Substitutes:
FW	3	(Egypt) Mohamed Abdelwahab	(substituted on) 30'
FW	2	(Egypt) Islam El-Shater	(substituted on) 65'
FW	2	(Egypt) Hossam Ashour	(substituted on) 84'
Manager:
(Portugal) Manuel José

GK	1	(Nigeria) Austin Ejide
DF	26	(Tunisia) Saïf Ghezal
DF	7	(Tunisia) Kais Zouaghi
DF	6	(Tunisia) Saber Ben Frej
DF	29	(Tunisia) Lotfi Sallami
DF	25	(Tunisia) Chaker Zouaghi
MF	17	(Tunisia) Marouane Bakri
MF	22	(Tunisia) Ahmed Hammi
MF	8	(Cape Verde) Gilson Silva
MF	23	(Tunisia) Mohamed Jedidi	(substituted off) 79'
FW	19	(Nigeria) Emeka Opara	(substituted off) 53'
Substitutes:
FW	2	(Tunisia) Yassine Chikhaoui	(substituted on) 53'
MF	24	(Tunisia) Bassem Ben Nasser
MF	10	(Tunisia) Sabeur Trabelsi	(substituted on) 79'
Manager:
(Bosnia and Herzegovina) Mehmed Baždarević

Assistant referees:
Losséni Paré (Burkina Faso)
Brama Millogo (Burkina Faso)
Fourth official:
Nasser Sadek (Egypt)
