= 2004 CAF Champions League =

Confederation of African Football Champions League

Tournament details
- Dates: 7 March – 12 December
- Teams: 53 (from 52 confederations)

Final positions
- Champions: (Nigeria) Enyimba (2nd title)
- Runners-up: (Tunisia) Étoile du Sahel

Tournament statistics
- Matches played: 102
- Goals scored: 294 (2.88 per match)
- Top scorer(s): (Mali) Mamadou Diallo (10 goals)

The 2004 CAF Champions League was the 40th edition of the CAF Champions League, the Africa's premier club football tournament prize organized by the Confederation of African Football (CAF). Enyimba of Nigeria defeated Étoile du Sahel of Tunisia in the final to win their second title.

== Qualifying rounds ==
=== Preliminary round ===
Team 1	Agg.	Team 2	1st leg	2nd leg
US Stade Tamponnaise (Réunion)	w/o^{1}	(Mauritius) AS Port-Louis 2000	–	–
Supersport United (South Africa)	6–0	(Namibia) FC Civics	5–0	1–0
Saint George (Ethiopia)	2–3	(Sudan) Al-Hilal	1–2	1–1
Ecoredipharm (Madagascar)	0–2	(Seychelles) St.-Michel United	0–0	0–2
Matlama FC (Lesotho)	0–7	(South Africa) Orlando Pirates	0–3	0–4
Simba SC (Tanzania)	2–3	(Zambia) Zanaco FC	1–0	1–3
Bakili Bullets (Malawi)	2–1	(Uganda) Villa SC	2–1	0–0
APR FC (Rwanda)	11–3	(Eritrea) Anseba S.C.	7–1	4–2
Dragons de l'Ouémé (Benin)	1–1 (a)	(Togo) AS Douanes	1–1	0–0
Al Ittihad Tripoli (Libya)	1–2	(Niger) Sahel SC	1–0	0–2
Saint Michel de Ouenzé (Republic of the Congo)	2–2 (4-3 p)	(Gabon) US Bitam	2–0	0–2
ASFA Yennenga (Burkina Faso)	3–2	(Nigeria) Julius Berger	3–2	0–0
Asante Kotoko (Ghana)	w/o^{2}	(Central African Republic) AS Tempête Mocaf	–	–
Armed Forces (The Gambia)	0–6	(Senegal) Jeanne d'Arc	0–3	0–3
AS Vita Club (Democratic Republic of the Congo)	w/o^{2}	(Kenya) Ulinzi Stars	–	–
Stade Malien (Mali)	0–2	(Ghana) Hearts of Oak	0–0	0–2
Atlético Sport Aviação (Angola)	2–1	(Democratic Republic of the Congo) SC Cilu	1–1	1–0
Hassania Agadir (Morocco)	10–0	(Mauritania) ASC Nasr de Sebkha	7–0	3–0^{3}
ASFAG (Guinea)	1–3	(Senegal) ASC Diaraf	0–1	1–2
Amazulu FC (Zimbabwe)	7–4	(Mozambique) Maxaquene	3–1	4–3
Petro Atlético (Angola)	6–2	(Equatorial Guinea) Atlético Malabo	3–1	3–1

^{1} US Stade Tamponnaise refused to participate; they were banned from CAF competitions for two years and fined $3000.
^{2} AS Tempête Mocaf and Ulinzi Stars withdrew before 1st leg.
^{3} ASC Nasr de Sebkha withdrew before the 2nd leg.

=== First round ===
Team 1	Agg.	Team 2	1st leg	2nd leg
AS Port-Louis 2000 (Mauritius)	1–3	(South Africa) Supersport United	1–1	0–2
Al Ahly (Egypt)	0–1	(Sudan) Al-Hilal	0–1	0–0
St.-Michel United (Seychelles)	3–8	(South Africa) Orlando Pirates	2–3	1–5
Zanaco FC (Zambia)	1–1 (5-6 p)	(Malawi) Bakili Bullets	0–1	1–0
Zamalek (Egypt)	4–6	(Rwanda) APR FC	3–2	1–4
Africa Sports National (Ivory Coast)	5–1	(Togo) AS Douanes	4–1	1–0
ES Tunis (Tunisia)	5–0	(Niger) Sahel SC	4–0	1–0
Coton Sport FC (Cameroon)	4–2	(Republic of the Congo) Saint Michel de Ouenzé	4–1	0–1
USM Alger (Algeria)	10–3	(Burkina Faso) ASFA Yennenga	8–1	2–2
ASEC Mimosas (Ivory Coast)	1–1 (a)	(Ghana) Asante Kotoko	1–1	0–0
Raja Casablanca (Morocco)	2–2 (4-5 p)	(Senegal) Jeanne d'Arc	2–0	0–2
Canon Yaoundé (Cameroon)	4–1	(Democratic Republic of the Congo) AS Vita Club	3–0	1–1
Hearts of Oak (Ghana)	5–2	(Angola) Atlético Sport Aviação	4–1	1–1
Étoile du Sahel (Tunisia)	2–0	(Morocco) Hassania Agadir	2–0	0–0
Enyimba (Nigeria)	3–2	(Senegal) ASC Diaraf	3–0	0–2
Amazulu FC (Zimbabwe)	1–2	(Angola) Petro Atlético	0–0	1–2

=== Second round ===
Team 1	Agg.	Team 2	1st leg	2nd leg
Supersport United (South Africa)	2–0	(Sudan) Al-Hilal	2–0	0–0
Orlando Pirates (South Africa)	2–2 (a)	(Malawi) Bakili Bullets	2–1	0–1
APR FC (Rwanda)	1–1 (1-3 p)	(Ivory Coast) Africa Sports National	1–0	0–1
ES Tunis (Tunisia)	3–1	(Cameroon) Coton Sport FC	3–0	0–1
USM Alger (Algeria)	2–2 (3-1 p)	(Ghana) Asante Kotoko	2–0	0–2
Jeanne d'Arc (Senegal)	3–2	(Cameroon) Canon Yaoundé	2–0	1–2
Hearts of Oak (Ghana)	1–1 (4-5 p)	(Tunisia) Étoile du Sahel	1–0	0–1
Enyimba (Nigeria)	3–2	(Angola) Petro Atlético	1–1	2–1

== Group stage ==
Key to colours in group tables
Group winners and runners-up advance to the Knockout stage

=== Group A ===
Pos	Team	Pld	W	D	L	GF	GA	GD	Pts	Qualification	ESS	ENY	AFR	BUL
1	(Tunisia) Étoile du Sahel	6	3	2	1	8	5	+3	8	Advance to knockout stage	—			
2	(Nigeria) Enyimba	6	2	2	2	11	4	+7	6	Advance to knockout stage		—		
3	(Ivory Coast) Africa Sports National	6	2	1	3	6	10	−4	5				—	
4	(Malawi) Bakili Bullets	6	1	3	2	5	11	−6	5					—

=== Group B ===
Pos	Team	Pld	W	D	L	GF	GA	GD	Pts	Qualification	ESP	JEA	USM	SSU
1	(Tunisia) ES Tunis	6	4	0	2	12	7	+5	8	Advance to knockout stage	—	5–0	2–1	2–0
2	(Senegal) Jeanne d'Arc	6	3	2	1	8	9	−1	8	Advance to knockout stage	2–1	—	2–1	2–0
3	(Algeria) USM Alger	6	2	1	3	8	8	0	5		3–0	1–1	—	2–1
4	(South Africa) Supersport United	6	1	1	4	5	9	−4	3		1–2	1–1	2–0	—

Rules for classification: Group stage tiebreakers

== Knockout stage ==
=== Bracket ===
Semi-finals
(Senegal) Jeanne d'Arc	2	0	2
(Tunisia) Étoile du Sahel	1	3	4
(Nigeria) Enyimba (p)	1	1	2 (6)
(Tunisia) ES Tunis	1	1	2 (5)

Final
(Tunisia) Étoile du Sahel	2	1	3 (3)
(Nigeria) Enyimba (p)	1	2	3 (5)

=== Semifinals ===
Team 1	Agg.	Team 2	1st leg	2nd leg
Jeanne d'Arc (Senegal)	2–4	(Tunisia) Étoile du Sahel	2–1	0–3
Enyimba (Nigeria)	2–2 (6-5 p)	(Tunisia) ES Tunis	1–1	1–1

=== Final ===
4 December 2004
17:00 UTC+1

Étoile du Sahel (Tunisia)	2–1	(Nigeria) Enyimba
Mhadhbi 44' (pen.); Traoré 51'		Nwanna 15'

Stade Olympique de Sousse, Sousse
Attendance: 28,000
Referee: Mohamed Benouza (Algeria)
12 December 2004
15:00 UTC+0

Enyimba (Nigeria)	2–1	(Tunisia) Étoile du Sahel
Enyeama 43' (pen.); Ogunbiyi 53'	Report	Zouaghi 63'
Penalties
Ezoba (penalty scored); Aliyu (penalty scored); Ezenwa (penalty scored); Udeh (penalty scored); Yusuf (penalty scored)	5–3	(penalty scored) Miladi; (penalty missed) Ben Frej; (penalty scored) Traoré; (penalty scored) Baya

Nigeria National Stadium, Abuja
Attendance: 60,000
Referee: Coffi Codjia (Benin)

== Best Scorers ==
The top scorers from the 2004 CAF Champions League are as follows:

Rank	Name	Team	Goals
1	(Mali) Mamadou Diallo	(Algeria) USM Alger	10
2	(Tunisia) Ali Zitouni	(Tunisia) ES Tunis	9
3	(Senegal) Lamine Diarra	(Senegal) Jeanne d'Arc	6
3	(Senegal) Makhete Ndiaye	(Senegal) Jeanne d'Arc	6
3	(South Africa) Abram Raselemane	(South Africa) Supersport United	6
6	(Senegal) Dame N'Doye	(Senegal) Jeanne d'Arc	5
6	(South Africa) Benedict Vilakazi	(South Africa) Orlando Pirates	5
8	(Ivory Coast) Blaise Kouassi	(Ivory Coast) Africa Sports	4
8	(Nigeria) Emeka Nwanna	(Nigeria) Enyimba	4
8	(South Africa) Bheka Phakathi	(South Africa) Orlando Pirates	4
8	(Ivory Coast) Kandia Traoré	(Tunisia) Étoile du Sahel	4
8	(Nigeria) Emeka Opara	(Tunisia) Étoile du Sahel	4
