= List of overage players in Olympic football =

This is a list of all-time overage players (also known as wild card players in some countries) in Olympic football since the 1996 tournament.

Since the 1992 tournament, male squads have been required to consist of players under 23 years old; since 1996, a maximum of three players over the age of 23 have been allowed per squad.

Overage players rules in Olympic football have influenced other competitions like Asian Games football, Pan American Games football, and African Games football.

== Africa (CAF) ==
=== Algeria ===
Overage players of Algeria national under-23 football team

Tournament	Player 1	Player 2	Player 3
2016	Abdelghani Demmou (DF)	Sofiane Bendebka (MF)	Baghdad Bounedjah (FW)

=== Cameroon ===
Overage players of Cameroon national under-23 football team

Tournament	Player 1	Player 2	Player 3
2000	Serge Mimpo (DF)	Patrick M'Boma (FW)	did not select
2008	Antonio Ghomsi (DF)	Gustave Bebbe (FW)	did not select

=== Egypt ===
Overage players of Egypt national under-23 football team

Tournament	Player 1	Player 2	Player 3
2012	Ahmed Fathy (DF)	Mohamed Aboutrika (MF)	Emad Moteab (FW)
2020	Mohamed El Shenawy (GK)	Ahmed Hegazi (DF)	Mahmoud Hamdy (DF)
2024	Mohamed Elneny (MF)	Zizo (MF)	did not select

=== Gabon ===
Overage players of Gabon national under-23 football team

Tournament	Player 1	Player 2	Player 3
2012	Didier Ovono (GK)	Bruno Ecuele Manga (DF)	did not select

=== Ghana ===
Overage players of Ghana national under-23 football team

Tournament	Player 1	Player 2	Player 3
1996	Joe Addo (DF)	did not select	
2004	Baffour Gyan (FW)	did not select	

=== Guinea ===
Overage players of Guinea national under-23 football team

Tournament	Player 1	Player 2	Player 3
2024	Amadou Diawara (MF)	Naby Keïta (MF)	Abdoulaye Touré (MF)

=== Ivory Coast ===
Overage players of Ivory Coast national under-23 football team

Tournament	Player 1	Player 2	Player 3
2008	did not select		
2020	Eric Bailly (DF)	Franck Kessié (MF)	Max Gradel (FW)

=== Mali ===
Overage players of Mali national under-23 football team

Tournament	Player 1	Player 2	Player 3
2004	Fousseiny Tangara (GK)	did not select	
2024	Salam Jiddou (MF)	Demba Diallo (FW)	did not select

=== Morocco ===
Overage players of Morocco national under-23 football team

Tournament	Player 1	Player 2	Player 3
2000	El Houssaine Ouchla (DF)	Adel Chbouki (MF)	Salaheddine Bassir (FW)
2004	Nadir Lamyaghri (GK)	Otmane El Assas (MF)	Bouchaib El Moubarki (FW)
2012	Houssine Kharja (MF)	Nordin Amrabat (FW)	did not select
2024	Munir Mohamedi (GK)	Achraf Hakimi (DF)	Soufiane Rahimi (FW)

=== Nigeria ===
Overage players of Nigeria national under-23 football team

Tournament	Player 1	Player 2	Player 3
1996	Uche Okechukwu (DF)	Emmanuel Amunike (MF)	Daniel Amokachi (FW)
2000	Godwin Okpara (DF)	Garba Lawal (MF)	did not select
2008	Peter Odemwingie (FW)	did not select	
2016	Daniel Akpeyi (GK)	Mikel John Obi (MF)	did not select

=== Senegal ===
Overage players of Senegal national under-23 football team

Tournament	Player 1	Player 2	Player 3
2012	Papa Gueye (DF)	Mohamed Diamé (MF)	did not select

=== South Africa ===
Overage players of South Africa national under-23 football team

Tournament	Player 1	Player 2	Player 3
2000	Brian Baloyi (GK)	Dumisa Ngobe (MF)	did not select
2016	Itumeleng Khune (GK)	Eric Mathoho (DF)	did not select
2020	Ronwen Williams (GK)	did not select	

=== Tunisia ===
Overage players of Tunisia national under-23 football team

Tournament	Player 1	Player 2	Player 3
1996	Chokri El Ouaer (GK)	did not select	
2004	Khaled Fadhel (GK)	José Clayton (DF)	Mohamed Jedidi (MF)

== Asia (AFC) ==
=== Australia ===
Overage players of Australia men's national under-23 soccer team

Tournament	Player 1	Player 2	Player 3
1996	Steve Horvat (MF)	Aurelio Vidmar (FW)	did not select
2000	Stan Lazaridis (MF)	Josip Skoko (MF)	Mark Viduka (FW)
2004	Craig Moore (DF)	Tim Cahill (MF)	John Aloisi (FW)
2008	Jade North (DF)	David Carney (MF)	Archie Thompson (FW)
2020	Mitchell Duke (FW)	did not select	

=== China ===
Overage players of China national under-23 football team

Tournament	Player 1	Player 2	Player 3
2008	Li Weifeng (DF)	Zheng Zhi (MF)	Han Peng (FW)

=== Iraq ===
Overage players of Iraq national under-23 football team

Tournament	Player 1	Player 2	Player 3
2004	Haidar Abdul-Jabar (DF)	Abdul-Wahab Abu Al-Hail (MF)	Razzaq Farhan (FW)
2016	Ahmed Ibrahim (DF)	Saad Abdul-Amir (MF)	Hammadi Ahmed (FW)
2024	Saad Natiq (DF)	Ibrahim Bayesh (MF)	Aymen Hussein (FW)

=== Japan ===
Overage players of Japan national under-23 football team

Tournament	Player 1	Player 2	Player 3
1996	did not select		
2000	Seigo Narazaki (GK)	Ryuzo Morioka (DF)	Atsuhiro Miura (MF)
2004	Hitoshi Sogahata (GK)	Shinji Ono (MF)	did not select
2008	did not select		
2012	Maya Yoshida (DF)	Yūhei Tokunaga (DF)	did not select
2016	Hiroki Fujiharu (DF)	Tsukasa Shiotani (DF)	Shinzo Koroki (FW)
2020	Maya Yoshida (DF)	Hiroki Sakai (DF)	Wataru Endo (MF)
2024	did not select		

=== Kuwait ===
Overage players of Kuwait national under-23 football team

Tournament	Player 1	Player 2	Player 3
2000	Jamal Mubarak (DF)	Abdullah Wabran (DF)	Esam Sakeen (MF)

=== Saudi Arabia ===
Overage players of Saudi Arabia national under-23 football team

Tournament	Player 1	Player 2	Player 3
1996	Mohammed Al-Khilaiwi (DF)	Fuad Anwar (MF)	Hamzah Idris Falatah (FW)
2020	Yasser Al-Shahrani (DF)	Salman Al-Faraj (MF)	Salem Al-Dawsari (MF)

=== South Korea ===
Overage players of South Korea national under-23 football team

Tournament	Player 1	Player 2	Player 3
1996	Lee Lim-saeng (DF); Lee Kyung-chun (Note: Lee Lim-saeng was injured in the second match. Reserve player Lee Kyung-chun appeared in the third match.)(DF)	Ha Seok-ju (MF)	Hwang Sun-hong (FW)
2000	Kang Chul (DF)	Kim Sang-sik (DF)	Kim Do-hoon (FW)
2004	Yoo Sang-chul (MF)	Chung Kyung-ho (FW)	did not select
2008	Kim Dong-jin (DF)	Kim Jung-woo (MF)	did not select
2012	Jung Sung-ryong (GK)	Kim Chang-soo (DF)	Park Chu-young (FW)
2016	Jang Hyun-soo (DF)	Suk Hyun-jun (FW)	Son Heung-min (FW)
2020	Park Ji-soo (DF)	Kwon Chang-hoon (MF)	Hwang Ui-jo (FW)

=== United Arab Emirates ===
Overage players of United Arab Emirates national under-23 football team

Tournament	Player 1	Player 2	Player 3
2012	Ali Khasif (GK)	Ismail Al Hammadi (MF)	Ismail Matar (FW)

=== Uzbekistan ===
Overage players of Uzbekistan national under-23 football team

Tournament	Player 1	Player 2	Player 3
2024	Husniddin Aliqulov (DF)	Eldor Shomurodov (FW)	Oston Urunov (FW)

== Europe (UEFA) ==
=== Belarus ===
Overage players of Belarus national under-23 football team

Tournament	Player 1	Player 2	Player 3
2012	Renan Bressan (MF)	Stanislaw Drahun (MF)	Sergei Kornilenko (FW)

=== Belgium ===
Overage players of Belgium national under-21 football team

Tournament	Player 1	Player 2	Player 3
2008	Sepp De Roover (DF)	Maarten Martens (MF)	did not select

=== Czech Republic ===
Overage players of Czech Republic national under-21 football team

Tournament	Player 1	Player 2	Player 3
2000	did not select		

=== Denmark ===
Overage players of Denmark national under-21 football team

Tournament	Player 1	Player 2	Player 3
2016	Edigeison Gomes (DF)	Lasse Vibe (FW)	Emil Larsen (FW)

=== France ===
Overage players of France Olympic football team

Tournament	Player 1	Player 2	Player 3
1996	did not select		
2020	Téji Savanier (MF)	Florian Thauvin (FW)	André-Pierre Gignac (FW)
2024	Loïc Badé (DF)	Alexandre Lacazette (FW)	Jean-Philippe Mateta (FW)

=== Great Britain ===
Overage players of Great Britain Olympic football team

Tournament	Player 1	Player 2	Player 3
2012	(England) Micah Richards (DF)	(Wales) Ryan Giggs (MF)	(Wales) Craig Bellamy (FW)

=== Greece ===
Overage players of Greece national under-23 football team

Tournament	Player 1	Player 2	Player 3
2004	Konstantinos Nebegleras (MF)	Miltiadis Sapanis (MF)	Ieroklis Stoltidis (MF)

=== Germany ===
Overage players of Germany Olympic football team

Tournament	Player 1	Player 2	Player 3
2016	Sven Bender (MF)	Lars Bender (MF)	Nils Petersen (FW)
2020	Maximilian Arnold (MF)	Max Kruse (FW)	did not select

=== Hungary ===
Overage players of Hungary national under-21 football team

Tournament	Player 1	Player 2	Player 3
1996	did not select		

=== Israel ===
Overage players of Israel Olympic football team

Tournament	Player 1	Player 2	Player 3
2024	Sean Goldberg (DF)	Omri Gandelman (MF)	did not select

=== Italy ===
Overage players of Italy national under-21 football team

Tournament	Player 1	Player 2	Player 3
1996	Gianluca Pagliuca (GK)	Massimo Crippa (MF)	Marco Branca (FW)
2000	did not select		
2004	Matteo Ferrari (DF)	Andrea Pirlo (MF)	did not select
2008	Tommaso Rocchi (FW)	did not select	

=== Netherlands ===
Overage players of Netherlands national under-21 football team

Tournament	Player 1	Player 2	Player 3
2008	Kew Jaliens (DF)	Gerald Sibon (FW)	Roy Makaay (FW)

=== Portugal ===
Overage players of Portugal Olympic football team

Tournament	Player 1	Player 2	Player 3
1996	Rui Bento (DF)	Paulo Alves (FW)	Capucho (FW)
2004	Nuno Frechaut (DF)	Fernando Meira (DF)	Luís Boa Morte (FW)
2016	André Martins (MF)	Sérgio Oliveira (MF)	Salvador Agra (FW)

=== Romania ===
Overage players of Romania national under-21 football team

Tournament	Player 1	Player 2	Player 3
2020	Florin Ștefan (DF)	did not select	

=== Serbia ===
Overage players of Serbia national under-21 football team

Tournament	Player 1	Player 2	Player 3
2004	did not select		
2008	Vladimir Stojković (GK)	Aleksandar Živković (MF)	Miljan Mrdaković (FW)

=== Slovakia ===
Overage players of Slovakia national under-21 football team

Tournament	Player 1	Player 2	Player 3
2000	Martin Lipčák (GK)	Radoslav Kráľ (DF)	Michal Pančík (MF)

=== Spain ===
Overage players of Spain national under-23 football team

Tournament	Player 1	Player 2	Player 3
1996	did not select		
2000	did not select		
2012	Juan Mata (MF)	Javi Martínez (MF)	Adrián López (FW)
2020	Mikel Merino (MF)	Dani Ceballos (MF)	Marco Asensio (FW)
2024	Juan Miranda (DF)	Sergio Gómez (FW)	Abel Ruiz (FW)

=== Sweden ===
Overage players of Sweden national under-23 football team

Tournament	Player 1	Player 2	Player 3
2016	Alexander Milošević (DF)	Abdul Khalili (MF)	Astrit Ajdarević (MF)

=== Switzerland ===
Overage players of Switzerland national under-23 football team

Tournament	Player 1	Player 2	Player 3
2012	Diego Benaglio (GK)	Timm Klose (DF)	Xavier Hochstrasser (MF)

=== Ukraine ===
Overage players of Ukraine national under-23 football team

Tournament	Player 1	Player 2	Player 3
2024	Maksym Talovyerov (DF)	Dmytro Kryskiv (MF)	did not select

== North America, Central America and Caribbean (CONCACAF) ==
=== Costa Rica ===
Overage players of Costa Rica national under-23 football team

Tournament	Player 1	Player 2	Player 3
2004	Whayne Wilson (FW)	did not select	

=== Dominican Republic ===
Overage players of Dominican Republic national under-23 football team

Tournament	Player 1	Player 2	Player 3
2024	Luiyi de Lucas (DF)	Heinz Mörschel (MF)	did not select

=== Honduras ===
Overage players of Honduras national under-23 football team

Tournament	Player 1	Player 2	Player 3
2000	did not select		
2008	Samuel Caballero (DF)	Emil Martínez (MF)	Carlos Pavón (FW)
2012	Maynor Figueroa (DF)	Roger Espinoza (MF)	Jerry Bengtson (FW)
2016	Johnny Palacios (DF)	Romell Quioto (FW)	did not select
2020	Brayan Moya (MF)	Jorge Benguché (FW)	did not select

=== Mexico ===
Overage players of Mexico national under-23 football team

Tournament	Player 1	Player 2	Player 3
1996	Jorge Campos (GK)	Claudio Suárez (DF)	Luis García (MF)
2004	Israel López (MF)	Antônio Naelson "Sinha" (MF)	Omar Bravo (FW)
2012	José Jesús Corona (GK)	Carlos Salcido (DF)	Oribe Peralta (FW)
2016	Alfredo Talavera (GK)	Jorge Torres Nilo (DF)	Oribe Peralta (FW)
2020	Guillermo Ochoa (GK)	Luis Romo (MF)	Henry Martín (FW)

=== United States ===
Overage players of United States men's national under-23 soccer team

Tournament	Player 1	Player 2	Player 3
1996	Kasey Keller (GK)	Alexi Lalas (DF)	did not select
2000	Brad Friedel (GK)	Jeff Agoos (DF)	Frankie Hejduk (MF)
2008	Brad Guzan (GK)	Michael Parkhurst (DF)	Brian McBride (FW)
2024	Miles Robinson (DF)	Walker Zimmerman (DF)	Djordje Mihailovic (MF)

== Oceania (OFC) ==
=== Fiji ===
Overage players of Fiji national under-23 football team

Tournament	Player 1	Player 2	Player 3
2016	Simione Tamanisau (GK)	Alvin Singh (DF)	Roy Krishna (FW)

=== New Zealand ===
Overage players of New Zealand men's national under-23 football team

Tournament	Player 1	Player 2	Player 3
2008	Ryan Nelsen (DF)	Simon Elliott (MF)	Chris Killen (FW)
2012	Ryan Nelsen (DF)	Michael McGlinchey (MF)	Shane Smeltz (FW)
2020	Winston Reid (DF)	Michael Boxall (DF)	Chris Wood (FW)
2024	Michael Boxall (DF)	Joe Bell (MF)	Sarpreet Singh (MF)

== South America (CONMEBOL) ==
=== Argentina ===
Overage players of Argentina national under-23 football team

Tournament	Player 1	Player 2	Player 3
1996	José Chamot (DF)	Roberto Sensini (DF)	Diego Simeone (MF)
2004	Roberto Ayala (DF)	Gabriel Heinze (DF)	Kily González (MF)
2008	Nicolás Pareja (DF)	Javier Mascherano (MF)	Juan Román Riquelme (MF)
2016	Gerónimo Rulli (GK)	Víctor Cuesta (DF)	did not select
2020	Jeremías Ledesma (GK)	did not select	
2024	Gerónimo Rulli (GK)	Nicolás Otamendi (DF)	Julián Álvarez (FW)

=== Brazil ===
Overage players of Brazil national under-23 football team

Tournament	Player 1	Player 2	Player 3
1996	Aldair (DF)	Rivaldo (MF)	Bebeto (FW)
2000	did not select		
2008	Thiago Silva (DF)	Ronaldinho (MF)	did not select
2012	Thiago Silva (DF)	Marcelo (DF)	Hulk (FW)
2016	Weverton (GK)	Renato Augusto (MF)	Neymar (FW)
2020	Aderbar Santos (GK)	Diego Carlos (DF)	Dani Alves (DF)

=== Chile ===
Overage players of Chile Olympic football team

Tournament	Player 1	Player 2	Player 3
2000	Nelson Tapia (GK)	Pedro Reyes (DF)	Iván Zamorano (FW)

=== Colombia ===
Overage players of Colombia national under-23 football team

Tournament	Player 1	Player 2	Player 3
2016	William Tesillo (DF)	Dorlan Pabón (FW)	Teófilo Gutiérrez (FW)

=== Paraguay ===
Overage players of Paraguay national under-23 football team

Tournament	Player 1	Player 2	Player 3
2004	Carlos Gamarra (DF)	Julio César Enciso (MF)	José Cardozo (FW)
2024	Gatito Fernández (GK)	Fabián Balbuena (DF)	Ángel Cardozo Lucena (MF)

=== Uruguay ===
Overage players of Uruguay national under-23 football team

Tournament	Player 1	Player 2	Player 3
2012	Egidio Arévalo (MF)	Edinson Cavani (FW)	Luis Suárez (FW)
