= Ajibade =

- Gender: Male
- Language: Yoruba

Origin
- Origin: Nigeria
- Meaning: One who wakes up to meet royalty.
- Region of origin: South western Nigeria

Ajibade (audio) is a common Nigerian given name of Yoruba origin. Ajibade means "one who wakes up to meet royalty".

== People ==
Notable people with the name include:

=== As a surname ===
- Kunle Ajibade (born 1958), Nigerian writer, author and journalist
- Yemi Ajibade (1929–2013), Nigerian playwright
- Gbenro Ajibade, Nigerian actor
- Tosin Ajibade (born 1987), Nigerian blogger
- Oluwatosin Oluwole Ajibade (born 1991), Nigerian singer
- Rasheedat Ajibade (born 1999), Nigerian footballer

=== As a given name ===
- Ajibade Babalade (1972–2020), Nigerian footballer
- Ajibade Gbadegesin Ogunoye III (born 1966), Nigerian monarch
- Ajibade Omolade (born 1984), Nigerian footballer
- Sunday Ajibade Adenihun, Nigerian governor
