= Football at the 2004 Summer Olympics – Men's tournament =

2004 Men's Olympic Football Tournament

Tournament details
- Host country: Greece
- Dates: 11–28 August
- Teams: 16 (from 6 confederations)
- Venues: 6 (in 5 host cities)

Final positions
- Champions: Argentina (1st title)
- Runners-up: Paraguay
- Third place: Italy
- Fourth place: Iraq

Tournament statistics
- Matches played: 32
- Goals scored: 101 (3.16 per match)
- Attendance: 401,415 (12,544 per match)
- Top scorer(s): (Argentina) Carlos Tevez (8 goals)

The men's football tournament at the 2004 Summer Olympics was held in Athens and four other cities in Greece from 11 to 28 August. The tournament featured 16 men's national teams from the six continental confederations. The 16 teams were drawn into four groups of four, in which each team would play each of the others once. At the end of the group stage, the top two teams advanced to the knockout stage, beginning with the quarter-finals and culminating with the final at Athens Olympic Stadium on 28 August 2004.

== Qualification ==
The following 16 teams qualified for the 2004 Olympics football tournament.

Means of qualification	Berths	Qualified
Host nation	1	Greece
2004 UEFA European Under-21 Football Championship	3	Italy (winner); Serbia and Montenegro (runner-up); Portugal (third-place)
AFC Preliminary Competition	3	Iraq; Japan; South Korea
CAF Preliminary Competition	4	Ghana; Mali; Morocco; Tunisia
CONCACAF Preliminary Competition	2	Mexico (winner); Costa Rica (runner-up)
2004 CONMEBOL Men Pre-Olympic Tournament	2	Argentina (winner); Paraguay (runner-up)
OFC Preliminary Competition	1	Australia
Total	16	

== Venues ==
- Olympic Stadium, Athens
- Karaiskakis Stadium, Piraeus
- Pankritio Stadium, Heraklion
- Pampeloponnisiako Stadium, Patras
- Kaftanzoglio Stadium, Thessaloniki
- Panthessaliko Stadium, Volos

Athens	Location of the host cities of the men's football tournament of the 2004 Summer Olympics.	Patras
Olympic Stadium	Location of the host cities of the men's football tournament of the 2004 Summer Olympics.	Pampeloponnisiako Stadium
Capacity: 71,030	Location of the host cities of the men's football tournament of the 2004 Summer Olympics.	Capacity: 23,558
Piraeus	Location of the host cities of the men's football tournament of the 2004 Summer Olympics.	Thessaloniki
Karaiskakis Stadium	Location of the host cities of the men's football tournament of the 2004 Summer Olympics.	Kaftanzoglio Stadium
Capacity: 33,334	Location of the host cities of the men's football tournament of the 2004 Summer Olympics.	Capacity: 27,770
Heraklion	Location of the host cities of the men's football tournament of the 2004 Summer Olympics.	Volos
Pankritio Stadium	Location of the host cities of the men's football tournament of the 2004 Summer Olympics.	Panthessaliko Stadium
Capacity: 26,240	Location of the host cities of the men's football tournament of the 2004 Summer Olympics.	Capacity: 22,700

== Match officials ==
Africa

- Essam Abd El Fatah (Egypt)
- Divine Evehe (Cameroon)

Asia

- Subkhiddin Mohd Salleh (Malaysia)

North and Central America

- Benito Archundia (Mexico)
- Carlos Batres (Guatemala)

South America

- Horacio Elizondo (Argentina)
- Jorge Larrionda (Uruguay)
- Carlos Torres (Paraguay)

Europe

- Massimo De Santis (Italy)
- Claus Bo Larsen (Denmark)
- Éric Poulat (France)
- Kyros Vassaras (Greece)

Oceania

- Charles Ariiotima (Tahiti)

== Seeding ==
The draw for the tournament took place on 9 June 2004. Argentina, Greece, Japan and Morocco were seeded for the draw and placed into groups A–D, respectively. The remaining teams were drawn from four pots with teams from the same region kept apart.

Pot 1: Host, Top-Seeded teams from Africa, Americas and Asia	Pot 2: Non-top seeded teams from Asia and Oceania	Pot 3: Non-top seeded teams from Americas	Pot 4: Non-top seeded teams from Africa	Pot 5: Non-top seeded teams from Europe
Greece (assigned to A1); Japan (assigned to Group B); Argentina (assigned to Group C); Morocco (assigned to Group D)	Iraq; South Korea; Australia	Costa Rica; Mexico; Paraguay	Ghana; Mali; Tunisia	Italy; Serbia and Montenegro; Portugal

== Group stage ==
- Teams highlighted in green went through to the knockout stage.

=== Group A ===
Pos	Team	Pld	W	D	L	GF	GA	GD	Pts	Qualification
1	Mali	3	1	2	0	5	3	+2	5	Qualified for the quarterfinals
2	South Korea	3	1	2	0	6	5	+1	5	Qualified for the quarterfinals
3	Mexico	3	1	1	1	3	3	0	4	
4	Greece	3	0	1	2	4	7	−3	1	

11 August 2004
20:30

South Korea	2–2	Greece
Kim Dong-jin 43'; Vyntra 64' (o.g.)	Report	Taralidis 78'; Papadopoulos 82' (pen.)

Kaftanzoglio Stadium, Thessaloniki
Attendance: 25,152
Referee: Jorge Larrionda (Uruguay)
11 August 2004
20:30

Mali	0–0	Mexico
	Report

Panthessaliko Stadium, Volos
Attendance: 10,104
Referee: Subkhiddin Mohd Salleh (Malaysia)

14 August 2004
20:30

South Korea	1–0	Mexico
Kim Jung-woo 16'	Report

Karaiskakis Stadium, Piraeus
Attendance: 14,026
Referee: Claus Bo Larsen (Denmark)
14 August 2004
20:30

Greece	0–2	Mali
	Report	Berthe 2'; N'Diaye 45'

Kaftanzoglio Stadium, Thessaloniki
Attendance: 17,123
Referee: Carlos Torres (Paraguay)

17 August 2004
20:30

South Korea	3–3	Mali
Cho Jae-jin 57', 59'; Tamboura 64' (o.g.)	Report	N'Diaye 7', 24', 55'

Kaftanzoglio Stadium, Thessaloniki
Attendance: 3,320
Referee: Éric Poulat (France)
17 August 2004
20:30

Greece	2–3	Mexico
Taralidis 82' (pen.); Stoltidis 90+3'	Report	Márquez 47'; Bravo 70', 86'

Panthessaliko Stadium, Volos
Attendance: 21,597
Referee: Divine Evehe (Cameroon)

=== Group B ===
Pos	Team	Pld	W	D	L	GF	GA	GD	Pts	Qualification
1	Paraguay	3	2	0	1	6	5	+1	6	Qualified for the quarterfinals
2	Italy	3	1	1	1	5	5	0	4	Qualified for the quarterfinals
3	Ghana	3	1	1	1	4	4	0	4	
4	Japan	3	1	0	2	6	7	−1	3	

12 August 2004
20:30

Paraguay	4–3	Japan
Giménez 5'; Cardozo 26', 37'; Torres 62'	Report	Ono 22' (pen.), 53' (pen.); Ōkubo 81'

Kaftanzoglio Stadium, Thessaloniki
Attendance: 5,318
Referee: Essam Abd El Fatah (Egypt)
12 August 2004
20:30

Ghana	2–2	Italy
Pappoe 36'; Appiah 45+1'	Report	Pinzi 49'; Gilardino 83'

Panthessaliko Stadium, Volos
Attendance: 7,012
Referee: Horacio Elizondo (Argentina)

15 August 2004
20:30

Paraguay	1–2	Ghana
Gamarra 76'		Tiero 81'; Appiah 84'

Kaftanzoglio Stadium, Thessaloniki
Attendance: 1,119
Referee: Benito Archundia (Mexico)
15 August 2004
20:30

Japan	2–3	Italy
Abe 21'; Takamatsu 90+1'	Report	De Rossi 3'; Gilardino 8', 36'

Panthessaliko Stadium, Volos
Attendance: 9,487
Referee: Jorge Larrionda (Uruguay)

18 August 2004
20:30

Paraguay	1–0	Italy
Bareiro 14'	Report

Karaiskakis Stadium, Piraeus
Attendance: 24,160
Referee: Claus Bo Larsen (Denmark)
18 August 2004
20:30

Japan	1–0	Ghana
Ōkubo 37'	Report

Panthessaliko Stadium, Volos
Attendance: 6,813
Referee: Kyros Vassaras (Greece)

=== Group C ===
Pos	Team	Pld	W	D	L	GF	GA	GD	Pts	Qualification
1	Argentina	3	3	0	0	9	0	+9	9	Qualified for the quarterfinals
2	Australia	3	1	1	1	6	3	+3	4	Qualified for the quarterfinals
3	Tunisia	3	1	1	1	4	5	−1	4	
4	Serbia and Montenegro	3	0	0	3	3	14	−11	0	

11 August 2004
20:30

Tunisia	1–1	Australia
Zitouni 69'	Report	Aloisi 45'

Pankritio Stadium, Heraklion
Attendance: 15,757
Referee: Kyros Vassaras (Greece)
11 August 2004
20:30

Argentina	6–0	Serbia and Montenegro
Delgado 11'; K. González 17'; Tevez 42', 43'; Heinze 74'; Rosales 77'	Report

Pampeloponnisiako Stadium, Patras
Attendance: 14,657
Referee: Carlos Batres (Guatemala)

14 August 2004
20:30

Serbia and Montenegro	1–5	Australia
Radonjić 72'	Report	Cahill 11'; Aloisi 45+1', 57'; Elrich 60', 86'

Pankritio Stadium, Heraklion
Attendance: 8,857
Referee: Subkhiddin Mohd Salleh (Malaysia)
14 August 2004
20:30

Argentina	2–0	Tunisia
Tevez 39'; Saviola 72'	Report

Pampeloponnisiako Stadium, Patras
Attendance: 5,112
Referee: Éric Poulat (France)

17 August 2004
20:30

Argentina	1–0	Australia
D'Alessandro 9'	Report

Karaiskakis Stadium, Piraeus
Attendance: 26,338
Referee: Essam Abd El Fatah (Egypt)
17 August 2004
20:30

Serbia and Montenegro	2–3	Tunisia
Krasić 70'; Vukčević 87'	Report	Clayton 41'; Jedidi 83' (pen.); Zitouni 89'

Pampeloponnisiako Stadium, Patras
Attendance: 7,214
Referee: Charles Ariiotima (Tahiti)

=== Group D ===
Pos	Team	Pld	W	D	L	GF	GA	GD	Pts	Qualification
1	Iraq	3	2	0	1	7	4	+3	6	Qualified for the quarterfinals
2	Costa Rica	3	1	1	1	4	4	0	4	Qualified for the quarterfinals
3	Morocco	3	1	1	1	3	3	0	4	
4	Portugal	3	1	0	2	6	9	−3	3	

12 August 2004
20:30

Costa Rica	0–0	Morocco
	Report

Pankritio Stadium, Heraklion
Attendance: 3,212
Referee: Massimo De Santis (Italy)
12 August 2004
20:30

Iraq	4–2	Portugal
Emad 16'; Hawar 29'; Mahmoud 56'; Sadir 90+3'	Report	Jabar 13' (o.g.); Bosingwa 45'

Pampeloponnisiako Stadium, Patras
Attendance: 5,689
Referee: Divine Evehe (Cameroon)

15 August 2004
20:30

Costa Rica	0–2	Iraq
	Report	Hawar 67'; Karim 72'

Karaiskakis Stadium, Piraeus
Attendance: 12,150
Referee: Charles Ariiotima (Tahiti)
15 August 2004
20:30

Morocco	1–2	Portugal
Bouden 85'	Report	Ronaldo 40'; Costa 73'

Pankritio Stadium, Heraklion
Attendance: 7,581
Referee: Carlos Batres (Guatemala)

18 August 2004
20:30

Morocco	2–1	Iraq
Bouden 69' (pen.); Aqqal 77'	Report	Sadir 63'

Pampeloponnisiako Stadium, Patras
Attendance: 4,019
Referee: Horacio Elizondo (Argentina)
18 August 2004
20:30

Costa Rica	4–2	Portugal
Villalobos 50'; Meira 68' (o.g.); Saborío 71'; Brenes 90+1'	Report	Almeida 29'; Ribeiro 54'

Pankritio Stadium, Heraklion
Attendance: 11,218
Referee: Carlos Torres (Paraguay)

== Knockout stage ==
Quarter-finals
21 August – Athens (Karaiskakis)
Mali	0
Italy (a.e.t.)	1
21 August – Patras
Argentina	4
Costa Rica	0
21 August – Heraklion
Iraq	1
Australia	0
21 August – Thessaloniki
Paraguay	3
South Korea	2

Semi-finals
24 August – Athens (Karaiskakis)
Italy	0
Argentina	3
24 August – Thessaloniki
Iraq	1
Paraguay	3

Gold medal match
28 August – Athens (Olympic)
Argentina	1
Paraguay	0
Bronze medal match
27 August – Thessaloniki
Italy	1
Iraq	0

=== Quarter-finals ===
21 August 2004
18:00

Mali	0–1 (a.e.t.)	Italy
	Report	Bovo 116'

Karaiskakis Stadium, Piraeus
Attendance: 27,543
Referee: Carlos Torres (Paraguay)

21 August 2004
18:00

Iraq	1–0	Australia
Emad 64'	Report

Pankritio Stadium, Heraklion
Attendance: 10,023
Referee: Carlos Batres (Guatemala)

21 August 2004
21:00

Argentina	4–0	Costa Rica
Delgado 24'; Tevez 43', 82', 83'	Report

Pampeloponnisiako Stadium, Patras
Attendance: 9,292
Referee: Kyros Vassaras (Greece)

21 August 2004
21:00

Paraguay	3–2	South Korea
Bareiro 19', 71'; Cardozo 61'	Report	Lee Chun-soo 74', 79' (pen.)

Kaftanzoglio Stadium, Thessaloniki
Attendance: 4,080
Referee: Massimo De Santis (Italy)

=== Semi-finals ===
24 August 2004
18:00

Italy	0–3	Argentina
	Report	Tevez 16'; L. González 69'; M. González 84'

Karaiskakis Stadium, Piraeus
Attendance: 30,910
Referee: Benito Archundia (Mexico)

24 August 2004
21:00

Iraq	1–3	Paraguay
Farhan 83'	Report	Cardozo 17', 34'; Bareiro 68'

Kaftanzoglio Stadium, Thessaloniki
Attendance: 6,213
Referee: Éric Poulat (France)

=== Bronze medal match ===
27 August 2004
20:30

Italy	1–0	Iraq
Gilardino 8'	Report

Kaftanzoglio Stadium, Thessaloniki
Attendance: 5,203
Referee: Jorge Larrionda (Uruguay)

=== Gold medal match ===
28 August 2004
10:00

Argentina	1–0	Paraguay
Tevez 18'	Report

Olympic Stadium, Athens
Attendance: 41,116
Referee: Kyros Vassaras (Greece)

== Final ranking ==
Pos	Team	Pld	W	D	L	GF	GA	GD	Pts
1	Argentina	6	6	0	0	17	0	+17	18
2	Paraguay	6	4	0	2	12	9	+3	12
3	Italy	6	3	1	2	7	8	−1	10
4	Iraq	6	3	0	3	9	8	+1	9
5	Mali	4	1	2	1	5	4	+1	5
6	South Korea	4	1	2	1	8	8	0	5
7	Australia	4	1	1	2	6	4	+2	4
8	Costa Rica	4	1	1	2	4	8	−4	4
9	Ghana	3	1	1	1	4	4	0	4
10	Morocco	3	1	1	1	3	3	0	4
11	Mexico	3	1	1	1	3	3	0	4
12	Tunisia	3	1	1	1	4	5	−1	4
13	Japan	3	1	0	2	6	7	−1	3
14	Portugal	3	1	0	2	6	9	−3	3
15	Greece	3	0	1	2	4	7	−3	1
16	Serbia and Montenegro	3	0	0	3	3	14	−11	0

== Statistics ==
=== Goalscorers ===
With eight goals, Carlos Tevez of Argentina is the top scorer in the tournament. In total, 101 goals were scored by 65 different players, with four of them credited as own goals.

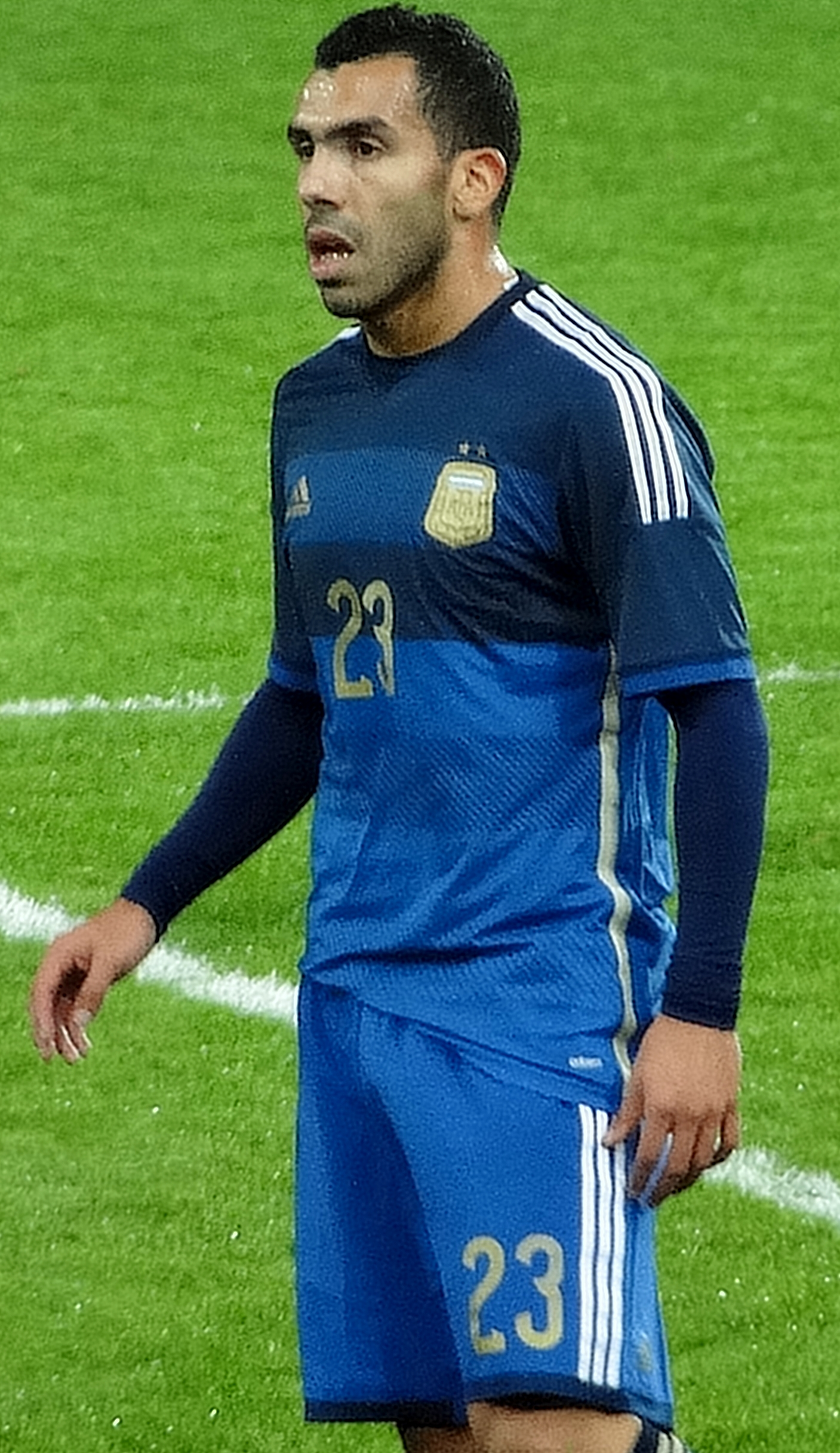
Carlos Tevez, key player and top scorer (8 goals)

8 goals

- (Argentina) Carlos Tevez

5 goals

- (Paraguay) José Cardozo

4 goals

- (Italy) Alberto Gilardino
- (Mali) Tenema N'Diaye
- (Paraguay) Fredy Bareiro

3 goals

- (Australia) John Aloisi

2 goals

- (Argentina) César Delgado
- (Australia) Ahmad Elrich
- (Ghana) Stephen Appiah
- (Greece) Giannis Taralidis
- (Iraq) Emad Mohammed
- (Iraq) Hawar Mulla Mohammed
- (Iraq) Salih Sadir
- (Japan) Yoshito Ōkubo
- (Japan) Shinji Ono
- (Mexico) Omar Bravo
- (Morocco) Bouabid Bouden
- (South Korea) Cho Jae-jin
- (South Korea) Lee Chun-soo
- (Tunisia) Ali Zitouni

1 goal

- (Argentina) Andrés D'Alessandro
- (Argentina) Gabriel Heinze
- (Argentina) Kily González
- (Argentina) Lucho González
- (Argentina) Mariano González
- (Argentina) Mauro Rosales
- (Argentina) Javier Saviola
- (Australia) Tim Cahill
- (Costa Rica) Pablo Brenes
- (Costa Rica) Álvaro Saborío
- (Costa Rica) José Villalobos
- (Ghana) Emmanuel Pappoe
- (Ghana) William Tiero
- (Greece) Dimitrios Papadopoulos
- (Greece) Ieroklis Stoltidis
- (Iraq) Razzaq Farhan
- (Iraq) Mahdi Karim
- (Iraq) Younis Mahmoud
- (Italy) Cesare Bovo
- (Italy) Daniele De Rossi
- (Italy) Giampiero Pinzi
- (Japan) Yūki Abe
- (Japan) Daiki Takamatsu
- (Mali) Mamadi Berthe
- (Mexico) Rafael Márquez Lugo
- (Morocco) Salaheddine Aqqal
- (Paraguay) Carlos Gamarra
- (Paraguay) Pablo Giménez
- (Paraguay) Aureliano Torres
- (Portugal) Hugo Almeida
- (Portugal) José Bosingwa
- (Portugal) Ricardo Costa
- (Portugal) Jorge Ribeiro
- (Portugal) Cristiano Ronaldo
- (Serbia and Montenegro) Miloš Krasić
- (Serbia and Montenegro) Srđan Radonjić
- (Serbia and Montenegro) Simon Vukčević
- (South Korea) Kim Dong-jin
- (South Korea) Kim Jung-woo
- (Tunisia) José Clayton
- (Tunisia) Mohamed Jedidi

Own goals

- (Greece) Loukas Vyntra (playing against South Korea)
- (Mali) Adama Tamboura (playing against South Korea)
- (Iraq) Haidar Jabar (playing against Portugal)
- (Portugal) Fernando Meira (playing against Costa Rica)
