= José Villalobos =

Costa Rican footballer (born 1981)

Personal information
- Full name: José Miguel Villalobos Chan
- Date of birth: 5 June 1981 (age 45)
- Place of birth: Cartago, Costa Rica
- Height: 1.82 m (6 ft 0 in)
- Position: Centre-back

Senior career*
| Years | Team | Apps | (Gls) |
| 2000–2005 | Cartaginés | | |
| 2005–2008 | Herediano | | |
| 2008–2014 | Cartaginés | 191 | (13) |
| 2014 | Pérez Zeledón | 3 | (0) |
| 2015 | Uruguay de Coronado | 4 | (0) |

International career
| 2004 | Costa Rica U23 | 4 | (1) |
- * Club domestic league appearances and goals

José Miguel Villalobos Chan (born 5 June 1981) is a Costa Rican former professional footballer who played as a centre-back.

== Club career ==
Villalobos made his debut for Cartaginés in 2000 and played for 10 years with the side during two spells, both sides of a couple of seasons at Herediano, before eventually moving to Pérez Zeledón in summer 2014. He signed for Uruguay de Coronado ahead of the 2015 Verano season.

== International career ==
Villalobos was a member of the Costa Rica U23 team that competed at 2004 Summer Olympics, playing the full 90 minutes in all matches as Costa Rica lost to Argentina on the quarterfinals and scoring in the group stage match against Portugal. Villalobos was called up for the first time to the senior national team in August 2009, but has not yet made a competitive appearance for the full squad.
