= 2004 CAF Champions League group stage =

- Dates: 10 July – 17 October 2004

Tournament statistics
- Matches played: 24
- Goals scored: 63 (2.63 per match)

The group stage of the 2004 CAF Champions League was played from 10 July to 17 October 2004. A total of eight teams competed in the group stage, the group winners and runners-up advance to the Knockout stage playing semifinal rounds before the final.

== Format ==
In the group stage, each group was played on a home-and-away round-robin basis. The winners and the runners-up of each group advanced to the Knockout stage.

=== Tiebreakers ===
The teams were ranked according to points (3 points for a win, 1 point for a draw, 0 points for a loss). If tied on points, tiebreakers were applied in the following order (Regulations III. 20 & 21):

1. Points in head-to-head matches among tied teams;
2. Goal difference in head-to-head matches among tied teams;
3. Goals scored in head-to-head matches among tied teams;
4. Away goals scored in head-to-head matches among tied teams;
5. If more than two teams were tied, and after applying all head-to-head criteria above, a subset of teams were still tied, all head-to-head criteria above were reapplied exclusively to this subset of teams;
6. Goal difference in all group matches;
7. Goals scored in all group matches;
8. Away goals scored in all group matches;
9. Drawing of lots.

== Groups ==
Key to colours in group tables
Group winners and runners-up advance to the Knockout stage

=== Group A ===
Pos	Team	Pld	W	D	L	GF	GA	GD	Pts	Qualification
1	(Tunisia) Étoile du Sahel	6	3	2	1	8	5	+3	8	Advance to knockout stage
2	(Nigeria) Enyimba	6	2	2	2	11	4	+7	6	Advance to knockout stage
3	(Ivory Coast) Africa Sports National	6	2	1	3	6	10	−4	5	
4	(Malawi) Bakili Bullets	6	1	3	2	5	11	−6	5	

Updated to match(es) played on unknown. Source:

1 July 2004
Bakili Bullets	0–1	Étoile du Sahel
Africa Sports National	0–3	Enyimba
25 July 2004
Étoile du Sahel	2–0	Africa Sports National
Enyimba	6–0	Bakili Bullets
7 August 2004
Étoile du Sahel	1–0	Enyimba
8 August 2004
Bakili Bullets	2–1	Africa Sports National
12 September 2004
Enyimba	1–1	Étoile du Sahel
Africa Sports National	1–1	Bakili Bullets
26 September 2004
Étoile du Sahel	1–1	Bakili Bullets
Enyimba	0–1	Africa Sports National
16 October 2004
Africa Sports National	3–2	Étoile du Sahel
Bakili Bullets	1–1	Enyimba

=== Group B ===
Pos	Team	Pld	W	D	L	GF	GA	GD	Pts	Qualification
1	(Tunisia) ES Tunis	6	4	0	2	12	7	+5	8	Advance to knockout stage
2	(Senegal) Jeanne d'Arc	6	3	2	1	8	9	−1	8	Advance to knockout stage
3	(Algeria) USM Alger	6	2	1	3	8	8	0	5	
4	(South Africa) Supersport United	6	1	1	4	5	9	−4	3	

Rules for classification: Group stage tiebreakers
10 July 2004
: UTC+2

Supersport United (South Africa)	1–2	(Tunisia) ES Tunis

Loftus Versfeld Stadium, Pretoria, South Africa
11 July 2004
17:00 UTC+0

ASC Jeanne d'Arc (Senegal)	2–1	(Algeria) USM Alger
N'Diaye 30'; Diarra 80'		Diallo 73'

Stade Demba Diop, Dakar, Senegal
Referee: Evene Divine Raphael (Cameroon)

23 July 2004
: UTC+1

USM Alger (Algeria)	2–1	(South Africa) Supersport United
Diallo 34', 90+4'		Raselemane 84'

Stade 5 Juillet 1962, Algiers, Algeria
Referee: Mohamed Guezzaz (Morocco)
24 July 2004
: UTC+1

ES Tunis (Tunisia)	5–0	(Senegal) ASC Jeanne d'Arc

Stade El Menzah, Tunis, Tunisia

6 August 2004
20:00 UTC+1

Espérance de Tunis (Tunisia)	2–1	(Algeria) USM Alger
Zitouni 23', 67'		Dziri 57'

Stade El Menzah, Tunis, Tunisia
Referee: Aboubacar Sharaf (Ivory Coast)
7 August 2004
: UTC+2

Supersport United (South Africa)	1–1	(Senegal) ASC Jeanne d'Arc

Loftus Versfeld Stadium, Pretoria, South Africa

10 September 2004
: UTC+1

USM Alger (Algeria)	3–0	(Tunisia) Espérance de Tunis
Bourahli 15', 55'; Diallo 50'

Stade 5 Juillet 1962, Algiers, Algeria
Referee: Chukwujekwu Chukwudi (Nigeria)
11 September 2004
: UTC+0

ASC Jeanne d'Arc (Senegal)	2–0	(South Africa) Supersport United

Stade Demba Diop, Dakar, Senegal

25 September 2004
18:00 UTC+1

USM Alger (Algeria)	1–1	(Senegal) ASC Jeanne d'Arc
Diallo 72'		N'Doye 14'

Stade Mustapha Tchaker, Blida, Algeria
Referee: Coffi Codjia (Benin)
26 September 2004
: UTC+1

ES Tunis (Tunisia)	2–0	(South Africa) Supersport United

Stade El Menzah, Tunis, Tunisia

17 October 2004
: UTC+2

Supersport United (South Africa)	2–0	(Algeria) USM Alger
Mokoro 77'; Mahlangu 86'

Loftus Versfeld Stadium, Pretoria, South Africa
17 October 2004
: UTC+0

ASC Jeanne d'Arc (Senegal)	2–1	(Tunisia) ES Tunis

Stade Demba Diop, Dakar, Senegal
