= Sabeur Trabelsi =

Tunisian former footballer

Sabeur Trabelsi (Arabic: صابر طرابلسي) (born 18 February 1978) is a Tunisian former footballer who last played for Chatham Town.

Trabelsi previously played for Étoile Sportive du Sahel. Prior to the 2006–07 season he signed non-contract terms with Sittingbourne in the English Isthmian League Division One South. Trabelsi signed for Chatham Town in February 2008.

He was a member of the Tunisian 2004 Olympic football team, who exited in the first round, finishing third in group C, behind group and gold medal winners Argentina and Australia.

== Personal life and legal issues ==
In June 2023, Trabelsi was sentenced to six years in prison after being convicted of manslaughter and perverting the course of justice. The conviction followed the death of Jason Page, 51, whom Trabelsi fatally struck while working as a security guard at a Marks & Spencer store in Lower Earley, Reading, on 31 March 2021.

Mr. Page, who had stolen meat and beer with an accomplice, fell and sustained a fatal head injury after being hit, dying in hospital the next day. The judge, Amjad Nawaz, told Trabelsi that by "lashing out in the way that you did, you must have intended some harm or were reckless to the harm caused." The court also heard that Trabelsi gave police an "untruthful account" of events following the incident.

During sentencing, Judge Nawaz said members of the public expected a higher level of restraint from someone working in security, and that Trabelsi’s actions had "catastrophic consequences." Marks & Spencer issued a statement offering condolences to Mr. Page’s family and friends.
