= David Tyavkase =

Nigerian footballer

Personal information
- Full name: David Terzungwe Tyavkase
- Date of birth: December 30, 1984 (age 41)
- Place of birth: Ushongo, Benue State, Nigeria
- Height: 1.78 m (5 ft 10 in)
- Position: Striker

Team information
- Current team: Lobi Stars
- Number: 10

Senior career*
Years	Team	Apps	(Gls)
2003–2007	Enyimba		
2007–2008	Lobi Stars		
2009–2011	Enyimba		
2012–2013	Lobi Stars	5	(2)
2013–2016	US Bitam		
2016-	Lobi Stars		

International career
2005	Nigeria	1	(0)
- * Club domestic league appearances and goals

David Terzungwe Tyavkase (born December 30, 1984, in Benue State) is a Nigerian football player currently with Lobi Stars FC

== Career ==
Tyavkase began his career with Enyimba and in July 2007 joined Lobi Stars. After a two-year spell, he returned on 12 February 2009 to Enyimba.

The offensive allrounder, who can play as striker or midfielder, returned to Lobi at the start of the 2012 season. In September 2013, Tyavkase left Nigeria for the 2012–13 Gabonese league winners US Bitam.

=== International ===
He earned in the year 2005 season one cap for the Nigeria national football team.
