= Marouane Bokri =

Tunisian footballer

Personal information
- Date of birth: 28 December 1974 (age 51)
- Position: Midfielder

International career
Years	Team	Apps	(Gls)
- Tunisia

Marouane Bokri (born 28 December 1974) is a Tunisian former footballer. He competed in the men's tournament at the 1996 Summer Olympics.
