= Haidar Abdul-Jabar =

Iraqi footballer (born 1976)

Haidar Jabar
Personal information
- Full name: Haidar Abdul-Jabar Kadhim
- Date of birth: August 25, 1976 (age 50)
- Place of birth: Iraq
- Height: 1.78 m (5 ft 10 in)
- Position: Defender

Team information
- Current team: Iraq U19 (Assist. Manager)

Youth career
- 1988–1995: Al-Zawraa

Senior career*
Years	Team	Apps	(Gls)
1995–1998	Al-Zawraa		
1998–2001	Salam Zgharta		
2001–2003	Al-Zawraa		
2003–2007	Al-Ittihad		
2007–2008	Al-Wahdat		
2008	Shabab Al-Hussein		
2008–2011	Erbil		
2011–2012	Al-Zawraa		

International career
2004	Iraq Olympic (O.P.)	?	(?)
1996–2006	Iraq	34	(0)

Managerial career
- 2021–: Iraq U19 (Assist. Manager)
- * Club domestic league appearances and goals

Haidar Abdul-Jabar Kadhim (Arabic: حَيْدَر عَبْد الْجَبَّار كَاظِم; born August 25, 1976), known as Haidar Jabar, is an Iraqi former football defender who last played for the Al-Zawra'a SC football club.

== Honours ==
=== Country ===
- 2002 WAFF Champions
- 4th place in 2004 Athens Olympics
