= Muhammad Yusuf (footballer) =

Indonesian footballer

M. Yusuf
Personal information
- Full name: Muhammad Yusuf
- Date of birth: 22 June 1986 (age 40)
- Place of birth: Deli Serdang, Indonesia
- Height: 1.74 m (5 ft 8 1/2 in)
- Position: Midfielder

Senior career*
Years	Team	Apps	(Gls)
2008–2009	Persik Kediri	25	(0)
2010–2011	PSIS Semarang	11	(3)
2011–2013	Deltras	19	(0)
2014–2016	Persepam Madura Utama	32	(1)
- * Club domestic league appearances and goals as of 11 July 2012

Muhammad Yusuf (born June 22, 1986) is an Indonesian former footballer who plays as a midfielder.
