= Sibusiso Mahlangu =

South African soccer player

Personal information
- Full name: Sibusiso Johannes Mahlangu
- Date of birth: 17 May 1982 (age 44)
- Place of birth: Daveyton, South Africa
- Height: 1.70 m (5 ft 7 in)
- Position: Central midfielder

Youth career
- Sampdoria (South Africa)
- Kaizer Chiefs

Senior career*
Years	Team	Apps	(Gls)
2001–2008	SuperSport United	400	(31)
2008–2011	Bidvest Wits	87	(13)
- * Club domestic league appearances and goals

Sibusiso Mahlangu (born 17 May 1982) is a South African former professional soccer player who played as a midfielder.
