= Austin Ejide =

Nigerian footballer (born 1984)

- Ejide with Hapoel Hadera in 2019

Personal information
- Full name: Augustine Amamchukwu Ejide
- Date of birth: 8 April 1984 (age 42)
- Place of birth: Onitsha, Nigeria
- Height: 1.89 m (6 ft 2 in)
- Position: Goalkeeper

Senior career*
Years	Team	Apps	(Gls)
1999–2002	Gabros International	100	(0)
2002–2006	Étoile Sportive du Sahel	120	(0)
2006–2009	Bastia	44	(0)
2009–2012	Hapoel Petah Tikva	57	(0)
2012–2015	Hapoel Be'er Sheva	94	(0)
2017–2020	Hapoel Hadera	79	(0)
2020–2021	Sektzia Ness Ziona	31	(0)
Total		525	(0)

International career
2001–2014	Nigeria	34	(0)
Medal record
Men's football
Representing Nigeria
Africa Cup of Nations
Winner	2013 South Africa
- * Club domestic league appearances and goals

Augustine "Austin" Amamchukwu Ejide MON (born 8 April 1984) is a Nigerian former professional footballer who played as a goalkeeper.

Ejide played for Gabros International and Bastia in Corsica, which competed in Ligue 2. He played for Israeli Premier side Hapoel Be'er Sheva until May 2015, and later played for Hapoel Hadera.

== Club career ==
Ejide was born in Onitsha, Anambra State. He started his career with Gabros International where he had an good season before joining Étoile du Sahel. With the Tunisian club, he reached two CAF Champions League finals.

In 2006, Ejide joined Bastia of the French Ligue 2, where he spent three years before moving to Israeli team Hapoel Petah Tikva, where he rescued the team from relegation.

Ejide moved to Hapoel Be'er Sheva in 2012, where he played until the end of the 2014–15 season. 2017–18 Ejide kept 27 games and kept 15 clean sheets. The shot stopper earned a spot for Hapoel Hadera in the Israeli Premier League.

== International career ==
Ejide made his debut for Nigeria against Namibia on 16 June 2001. He has been named in three FIFA World Cup squads: 2002 in Japan and South Korea, 2010 in South Africa, and 2014 in Brazil. He has also been a member of the Super Eagles' squad at five Africa Cup of Nations tournaments: 2004, 2006, 2008, 2010 and 2013, winning the competition in the latter. In 2013, he was selected for Nigeria's squad at the FIFA Confederations Cup.

In the 2008, Africa Cup of Nations hosted in Ghana, Nigeria coach Berti Vogts selected Ejide as first choice goalkeeper, ahead of Vincent Enyeama, in all of Super Eagles' four matches. On 21 January 2008, he played his first AFCON game as Nigeria lost 2–1 to Ivory Coast in the first match of Group B. However, he kept clean sheets in Nigeria's 0–0 draw with Mali and 2–0 win over Benin.

== Personal life ==
His name, Amamchukwu, means "I know God".

== Honours ==
Orders

- Member of the Order of the Niger
