= Tsweu Mokoro =

South African footballer

Personal information
- Full name: Piet Tsweu Mokoro
- Date of birth: 3 January 1982 (age 44)
- Place of birth: Sasolburg, South Africa
- Height: 1.65 m (5 ft 5 in)
- Position: Midfielder

Senior career*
Years	Team	Apps	(Gls)
- Ajax Cape Town
- Moroka Swallows
- SuperSport United
- Free State Stars
2009–2013	AmaZulu	82	(1)
2013–2016	African Warriors	57	(1)
- * Club domestic league appearances and goals

Piet Tsweu Mokoro (born 3 January 1982) is a South African former soccer player who played as a midfielder.
