= Kaies Zouaghi =

Tunisian footballer

Personal information
- Date of birth: 19 December 1977 (age 48)
- Place of birth: Béja, Tunisia
- Position: Defender

Senior career*
Years	Team	Apps	(Gls)
1997–1999	Olympique Béja		
1999–2006	Étoile du Sahel		
2006–2008	Al-Khaleej		

International career
1999–2007	Tunisia	7	(0)

Managerial career
- 2014: Olympique Béja
- 2016–2017: ES Hammam-Sousse
- 2017: Damac
- 2017–2018: Étoile du Sahel (assistant)
- 2018–2019: AS Gabès
- 2019: AS Gabès
- 2020: Étoile du Sahel
- * Club domestic league appearances and goals

Kaies Zouaghi (born 19 December 1977) is a retired Tunisian football defender and later manager.

He is a brother of Chaker Zouaghi.
