= Ajibade Omolade =

Nigerian footballer

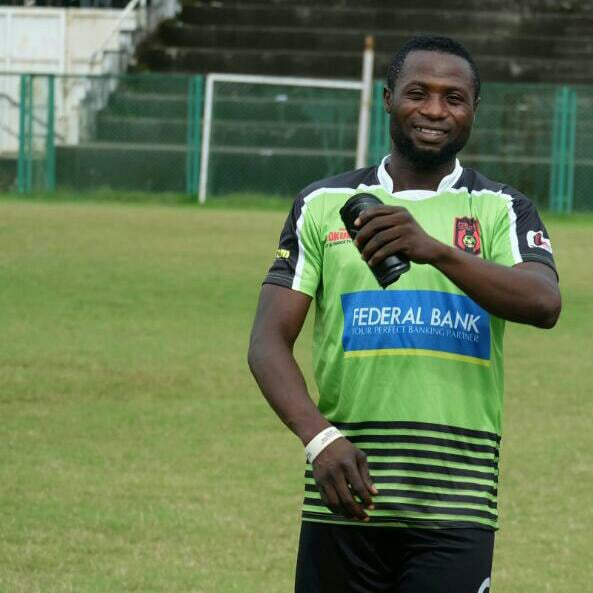
- Omolade in 2017

Personal information
- Date of birth: 12 June 1984 (age 42)
- Place of birth: Nigeria
- Height: 1.68 m (5 ft 6 in)
- Position: Left-back

Senior career*
Years	Team	Apps	(Gls)
2001–2002	El-Kanemi Warriors		
2002–2008	Enyimba International F.C.		
2008	→ Gombe United F.C. (loan)		
2009	Al-Hilal Omdurman		
2010	Mighty Jets		
2010–2011	Plateau United		
2012	Enugu Rangers		
2013	Niger Tornadoes F.C.		

International career
2000–2001	Nigeria U20		
- * Club domestic league appearances and goals

Ajibade Omolade (born 12 June 1984) is a Nigerian former professional footballer who played as a left-back.

== Career ==
=== Nigeria ===
Omolade began his professional career with El-Kanemi Warriors in Maiduguri Borno state. He moved to Enyimba International F.C. As the club captain Omolade lead the team to African champions league twice and he won the CAF Champions League in 2003 and 2004. He also won The CAF Super Cup two times with the club.

=== Germany ===
Omolade first moved out of Nigeria In July 2007, he was on trial at 1. FC Köln. in Germany, later he returned to Nigeria to join his old club Enyimba International; he played a few matches there and later the club loaned him out to Gombe United F.C. in the Nigerian Premier League.

=== Sudan ===
In 2009, Omolade joined the Sudanese club Al Hilal Omdurman on a four-year deal. After one year he returned to Nigeria where he sign one-year deal with Plateau United in the Nigerian Premier League. Later he joined Enugu Rangers. In 2013 he joined Niger Tornadoes Football Club.

== International career ==
In 2000, Omolade represented Nigeria U20 at the U20 Africa Cup of Nations in Ethiopia.

== Honours ==
=== Club ===
- 2003 CAF Champions League Cup Winner with Enyimba International F.C.
- 2004 CAF Champions League Cup winner with Enyimba International F.C.
- Four times Nigeria Premier League Cup winner with Enyimba International F.C.
- Nigerian F.A Cup winner with Enyimba International F.C.
- Sudanese F.A Cup winner with Al-Hilal Omdurman
