= Mohamed Miladi =

Tunisian footballer

Personal information
- Date of birth: 18 August 1981 (age 45)
- Place of birth: Zarzis, Tunisia
- Height: 1.81 m (5 ft 11 in)
- Position: Defender

Senior career*
Years	Team	Apps	(Gls)
2000–2002	ES Zarzis		
2002–2006	Étoile du Sahel		
2006–2010	ES Zarzis		

International career
2002	Tunisia	1	(0)
- * Club domestic league appearances and goals

Mohamed Miladi (born 18 August 1981) is a retired Tunisian football defender.
