= Mohamed Jedidi =

Tunisian footballer

Personal information
- Date of birth: 10 September 1978 (age 48)
- Place of birth: Grombalia, Tunisia
- Height: 1.73 m (5 ft 8 in)
- Position: Midfielder

Senior career*
Years	Team	Apps	(Gls)
1999–2001	ES Zarzis		
2001–2004	US Monastir		
2004–2006	Étoile du Sahel		
2006–2008	Stade Tunisien	2008-2010	
2010–2011	Asswehly		

International career
2003–2004	Tunisia	13	(1)
Medal record
Men's football
Representing Tunisia
Africa Cup of Nations
Winner	2004 Tunisia
- * Club domestic league appearances and goals

Mohamed Jedidi (born 10 September 1978) is a Tunisian former footballer who played as a midfielder.

== Career ==
Born in Grombalia, Jedidi played club football in Tunisia and Libya for ES Zarzis, US Monastir, Étoile du Sahel, Stade Tunisien and Asswehly.

He earned 13 caps for Tunisia between 2003 and 2004, making a further 3 appearances for them at the 2004 Summer Olympics.

== Honours ==
Tunisia

- Africa Cup of Nations: 2004
