= Al Ahly SC in international football =

Egyptian club records

- Club: Al Ahly SC
- Most appearances: Hossam Ashour 167
- Top scorer: Mahmoud El Khatib 37
- First entry: 1976 African Cup of Champions Clubs
- Latest entry: 2024–25 CAF Champions League

Titles
- Champions League: 12: 1982; 1987; 2001; 2005; 2006; 2008; 2012; 2013; 2020; 2021; 2023; 2024
- Confederation Cup: 1: 2014
- Cup Winners' Cup: 4: 1984; 1985; 1986; 1993
- Super Cup: 8: 2002; 2006; 2007; 2009; 2013; 2014; 2021 (May); 2021 (Dec)
- Afro-Asian Cup: 1: 1988

Al Ahly SC is an Egyptian professional football club based in Cairo. The club first participated in an African competition in 1976. The first international cup they took part in was the African Cup of Champions Clubs where they lost 1–3 on aggregate to Algerian club MC Alger.

Al Ahly won four African Cup Winners' Cup, the most of any team during the competition between 1975 and 2004. They also have won the CAF Champions League eleven times which is also the most of any team which included 2 back to back titles in 2005/2006 and 2012/2013 and 2019/2020 and 2020/2021. The club has also participated in nine FIFA Club World Cups with their best performance being third place at the 2006, 2020, 2021.and 2023.

== African football ==
- PR = Preliminary round
- FR = First round
- SR = Second round
- PO = Play-off round
- QF = Quarter-final
- SF = Semi-final

Season	Competition	Round	Country	Club	Home	Away	Aggregate
1976	African Cup of Champions Clubs	SR	Algeria	MC Alger	1–0	0–3	1–3
1977	African Cup of Champions Clubs	FR	Somalia	Horseed	3–0	1–1	4–1
1977	African Cup of Champions Clubs	SR	Libya	Al Madina	7–2	0–1	7–3
1977	African Cup of Champions Clubs	QF	Ghana	Hearts of Oak	1–0	0–3	1–3
1978	African Cup of Champions Clubs	FR	Uganda	KCCA	w/o (Note: KCCA won on walkover after Al Ahly withdrew.)		
1981	African Cup of Champions Clubs	FR	Kenya	Abaluhya	3–1	1–1	4–2
1981	African Cup of Champions Clubs	SR	Uganda	Nile Breweries	5–0	0–2	5–2
1981	African Cup of Champions Clubs	QF	Gabon	USM Libreville	3–0	1–1	4–1
1981	African Cup of Champions Clubs	SF	Algeria	JE Tizi Ouzou	w/o (Note: JE Tizi Ouzou won on walkover after Al Ahly withdrew following the assassination of Anwar Sadat.)		
1982	African Cup of Champions Clubs	FR	Somalia	Lavori Publici	1–0	0–0	1–0
1982	African Cup of Champions Clubs	SR	Tanzania	Young Africans	5–0	1–1	6–1
1982	African Cup of Champions Clubs	QF	Zambia	Green Buffaloes	3–0	0–1	3–1
1982	African Cup of Champions Clubs	SF	Nigeria	Enugu Rangers	4–0	0–1	4–1
1982	African Cup of Champions Clubs	Final	Ghana	Asante Kotoko	3–0	1–1	4–1
1983	African Cup of Champions Clubs	FR	Sudan	Al Merrikh	1–0	0–0	1–0
1983	African Cup of Champions Clubs	SR	Zimbabwe	Dynamos	4–1	2–1	6–2
1983	African Cup of Champions Clubs	QF	Cameroon	Canon Yaoundé	5–0	0–1	5–1
1983	African Cup of Champions Clubs	SF	Zambia	Nkana Red Devils	2–0	0–0	2–0
1983	African Cup of Champions Clubs	Final	Ghana	Asante Kotoko	0–0	0–1	0–1
1984	African Cup Winners' Cup	FR	Morocco	CLAS Casablanca	3–1	2–0	5–1
1984	African Cup Winners' Cup	SR	Algeria	MP Alger	3–1	0–1	3–2
1984	African Cup Winners' Cup	QF	Ivory Coast	ASEC Mimosas	3–1	1–2	4–3
1984	African Cup Winners' Cup	SF	Egypt	Al Mokawloon Al Arab	0–0	1–1	1–1 (a)
1984	African Cup Winners' Cup	Final	Cameroon	Canon Yaoundé	1–0	0–1	1–1 (4–2 p)
1985	African Cup Winners' Cup	FR	Tunisia	AS Marsa	4–0	1–0	5–0
1985	African Cup Winners' Cup	SR	Tanzania	Simba	2–0	1–2	3–2
1985	African Cup Winners' Cup	QF	Benin	Dragons de l'Ouémé	4–0	1–1	5–1
1985	African Cup Winners' Cup	SF	Libya	Al Nasr	w/o (Note: Al Ahly won on walkover after Al Nasr withdrew.)		
1985	African Cup Winners' Cup	Final	Nigeria	Leventis United	2–0	0–1	2–1
1986	African Cup Winners' Cup	FR	Uganda	Express	2–0	0–1	2–1
1986	African Cup Winners' Cup	SR	Swaziland	Mbabane Highlanders	3–0	5–0	8–0
1986	African Cup Winners' Cup	QF	Zambia	Power Dynamos	2–0	0–1	2–1
1986	African Cup Winners' Cup	SF	Egypt	Ismaily	0–0	1–1	1–1 (a)
1986	African Cup Winners' Cup	Final	Gabon	AS Sogara	3–0	0–2	3–2
1987	African Cup of Champions Clubs	FR	Rwanda	Panthères Noires	4–0	1–1	5–1
1987	African Cup of Champions Clubs	SR	Kenya	AFC Leopards	6–0	1–2	7–2
1987	African Cup of Champions Clubs	QF	Ivory Coast	Africa Sports	2–0	0–2	2–2 (4–2 p)
1987	African Cup of Champions Clubs	SF	Ghana	Asante Kotoko	2–0	0–1	2–1
1987	African Cup of Champions Clubs	Final	Sudan	Al Hilal	2–0	0–0	2–0
1988	African Cup of Champions Clubs	FR	Tanzania	Young Africans	4–0	0–0	4–0
1988	African Cup of Champions Clubs	SR	Uganda	SC Villa	3–1	3–2	6–3
1988	African Cup of Champions Clubs	QF	Mozambique	Matchedje	2–0	0–1	2–1
1988	African Cup of Champions Clubs	SF	Algeria	ES Sétif	2–0	0–2	2–2 (2–4 p)
1990	African Cup of Champions Clubs	FR	Libya	Al Ittihad Tripoli	5–0	3–0	8–0
1990	African Cup of Champions Clubs	SR	Tunisia	Espérance de Tunis	0–0	0–0	0–0 (2–4 p)
1991	African Cup of Champions Clubs	FR	Ethiopia	Addis Ababa Brewery	w/o (Note: Al Ahly won on walkover after Addis Ababa Brewery withdrew.)		
1991	African Cup of Champions Clubs	SR	Zimbabwe	Highlanders	3–1	1–0	4–1
1991	African Cup of Champions Clubs	QF	Uganda	SC Villa	2–0	0–2	2–2 (2–4 p)
1992	African Cup Winners' Cup	FR	Kenya	AFC Leopards	2–0	1–2	3–2
1992	African Cup Winners' Cup	SR	Zambia	Kabwe Warriors	1–0	0–1	1–1 (4–3 p)
1992	African Cup Winners' Cup	QF	Ivory Coast	Africa Sports	2–0	0–3	2–3
1993	African Cup Winners' Cup	FR	Tanzania	Pamba	5–0	0–0	5–0
1993	African Cup Winners' Cup	SR	Lesotho	Arsenal	1–0	1–0	2–0
1993	African Cup Winners' Cup	QF	Sudan	Al Merrikh	5–1	2–1	7–2
1993	African Cup Winners' Cup	SF	Nigeria	El Kanemi Warriors	3–0	0–0	3–0
1993	African Cup Winners' Cup	Final	Ivory Coast	Africa Sports	1–0	1–1	2–1
1994	CAF Super Cup	Final	Egypt	Zamalek	0–1		
1994	African Cup Winners' Cup	FR	Ethiopia	Saint George	w/o (Note: Saint George won on walkover after Al Ahly withdrew.)		
1998	CAF Champions League	FR	Ethiopia	Ethiopian Coffee	2–2	1–1	3–3 (a)
1999	CAF Champions League	FR	Tanzania	Maji Maji	2–0	3–0	5–0
1999	CAF Champions League	SR	Rwanda	Rayon Sports	3–0	0–1	3–1
1999	CAF Champions League	Group A	Nigeria	Shooting Stars	4–1	3–2	2nd
1999	CAF Champions League	Group A	Morocco	Raja CA	0–1	1–1	2nd
1999	CAF Champions League	Group A	Ghana	Hearts of Oak	2–0	1–2	2nd
2000	CAF Champions League	FR	Kenya	Tusker	3–1	0–1	3–2
2000	CAF Champions League	SR	Burundi	Vital'O	3–0	1–2	4–2
2000	CAF Champions League	Group B	Nigeria	Lobi Stars	3–1	1–3	2nd
2000	CAF Champions League	Group B	Senegal	Jeanne d'Arc	3–1	1–1	2nd
2000	CAF Champions League	Group B	Ghana	Hearts of Oak	1–1	1–2	2nd
2001	CAF Champions League	FR	Eritrea	Red Sea	3–0	0–1	3–1
2001	CAF Champions League	SR	Seychelles	Saint Michel United	5–0	1–0	6–0
2001	CAF Champions League	Group B	Algeria	CR Belouizdad	1–0	1–0	2nd
2001	CAF Champions League	Group B	Ivory Coast	ASEC Mimosas	2–1	0–1	2nd
2001	CAF Champions League	Group B	Angola	Petro de Luanda	2–4	3–1	2nd
2001	CAF Champions League	SF	Tunisia	Espérance de Tunis	0–0	1–1	1–1 (a)
2001	CAF Champions League	Final	South Africa	Mamelodi Sundowns	3–0	1–1	4–1
2002	CAF Super Cup	Final	South Africa	Kaizer Chiefs	4–1		
2002	CAF Champions League	FR	Kenya	Oserian Fastac	2–1	0–0	2–1
2002	CAF Champions League	SR	Sudan	Al Merrikh	2–0	1–3	3–3 (a)
2002	CAF Champions League	Group B	Senegal	Jeanne d'Arc	1–2	1–2	4th
2002	CAF Champions League	Group B	DR Congo	TP Mazembe	1–0	0–0	4th
2002	CAF Champions League	Group B	Morocco	Raja CA	3–3	1–2	4th
2003	CAF Cup						
2003	CAF Cup	SR	Libya	Al Nasr	2–0	2–1	4–1
2003	CAF Cup	QF	Nigeria	Enugu Rangers	0–0	0–4	0–4
2004	CAF Champions League	FR	Sudan	Al Hilal	0–1	0–0	0–1
2005	CAF Champions League	FR	Uganda	SC Villa	0–0	6–0	6–0
2005	CAF Champions League	SR	Algeria	USM Alger	2–2	1–0	3–2
2005	CAF Champions League	Group A	Morocco	Raja CA	1–0	1–1	1st
2005	CAF Champions League	Group A	South Africa	Ajax Cape Town	2–0	0–0	1st
2005	CAF Champions League	Group A	Nigeria	Enyimba	2–1	1–0	1st
2005	CAF Champions League	SF	Egypt	Zamalek	2–0	2–1	4–1
2005	CAF Champions League	Final	Tunisia	Étoile du Sahel	3–0	0–0	3–0
2006	CAF Super Cup	Final	Morocco	FAR Rabat	0–0 (4–2 p)		
2006	CAF Champions League	FR	Kenya	Tusker	3–0	2–0	5–0
2006	CAF Champions League	SR	Equatorial Guinea	Renacimiento	4–0	0–0	4–0
2006	CAF Champions League	Group A	Algeria	JS Kabylie	2–0	2–2	2nd
2006	CAF Champions League	Group A	Ghana	Asante Kotoko	4–0	0–0	2nd
2006	CAF Champions League	Group A	Tunisia	CS Sfaxien	2–1	0–1	2nd
2006	CAF Champions League	SF	Ivory Coast	ASEC Mimosas	2–0	1–2	3–2
2006	CAF Champions League	Final	Tunisia	CS Sfaxien	1–1	1–0	2–1
2007	CAF Super Cup	Final	Tunisia	Étoile du Sahel	0–0 (5–4 p)		
2007	CAF Champions League	FR	Zimbabwe	Highlanders	2–0	0–0	2–0
2007	CAF Champions League	SR	South Africa	Mamelodi Sundowns	2–0	2–2	4–2
2007	CAF Champions League	Group B	Tunisia	Espérance de Tunis	3–0	0–1	1st
2007	CAF Champions League	Group B	Ivory Coast	ASEC Mimosas	2–0	1–0	1st
2007	CAF Champions League	Group B	Sudan	Al Hilal	2–0	0–3	1st
2007	CAF Champions League	SF	Libya	Al Ittihad Tripoli	1–0	0–0	1–0
2007	CAF Champions League	Final	Tunisia	Étoile du Sahel	1–3	0–0	1–3
2008	CAF Champions League	FR	Eritrea	Al Tahrir	w/o (Note: Al Ahly won on walkover after Al Tahrir withdrew.)		
2008	CAF Champions League	SR	South Africa	Platinum Stars	2–0	1–2	3–2
2008	CAF Champions League	Group A	Egypt	Zamalek	2–1	2–2	1st
2008	CAF Champions League	Group A	Zimbabwe	Dynamos	2–1	1–0	1st
2008	CAF Champions League	Group A	Ivory Coast	ASEC Mimosas	2–2	0–0	1st
2008	CAF Champions League	SF	Nigeria	Enyimba	1–0	0–0	1–0
2008	CAF Champions League	Final	Cameroon	Coton Sport	2–0	2–2	4–2
2009	CAF Super Cup	Final	Tunisia	CS Sfaxien	2–1		
2009	CAF Champions League	FR	Tanzania	Young Africans	3–0	1–0	4–0
2009	CAF Champions League	SR	Nigeria	Kano Pillars	2–2	1–1	3–3 (a)
2009	CAF Confederation Cup	PO	Angola	Santos	3–0	0–3	3–3 (5–6 p)
2010	CAF Champions League	FR	Zimbabwe	Gunners	2–0	0–1	2–1
2010	CAF Champions League	SR	Libya	Al Ittihad Tripoli	3–0	0–2	3–2
2010	CAF Champions League	Group B	Nigeria	Heartland	2–1	1–1	2nd
2010	CAF Champions League	Group B	Egypt	Ismaily	2–1	2–4	2nd
2010	CAF Champions League	Group B	Algeria	JS Kabylie	1–1	0–1	2nd
2010	CAF Champions League	SF	Tunisia	Espérance de Tunis	2–1	0–1	2–2 (a)
2011	CAF Champions League	FR	South Africa	SuperSport United	2–0	0–1	2–1
2011	CAF Champions League	SR	Zambia	ZESCO United	1–0	0–0	1–0
2011	CAF Champions League	Group B	Algeria	MC Alger	2–0	0–0	3rd
2011	CAF Champions League	Group B	Tunisia	Espérance de Tunis	1–1	0–1	3rd
2011	CAF Champions League	Group B	Morocco	Wydad AC	3–3	1–1	3rd
2012	CAF Champions League	FR	Ethiopia	Ethiopian Coffee	3–0	0–0	3–0
2012	CAF Champions League	SR	Mali	Stade Malien	3–1	0–1	3–2
2012	CAF Champions League	Group B	Ghana	Berekum Chelsea	4–1	1–1	1st
2012	CAF Champions League	Group B	Egypt	Zamalek	1–1	1–0	1st
2012	CAF Champions League	Group B	DR Congo	TP Mazembe	2–1	0–2	1st
2012	CAF Champions League	SF	Nigeria	Sunshine Stars	1–0	3–3	4–3
2012	CAF Champions League	Final	Tunisia	Espérance de Tunis	1–1	2–1	3–2
2013	CAF Super Cup	Final	Congo	AC Léopards	2–1		
2013	CAF Champions League	FR	Kenya	Tusker	2–0	2–1	4–1
2013	CAF Champions League	SR	Tunisia	CA Bizertin	2–1	0–0	2–1
2013	CAF Champions League	Group A	South Africa	Orlando Pirates	0–3	0–0	1st
2013	CAF Champions League	Group A	Congo	AC Léopards	2–1	1–0	1st
2013	CAF Champions League	Group A	Egypt	Zamalek	4–2	1–1	1st
2013	CAF Champions League	SF	Cameroon	Coton Sport	1–1	1–1	2–2 (7–6 p)
2013	CAF Champions League	Final	South Africa	Orlando Pirates	2–0	1–1	3–1
2014	CAF Super Cup	Final	Tunisia	CS Sfaxien	3–2		
2014	CAF Champions League	FR	Tanzania	Young Africans	1–0	0–1	1–1 (4–3 p)
2014	CAF Champions League	SR	Libya	Al Ahly Benghazi	2–3	0–1	2–4
2014	CAF Confederation Cup	PO	Morocco	Difaâ El Jadidi	1–0	1–2	2–2 (a)
2014	CAF Confederation Cup	Group B	Zambia	Nkana	2–0	0–1	1st
2014	CAF Confederation Cup	Group B	Ivory Coast	Séwé Sport	1–0	1–1	1st
2014	CAF Confederation Cup	Group B	Tunisia	Étoile du Sahel	0–0	1–1	1st
2014	CAF Confederation Cup	SF	Cameroon	Coton Sport	2–1	1–0	3–1
2014	CAF Confederation Cup	Final	Ivory Coast	Séwé Sport	1–0	1–2	2–2 (a)
2015	CAF Super Cup	Final	Algeria	ES Sétif	1–1 (5–6 p)		
2015	CAF Champions League	FR	Rwanda	APR	2–0	2–0	4–0
2015	CAF Champions League	SR	Morocco	Moghreb Tétouan	1–0	0–1	1–1 (3–4 p)
2015	CAF Confederation Cup	PO	Tunisia	Club Africain	2–1	1–2	3–3 (5–4 p)
2015	CAF Confederation Cup	Group A	Tunisia	Étoile du Sahel	1–0	0–1	1st
2015	CAF Confederation Cup	Group A	Mali	Stade Malien	1–0	0–0	1st
2015	CAF Confederation Cup	Group A	Tunisia	Espérance de Tunis	3–0	1–0	1st
2015	CAF Confederation Cup	SF	South Africa	Orlando Pirates	3–4	0–1	3–5
2016	CAF Champions League	FR	Angola	Recreativo do Libolo	2–0	0–0	2–0
2016	CAF Champions League	SR	Tanzania	Young Africans	2–1	1–1	3–2
2016	CAF Champions League	Group A	Zambia	ZESCO United	2–2	2–3	3rd
2016	CAF Champions League	Group A	Ivory Coast	ASEC Mimosas	1–2	0–0	3rd
2016	CAF Champions League	Group A	Morocco	Wydad AC	0–0	1–0	3rd
2017	CAF Champions League	FR	South Africa	Bidvest Wits	1–0	0–0	1–0
2017	CAF Champions League	Group D	Morocco	Wydad AC	2–0	0–2	2nd
2017	CAF Champions League	Group D	Cameroon	Coton Sport	3–1	2–0	2nd
2017	CAF Champions League	Group D	Zambia	Zanaco	0–0	0–0	2nd
2017	CAF Champions League	QF	Tunisia	Espérance de Tunis	2–1	2–2	4–3
2017	CAF Champions League	SF	Tunisia	Étoile du Sahel	6–2	1–2	7–4
2017	CAF Champions League	Final	Morocco	Wydad AC	1–1	0–1	1–2
2018	CAF Champions League	FR	Gabon	CF Mounana	4–0	3–1	7–1
2018	CAF Champions League	Group A	Tunisia	Espérance de Tunis	0–0	1–0	1st
2018	CAF Champions League	Group A	Botswana	Township Rollers	3–0	1–0	1st
2018	CAF Champions League	Group A	Uganda	KCCA	4–3	0–2	1st
2018	CAF Champions League	QF	Guinea	Horoya	4–0	0–0	4–0
2018	CAF Champions League	SF	Algeria	ES Sétif	2–0	1–2	3–2
2018	CAF Champions League	Final	Tunisia	Espérance de Tunis	3–1	0–3	3–4
2018–19	CAF Champions League	FR	Ethiopia	Jimma Aba Jifar	2–0	0–1	2–1
2018–19	CAF Champions League	Group D	Tanzania	Simba	5–0	0–1	1st
2018–19	CAF Champions League	Group D	Algeria	JS Saoura	3–0	1–1	1st
2018–19	CAF Champions League	Group D	DR Congo	AS Vita Club	2–0	0–1	1st
2018–19	CAF Champions League	QF	South Africa	Mamelodi Sundowns	1–0	0–5	1–5
2019–20	CAF Champions League	PR	South Sudan	Atlabara	9–0	4–0	13–0
2019–20	CAF Champions League	FR	Equatorial Guinea	Cano Sport	4–0	2–0	6–0
2019–20	CAF Champions League	Group B	Tunisia	Étoile du Sahel	1–0	0–1	2nd
2019–20	CAF Champions League	Group B	Sudan	Al Hilal	2–1	1–1	2nd
2019–20	CAF Champions League	Group B	Zimbabwe	FC Platinum	2–0	1–1	2nd
2019–20	CAF Champions League	QF	South Africa	Mamelodi Sundowns	2–0	1–1	3–1
2019–20	CAF Champions League	SF	Morocco	Wydad AC	3–1	2–0	5–1
2019–20	CAF Champions League	Final	Egypt	Zamalek	2–1		
2021 I	CAF Super Cup	Final	Morocco	RS Berkane	2–0		
2020–21	CAF Champions League	FR	Niger	AS SONIDEP	4–0	1–0	5–0
2020–21	CAF Champions League	Group A	DR Congo	AS Vita Club	2–2	3–0	2nd
2020–21	CAF Champions League	Group A	Tanzania	Simba	1–0	0–1	2nd
2020–21	CAF Champions League	Group A	Sudan	Al Merrikh	3–0	2–2	2nd
2020–21	CAF Champions League	QF	South Africa	Mamelodi Sundowns	2–0	1–1	3–1
2020–21	CAF Champions League	SF	Tunisia	Espérance de Tunis	3–0	1–0	4–0
2020–21	CAF Champions League	Final	South Africa	Kaizer Chiefs	3–0		
2021 II	CAF Super Cup	Final	Morocco	Raja CA	1–1 (6–5 p)		
2021–22	CAF Champions League	SR	Niger	USGN	6–1	1–1	7–2
2021–22	CAF Champions League	Group A	South Africa	Mamelodi Sundowns	0–1	0–1	2nd
2021–22	CAF Champions League	Group A	Sudan	Al Hilal	1–0	0–0	2nd
2021–22	CAF Champions League	Group A	Sudan	Al Merrikh	3–2	3–1	2nd
2021–22	CAF Champions League	QF	Morocco	Raja CA	2–1	1–1	3–2
2021–22	CAF Champions League	SF	Algeria	ES Sétif	4–0	2–2	6–2
2021–22	CAF Champions League	Final	Morocco	Wydad AC	0–2		
2022–23	CAF Champions League	SR	Tunisia	Union Monastirienne	3-0	1-0	4-0
2022–23	CAF Champions League	Group B	Cameroon	Coton Sport	3-0	4-0	2nd
2022–23	CAF Champions League	Group B	Sudan	Al Hilal	3-0	0-1	2nd
2022–23	CAF Champions League	Group B	South Africa	Mamelodi Sundowns	2-2	2-5	2nd
2022–23	CAF Champions League	QF	Morocco	Raja CA	2-0	0-0	2-0
2022–23	CAF Champions League	SF	Tunisia	Espérance de Tunis	1-0	3-0	4-0
2022–23	CAF Champions League	Final	Morocco	Wydad AC	2-1	1-1	3-2
2023-24	CAF Champions League	SR	Ethiopia	Saint George	4-0	3-0	7-0
2023-24	CAF Champions League	Group D	Ghana	Medeama	3-0	1-0	1st
2023-24	CAF Champions League	Group D	Tanzania	Young Africans	1-0	1-1	1st
2023-24	CAF Champions League	Group D	Algeria	CR Belouizdad	0-0	0-0	1st
2023-24	CAF Champions League	QF	Tanzania	Simba	2-0	1-0	3-0
2023-24	CAF Champions League	SF	DR Congo	TP Mazembe	3-0	0-0	3-0
2023-24	CAF Champions League	Final	Tunisia	Espérance de Tunis	1-0	0-0	1-0
2024–25	CAF Champions League	SR	Kenya	Gor Mahia	3-0	3-0	6-0
2024–25	CAF Champions League	Group C	Ivory Coast	Stade d'Abidjan	4-2	3-1	2nd
2024–25	CAF Champions League	Group C	Algeria	CR Belouizdad	6-1	0-1	2nd
2024–25	CAF Champions League	Group C	South Africa	Orlando Pirates	1-2	0-0	2nd
2024–25	CAF Champions League	QF	Sudan	Al Hilal	1-0	1-0	
2024–25	CAF Champions League	SF	South Africa	Mamelodi Sundowns	1-1	0-0	

== Arabian football ==
- PR = Preliminary round
- FR = First round
- SR = Second round
- PO = Play-off round
- QF = Quarter-final
- SF = Semi-final

Season	Competition	Round	Country	Club	Home	Away	Aggregate
1994	Arab Cup Winners' Cup	Group A	Jordan	Al-Faisaly	1–0		1st
1994	Arab Cup Winners' Cup	Group A	Tunisia	AS Marsa	2–1		1st
1994	Arab Cup Winners' Cup	Group A	Qatar	Al-Arabi	3–0		1st
1994	Arab Cup Winners' Cup	SF	Morocco	Olympique de Casablanca	3–2		
1994	Arab Cup Winners' Cup	Final	Saudi Arabia	Al Shabab	1–0		
1995	Arab Cup Winners' Cup	Group B	Saudi Arabia	Al-Riyadh	2–2		3rd
1995	Arab Cup Winners' Cup	Group B	United Arab Emirates	Al-Nasr	3–1		3rd
1995	Arab Cup Winners' Cup	Group B	Syria	Al-Ittihad	1–0		3rd
1995	Arab Cup Winners' Cup	Group B	Tunisia	Club Africain	1–4		3rd
1995	Arab Super Cup	Group A	Saudi Arabia	Al Shabab	1–2		3rd
1995	Arab Super Cup	Group A	Saudi Arabia	Al Hilal	1–0		3rd
1995	Arab Super Cup	Group A	Saudi Arabia	Al-Ittihad Club	0–1		3rd
1996	1996 Arab Club Champions Cup	Group A	Algeria	USM Blida	5–1		1st
1996	1996 Arab Club Champions Cup	Group A	Palestine	Shabab Rafah	7–0		1st
1996	1996 Arab Club Champions Cup	SF	Saudi Arabia	Al Hilal	2–1		
1996	1996 Arab Club Champions Cup	Final	Morocco	Raja	3–1		
1997	Arab Club Champions Cup	Group B	Palestine	Shabab Al-Am'ari	7–0		1st
1997	Arab Club Champions Cup	Group B	Kuwait	Kazma	2–0		1st
1997	Arab Club Champions Cup	Group B	Tunisia	Sfaxien	1–1		1st
1997	Arab Club Champions Cup	SF	Saudi Arabia	Al Ahli	3–0		
1997	Arab Club Champions Cup	Final	Tunisia	Club Africain	1–2		
1997	Arab Super Cup	Group A	Jordan	Al-Faisaly	4–0		Champions
1997	Arab Super Cup	Group A	Morocco	Olympique Club de Khouribga	2–3		Champions
1997	Arab Super Cup	Group A	Morocco	Raja	2–0		Champions
1998	Arab Super Cup	Group A	Tunisia	Club Africain	0–0		Champions
1998	Arab Super Cup	Group A	Saudi Arabia	Al Shabab	2–0		Champions
1998	Arab Super Cup	Group A	Algeria	MC Oran	2–0		Champions

== Other competitions ==
=== CAF Super Cup ===
16 January 1994	Zamalek (Egypt)	1–0	(Egypt) Al-Ahly	Johannesburg
	Mansour 86'	Report		Stadium: First National Bank Stadium; Attendance: 12,000; Referee: Petros Mathabela (South Africa)

15 March 2002	Al Ahly (Egypt)	4–1	(South Africa) Kaizer Chiefs	Cairo
18:00 UTC+2	Bebo 7'; Ghaly 30'; El-Hadary 65'; Sayed 69'	Report	Nzama 15'	Stadium: International Stadium; Referee: Abdel Hakim Shelmani (Libya)

24 February 2006	Al Ahly (Egypt)	0–0 (4–2 p)	(Morocco) FAR Rabat	Cairo
18:00 UTC+2		Report		Stadium: International Stadium; Referee: Koman Coulibaly (Mali)
	Penalties
	El-Nahhas (penalty scored); Osama (penalty scored); Shady (penalty scored); El-Shater (penalty scored)		(penalty missed) Boubou; (penalty scored) El Maaroufi; (penalty scored) Lotfi; (penalty missed) El Fadly

18 February 2007	Al Ahly (Egypt)	0–0 (5–4 p)	(Tunisia) ES Sahel	Addis Ababa
16:00 UTC+2		Report	Meriah (red card) 79'	Stadium: Addis Ababa Stadium; Referee: Lassina Pare (Burkina Faso)
	Penalties
	Shady (penalty scored); Flávio (penalty scored); Moteab (penalty scored); Stakoza (penalty scored); El-Nahhas (penalty scored)		(penalty scored) Ghezal; (penalty missed) Melliti; (penalty scored) Traoui; (penalty scored) Gilson; (penalty scored) Chikhaoui

6 February 2009	Al-Ahly (Egypt)	2–1	(Tunisia) CS Sfaxien	Cairo
17:30 GMT	Flávio 46', 69'	Report	Koissy 62'	Stadium: International Stadium; Attendance: 60,000; Referee: Daniel Bennett (South Africa)

23 February 2013	Al-Ahly (Egypt)	2–1	(Republic of the Congo) AC Léopards	Alexandria
18:30 UTC+2	Rabia 55'; Barakat 70'	Report	Ndey 77'	Stadium: Borg El Arab Stadium; Attendance: 10,000; Referee: Bakary Gassama (Gambia)

20 February 2014	Al-Ahly (Egypt)	3–2	(Tunisia) CS Sfaxien	Cairo
19:00 UTC+2	Gedo 23'; Gamal 55', 67'	Report	Maâloul 63' (pen.); Ben Youssef 77'	Stadium: International Stadium; Attendance: 45,000; Referee: Noumandiez Doué (Ivory Coast)

21 February 2015	ES Sétif (Algeria)	1–1 (6–5 p)	(Egypt) Al-Ahly	Blida
16:00 UTC+1	Ziaya 68'	Report	Moteab 90+4'	Stadium: Stade Mustapha Tchaker; Attendance: 15,000; Referee: Noumandiez Doué (Ivory Coast)
	Penalties
	Delhoum (penalty scored); Mellouli (penalty scored); Benyettou (penalty scored); Dagoulou (penalty scored); Belameiri (penalty scored); Lamri (penalty scored)		(penalty scored) Zakaria; (penalty scored) Said; (penalty scored) Moteab; (penalty scored) Samir; (penalty scored) Trezeguet; (penalty missed) Ali

28 May 2021	Al Ahly (Egypt)	2–0	(Morocco) RS Berkane	Doha
16:00 GMT (19:00 UTC+3)	Sherif 57'; S. Mohsen 82'	Report		Stadium: Jassim bin Hamad Stadium; Attendance: 2,900; Referee: Mustapha Ghorbal (Algeria)

22 December 2021	Al Ahly (Egypt)	1–1 (6–5 p)	(Morocco) Raja CA	Al Rayyan
17:00 GMT (20:00 UTC+3)	Taher 90'	Report	Ibrahim 13' (o.g.)	Stadium: Ahmed bin Ali Stadium; Referee: Jean-Jacques Ndala Ngambo (DR Congo)
	Penalties
	Maâloul (penalty scored); Benoun (penalty scored); Tau (penalty scored); Abdel Kader (penalty scored); Taher (penalty scored); Tawfik (penalty scored)		(penalty scored) Zrida; (penalty scored) El Wardi; (penalty scored) Hadhoudi; (penalty scored) Benhalib; (penalty scored) Moutouali; (penalty missed) Madkour

=== FIFA Club World Cup ===
11 December 2005 Quarter-finals	Al-Ittihad (Saudi Arabia)	1–0	(Egypt) Al Ahly	Tokyo
19:20	Noor 78'	Report		Stadium: Olympic Stadium; Attendance: 28,281; Referee: Graham Poll (England)

16 December 2005 Fifth place play-off	Al Ahly (Egypt)	1–2	(Australia) Sydney FC	Tokyo
19:20	Moteab 45'	Report	Yorke 35'; Carney 66'	Stadium: Olympic Stadium; Attendance: 15,951; Referee: Toru Kamikawa (Japan)

10 December 2006 Quarter-finals	Auckland City (New Zealand)	0–2	(Egypt) Al Ahly	Toyota City
19:20		Report	Flávio 51'; Aboutrika 73'	Stadium: Toyota Stadium; Attendance: 29,922; Referee: Khalil Al Ghamdi (Saudi Arabia)

13 December 2006 Semi-finals	Al Ahly (Egypt)	1–2	(Brazil) Internacional	Tokyo
19:20	Flávio 54'	Report	Pato 23'; Luiz Adriano 72'	Stadium: Olympic Stadium; Attendance: 33,690; Referee: Subkhiddin Mohd Salleh (Malaysia)

17 December 2006 Third place	Al Ahly (Egypt)	2–1	(Mexico) América	Yokohama
16:20	Aboutrika 42', 79'	Report	Cabañas 59'	Stadium: International Stadium Yokohama; Attendance: 51,641; Referee: Jerome Damon (South Africa)

13 December 2008 Quarter-finals	Al Ahly (Egypt)	2–4 (a.e.t.)	(Mexico) Pachuca	Tokyo
13:45	Pinto 28' (o.g.); Flávio 44'	Report	Montes 47'; Giménez 72', 110'; Álvarez 98'	Stadium: National Stadium; Attendance: 30,158; Referee: Ravshan Irmatov (Uzbekistan)

18 December 2008 Fifth place	Al Ahly (Egypt)	0–1	(Australia) Adelaide United	Yokohama
16:30		Report	Cristiano 7'	Stadium: International Stadium Yokohama; Attendance: 35,154; Referee: Peter O'Leary (New Zealand)

9 December 2012 Quarter-finals	Sanfrecce Hiroshima (Japan)	1–2	(Egypt) Al Ahly	Toyota
19:30	Satō 32'	Report	Hamdy 15'; Aboutrika 57'	Stadium: Toyota Stadium; Attendance: 27,314; Referee: Carlos Vera (Ecuador)

12 December 2012 Semi-finals	Al Ahly (Egypt)	0–1	(Brazil) Corinthians	Toyota
19:30		Report	Guerrero 30'	Stadium: Toyota Stadium; Attendance: 31,417; Referee: Marco Rodríguez (Mexico)

16 December 2012 Third place	Al Ahly (Egypt)	0–2	(Mexico) Monterrey	Yokohama
16:30		Report	Corona 3'; Delgado 66'	Stadium: International Stadium Yokohama; Attendance: 56,301; Referee: Peter O'Leary (New Zealand)

14 December 2013 Quarter-finals	Guangzhou Evergrande (China)	2–0	(Egypt) Al Ahly	Agadir
16:00	Elkeson 49'; Conca 67'	Report		Stadium: Stade Adrar; Attendance: 34,579; Referee: Sandro Ricci (Brazil)

18 December 2013 Fifth place	Al Ahly (Egypt)	1–5	(Mexico) Monterrey	Marrakesh
16:30	Moteab 8'	Report	Cardozo 3'; Delgado 22', 65'; López 27'; Suazo 45' (pen.)	Stadium: Stade de Marrakech; Attendance: 35,219; Referee: Mark Geiger (United States)

4 February 2021 Quarter-finals	Al-Duhail (Qatar)	0–1	(Egypt) Al Ahly	Al Rayyan
20:30		Report	El Shahat 30'	Stadium: Education City Stadium; Referee: Mario Escobar (Guatemala)

8 February 2021 Semi-finals	Al Ahly (Egypt)	0–2	(Germany) Bayern Munich	Al Rayyan
21:00		Report	Lewandowski 17', 86'	Stadium: Ahmed bin Ali Stadium; Attendance: 7,982; Referee: Mohammed Abdulla Hassan Mohamed (United Arab Emirates)

11 February 2021 Third place	Al Ahly (Egypt)	0–0 (3–2 p)	(Brazil) Palmeiras	Al Rayyan
18:00		Report		Stadium: Education City Stadium; Attendance: 5,606; Referee: Maguette N'Diaye (Senegal)
	Penalties
	Benoun (penalty scored); El Solia (penalty missed); M. Mohsen (penalty missed); Hany (penalty scored); Ajayi (penalty scored)		(penalty missed) Rony; (penalty missed) Luiz Adriano; (penalty scored) Gustavo Scarpa; (penalty scored) Gómez; (penalty missed) Felipe Melo

5 February 2022 Second round	Al Ahly (Egypt)	1–0	(Mexico) Monterrey	Abu Dhabi
20:30	Hany 53'	Report		Stadium: Al Nahyan Stadium; Attendance: 9,396; Referee: Chris Beath (Australia)

8 February 2022 Semi-finals	Palmeiras (Brazil)	2–0	(Egypt) Al Ahly	Abu Dhabi
20:30	Veiga 39'; Dudu 49'	Report		Stadium: Al Nahyan Stadium; Attendance: 11,902; Referee: Clément Turpin (France)

12 February 2022 Third place	Al Hilal (Saudi Arabia)	0–4	(Egypt) Al Ahly	Abu Dhabi
17:00		Report	Ibrahim 8', 17'; Abdel Kader 40'; El Solia 64'	Stadium: Al Nahyan Stadium; Attendance: 9,008; Referee: Clément Turpin (France)

1 February 2023 First round	Al Ahly (Egypt)	3–0	(New Zealand) Auckland City	Tangier
21:00	Hussein El Shahat 45+2'; Sherif 56'; Tau 86'	Report	Adam Mitchell (red card) 90+7'	Stadium: Ibn Batouta Stadium

4 February 2023 second round	Seattle Sounders FC (United States)	0–1	(Egypt) Al Ahly	Tangier
18:00		Report	Magdy 88'	Stadium: Ibn Batouta Stadium; Attendance: 30,589; Referee: Anthony Taylor (England)

8 February 2023 Semi-finals	Al Ahly (Egypt)	v	(Spain) Real Madrid	Rabat
20:00		Report		Stadium: Prince Moulay Abdellah Stadium; Referee: Andrés Matonte (Uruguay)

=== Afro-Asian Club Championship ===
2 September 1989 First leg	Yomiuri (Japan)	1–3	(Egypt) Al Ahly	Tokyo
--:-- UTC+9	Takeda 3'		Hassan 18', 77'; Saad 62'	Stadium: Nishigaoka Soccer Stadium

22 September 1989 Second leg	Al Ahly (Egypt)	1–0	(Japan) Yomiuri	Cairo
--:-- UTC+2	Abouzeid 40'			Stadium: Cairo International Stadium

== Statistics ==
=== By season ===
Information correct as of 30 May 2022.
Key

W	Winners
RU	Runners-up

- Pld = Played
- W = Games won
- D = Games drawn
- L = Games lost
- F = Goals for
- A = Goals against
- Grp = Group stage
- PR = Preliminary round
- R1 = First round
- R2 = Second round
- PR = Play-off round
- R16 = Round of 16
- QF = Quarter-final
- SF = Semi-final

Al Ahly SC record in African football by season
Season	Competition	Pld	W	D	L	GF	GA	GD	Round
1976	African Cup of Champions Clubs	2	1	0	1	1	3	−2	R2
1977	African Cup of Champions Clubs	6	3	1	2	12	7	+5	QF
1978	African Cup of Champions Clubs	Walkover							
1981	African Cup of Champions Clubs	6	3	2	1	13	5	+8	SF
1982	African Cup of Champions Clubs	10	5	3	2	18	5	+13	W
1983	African Cup of Champions Clubs	10	5	3	2	14	4	+10	RU
1984	African Cup Winners' Cup	10	4	4	2	14	8	+6	W
1985	African Cup Winners' Cup	8	5	1	2	15	4	+11	W
1986	African Cup Winners' Cup	10	5	2	3	16	5	+11	W
1987	African Cup of Champions Clubs	10	5	2	3	18	6	+12	W
1988	Afro-Asian Club Championship	2	2	0	0	4	1	+3	W
1988	African Cup of Champions Clubs	8	5	1	2	14	6	+8	SF
1990	African Cup of Champions Clubs	4	2	2	0	8	0	+8	R2
1991	African Cup of Champions Clubs	4	3	0	1	6	3	+3	QF
1992	African Cup Winners' Cup	6	2	2	2	6	6	+0	QF
1993	African Cup Winners' Cup	10	7	3	0	19	3	+16	W
1994	CAF Super Cup	1	0	0	1	0	1	−1	RU
1994	African Cup Winners' Cup	Walkover							R1
1998	CAF Champions League	2	0	2	0	3	3	+0	R1
1999	CAF Champions League	10	6	1	3	19	8	+11	Grp
2000	CAF Champions League	10	4	2	4	17	13	+4	Grp
2001	CAF Champions League	14	8	3	3	23	10	+13	W
2002	CAF Super Cup	1	1	0	0	4	1	+3	W
2002	CAF Champions League	10	3	3	4	12	13	−1	Grp
2003	CAF Cup	4	2	1	1	4	5	−1	QF
2004	CAF Champions League	2	0	1	1	0	1	−1	R1
2005	CAF Champions League	14	9	5	0	23	5	+18	W
2005	FIFA Club World Cup	2	0	0	2	1	3	−2	6th
2006	CAF Super Cup	1	0	1	0	0	0	+0	W
2006	CAF Champions League	14	8	4	2	24	7	+17	W
2006	FIFA Club World Cup	3	2	0	1	5	3	+2	3rd
2007	CAF Super Cup	1	0	1	0	0	0	+0	W
2007	CAF Champions League	14	7	6	1	16	9	+7	RU
2008	CAF Champions League	14	7	5	2	19	12	+7	W
2008	FIFA Club World Cup	2	0	0	2	2	5	−3	6th
2009	CAF Super Cup	1	1	0	0	2	1	+1	W
2009	CAF Champions League	4	2	2	0	7	3	+4	R2
2009	CAF Confederation Cup	2	0	2	0	3	3	+0	PR
2010	CAF Champions League	12	5	2	5	15	14	+1	SF
2011	CAF Champions League	10	3	5	2	10	7	+3	Grp
2012	CAF Champions League	14	7	5	2	22	13	+9	W
2012	FIFA Club World Cup	3	1	0	2	2	4	−2	4th
2013	CAF Super Cup	1	1	0	0	2	1	+1	W
2013	CAF Champions League	14	6	7	1	16	11	+5	W
2013	FIFA Club World Cup	2	0	0	2	1	7	−6	6th
2014	CAF Super Cup	1	1	0	0	3	2	+1	W
2014	CAF Champions League	4	2	0	2	3	5	−2	R2
2014	CAF Confederation Cup	12	6	3	3	12	8	+4	W
2015	CAF Super Cup	1	0	1	0	0	0	+0	RU
2015	CAF Champions League	4	3	0	1	5	1	+4	R2
2015	CAF Confederation Cup	10	5	1	4	12	9	+3	SF
2016	CAF Champions League	10	3	5	2	11	9	+2	Grp
2017	CAF Champions League	14	6	5	3	20	12	+8	RU
2018	CAF Champions League	14	9	2	3	26	12	+14	RU
2018–19	CAF Champions League	8	4	1	3	12	8	+4	QF
2019–20	CAF Champions League	13	9	3	1	23	7	+16	W
2020	FIFA Club World Cup	3	1	1	1	1	2	−1	3rd
2021 (May)	CAF Super Cup	1	1	0	0	2	0	+2	W
2020–21	CAF Champions League	13	9	3	1	26	6	+20	W
2021	FIFA Club World Cup	3	2	0	1	5	2	+3	3rd
2021 (Dec)	CAF Super Cup	1	0	1	0	1	1	+0	W
2021–22	CAF Champions League	13	6	4	3	23	13	+10	RU
Total		413	207	114	92	616	327	+289	

=== Overall record ===
As of 30 May 2022:

CAF competitions
Competition	Seasons	Played	Won	Drawn	Lost	Goals For	Goals Against	Last season played
Champions League	34	311	158	90	63	479	241	2021–22
CAF Confederation Cup	3	24	11	6	7	27	20	2015
CAF Cup Winners' Cup (defunct)	6	44	23	12	9	70	26	1994
CAF Cup (defunct)	1	4	2	1	1	4	5	2003
CAF Super Cup	10	10	5	4	1	15	8	2021 (Dec)
FIFA Club World Cup	7	18	6	1	11	17	26	2021
Afro-Asian Club Championship	1	2	2	0	0	4	1	1988
Total	62	413	207	114	92	616	327	
