= Sextuple (association football) =

Sporting achievement

The term sextuple is mainly used in the sports press for winning six important national and international titles in sport, especially in football, within one season or calendar year.

During a football season, clubs typically take part in a number of national competitions, such as in a league and one or more cup competitions, and sometimes in continental competitions. Winning multiple competitions is considered a particularly significant achievement. Doubles and triples tend to be long-remembered achievements, but they occur with a certain frequency, while winning four or more trophies in a season is much less common. In the 2010s, the terms quadruple, quintuple, and sextuple were sometimes used to refer to four, five, and six trophies in a single season.

Paris Saint-Germain are the most recent winners of the sextuple, having done so in 2025.

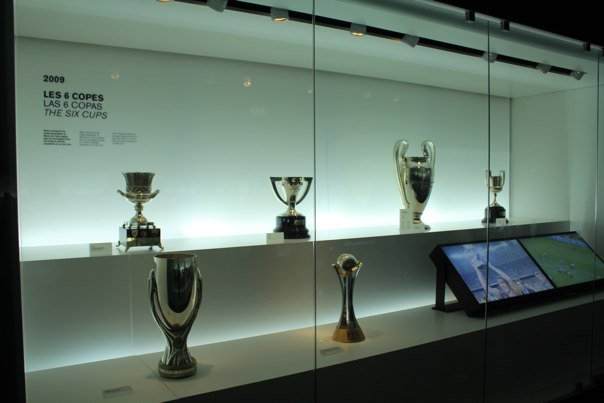
The six trophies won by Barcelona in 2009 on display in the Camp Nou museum.

The six trophies won by Bayern Munich in 2020 exhibited in the Allianz Arena.

== Sextuple in continental football ==
In terms of football, the sextuple means that a club wins six official competitions in the same season or calendar year.

The national titles in a continent are:

- winning national league
- winning national cup
- winning national supercup and/or winning national league cup

The international titles in a continent are:

- winning top competition such as UEFA Champions League in Europe or Copa Libertadores in South America
- winning continental super cup such as UEFA Super Cup in Europe or Recopa Sudamericana in South America

The international titles worldwide are:

- winning FIFA Intercontinental Cup and/or winning FIFA Club World Cup

Currently, only the clubs from the top-flight leagues in Africa, Europe or South America can have a chance to achieve a sextuple due to the presence of continental super cups in those continents.

== Sextuple winners ==
Currently, Barcelona, Bayern Munich and Paris Saint-Germain are the three teams that have achieved the sextuple. Each of them won six titles during an annual season. Barcelona and Bayern won the FIFA Club World Cup and PSG won the FIFA Intercontinental Cup as annual world champions title.

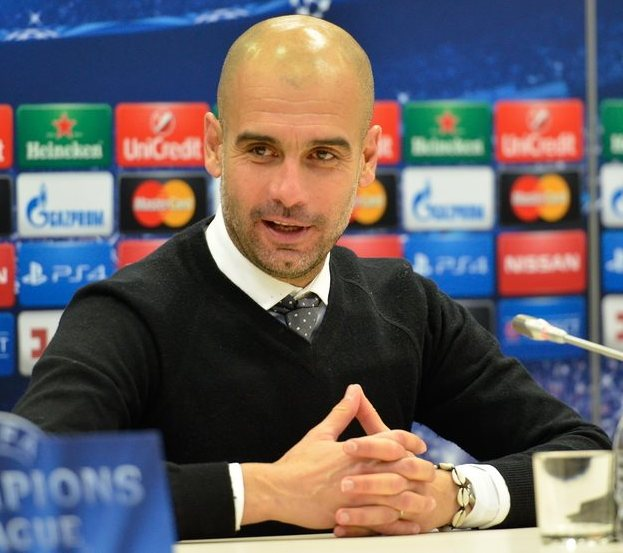
Pep Guardiola, former Barcelona manager, who achieved the first international sextuple in 2009.

=== 2009: (Spain) Barcelona ===
Coach: (Spain) Pep Guardiola

Year	Titles	Record / final score
2009	La Liga	87 points (27–6–5)
2009	Copa del Rey	4–1 vs Athletic Bilbao
2009	UEFA Champions League	2–0 vs (England) Manchester United
2009	Supercopa de España	5–1 vs Athletic Bilbao (agg.)
2009	UEFA Super Cup	1–0 vs (Ukraine) Shakhtar Donetsk
2009	FIFA Club World Cup	2–1 vs (Argentina) Estudiantes (a.e.t.)

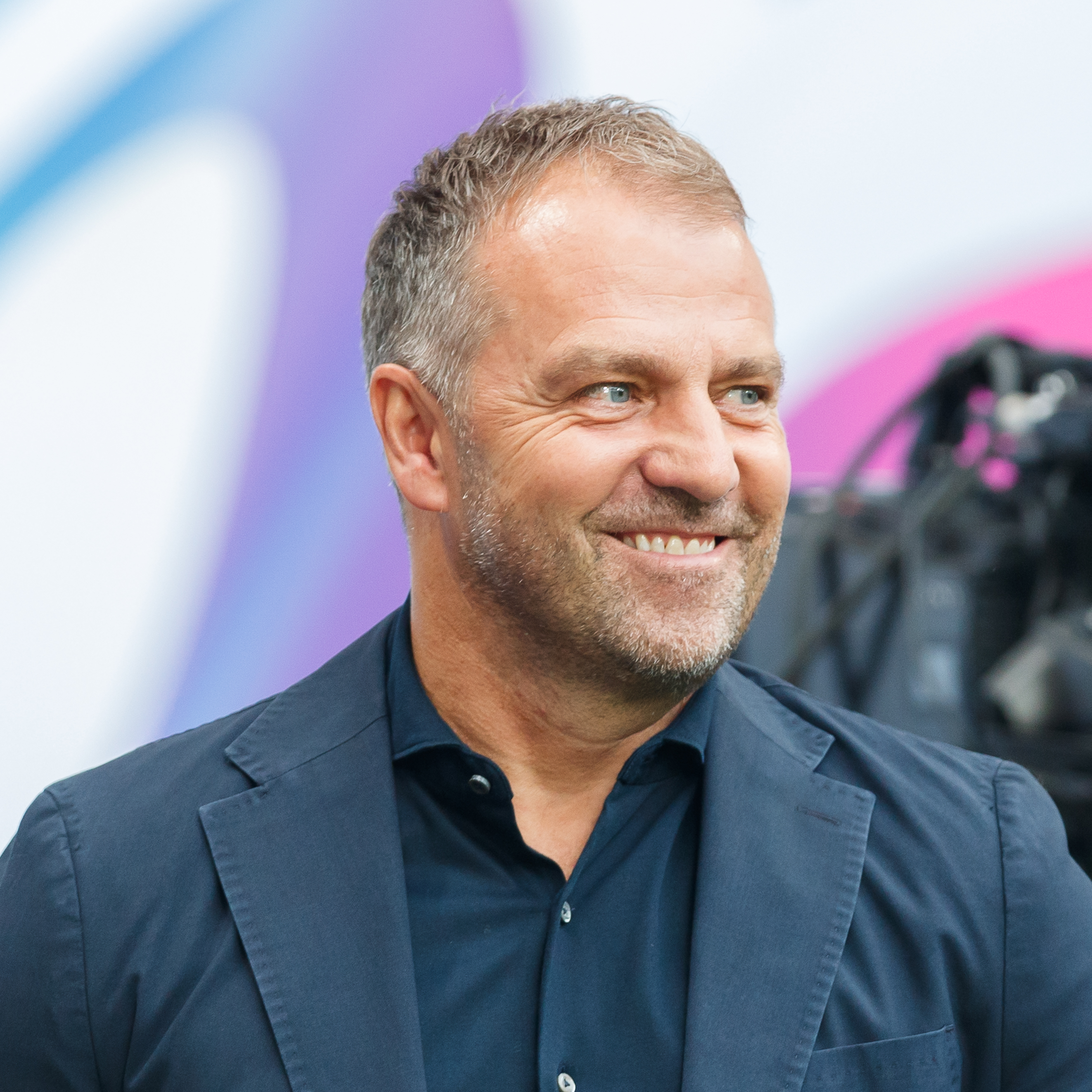
Hansi Flick, former Bayern Munich manager, who achieved the second international sextuple in 2020.

=== 2020: (Germany) Bayern Munich ===
Coach: (Germany) Hansi Flick

Year	Titles	Record / final score
2020	Bundesliga	82 points (26–4–4)
2020	DFB-Pokal	4–2 vs Bayer Leverkusen
2020	UEFA Champions League	1–0 vs (France) Paris Saint-Germain
2020	UEFA Super Cup	2–1 vs (Spain) Sevilla (a.e.t.)
2020	DFL-Supercup	3–2 vs Borussia Dortmund
2020	FIFA Club World Cup (Note: Played in February 2021, but still considered to be part of the 2020 football season.)	1–0 vs (Mexico) UANL

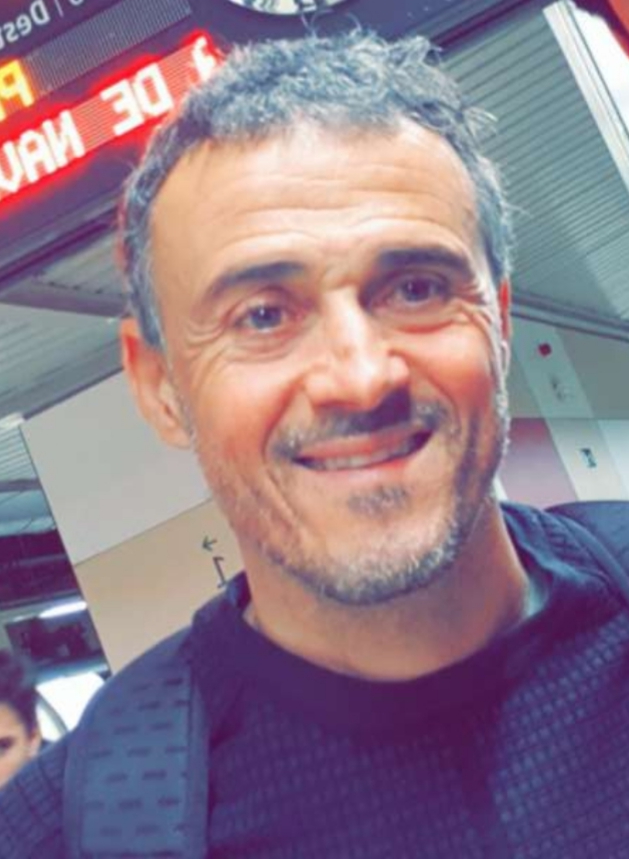
Luis Enrique, current Paris Saint-Germain manager, who achieved the third international sextuple in 2025.

=== 2025: (France) Paris Saint-Germain ===
Coach: (Spain) Luis Enrique

Year	Titles	Record / final score
2025	Ligue 1	84 points (26–6–2)
2025	Coupe de France	3–0 vs Reims
2025	UEFA Champions League	5–0 vs (Italy) Inter Milan
2025	UEFA Super Cup	2–2 vs (England) Tottenham Hotspur (4–3 p)
2025	FIFA Intercontinental Cup	1–1 vs (Brazil) Flamengo (2–1 p)
2025	Trophée des Champions	1–0 vs Monaco

== Missed sextuples ==
The following teams could not win the sixth official competition after a quintuple and thus missed out on the sextuple:

- 1995: (Netherlands) Ajax – won the Eredivisie, the Dutch Supercup, the UEFA Champions League, the UEFA Super Cup and the Intercontinental Cup, but lost the quarter-finals of the KNVB Cup against Feyenoord.
- 2006: Al Ahly – won the Egyptian Premier League, the Egypt Cup, the Egyptian Super Cup, the CAF Champions League and the CAF Super Cup, but lost the semi-finals of the FIFA Club World Cup against Internacional.
- 2010: (Italy) Inter Milan – won the Serie A, the Coppa Italia, the Supercoppa Italiana, the UEFA Champions League and the FIFA Club World Cup, but lost the UEFA Super Cup against Atlético Madrid.
- 2011: (Spain) Barcelona – won La Liga, the Supercopa de España, the UEFA Champions League, the UEFA Super Cup and the FIFA Club World Cup, but lost the final of the Copa del Rey against Real Madrid.
- 2013: (Germany) Bayern Munich – won the Bundesliga, the DFB-Pokal, the UEFA Champions League, the UEFA Super Cup and the FIFA Club World Cup, but lost the DFL-Supercup against Borussia Dortmund.
- 2015: (Spain) Barcelona – won La Liga, the Copa del Rey, the UEFA Champions League, the UEFA Super Cup and the FIFA Club World Cup, but lost the Supercopa de España against Athletic Bilbao.
- 2017: (Spain) Real Madrid – won La Liga, the Supercopa de España, the UEFA Champions League, the UEFA Super Cup and the FIFA Club World Cup, but lost the quarter-finals of the Copa del Rey against Celta Vigo.
- 2022: (Spain) Real Madrid – won La Liga, the Supercopa de España, the UEFA Champions League, the UEFA Super Cup and the FIFA Club World Cup, but lost the quarter-finals of the Copa del Rey against Athletic Bilbao.
- 2023: (England) Manchester City – won the Premier League, the FA Cup, the UEFA Champions League, the UEFA Super Cup and the FIFA Club World Cup, but lost the FA Community Shield against Arsenal.
- 2024: (Spain) Real Madrid – won La Liga, the Supercopa de España, the UEFA Champions League, the UEFA Super Cup and the FIFA Intercontinental Cup, but lost the round of 16 of the Copa del Rey against Atlético Madrid.

== Seventh and eighth title ==
On 11 February 2021, just minutes after Bayern Munich won the FIFA Club World Cup final to secure a sextuple, former Bayern coach Pep Guardiola jokingly challenged the side to a match against previous sextuple winners Barcelona, a team that was managed by Guardiola at the time. As these two sides were the only ones to have achieved a sextuple in football history, he suggested that they could play for a seventh title.

It is technically possible for certain teams to win seven trophies in a single calendar year; for example, a top-flight English club can win the standard six trophies that are of similar calibre and format to the ones achieved in previous sextuples, but can also add a seventh title by winning the EFL Cup, a secondary national cup that does not exist in most countries, which only have one domestic cup competition.

Since 2025, there is an opportunity for any European, African or South American top division league club to win seven trophies, as well as eight trophies for top-flight clubs in some countries (such as England, Egypt, Japan, Portugal, and Scotland, where a league cup exists), if they win the FIFA Intercontinental Cup in the same year in which the revamped quadrennial FIFA Club World Cup took place.

Paris Saint-Germain missed the opportunity to achieve the feat in 2025; they won the Ligue 1, the Coupe de France, the Trophée des Champions, and the Champions League, but then lost the 2025 FIFA Club World Cup final to Chelsea before securing the UEFA Super Cup and the FIFA Intercontinental Cup.

Also, teams specifically from Argentina are able to fight for up to eight titles, or even more, because of recent competitions being added. The most they can win is 14, in case of being triumphant in the Apertura and Clausura cups, the League title, the Trofeo de Campeones, Copa Argentina, Supercopa Argentina, Supercopa Internacional, Recopa de Campeones, Libertadores, Recopa Sudamericana, Americas' Derby, Challenger Cup, Intercontinental, and Club World Cup (with the important clarification of this situation only possible in case of this scheme being maintained, at least until 2029).

== See also ==
- Treble
- Double
- List of association football teams to have won four or more trophies in one season
- List of football clubs by competitive honours won
