= 2009 CAF Super Cup =

Al-Ahly	CS Sfaxien
(Egypt)	(Tunisia)
2	1
- Date: 6 February 2009
- Venue: International Stadium, Cairo
- Referee: Daniel Bennett (South Africa)
- Attendance: 60,000

The 2009 CAF Super Cup was the 17th CAF Super Cup, an annual football match in Africa organized by the Confederation of African Football (CAF), between the winners of the previous season's two CAF club competitions, the CAF Champions League and the CAF Confederation Cup. The match was contested by 2008 CAF Champions League winners, Al-Ahly, and 2008 CAF Confederation Cup winners, CS Sfaxien at the International Stadium in Cairo on 6 February 2009.

Al-Ahly won the match 2–1, with two goals from Angolan striker Flávio, and won the title for the record fourth time (having won the Super Cup in 2002, 2006 and 2007), all of them under the management of Manuel José. CS Sfaxien finished as runners-up second year in a row.

Overall, this was the seventh Super Cup triumph for Egyptian clubs and the fifth time that a Tunisian club finished runners-up.

== Teams ==
Team	Qualification	Previous participation (bold indicates winners)
(Egypt) Al Ahly	2008 CAF Champions League winner	1994, **2002**, **2006**, **2007**
(Tunisia) CS Sfaxien	2008 CAF Confederation Cup winner	2008

== Match details ==
6 February 2009
17:30 GMT

Al-Ahly (Egypt)	2 – 1	(Tunisia) CS Sfaxien
Flávio 46', 69'	Report	Koissy 62'

International Stadium, Cairo
Attendance: 60,000
Referee: Daniel Bennett (South Africa)

**Al-Ahly**	**CS Sfaxien**

AL-AHLY:
GK	(Egypt) Amir Abdelhamid
DF	(Egypt) Ahmad El-Sayed
DF	(Egypt) Wael Gomaa
DF	(Egypt) Shady Mohamed (c)
DF	(Egypt) Ahmed Fathy
DF	(Angola) Gilberto		(substituted off) 83'
MF	(Egypt) Ahmed Hassan		(substituted off) 75'
MF	(Egypt) Hossam Ashour	(yellow card) 84'
MF	(Egypt) Moataz Eno
MF	(Egypt) Mohamed Barakat
FW	(Angola) Flávio		(substituted off) 88'
Substitutes:
DF	(Egypt) Sayed Moawad		(substituted on) 83'
FW	(Egypt) Ahmed Hassan Farag		(substituted on) 75'
DF	(Egypt) Ahmad Sedik		(substituted on) 88'
Manager:
(Portugal) Manuel José

CS SFAXIEN:
GK	(Tunisia) Jassem Khalloufi
DF	(Tunisia) Amir Hadj Massaoued
DF	(Tunisia) Aymen Ben Amor
DF	(Tunisia) Hamdi Rouid
DF	(Tunisia) Issam Merdassi
MF	(Tunisia) Haitham Mrabet
MF	(Tunisia) Chadi Hammami	(substituted off) 85'
MF	(Guinea) Naby Soumah
MF	(Tunisia) Abdelkarim Nafti
FW	(Tunisia) Hamza Younes
FW	(Mauritania) Dominique da Silva	Substituted off
Substitutes:
MF	(Cameroon) Ousmaïla Baba	(substituted on) 85'
DF	(Ivory Coast) Blaise Koissy	Substituted on
Manager:
(Tunisia) Ghazi Ghrairi

== Champions ==
CAF Super Cup 2009

**Al-Ahly**
**Fourth Title**

== See also ==
- 2008 CAF Champions League
- 2008 CAF Confederation Cup
