= 2007 CAF Super Cup =

Al Ahly	ES Sahel
(Egypt)	(Tunisia)
0	0
- Al Ahly won 5-4 on penalties
- Date: 18 February 2007
- Venue: Addis Ababa Stadium, Addis Ababa
- Referee: Lassina Pare (Burkina Faso)

The 2007 CAF Super Cup was the 15th CAF Super Cup, an annual football match in Africa organized by the Confederation of African Football (CAF), between the winners of the previous season's two CAF club competitions, the African Cup of Champions Clubs and the CAF Confederation Cup.

The match took place on 18 February 2007, on neutral stadium at Addis Ababa Stadium in Addis Ababa, Ethiopia, celebrating the CAF's 50th anniversary, between Al Ahly, the 2006 CAF Champions League winner, and ES Sahel, the 2006 CAF Confederation Cup winner. Al-Ahly won the match by penalty shout-out 5–4, to retain the title, as the second team to win the tournament for three times after Zamalek SC.

== Teams ==
Team	Qualification	Previous participation (bold indicates winners)
(Egypt) Al Ahly	2006 CAF Champions League winner	1994, **2002**, **2006**
(Tunisia) ES Sahel	2006 CAF Confederation Cup winner	**1998**, 2004

== Match details ==
18 February 2007
16:00 UTC+2

Al Ahly (Egypt)	0 - 0	(Tunisia) ES Sahel
	Report	Meriah (red card) 79'
Penalties
Shady (penalty scored); Flávio (penalty scored); Moteab (penalty scored); Stakoza (penalty scored); El-Nahhas (penalty scored)	5 – 4	(penalty scored) Ghezal; (penalty missed) Melliti; (penalty scored) Traoui; (penalty scored) Gilson; (penalty scored) Chikhaoui

Addis Ababa Stadium
Referee: Lassina Pare (Burkina Faso)

**Al-Ahly**	**Étoile du Sahel**

GK	1	(Egypt) Essam El-Hadary
RB	2	(Egypt) Islam El-Shater		(substituted off) 102'
CB	4	(Egypt) Emad El-Nahhas
CB	7	(Egypt) Shady Mohamed
CB	26	(Egypt) Wael Gomaa
LB	29	(Egypt) Ahmad Shedid Qinawi		(substituted off) 87'
CM	25	(Egypt) Hossam Ashour	(yellow card) ?'
CM	17	(Tunisia) Anis Boujelbene
CM	20	(Egypt) Mohamed Shawky		(substituted off) 71'
CF	9	(Egypt) Emad Moteab
CF	23	(Angola) Flavio Amado
Substitutes:
CF	16	(Egypt) Abdelhamid Hassan		(substituted on) 71'
CM	24	(Egypt) Ahmad Hassan Stakoza		(substituted on) 87'
RB	31	(Egypt) Ahmad Adel		(substituted on) 102'
Manager:
(Portugal) Manuel José de Jesus

GK
RB
CB
CB
LB
CM
CM
AM
AM
CF
CF
Substitutes:
DF
MF
MF
Manager:
(Tunisia) Faouzi Benzarti

(Tunisia) Aymen Mathlouthi
(Tunisia) Saber Ben Frej	(yellow card) ?'
(Tunisia) Mejdi Ben Mohamed
(Tunisia) Saif Ghezal	(yellow card) ?'
(Tunisia) Mehdi Meriah	Sent off (straight red)
(Tunisia) Mohamed Ali Nafkha
(Ghana) Moussa Narry
(Tunisia) Aymen Soltani	(yellow card) ?'	(substituted off) 75'
(Tunisia) Yassine Chikhaoui
(Cape Verde) Gilson Manuel Silva Alves
(Tunisia) Amine Chermiti	(substituted off) 90'
(Tunisia) Mejdi Traoui	(substituted on) 73'
(Benin) Mouritala Ogunbiyi	(substituted on) 75'
(Tunisia) Khaled Melliti	(substituted on) 90'
