= Emad El Nahhas =

Egyptian football manager (born 1976)

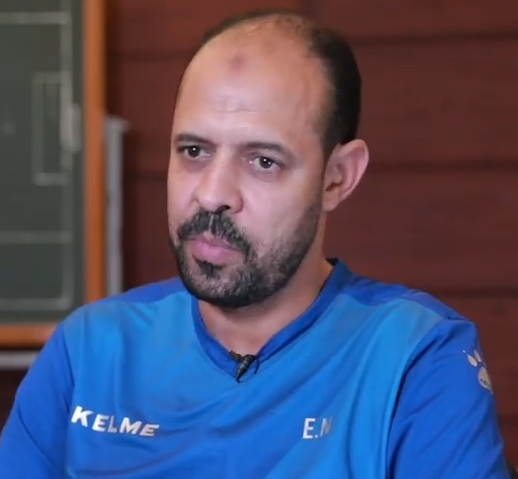
- El Nahhas in 2019

Personal information
- Date of birth: 15 February 1976 (age 50)
- Place of birth: Minya, Egypt
- Height: 1.84 m (6 ft 0 in)
- Position: Centre-back

Team information
- Current team: Al Masry SC

Senior career*
Years	Team	Apps	(Gls)
1996–1998	Aswan	60	(3)
1998–2003	Ismaily	150	(18)
2003–2004	Al-Nassr	10	(0)
2004–2009	Al Ahly	120	(8)

International career
2003–2009	Egypt	43	(1)

Managerial career
- 2009–2010: Al Ahly (staff)
- 2010–2011: Al-Merrikh (sporting director)
- 2014–2016: Aswan
- 2017: El Sharkia
- 2017: El Raja
- 2018: Tanta
- 2018–2021: El Mokawloon
- 2022: Al Ittihad
- 2023: Tala'ea El Gaish
- 2023–2024: Al Tahaddy
- 2024: El Mokawloon
- 2025: Al Ahly (caretaker)
- 2025: Al Ahly (caretaker)
- 2025–2026: Al Zawraa
- 2026-: Al Masry SC
- * Club domestic league appearances and goals

Emad El Nahhas (Arabic: عِمَاد النُّحَاس; born 15 February 1976) is an Egyptian football coach and former player, last in charge of Al-Zawraa SC. El-Nahhas finished his career at Al Ahly after retiring, undertaking training several times.

== Playing career ==
=== Aswan SC ===
El Nahhas began his football career at the Maghagha Youth Center, where he played alongside players such as Ahmed Hassan. In 1996, at age 21, he moved to Aswan SC after being approved by coach Mohamed Amer.

=== Ismaily SC ===
After two successful seasons with Aswan, El Nahhas joined Ismaily SC in 1998, despite interest from other clubs including Al Ahly, Zamalek, and Al-Masry. His move was approved by German coach Frank Engel.

El Nahhas helped Ismaily win the Egyptian Premier League title in the 2001–02 season, scoring five goals that season. As a result, Ismaily qualified for the 2003 CAF Champions League and reached the final. El Nahhas captained the team in the first leg of the final against Nigerian club Enyimba, which ended in a 2–0 defeat. Ismaily won the return leg 1–0 in Ismailia but lost on aggregate, finishing as runners-up.

=== Al-Nassr ===
After five and a half seasons with Ismaily, El Nahhas joined Saudi club Al-Nassr on loan for six months in 2004. His contract with Ismaily expired in the summer of 2004 after his return from the loan.

=== Al Ahly ===
In June 2004, Al Ahly signed El Nahhas on a three-year deal worth EGP 400,000 per season. His move angered some Ismaily fans, who believed that his loan to Al-Nassr was a step toward joining Al Ahly. El Nahhas denied having signed with Al Ahly before his loan to Saudi Arabia.

El Nahhas joined Al Ahly during a team rebuild led by Portuguese coach Manuel José. Other key signings included Mohamed Aboutrika, Mohamed Barakat, and Islam El-Shater, forming the core of a squad that would go on to win numerous titles.

Despite being a defender, El Nahhas scored eight goals in the 2005–06 season. These included a hat-trick against Al Ittihad Alexandria in a 6–0 win, a solo goal against Renacimiento in the 2006 CAF Champions League, and a goal against Zamalek in the Egypt Cup final (3–0 win). He also scored the decisive penalty in the shootout that secured Al Ahly the African Super Cup against Étoile du Sahel.

El Nahhas is known for his strong character and sportsmanship on the field.

== Coaching career ==
=== Al Ahly ===
After retiring, El Nahhas began his coaching career as assistant football director at Al Ahly for the 2009–10 season. He then became vice president of the youth sector before resigning in May 2014.

=== Al-Merrikh SC ===
In 2010, he took on the role of sporting director at Al-Merrikh SC, a position he held for one year.

=== Aswan SC ===
El Nahhas took his first managerial position in July 2014 with Aswan SC, then in the Egyptian Second Division. In the 2014–15 season, he led the team to promotion to the Premier League after an 11-year absence. Aswan finished 15th in the top tier the following season, avoiding relegation by 10 points. However, a poor start to the 2016–17 season led to his resignation in November 2016.

=== El Sharkia SC ===
On 8 February 2017, El Nahhas was appointed head coach of El Sharkia SC. After 17 games and a series of poor results, he left the position on 31 July 2017.

=== El Raja SC ===
He took over as head coach of El Raja SC on 28 September 2017, replacing Khaled Al-Qashmakh. El Nahhas was dismissed on 24 December 2017 due to poor results, with the team bottom of the league table.

=== Tanta SC ===
El Nahhas became the coach of Tanta SC on 1 March 2018. After only seven games and a disappointing run, he left on 27 April 2018.

=== Al Mokawloon Al Arab SC ===
He took charge of Al Mokawloon Al Arab SC on 24 October 2018, succeeding Alaa Nabil. He resigned from the role on 29 December 2021.

=== Tala'ea El Gaish SC ===
On 9 February 2023, El Nahhas was appointed head coach of Tala'ea El Gaish SC during the latter stages of the 2022–23 season.

=== Al Ahly ===
In April 2025, El Nahhas returned to Al Ahly SC as interim coach, guiding the team to their 45th Egyptian Premier League title at the end of the 2024–25 season. In September that year, he was reappointed as interim head coach following the dismissal of José Riveiro.

== Managerial statistics ==
As of match played 15 June 2025

Managerial record by team and tenure
Team	From	To	Record					Ref.
Team	From	To	P	W	D	L	Win %	Ref.
Aswan SC	1 July 2014	21 November 2016	74	28	19	27	37.8	
El Sharkia SC	8 February 2017	31 July 2017	17	3	6	8	17.6	
El Raja SC	28 September 2017	24 December 2017	13	1	5	7	7.7	
Tanta SC	1 March 2018	27 April 2018	7	0	2	5	0.0	
El Mokawloon	23 October 2018	29 December 2021	70	30	20	20	42.9	
Al Ittihad	20 March 2022	8 August 2022	17	5	4	8	29.4	
Al Tahaddy	6 December 2023	30 June 2024	14	4	3	7	28.6	
El Mokawloon	29 June 2024	5 August 2024	5	1	2	2	20.0	
Al Ahly (interim)	27 April 2025	1 June 2025	6	6	0	0	100.0	
Al Ahly (interim)	1 September 2025	8 October 2025	5	4	1	0	80.0	
Total			228	82	62	84	36.0	—

== Honours ==
=== As a player ===
Ismaily:

- Egyptian Premier League: 2001–02
- Egyptian Cup: 1999–2000

Al Ahly:

- Egyptian Premier League: 2004–05, 2005–06, 2006–07, 2007–08, 2008–09
- The third place: FIFA Club World Cup 2006
- CAF Champions League: 2005, 2006, 2008
- African Super Cup: 2006, 2007, 2009
- Egyptian Cup: 2006, 2007
- Egyptian Super Cup: 2005, 2006, 2007, 2008

=== As a manager ===
Aswan SC:

- Egyptian Second Division: 2014–15 Egyptian Second Division Group A (Promoted)

Al Ahly:

- Egyptian Premier League: 2024–25
