= Essam El Hadary =

Egyptian footballer (born 1973)

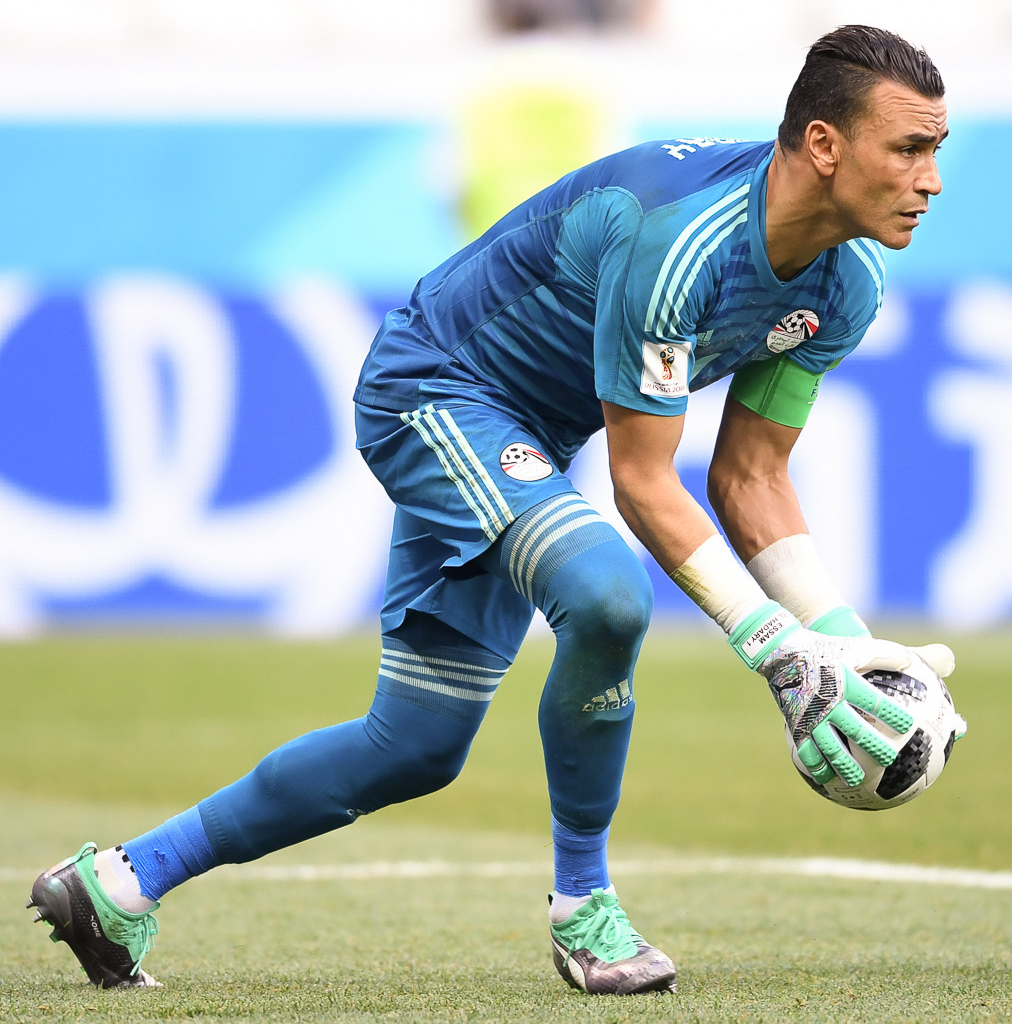
- El Hadary with Egypt at the 2018 FIFA World Cup

Personal information
- Full name: Essam Kamal Tawfiq El Hadary
- Date of birth: 15 January 1973 (age 53)
- Place of birth: Kafr El Battikh, Damietta, Egypt
- Height: 1.90 m (6 ft 3 in)
- Position: Goalkeeper

Youth career
- 1991–1993: Damietta

Senior career*
Years	Team	Apps	(Gls)
1993–1996	Damietta	58	(0)
1996–2008	Al Ahly	412	(1)
2008–2009	Sion	32	(0)
2009–2010	Ismaily	20	(0)
2010–2011	Zamalek	4	(0)
2011–2013	Al Merreikh	92	(0)
2012	→ Al-Ittihad Alexandria (loan)	1	(0)
2013–2014	Wadi Degla	14	(0)
2014–2015	Ismaily	38	(0)
2015–2017	Wadi Degla	57	(0)
2017–2018	Al-Taawoun	25	(1)
2018–2019	Ismaily	15	(0)
2019–2020	Nogoom	3	(0)
Total		771	(2)

International career
1996–2018	Egypt	159 (Note: "157 appearances according to some sources, as FIFA, unlike the Egyptian Football Association, does not recognise two appearances El Hadary made in a 2–0 friendly away win over Qatar in Doha on 28 December 2012, and in a 1–0 friendly home win over Kenya in Aswan on 30 August 2014.)	(0)

Managerial career
- 2021–2022: Egypt (goalkeeper coach)
- 2022–2023: Egypt U23 (goalkeeper coach)
- 2023–2024: Syria (goalkeeper coach)
Medal record
Men's football
Representing Egypt
Africa Cup of Nations
Winner	1998 Burkina Faso
Winner	2006 Egypt
Winner	2008 Ghana
Winner	2010 Angola
Runner-up	2017 Gabon
- * Club domestic league appearances and goals

Essam Kamal Tawfiq El Hadary (Arabic: عصام كمال توفيق الحضري; born 15 January 1973) is an Egyptian goalkeeping coach and former professional football goalkeeper. Nicknamed the "High Dam", El Hadary has been described as amongst the greatest Egyptian players of all time.

El Hadary spent the largest portion of his club career with Al Ahly, with whom he won seven Egyptian Premier Leagues, four Egypt Cups, four Egyptian Super Cups, three CAF Champions Leagues, three CAF Super Cups, one Arab Club Champions Cup, and two Arab Super Cups.

Third on the list of all-time appearances for Egypt, El Hadary made 159 international appearances for his nation between 1996 and 2018. He won the Africa Cup of Nations four times, and was named the tournament's best goalkeeper on three occasions. In the 2018 World Cup, at the age of 45 years and 161 days, he became the oldest player in history to play in a World Cup match.

After his retirement, he was very close to being the goalkeeping coach of Étoile Sahel of Tunisia, to be part of the technical staff under the leadership of Jorvan Vieira after agreeing to sign the contract, but his mother's illness forced him to step back in the end.

== Club career ==
El Hadary was born in Kafr El Battikh, Damietta. His father was a craftsman who owned his own workshop making furniture. El Hadary took up playing football without his parents' knowledge, washing his muddy clothes in a local river after playing in order to avoid them knowing. He was spotted by his local football team before being signed by Second Division club Damietta at age 17. In his first training session, he was offered goalkeeping gloves, having previously never worn a pair, but refused to wear them and would run the 7 kilometres (4.3 mi) to training every day. He made his first team debut for Damietta in 1993 at the age of 20, and after two seasons signed a pre-contract with Egyptian champions Al Ahly. In 12 years at the Cairo club he won eight Egyptian Premier League titles, four Egypt Cups, four Egyptian Super Cups, four CAF Champions League titles, three CAF Super Cups, one Arab Club Champions Cup, and two Arab Super Cups.

Swiss club FC Sion announced that they had signed El Hadary on a four-year contract in February 2008, despite objections from his club, Al Ahly, due to the fact that he was still under contract with them. El Hadary was fined and suspended by Al Ahly, before world governing body FIFA gave permission for Sion to complete the deal.

In 2009, FIFA suspended El Hadary and penalized Sion, even though he had already decided to return to Egypt. In July, while his suspension was stayed by the Court of Arbitration for Sport (CAS), El Hadary moved to Egyptian Premier League side Ismaily. In 2010, his four month suspension was upheld by the CAS, and in January a Swiss civil court upheld the ban and fines and additionally ordered him to pay FIFA's court costs.

In December 2010, after a brief stint with Zamalek, he played for the Cairo giants for only one season. In 2011, El Hadary moved to Sudanese club Al-Merreikh. After boycotting practices due to a pay dispute, he was loaned to Al-Ittihad Alexandria, but after a stadium riot in Port Said led to the suspension of the 2011–12 Egyptian Premier League season he returned to Sudan again.

After his contract with Al-Merreikh expired, he returned to Egypt, joining Wadi Degla in 2013, moving back to Ismaily in 2014, and returning again to Wadi Degla in 2015. Throughout this period, he continued to be acclaimed one of the best footballers ever to play for Egypt or anywhere in Africa; in 2013 he was included in Bleacher Report's "50 Greatest African Players of All Time" list, ranked number 6.

In 2017, an argument with a teammate led to El Hadary being thrown off the Wadi Degla team briefly. In June of that year, he signed for Al-Taawoun to become the first foreign goalkeeper to play in Saudi Arabia. On 10 December, he scored from a stoppage-time penalty in a 4–0 victory over Al-Ettifaq, becoming the oldest player to score in the Saudi Pro League, aged 44 years and 329 days.

On 2 July 2018, it was confirmed that El Hadary had joined Ismaily for the third time in his career. On 28 January 2019, El Hadary signed with Nogoom. However, he left the club following their relegation at the end of the season.

On 18 November 2020, El Hadary announced his official retirement in order to start his coaching career.

== International career ==
El Hadary represented Egypt a total of 159 times from his debut in 1996 until his retirement in 2018. He won the African Cup of Nations four times with his country. He was chosen as the best goalkeeper in the 2006 African Cup of Nations, held in homeland Egypt, in the 2008 African Cup of Nations, held in Ghana and for the 2010 African Cup of Nations, held in Angola.

In January 2013, his agent tweeted that El Hadary had retired from international football after being benched for a run of games, being the 23rd most capped international player in history and also the player with most African Cup of Nations titles. He returned to the national team in a match against Bosnia Herzegovina on 5 March 2014, winning 2–0.

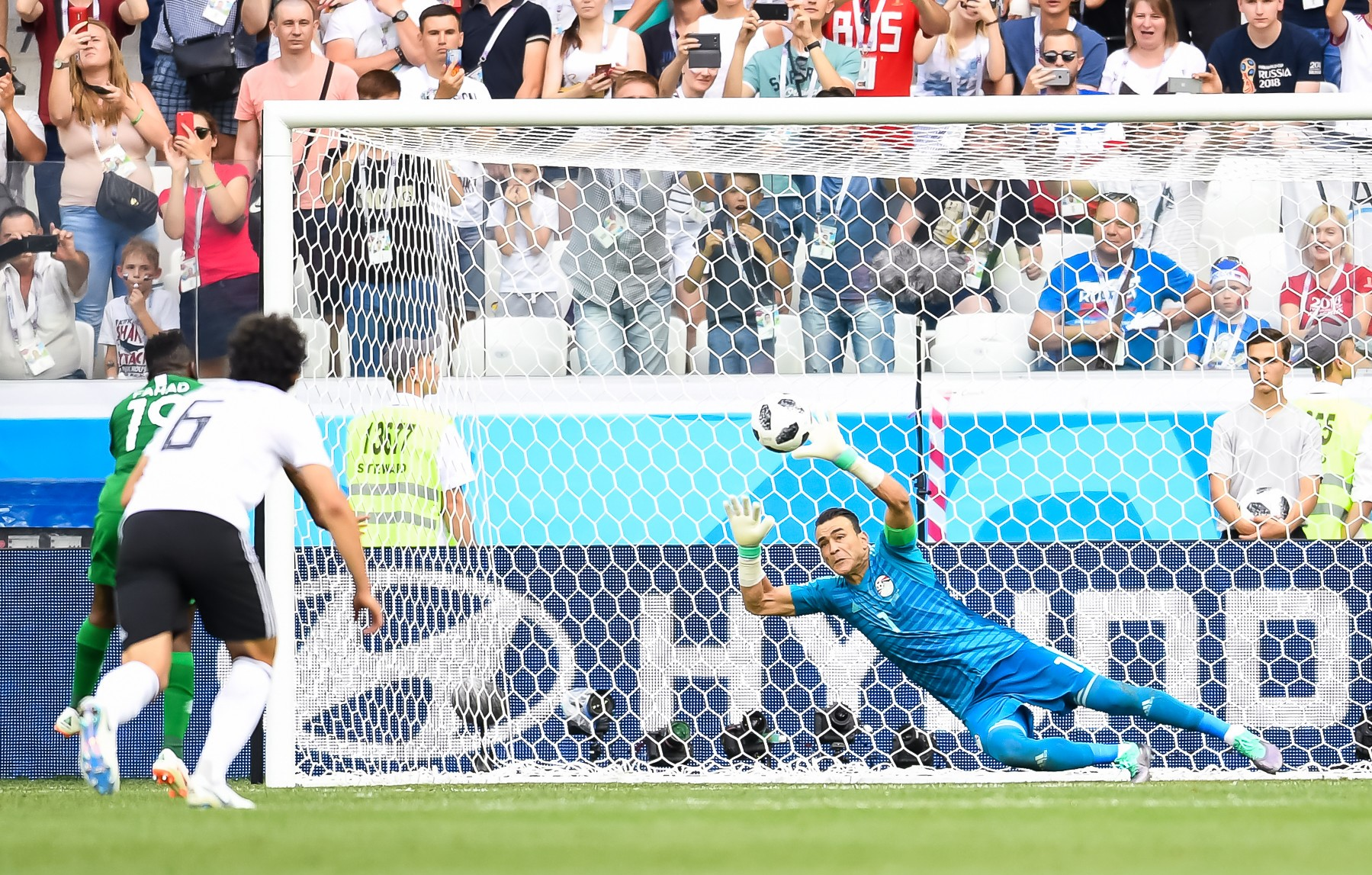
El Hadary saving a penalty shot from Saudi Arabia's Fahad Al-Muwallad at the 2018 FIFA World Cup

On 4 June 2016, El Hadary played the full 90 minutes in a 2–0 win against Tanzania which secured Egypt's qualification for 2017 Africa Cup of Nations. On 17 January 2017, two days after his 44th birthday, he became the oldest player to ever appear in an Africa Cup of Nations match after replacing Ahmed El-Shenawy in Egypt's first match of the tournament then on 5 February 2017 on a final match of the tournament against Cameroon he was then 44 years and 21 days. On 1 February 2017, El Hadary saved two penalties as Egypt defeated Burkina Faso 4–3 in a penalty shoot-out to advance to the 2017 Africa Cup of Nations Final.

In June 2018, at the age of 45, he was named in Egypt's 23-man squad for the 2018 FIFA World Cup in Russia. He was the oldest of all players selected for the tournament, beating the record by Colombian goalkeeper Faryd Mondragón in the previous edition of the tournament. On 25 June, El Hadary was handed a start in Egypt's final group match against Saudi Arabia to become the oldest player ever to play in and debut at a World Cup at the age of 45 years and 161 days, once again breaking Mondragón's record of 43 years and three days. El Hadary stopped a penalty kick in the first half of the match, but subsequently conceded from a second penalty just before half time; his team eventually lost the game 2–1 after conceding a goal in stoppage time.

On 7 August 2018, El Hadary announced his international retirement at the age of 45. In November 2019, the FIFA World Football Museum exhibited El Hadary's gloves of his World Cup match for being the tournament's oldest player and the first African goalkeeper ever to save a penalty.

== Post-playing career ==
In September 2021, El Hadary became the goalkeeping coach of Egypt national team until March 2022, before joining Rogério Micale's Egypt U23 staff in August 2022. In February 2023, he became part of Héctor Cúper's coaching staff of Syria national team.

== Career statistics ==
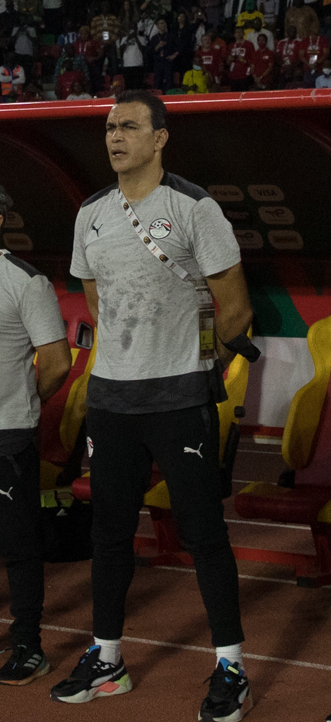
El Hadary, the goalkeeper coach for the Egyptian national team, during the 2021 Africa Cup of Nations.

=== International ===
Appearances and goals by national team and year
National team	Year	Apps	Goals
Egypt	1996	2	0
Egypt	1997	9	0
Egypt	1998	4	0
Egypt	1999	6	0
Egypt	2000	3	0
Egypt	2001	6	0
Egypt	2002	14	0
Egypt	2003	3	0
Egypt	2004	6	0
Egypt	2005	5	0
Egypt	2006	11	0
Egypt	2007	9	0
Egypt	2008	18	0
Egypt	2009	16	0
Egypt	2010	11	0
Egypt	2011	2	0
Egypt	2012	13 (Note: "12 appearances according to some sources, as, unlike the Egyptian FA, FIFA does not recognise an appearance El Hadary made in a 2–0 friendly away win over Qatar in Doha on 28 December 2012.)	0
Egypt	2013	1	0
Egypt	2014	4 (Note: "3 appearances according to some sources, as, unlike the Egyptian FA, FIFA does not recognise an appearance El Hadary made in a 1–0 friendly home win over Kenya in Aswan on 30 August 2014.)	0
Egypt	2015	0	0
Egypt	2016	4	0
Egypt	2017	9	0
Egypt	2018	3	0
Total		159	0

== Honours ==
Al Ahly

- Egyptian Premier League: 1996–97, 1997–98, 1998–99, 1999–2000, 2004–05, 2005–06, 2006–07
- Egypt Cup: 2000–01, 2002–03, 2005–06, 2006–07
- Egyptian Super Cup: 2003, 2005, 2006, 2007
- CAF Champions League: 2001, 2005, 2006
- CAF Super Cup: 2002, 2006, 2007

Sion

- Swiss Cup: 2008–09

Al Merreikh

- Sudan Premier League: 2011, 2013
- Sudan Cup: 2012, 2013

Egypt

- Africa Cup of Nations: 1998, 2006, 2008, 2010
- Pan Arab Games: 2007

Egypt Military

- World Military Cup: 2001

Egypt U23

- All-Africa Games: 1995

Individual

- CAF Champions League Best Goalkeeper: 2001, 2005, 2006
- Africa Cup of Nations Best Goalkeeper: 2006, 2008, 2010

== See also ==
- List of footballers with 100 or more caps
- Football in Egypt
