= Ahmad Hassan Stakoza =

Egyptian footballer (born 1979)

Ahmed Hassan Estakoza
Personal information
- Full name: Ahmed Hassan "Estakoza" Abdelrahman Nasr
- Date of birth: 12 April 1979 (age 47)
- Place of birth: Cairo, Egypt
- Height: 1.67 m (5 ft 6 in)
- Position: Defensive midfielder

Youth career
- 1992-1996: Sharqiya

Senior career*
Years	Team	Apps	(Gls)
1996–2004	Sharqiya	82	(56)
2004–2007	Al Ahly	37	(12)
2007–2008	Ittihad	10	(1)
2008–2010	Tersana	29	(2)
2010	El-Entag El-Harby	0	
- * Club domestic league appearances and goals

Ahmad Hassan "Estakoza" (Arabic: أحمد حسن; born 12 April 1979) is an Egyptian footballer. In June 2010, he joined the Egyptian Premier League side, El-Entag El-Harby. He plays as a Playmaker

== Career ==
He joined Al Ahly in July 2004 from al-Shrqya sporting club. He did not take his chance in the first season. In the 2006-2007 season he appeared in some matches for Al Ahly and scored the winning goal against Tanta FC.

He joined Ittihad From Al Ahly in summer 2007.

== Honours ==
Club

- Winner of CAF Champions League 2006
- Winner of CAF Champions League 2005
- Winner of Egyptian League (2005–2006)
- Winner of Egyptian League (2004–2005)
- Winner of African Super Cup 2007
- Winner of African Super Cup 2006
- Winner of Egyptian Soccer Cup 2006
- Winner of Egyptian Super Cup 2006
- Winner of Egyptian Super Cup 2005
