= 2006 Egypt Cup final =

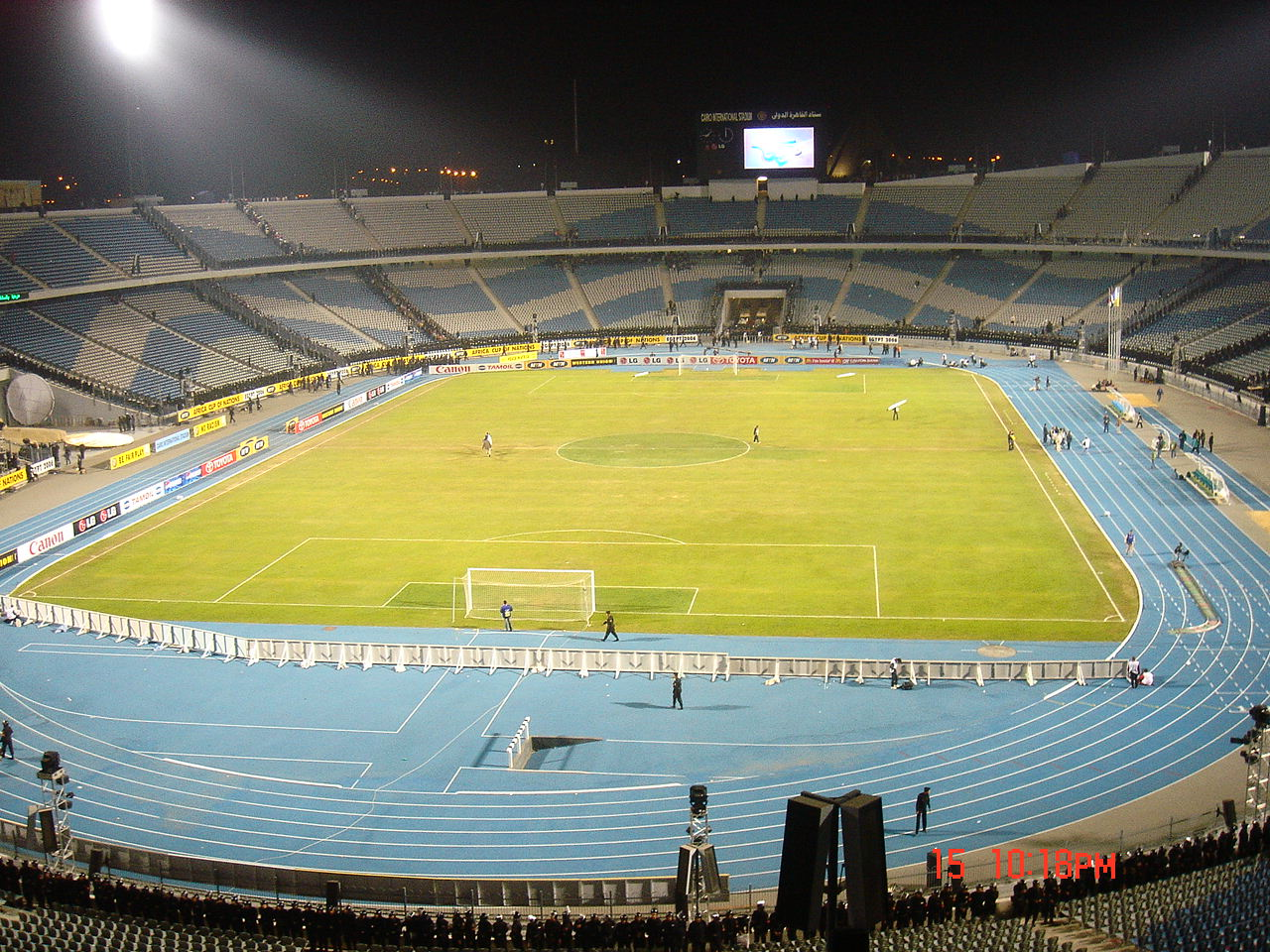
- Cairo Stadium Stadium hosted the final
- Event: 2005–06 Egypt Cup
Al Ahly	Zamalek
3	0
- Date: 16 June 2006
- Venue: Cairo Stadium, Cairo
- Referee: Terje Hauge (Norway)

The 2006 Egypt Cup final was the 74th final of the Egypt Cup, Africa's oldest football cup competition. It was played on 16 June 2006 at Cairo Stadium in Cairo and was contested between Al Ahly and Zamalek. The winners would have entered the 2007 CAF Confederation Cup if they had not already qualified. However, since Al Ahly and Zamalek already qualified for the 2007 CAF Champions League, the Confederation Cup entry went to Ismaily, as they achieved the fourth place in the league.

== Route to the final ==
Zamalek		Round	Al Ahly
Opponent	Result	2005–06 Egypt Cup	Opponent	Result
Olympic Club	4–1	Round of 32
Al Mokawloon Al Arab	5–2	Round of 16	Al Ittihad	1–0
ENPPI	2–1	Quarterfinals	Suez Cement	3–0
Ismaily	1–1 (4–2 on penalties)	Semifinals	Haras El-Hodood	1–0

== Details ==
16 June 2006

Al Ahly	3–0	Zamalek
Emad Moteab 20' 69'; Emad El Nahhas 36'

Cairo International Stadium, Cairo
Referee: Terje Hauge (Norway)

GK	1	(Egypt) Essam El Hadary
CB	26	(Egypt) Wael Gomaa
CB	4	(Egypt) Emad El Nahhas
CB	5	(Egypt) Ahmad El-Sayed
LWB	3	(Egypt) Mohamed Abdelwahab
CM	24	(Egypt) Ahmed Hassan	(substituted off) 42'
DM	17	(Egypt) Mohamed Shawky	(substituted off) 88'
CM	14	(Egypt) Hassan Mostafa	(substituted off) 76'
RWB	8	(Egypt) Mohamed Barakat
AM	22	(Egypt) Mohamed Aboutrika
FW	9	(Egypt) Emad Moteab
Substitutes:
DM	25	(Egypt) Hossam Ashour	(substituted in) 42'
FW	14	(Ghana) Akwetey Mensah	(substituted in) 76'
CM	30	(Egypt) Hady Khashaba	(substituted in) 88'
Manager:
(Portugal) Manuel José

GK	25	(Egypt) Abdel Monsef
CB	5	(Egypt) Mahmoud Mahmoud	(red card) 45'
CB	15	(Egypt) Wael El-Quabbani
CB	27	(Egypt) Moataz Eno
LWB	13	(Egypt) Tarek El-Sayed
CM	8	(Egypt) Alaa Abdel Ghany	Booked
CM	20	(Egypt) Abdel Hamid		(substituted off) 41'
RWB	22	(Egypt) Youssef Hamdi		(substituted off) 79'
AM	11	(Egypt) Mohamed Abo el alaa
FW	24	(Egypt) Abdel Halim	Booked	(substituted off) 46'
FW	10	(Egypt) Walid Abdel-Latif
Substitutes:
FW	18	(Egypt) Gamal Hamza		(substituted in) 41'
CM	21	(Egypt) Ahmed Bakry		(substituted in) 46'
FW	26	(Nigeria) Sunny Ekeh Kingsley		(substituted in) 79'
Manager:
(Portugal) Manuel Cajuda

Match rules

- 90 minutes.
- 30 minutes of extra time if necessary.
- Penalty shoot-out if scores still level.
- Seven named substitutes, of which up to three may be used.
