= Islam El-Shater =

Egyptian footballer (born 1976)

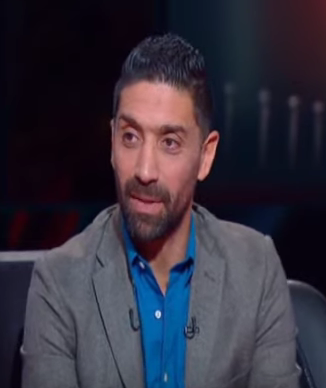

Personal information
- Full name: Islam Mahmoud Mohamed El-Sayed El-Shater
- Date of birth: November 16, 1976 (age 49)
- Place of birth: Alexandria, Egypt
- Height: 1.78 m (5 ft 10 in)
- Positions: Right back; wingback

Youth career
- Olympic

Senior career*
Years	Team	Apps	(Gls)
1994–1999	Olympic	?	(?)
1999–2003	Al-Ismaily	?	(8)
2003–2004	Al-Zamalek	1	(0)
2004-2004	Ittihad Jeddah	?	(?)
2004–2008	Al Ahly	64	(1)
2008–2011	Haras El Hodood	67	(2)
2011–2012	Petrojet	12	(0)

International career^{‡}
1995–2005	Egypt	28	(0)
- * Club domestic league appearances and goals as of 1 July 2008 ‡ National team caps and goals as of 1 July 2008

Islam Mahmoud Mohamed El-Sayed El-Shater (Egyptian Arabic: إِسْلَام مَحْمُود مُحَمَّد السَّيِّد الشَّاطِر) (born November 16, 1976) is a retired Egyptian footballer.

== Honours ==
Ismaily

- Egyptian Premier League: 2001–02
- Egypt Cup: 2000

Zamalek

- Egyptian Premier League: 2003–04

Al Ahly

- Egyptian Premier League: 2004–05, 2005–06, 2006–07, 2007–08
- Egypt Cup: 2006, 2007
- Egyptian Super Cup: 2005, 2006, 2007
- CAF Champions League: 2005, 2006
- CAF Super Cup: 2006, 2007

Haras El Hodood

- Egypt Cup: 2009, 2009–10
- Egyptian Super Cup: 2009
