= 2006 CAF Champions League group stage =

- Dates: 15 July – 17 September 2006

Tournament statistics
- Matches played: 24
- Goals scored: 49 (2.04 per match)

The group stage of the 2006 CAF Champions League was played from 15 July to 17 September 2006. A total of eight teams competed in the group stage, the group winners and runners-up advance to the Knockout stage playing semifinal rounds before the final.

== Format ==
In the group stage, each group was played on a home-and-away round-robin basis. The winners and the runners-up of each group advanced to the Knockout stage.

== Groups ==
Key to colours in group tables
Group winners and runners-up advance to the Knockout stage

=== Group A ===
Pos	Team	Pld	W	D	L	GF	GA	GD	Pts	Qualification
1	(Tunisia) CS Sfaxien	6	4	0	2	9	7	+2	12	Advance to knockout stage
2	(Egypt) Al Ahly	6	3	2	1	10	4	+6	11	Advance to knockout stage
3	(Ghana) Asante Kotoko	6	2	1	3	7	10	−3	7	
4	(Algeria) JS Kabylie	6	1	1	4	4	9	−5	4	

Home	Score	Away
JS Kabylie (Algeria)	1–0	(Ghana) Asante Kotoko
CS Sfaxien (Tunisia)	1–0	(Egypt) Al Ahly
Al Ahly (Egypt)	2–0	(Algeria) JS Kabylie
Asante Kotoko (Ghana)	4–2	(Tunisia) CS Sfaxien
JS Kabylie (Algeria)	0–1	(Tunisia) CS Sfaxien
Asante Kotoko (Ghana)	0–0	(Egypt) Al Ahly
Al Ahly (Egypt)	4–0	(Ghana) Asante Kotoko
CS Sfaxien (Tunisia)	2–0	(Algeria) JS Kabylie
Al Ahly (Egypt)	2–1	(Tunisia) CS Sfaxien
Asante Kotoko (Ghana)	2–1	(Algeria) JS Kabylie
JS Kabylie (Algeria)	2–2	(Egypt) Al Ahly
CS Sfaxien (Tunisia)	2–1	(Ghana) Asante Kotoko

=== Group B ===
Pos	Team	Pld	W	D	L	GF	GA	GD	Pts	Qualification
1	(Ivory Coast) ASEC Mimosas	6	3	3	0	11	1	+10	12	Advance to knockout stage
2	(South Africa) Orlando Pirates	6	2	3	1	4	6	−2	9	Advance to knockout stage
3	(Nigeria) Enyimba	6	2	2	2	4	5	−1	8	
4	(Ghana) Hearts of Oak	6	0	2	4	0	7	−7	2	

Home	Score	Away
Hearts of Oak (Ghana)	0–2	(Nigeria) Enyimba
Orlando Pirates (South Africa)	1–1	(Ivory Coast) ASEC Mimosas
ASEC Mimosas (Ivory Coast)	3–0	(Ghana) Hearts of Oak
Enyimba (Nigeria)	1–1	(South Africa) Orlando Pirates
ASEC Mimosas (Ivory Coast)	3–0	(Nigeria) Enyimba
Orlando Pirates (South Africa)	0–0	(Ghana) Hearts of Oak
Enyimba (Nigeria)	0–0	(Ivory Coast) ASEC Mimosas
Hearts of Oak (Ghana)	0–1	(South Africa) Orlando Pirates
ASEC Mimosas (Ivory Coast)	4–0	(South Africa) Orlando Pirates
Enyimba (Nigeria)	1–0	(Ghana) Hearts of Oak
Hearts of Oak (Ghana)	0–0	(Ivory Coast) ASEC Mimosas
Orlando Pirates (South Africa)	1–0	(Nigeria) Enyimba
