= Mohamed Barakat =

Egyptian footballer (born 1976)

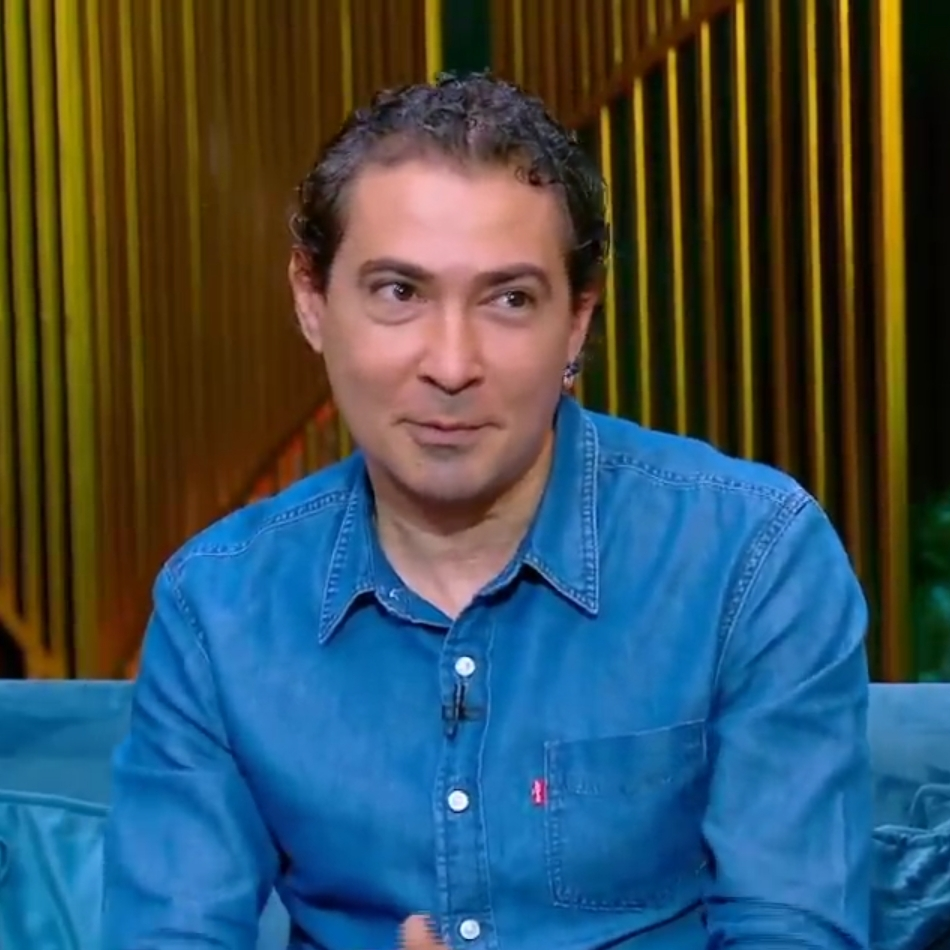
- Barakat in Al Ahly TV in 2020

Personal information
- Full name: Mohamed Barakat Ahmed Bastamy
- Date of birth: 7 September 1976 (age 50)
- Place of birth: Cairo, Egypt
- Height: 1.72 m (5 ft 8 in)
- Position: Midfielder

Youth career
- El Sekka El Hadid

Senior career*
Years	Team	Apps	(Gls)
1995–1998	El Sekka El Hadid	21	(6)
1998–2002	Ismaily	79	(14)
2002–2003	Al-Ahli	21	(10)
2003–2004	Al-Arabi	9	(0)
2004–2013	Al Ahly	149	(41)
Total		279	(71)

International career
2000–2010	Egypt	70	(9)
Medal record
Men's football
Representing Egypt
Africa Cup of Nations
Winner	2006 Egypt
- * Club domestic league appearances and goals

Mohamed Barakat Ahmed Bastamy (born 7 September 1976) is an Egyptian former professional footballer. A right-footed playmaker, he usually played as an right winger or attacking midfielder for Egyptian club Al Ahly and the Egypt national team.

Barakat was considered by many as one of the most talented players in Africa. His hallmarks are surging runs from midfield which often disrupt opposing defences, as well as his box-to-box work ethic, which makes him an important figure both in defence and attack. Thanks to his noticeable achievements and talent, his fans gave him the nickname The Mercurial (Arabic: بركات الزئبقي), He reached his peak in 2005 and 2006, helping his club Al Ahly to win the CAF Champions League 2005 and CAF Champions League 2006 and Egypt win their fifth African Cup of Nations Egypt 2006. However, in 2006 his career was marred by a long spell of injuries.

== Club career ==
=== Early career ===
Barakat began his career at Sekka but found his feet when he joined Al-Ismaily – just about the only club in Egypt with the ability to stand up to the 'big boys' of Al Ahly and Zamalek.

=== Gulf Countries ===
The 2002 Egyptian Footballer of the Year has joined Ahly Jeddah in Saudi Arabia. He helped the later win 2003 Arab Club Championship. Barakat scored twice in that tournament; including the Final winner goal. and then going to Alarabi in Qatar.

=== Al Ahly ===
Barakat returned to Egypt in 2004 to join Al Ahly. Some have commented that the combination with Mohamed Aboutrika and Emad Moteab formed the most formidable triangle in African Soccer, and they were given the moniker of "The Bermuda Triangle".

Mohamed Barakat won the BBC African Footballer of 2005 award ahead of Cameroon's Samuel Eto'o and Obafemi Martins of Nigeria. More than 15,000 voted for him. He was also named the best player in Africa's continental club competition by the African Football Association for the same year, as he scored 7 goals in the CAF Champions League 2005. Barakat started the season of 2013 with some bad performances, but after sometime he got back to his perfect form and scored in the CAF Super Cup 2013 the winning goal, which led Al Ahly to win the cup. After he played a match against Benzarty match in CAF Champions League 2013 and scored a goal from a penalty, he also made an assist to Emad Meteb. Two weeks later there were rumors of his retirement and Barakat admitted he was thinking of retiring because he is 37 years old. After with two days Barakat scored two goals against Enpii in the Egyptian league from a penalty and a shot. People all thought and said Barakat still has one or two seasons ahead after that amazing performance and goals and that he looked like he was eighteen while playing even though he is 37, but unfortunately three weeks after, Barakat announced that he was going to retire at the end of this season, putting an end to the career.

=== Retirement ===
After the Port Said Stadium clashes, on 1 February 2012, Barakat decided to retire from professional football, along with Emad Motaeb and Mohamed Aboutrika. However, he reversed his decision and returned to Al Ahly once again.

== International career ==
Barakat made his debut for the Pharaohs in June 2000 against South Korea. He played 4 matches in 2002 African Cup of Nations and all Egypt's matches in 2006 Africa Cup of Nations. Barakat ended his international career on 18 November 2009 after his dream to reach the 2010 FIFA World Cup was crashed by Algeria that won 1–0, he told the press about that discussion on 11 August 2010.

== Career statistics ==
=== International ===
Appearances and goals by national team and year
National team	Year	Apps	Goals
Egypt	2000	5	0
Egypt	2001	19	4
Egypt	2002	13	3
Egypt	2003	3	0
Egypt	2004	5	1
Egypt	2005	8	0
Egypt	2006	9	0
Egypt	2007	1	0
Egypt	2009	6	1
Total		69	9

Scores and results list Egypt's goal tally first, score column indicates score after each Barakat goal.

List of international goals scored by Mohamed Barakat
No.	Date	Venue	Opponent	Score	Result	Competition
1	11 March 2001	Cairo International Stadium, Cairo, Egypt	Algeria	1–0	5–2	2002 FIFA World Cup qualification
2	24 April 2001	Cairo International Stadium, Cairo, Egypt	Canada	3–0	3–0	2001 LG Cup
3	13 July 2001	Alexandria Stadium, Alexandria, Egypt	Namibia	2–0	8–2	2002 FIFA World Cup qualification
4	13 July 2001	Alexandria Stadium, Alexandria, Egypt	Namibia	6–2	8–2	2002 FIFA World Cup qualification
5	8 August 2002	Alexandria Stadium, Alexandria, Egypt	Ethiopia	1–0	4–1	Friendly
6	23 August 2002	Alexandria Stadium, Alexandria, Egypt	Sudan	2–0	3–0	Friendly
7	23 August 2002	Alexandria Stadium, Alexandria, Egypt	Sudan	3–0	3–0	Friendly
8	25 January 2004	Stade Taïeb Mhiri, Sfax, Tunisia	Zimbabwe	2–1	2–1	2004 African Cup of Nations
9	5 November 2009	Aswan Stadium, Aswan, Egypt	Tanzania	4–0	5–1	Friendly

== Honours ==
Ismaily

- Egyptian Premier League: 2001–02
- Egypt Cup: 2000

Al Ahli Saudi

- Arab Unified Club Championship: 2002

Al Ahly

- Egyptian Premier League: 2004–05, 2005–06, 2006–07, 2007–08, 2008–09, 2009–10, 2010–11
- Egypt Cup: 2006, 2007
- Egyptian Super Cup: 2005, 2006, 2007, 2008, 2010, 2012
- CAF Champions League: 2005, 2006, 2008, 2012
- CAF Super Cup: 2006, 2007, 2009, 2013

Egypt

- African Cup of Nations: 2006

Individual

- BBC African Footballer of the Year: 2005
- African Inter-Club Player of the Year: 2005
- CAF Team of the Year: 2005
- CAF Champions League top goalscorer: 2005 (Shared with Joetex Frimpong)
