= Jassem Khalloufi =

Tunisian footballer

Personal information
- Full name: Jassem Khalloufi
- Date of birth: September 2, 1981 (age 45)
- Place of birth: Le Kram, Tunisia
- Height: 1.87 m (6 ft 2 in)
- Position: Goalkeeper

Team information
- Current team: Stade Tunisien

Senior career*
| Years | Team | Apps | (Gls) |
- EOG Kram
| 2001–2005 | AS Marsa | | |
| 2005–2007 | Étoile du Sahel | | |
| 2007–2012 | CS Sfaxien | | |
| 2012– | Stade Tunisien | | |
- * Club domestic league appearances and goals as of 17 December 2008

Jassem Khalloufi (born 2 September 1981) is a Tunisian footballer. He currently plays for Stade Tunisien.

Khalloufi was part of the Tunisian 2004 Olympic football team who exited in the first round, finishing third in Group C, behind group and gold medal winners Argentina and runners-up Australia.
