= 1988 Afro-Asian Club Championship =

Yomiuri	Al-Ahly
(Japan)	(Egypt)
1	4

First leg
Yomiuri	Al-Ahly
1	3
- Date: 2 September 1989
- Venue: Nishigaoka Stadium, Tokyo

Second leg
Al-Ahly	Yomiuri
1	0
- Date: 22 September 1989
- Venue: Cairo Stadium, Cairo

The 1988 Afro-Asian Club Championship, was the 3rd Afro-Asian Club Championship competition endorsed by the Confederation of African Football (CAF) and Asian Football Confederation (AFC), contested between the winners of the African Champions' Cup and the Asian Club Championship.

The final was contested in two-legged home-and-away format between Japanese team Yomiuri the 1987 Asian Club Championship winner, and Egyptian team Al-Ahly, the 1987 African Cup of Champions Clubs winner.

The first leg was hosted by Yomiuri at the Nishigaoka Soccer Stadium in Tokyo on 2 September 1989, while the second leg was hosted by Al-Ahly at Cairo Stadium in Cairo on 22 September 1989.

Al-Ahly won the two legs, with a score on aggregate 4–1.

== Teams ==
Team	Qualification	Previous participation (bold indicates winners)
(Japan) Yomiuri	1987 Asian Club Championship winner	None
(Egypt) Al-Ahly	1987 African Cup of Champions Clubs winner	None

== Match details ==
=== First leg ===
2 September 1989
--:-- UTC+9

Yomiuri (Japan)	1–3	(Egypt) Al Ahly
Takeda 3'		Hassan 18', 77'; Saad 62'

Nishigaoka Soccer Stadium, Tokyo

=== Second leg ===
22 September 1989
--:-- UTC+2

Al Ahly (Egypt)	1–0	(Japan) Yomiuri
Abouzeid 40'

Cairo International Stadium, Cairo
