= Ahmed Adel (footballer, born 1984) =

Egyptian footballer (born 1984)

Ahmad Adel
Personal information
- Full name: Ahmad Adel
- Date of birth: January 7, 1984 (age 42)
- Place of birth: Alexandria, Egypt
- Height: 1.77 m (5 ft 10 in)
- Positions: Right full-back; wingback

Team information
- Current team: El Sharkia
- Number: 2

Youth career
- Al-Olympi

Senior career*
Years	Team	Apps	(Gls)
2004–2006	Al-Olympi		
2007–2008	Al Ahly	19	(0)
2008–2012	Ittihad	50	(0)
2010–2012	El Gouna	41	(1)
2012–2013	Smouha	4	(0)
2014	Wadi Degla	9	(0)
2014–2016	Ittihad El Shorta	54	(0)
2016–	El Sharkia	0	(0)
- * Club domestic league appearances and goals as of 14 October 2016 ‡ National team caps and goals as of 14 October 2016

Ahmad Adel (Arabic: أحمد عادل; born January 7, 1984) is an Egyptian footballer. He plays the right back position for El-Ittihad El-Iskandary (El Ittihad).

He is a young defender who transferred to Al Ahly in January 2007. He is known for fast performance. Adel was playing for Al Ahly until the age of 16, when his family moved in Alexandria. As a result, he left Al Ahly for Al-Olympi and started playing for the first-team of Al-Olympi at the age of 17, before moving to Al Ahly in January 2007. He was proved highly proficient and returned again to his home in summer 2008 for El Ittihad.

== Honours ==
With Al Ahly:

- Winner of African Super Cup 2007
- Winner of Egyptian League (2006–2007)
- Winner of Egyptian Soccer Cup 2007
- CAF Champions League Finalist 2007
