= Haitham El-Fazani =

Egyptian footballer (born 1985)

Personal information
- Full name: Haitham Hassan El-Fazani
- Date of birth: March 14, 1985 (age 41)
- Place of birth: Cairo, Egypt
- Height: 1.77 m (5 ft 9 1/2 in)
- Position: Midfielder

Team information
- Current team: El-Ittihad

Youth career
- Al Ahly

Senior career*
Years	Team	Apps	(Gls)
2005–2007	Al Ahly		
2007–2008	Itesalat		
2008–2009	El-Ittihad		
- * Club domestic league appearances and goals as of 22 October 2008 ‡ National team caps and goals as of 22 October 2008

Haitham El-Fazani (born March 14, 1985) is an Egyptian footballer. He plays as a midfielder for El-Ittihad El-Iskandary of Egypt.

El-Fazani previously played for Al Ahly in the Egyptian Premier League.
