= Pamphil Rabefitia =

Malagasy footballer

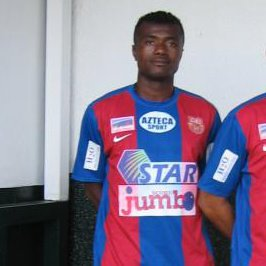

Personal information
- Full name: Pamphil Rabefitia
- Date of birth: March 27, 1986 (age 40)
- Place of birth: Antananarivo, Madagascar
- Height: 1.87 m (6 ft 1 1/2 in)
- Position: Forward

Senior career*
Years	Team	Apps	(Gls)
2004–2005	USJF Ravinala		
2005–2006	Faucon Flacq SC		
2006–2008	US Stade Tamponnaise	39	(12)
2008–2009	AS Adema		
2009–2010	AS Marsouins	41	(23)
2011–2012	US Sainte-Marienne	43	(9)
2013–2014	AS Possession	26	(11)
2014–2017	SS Jeanne d'Arc		

International career
2006–2009	Madagascar	2	(0)
- * Club domestic league appearances and goals

Pamphil Rabefitia (born 27 March 1986 in Antananarivo) is a football player who last played for SS Jeanne d'Arc in the Réunion Premier League and use to play for the Madagascar national football team as a forward. Rabefitia made his debut against Botswana at the 2006 COSAFA Cup where he hit the cross bar,
