= Khaled Melliti =

Tunisian footballer

Personal information
- Full name: Khaled Melliti
- Date of birth: 22 May 1984 (age 42)
- Place of birth: Tunis, Tunisia
- Height: 1.80 m (5 ft 11 in)
- Position: Attacking midfielder

Team information
- Current team: SC Ben Arous

Youth career
- SC Ben Arous
- Étoile du Sahel

Senior career*
Years	Team	Apps	(Gls)
2003–2008	Étoile du Sahel	152	(41)
2008–2011	Club Africain	83	(24)
2011–2013	FC Istres	33	(1)
2013–2014	Bizertin	21	(1)
2015–2016	Hammam-Lif	16	(2)
2016–2017	AS Gabès	28	(2)
2017–2019	Stade Gabèsien	33	(2)
2020–	SC Ben Arous		
- * Club domestic league appearances and goals as of 21:49, 20 August 2020 (UTC)

Khaled Melliti (born 22 May 1984) is a Tunisian football player, who plays as a midfielder for SC Ben Arous.

== Career ==
=== Club career ===
Melliti participated in the 2007 FIFA Club World Cup with Étoile du Sahel and played 58 minutes in the Bronze Ball match against Urawa Red Diamonds. In the summer 2008, he signed with Club Africainfor 3 years, after an exchange agreement with Étoile du Sahel, who signed Ahmed Akeichi.

On 4 July 2011, Melliti joined French Ligue 2 club Istres on free transfer. Melliti then returned to Tunisia at the end of 2013, and played for CA Bizertin, CS Hammam-Lif, AS Gabès and Stade Gabèsien, before returning to his childhood club SC Ben Arous in January 2020.

== Honours ==
Étoile

- Tunisian League : 2007
- Leagues's Cup : 2005
- CAF Champions League : 2007
- CAF Confederation Cup : 2006
- CAF Super Cup : 2007
- Participation in FIFA Club World Cup : 2007
