= Blaise Koissy =

Ivorian footballer (born 1980)

Personal information
- Date of birth: January 12, 1980 (age 46)
- Place of birth: Adjamé, Ivory Coast
- Height: 1.92 m (6 ft 4 in)
- Position: Striker

Team information
- Current team: CS Sfaxien
- Number: 9

Senior career*
Years	Team	Apps	(Gls)
2000–	Athlétic d'Adjamé		
–	Stella d'Adjamé		
–2005	Africa Sports		
2005–2009	CS Sfaxien		
2009	Al Shabab		
2014	Horoya		
- * Club domestic league appearances and goals as of August 3, 2007

Blaise Koissy (born 12 January 1980) is an Ivorian striker who played for CS Sfaxien.

== Career ==
Born Adjamé, Koissy began his football career with local side AS Athlétic d'Adjamé in 2000. He joined local rivals Stella Club d'Adjamé before starring at Africa Sports d'Abidjan where he would lead the league in scoring. As a result, CS Sfaxien manager Michel Decastel signed Koissy on a 3.5-year contract. Koissy enjoyed a successful six-year spell with CS Sfaxien.

Koissy was reported to be a target of Algerian club ES Setif in June 2007.
