= 2006 CAF Super Cup =

Al Ahly	FAR Rabat
(Egypt)	(Morocco)
0	0
- Al Ahly won 4–2 on penalties
- Date: 24 February 2006
- Venue: Cairo Stadium, Cairo
- Referee: Koman Coulibaly (Mali)

The 2006 CAF Super Cup was the 14th CAF Super Cup, an annual football match in Africa organized by the Confederation of African Football (CAF), between the winners of the previous season's two CAF club competitions, the African Cup of Champions Clubs and the CAF Confederation Cup.

The match took place on 24 February 2006, on Cairo Stadium in Cairo, Egypt, between Al Ahly, the 2005 CAF Champions League winner, and FAR Rabat, the 2005 CAF Confederation Cup winner. Al-Ahly won the match by penalty shout-out 4–2 to get his second title.

== Teams ==
Team	Qualification	Previous participation (bold indicates winners)
(Egypt) Al Ahly	2005 CAF Champions League winner	1994, **2002**
(Morocco) FAR Rabat	2005 CAF Confederation Cup winner	None

== Match details ==
24 February 2006
18:00 UTC+2

Al Ahly (Egypt)	0–0	(Morocco) FAR Rabat
	Report
Penalties
El-Nahhas (penalty scored); Osama (penalty scored); Shady (penalty scored); El-Shater (penalty scored)	4 – 2	(penalty missed) Boubou; (penalty scored) El Maaroufi; (penalty scored) Lotfi; (penalty missed) El Fadly

Cairo Stadium
Referee: Koman Coulibaly (Mali)

**Al-Ahly**	**FAR Rabat**

GK	1	(Egypt) Essam El-Hadary
RB	2	(Egypt) Islam El-Shater	(yellow card) ?'
CB	4	(Egypt) Emad El-Nahhas
CB	5	(Egypt) Ahmad El-Sayed
CB	7	(Egypt) Shady Mohamed
LB	3	(Egypt) Mohamed Abdelwahab		(substituted off) 83'
CM	25	(Egypt) Hossam Ashour
CM	14	(Egypt) Hassan Mostafa
AM	22	(Egypt) Mohamed Aboutrika
CF	9	(Egypt) Emad Moteab
CF	23	(Angola) Flavio Amado	(yellow card) ?'		(substituted off) 94'
Substitutes:
MF		(Egypt) Haitham El-Fazani		(substituted on) 83'
MF	10	(Egypt) Wael Riad		(substituted on) 94'		(substituted off) 105'
FW	18	(Egypt) Osama Hosny		(substituted on) 105'
Manager:
(Portugal) Manuel José de Jesus

GK	(Morocco) Tarik El Jarmouni
CB	(Morocco) Noureddine Boubou		(substituted off) 95'
CB	(Morocco) El Houssaine Ouchla
CB	(Morocco) Mohamed El Fadly
RM	(Morocco) Hafid Abdessadek	(yellow card) ?'
CM	(Morocco) Ahmed Ajeddou	(yellow card) ?'
CM	(Morocco) Khalidi El Maaroufi	(yellow card) ?'
LM	(Morocco) Yassine Naoum		(substituted off) 112'
CF	(Morocco) Youssef Kaddioui
CF	(Morocco) Hakim Ajraoui		(substituted off) 57'
CF	(Morocco) Jaouad Akaddar
Substitutes:
FW	(Morocco) Adil Lotfi		(substituted on) 57'
DF	(Morocco) Adil Serraj		(substituted on) 95'
MF	(Morocco) Issam Erraki		(substituted on) 112'
Manager:
(Morocco) Mohamed Fakhir
