= 2005 CAF Champions League =

Confederation of African Football Champions League

Tournament details
- Dates: 29 January – 12 November
- Teams: 52 (from 47 confederations)

Final positions
- Champions: (Egypt) Al Ahly (4th title)
- Runners-up: (Tunisia) Étoile du Sahel

Tournament statistics
- Matches played: 104
- Goals scored: 266 (2.56 per match)
- Top scorer(s): (Egypt) Mohamed Barakat (Ghana) Joetex Frimpong (7 goals each)

The 2005 CAF Champions League was the 41st edition of the CAF Champions League, the Africa's premier club football tournament prize organized by the Confederation of African Football (CAF). It was started on 29 January 2005 with a preliminary round. Al Ahly of Egypt defeated Étoile du Sahel of Tunisia in the final to win their fourth title.

== Qualifying rounds ==
=== Preliminary round ===
Team 1	Agg.	Team 2	1st leg	2nd leg
Asante Kotoko (Ghana)	w/o	(The Gambia) Wallidan FC	^{1}	
FAR Rabat (Morocco)	4–1	(Mauritania) ASC Ksar	4–0	0–1
Djoliba AC (Mali)	1–2	(Senegal) AS Douanes	1–1	0–1
RC Bafoussam (Cameroon)	3–0	(Benin) Donjo	1–0	2–0
DC Motema Pembe (Democratic Republic of the Congo)	3–2	(Rwanda) Rayon Sport	3–0	0–2
Dolphin FC (Nigeria)	3–1	(Equatorial Guinea) Renacimiento FC	3–0	0–1
Sagrada Esperança (Angola)	2–1	(Gabon) AS Mangasport	0–0	2–1
ASA (Angola)	4–2	(Namibia) Blue Waters F.C.	3–0	1–2
Tusker FC (Kenya)	7–1	(Zanzibar) KMKM	4–1	3–0
TP Mazembe (Democratic Republic of the Congo)	2–2 (4–5 pk)	(Burkina Faso) ASFA Yennenga	2–0	0–2
Ajax Cape Town (South Africa)	2–1	(Eswatini) Mhlambanyatsi Rovers	1–0	1–1
Diaraf Dakar (Senegal)	2–2	(Guinea) Fello Star	2–1	0–1
Al-Hilal Omdurman (Sudan)	3–2	(Ethiopia) Awassa City FC	2–1	1–1
La Passe (Seychelles)	3–6	(Madagascar) USJF Ravinala	2–2	1–4
Kaizer Chiefs (South Africa)	3–2	(Mauritius) AS Port Louis 2000	2–0	1–2
Simba SC (Tanzania)	3–2	(Mozambique) Ferroviário Nampula	2–1	1–1
CAPS United (Zimbabwe)	8–4	Lesotho Defence Force FC	4–1	4–3
Red Arrows (Zambia)	0–0 (3–2 pk)	(Republic of the Congo) CSMD Diables Noirs	0–0	0–0
Al Olympic (Libya)	4–3	(Chad) Renaissance FC	2–0	2–3
Villa SC (Uganda)	3–0	(Eritrea) Adulis Club	1–0	2–0

^{1} Wallidan FC were withdrawn by the Gambia Football Federation.

=== First round ===
|Ajax Cape Town won 5–3 on penalties

Team 1	Agg.	Team 2	1st leg	2nd leg
Asante Kotoko (Ghana)	1–2	(Morocco) FAR Rabat	1–0	0–2
AS Douanes (Senegal)	1–3	(Tunisia) Étoile du Sahel	0–0	1–3
RC Bafoussam (Cameroon)	2–3	(Ivory Coast) Africa Sports National	1–0	1–3
DC Motema Pembe (Democratic Republic of the Congo)	1–3	(Morocco) Raja Casablanca	1–1	0–2
Dolphin FC (Nigeria)	5–2	(Ghana) Hearts of Oak SC	4–0	1–2
Sagrada Esperança (Angola)	2–3	(Ivory Coast) ASEC Mimosas	2–2	0–1
ASA (Angola)	2–1	(Cameroon) Coton Sport FC	2–0	0–1
Tusker FC (Kenya)	1–4	(Egypt) Zamalek	0–1	1–3
ASFA Yennenga (Burkina Faso)	1–1	(South Africa) Ajax Cape Town	1–0	0–1
Fello Star (Guinea)	1–0	(Algeria) JS Kabylie	1–0	0–0
Al-Hilal (Sudan)	3–5	(Tunisia) Espérance de Tunis	2–0	1–5
USJF Ravinala (Madagascar)	1–5	(South Africa) Kaizer Chiefs	0–1	1–4
Simba SC (Tanzania)	1–5	(Nigeria) Enyimba	1–1	0–4
CAPS United (Zimbabwe)	2–3	(Zambia) Red Arrows	1–1	1–2
Al Olympic (Libya)	0–7	(Algeria) USM Alger	0–2	0–5
Al Ahly (Egypt)	6–0	(Uganda) Villa SC	0–0	6–0

=== Second round ===
|ASEC Mimosas won 5–3 on penalties |Ajax Cape Town won 3–2 on penalties

Team 1	Agg.	Team 2	1st leg	2nd leg
FAR Rabat (Morocco)	1–2	(Tunisia) Étoile Sahel	1–0	0–2
Africa Sports National (Ivory Coast)	1–2	(Morocco) Raja Casablanca	1–1	0–1
Dolphin FC (Nigeria)	2–2	(Ivory Coast) ASEC Mimosas	2–0	0–2
ASA (Angola)	1–3	(Egypt) Zamalek	1–1	0–2
Ajax Cape Town (South Africa)	2–2	(Guinea) Fello Star	2–0	0–2
Espérance de Tunis (Tunisia)	5–2	(South Africa) Kaizer Chiefs	4–0	1–2
Enyimba (Nigeria)	9–1	(Zambia) Red Arrows	3–0	6–1
USM Alger (Algeria)	2–3	(Egypt) Al Ahly	0–1	2–2

== Group stage ==
Key to colours in group tables
Group winners and runners-up advance to the Knockout stage

=== Group A ===
Pos	Team	Pld	W	D	L	GF	GA	GD	Pts	Qualification	AHL	RCA	ENY	AJA
1	(Egypt) Al Ahly	6	4	2	0	7	2	+5	14	Advance to knockout stage	—			
2	(Morocco) Raja Casablanca	6	2	2	2	6	5	+1	8	Advance to knockout stage		—		
3	(Nigeria) Enyimba	6	2	1	3	6	5	+1	7				—	
4	(South Africa) Ajax Cape Town	6	0	3	3	2	9	−7	3					—

=== Group B ===
Pos	Team	Pld	W	D	L	GF	GA	GD	Pts	Qualification	ESS	ZAM	ASEC	ESP
1	(Tunisia) Étoile du Sahel	6	2	4	0	8	6	+2	10	Advance to knockout stage	—			
2	(Egypt) Zamalek	6	2	3	1	8	7	+1	9	Advance to knockout stage		—		
3	(Ivory Coast) ASEC Mimosas	6	1	3	2	5	6	−1	6				—	
4	(Tunisia) Espérance de Tunis	6	0	4	2	3	5	−2	4					—

== Knockout stage ==
=== Bracket ===
Semi-finals
(Morocco)	Raja Casablanca	0	0	0
(Tunisia)	Étoile du Sahel	1	1	2
(Egypt)	Zamalek	1	0	1
(Egypt)	Al Ahly	2	2	4

Final
(Tunisia)	Étoile du Sahel	0	0	0
(Egypt)	Al Ahly	0	3	3

=== Semi-finals ===
The first leg was played on 24–25 September and the second on 15–16 October.

Team 1	Agg.	Team 2	1st leg	2nd leg
Raja Casablanca (Morocco)	0–2	(Tunisia) Étoile du Sahel	0–1	0–1
Zamalek (Egypt)	1–4	(Egypt) Al Ahly	1–2	0–2

=== Final ===
29 October 2005
18:00 GMT

Etoile du Sahel (Tunisia)	0–0	(Egypt) Al Ahly

Stade Olympique de Sousse, Sousse
Attendance: 20,000
Referee: Abderrahim El Arjoun (Morocco)
12 November 2005
17:30 GMT

Al Ahly (Egypt)	3–0	(Tunisia) Etoile du Sahel
Aboutrika 20'; Hosny 51'; Barakat 90+2'

Cairo Military Academy Stadium, Cairo
Attendance: 35,000
Referee: Lassina Paré (Burkina Faso)

== Top goalscorers ==
The top scorers from the 2005 CAF Champions League are as follows:

Rank	Name	Team	Goals
1	(Egypt) Mohamed Barakat	(Egypt) Al Ahly	7
1	(Ghana) Joetex Frimpong	(Nigeria) Enyimba	7
3	(Egypt) Emad Moteab	(Egypt) Al Ahly	6
4	(Zimbabwe) Leonard Tsipa	(Zimbabwe) CAPS United	5
5	(Madagascar) Pamphil Rabefitia	(Madagascar) USJF Ravinala	4
5	(Zambia) Collins Mbesuma	(South Africa) Kaizer Chiefs	4

== See also ==
- 2005 FIFA Club World Championship
