= 2006 CAF Champions League =

Confederation of African Football Champions League

Tournament details
- Dates: 17 February – 11 November
- Teams: 61 (from 49 confederations)

Final positions
- Champions: (Egypt) Al Ahly (5th title)
- Runners-up: (Tunisia) CS Sfaxien

Tournament statistics
- Matches played: 117
- Goals scored: 297 (2.54 per match)
- Top scorer: (Egypt) Mohamed Aboutrika (8 goals)

The 2006 CAF Champions League was the 42nd edition of the CAF Champions League, the Africa's premier club football tournament prize organized by the Confederation of African Football (CAF). It was started on 17 February 2006 with a preliminary round. Al Ahly of Egypt defeated CS Sfaxien of Tunisia in the final to win their fifth title and for the second time in a row with a late winner by Mohamed Aboutrika. AlAhly keep the trophy forever after 3 cups

== Qualifying rounds ==
=== Preliminary round ===
Team 1	Agg.	Team 2	1st leg	2nd leg
Renacimiento FC (Equatorial Guinea)	2–2 (a)	(Ivory Coast) Africa Sports National	0–0	2–2
Stade Malien (Mali)	5–2	(Guinea) Satellite FC	3–0	2–2
Tusker FC (Kenya)	4–1	(Eritrea) Red Sea FC	3–1	1–0
RC Kadiogo (Burkina Faso)	1–2	(Algeria) USM Alger	1–1	0–1
AS Douanes (Togo)	2–3	(Senegal) ASC Port Autonome	0–0	2–3
FC Civics (Namibia)	5–2	(Angola) Sagrada Esperança	4–0	1–2
East End Lions (Sierra Leone)	0–7	(Ivory Coast) ASEC Mimosas	0–4	0–3
Mbabane Swallows (Eswatini)	2–7	(South Africa) Orlando Pirates	0–5	2–2
AS Port-Louis 2000 (Mauritius)	1–0	(Comoros) Coin Nord	1–0	N/A^{1}
Police FC (Uganda)	0–3	(Sudan) Al-Hilal Omdurman	0–0	0–3
Police XI (Botswana)	2–3	(Nigeria) Enugu Rangers	2–2	0–1
Mangasport (Gabon)	1–2	(Nigeria) Enyimba	1–0	0–2
LPRC Oilers (Liberia)	2–3	(Senegal) ASC Diaraf	0–0	2–3
Renaissance FC (Chad)	1–2	(Cameroon) Coton Sport FC	1–1	0–1
FC Saint Eloi Lupopo (Democratic Republic of the Congo)	4–1	(Republic of the Congo) AS Police	2–0	2–1
Anges de Fatima (Central African Republic)	0–2	(Democratic Republic of the Congo) DC Motema Pembe	0–0	0–2
AS-FNIS (Niger)	1–7	(Tunisia) CS Sfaxien	1–3	0–4
APR FC (Rwanda)	4–2	(Angola) ASA	3–2	1–0
Aigle Royal de la Menoua (Cameroon)	1–4	(Ghana) Asante Kotoko	1–1	0–3
La Passe FC (Seychelles)	0–2	(Mozambique) Clube Ferroviário de Maputo	0–0	0–2
Likhopo (Lesotho)	0–4	(South Africa) Mamelodi Sundowns	0–1	0–3
AS Excelsior (Réunion)	3–3 (a)	(Madagascar) USCA Foot	3–1	0–2
Wallidan FC (The Gambia)	w/o^{2}	(Ghana) Hearts of Oak SC	N/A	N/A
ENPPI Club (Egypt)	0–1	(Ethiopia) Saint-George SA	0–0	0–1
Polisi (Zanzibar)	w/o^{3}	(Malawi) CIVO United	N/A	N/A
Al-Ittihad (Libya)	1–5	(Algeria) JS Kabylie	1–1	0–4
Young Africans (Tanzania)	2–3	(Zambia) Zanaco FC	2–1	0–2
AS Inter Star (Burundi)	3–3 (a)^{4}	(Zimbabwe) CAPS United	3–3	0–0
El Ahmedi (Mauritania)	w/o^{5}	(Morocco) Raja Casablanca	N/A	N/A

^{1} The tie between AS Port-Louis 2000 and Coin Nord was played over one leg only by mutual consent.
^{2} Wallidan FC withdrew.
^{3} CIVO United withdrew.
^{4} CAPS United were later ejected from the competition.
^{5} El Ahmedi withdrew.

=== First round ===
Team 1	Agg.	Team 2	1st leg	2nd leg
Stade Malien (Mali)	2–2 (a)	(Equatorial Guinea) Renacimiento FC	2–1	0–1
Tusker FC (Kenya)	0–5	(Egypt) Al Ahly	0–2	0–3
ASC Port Autonome (Senegal)	4–4 (a)	(Algeria) USM Alger	2–1	2–3
ASEC Mimosas (Ivory Coast)	4–0	(Namibia) FC Civics	3–0	1–0
AS Port-Louis 2000 (Mauritius)	0–9	(South Africa) Orlando Pirates	0–5	0–4
Enugu Rangers (Nigeria)	1–4	(Sudan) Al-Hilal	1–0	0–4
ASC Diaraf (Senegal)	0–2	(Nigeria) Enyimba	0–0	0–2
FC Saint Eloi Lupopo (Democratic Republic of the Congo)	1–0	(Cameroon) Coton Sport FC	1–0	0–0
CS Sfaxien (Tunisia)	2–1	(Democratic Republic of the Congo) DC Motema Pembe	1–1	1–0
APR FC (Rwanda)	2–2 (a)	(Morocco) FAR Rabat	2–1	0–1
Clube Ferroviário de Maputo (Mozambique)	1–2	(Ghana) Asante Kotoko	0–0	1–2
USCA Foot (Madagascar)	3–3 (a)	(South Africa) Mamelodi Sundowns	1–1	2–2
Saint-George SA (Ethiopia)	4–2	(Ghana) Hearts of Oak	4–0	0–2^{1}
Polisi (Zanzibar)	0–5	(Tunisia) Étoile Sahel	0–2	0–3
Zanaco FC (Zambia)	0–5	(Algeria) JS Kabylie	0–2	0–3
Raja Casablanca (Morocco)	null and void	(Zimbabwe) CAPS United	1–0	n/p ^{2}
Raja Casablanca (Morocco)	8–2	(Burundi) AS Inter Star	7–0	1–2

^{1} The match was abandoned at 9' of injury time in the first half with Hearts of Oak leading 2–0, after Saint-George SA walked off protesting the officiating. The tie was awarded to Hearts of Oak.
^{2} CAPS United were ejected from the competition after 1st leg, when it was discovered that false information had been submitted for two Malawian players in their first round match against AS Inter Star. AS Inter Star were also re-instated.

=== Second round ===
Team 1	Agg.	Team 2	1st leg	2nd leg
Renacimiento FC (Equatorial Guinea)	0–4	(Egypt) Al Ahly	0–0	0 – 4
ASC Port Autonome (Senegal)	1–6	(Ivory Coast) ASEC Mimosas	1–0	0 – 6
Orlando Pirates(a) (South Africa)	3–3	(Sudan) Al-Hilal Omdurman	2–0	1 – 3
Enyimba (Nigeria)	3–0	(Democratic Republic of the Congo) FC Saint Eloi Lupopo	2–0	1 – 0
CS Sfaxien (Tunisia)	2–1	(Morocco) FAR Rabat	1–1	1 – 0
Asante Kotoko (Ghana)	6–1	(Madagascar) USCA Foot	6–0	0 – 1
Hearts of Oak (Ghana)	1 – 1 (6–5 p)	(Tunisia) Étoile du Sahel	1–0	0 – 1
JS Kabylie (Algeria)	3–2	(Morocco) Raja Casablanca	3–1	0 – 1

== Group stage ==
Key to colours in group tables
Group winners and runners-up advance to the Knockout stage

=== Group A ===
Pos	Team	Pld	W	D	L	GF	GA	GD	Pts	Qualification	CSS	AHL	ASA	JSK
1	(Tunisia) CS Sfaxien	6	4	0	2	9	7	+2	12	Advance to knockout stage	—	1–0	2–1	2–0
2	(Egypt) Al Ahly	6	3	2	1	10	4	+6	11	Advance to knockout stage	2–1	—	4–0	2–0
3	(Ghana) Asante Kotoko	6	2	1	3	7	10	−3	7		4–2	0–0	—	2–1
4	(Algeria) JS Kabylie	6	1	1	4	4	9	−5	4		0–1	2–2	1–0	—

=== Group B ===
Pos	Team	Pld	W	D	L	GF	GA	GD	Pts	Qualification	ASEC	ORL	ENY	OAK
1	(Ivory Coast) ASEC Mimosas	6	3	3	0	11	1	+10	12	Advance to knockout stage	—	4–0	3–0	3–0
2	(South Africa) Orlando Pirates	6	2	3	1	4	6	−2	9	Advance to knockout stage	1–1	—	1–0	0–0
3	(Nigeria) Enyimba	6	2	2	2	4	5	−1	8		0–0	1–1	—	1–0
4	(Ghana) Hearts of Oak	6	0	2	4	0	7	−7	2		0–0	0–1	0–2	—

== Knockout stage ==
=== Bracket ===
Semi-finals
(Egypt)	Al Ahly	2	1	3
(Ivory Coast)	ASEC Mimosas	0	2	2
(South Africa)	Orlando Pirates	0	0	0
(Tunisia)	CS Sfaxien	0	1	1

Final
(Egypt)	Al Ahly	1	1	2
(Tunisia)	CS Sfaxien	1	0	1

=== Semi-finals ===
The first legs were played on 29 September–1 October and the second legs on 14–15 October.

Team 1	Agg.	Team 2	1st leg	2nd leg
Al Ahly (Egypt)	3–2	(Ivory Coast) ASEC Mimosas	2–0	1–2
Orlando Pirates (South Africa)	0–1	(Tunisia) CS Sfaxien	0–0	0–1

=== Final ===
29 October 2006
18:00 GMT

Al-Ahly (Egypt)	1–1	(Tunisia) CS Sfaxien
Mohamed Aboutrika 27'	[[[Category:All articles with unsourced statements]] Rapport]	Frimpong 53'

Cairo International Stadium, Cairo
Attendance: 74,000
Referee: Modou Sowe (Gambia)
11 November 2006
17:30 GMT

CS Sfaxien (Tunisia)	0–1	(Egypt) Al-Ahly
	[[[Category:All articles with unsourced statements]] Rapport]	Mohamed Aboutrika 90+2'

Stade 7 November, Tunis
Attendance: 60,000
Referee: Coffi Codjia (Benin)

== Top goalscorers ==
The top scorers from the 2006 CAF Champions League are as follows:

Rank	Name	Team	Goals
1	(Egypt) Mohamed Aboutrika	(Egypt) Al Ahly	8
2	(Egypt) Emad Moteab	(Egypt) Al Ahly	5
3	(Algeria) Hamza Yacef	(Algeria) JS Kabylie	4
4	(Angola) Flávio	(Egypt) Al Ahly	3
4	(Egypt) Osama Hosny	(Egypt) Al Ahly	3
4	(Ghana) Joetex Asamoah Frimpong	(Tunisia) CS Sfaxien	3
4	(Algeria) Hamid Berguiga	(Algeria) JS Kabylie	3
4	(Mali) Cheick Oumar Dabo	(Algeria) JS Kabylie	3
4	(Morocco) Mustapha Bidoudane	(Morocco) Raja CA	3

== See also ==
- 2006 FIFA Club World Cup
