= 2007 CAF Champions League final =

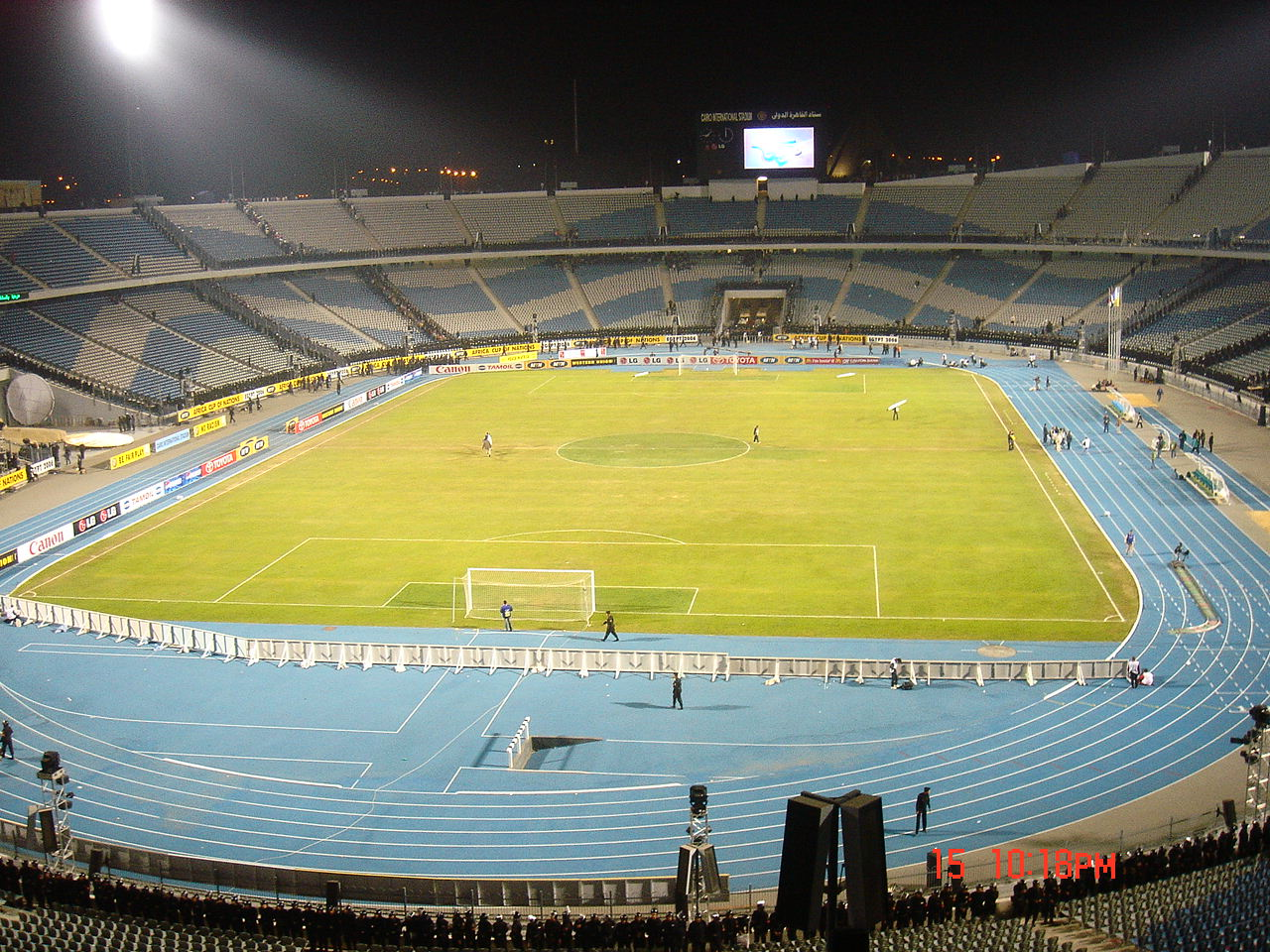
- Cairo International Stadium hosted the podium where Étoile du Sahel lifted the trophy
- Event: 2007 CAF Champions League
Étoile du Sahel	Al-Ahly
(Tunisia)	(Egypt)
3	1

First leg
Étoile du Sahel	Al-Ahly
0	0
- Date: 27 October 2007
- Venue: Stade Olympique de Sousse, Sousse
- Referee: Raphaël Evehe Divine (Cameroon)
- Attendance: 25,000

Second Leg
Al-Ahly	Étoile du Sahel
1	3
- Date: 9 November 2007
- Venue: Cairo International Stadium, Cairo
- Referee: Abderrahim El Arjoun (Morocco)
- Attendance: 74,000

The 2007 CAF Champions League final was the final of the 2007 CAF Champions League, the 43rd edition of Africa's premier club football tournament organized by the Confederation of African Football (CAF), and the 11th edition under the current CAF Champions League format.

The final was played between Étoile du Sahel from Tunisia and Al-Ahly from Egypt. After a goal-less first leg, EsS Sahel won the second leg 3–1 in Cairo to win their first African title . As a result, ES Sahel qualified to enter the quarterfinals of the 2007 FIFA Club World Cup as the CAF representative, as well as participate in the 2008 CAF Super Cup against the winner of the 2007 CAF Confederation Cup.

== Qualified teams ==
In the following table, finals until 1996 were in the African Cup of Champions Club era, since 1997 were in the CAF Champions League era.

Team	Region	Previous finals appearances (bold indicates winners)
(Tunisia) Étoile du Sahel	UNAF (North Africa)	2004, 2005
(Egypt) Al Ahly	UNAF (North Africa)	**1982**, 1983, **1987**, **2001**, **2005**, **2006**

== Background ==
Both teams had met in the same round in 2005 when the Egyptian team won (3-0) in Cairo. Al-Ahly were the defending champions, and also the most successful club in the African Champions Cup/CAF Champions League with Zamalek, reaching a total of six finals, winning five (1982, 1987, 2001, 2005, 2006) and losing one (1983). Étoile du Sahel reached the final twice but they lost against Enyimba in 2004 and against Al Ahly in 2005. Both teams qualified as winners of their groups.

Both teams qualified for the semifinals on the second-last matchday. In the semifinals Étoile du Sahel defeated the Sudanese side Al Hilal 3–2 on aggregate, losing the first leg in Omdurman (1-2), with the second leg ending in a win (3-1). Al Ahly faced Al Iittihad from Libya and draw the first leg (0-0) away from home. In need of a win in the second leg, Al Ahly were victorious 1–0 and reached the final to face Étoile du Sahel again after 2 years.

== Venues ==
=== Stade Olympique de Sousse ===
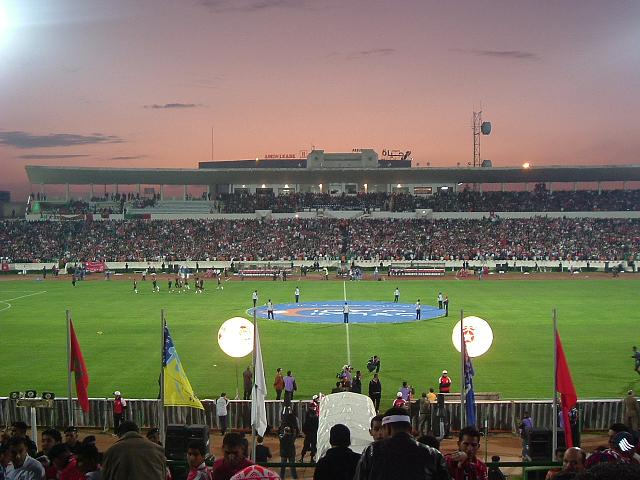
Stade Olympique in Sousse, Tunisia hosted the first leg.

Stade olympique de Sousse is a multi-purpose stadium in Sousse, Tunisia. It is used by the football team Étoile du Sahel, and was used for the 2004 African Cup of Nations. The stadium holds 28,000 people. It hosts within it the meetings played by the football team of the city: Étoile sportive du Sahel (ESS).

For many decades, Sousse footballers knew only the clay surfaces and knew the turf surfaces only when the stadium was inaugurated with an initial capacity of 10,000 places. It passes over the years to 15,000 seats and is then expanded again on the occasion of the 1994 African Cup of Nations with 6,000 additional seats to reach a capacity of 21,000 seats; A luminous panel is installed at the same time. The last expansion was carried out in 1999 to bring the capacity of the stadium to 28,000 seats for the 2001 Mediterranean Games, a reorganization of the gallery of honor was carried out, from a capacity of 70 to 217 places.

It hosted 1977 FIFA World Youth Championship, 1994 African Cup of Nations, 2001 Mediterranean Games and 2004 African Cup of Nations.

=== Cairo International Stadium ===
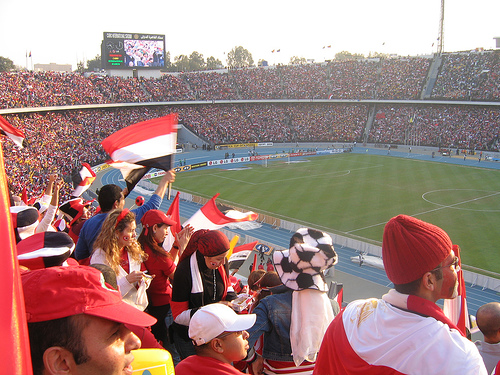
International Stadium in Cairo, Egypt hosted the second leg.

Cairo International Stadium, formerly known as Nasser Stadium, is an Olympic-standard, multi-use stadium with an all-seated capacity of 75,000. The architect of the stadium is the German Werner March, who had built from 1934 to 1936 the Olympic Stadium in Berlin. Before becoming an all seater stadium, it had the ability to hold over 100,000 spectators, reaching a record of 120,000. It is the foremost Olympic-standard facility befitting the role of Cairo, Egypt as the center of events in the region. It is also the 69th largest stadium in the world. Located in Nasr City; a suburb north east of Cairo, it was completed in 1960, and was inaugurated by President Gamal Abd El Nasser on 23 July that year, the eighth anniversary of the Egyptian Revolution of 1952. Zamalek SC currently use the Petro Sport Stadium for most of their home games and Al Ahly use Al Salam Stadium for most of their home games.

The Stadium is located about 10 km west of Cairo International Airport and about 10 km (30 min) from downtown Cairo.

In 2005, in preparation for the 2006 African Cup of Nations it underwent a major renovation, and was brought up to 21st century world standard along with all its multi-game Olympic facilities which did not enable the same two teams to play the 2005 final on this stadium.

== Road to final ==
(Tunisia) Étoile du Sahel				Round	(Egypt) Al-Ahly			
Opponent	Agg.	1st leg	2nd leg	Qualifying rounds	Opponent	Agg.	1st leg	2nd leg
(Guinea) Fello Star	5–1	1–0 (A)	4–1 (H)	First round	(Zimbabwe) Highlanders	2–0	0–0 (A)	2–0 (H)
(Togo) Maranatha	3–0	0–0 (A)	3–0 (H)	Second round	(South Africa) Mamelodi Sundowns	4–2	2–2 (A)	2–0 (H)
Opponent	Result			Group stage	Opponent	Result		
(Morocco) FAR Rabat	1–0 (A)			Matchday 1	(Sudan) Al-Hilal	2–0 (H)		
(Libya) Al-Ittihad	0–0 (H)			Matchday 2	(Ivory Coast) ASEC Mimosas	1–0 (A)		
(Algeria) JS Kabylie	3–0 (H)			Matchday 3	(Tunisia) Espérance de Tunis	3–0 (H)		
(Algeria) JS Kabylie	2–0 (A)			Matchday 4	(Tunisia) Espérance de Tunis	0–1 (A)		
(Morocco) FAR Rabat	0–0 (H)			Matchday 5	(Sudan) Al-Hilal	0–3 (A)		
(Libya) Al-Ittihad	0–2 (A)			Matchday 6	(Ivory Coast) ASEC Mimosas	2–0 (H)		
Group A Winner: Pos / Team / Pld / W / D / L / GF / GA / GD / Pts / Qualification; **1** / (Tunisia) Étoile du Sahel / **6** / **3** / **2** / **1** / **6** / **2** / **+4** / **11** / **Advance to knockout stage**; 2 / (Libya) Al-Ittihad / 6 / 3 / 1 / 2 / 6 / 4 / +2 / **10** / **Advance to knockout stage**; 3 / (Algeria) JS Kabylie / 6 / 2 / 1 / 3 / 6 / 8 / −2 / **7**; 4 / (Morocco) FAR Rabat / 6 / 1 / 2 / 3 / 2 / 6 / −4 / **5**; Source: CAF; Rules for classification: Group stage tiebreakers				Final standings	Group B Winner: Pos / Team / Pld / W / D / L / GF / GA / GD / Pts / Qualification; **1** / (Egypt) Al Ahly SC / **6** / **4** / **0** / **2** / **8** / **4** / **+4** / **12** / **Advance to knockout stage**; 2 / (Sudan) Al-Hilal / 6 / 3 / 1 / 2 / 8 / 5 / +3 / **10** / **Advance to knockout stage**; 3 / (Ivory Coast) ASEC Mimosas / 6 / 2 / 1 / 3 / 4 / 5 / −1 / **7**; 4 / (Tunisia) Espérance de Tunis / 6 / 1 / 2 / 3 / 2 / 8 / −6 / **5**; Source: CAF; Rules for classification: Group stage tiebreakers			
Opponent	Agg.	1st leg	2nd leg	Knock-out stage	Opponent	Agg.	1st leg	2nd leg
(Sudan) Al Hilal	4–3	1–2 (A)	3–1 (H)	Semifinals	(Libya) Al Ittihad	1–0	0–0 (A)	1–0 (H)

== Format ==
The final was decided over two legs, with aggregate goals used to determine the winner. If the sides were level on aggregate after the second leg, the away goals rule would have been applied, and if still level, the tie would have proceeded directly to a penalty shootout (no extra time is played).

== Matches ==
=== First leg ===
27 October 2007
18:00 GMT

Étoile du Sahel (Tunisia)	0–0	(Egypt) Al-Ahly

Stade Olympique, Sousse
Attendance: 25,000
Referee: Evehe Divine (Cameroon)

**ES Sahel**	**Al Ahly**

ES Sahel:
GK	1	(Tunisia) Aymen Mathlouthi
DF	13	(Tunisia) Saber Ben Frej	(yellow card) 30'
DF	4	(Tunisia) Radhouene Felhi
DF	6	(Tunisia) Saïf Ghezal	(yellow card) 72'
DF	10	(Tunisia) Mehdi Meriah	(red card) 79'
MF	19	(Tunisia) Mohamed Ali Nafkha
MF	24	(Ghana) Moussa Narry
MF	25	(Benin) Mouritala Ogunbiyi		(substituted off) 84'
MF	5	(Tunisia) Mejdi Traoui	Booked	(substituted off) 66'
MF	14	(Cape Verde) Gilson Silva
FW	21	(Tunisia) Amine Chermiti	(yellow card) 24'
Substitutes:
FW	16	(Ghana) Sadat Bukari		(substituted on) 66'
DF	4	(Tunisia) Hatem Bejaoui		(substituted on) 84'
Manager:
(France) Bertrand Marchand

Al Ahly:
GK	1	(Egypt) Essam El Hadary
DF	4	(Egypt) Emad El-Nahhas
DF	26	(Egypt) Wael Gomaa
DF	7	(Egypt) Shady Mohamed
DF	2	(Egypt) Islam El-Shater		(substituted off) 90'
DF	25	(Egypt) Hossam Ashour
MF	17	(Tunisia) Anis Boujelbene
MF	5	(Egypt) Ahmad El-Sayed	(yellow card) 12'
MF	8	(Egypt) Mohamed Barakat	(yellow card) 18'
MF	22	(Egypt) Mohamed Aboutrika		(substituted off) 87'
FW	23	(Angola) Flávio	(yellow card) 82'	(substituted off) 84'
Substitutes:
MF	9	(Egypt) Emad Meteb		(substituted on) 84'
FW	6	(Egypt) Ahmed Sedik		(substituted on) 87'
MF	18	(Egypt) Osama Hosny		(substituted on) 90'
Manager:
(Portugal) Manuel José

Assistant referees:
Efarist Mikwande (Cameroon)
Zogo Ndang (Cameroon)
Fourth official:
Fathi Amina (Tunisia)

=== Second leg ===
9 November 2007
17:30 GMT

Al Ahly (Egypt)	1–3	(Tunisia) Étoile du Sahel
El-Nahhas 48'		Gharbi 44'; Chermiti 90+3'; Narry 90+5'

Cairo International Stadium, Cairo
Attendance: 74,000
Referee: Abderrahim El Arjoun (Morocco)

**Al Ahly**	**ES Sahel**

Al Ahly:
GK	1	(Egypt) Essam El Hadary
DF	4	(Egypt) Emad El-Nahhas	(red card) 61'
DF	7	(Egypt) Shady Mohamed
MF	5	(Egypt) Ahmad El-Sayed
DF	2	(Egypt) Islam El-Shater		(substituted off) 46'
DF	12	(Angola) Gilberto		(substituted off) 75'
DF	25	(Egypt) Hossam Ashour
MF	17	(Tunisia) Anis Boujelbene		(substituted off) 66'
MF	22	(Egypt) Mohamed Aboutrika
MF	9	(Egypt) Emad Meteb
FW	23	(Angola) Flávio
Substitutes:
MF	9	(Egypt) Hassan Mostafa		(substituted on) 46'
FW	6	(Egypt) Mohamed Sedik		(substituted on) 66'
MF	18	(Egypt) Ahmed Qenawi		(substituted on) 75'
Manager:
(Portugal) Manuel José

ES Sahel:
GK	1	(Tunisia) Aymen Mathlouthi	Booked
DF	13	(Tunisia) Saber Ben Frej	Booked
DF	4	(Tunisia) Radhouene Felhi	Booked
DF	5	(Tunisia) Ammar Jemal
DF	6	(Tunisia) Hatem Bejaoui
MF	24	(Ghana) Moussa Narry
DF	19	(Tunisia) Mohamed Ali Nafkha
MF	25	(Benin) Mouritala Ogunbiyi		(substituted off) 84'
MF	10	(Tunisia) Afouène Gharbi		(substituted off) 66'
MF	7	(Cape Verde) Gilson Silva		(substituted off) 87'
FW	27	(Tunisia) Amine Chermiti
Substitutes:
FW	18	(Tunisia) Mejdi Traoui	Booked	(substituted on) 66'
MF	26	(Tunisia) Bassem Ben Nasser		(substituted on) 84'
MF	15	(Tunisia) Mahmoud Khemiri		(substituted on) 87'
Manager:
(France) Bertrand Marchand

Assistant referees:
Ayoub Mohamed (Morocco)
Radhouan Achik (Morocco)
Fourth official:
Walid Ibrahim (Egypt)
