= 2007 FIFA Club World Cup squads =

These were the squads for the 2007 FIFA Club World Cup, held in Japan from 7 December to 16 December 2007.

== Boca Juniors ==
Head coach: (Argentina) Miguel Ángel Russo

Note: Flags indicate national team as defined under FIFA eligibility rules; some limited exceptions apply. Players may hold more than one non-FIFA nationality.

No.	Pos.	Nation	Player
1	GK	ARG	Javier García
2	DF	ARG	Matías Silvestre
3	DF	PAR	Claudio Morel
4	DF	ARG	Hugo Ibarra
5	MF	ARG	Sebastián Battaglia
6	DF	ARG	Matías Cahais
8	MF	ARG	Pablo Ledesma
9	FW	ARG	Martín Palermo
11	MF	ARG	Leandro Gracián
12	GK	ARG	Mauricio Caranta
14	FW	ARG	Rodrigo Palacio
15	MF	URU	Álvaro González
16	DF	ARG	Juan Krupoviesa
17	FW	ARG	Mauro Boselli
18	MF	ARG	Neri Cardozo
20	DF	ARG	Jonathan Maidana
21	FW	URU	Carlos Bueno
22	MF	COL	Fabián Vargas
23	MF	ARG	Jesús Dátolo
24	MF	ARG	Éver Banega
25	GK	ARG	Pablo Migliore
27	MF	ARG	Nicolás Bertolo
29	DF	ARG	Gabriel Paletta

== Milan ==
Head coach: (Italy) Carlo Ancelotti

Note: Flags indicate national team as defined under FIFA eligibility rules; some limited exceptions apply. Players may hold more than one non-FIFA nationality.

No.	Pos.	Nation	Player
1	GK	BRA	Dida
2	DF	BRA	Cafu
3	DF	ITA	Paolo Maldini
4	DF	GEO	Kakha Kaladze
5	MF	BRA	Emerson
8	MF	ITA	Gennaro Gattuso
9	FW	ITA	Filippo Inzaghi
10	MF	NED	Clarence Seedorf
11	FW	ITA	Alberto Gilardino
13	DF	ITA	Alessandro Nesta
16	GK	AUS	Zeljko Kalac
17	DF	CRO	Dario Šimić
18	DF	CZE	Marek Jankulovski
19	DF	ITA	Giuseppe Favalli
20	MF	FRA	Yoann Gourcuff
21	MF	ITA	Andrea Pirlo
22	MF	BRA	Kaká
23	MF	ITA	Massimo Ambrosini
25	DF	ITA	Daniele Bonera
27	MF	BRA	Serginho
29	GK	ITA	Valerio Fiori
32	MF	ITA	Cristian Brocchi
44	DF	ITA	Massimo Oddo
99	FW	BRA	Ronaldo

== Étoile du Sahel ==
Head coach: (France) Bertrand Marchand

Note: Flags indicate national team as defined under FIFA eligibility rules; some limited exceptions apply. Players may hold more than one non-FIFA nationality.

No.	Pos.	Nation	Player
1	GK	TUN	Aymen Mathlouthi
2	DF	TUN	Saif Ghezal
3	FW	TUN	Slim Jedaied
4	DF	TUN	Radhouène Felhi
5	DF	TUN	Ammar El Jemal
6	DF	TUN	Hatem Bejaoui
7	FW	CPV	Gilson Silva
9	FW	TUN	Amine Chermiti
10	MF	TUN	Afouène Gharbi
11	DF	TUN	Mehdi Meriah
13	DF	TUN	Saber Ben Frej
14	MF	GUI	Mohamed Sacko
15	DF	TUN	Mahmoud Khemiri
16	GK	TUN	Nadim Thabet
18	MF	TUN	Mejdi Traoui
19	MF	TUN	Mohamed Ali Nafkha
20	MF	TUN	Khaled Melliti
21	DF	TUN	Mejdi Ben Mohamed
24	MF	GHA	Moussa Narry
25	MF	BEN	Mouritala Ogunbiyi
26	MF	TUN	Bassem Ben Nasser
27	GK	TUN	Ahmed Jaouachi
28	FW	TUN	Mehdi Ben Dhifallah

== Pachuca ==
Head coach: (Mexico) Enrique Meza

Note: Flags indicate national team as defined under FIFA eligibility rules; some limited exceptions apply. Players may hold more than one non-FIFA nationality.

No.	Pos.	Nation	Player
1	GK	COL	Miguel Calero
2	DF	MEX	Leobardo López
3	DF	PAR	Julio Manzur
4	DF	MEX	Marco Pérez
6	MF	MEX	Jaime Correa
7	FW	ARG	Damian Álvarez
8	MF	MEX	Gabriel Caballero
9	FW	MEX	Rafael Márquez Lugo
10	MF	COL	Andrés Chitiva
11	FW	MEX	Juan Carlos Cacho
12	GK	MEX	Alfonso Blanco
13	DF	MEX	Fernando Salazar
14	DF	MEX	Marvin Cabrera
16	MF	MEX	Gerardo Rodríguez
17	MF	MEX	Edy Brambila
18	FW	COL	Luis Gabriel Rey
19	MF	ARG	Christian Giménez
20	GK	MEX	Humberto Hernández
21	DF	MEX	Fausto Pinto
22	DF	MEX	Paul Aguilar
24	MF	MEX	Raúl Martínez
28	MF	MEX	Luis Montes
30	GK	MEX	Rodolfo Cota

== Urawa Red Diamonds ==
Head coach: (Germany) Holger Osieck

Note: Flags indicate national team as defined under FIFA eligibility rules; some limited exceptions apply. Players may hold more than one non-FIFA nationality.

No.	Pos.	Nation	Player
1	GK	JPN	Norihiro Yamagishi
2	DF	JPN	Keisuke Tsuboi
3	MF	JPN	Hajime Hosogai
4	DF	JPN	Marcus Tulio Tanaka
5	DF	BRA	Nenê
6	MF	JPN	Nobuhisa Yamada
8	MF	JPN	Shinji Ono
9	FW	JPN	Yuichiro Nagai
11	FW	JPN	Tatsuya Tanaka
12	DF	JPN	Shunsuke Tsutsumi
13	MF	JPN	Keita Suzuki
14	MF	JPN	Tadaaki Hirakawa
16	MF	JPN	Takahito Soma
17	MF	JPN	Makoto Hasebe
18	FW	JPN	Junki Koike
19	MF	JPN	Hideki Uchidate
20	MF	JPN	Satoshi Horinouchi
21	FW	BRA	Washington
22	MF	JPN	Yuki Abe
23	GK	JPN	Ryota Tsuzuki
27	MF	JPN	Yoshiya Nishizawa
28	GK	JPN	Nobuhiro Kato
30	FW	JPN	Masayuki Okano

== Sepahan ==
Head coach: (Croatia) Luka Bonačić

Note: Flags indicate national team as defined under FIFA eligibility rules; some limited exceptions apply. Players may hold more than one non-FIFA nationality.

No.	Pos.	Nation	Player
1	GK	IRN	Abbas Mohammadi
3	DF	IRN	Reza Talabeh
4	MF	IRN	Moharram Navidkia
5	DF	IRN	Hadi Aghili
6	MF	IRN	Jalal Akbari
7	MF	IRN	Farshad Bahadorani
8	DF	IRN	Mohsen Bengar
9	MF	IRN	Hadi Jafari
10	MF	IRN	Hojat Zadmahmoud
11	MF	IRN	Hossein Kazemi
12	MF	IRQ	Abdul-Wahab Abu Al-Hail
13	FW	IRN	Mahmoud Karimi
14	FW	NGA	Kabir Bello
15	GK	IRN	Amir Hossein Sadeghzadeh
17	DF	GEO	Jaba Mujiri
20	FW	IRQ	Emad Mohammed
21	MF	IRN	Saeid Bayat
22	GK	IRN	Mohammad Savari
23	FW	IRN	Mehdi Seyed Salehi
25	MF	IRN	Ebrahim Loveinian
26	FW	IRN	Jalaledin Alimohammadi
27	MF	IRN	Abolhassan Jafari
28	DF	IRN	Ehsan Hajsafi
30	MF	IRN	Hossein Papi

== Waitakere United ==
Head coach: (New Zealand) Chris Milicich

Note: Flags indicate national team as defined under FIFA eligibility rules; some limited exceptions apply. Players may hold more than one non-FIFA nationality.

No.	Pos.	Nation	Player
1	GK	NZL	Richard Gillespie
2	DF	NZL	Jonathan Perry
3	DF	NZL	Shane Pascoe
4	DF	NZL	Matt Cunneen
5	DF	NZL	Danny Hay
6	DF	ENG	Darren Bazeley
7	MF	NZL	Jason Hayne
8	FW	SOL	Commins Menapi
9	FW	SOL	Benjamin Totori
10	FW	NZL	Allan Pearce
11	MF	ENG	Neil Sykes
13	FW	NZL	Daniel Koprivcic
14	MF	NZL	Hoani Edwards
15	MF	WAL	Christopher Bale
16	MF	ENG	Neil Emblen
17	MF	NZL	Jake Butler
19	MF	NZL	Mikael Munday
20	DF	NZL	Jason Rowley
21	DF	NZL	Graham Pearce
22	GK	NZL	Simon Eaddy
27	DF	NZL	Tom Webb
28	GK	NZL	Arran Rowley
33	MF	WAL	Paul Seaman
