= 2007–08 JS Kabylie season =

JS Kabylie
2007–08 season
- President: Mohand Chérif Hannachi
- Head Coach: Moussa Saïb
- Stadium: Stade du 1^{er} Novembre 1954
- National 1: 1st
- Algerian Cup: Round of 64
- CAF Confederation Cup: Play-off round
- CAF Champions League: 2007: Group stage 2008: Second round
- Top goalscorer: League: Nabil Hemani (16 goals); All: Nabil Hemani (19 goals)

The 2007–08 season was JS Kabylie's 43rd season in the Algerian top flight, They competed in National 1, the Algerian Cup, the CAF Confederation Cup and the Champions League.

== Squad list ==
Players and squad numbers last updated on 18 November 2007.
Note: Flags indicate national team as has been defined under FIFA eligibility rules. Players may hold more than one non-FIFA nationality.

No.	Nat.	Position	Name	Date of Birth (Age)	Signed from
Goalkeepers
12	(Algeria)	GK	Nabil Mazari	18 February 1984 (aged 23)	(Algeria) Youth system
13	(Algeria)	GK	Mourad Berrefane	18 March 1986 (aged 21)	(Algeria) Youth system
26	(Algeria)	GK	Faouzi Chaouchi	5 December 1984 (aged 23)	(Algeria) JS Bordj Ménaïel
Defenders
3	(Algeria)	CB	Brahim Zafour	30 November 1977 (aged 30)	(Algeria) Youth system
20	(Mali)	CB	Demba Barry	4 November 1987 (aged 20)	(Mali) AS Real Bamako
31	(Mali)	CB	Idrissa Coulibaly	9 December 1987 (aged 20)	(Mali) JS Centre Salif Keita
4	(Algeria)	CB	Mohamed Aït Kaci	20 June 1986 (aged 21)	(Algeria) Youth system
6	(Algeria)	CB	Sid Ahmed Khedis	22 August 1985 (aged 22)	(Algeria) NA Hussein Dey
5	(Algeria)	CB	Sofiane Harkat	26 January 1984 (aged 23)	(Algeria) USM El Harrach
29	(Algeria)	CB	Elyazid Maddour	14 October 1987 (aged 20)	(Algeria) Youth system
30	(Algeria)	RB	Mohamed Rabie Meftah	5 May 1985 (aged 22)	(Algeria) Youth system
24	(Algeria)	LB	Nassim Oussalah	8 October 1981 (aged 26)	(Algeria) MO Béjaïa
23	(Algeria)	LB	Sofiane Bengoureïne	10 October 1984 (aged 23)	(Algeria) ASM Oran
Midfielders
18	(Algeria)	DM	Lamara Douicher	10 March 1980 (aged 27)	(Algeria) NR Béni Douala
	(Algeria)	DM	Nassim Dehouche	12 August 1982 (aged 25)	(Algeria) JSM Bejaïa
	(Algeria)	DM	Lyes Saidi	24 August 1987 (aged 20)	(Algeria) ORB Akbou
8	(Algeria)	CM	Chérif Abdeslam	1 September 1978 (aged 29)	(Algeria) NA Hussein Dey
22	(Algeria)	CM	Nabil Hamouda	4 January 1983 (aged 24)	(Algeria) Paradou AC
	(Algeria)	CM	Mokhtar Lamhene	18 January 1990 (aged 17)	(Algeria) Youth system
28	(Algeria)	AM	Tayeb Berramla	6 January 1985 (aged 22)	(Algeria) ASM Oran
11	(Algeria)	AM	Yacine Amaouche	26 June 1979 (aged 28)	(Algeria) CA Batna
Forwards
14	(Algeria)	LW	Boubeker Athmani	11 November 1981 (aged 26)	(Algeria) USM Annaba
27	(Benin)		Wassiou Oladipupo	17 December 1983 (aged 24)	(Libya) Olympic Azzaweya
19	(Algeria)		Nabil Hemani	1 September 1979 (aged 28)	(Algeria) OMR El Annasser
9	(Algeria)		Youcef Saïbi	22 August 1982 (aged 25)	(Algeria) WR Bentalha
7	(Algeria)		Adlène Bensaïd	3 November 1981 (aged 26)	(Algeria) USM Blida
16	(Algeria)		Mohamed Derrag	3 April 1985 (aged 22)	(Algeria) OMR El Annasser
15	(Mali)	LW	Issa Traoré	9 September 1979 (aged 28)	(Iran) PAS Tehran

== Competitions ==
=== Overview ===
Competition	Record								Started round	Final position / round	First match	Last match
Competition	G	W	D	L	GF	GA	GD	Win %	Started round	Final position / round	First match	Last match
National 1	30	18	5	7	46	24	+22	60.00	—N/a	Champion	23 August 2007	26 May 2008
Algerian Cup	1	0	1	0	1	1	+0	0.00	Round of 64		27 December 2007	
2007 Champions League	4	1	1	2	4	7	−3	25.00	Group stage		21 July 2007	1 September 2007
2008 Champions League	4	2	1	1	5	4	+1	50.00	First round	Second round	21 March 2008	9 May 2008
Confederation Cup	2	1	1	0	2	1	+1	50.00	Play-off round		11 July 2008	27 July 2008
Total	41	22	9	10	58	37	+21	53.66				

Updated to match played 3 June 2019
Source: Competitions

=== National 1 ===
==== League table ====
Pos	Team	Pld	W	D	L	GF	GA	GD	Pts	Qualification or relegation
1	JS Kabylie	30	18	5	7	46	24	+22	59	Qualification for Champions League
2	ASO Chlef	30	13	10	7	29	22	+7	49	Qualification for Champions League
3	ES Sétif	30	12	8	10	32	27	+5	43 (Note: ES Sétif were deducted 1 point.)	Qualification for Confederation Cup
4	USM Alger	30	12	6	12	32	27	+5	42	Qualification for Arab Champions League
5	USM Annaba	30	12	6	12	36	37	−1	42	Qualification for Arab Champions League

Source: DZFoot
Rules for classification: 1) points; 2) head-to-head points; 3) head-to-head goal difference; 4) goal difference; 5) total goals; 6) fairplay ranking; 7) playoff.

==== Results summary ====
Overall								Home						Away					
Pld	W	D	L	GF	GA	GD	Pts	W	D	L	GF	GA	GD	W	D	L	GF	GA	GD
30	18	5	7	46	24	+22	59	14	1	0	30	6	+24	4	4	7	16	18	−2

Last updated: 22 April 2018.
Source: Competitive matches

==== Results by round ====
Round	1	2	3	4	5	6	7	8	9	10	11	12	13	14	15	16	17	18	19	20	21	22	23	24	25	26	27	28	29	30
Ground	A	A	H	A	H	A	H	A	H	A	H	A	H	A	H	H	H	A	H	A	H	A	H	A	H	A	H	A	H	A
Result	L	D	W	W	W	W	D	W	W	L	W	D	W	D	W	W	W	L	W	L	W	D	W	L	W	W	W	L	W	L
Position	15	11	5	4	3	2	3	1	1	1	1	1	1	1	1	1	1	1	1	1	1	1	1	1	1	1	1	1	1	1

Source: Competitive matches
A = Away; H = Home; W = Win; D = Draw; L = Loss

=== Matches ===
Win Draw Loss

23 August 2007 Round 1	USM Alger	1–0	JS Kabylie	Bologhine
17:00	Boucherit 60'			Stadium: Stade Omar Hammadi; Referee: Houari Belkacem

10 September 2007 Round 2	USM Annaba	2–2	JS Kabylie	Annaba
21:00	Messaoud 47' (pen.), 87'		Amaouche 37'; Hemani 41'	Stadium: Stade 19 Mai 1956; Referee: Mustapha Boumediene Mansouri

6 September 2007 Round 3	JS Kabylie	2–0	MC Saïda	Tizi Ouzou
17:00	Hemani 30'; Bensaïd 68'			Stadium: Stade 1er Novembre 1954; Referee: Mohamed Khelifi

14 September 2007 Round 4	JSM Béjaïa	2–4	JS Kabylie	Béjaïa
15:30	Chaouch 81', 90+3'		Berramla 55'; Amaouche 73'; Hemani 90+1'	Stadium: Stade de l'Unité Maghrébine; Referee: Mohamed Amine Benaissa

20 September 2007 Round 5	JS Kabylie	2–0	OMR El Annasser	Tizi Ouzou
15:00	Hemani 58'; Bensaïd 77'			Stadium: Stade 1er Novembre 1954; Referee: Houari Belkacem

8 October 2007 Round 6	MC Oran	1–2	JS Kabylie	Oran
23:00	El Bahari 85'		Berramla 22'; Barry 30'	Stadium: Stade Ahmed Zabana; Referee: Djamel Haimoudi

18 October 2007 Round 7	JS Kabylie	2–2	USM Blida	Tizi Ouzou
15:30	Derrag 39'; Amaouche 68'		Zemouchi 37'; Chellali 90'	Stadium: Stade 1er Novembre 1954; Referee: Mokhtar Amalou

25 October 2007 Round 8	MC Alger	0–2	JS Kabylie	Algiers
20:00			Saïbi 1'; Galoul 66' (o.g.)	Stadium: Stade 5 Juillet 1962; Referee: Mustapha Boumediene Mansouri

29 October 2007 Round 9	JS Kabylie	6–1	WA Tlemcen	Tizi Ouzou
14:30	Meftah 22'; Bensaïd 77', 80'		Yaâlaoui 90'	Stadium: Stade 1er Novembre 1954; Referee: Abdelhamid Aouiti

9 November 2007 Round 10	ASO Chlef	2–0	JS Kabylie	Chlef
14:30	Soudani 40'; Biyaga 73'			Stadium: Stade Mohamed Boumezrag; Referee: Sofiane Bousseter

15 November 2007 Round 11	JS Kabylie	1–0	ES Sétif	Tizi Ouzou
14:30	Derrag 52'			Stadium: Stade 1er Novembre 1954; Referee: Mohamed Bichari

23 November 2007 Round 12	NA Hussein Dey	0–0	JS Kabylie	Algiers
14:30				Stadium: Stade Frères Zioui; Attendance: 0 (close doors); Referee: Mohamed Amine Benaissa

7 December 2007 Round 13	JS Kabylie	2–1	AS Khroub	Tizi Ouzou
14:30	Hemani 50', 90'		Rouane 48'	Stadium: Stade 1er Novembre 1954; Referee: Said Benamara

13 December 2007 Round 14	CR Belouizdad	0–0	JS Kabylie	Algiers
14:30				Stadium: Stade 20 Août 1955; Referee: Mohamed Khelifi

24 December 2007 Round 15	JS Kabylie	1–0	CA Bordj Bou Arréridj	Tizi Ouzou
14:30	Bensaïd 42'			Stadium: Stade 1er Novembre 1954; Referee: Djamel Haimoudi

14 January 2008 Round 16	JS Kabylie	1–0	USM Alger	Tizi Ouzou
14:30	Amaouche 53'			Stadium: Stade 1er Novembre 1954; Referee: Belkacem Boumaza

18 January 2008 Round 17	JS Kabylie	1–0	USM Annaba	Tizi Ouzou
15:00	Hemani 90'			Stadium: Stade 1er Novembre 1954; Referee: Mohamed Ould Abdellah

24 January 2008 Round 18	MC Saïda	3–2	JS Kabylie	Saïda
14:30	Hamidi 9'; Seguer 17'; Ould Teguedi 87'		Hemani 48', 62'	Stadium: Stade 13 Avril 1958; Referee: Mohamed Amine Benaissa

31 January 2008 Round 19	JS Kabylie	4–2	JSM Béjaïa	Tizi Ouzou
14:30	Hemani 25', 45+1', 48'; Amaouche 59'		Chaouch 20'; Boukemacha 90+2'	Stadium: Stade 1er Novembre 1954; Referee: Mohamed Bichari

8 February 2008 Round 20	OMR El Annasser	1–0	JS Kabylie	Algiers
15:00	Ali Moussa 90+2'			Stadium: Stade 20 Août 1955; Referee: Okba Benbaka

14 February 2008 Round 21	JS Kabylie	2–0	MC Oran	Tizi Ouzou
14:30	Hemani 61'; Chaib 75' (o.g.)			Stadium: Stade 1er Novembre 1954; Referee: Abdelhamid Aouiti

29 February 2008 Round 22	USM Blida	1–1	JS Kabylie	Blida
15:00	Diss 45'		Coulibaly 85'	Stadium: Stade Mustapha Tchaker; Referee: Mohamed Benouza

6 March 2008 Round 23	JS Kabylie	1–0	MC Alger	Tizi Ouzou
14:30	Bensaïd 33'			Stadium: Stade 1er Novembre 1954; Referee: Mohamed Amine Benaissa

13 March 2008 Round 24	WA Tlemcen	1–0	JS Kabylie	Tlemcen
14:30	Deghiche 33'			Stadium: Stade des 3 Frères; Referee: Belkacem Boumaza

31 March 2008 Round 25	JS Kabylie	1–0	ASO Chlef	Tizi Ouzou
15:30	Coulibaly 84'			Stadium: Stade 1er Novembre 1954; Referee: Mohamed Bichari

18 April 2008 Round 26	ES Sétif	0–3	JS Kabylie	Sétif
19:00				Stadium: Stade 8 Mai 1945

21 April 2008 Round 27	JS Kabylie	3–0	NA Hussein Dey	Tizi Ouzou
15:30	Bensaïd 1'; Hemani 52', 77'			Stadium: Stade 1er Novembre 1954; Attendance: 0 (close doors); Referee: Djamel Haimoudi

5 May 2008 Round 28	AS Khroub	2–0	JS Kabylie	El Khroub
15:30	Oukil 23'; Belhadef 41'			Stadium: Stade Abed Hamdani; Referee: Mohamed Benouza

12 May 2008 Round 29	JS Kabylie	1–0	CR Belouizdad	Tizi Ouzou
15:30	Hemani 12'			Stadium: Stade 1er Novembre 1954; Referee: Abdelhamid Aouiti

26 May 2008 Round 30	CA Bordj Bou Arréridj	2–0	JS Kabylie	Bordj Bou Arréridj
15:30	Hachoud 25', 42'			Stadium: Stade 20 Août 1955; Referee: Mokhtar Adda Bendia

== Algerian Cup ==
27 December 2007 Round of 64	MC El Eulma	1–1 (a.e.t.) (5–4 p)	JS Kabylie	Béjaïa
14:00	Fellahi 44'	Report	Athmani 41'	Stadium: Stade de l'Unité Maghrébine; Referee: Houasnia, Boulkrinat, Badache
Note: Lineup for JS Kabylie - Berrefane, Meftah (Saïbi 80'), Oussalah, Khedis, Harkat, Douicher, Hamouda (Aït Kaci 91'), Berramla, Hemani, Amaouche (Ait Hocine 106'), Athmani.

== 2007 Champions League ==
=== Group stage ===
==== Group A ====
Pos	Team	Pld	W	D	L	GF	GA	GD	Pts	Qualification	ESS	ITT	JSK	FAR
1	(Tunisia) Étoile du Sahel	6	3	2	1	6	2	+4	11	Advance to knockout stage	—	0–0	3–0	0–0
2	(Libya) Al-Ittihad	6	3	1	2	6	4	+2	10	Advance to knockout stage	2–0	—	1–0	2–0
3	(Algeria) JS Kabylie	6	2	1	3	6	8	−2	7		0–2	3–1	—	2–0
4	(Morocco) FAR Rabat	6	1	2	3	2	6	−4	5		0–1	1–0	1–1	—

Source: CAF

21 July 2007 3	Étoile du Sahel (Tunisia)	3–0	(Algeria) JS Kabylie	Sousse
19:10 CEST	Chermiti 1'; Ben Mohamed 48'; Silva Alves 53'			Stadium: Stade Olympique de Sousse; Referee: Rene Louzaya (Congo)

3 August 2007 4	JS Kabylie (Algeria)	0–2	(Tunisia) Étoile du Sahel	Tizi Ouzou
21:00 CET			Ogunbiyi 46'; Chermiti 90+2'	Stadium: Stade 1er Novembre; Referee: Abdel Rahman Khalid (Sudan)

17 August 2007 5	JS Kabylie (Algeria)	3–1	(Libya) Al-Ittihad	Tizi Ouzou
20:00 CET	Athmani 22'; Hemani 54'; Saïbi 69'		Rewani 19'	Stadium: Stade 1er Novembre; Referee: Aboubacar Sharaf (Ivory Coast)

1 September 2007 6	FAR Rabat (Morocco)	1–1	(Algeria) JS Kabylie	Rabat
19:00 WET	Benkassou 22' (pen.)		Derrag 85'	Stadium: Stade Moulay Abdellah; Referee: Diouf Abdou (Senegal)

== 2008 Champions League ==
=== First round ===
21 March 2008 First leg	JS Kabylie (Algeria)	3–0	(Ghana) Ashanti Gold SC	Tizi Ouzou
16:00 UTC+1	Amaouche 3'; Hemani 9', 53'			Stadium: Stade 1er Novembre 1954; Referee: Djamel Nbiya (Libya)

4 April 2008 Second leg	Ashanti Gold SC (Ghana)	0–0 (0–3 agg.)	(Algeria) JS Kabylie	Obuasi
--:-- UTC+1				Stadium: Len Clay Stadium; Referee: Yves Roponat (Gabon)

=== Second round ===
27 April 2008 First leg	Coton Sport (Cameroon)	3–0	(Algeria) JS Kabylie	Garoua
--:-- UTC+1	Zaoua 21' (pen.); Kamilou 44', 58'			Stadium: Roumdé Adjia Stadium; Referee: Verson Lwanja (Malawi)

9 May 2008 Second leg	JS Kabylie (Algeria)	2–1 (2–4 agg.)	(Cameroon) Coton Sport	Tizi Ouzou
--:-- UTC+1	Bensaïd 6'; Chaouchi 89' (pen.)		Zaoua 45'	Stadium: Stade 1er Novembre 1954; Referee: Slim Jedidi (Tunisia)

== CAF Confederation Cup ==
=== Play-off round ===
11 July 2008 First leg	JS Kabylie (Algeria)	1–1	(Cameroon) Les Astres FC	Tizi Ouzou
--:-- UTC+1	Bensaïd 90'			Stadium: Stade 1er Novembre 1954; Referee: Lassina Pare (Burkina Faso)

27 July 2008 Second leg	Les Astres FC (Cameroon)	0–1 (1–2 agg.)	(Algeria) JS Kabylie	Yaoundé
--:-- UTC+1			Berramla 78'	Stadium: Stade Ahmadou Ahidjo; Referee: Noumandiez Doue (Ivory Coast)

== Squad information ==
=== Playing statistics ===
No.	Pos	Nat	Player	Total		National 1		Algerian Cup		Champions League		Confederation Cup	
No.	Pos	Nat	Player	Apps	Goals	Apps	Goals	Apps	Goals	Apps	Goals	Apps	Goals
12	GK	(Algeria) ALG	Mourad Berrefane	4	0	3	0	1	0	0	0	0	0
13	GK	(Algeria) ALG	Faouzi Chaouchi	33	1	24	0	0	0	7	1	2	0
26	GK	(Algeria) ALG	Nabil Mazari	4	0	3	0	0	0	1	0	0	0
3	DF	(Algeria) ALG	Brahim Zafour	19	0	16	0	0	0	3	0	0	0
20	DF	(Mali) MLI	Demba Barry	29	1	22	1	0	0	7	0	0	0
31	DF	(Mali) MLI	Idrissa Coulibaly	15	2	9	2	0	0	4	0	2	0
4	DF	(Algeria) ALG	Mohamed Aït Kaci	9	0	5	0	1	0	1	0	2	0
6	DF	(Algeria) ALG	Sid Ahmed Khedis	18	0	14	0	1	0	3	0	0	0
5	DF	(Algeria) ALG	Sofiane Harkat	14	0	11	0	1	0	2	0	0	0
29	DF	(Algeria) ALG	Elyazid Maddour	3	0	3	0	0	0	0	0	0	0
30	DF	(Algeria) ALG	Mohamed Rabie Meftah	33	1	24	1	1	0	6	0	2	0
	DF	(Algeria) ALG	Mohamed Oussalem Benhocine	1	0	1	0	0	0	0	0	0	0
24	DF	(Algeria) ALG	Nassim Oussalah	24	0	19	0	1	0	3	0	1	0
18	MF	(Algeria) ALG	Lamara Douicher	36	0	25	0	1	0	8	0	2	0
	MF	(Algeria) ALG	Nassim Dehouche	30	0	25	0	0	0	4	0	1	0
	MF	(Algeria) ALG	Lyes Saidi	2	0	2	0	0	0	0	0	0	0
8	MF	(Algeria) ALG	Chérif Abdeslam	32	0	23	0	0	0	7	0	2	0
22	MF	(Algeria) ALG	Nabil Hamouda	17	0	11	0	1	0	4	0	1	0
	MF	(Algeria) ALG	Mokhtar Lamhene	1	0	1	0	0	0	0	0	0	0
28	MF	(Algeria) ALG	Tayeb Berramla	35	3	24	2	1	0	8	0	2	1
11	MF	(Algeria) ALG	Yacine Amaouche	30	6	23	5	1	0	4	1	2	0
	MF	(Algeria) ALG	Abderazak Chebbah	1	0	1	0	0	0	0	0	0	0
	MF	(Algeria) ALG	Chabane Ait Hocine	2	0	1	0	1	0	0	0	0	0
14	FW	(Algeria) ALG	Boubeker Athmani	22	6	17	4	1	1	4	1	0	0
27	FW	(Benin) BEN	Wassiou Oladipupo	13	0	6	0	0	0	5	0	2	0
19	FW	(Algeria) ALG	Nabil Hemani	31	19	25	16	1	0	5	3	0	0
9	FW	(Algeria) ALG	Youcef Saïbi	21	2	13	1	1	0	7	1	0	0
7	FW	(Algeria) ALG	Adlène Bensaïd	18	9	13	7	0	0	3	1	2	1
16	FW	(Algeria) ALG	Mohamed Derrag	28	3	21	2	0	0	5	1	2	0
15	FW	(Algeria) ALG	Ghiles Dekkal	0	0	0	0	0	0	0	0	0	0
Players transferred out during the season
23	DF	(Algeria) ALG	Sofiane Bengoureïne	4	0	1	0	0	0	3	0	0	0
	MF	(Algeria) ALG	Ali Bendebka	1	0	0	0	0	0	1	0	0	0
	FW	(Mali) MLI	Issa Traoré	3	0	0	0	0	0	3	0	0	0

Last updated: 13 November 2020

=== Goalscorers ===
Includes all competitive matches. The list is sorted alphabetically by surname when total goals are equal.

No.	Nat.	Player	Pos.	L 1	AC	CL 1	CC 3	TOTAL
19	(Algeria)	Nabil Hemani	FW	16	0	3	0	19
7	(Algeria)	Adlène Bensaïd	FW	7	0	1	1	9
11	(Algeria)	Yacine Amaouche	MF	5	0	1	0	6
14	(Algeria)	Boubeker Athmani	FW	4	1	1	0	6
28	(Algeria)	Tayeb Berramla	MF	2	0	0	1	3
31	(Mali)	Idrissa Coulibaly	DF	2	0	0	0	2
16	(Algeria)	Mohamed Derrag	FW	2	0	1	0	2
30	(Algeria)	Mohamed Rabie Meftah	DF	1	0	0	0	1
20	(Mali)	Demba Barry	DF	1	0	0	0	1
9	(Algeria)	Youcef Saïbi	FW	1	0	1	0	1
26	(Algeria)	Faouzi Chaouchi	GK	0	0	1	0	1
Own Goals				0	0	0	0	0
Totals				46	1	9	2	58

== Transfers ==
=== In ===
Date	Pos	Player	From club	Transfer fee	Source
10 June 2007	FW	(Mali) Issa Traoré	(Iran) PAS Tehran	Undisclosed	
1 July 2007	MF	(Algeria) Nabil Hamouda	Paradou AC	Undisclosed	
1 July 2007	MF	(Algeria) Nassim Dehouche	JSM Béjaïa	Undisclosed	
1 July 2007	MF	(Algeria) Yacine Amaouche	CA Batna	Undisclosed	
1 January 2008	FW	(Algeria) Adlène Bensaïd	USM Alger	Undisclosed	
4 January 2008	DF	(Mali) Idrissa Coulibaly	(Mali) Centre Salif Keita	Undisclosed	

=== Out ===
Date	Pos	Player	To club	Transfer fee	Source
21 June 2007	FW	(Algeria) Hamza Yacef	(Morocco) Wydad Casablanca	300,000 €	
2 July 2007	FW	(Mali) Cheick Oumar Dabo	(France) Le Havre	1,500,000 €	
