= 2007 CAF Champions League group stage =

- Dates: 22 July – 2 September 2007

Tournament statistics
- Matches played: 24
- Goals scored: 42 (1.75 per match)

The group stage of the 2007 CAF Champions League was played from 22 July to 2 September 2007. A total of eight teams competed in the group stage, the group winners and runners-up advance to the Knockout stage playing semifinal rounds before the final.

== Format ==
In the group stage, each group was played on a home-and-away round-robin basis. The winners and the runners-up of each group advanced to the Knockout stage.

== Groups ==
Key to colours in group tables
Group winners and runners-up advance to the Knockout stage

=== Group A ===
Pos	Team	Pld	W	D	L	GF	GA	GD	Pts	Qualification
1	(Tunisia) Étoile du Sahel	6	3	2	1	6	2	+4	11	Advance to knockout stage
2	(Libya) Al-Ittihad	6	3	1	2	6	4	+2	10	Advance to knockout stage
3	(Algeria) JS Kabylie	6	2	1	3	6	8	−2	7	
4	(Morocco) FAR Rabat	6	1	2	3	2	6	−4	5	

Source: CAF
Rules for classification: Group stage tiebreakers
22 June 2007
21:00 EET

Al-Ittihad (Libya)	1–0	(Algeria) JS Kabylie
Camara 83'	(Report)

June 11 Stadium, Tripoli
Attendance: 25 000
Referee: Modou Sowe (Gambia)
23 June 2007
20:00 WET

FAR Rabat (Morocco)	0–1	(Tunisia) Étoile du Sahel
	(Report)	Ben Frej 70'

Stade Moulay Abdellah, Rabat
Attendance: 32 000
Referee: Koman Coulibaly (Mali)

6 July 2007
20:00 CET

JS Kabylie (Algeria)	2–0	(Morocco) FAR Rabat
Dabo 29' (pen.), 44'	(Report)

Stade 1er Novembre, Tizi Ouzou
Referee: Coffi Codjia (Benin)
7 July 2007
19:10 CEST

Étoile du Sahel (Tunisia)	0–0	(Libya) Al-Ittihad
	(Report)

Stade Olympique de Sousse, Sousse
Referee: Lassina Pare (Burkina Faso)

21 July 2007
20:00 WET

FAR Rabat (Morocco)	1–0	(Libya) Al-Ittihad
Ouaddouch 90+3'	(Report)

Stade Moulay Abdellah, Rabat
Referee: Emmanuel Imiere (Nigeria)
21 July 2007
19:10 CEST

Étoile du Sahel (Tunisia)	3–0	(Algeria) JS Kabylie
Chermiti 1'; Ben Mohamed 48'; Silva Alves 53'	(Report)

Stade Olympique de Sousse, Sousse
Referee: Rene Louzaya (Congo)

3 August 2007
19:30 EET

Al-Ittihad (Libya)	2–0	(Morocco) FAR Rabat
Shibani 44'; Rewani 61'

June 11 Stadium, Tripoli
Referee: Essam Abd El Fatah (Egypt)
3 August 2007
21:00 CET

JS Kabylie (Algeria)	0–2	(Tunisia) Étoile du Sahel
		Ogunbiyi 46'; Chermiti 90+2'

Stade 1er Novembre, Tizi Ouzou
Referee: Abdel Rahman Khalid (Sudan)

17 August 2007
20:00 CET

JS Kabylie (Algeria)	3–1	(Libya) Al-Ittihad
Athmani 22'; Hemani 54'; Saïbi 69'		Rewani 19'

Stade 1er Novembre, Tizi Ouzou
Referee: Aboubacar Sharaf (Ivory Coast)
18 August 2007
19:10 CEST

Étoile du Sahel (Tunisia)	0–0	(Morocco) FAR Rabat

Stade Olympique de Sousse, Sousse
Referee: Alex Kotey (Ghana)

1 September 2007
21:00 EET

Al-Ittihad (Libya)	2–0	(Tunisia) Étoile du Sahel
Shibani 14'; Rewani 58'(pen)

June 11 Stadium, Tripoli
Referee: Kokou Djaoupe (Togo)
1 September 2007
19:00 WET

FAR Rabat (Morocco)	1–1	(Algeria) JS Kabylie
Benkassou 22' (pen.)		Derrag 85'

Stade Moulay Abdellah, Rabat
Referee: Diouf Abdou (Senegal)

=== Group B ===
Pos	Team	Pld	W	D	L	GF	GA	GD	Pts	Qualification
1	(Egypt) Al Ahly SC	6	4	0	2	8	4	+4	12	Advance to knockout stage
2	(Sudan) Al-Hilal	6	3	1	2	8	5	+3	10	Advance to knockout stage
3	(Ivory Coast) ASEC Mimosas	6	2	1	3	4	5	−1	7	
4	(Tunisia) Espérance de Tunis	6	1	2	3	2	8	−6	5	

Source: CAF
Rules for classification: Group stage tiebreakers
23 June 2007
19:10 CEST

Espérance (Tunisia)	0–0	(Ivory Coast) ASEC Mimosas
	(Report)

Stade El Menzah, Tunis
Referee: Eddy Maillet (Seychelles)
24 June 2007
20:30 EEST

Al Ahly SC (Egypt)	2–0	(Sudan) Al-Hilal
Flavio 84'; Hosny 90+2'	(Report)

Cairo International Stadium, Cairo
Referee: Badara Diatta (Senegal)

8 July 2007
20:30 EAT

Al-Hilal (Sudan)	2–0	(Tunisia) Espérance
Eze 29' 90+2'	(Report)

AlHilal Stadium, Omdurman
Attendance: 40,000
Referee: Muhmed Ssegonga (Uganda)
8 July 2007
15:00 GMT

ASEC Mimosas (Ivory Coast)	0–1	(Egypt) Al Ahly SC
	(Report)	Aboutreika 40'

Stade Félix Houphouët-Boigny, Abidjan
Referee: Kenias Marange (Zimbabwe)

20 July 2007
20:00 EEST

Al Ahly SC (Egypt)	3–0	(Tunisia) Espérance
Aboutreika 12'; Flavio 77'; Hosny 85'	(Report)

Cairo International Stadium, Cairo
Attendance: 30,000
Referee: Djamel Haimoudi (Algeria)
22 July 2007
20:00 EAT

Al-Hilal (Sudan)	2–1	(Ivory Coast) ASEC Mimosas
Eze 12'; Mohamed 90'	(Report)	Idrissu 52'

AlHilal Stadium, Omdurman
Attendance: 40,000
Referee: Abderrahim El Arjoun (Morocco)

4 August 2007
19:10 CEST

Espérance (Tunisia)	1–0	(Egypt) Al Ahly SC
Kasdaoui 38'

Stade 7 November, Radès
Referee: Aldrin Ncobo (South Africa)
5 August 2007
15:30 GMT

ASEC Mimosas (Ivory Coast)	1–0	(Sudan) Al-Hilal
N'Gossan 30'

Stade Félix Houphouët-Boigny, Abidjan
Referee: Divine Evehe (Cameroon)

19 August 2007
20:30 EAT

Al-Hilal (Sudan)	3–0	(Egypt) Al Ahly SC
Khan 56'; Korongo 67'; Eze 85'

AlHilal Stadium, Omdurman
Referee: Mohamed Benouza (Algeria)
19 August 2007
15:00 GMT

ASEC Mimosas (Ivory Coast)	2–0	(Tunisia) Espérance
Zaïem 60' (o.g.); Diarra 78'

Stade Félix Houphouët-Boigny, Abidjan
Referee: Jean-Marie Hicuburundi (Burundi)

2 September 2007
19:00 CEST

Espérance (Tunisia)	1–1	(Sudan) Al-Hilal
Ltaief 41'		Eze 44' (pen.)

Stade El Menzah, Tunis
Referee: Lassina Paré (Burkina Faso)
2 September 2007
20:00 EEST

Al Ahly SC (Egypt)	2–0	(Ivory Coast) ASEC Mimosas
Flavio 76'; Aboutreika 90'

Cairo International Stadium, Cairo
Referee: Mohamed Guezzaz (Morocco)
