= 2008 CAF Super Cup =

ES Sahel	CS Sfaxien
(Tunisia)	(Tunisia)
2	1
- Date: 23 February 2008
- Venue: Stade 7 November, Tunis
- Referee: Djamel Haimoudi (Algeria)

The 2008 CAF Super Cup was the 16th CAF Super Cup, an annual football match in Africa organized by the Confederation of African Football (CAF), between the winners of the previous season's two CAF club competitions, the CAF Champions League and the CAF Confederation Cup. The match was contested by 2007 CAF Champions League winners, ES Sahel, and 2007 CAF Confederation Cup winners, CS Sfaxien at the Stade 14 January in Tunis on 23 February 2008.

This was only the third time that the African Super Cup was contested by teams from the same country (after all-Egyptian Super Cups in 1994 and 1997), and the first ever involving two Tunisian clubs.

== Teams ==
Team	Qualification	Previous participation (bold indicates winners)
(Tunisia) ES Sahel	2007 CAF Champions League winner	**1998**, 2004, 2007
(Tunisia) CS Sfaxien	2007 CAF Confederation Cup winner	None

== Match details ==
23 February 2008

ES Sahel (Tunisia)	2 – 1	(Tunisia) CS Sfaxien
Chermiti 4'; Felhi 48'	Report	Opoku 26'

Stade 7 November, Tunis
Attendance: 60,000
Referee: Djamel Haimoudi (Algeria)

**Étoile du Sahel**	**CS Sfaxien**

Étoile du Sahel:
GK	(Tunisia) Aymen Mathlouthi
DF	(Tunisia) Mejdi Traoui
DF	(Tunisia) Souheïl Ben Radhia
DF	(Tunisia) Mehdi Meriah
DF	(Tunisia) Radhouène Felhi
DF	(Tunisia) Ammar Jemal
MF	(Tunisia) Mohamed Ali Nafkha
MF	(Tunisia) Afouène Gharbi	(substituted off) 71'
MF	(Cape Verde) Gilson Silva	(substituted off) 84'
MF	(Tunisia) Mehdi Ben Dhifallah
FW	(Tunisia) Amine Chermiti
Substitutes:
MF	(Benin) Mouritala Ogunbiyi	(substituted on) 71'
FW	(Ghana) Moussa Narry	(substituted on) 84'
Manager:
(France) Bertrand Marchand

CS Sfaxien:
GK	(Tunisia) Lotfi Saidi
DF	(Tunisia) Fateh Gharbi	(substituted off) 83'
DF	(Tunisia) Karim Ben Amor
DF	(Tunisia) Hamdi Rouid
DF	(Tunisia) Mohamed Bouzidi
MF	(Tunisia) Chaker Bargawi
MF	(Tunisia) Chadi Hammami	(substituted off) 68'
MF	(Tunisia) Fraj Bnouni	(substituted off) 59'
MF	(Guinea) Naby Soumah
FW	(Ivory Coast) Blaise Kouassi
FW	(Ghana) Agyeman Opoku
Substitutes:
MF	(Tunisia) Ahmed Hleli	(substituted on) 59'
DF	(Democratic Republic of the Congo) Guy Lusadisu Basisila	(substituted on) 68'
DF	(Mauritania) Dominique da Silva	(substituted on) 83'
Manager:
(Switzerland) Michel Decastel

CAF Super Cup 2008

**Étoile du Sahel**
**Second title**

== See also ==
- 2007 CAF Champions League
- 2007 CAF Confederation Cup
