= 2007 CAF Champions League knockout stage =

The knockout stage of the 2007 CAF Champions League was played from 21 September to 9 November 2007.

== Bracket ==
Semi-finals
(Sudan)	Al-Hilal	2	1	3
(Tunisia)	Étoile du Sahel	1	3	4
(Libya)	Al-Ittihad	0	0	0
(Egypt)	Al Ahly	0	1	1

Final
(Tunisia)	Étoile du Sahel	0	3	3
(Egypt)	Al Ahly	0	1	1

== Semi-finals ==
The first legs were played on 21–23 September and the second legs on 5–7 October.

Team 1	Agg.	Team 2	1st leg	2nd leg
Al Hilal (Sudan)	3–4	(Tunisia) Étoile du Sahel	2–1	1–3
Al-Ittihad (Libya)	0–1	(Egypt) Al Ahly SC	0–0	0–1

21 September 2007
21:00 GMT

Al-Hilal (Sudan)	2–1	(Tunisia) Étoile du Sahel
Eze 62'; Osunwa 66'		Felhi 38'

Al-Hilal Stadium, Omdurman
Referee: Koman Coulibaly (Mali)
6 October 2007
21:30 GMT

Étoile du Sahel (Tunisia)	3–1	(Sudan) Al-Hilal
Chermiti 16', 62'; Ben Frej 52'		Eze 55'

Stade Olympique de Sousse, Sousse
Referee: Eddy Maillet (Seychelles)

23 September 2007
22:00 GMT

Al-Ittihad (Libya)	0–0	(Egypt) Al Ahly SC

11 June Stadium, Tripoli
Referee: Djamel Haimoudi (Algeria)
7 October 2007
21:30 GMT

Al-Ahly SC (Egypt)	1–0	(Libya) Al-Ittihad
Hamadi 20' (o.g.)

Cairo International Stadium, Cairo
Referee: Kotey Alex (Ghana)

== Final ==
Team 1	Agg.	Team 2	1st leg	2nd leg
Étoile du Sahel (Tunisia)	3–1	(Egypt) Al Ahly SC	0–0	3–1

27 October 2007
18:00 GMT

Étoile du Sahel (Tunisia)	0–0	(Egypt) Al Ahly SC

Stade Olympique de Sousse, Sousse
Attendance: 25,000
Referee: Evehe Divine (Cameroon)
9 November 2007
17:30 GMT

Al Ahly SC (Egypt)	1–3	(Tunisia) Étoile du Sahel
El-Nahhas 48'		Gharbi 44'; Chermiti 90+3'; Narry 90+5'

Cairo International Stadium, Cairo
Attendance: 74,000
Referee: Abderrahim El Arjoun (Morocco)
