= 2007 FIFA Club World Cup =

2007 edition of the FIFA Club World Cup

FIFA Club World Cup Japan 2007 presented by Toyota Toyota プレゼンツ FIFAクラブワールドカップ ジャパン2007

Tournament details
- Host country: Japan
- Dates: 7–16 December
- Teams: 7 (from 6 confederations)
- Venues: 3 (in 3 host cities)

Final positions
- Champions: (Italy) Milan (1st title)
- Runners-up: (Argentina) Boca Juniors
- Third place: (Japan) Urawa Red Diamonds
- Fourth place: (Tunisia) Étoile du Sahel

Tournament statistics
- Matches played: 7
- Goals scored: 21 (3 per match)
- Attendance: 315,279 (45,040 per match)
- Top scorer(s): Washington (Urawa Red Diamonds); 3 goals
- Best player: Kaká (Milan)
- Fair play award: (Japan) Urawa Red Diamonds

The 2007 FIFA Club World Cup (officially known as the FIFA Club World Cup Japan 2007 presented by Toyota for sponsorship reasons) was a football tournament played in Japan from 7 to 16 December 2007. It was the fourth FIFA Club World Cup, a tournament organised by FIFA for the winners of each confederation's top continental club tournament.

Seven teams from the six confederations entered the tournament; the other team was the host country's representatives, usually the league champions. Defending champions Internacional did not qualify as they were eliminated in the second stage of the 2007 Copa Libertadores.

Italian side Milan became the first European team to win the Club World Cup with a 4–2 victory over Argentinian club Boca Juniors in the final. That title made them the most successful team in the world in terms of official international trophies won (18).

== Host bids ==
The FIFA Executive Committee appointed Japan as hosts of the 2007 tournament on 15 September 2006 during their meeting in Zürich, Switzerland.

== Qualified teams ==
Location of teams of the 2007 FIFA Club World Cup

The qualified teams were decided during 2007 through the six major continental competitions. The winner of each regional club championship participated in the 2007 Club World Cup. In March 2007, the FIFA executive committee introduced a qualifying playoff between the 2007 OFC Champions League champion and the host nation's 2007 J. League champion, as opposed to previous years, in which the Oceania champions were given direct entry into the tournament. In order to avoid the participation of two teams from the same country, the best-placed non-Japanese team in the AFC Champions League would take the "host" berth if a Japanese team won that competition, which indeed happened as Urawa Red Diamonds won the 2007 AFC Champions League. Also, the fifth-place match was eliminated for this edition.

It was the first participation in the FIFA Club World Cup for all seven teams that qualified.

Team	Confederation	Qualification	Participation
Entering in the semi-finals
(Italy) Milan	UEFA	Winners of 2006–07 UEFA Champions League	Debut
(Argentina) Boca Juniors	CONMEBOL	Winners of 2007 Copa Libertadores	Debut
Entering in the quarter-finals
(Tunisia) Étoile du Sahel	CAF	Winners of 2007 CAF Champions League	Debut
(Japan) Urawa Red Diamonds	AFC	Winners of 2007 AFC Champions League	Debut
(Mexico) Pachuca	CONCACAF	Winners of 2007 CONCACAF Champions' Cup	Debut
Entering in the play-off for quarter-finals
(Iran) Sepahan	AFC (host) (Note: Sepahan took the host Japan's slot as Urawa Red Diamonds won the 2007 AFC Champions League. As a result, the winners of the 2007 J.League Division 1, later determined to be Kashima Antlers on 1 December 2007, missed out on participating.)	Runners-up of 2007 AFC Champions League	Debut
(New Zealand) Waitakere United	OFC	Winners of 2007 OFC Champions League	Debut

== Venues ==
Tokyo, Yokohama and Toyota were the three cities to serve as venues for the 2007 FIFA Club World Cup.

Yokohama	Tokyo	Toyota
International Stadium Yokohama	National Stadium	Toyota Stadium
35°30′36.16″N 139°36′22.49″E	35°40′41.00″N 139°42′53.00″E	35°05′04.02″N 137°10′14.02″E
Capacity: 72,327	Capacity: 57,363	Capacity: 45,000
2007 FIFA Club World Cup (Japan)

== Squads ==
For a list of all the squads of this tournament, see the article 2007 FIFA Club World Cup squads.

== Match officials ==
Confederation	Referee	Assistant referees
AFC	Mark Shield (Australia); Hiroyoshi Takayama (Japan)	Ben Wilson (Australia); Nathan Gibson (Australia)
CAF	Coffi Codjia (Benin)	Evarist Menkouande (Cameroon); Celestin Ntagungira (Rwanda)
CONCACAF	Marco Antonio Rodríguez (Mexico)	Jose Luis Camargo (Mexico); Pedro Rebollar (Mexico)
CONMEBOL	Jorge Larrionda (Uruguayan)	Mauricio Espinosa (Uruguayan); Miguel Nievas (Ecuador)
OFC	Peter O'Leary (New Zealand)	Brent Best (New Zealand); Matthew Taro (Solomon Islands)
UEFA	Claus Bo Larsen (Denmark)	Bill Hansen (Denmark); Henryk Sonderby (Turkey)

== Matches ==
Play-off for quarter-finals
7 December – Tokyo
(Iran) Sepahan	3
(New Zealand) Waitakere United	1

Quarter-finals
9 December – Tokyo
(Tunisia) Étoile du Sahel	1
(Mexico) Pachuca	0
10 December – Toyota
(Iran) Sepahan	1
(Japan) Urawa Red Diamonds	3

Semi-finals
12 December – Tokyo
(Tunisia) Étoile du Sahel	0
(Argentina) Boca Juniors	1
13 December – Yokohama
(Japan) Urawa Red Diamonds	0
(Italy) Milan	1

Final
16 December – Yokohama
(Argentina) Boca Juniors	2
(Italy) Milan	4
Match for third place
16 December – Yokohama
(Tunisia) Étoile du Sahel	2 (2)
(Japan) Urawa Red Diamonds (p)	2 (4)

All times local (UTC+9)

=== Play-off for quarter-finals ===
7 December 2007
19:45

Sepahan (Iran)	3–1	(New Zealand) Waitakere United
Emad 3', 4'; Abu Al-Hail 47'	Report	Aghili 74' (o.g.)

National Stadium, Tokyo
Attendance: 24,788
Referee: Marco Rodríguez (Mexico)

=== Quarter-finals ===
9 December 2007
14:45

Étoile du Sahel (Tunisia)	1–0	(Mexico) Pachuca
Narry 85'	Report

National Stadium, Tokyo
Attendance: 34,934
Referee: Mark Shield (Australia)

10 December 2007
19:30

Sepahan (Iran)	1–3	(Japan) Urawa Red Diamonds
Karimi 80'	Report	Nagai 32'; Washington 54'; Aghili 70' (o.g.)

Toyota Stadium, Toyota
Attendance: 33,263
Referee: Coffi Codjia (Benin)

=== Semi-finals ===
12 December 2007
19:30

Étoile du Sahel (Tunisia)	0–1	(Argentina) Boca Juniors
	Report	Cardozo 37'

National Stadium, Tokyo
Attendance: 37,255
Referee: Claus Bo Larsen (Denmark)

13 December 2007
19:30

Urawa Red Diamonds (Japan)	0–1	(Italy) Milan
	Report	Seedorf 68'

International Stadium Yokohama, Yokohama
Attendance: 67,005
Referee: Jorge Larrionda (Uruguay)

=== Match for third place ===
16 December 2007
16:00

Étoile du Sahel (Tunisia)	2–2	(Japan) Urawa Red Diamonds
Ben Frej 5' (pen.); Chermiti 75'	Report	Washington 35', 70'
Penalties
Nafkha (penalty missed); Ghezal (penalty scored); Ben Nasser (penalty scored); Traoui (penalty missed)	2–4	(penalty scored) Washington; (penalty scored) Abe; (penalty scored) Nagai; (penalty scored) Hosogai

International Stadium Yokohama, Yokohama
Attendance: 53,363
Referee: Peter O'Leary (New Zealand)

=== Final ===
16 December 2007
19:30

Boca Juniors (Argentina)	2–4	(Italy) Milan
Palacio 22'; Ledesma 85'	Report	Inzaghi 21', 71'; Nesta 50'; Kaká 61'

International Stadium Yokohama, Yokohama
Attendance: 68,263
Referee: Marco Rodríguez (Mexico)

== Goalscorers ==
Rank	Player	Team	Goals
1	(Brazil) Washington	(Japan) Urawa Red Diamonds	3
2	(Italy) Filippo Inzaghi	(Italy) Milan	2
2	(Iraq) Emad Mohammed	(Iran) Sepahan	2
4	(Iraq) Abdul-Wahab Abu Al-Hail	(Iran) Sepahan	1
4	(Tunisia) Saber Ben Frej	(Tunisia) Étoile du Sahel	1
4	(Argentina) Neri Cardozo	(Argentina) Boca Juniors	1
4	(Tunisia) Amine Chermiti	(Tunisia) Étoile du Sahel	1
4	(Brazil) Kaká	(Italy) Milan	1
4	(Iran) Mahmoud Karimi	(Iran) Sepahan	1
4	(Japan) Yuichiro Nagai	(Japan) Urawa Red Diamonds	1
4	(Ghana) Moussa Narry	(Tunisia) Étoile du Sahel	1
4	(Italy) Alessandro Nesta	(Italy) Milan	1
4	(Argentina) Rodrigo Palacio	(Argentina) Boca Juniors	1
4	(Netherlands) Clarence Seedorf	(Italy) Milan	1

1 own goal

- (Italy) Massimo Ambrosini (Milan, against Boca Juniors)

2 own goals

- (Iran) Hadi Aghili (Sepahan, against Waitakere United and Urawa Red Diamonds)

== Awards ==
Adidas Golden Ball Toyota Award	Adidas Silver Ball	Adidas Bronze Ball
(Brazil) Kaká (Milan)	(Netherlands) Clarence Seedorf (Milan)	(Argentina) Rodrigo Palacio (Boca Juniors)
FIFA Fair Play Award
(Japan) Urawa Red Diamonds
