= Champions League 2007 =

Champions League 2007 may refer to:

- AFC Champions League 2007
- CAF Champions League 2007
- UEFA Champions League 2006–07
- UEFA Champions League 2007-08
