= Blaise Kouassi =

Blaise Kouassi may refer to:

- Blaise Kouassi (footballer, born 1975), former Ivorian football defender
- Blaise Kouassi (footballer, born 1983), Ivorian footballer
