= CWC 2007 =

CWC 2007 may refer to:

- FIFA Club World Cup 2007, in football (soccer)
- 2007 Cricket World Cup, in cricket
