= Richard Gillespie =

English cricketer

Personal information
- Full name: Richard Henry Gillespie
- Born: 10 September 1878; Morpeth, Northumberland, England
- Died: 20 May 1952 (aged 73); Balham, Kent, England
- Batting: Unknown
- Bowling: Unknown
- Relatives: Derek Gillespie (nephew)

Domestic team information
- Years: Team
- 1901–1904: Northumberland

Career statistics
Competition	First-class
Matches	3
Runs scored	10
Batting average	2.50
100s/50s	–/–
Top score	8
Balls bowled	432
Wickets	3
Bowling average	69.66
5 wickets in innings	–
10 wickets in match	–
Best bowling	3/89
Catches/stumpings	2/–
- Source: Cricinfo, 14 June 2019

Richard Henry Gillespie (10 September 1878 – 20 May 1952) was an English first-class cricketer.

Gillespie was born at Morpeth in September 1878. He debuted in minor counties cricket for Northumberland in the 1901 Minor Counties Championship. He played minor counties cricket for Northumberland until 1904, making twelve appearances in the Minor Counties Championship. He later played first-class cricket for H. D. G. Leveson Gower's XI, debuting for the team against Cambridge University at Eastbourne in 1909. He made two further first-class appearances for the team, both in 1911 at Eastbourne against Cambridge University and Oxford University. He scored 10 runs in these three matches, as well as taking 3 wickets. Gillespie died at Balham in May 1952. His nephew, Derek Gillespie, also played first-class cricket.
