= Mehdi Ben Dhifallah =

Tunisian footballer

Personal information
- Date of birth: 6 May 1983 (age 43)
- Place of birth: Kelibia, Nabeul, Tunisia
- Height: 1.87 m (6 ft 2 in)
- Position: Striker

Youth career
- US Kelibia

Senior career*
Years	Team	Apps	(Gls)
2004–2007	ES Zarzis	58	(26)
2007–2010	Étoile du Sahel	61	(39)
2010	Nasr Benghazi	18	(8)
2010–2011	Al-Merreikh	0	(0)
2011–2012	Stade Tunisien	7	(0)
2012–2013	Widzew Łódź	25	(6)
2013–2014	Al-Nasr Benghazi	24	(16)
2015–2016	Shabab Al-Ordon	0	(0)
2016–2017	Hammam Sousse		

International career
2005–2012	Tunisia	16	(7)
- * Club domestic league appearances and goals

Mehdi Ben Dhifallah (Arabic: مَهْدِيّ بْن ضَيْف الله; born 6 May 1983) is a Tunisian former professional footballer who played as a striker.

== Career ==
Ben Dhifallah scored his first league goal for Étoile du Sahel against Jendouba Sport during the 2nd round of the 2007–08 season. He has also played for Étoile du Sahel in the 2007 CAF Champions League., Ben Dhifallah joined Étoile Sportive du Sahel from Tunisian Ligue Professionnelle 1 rival Espérance Sportive de Zarzis in June 2007. In February 2010 moving to Libyan Premier League club Nasr.

== Honours ==
ES Zarzis

- Tunisian Cup: 2004–05

Étoile du Sahel

- CAF Champions League: 2007
- CAF Super Cup: 2008

Nasr Benghazi

- Libyan Cup: 2009–10

Al-Merreikh

- Sudan Cup: 2010
