= 2009 North African Cup Winners Cup =

The 2009 North African Cup Winners Cup was the second edition of the competition initiated in 2008 by the UNAF. CS Sfaxien of Tunisia were crowned champions after defeating Ahly Benghazi of Libya in the final on the away goals rule.

== Participating teams ==
- (Algeria) Chabab Riadhi de Belouizdad (2008-09 Algerian Cup winners)
- (Libya) Ahly Benghazi (Invited)
- (Morocco) Forces Armées Royales Rabat (2008-09 Coupe du Trône winners)
- (Tunisia) Club Sportif Sfaxien (2008-09 Tunisian President Cup winners)

== Draw ==
The draw was made in Djerba, Tunisia on 25 July 2009 at a FNAF meeting.

=== Semi-finals ===
==== First Legs ====
October 13, 2009

FAR Rabat (Morocco)	0 – 0	(Libya) Ahly Benghazi
		Mamour Baidan (yellow card) 60'

Stade Moulay Abdellah, Rabat
Referee: (Tunisia) Awaaz Trabelsi

October 27, 2009

CR Belouizdad (Algeria)	0 – 1	(Tunisia) CS Sfaxien
		Hamza Younes 30'; Jassem Khalloufi (yellow card) 40'; Haythem Mrabet (yellow card) 55'

Stade 20 Août 1955, Mohamed Belouizdad
Referee: (Morocco) Bouchaib El Ahrach

==== Second Legs ====
November 22, 2009
14:00 GMT

CS Sfaxien (Tunisia)	4 – 1	(Algeria) CR Belouizdad
Abdelkarim Nafti 20' (pen.), 90+3' (pen.); Haykel Guemamdia 85'; Hamza Younes 90+6'		Sofiane Younès 26' (pen.)

Stade Taïeb Mhiri, Sfax
Referee: (Libya) Mohammed Rajab

CS Sfaxien win 5–1 on aggregate.

November 23, 2009

Ahly Benghazi (Libya)	1 – 0	(Morocco) FAR Rabat
Samir Al Wahaj 12'; Ibrahim al Abaidy (yellow card) 31'; Ahmed al Masly (yellow card) 61'; Abdulrahman al Amaami (yellow card) 85'; Ahmed al Ammari (yellow card) 90+1'	(Report) (in Arabic)	Abderrahmane Mssassi (red card) 35'

9 July Stadium, Misrata
Referee: (Algeria) Mohamed Bichari

Ahly Benghazi win 1–0 on aggregate.

=== Final ===
==== First leg ====
December 11, 2009

Ahly Benghazi (Libya)	1 – 1	(Tunisia) CS Sfaxien
Samir al Wahaj (penalty missed) 55' (yellow card) 82'; Abdulrahman al Amaami 78'	Report (in Arabic)	Dominique da Silva 20'

Martyrs of February Stadium, Benina
Attendance: 10,550 (capacity)
Referee: (Morocco) Said Tahri

==== Second leg ====
December 20, 2009

CS Sfaxien (Tunisia)	0 – 0	(Libya) Ahly Benghazi
Amine Abbés (red card) 87'	Report (in Arabic)	Ahmed al Ammari (yellow card) 20'; Ibrahim al Abaidy (yellow card) 23'; Fraj Bnouni (yellow card) 50'; Ifeanyi Frederick Onuigbo (red card) 87'

Stade Taieb Mhiri, Sfax
Attendance: 8,500
Referee: (Algeria) Djamel Haimoudi

Ahly Benghazi 1–1 CS Sfaxien on aggregate. CS Sfaxien win on the away goals rule

2009 North African Cup Winners Cup Winners
(Tunisia)
CS Sfaxien
First title
