= Blaise Kouassi (footballer, born 1983) =

Ivorian footballer

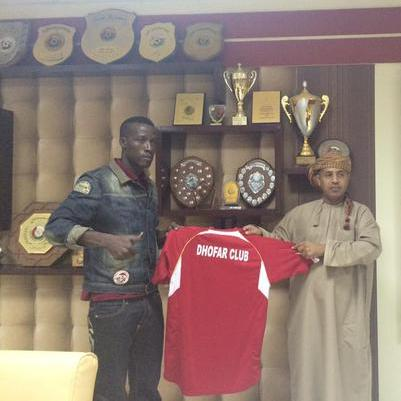
- Kouassi with Dhofar in 2015

Personal information
- Date of birth: 1 September 1983 (age 43)
- Place of birth: Kondiebouman, Ivory Coast
- Height: 1.92 m (6 ft 4 in)
- Position: Forward

Youth career
- 2002–2003: Stella d'Adjamé

Senior career*
Years	Team	Apps	(Gls)
2003–2004	Africa Sports d'Abidjan		
2004–2009	Sfaxien	78	(57)
2009–2012	Al-Shaab	50	(25)
2012–2013	Stade Tunisien		
2013–2014	Horoya		
2015	Dhofar		(2)
- * Club domestic league appearances and goals

Blaise Kouassi (born 1 September 1983) is an Ivorian former professional footballer who played as a forward.

== Career ==
=== Youth career ===
Born and raised in Kondiebouman, Ivory Coast, Kouassi began his footballing career in 2002 with Abidjan-based club, Stella Club d'Adjamé.

=== Africa Sports d'Abidjan ===
Kouassi began his professional footballing career in 2003 with Ligue 1 club, Africa Sports d'Abidjan.

=== Sfaxien ===
Kouassi first moved out of Ivory Coast in 2004 to Tunisia where he signed a long-term contract with Tunisian Ligue Professionnelle 1 club, CS Sfaxien. In his five-year spell with the Sfax-based club, he helped them win the 2004–05 Tunisian Ligue Professionnelle 1, the 2008–09 Tunisian Cup, the CAF Confederation Cup in 2007 and 2008 and the 2009 North African Cup Winners Cup. He also helped them achieve the runners-up position in the 2004–05 Arab Champions League, the 2006 CAF Champions League and the CAF Super Cup in 2008 and 2009.

=== Al-Shaab ===
In 2009, Kouassi again moved out of Ivory Coast and this time to the Middle East and more accurately to the United Arab Emirates where he signed a three-year contract with UAE First Division League club, Al-Shaab CSC. He made his debut and scored his first goal for the club on 28 August 2009 in a 2009–10 UAE President's Cup match in a 6–0 win over Al-Jazira Al-Hamra FC. In the tournament, he put up an eye-catching performance for the club which included a hat trick on 24 September 2009 in a 5–0 win over Al-Jazira Al-Hamra FC, and a brace each on 3 September 2009 in a 4–0 win over Dibba Al-Hisn Sports Club and on 8 October 2009 in a 6–1 win over Masafi Club. He made his Etisalat Emirates Cup qualification debut and scored his first goal in the competition on 16 October 2009 in a 2–2 draw against Al-Ittihad Kalba SC. In the qualification process, he put up a great show as he scored 8 goals in 9 appearances which included a brace against Al-Ittihad Kalba SC. He made his UAE First Division League debut on 6 February 2010 in a 2–0 win over Al-Urooba and scored his first goal in the very next game on 13 February 2010 in a 1–0 win over Dubai CSC. He scored 9 goals in 7 appearances in the 2009–10 UAE President's Cup and helped his club reach the Round of 16 of the competition. He also scored 8 goals in 9 appearances in qualification to the 2009–10 Etisalat Emirates Cup. He also scored 7 goals in 13 appearances in the 2009–10 UAE First Division League, finishing as the top scorer of the season for the club and the 9th top scorer overall in the 2009–10 UAE First Division League.

In his second consecutive season with the club, he made his first appearance and scored his first goal for the club on 26 August 2010 in a 2010–11 Etisalat Emirates Cup qualification match in a 1–0 win over Al-Arabi. He also made an appearance in the 2010–11 UAE President's Cup in the Round of 32 on 21 September 2010 in a 1–0 loss against Al-Shabab. He made his first appearance and scored his first goal in the 2010–11 UAE First Division League on 9 December 2012 in a 3–1 win over Dibba Al-Fujairah. He scored 8 goals in 17 appearances in the 2010–11 UAE First Division League. He also scored 5 goals in 8 appearances in qualification to the 2010–11 Etisalat Emirates Cup.

In his third consecutive season with the club, he made his first appearance on 6 October 2011 in a 2011–12 Etisalat Emirates Cup qualification match in a 2–1 loss against Al-Khaleej Club and scored his first goal in the same competition on 10 November 2011 in a 3–0 win over Dibba Al-Fujairah. He made his 2011–12 UAE First Division League debut on 24 November 2011 in a 1–1 draw against Masafi Club and scored his first goal on 5 December 2011 in a 3–2 loss against Dibba Al-Fujairah. He scored 10 goals in 20 appearances in the 2011–12 UAE First Division League. He also scored 1 goal in 3 appearances in qualification to the 2011–12 Etisalat Emirates Cup, thus ending his long-term stay with the Sharjah-based club.

=== Stade Tunisien ===
In 2012, Kouassi once again moved out to Tunisia where he signed a one-year contract with another Tunisian Ligue Professionnelle 1 club, Stade Tunisien.

=== Horoya ===
In 2013, Kouassi again moved out of Ivory Coast and this time to Guinea where he signed a one-year contract with Guinée Championnat National club, Horoya AC. In his one-year spell with the Conakry-based club, he helped them win the 2014 Guinée Coupe Nationale.

=== Dhofar ===
On 27 January 2015, Kouassi signed a six-month contract with Oman Professional League club, Dhofar S.C.S.C. He scored his first goal for the club on 6 March 2015 in a 2–0 win over 2013–14 Oman Professional League runners-up, Fanja SC.

== Career statistics ==
Appearances and goals by club, season and competition
Club	Season	League			Cup		Continental		Other		Total	
Club	Season	Division	Apps	Goals	Apps	Goals	Apps	Goals	Apps	Goals	Apps	Goals
Al-Shaab	2009–10	UAE First Division League	13	7	16	17	0	0	0	0	29	24
Al-Shaab	2010–11	UAE First Division League	17	8	9	5	0	0	0	0	26	13
Al-Shaab	2011–12	UAE First Division League	20	10	3	1	0	0	0	0	23	11
Al-Shaab	Total		50	25	28	23	0	0	0	0	78	48
Dhofar	2014–15	Oman Professional League	7	2	1	0	0	0	0	0	8	2
Career total			57	27	29	23	0	0	0	0	86	50

== Honours ==
Sfaxien

- Tunisian Ligue Professionnelle 1: 2004–05
- Tunisian Cup: 2008–09
- CAF Champions League runner-up: 2006
- CAF Confederation Cup: 2007, 2008
- CAF Super Cup runner-up 2008, 2009
- North African Cup Winners Cup: 2009
- Arab Champions League runner-up: 2004–05

Horoya

- Guinée Coupe Nationale: 2014

Dhofar

- Oman Professional League Cup runner-up: 2014–15
