= Lotfi Saïdi =

Tunisian footballer

Personal information
- Full name: Lotfi Saïdi
- Date of birth: 8 June 1982 (age 44)
- Place of birth: Tunisia
- Height: 6 ft 5 in (1.96 m)
- Position: Goalkeeper

Team information
- Current team: SC Ben Arous

Senior career*
Years	Team	Apps	(Gls)
2003–2009	CS Sfaxien		
2009–2010	AS Kasserine		
2010–2011	Floriana		
2011–2013	ES Beni-Khalled		
2013–2014	Jendouba Sport		
2014–2015	AS Djerba		
2015–2016	AS Soliman		
2016–2018	SC Ben Arous		
2018–2019	CS Korba		
2019–	SC Ben Arous		
- * Club domestic league appearances and goals as of September 4, 2009

Lotfi Saïdi (born 8 June 1982 in Tunisia) is a Tunisian soccer player who currently plays for SC Ben Arous, where he plays as a goalkeeper.
