= Souheïl Ben Radhia =

Tunisian footballer

Personal information
- Full name: Souheïl Ben Radhia
- Date of birth: 26 August 1985 (age 41)
- Place of birth: Bizerte, Tunisia
- Height: 1.76 m (5 ft 9 1/2 in)
- Position: Defender

Senior career*
Years	Team	Apps	(Gls)
2004–2005	CA Bizertin	4	(0)
2005–2007	Espérance Tunis	8	(0)
2007	CA Bizertin	11	(0)
2008–2010	Étoile Sportive du Sahel	15	(1)
2010–2012	Widzew Łódź	32	(0)
2012–2013	CA Bizertin	1	(0)

International career
2008–2010	Tunisia	3	(0)
- * Club domestic league appearances and goals

Souheïl Ben Radhia (born 26 August 1985) is a Tunisian former professional footballer who played as a defender,

== Career ==
On 2 March 2010, Polish club Widzew Łódź signed him from Étoile Sportive du Sahel.

He made his I liga debut on 27 March 2010.

== Honours ==
Widzew Łódź

- I liga: 2009–10
