= Derek Gillespie (cricketer) =

English cricketer and lawyer

Personal information
- Full name: Derek William Gillespie
- Born: 26 April 1917; Aberford, Yorkshire, England
- Died: 21 August 1981 (aged 64); Oxton, Yorkshire, England
- Batting: Right-handed
- Bowling: Right-arm medium-fast Right-arm off break

Domestic team information
- Years: Team
- 1938–1939: Cambridge University

Career statistics
Competition	First-class
Matches	10
Runs scored	155
Batting average	12.91
100s/50s	–/1
Top score	60
Balls bowled	1,442
Wickets	22
Bowling average	31.04
5 wickets in innings	–
10 wickets in match	–
Best bowling	4/48
Catches/stumpings	2/–
- Source: Cricinfo, 24 December 2021

Derek William Gillespie (26 April 1917 – 21 August 1981) was an English first-class cricketer and solicitor.

Gillespie was born at Aberford in West Yorkshire in April 1917. He was educated at Uppingham School, where he captained the school cricket team in 1936. From Uppingham he went up to Clare College, Cambridge. He played first-class cricket for Cambridge University Cricket Club, making his debut against Northamptonshire in 1938. The following year he secured the final place in the Cambridge side and went onto make eight first-class appearances in 1939. Picked primarily to play as a right-arm fast-medium bowler, with the Cambridge side having a shortage of spin bowlers, Gillespie change to bowling off breaks from June 1939. In ten first-class matches for Cambridge, Gillespie took 22 wickets at an average of 31.04 and with best figures of 4 for 48, which came against Surrey at The Oval in 1939 when he dismissed four of the first five Surrey batsman. His change of bowling style was present in seven of his ten first-class matches. Described as a "solid batsman" by Wisden, he scored a total of 155 runs with one half century, a score of 60, which was made in three hours against the Free Foresters in 1939.

Gillespie completed his studies in 1939 and immediately went into military service with the Royal Artillery as a second lieutenant in September. He served throughout the Second World War and relinquished his commission in May 1946, on account of ill health and was granted the honorary rank of major. After his military service, Gillespie qualified as a solicitor and was a partner in the legal firm Middletons. Gillespie died in August 1981 at Oxton, Yorkshire.
