= 2007 CAF Champions League =

Confederation of African Football Champions League

Tournament details
- Dates: 26 January – 9 November
- Teams: 60

Final positions
- Champions: (Tunisia) Étoile du Sahel (1st title)
- Runners-up: (Egypt) Al Ahly

Tournament statistics
- Matches played: 131
- Goals scored: 282 (2.15 per match)
- Top scorer: (Democratic Republic of the Congo) Mabi Mputu (9 goals)

The 2007 CAF Champions League was the 43rd occurrence of the CAF Champions League, the most prestigious club football competition in Africa. Étoile du Sahel of Tunisia became champions for the first time, beating Al Ahly SC of Egypt 3–1 in a two-legged final. Étoile du Sahel participated in the 2007 FIFA Club World Cup in Japan as the representative from CAF.

== Qualifying rounds ==
=== Preliminary round ===
The 1st legs were played on 26–28 January 2007.
The 2nd legs were played on 9–11 February 2007.

Team 1	Agg.	Team 2	1st leg	2nd leg
Highlanders (Zimbabwe)	1–1 (9–8 p)	(Mauritius) Pamplemousses SC	1–0	0–1
Mamelodi Sundowns (South Africa)	6–2	(Eswatini) Royal Leopards	4–2	2–0
JS Saint-Pierroise (Réunion)	w/o^{1}	(Mozambique) Desportivo Maputo	–	–
Zamalek (Egypt)	5–1	(Burundi) Vital'O FC	4–1	1–0
Al-Hilal (Sudan)	6–0	(Zanzibar) Polisi	4–0	2–0
Asante Kotoko (Ghana)	1–1 (2–4 p)	(The Gambia) Gambia Ports Authority	1–0	0–1
ASFA Yennenga (Burkina Faso)	1–3	(Nigeria) Nasarawa United	1–1	0–2
Fello Star (Guinea)	3–1	(Cape Verde) Sporting Clube da Praia	0–1	3–0^{2}
ASC Diaraf (Senegal)	1–2	(Togo) Maranatha	1–0	0–2
FC Saint Eloi Lupopo (Democratic Republic of the Congo)	1–4	(Rwanda) APR FC	1–2	0–2
USM Alger (Algeria)	3–3 (a)	(Niger) AS-FNIS	3–1	0–2
Al-Ittihad (Libya)	4–0	(Benin) Mogas 90 FC	3–0	1–0
Canon Yaoundé (Cameroon)	1–2	(Republic of the Congo) Étoile du Congo	1–0	0–2
Saint-George SA (Ethiopia)	w/o^{3}	(Malawi) Super ESCOM	–	–
Wydad AC (Morocco)	5–2	(Mauritania) ASC Mauritel Mobile FC	4–0	1–2
Stade Malien (Mali)	1–4 ^{4}	(Senegal) AS Douanes	1–2	0–2
Ocean Boys FC (Nigeria)	0–1	(Sierra Leone) Kallon	0–0	0–1
Petro Atlético (Angola)	2–1	(Namibia) FC Civics	1–0	1–1
Young Africans FC (Tanzania)	5–1	(Comoros) AJSM	5–1	^{5}
Likhopo (Lesotho)	0–1	(Zambia) Zanaco FC	0–0	0–1
Espérance (Tunisia)	6–1	(Chad) Renaissance FC	4–0	2–1
Renacimiento FC (Equatorial Guinea)	0–2	(Ghana) Ashanti Gold SC	0–1	0–1
TP Mazembe (Democratic Republic of the Congo)	7–2	(Botswana) Police XI	3–0	4–2
AS ADEMA (Madagascar)	3–0	(Seychelles) Anse Réunion FC	0–0	3–0
JS Kabylie (Algeria)	5–2	(Guinea-Bissau) Clube de Futebol "Os Balantas"	3–1	2–1
CD Primeiro de Agosto (Angola)	1–2	(Gabon) AS Mangasport	0–1	1–1
Coton Sport FC (Cameroon)	3–0	Uganda Revenus Authority SC	3–0	0–0
Séwé Sports (Ivory Coast)	3–2	(Liberia) Mighty Barrolle	3–1	0–1

^{1} JS Saint-Pierroise withdrew on the weekend before the tie due to high travel costs; they were banned from CAF competitions for three years and fined $3500.
^{2} Sporting Clube da Praia refused to travel to Guinea due to civil unrest and a violent general strike.
^{3} Super ESCOM withdrew.
^{4} AS Douanes were ejected from the competition for fielding an ineligible player.
^{5} The tie was played over one leg as AJSM did not have a FIFA or CAF-standard stadium.

=== First round ===
1st legs were played on 2–4 March 2007.
2nd legs were played on 16–18 March 2007.

Team 1	Agg.	Team 2	1st leg	2nd leg
Highlanders (Zimbabwe)	0–2	(Egypt) Al Ahly SC	0–0	0–2
Desportivo Maputo (Mozambique)	1–3	(South Africa) Mamelodi Sundowns	1–1	0–2
Al-Hilal (Sudan)	4–2	(Egypt) El Zamalek	2–0	2–2
Nasarawa United (Nigeria)	4–2	(The Gambia) Gambia Ports Authority	3–0	1–2
Fello Star (Guinea)	1–5	(Tunisia) Étoile du Sahel	0–1	1–4
APR FC (Rwanda)	2–2	(Togo) Maranatha	2–0	0–2^{1}
Al-Ittihad (Libya)	5–1	(Niger) AS-FNIS	4–1	1–0
Saint-George SA (Ethiopia)	1–2	(Republic of the Congo) Étoile du Congo	1–0	0–2
Stade Malien (Mali)	1–3	(Morocco) Wydad AC	0–0	1–3
Kallon (Sierra Leone)	1–3	(Ivory Coast) ASEC Mimosas	0–1	1–2
Young Africans FC (Tanzania)	3–2	(Angola) Petro Atlético	3–0	0–2
Espérance (Tunisia)	6–1	(Zambia) Zanaco FC	2–0	4–1
Ashanti Gold SC (Ghana)	2–2 (6–7 p)	(Morocco) FAR Rabat	2–0	0–2
AS ADEMA (Madagascar)	3–5	(Democratic Republic of the Congo) TP Mazembe	2–2	1–4
AS Mangasport (Gabon)	3–4	(Algeria) JS Kabylie	3–1	0–3
Séwé Sports (Ivory Coast)	1–4	(Cameroon) Coton Sport FC	1–0	0–4

^{1} The match was abandoned at 82' with Maranatha leading 2-0, after APR FC walked off protesting a penalty award against them; APR FC were ejected from the competition and banned from CAF competitions for three years.

=== Second round ===
1st legs were played on 6–8 April 2007.
2nd legs were played on 20–22 April 2007.

Team 1	Agg.	Team 2	1st leg	2nd leg
Mamelodi Sundowns (South Africa)	2–4	(Egypt) Al Ahly SC	2–2	0–2
Nasarawa United (Nigeria)	3–3 (2–3 p)	(Sudan) Al-Hilal	3–0	0–3
Maranatha (Togo)	0–3	(Tunisia) Étoile du Sahel	0–0	0–3
Étoile du Congo (Republic of the Congo)	3–3 (a)	(Libya) Al-Ittihad	3–1	0–2
ASEC Mimosas (Ivory Coast)	2–0	(Morocco) Wydad AC	2–0	0–0
Espérance (Tunisia)	3–0	(Tanzania) Young Africans FC	3–0	0–0
TP Mazembe (Democratic Republic of the Congo)	1–2	(Morocco) FAR Rabat	1–0	0–2
Coton Sport FC (Cameroon)	1–2	(Algeria) JS Kabylie	1–0	0–2

== Group stage ==
Key to colours in group tables
Group winners and runners-up advance to the Knockout stage

=== Group A ===
Pos	Team	Pld	W	D	L	GF	GA	GD	Pts	Qualification	ESS	ITT	JSK	FAR
1	(Tunisia) Étoile du Sahel	6	3	2	1	6	2	+4	11	Advance to knockout stage	—	0–0	3–0	0–0
2	(Libya) Al-Ittihad	6	3	1	2	6	4	+2	10	Advance to knockout stage	2–0	—	1–0	2–0
3	(Algeria) JS Kabylie	6	2	1	3	6	8	−2	7		0–2	3–1	—	2–0
4	(Morocco) FAR Rabat	6	1	2	3	2	6	−4	5		0–1	1–0	1–1	—

Source: CAF
Rules for classification: Group stage tiebreakers

=== Group B ===
Pos	Team	Pld	W	D	L	GF	GA	GD	Pts	Qualification	AHL	HIL	ASE	EST
1	(Egypt) Al Ahly SC	6	4	0	2	8	4	+4	12	Advance to knockout stage	—	2–0	2–0	3–0
2	(Sudan) Al-Hilal	6	3	1	2	8	5	+3	10	Advance to knockout stage	3–0	—	2–1	2–0
3	(Ivory Coast) ASEC Mimosas	6	2	1	3	4	5	−1	7		0–1	1–0	—	2–0
4	(Tunisia) Espérance de Tunis	6	1	2	3	2	8	−6	5		1–0	1–1	0–0	—

Source: CAF
Rules for classification: Group stage tiebreakers

== Knockout stage ==
=== Bracket ===
Semi-finals
(Sudan)	Al-Hilal	2	1	3
(Tunisia)	Étoile du Sahel	1	3	4
(Libya)	Al-Ittihad	0	0	0
(Egypt)	Al Ahly	0	1	1

Final
(Tunisia)	Étoile du Sahel	0	3	3
(Egypt)	Al Ahly	0	1	1

=== Semi-finals ===
The first legs were played on 21–23 September and the second legs on 5–7 October.

Team 1	Agg.	Team 2	1st leg	2nd leg
Al Hilal (Sudan)	3–4	(Tunisia) Étoile du Sahel	2–1	1–3
Al-Ittihad (Libya)	0–1	(Egypt) Al Ahly SC	0–0	0–1

=== Final ===
27 October 2007
18:00 GMT

Étoile du Sahel (Tunisia)	0–0	(Egypt) Al Ahly SC

Stade Olympique de Sousse, Sousse
Attendance: 25,000
Referee: Evehe Divine (Cameroon)
9 November 2007
17:30 GMT

Al Ahly SC (Egypt)	1–3	(Tunisia) Étoile du Sahel
El-Nahhas 48'		Gharbi 44'; Chermiti 90+3'; Narry 90+5'

Cairo International Stadium, Cairo
Attendance: 74,000
Referee: Abderrahim El Arjoun (Morocco)

== Top goalscorers ==
The top scorers from the 2007 CAF Champions League are as follows:

Rank	Name	Team	Goals
1	(Democratic Republic of the Congo) Mabi Mputu	(Democratic Republic of the Congo) TP Mazembe	9
2	(Nigeria) Ndubuisi Eze	(Sudan) Al Hilal	8
2	(Tunisia) Amine Chermiti	(Tunisia) Étoile du Sahel	8
4	(Mali) Cheick Oumar Dabo	(Algeria) JS Kabylie	7
4	(Libya) Salem Al Rewani	(Libya) Al-Ittihad	7
6	(Tunisia) Amine Ltaïef	(Tunisia) Espérance de Tunis	6
7	(Angola) Flávio	(Egypt) Al-Ahly	5
7	(Libya) Younes Al Shibani	(Libya) Al-Ittihad	5
7	(Nigeria) Kelechi Osunwa	(Sudan) Al Hilal	5
10	(Egypt) Mohamed Aboutrika	(Egypt) Al-Ahly	4
10	(Morocco) Abdessamad Rafik	(Morocco) Wydad AC	4
10	(Venezuela) José Torrealba	(South Africa) Mamelodi Sundowns	4

== See also ==
- 2007 CAF Confederation Cup
- 2008 CAF Super Cup
- 2007 FIFA Club World Cup
