= Salem Ibrahim Al Rewani =

Libyan footballer (born 1977)

Salem Al Rewani
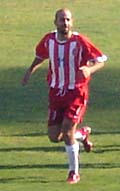

Personal information
- Full name: Salem Ibrahim Al Rewani
- Date of birth: February 28, 1977 (age 49)
- Place of birth: Al Khums, Libya
- Height: 1.78 m (5 ft 10 in)
- Positions: Striker; winger

Team information
- Current team: Al Madina
- Number: 11

Youth career
- Al Harati

Senior career*
Years	Team	Apps	(Gls)
1997–2000	Al Harati	?	(?)
2000–2004	Al Madina	?	(?)
2004–2009	Al-Ittihad	91	(45)
2009–2010	Al Nasr		
2010–2011	Al Madina		

International career
2004–2010	Libya	26	(4)
- * Club domestic league appearances and goals as of January 27, 2007

Salem Rewani (Arabic: سالم الرواني) (born February 28, 1977) is a Libyan former football striker who played for Al Madina, Al Nasr, Al-Ittihad and Al Khums. He also was a member of the Libya national football team.

== Honours ==
- Libyan Premier League 4
  - Al Madina 2001 and Al-Ittihad 2005, 2006, 2007
- Libyan Cup 2
  - Al-Ittihad 2005, 2007
- Libyan SuperCup 4
  - Al-Ittihad 2004, 2005, 2006, 2007
- Libyan top scorer in different African Club Competitions (13 goals).
  - CAF Champions League 2001 with Al Madina (2 goals)
  - CAF Confederation Cup 2005 with Al-Ittihad (4 goals)
  - CAF Champions League 2007 with Al-Ittihad (7 goals)
- 43rd in the World's Top Goal Scorer 2007
- Salem Rewani has Scored Amazing goal from 75 meters distance, in the CAF Champions League 2007 match against Mogas 90 of Benin.
