= Radhouène Felhi =

Tunisian footballer (born 1984)

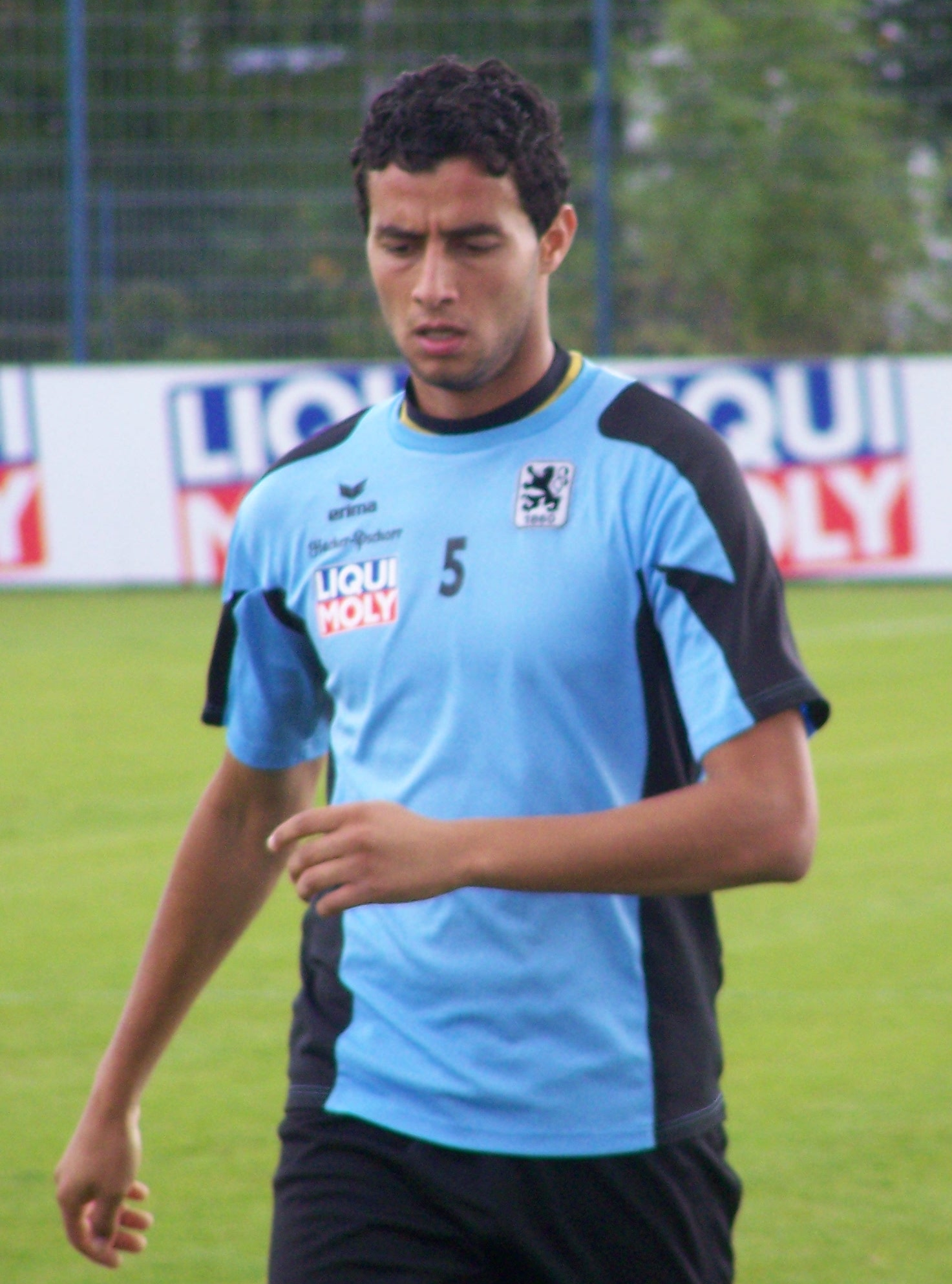
- Felhi with 1860 Munich in 2009

Personal information
- Date of birth: 25 March 1984 (age 42)
- Place of birth: Meknassy, Tunisia
- Height: 1.87 m (6 ft 2 in)
- Positions: Defender; defensive midfielder

Youth career
- –2005: SS Meknassi

Senior career*
Years	Team	Apps	(Gls)
2005–2014	Étoile du Sahel	123	(4)
2009–2010	→ 1860 Munich (loan)	26	(1)
2014–2015	Al-Salmiya		
2015–2016	Nejmeh	19	(2)

International career
2007–2013	Tunisia	20	(2)
- * Club domestic league appearances and goals

Radhouène Felhi (Arabic: رضوان الفالحي; born 25 March 1984) is a Tunisian former professional footballer who played as a defender or defensive midfielder. He has played for the Tunisia national team.

== Club career ==
Born in Meknassy, Felhi began his career with SS Meknassi, before joining Étoile Sportive du Sahel.

On 24 June 2009, he was loaned out to 2. Bundesliga club TSV 1860 Munich for one year.

On 6 October 2015, Felhi joined Lebanese Premier League side Nejmeh on a two-year contract. He helped his side win the 2015–16 Lebanese FA Cup after beating Ahed in the final on penalty shoot-outs.

== Honours ==
Étoile du Sahel

- Tunisian Ligue Professionnelle 1: 2006–07
- Tunisian Cup: 2011–12, 2013–14
- Tunisian Coupe de la Ligue: 2004–05
- CAF Champions League: 2007
- CAF Confederation Cup: 2006
- CAF Super Cup: 2008

Nejmeh

- Lebanese FA Cup: 2015–16
