= Ndubuisi Eze =

Nigerian football striker

Personal information
- Full name: Ndubuisi Godwin Ezeh
- Date of birth: May 10, 1984 (age 42)
- Place of birth: Lagos, Nigeria
- Height: 1.81 m (5 ft 11 in)
- Position: Striker

Youth career
- Team Lagos

Senior career*
Years	Team	Apps	(Gls)
2003 – 2006	Julius Berger F.C.	87	(38)
2006 – 2008	Al-Hilal	116	(55)
2008	Al-Ahli	7	(0)
2009	Nasr	15	(10)
2009	Yverdon-Sport FC	21	(10)
2010–2014	Ismaily	78	(34)
2015	Nejmeh SC		
- * Club domestic league appearances and goals

Ndubuisi Godwin Ezeh (born May 10, 1984 in Nigeria) is a former professional football striker.

== Career ==
Ezeh played an important role in Al-Hilal's successful run in the CAF Champions League 2007. He signed on 4 September 2010 a professional contract with Yverdon-Sport FC in Switzerland, here played only two games in the Swiss Challenge League and joined in January 2010 to Ismaily.
