= Fraj Bnouni =

Tunisian footballer

Personal information
- Full name: Fraj ben Abdallah Bnouni
- Date of birth: June 22, 1979 (age 47)
- Place of birth: Tunisia
- Height: 1.76 m (5 ft 9 1/2 in)
- Position: Midfielder

Senior career*
Years	Team	Apps	(Gls)
–2007	US Monastir	?	(5)
2007–2009	CS Sfaxien	?	(3)
2009–2010	Ahly Benghazi	7	(0)
2010–2012	US Monastir		
- * Club domestic league appearances and goals as of 23:06, 2 January 2010 (UTC)

Fraj ben Abdallah Bnouni (Arabic: فرج بن عبد الله البنوني) (born June 22, 1979) is a Tunisian footballer. His position is a midfielder. He measures 1.76 metres, and weighs 73 kilograms.

Bnouni moved to Libyan side Ahly Benghazi in summer of 2009, after spells with US Monastir and CS Sfaxien.
