= Mounir Benkassou =

Moroccan footballer (born 1976)

Personal information
- Full name: Mounir Benkassou
- Date of birth: 15 April 1976 (age 50)
- Place of birth: Rabat, Morocco
- Position: Midfielder

Youth career
- ?–1995: FAR Rabat

Senior career*
Years	Team	Apps	(Gls)
1995–2002	FAR Rabat		
2002–2004	CODM Meknes		
2004–2007	FAR Rabat		
2007–2009	Kawkab Marrakech	36	(3)
2009–2013	Olympique Safi	11	(0)
- * Club domestic league appearances and goals as of April 16, 2009 ‡ National team caps and goals as of October 17, 2008

Mounir Benkassou (born 15 April 1976) is a Moroccan footballer. He usually plays as midfielder.
