= Bassem Ben Nasser =

Tunisian footballer

Personal information
- Full name: Bassem Ben Nasser
- Date of birth: August 9, 1982 (age 44)
- Place of birth: Sousse, Tunisia
- Height: 1.80 m (5 ft 11 in)
- Position: Midfielder

Team information
- Current team: Étoile du Sahel
- Number: 26

Youth career
- 1993–2002: Jeunesse Sportive Kairouanaise

Senior career*
Years	Team	Apps	(Gls)
2002–2004	Jeunesse Sportive Kairouanaise	43	(11)
2004 – 2006	Étoile du Sahel	23	(4)
Jan – Jun 2007	Avenir Sportif de La Marsa	9	(3)
Jun 2007 – 20..	Étoile du Sahel	1	(0)

International career
- Tunisia U-21 and Tunisia senior team
- * Club domestic league appearances and goals as of June 1, 2007

Bassem Ben Nasser (born August 9, 1982 in Sousse) is a Tunisian footballer who plays as a midfielder. His clubs have included Étoile du Sahel, Club Athletique Bizertin, Jeunesse Sportive Kairouanaise and Avenir Sportif de La Marsa.
