= Afouène Gharbi =

Tunisian footballer and manager

Personal information
- Date of birth: 15 October 1980 (age 46)
- Place of birth: Béja, Tunisia
- Height: 1.75 m (5 ft 9 in)
- Position: Midfielder

Team information
- Current team: Hajer (manager)

Senior career*
Years	Team	Apps	(Gls)
2004–2006	Olympique Béja	60	(19)
2006–2009	ÉS Sahel	97	(32)
2010–2011	Shat	31	(20)

Managerial career
- 2011–2013: ÉS Sahel (assistant)
- 2015–2016: ES Hammam-Sousse
- 2016: CS M'saken
- 2016–2017: US Siliana
- 2017–2018: CO Médenine
- 2018: ES Métlaoui
- 2019: ES Métlaoui
- 2019–2020: Al-Nahda
- 2021: US Monastir
- 2021–2022: Najran
- 2023–2024: Neom
- 2024–: Hajer
- * Club domestic league appearances and goals

Afouène Gharbi (born 15 October 1980) is a Tunisian football manager and former player who manages Saudi Arabian club Hajer.

== Career ==
Gharbi has appeared for Étoile du Sahel in the CAF Champions League 2007, and he has scored once, against Maranatha FC on 21 April 2007. Gharbi signed a 6-month contract with Shat on 16 January 2010, agreeing to remain at the Zaawiyat-ad-Dahmani club until the end of the 2009–10 season.

After retiring he became a manager.

On 3 November 2021, Gharbi was appointed as manager of Najran.

On 29 June 2023, Gharbi was appointed as manager of Neom. He led them to the Second Division title and promotion to the First Division.

On 12 August 2024, Gharbi was appointed as manager of Hajer.
