= Saber Ben Frej =

Tunisian footballer

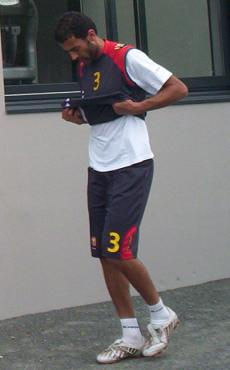

Personal information
- Date of birth: 3 July 1979 (age 47)
- Place of birth: Kerker, Mahdia, Tunisia
- Height: 1.86 m (6 ft 1 in)
- Position: Defender

Senior career*
Years	Team	Apps	(Gls)
2003–2007	Étoile du Sahel	33	(14)
2008–2009	Le Mans UC72	16	(0)
2010–2011	ES Hammam-Sousse	11	(1)

International career^{‡}
2004–2008	Tunisia	12	(1)
- * Club domestic league appearances and goals as of 10 October 2009 ‡ National team caps and goals as of 10 October 2009

Saber Ben Frej (born 3 July 1979) is a retired Tunisian footballer.

== Club career ==
During the first half of the 2007–08 season, Ben Frej scored nine goals in 13 games for Etoile du Sahel, before moving to Le Mans UC72 in January 2008. On 4 January 2010, his club have released the Tunisian defender, becoming a free agent.

== Career statistics ==
=== International ===
Scores and results list Tunisia's goal tally first, score column indicates score after each Ben Frej goal.

List of international goals scored by Saber Ben Frej
No.	Date	Venue	Opponent	Score	Result	Competition
1	11 October 2008	7 November Stadium, Radès, Tunisia	Seychelles	3–0	5–0	2010 FIFA World Cup qualification
