= Gilson Silva =

Cape Verdean association football player

Personal information
- Full name: Gilson Manuel Silva Alves
- Date of birth: 18 March 1987 (age 39)
- Place of birth: Fogo, Cape Verde
- Height: 1.80 m (5 ft 11 in)
- Positions: Winger; attacking midfielder

Youth career
- 1995–97: Batuque FC
- Rapid Bucharest
- Nadi Al-Jazirah

Senior career*
Years	Team	Apps	(Gls)
2004–2005	Batuque FC		
2005–2005	Botafogo FC, Fogo		
2005–2008	Étoile	67	(23)
2008–2009	EA Guingamp	39	(17)
2009–2010	Étoile	18	(2)
2010–2011	AD Ceuta	23	(11)
2012–2013	US Monastir	20	(9)
	Olympique du Kef	5	(0)
- CS Chebba
- Étoile

International career^{‡}
2008	Cape Verde	1	(0)
- * Club domestic league appearances and goals as of March 2014 ‡ National team caps and goals as of 1 July 2013

Gilson Manuel Silva Alves (born 18 March 1987 in Fogo), sometimes known as Ja, is a Cape Verdean football forward.

His first youth club was Batuque, he participated in two other clubs abroad, Rapid Bucharest and Nadi al-Jazira in the Emirates, likely the first Cape Verdean player to participate in the youth player. Gilson Silva appeared in the senior level and his first two clubs were of his nation, Batuque FC in the early part of the 2004–05 season and later Botafogo FC from Fogo. Gelson later played professional clubs in Tunisia including Étoile Sahel (played as of January 2014), US Monastir, Olympique de Kef and Sbiba. In between Étoile, outside Tunisia, he played with EA Guingamp, later he played with Ceuta in the Spanish Leagues.

Whilst at Guingamp, then in Ligue 2, Silva played in the 2009 Coupe de France Final in which they beat Rennes.

== International career ==
Silva has played for the senior Cape Verde national football team in a qualifying match for the 2010 FIFA World Cup.

== Personal life ==
He married Sandra in 2008 and raised their first child, a daughter in 2009.
