= Sousse Olympic Stadium =

Football stadium in Sousse, Tunisia

- Cemetery of the invaders
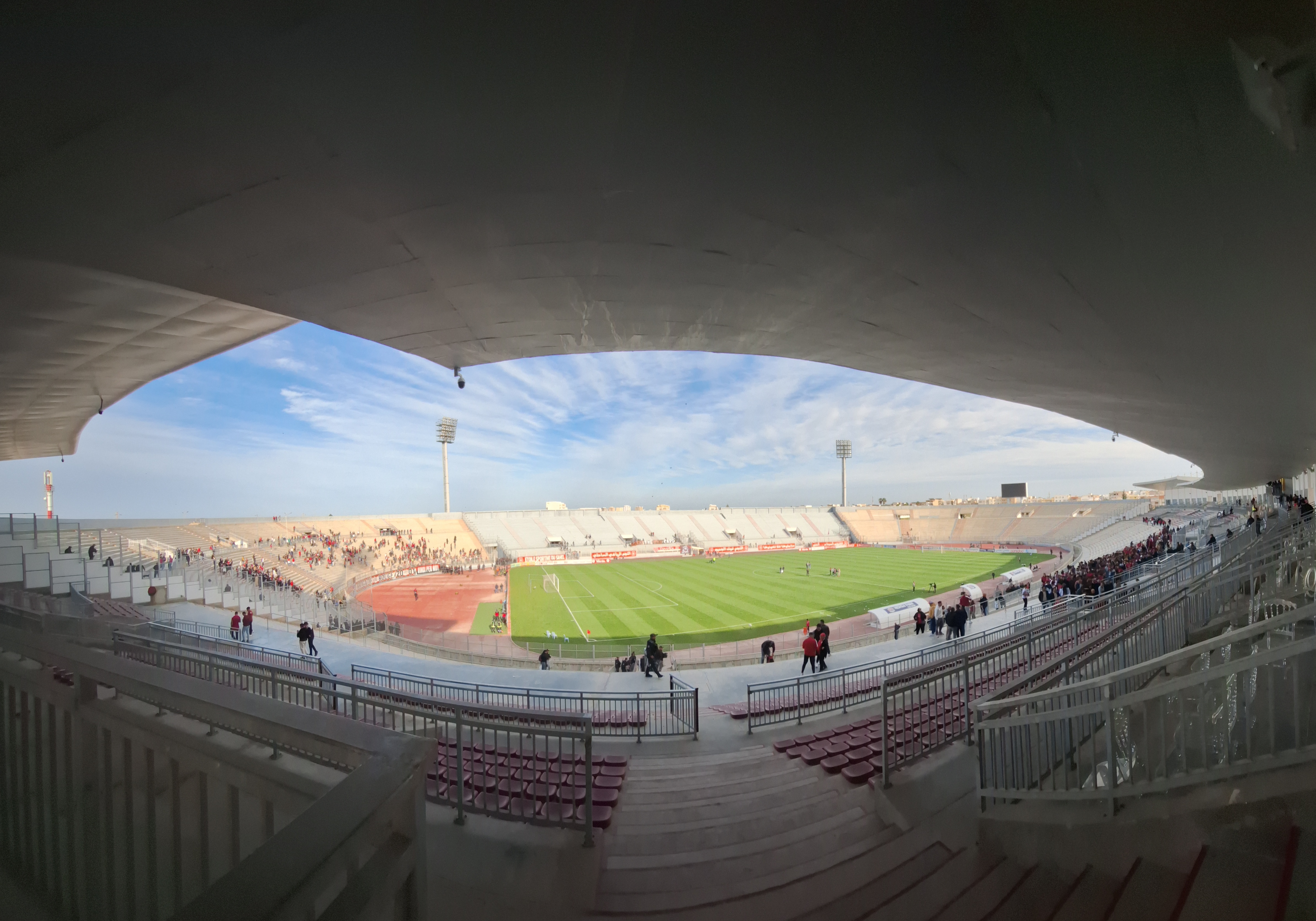
- The stadium in 2025
- Interactive map of Sousse Olympic Stadium
- Location: Sousse, Tunisia
- Coordinates: 35°49′24″N 10°36′46″E
- Owner: Government of Tunisia
- Capacity: 40,000
- Surface: Grass
- Field size: 105 m × 65 m

Construction
- Opened: 1973
- Renovated: 1994; 2019–2024
- Expanded: 1999; 2019–2022

Tenant
- Étoile du Sahel

The Sousse Olympic Stadium (Arabic: الملعب الأولمبي بسوسة) is a multi-purpose stadium in Sousse, Tunisia. It is used by the football team Étoile du Sahel, and was used for the 2004 African Cup of Nations. The stadium has a capacity of 40,000 after the most recent renovation works. It hosts within it the meetings played by the football team of the city: Étoile Sportive du Sahel (ESS).

It hosted 1977 FIFA U-20 World Cup, 1994 African Cup of Nations, 2001 Mediterranean Games and 2004 African Cup of Nations.

== History ==
For many decades, Sousse footballers knew only the clay surfaces and knew the turf surfaces only when the stadium was inaugurated with an initial capacity of 10,000 places. The last expansion was carried out in 1999 to bring the capacity of the stadium to 28,000 seats for the 2001 Mediterranean Games. The stadium has yet to be expanded to reach the capacity of 49,000 seats after the announcement the president of the club Moez Driss in 2008. The Olympic Stadium of Sousse also hosted some of the Libyan national team’s matches due to the Libyan war, such as Libya and Rwanda in the 2018 World Cup qualification.

== Renovation ==
In November 2017, on a visit to the President of the Republic, Beji Caid Essebsi, to Sousse, he gave an indication of the beginning of the expansion of the stadium and thus in March 2019, in order to be able to accommodate 40,000 spectators instead of 28,000. The cost of completing the total works was estimated at 32 million dinars, including 4 million dinars as a contribution from the Municipality of Sousse and 2 million dinars from the contribution of the team and coastal and is expected to include the expansion of the stadium, which will extend for 27 months.

== Tunisia national football team ==
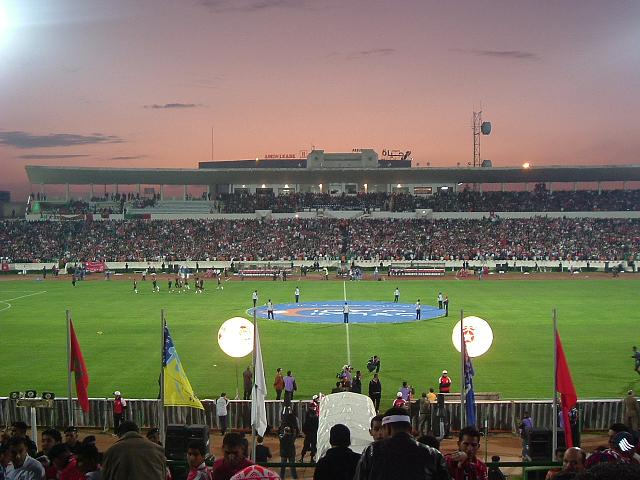
Interior view of the stadium.

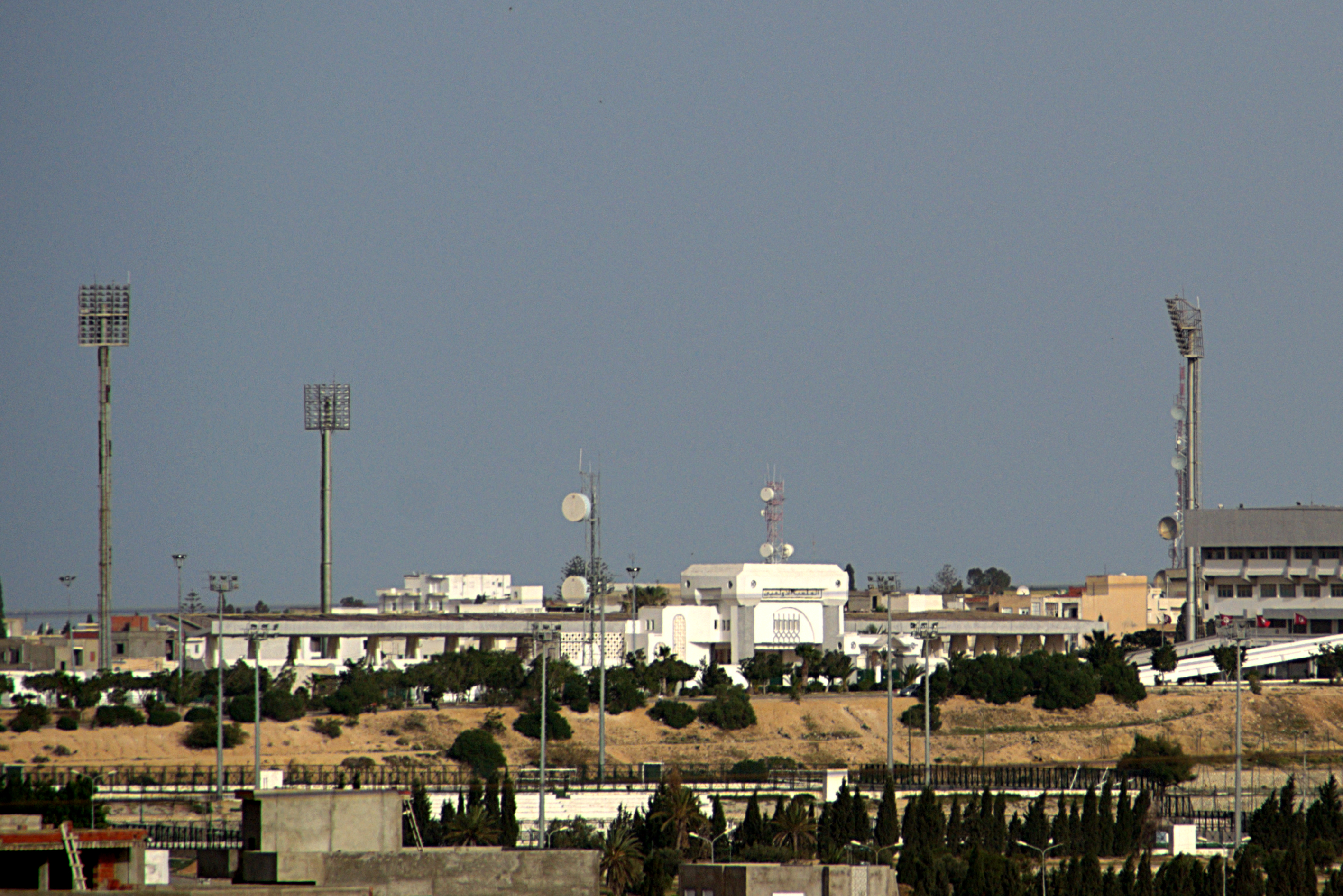
Exterior view of the stadium.

The following national team matches were held in the stadium.

#	Date	Score	Opponent	Competition
1.	23 March 1983	1–0	Morocco	Friendly
2.	2 January 1995	2–0	Egypt	Friendly
3.	6 October 1996	2–0	Sierra Leone	1998 Africa Cup of Nations qualification
4.	2 May 1998	1–1	Georgia	Friendly
5.	12 August 2009	0–0	Ivory Coast	Friendly
6.	29 May 2011	3–0	Central African Republic	Friendly
7.	3 June 2011	5–0	Chad	2012 Africa Cup of Nations qualification
8.	14 November 2012	1–2	Switzerland	Friendly
9.	6 July 2013	0–1	Morocco	2014 African Nations Championship qualification

== Major tournaments ==
=== 1977 FIFA U-20 World Cup ===
Stade Olympique de Sousse served as a venue for the tournament. It hosted all the matches of Group C. The games were:

Date	Time	Team #1	Res.	Team #2	Round
27 June 1977	12:00	Italy	1–1	Ivory Coast	Group C
27 June 1977	16:00	Brazil	5–1	Iran	Group C
30 June 1977	12:00	Iran	0–0	Italy	Group C
30 June 1977	16:00	Ivory Coast	1–1	Brazil	Group C
3 July 1977	12:00	Iran	3–0	Ivory Coast	Group C
3 July 1977	16:00	Brazil	2–0	Italy	Group C

=== 1994 Africa Cup of Nations ===
Stade Olympique de Sousse served as a venue for the tournament. It hosted six matches of the group stage, and two matches of quarter-finals. The games were:

Date	Team #1	Res.	Team #2	Round	Attendance
27 March 1994	Ivory Coast	4–0	Sierra Leone	Group C	10,000
27 March 1994	Ghana	1–0	Guinea	Group D	10,000
29 March 1994	Zambia	0–0	Sierra Leone	Group C	6,000
29 March 1994	Senegal	2–1	Guinea	Group D	6,000
31 March 1994	Zambia	1–0	Ivory Coast	Group C	6,000
31 March 1994	Ghana	1–0	Senegal	Group D	6,000
3 April 1994	Zambia	1–0	Senegal	Quarter-finals	8,000
3 April 1994	Ghana	1–2	Ivory Coast	Quarter-finals	8,000

=== 2001 Mediterranean Games ===
Stade Olympique de Sousse served as a venue for the tournament. It hosted all the matches of Group B. The games were:

Date	Team #1	Res.	Team #2	Round
5 September 2001	Greece	1–2	Turkey	Group B
9 September 2001	Turkey	1–1	Libya	Group B
11 September 2001	Greece	1–0	Libya	Group B

=== 2004 Africa Cup of Nations ===
Stade Olympique de Sousse served as a venue for the tournament. It hosted four matches of the group stage, and one match of semi-finals. The games were:

Date	Time	Team #1	Res.	Team #2	Round	Attendance
25 January 2004	19:00	Cameroon	1–1	Algeria	Group C	20,000
29 January 2004	19:00	Algeria	2–1	Egypt	Group C	15,000
3 February 2004	14:00	Algeria	1–2	Zimbabwe	Group C	10,000
4 February 2004	18:00	Morocco	1–1	South Africa	Group D	6,000
11 February 2004	19:00	Morocco	4–0	Mali	Semi-finals	15,000

=== 2026 FIFA World Cup qualification (CAF) ===
Stade Olympique de Sousse served as a neutral venue for the 2026 FIFA World Cup qualification match between São Tomé and Príncipe and Malawi in Group H :

Date	Time	Team #1	Res.	Team #2	Round	Attendance
13 October 2025	14:00	São Tomé and Príncipe	1–0	Malawi	Group H	–
