= Moussa Narry =

Footballer (born 1986)

Personal information
- Date of birth: 19 April 1986 (age 40)
- Place of birth: Maradi, Niger
- Height: 1.80 m (5 ft 11 in)
- Position: Defensive midfielder

Senior career*
Years	Team	Apps	(Gls)
2004–2006	Sahel SC		
2006–2008	Étoile du Sahel	57	(14)
2008–2010	Auxerre	33	(0)
2009	Auxerre B	5	(0)
2010	→ Le Mans (loan)	12	(0)
2010–2012	Le Mans	10	(4)
2012–2013	Al-Sharjah	6	(0)
2014–2015	Al-Orobah	8	(6)
2015–2016	Riffa SC		

International career
2007–2010	Ghana	6	(0)
- * Club domestic league appearances and goals

Moussa Narry (born Moses Narh on 19 April 1986) is a former professional footballer who played as a defensive midfielder. Born in Niger he made six appearances for the Ghana national team.

== Club career ==
Born in Maradi, Niger, Narry began his career with Sahel SC before joining Tunisian club Étoile Sportive du Sahel in 2006. After two years for Étoile du Sahel, during which he won the CAF Champions League with the side, he signed with AJ Auxerre in July 2008.

== International career ==
Narry was a surprise choice as a Ghanaian international because it had always been assumed he hailed from neighbouring Niger. However, investigations into his heritage revealed he was born to a Ghanaian family. On 18 November 2007, he made his senior international debut for Ghana in a 2–0 win against Togo and on 18 December 2007, Narry was called up by Ghana as part of the 40-man squad for training camp ahead of the 2008 Africa Cup of Nations. He also played at the 2010 Africa Cup of Nations. His only game was a 3–1 loss by Ivory Coast.
