= Amine Chermiti =

Tunisian footballer (born 1987)

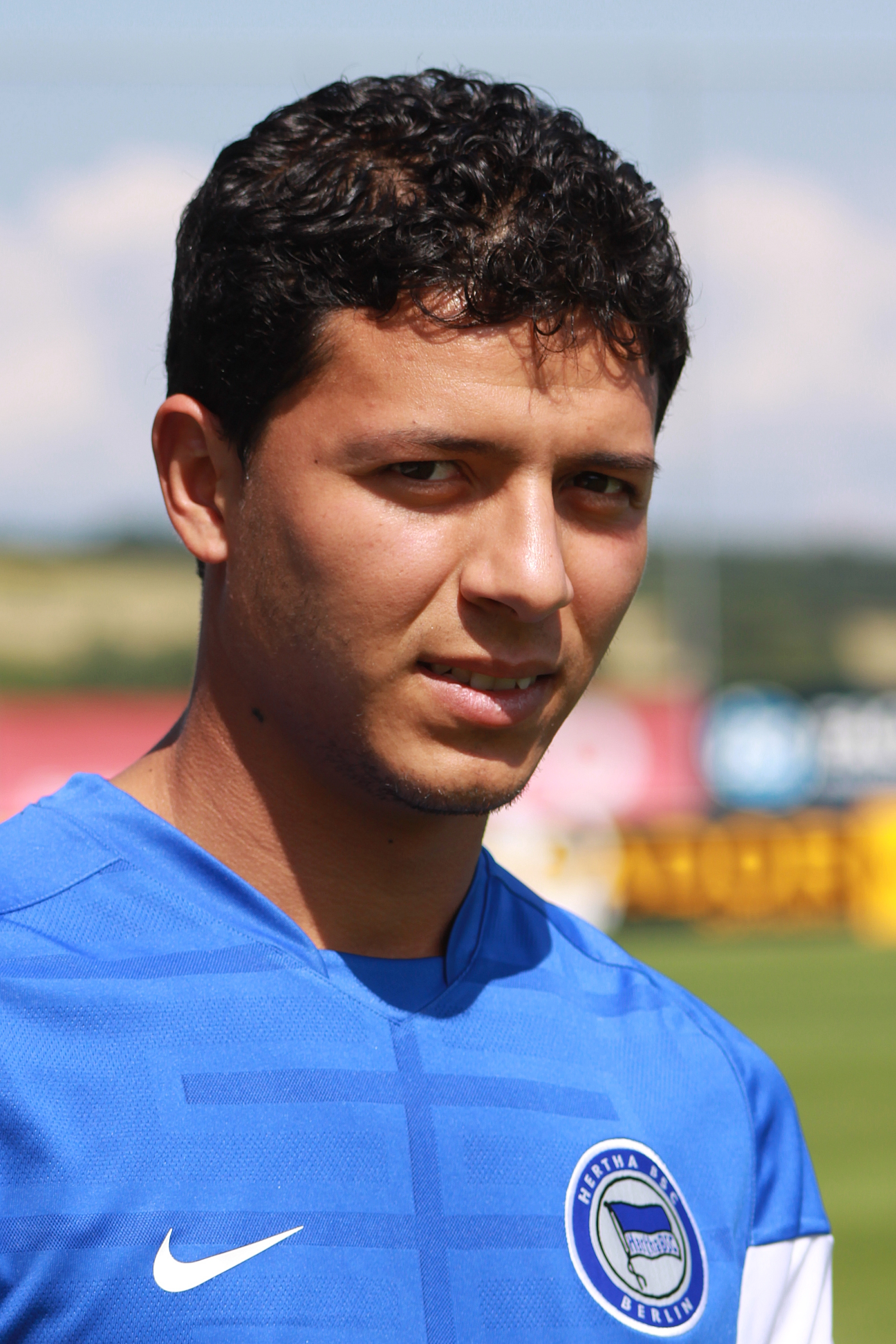
- Chermiti with Hertha BSC in 2009

Personal information
- Full name: Amine Chermiti
- Date of birth: 26 December 1987 (age 38)
- Place of birth: Sfax, Tunisia
- Height: 1.76 m (5 ft 9 in)
- Position: Striker

Youth career
- 2002–2005: JS Kairouan

Senior career*
Years	Team	Apps	(Gls)
2005–2006	Kairouan	10	(12)
2006–2008	Étoile Sahel	37	(20)
2008–2010	Hertha BSC	10	(0)
2009–2010	→ Ittihad Jeddah (loan)	14	(7)
2010–2015	FC Zürich	110	(30)
2016	Gazélec Ajaccio	9	(0)
2016–2017	Al Arabi	28	(16)
2017–2019	ES Sahel	30	(7)
2019	Al-Fayha	7	(0)
2019–2020	Mumbai City	16	(6)
Total		271	(98)

International career^{‡}
2005–2007	Tunisia U-21	10	(7)
2007–2015	Tunisia	39	(6)
- * Club domestic league appearances and goals as of 04:39, 4 October 2020 (UTC) ‡ National team caps and goals as of 26 November 2017

Mohamed Amine Chermiti (Arabic: أمين الشرميطي محمد; born 26 December 1987) is a Tunisian former professional footballer who played as a striker.

== Club career ==
Chermiti was mentioned as one of the African players of the year due to his performance in the African Champions League, where he scored eight goals in the tournament. He is credited for Étoile Sahel's superb performance in the CAF Champions League.

On 6 August 2008, he officially transferred to Hertha BSC and played his first match for them the following day in the first round of the German Cup. On 11 August 2009, Chermiti was loaned to Saudi Arabian top club Al-Ittihad for one year and returned on 30 June 2010.

On 5 July 2010, Chermiti signed a four-year contract with FC Zürich until summer 2014.

On 29 January 2016, Chermiti signed with Gazélec Ajaccio on a one-year contract, with an option for a further year.

He then signed for Saudi Arabian club Al-Fayha in January 2019, and played seven games in the season without scoring.

In August 2019, he signed for Indian Super League club Mumbai City FC. He started in their opening game, and scored the winning goal in a 1–0 victory against Kerala Blasters.

== International career ==
He was a member of the Tunisia national football team.

== Personal life ==
Chermiti's cousin Youssef Chermiti is a Portuguese professional footballer.

== Career statistics ==
Scores and results list Tunisia's goal tally first, score column indicates score after each Chermiti goal.

List of international goals scored by Amine Chermiti
No.	Date	Venue	Opponent	Score	Result	Competition
1	2 June 2007	Stade Olympique de Radès, Radès, Tunisia	Seychelles	4–0	4–0	2008 Africa Cup of Nations qualification
2	20 August 2008	Stade El Menzah, Tunis, Tunisia	Angola	1–0	1–1	Friendly
3	9 January 2010	Stade El Menzah, Tunis, Tunisia	Gambia	1–2	1–2	Friendly
4	21 January 2010	Estádio Nacional da Tundavala, Lubango, Angola	Cameroon	1–0	2–2	2010 Africa Cup of Nations
5	10 October 2010	Stade de Kégué, Lomé, Togo	Togo	2–1	2–1	2012 Africa Cup of Nations qualification
6	9 January 2012	Zayed Sports City Stadium, Abu Dhabi, United Arab Emirates	Sudan	3–0	3–0	Friendly
