= 2002 African Cup of Nations squads =

List of footballers

The 2002 African Cup of Nations squads is given as follows:

== Group A ==
=== Nigeria ===
Coach: (Nigeria) Shaibu Amodu

| No. | Pos. | Player | Date of birth (age) | Caps | Club |
|---|---|---|---|---|---|
| 1 | GK | Ike Shorunmu | 16 October 1967 (aged 34) | | (Switzerland) Luzern |
| 2 | DF | Joseph Yobo | 6 September 1980 (aged 21) | | (France) Marseille |
| 3 | DF | Celestine Babayaro | 29 August 1978 (aged 23) | | (England) Chelsea |
| 4 | FW | Nwankwo Kanu | 1 August 1976 (aged 25) | | (England) Arsenal |
| 5 | DF | Isaac Okoronkwo | 1 May 1978 (aged 23) | | (Ukraine) Shakhtar Donetsk |
| 6 | DF | Taribo West | 26 March 1974 (aged 27) | | (Germany) 1. FC Kaiserslautern |
| 7 | MF | Finidi George | 15 April 1971 (aged 30) | | (England) Ipswich Town |
| 8 | FW | Yakubu | 22 November 1982 (aged 19) | | (Israel) Maccabi Haifa |
| 9 | FW | Victor Agali | 12 December 1978 (aged 23) | | (Germany) Schalke 04 |
| 10 | MF | Jay-Jay Okocha | 14 August 1973 (aged 28) | | (France) Paris Saint-Germain |
| 11 | MF | Garba Lawal | 22 May 1974 (aged 27) | | (Netherlands) Roda JC |
| 12 | GK | Ndubuisi Egbo | 25 July 1973 (aged 28) | | (Albania) Tirana |
| 13 | FW | Tijani Babangida | 25 September 1973 (aged 28) | | (Netherlands) Vitesse |
| 14 | DF | Ifeanyi Udeze | 21 July 1980 (aged 21) | | (Greece) PAOK |
| 15 | MF | Sunday Oliseh | 14 April 1974 (aged 27) | | (Germany) Borussia Dortmund |
| 16 | MF | Wilson Oruma | 30 December 1976 (aged 25) | | (Switzerland) Servette |
| 17 | FW | Julius Aghahowa | 12 February 1982 (aged 19) | | (Ukraine) Shakhtar Donetsk |
| 18 | MF | Pascal Ojigwe | 11 December 1976 (aged 25) | | (Germany) Bayer Leverkusen |
| 19 | DF | Eric Ejiofor | 21 July 1979 (aged 22) | | (Nigeria) Enyimba International |
| 20 | FW | Victor Ikpeba | 12 June 1973 (aged 28) | | (Spain) Real Betis |
| 21 | MF | Justice Christopher | 24 December 1981 (aged 20) | | (Belgium) Royal Antwerp |
| 22 | GK | Murphy Akanji | 1 December 1977 (aged 24) | | (Malta) Sliema Wanderers |

=== Mali ===
Coach: (Poland) Henryk Kasperczak

| No. | Pos. | Player | Date of birth (age) | Caps | Club |
|---|---|---|---|---|---|
| 1 | GK | Mahamadou Sidibé | 8 August 1978 (aged 23) | | (Greece) Athinaikos |
| 2 | FW | Daouda Diakité | 20 March 1973 (aged 28) | | (Mali) Club Olympique |
| 3 | DF | Samba Diawara | 15 March 1978 (aged 23) | | (France) Istres |
| 4 | DF | Adama Coulibaly | 9 October 1980 (aged 21) | | (France) Lens |
| 5 | DF | Fousseni Diawara | 20 August 1980 (aged 21) | | (France) Saint-Étienne |
| 6 | MF | Mahamadou Diarra | 18 May 1981 (aged 20) | | (Netherlands) Vitesse |
| 7 | FW | Cheick Oumar Dabo | 12 January 1981 (aged 21) | | (Turkey) Gençlerbirliği |
| 8 | MF | Bassala Touré | 21 February 1976 (aged 25) | | (Greece) Athinaikos |
| 9 | FW | Mamadou Bagayoko | 21 May 1979 (aged 22) | | (France) Strasbourg |
| 10 | MF | Soumaila Coulibaly | 15 April 1978 (aged 23) | | (Germany) SC Freiburg |
| 11 | MF | Djibril Sidibé | 23 March 1982 (aged 19) | | (France) Monaco |
| 12 | MF | Seydou Keita | 16 January 1980 (aged 22) | | (France) Lorient |
| 13 | GK | Abdoulaye Camara | 2 January 1980 (aged 22) | | (Italy) Castel di Sangro |
| 14 | MF | Vincent Doukantié | 1 April 1977 (aged 24) | | (France) Strasbourg |
| 15 | DF | Boubacar Diarra | 15 July 1979 (aged 22) | | (Germany) SC Freiburg |
| 16 | GK | Karamoko Kéïta | 21 April 1974 (aged 27) | | (England) Harrow Borough |
| 17 | FW | Dramane Coulibaly | 18 March 1979 (aged 22) | | (France) Stade Lavallois |
| 18 | FW | Mahamadou Dissa | 18 May 1979 (aged 22) | | (France) Niort |
| 19 | MF | Adama Diakité | 4 July 1978 (aged 23) | | (Mali) Stade Malien |
| 20 | DF | Aboubacar Haïdar | 20 November 1977 (aged 24) | | (Egypt) Al-Ismaily |
| 21 | MF | David Coulibaly | 21 January 1978 (aged 23) | | (France) Châteauroux |
| 22 | DF | Abdoulaye Diakité | 13 January 1977 (aged 25) | | (Mali) Djoliba |

=== Liberia ===
Coach: (Liberia) Dominic George Vava

| No. | Pos. | Player | Date of birth (age) | Caps | Club |
|---|---|---|---|---|---|
| 1 | GK | Louis Crayton | 26 October 1977 (aged 24) | | (Switzerland) Young Fellows Juventus |
| 2 | DF | Fallah Johnson | 26 October 1976 (aged 25) | | (Liberia) LPRC Oilers |
| 3 | MF | Edward Dixon | 8 May 1974 (aged 27) | | (France) FA L'Île-Rousse Monticello |
| 4 | DF | Varmah Kpoto | 28 January 1978 (aged 23) | | (Greece) Apollon Krya Vrysi |
| 5 | DF | Dionysius Sebwe | 26 October 1976 (aged 25) | | (United States) Minnesota Thunder |
| 6 | MF | Kelvin Sebwe | 4 April 1972 (aged 29) | | (United Arab Emirates) Al Dhafra |
| 7 | FW | Frank Seator | 24 October 1975 (aged 26) | | (Qatar) Al Taawon |
| 8 | MF | Dulee Johnson | 7 November 1984 (aged 17) | | (Sweden) Häcken |
| 9 | FW | Zizi Roberts | 1 July 1979 (aged 22) | | (Greece) Olympiacos |
| 10 | FW | James Debbah | 14 December 1969 (aged 32) | | (United Arab Emirates) Al-Jazira |
| 11 | MF | Mass Sarr Jr | 14 December 1969 (aged 32) | | (Malaysia) Selangor |
| 12 | MF | Oliver Makor | 9 October 1973 (aged 28) | | (Greece) Ionikos |
| 13 | MF | Alex Brown | 16 April 1978 (aged 23) | | (Oman) Al-Ahli Sedab |
| 14 | FW | George Weah | 1 October 1966 (aged 35) | | (United Arab Emirates) Al-Jazira |
| 15 | FW | Prince Daye | 11 April 1978 (aged 23) | | (France) Bastia |
| 16 | GK | Abraham Jackson | 12 February 1972 (aged 29) | | (France) Feurs |
| 17 | DF | George Gebro | 13 September 1981 (aged 20) | | (Greece) Patraikos |
| 18 | FW | Josephus Yenay | 5 September 1975 (aged 26) | | (Germany) Eintracht Trier |
| 19 | MF | Johnny Menyongar | 26 June 1979 (aged 22) | | (United States) Minnesota Thunder |
| 20 | DF | Jimmy Dixon | 10 October 1981 (aged 20) | | (Sweden) Häcken |
| 21 | DF | Thomas Kojo | 22 May 1972 (aged 29) | | (United States) Minnesota Thunder |
| 22 | GK | Pewou Bestman | 10 July 1975 (aged 26) | | (India) Kochin |

=== Algeria ===
Coach: (Algeria) Rabah Madjer

| No. | Pos. | Player | Date of birth (age) | Caps | Club |
|---|---|---|---|---|---|
| 1 | GK | Lounès Gaouaoui | 28 September 1977 (aged 24) | | (Algeria) JS Kabylie |
| 2 | DF | Yacine Slatni | 3 November 1973 (aged 28) | | (Algeria) MC Alger |
| 3 | DF | Moulay Haddou | 14 June 1975 (aged 26) | | (Algeria) MC Oran |
| 4 | MF | Nasreddine Kraouche | 27 August 1979 (aged 22) | | (Belgium) K.A.A. Gent |
| 5 | DF | Mounir Zeghdoud | 18 January 1970 (aged 32) | | (Algeria) USM Alger |
| 6 | MF | Yazid Mansouri | 25 February 1978 (aged 23) | | (France) Le Havre AC |
| 7 | MF | Omar Belbey | 7 October 1973 (aged 28) | | (France) Montpellier HSC |
| 8 | MF | Billel Dziri | 21 January 1972 (aged 29) | | (Algeria) USM Alger |
| 9 | FW | Farid Ghazi | 16 March 1974 (aged 27) | | (United Arab Emirates) Baniyas SC |
| 10 | FW | Abdelhafid Tasfaout (c) | 11 February 1969 (aged 32) | | (France) EA Guingamp |
| 11 | FW | Kamel Kherkhache | 21 March 1973 (aged 28) | | (Algeria) USM Blida |
| 12 | GK | Mohamed Samadi | 7 July 1976 (aged 25) | | (Algeria) USM Blida |
| 13 | DF | Brahim Zafour | 30 November 1977 (aged 24) | | (Algeria) JS Kabylie |
| 14 | FW | Nassim Bounekdja | 23 October 1976 (aged 25) | | (Algeria) CR Belouizdad |
| 15 | FW | Nassim Akrour | 10 July 1974 (aged 27) | | (France) FC Istres |
| 16 | MF | Lounès Bendahmane | 3 April 1977 (aged 24) | | (Algeria) JS Kabylie |
| 17 | DF | Slimane Rahou | 20 October 1975 (aged 26) | | (Algeria) JS Kabylie |
| 18 | FW | Rafik Saïfi | 7 February 1975 (aged 26) | | (France) Troyes AC |
| 19 | DF | Smail Diss | 2 December 1976 (aged 25) | | (Algeria) USM Blida |
| 20 | MF | Mahieddine Meftah | 25 September 1968 (aged 33) | | (Algeria) USM Alger |
| 21 | DF | Mohamed Bradja | 16 November 1969 (aged 32) | | (France) Troyes AC |
| 22 | GK | Merouane Abdouni | 27 March 1981 (aged 20) | | (Algeria) USM El Harrach |

== Group B ==
=== South Africa ===
Coach: (Portugal) Carlos Queiroz

| No. | Pos. | Player | Date of birth (age) | Caps | Club |
|---|---|---|---|---|---|
| 1 | GK | Hans Vonk | 30 January 1970 (aged 31) | | (Netherlands) Heerenveen |
| 2 | DF | Mbulelo Mabizela | 16 September 1980 (aged 21) | | (South Africa) Orlando Pirates |
| 3 | DF | Bradley Carnell | 21 January 1977 (aged 24) | | (Germany) VfB Stuttgart |
| 4 | DF | David Kannemeyer | 8 July 1977 (aged 24) | | (South Africa) Ajax Cape Town |
| 5 | DF | Matthew Booth | 14 March 1977 (aged 24) | | (South Africa) Mamelodi Sundowns |
| 6 | MF | McBeth Sibaya | 25 November 1977 (aged 24) | | (South Africa) Jomo Cosmos |
| 7 | MF | Quinton Fortune | 21 May 1977 (aged 24) | | (England) Manchester United |
| 8 | MF | Thabo Mngomeni | 24 June 1969 (aged 32) | | (South Africa) Orlando Pirates |
| 9 | FW | Shaun Bartlett | 31 October 1972 (aged 29) | | (England) Charlton Athletic |
| 10 | MF | Bennett Mnguni | 18 March 1974 (aged 27) | | (South Africa) Mamelodi Sundowns |
| 11 | FW | Bradley August | 24 September 1978 (aged 23) | | (South Africa) Santos Cape Town |
| 12 | MF | Dillon Sheppard | 27 February 1979 (aged 22) | | (South Africa) Ajax Cape Town |
| 13 | DF | Pierre Issa | 12 September 1975 (aged 26) | | (England) Watford |
| 14 | FW | Siyabonga Nomvethe | 2 December 1977 (aged 24) | | (Italy) Udinese |
| 15 | MF | Sibusiso Zuma | 6 August 1979 (aged 22) | | (South Africa) Kaizer Chiefs |
| 16 | GK | Brian Baloyi | 16 March 1974 (aged 28) | | (South Africa) Kaizer Chiefs |
| 17 | FW | Benni McCarthy | 12 November 1977 (aged 24) | | (Portugal) Porto |
| 18 | MF | Delron Buckley | 7 December 1977 (aged 24) | | (Germany) VfL Bochum |
| 19 | DF | Aaron Mokoena | 25 November 1980 (aged 21) | | (Belgium) Germinal Beerschot |
| 20 | DF | Frank Schoeman | 30 July 1975 (aged 26) | | (South Africa) Mamelodi Sundowns |
| 21 | MF | Eric Tinkler | 30 July 1970 (aged 31) | | (England) Barnsley FC |
| 22 | GK | Andre Arendse | 27 June 1967 (aged 34) | | (South Africa) Santos Cape Town |

=== Ghana ===
Coach: (Ghana) Fred Osam Duodu

| No. | Pos. | Player | Date of birth (age) | Caps | Club |
|---|---|---|---|---|---|
| 1 | GK | James Nanor | 12 August 1979 (aged 22) | | (Ghana) Hearts of Oak |
| 2 | MF | Hamza Mohammed | 5 November 1980 (aged 21) | | (Ghana) Real Tamale United |
| 3 | MF | Emmanuel Kuffour | 3 September 1976 (aged 25) | | (Ghana) Hearts of Oak |
| 4 | DF | Samuel Kuffour | 3 September 1976 (aged 25) | | (Germany) FC Bayern Munich |
| 5 | DF | John Mensah | 29 November 1982 (aged 19) | | (Italy) Genoa |
| 6 | DF | Yaw Amankwah Mireku | 25 November 1979 (aged 22) | | (Ghana) Hearts of Oak |
| 7 | FW | Matthew Amoah | 24 October 1980 (aged 21) | | (Netherlands) Vitesse Arnhem |
| 8 | MF | Michael Essien | 3 December 1982 (aged 19) | | (France) SC Bastia |
| 9 | MF | Prince Amoako | 29 November 1973 (aged 28) | | (Russia) FC Saturn |
| 10 | MF | Derek Boateng | 2 May 1983 (aged 18) | | (Greece) Panathinaikos |
| 11 | FW | Alex Tachie-Mensah | 15 February 1977 (aged 24) | | (Switzerland) Neuchâtel Xamax |
| 12 | GK | Sammy Adjei | 1 September 1980 (aged 21) | | (Ghana) Hearts of Oak |
| 13 | FW | Isaac Boakye | 26 November 1982 (aged 19) | | (Ghana) Goldfields Obuasi |
| 14 | DF | George Blay | 7 August 1980 (aged 21) | | (Belgium) Standard Liège |
| 15 | MF | Princeton Owusu-Ansah | 15 February 1977 (aged 24) | | (Switzerland) Neuchâtel Xamax |
| 16 | MF | Emmanuel Duah | 14 November 1976 (aged 25) | | (Portugal) U.D. Leiria |
| 17 | FW | Baffour Gyan | 2 July 1980 (aged 21) | | (Czech Republic) Slovan Liberec |
| 18 | FW | Ishmael Addo | 30 December 1982 (aged 19) | | (Ghana) Hearts of Oak |
| 19 | DF | Koffi Amponsah | 23 April 1978 (aged 23) | | (Greece) PAOK |
| 20 | MF | Abdul Razak Ibrahim | 18 April 1983 (aged 18) | | (Italy) Empoli FC |
| 21 | DF | John Paintsil | 15 June 1981 (aged 20) | | (Ghana) Berekum Arsenal |
| 22 | GK | Abubakari Kankani | 25 December 1976 (aged 25) | | (Ghana) Ghapoha |

=== Morocco ===
Coach: (Portugal) Humberto Coelho

| No. | Pos. | Player | Date of birth (age) | Caps | Club |
|---|---|---|---|---|---|
| 1 | GK | Abdelilah Bagui | 17 February 1978 (aged 23) | | (Morocco) Maghreb Fez |
| 2 | MF | Rachid Benmahmoud | 14 September 1979 (aged 22) | | (United Arab Emirates) Al-Ahli |
| 3 | DF | Akram Roumani | 1 April 1978 (aged 23) | | (Belgium) RC Genk |
| 4 | DF | Abdeslam Ouaddou | 1 November 1978 (aged 23) | | (England) Fulham F.C. |
| 5 | DF | Abdelilah Fahmi | 3 August 1973 (aged 28) | | (France) Lille OSC |
| 6 | DF | Noureddine Naybet | 10 February 1970 (aged 31) | | (Spain) Deportivo de La Coruña |
| 7 | MF | Rabil Lafoui | 30 June 1976 (aged 25) | | (Morocco) Wydad Casablanca |
| 8 | DF | Faouzi El Brazi | 22 May 1977 (aged 24) | | (Netherlands) FC Twente |
| 9 | FW | Abdeljalil Hadda | 21 March 1972 (aged 29) | | (Tunisia) Club Africain |
| 10 | MF | Adil Ramzi | 14 July 1977 (aged 24) | | (Netherlands) PSV Eindhoven |
| 11 | FW | Hicham Zerouali | 17 January 1977 (aged 25) | | (Scotland) Aberdeen F.C. |
| 12 | MF | Nourdin Boukhari | 13 June 1980 (aged 21) | | (Netherlands) Sparta Rotterdam |
| 13 | MF | Otmane El Assas | 30 January 1979 (aged 22) | | (Morocco) OC Khouribga |
| 14 | FW | Salaheddine Bassir | 5 September 1972 (aged 29) | | (France) Lille OSC |
| 15 | MF | Youssef Safri | 13 January 1977 (aged 25) | | (England) Coventry City |
| 16 | GK | Tarik El Jarmouni | 30 December 1977 (aged 24) | | (Morocco) Wydad Casablanca |
| 17 | MF | Gharib Amzine | 3 May 1973 (aged 28) | | (France) Troyes AC |
| 18 | MF | Youssef Chippo | 10 May 1973 (aged 28) | | (England) Coventry City |
| 19 | MF | Tarik Chihab | 22 November 1975 (aged 26) | | (Switzerland) FC Zurich |
| 20 | FW | Rachid Rokki | 8 November 1971 (aged 30) | | (Qatar) Al Taawon |
| 21 | DF | Badr El Kaddouri | 31 January 1981 (aged 20) | | (Morocco) Wydad Casablanca |
| 22 | GK | Driss Benzekri | 31 December 1970 (aged 31) | | (Morocco) RS Settat |

=== Burkina Faso ===
Coach: (Burkina Faso) Jacques Yameogo & (Burkina Faso) Pihouri Weboanga

| No. | Pos. | Player | Date of birth (age) | Caps | Club |
|---|---|---|---|---|---|
| 1 | GK | Issoufou Sawadogo | 17 June 1975 (aged 26) | | (Burkina Faso) Etoile Filante |
| 2 | DF | Lamine Traoré | 10 June 1982 (aged 19) | | (Belgium) RSC Anderlecht |
| 3 | DF | Brahima Cisse | 10 February 1976 (aged 25) | | (Burkina Faso) USFA |
| 4 | MF | Mamadou Tall | 4 December 1982 (aged 19) | | (Turkey) Bursaspor |
| 5 | MF | Madou Dossama | 24 July 1972 (aged 29) | | (Burkina Faso) Etoile Filante |
| 6 | MF | Madi Saidou Panandétiguini | 22 March 1984 (aged 17) | | (France) Bordeaux |
| 7 | FW | Alassane Ouedraogo | 7 September 1980 (aged 21) | | (Germany) 1. FC Köln |
| 8 | FW | Issa Zongo | 27 July 1980 (aged 21) | | (Guinea) Satellite FC |
| 9 | FW | Oumar Barro | 3 June 1974 (aged 27) | | (Denmark) Brøndby IF |
| 10 | FW | Ali Ouedraogo | 31 December 1976 (aged 25) | | (Burkina Faso) Etoile Filante |
| 11 | FW | Wilfried Sanou | 16 March 1984 (aged 17) | | (Germany) SC Freiburg |
| 12 | DF | Soumaila Tassembedo | 27 November 1983 (aged 18) | | (Burkina Faso) Etoile Filante |
| 13 | MF | Bèbè Kambou | 1 July 1982 (aged 19) | | (France) CS Louhans-Cuiseaux |
| 14 | FW | Tanguy Barro | 13 September 1982 (aged 19) | | (Burkina Faso) RC Bobo Dioulasso |
| 15 | DF | Ousmane Traore | 7 March 1977 (aged 24) | | (France) AS Valence |
| 16 | GK | Abdul Kader Kontougonde | 21 February 1984 (aged 17) | | (Burkina Faso) USFA |
| 17 | MF | Narcisse Yameogo | 19 November 1980 (aged 21) | | (Senegal) ASC Jeanne d'Arc |
| 18 | MF | Amadou Touré | 23 December 1979 (aged 22) | | (Burkina Faso) ASFA Yennega |
| 19 | FW | Moumouni Dagano | 3 January 1981 (aged 21) | | (Belgium) KRC Genk |
| 20 | DF | Boureima Ouattara | 13 January 1984 (aged 18) | | (Burkina Faso) ASFB |
| 21 | DF | Firmin Sanou | 21 April 1973 (aged 28) | | (France) AS Valence |
| 22 | GK | Mohamed Kabore | 31 December 1980 (aged 21) | | (Burkina Faso) ASFA Yennega |

== Group C ==
=== Cameroon ===
Coach: (Germany) Winfried Schäfer

| No. | Pos. | Player | Date of birth (age) | Caps | Club |
|---|---|---|---|---|---|
| 1 | GK | Alioum Boukar | 3 January 1972 (aged 30) | | (Turkey) Samsunspor |
| 2 | DF | Bill Tchato | 15 May 1975 (aged 26) | | (France) Montpellier |
| 3 | DF | Pierre Wome | 23 March 1979 (aged 22) | | (Italy) Bologna |
| 4 | DF | Rigobert Song | 1 July 1976 (aged 25) | | (Germany) 1. FC Köln |
| 5 | DF | Raymond Kalla | 22 April 1975 (aged 26) | | (Spain) Extremadura |
| 6 | DF | Jean Dika Dika | 4 June 1979 (aged 22) | | (Portugal) União Lamas |
| 7 | MF | Joseph N'Do | 28 April 1976 (aged 25) | | (Saudi Arabia) Al-Khaleej |
| 8 | MF | Geremi Njitap | 20 December 1978 (aged 23) | | (Spain) Real Madrid |
| 9 | FW | Samuel Eto'o | 10 March 1981 (aged 20) | | (Spain) Mallorca |
| 10 | FW | Patrick M'Boma | 15 November 1970 (aged 31) | | (Italy) Parma |
| 11 | FW | Pius N'Diefi | 5 July 1975 (aged 26) | | (France) Sedan |
| 12 | DF | Lauren | 19 January 1977 (aged 25) | | (England) Arsenal |
| 13 | DF | Lucien Mettomo | 19 April 1977 (aged 24) | | (England) Manchester City |
| 14 | MF | Joël Epalle | 20 February 1978 (aged 23) | | (Greece) Panachaiki |
| 15 | MF | Nicolas Alnoudji | 9 December 1979 (aged 22) | | (Turkey) Rizespor |
| 16 | GK | Jacques Songo'o | 17 May 1964 (aged 37) | | (France) Metz |
| 17 | MF | Marc-Vivien Foé | 1 May 1975 (aged 26) | | (France) Olympique Lyonnais |
| 18 | FW | Patrick Suffo | 17 January 1978 (aged 24) | | (England) Sheffield United |
| 19 | MF | Eric Djemba-Djemba | 4 May 1981 (aged 20) | | (France) Nantes |
| 20 | MF | Salomon Olembé | 8 December 1980 (aged 21) | | (France) Olympique de Marseille |
| 21 | MF | Daniel N'Gom Kome | 19 May 1980 (aged 21) | | (Spain) Numancia |
| 22 | GK | Carlos Kameni | 18 February 1984 (aged 17) | | (France) Le Havre |

=== DR Congo ===
Coach: (Democratic Republic of the Congo) Louis Watunda

| No. | Pos. | Player | Date of birth (age) | Caps | Club |
|---|---|---|---|---|---|
| 1 | GK | Pascal Kalemba | 26 February 1979 (aged 22) | | (Democratic Republic of the Congo) TP Mazembe |
| 2 | DF | Kayemba Muyaya | 22 February 1979 (aged 22) | | (Democratic Republic of the Congo) Daring Club Motema Pembe |
| 3 | DF | Bijou Kisombe Mundaba | 29 September 1976 (aged 25) | | (Angola) Inter de Luanda |
| 4 | DF | Yves Yuvuladio | 4 March 1978 (aged 23) | | (Turkey) Erzurumspor |
| 5 | DF | Esele Bakasu | 13 March 1975 (aged 26) | | (Germany) SC Paderborn 07 |
| 6 | FW | Jason Mayélé | 4 January 1976 (aged 26) | | (Italy) Chievo Verona |
| 7 | FW | Pathy Nsele Essengo | 13 August 1979 (aged 22) | | (Angola) Inter de Luanda |
| 8 | MF | Mbiyavanga Kapela | 12 February 1976 (aged 25) | | (Angola) Petro Atlético |
| 9 | FW | Lomana LuaLua | 28 December 1980 (aged 21) | | (England) Newcastle United |
| 10 | FW | Kanku Mulekelayi | 1 April 1979 (aged 22) | | (Democratic Republic of the Congo) TP Mazembe |
| 11 | MF | Papi Kimoto | 22 July 1976 (aged 25) | | (Belgium) K.S.C. Lokeren Oost-Vlaanderen |
| 12 | GK | Paulin Tokala Kombe | 26 March 1977 (aged 24) | | (Angola) Inter de Luanda |
| 13 | MF | Dikilu Bageta | 24 March 1981 (aged 20) | | (Democratic Republic of the Congo) TP Mazembe |
| 14 | MF | Jean-Paul Boeka Lisasi | 4 September 1977 (aged 24) | | (Belgium) K.R.C. Mechelen |
| 15 | MF | Belux Bukasa Kasongo | 13 August 1979 (aged 22) | | (Democratic Republic of the Congo) AS Vita Club |
| 16 | MF | Patrick Kifu Apataki | 14 May 1979 (aged 22) | | (Belgium) K.S.C. Lokeren Oost-Vlaanderen |
| 17 | MF | Pierre Manzamgala | 1 August 1981 (aged 20) | | (Belgium) K.S.C. Lokeren Oost-Vlaanderen |
| 18 | FW | Shabani Nonda | 6 March 1977 (aged 24) | | (France) AS Monaco |
| 19 | MF | Marcel Mbayo | 24 April 1978 (aged 23) | | (Turkey) Gençlerbirliği |
| 20 | DF | Félix Mwamba Musasa | 25 December 1976 (aged 25) | | (Democratic Republic of the Congo) TP Mazembe |
| 21 | FW | Alexis Tekumu | 20 July 1982 (aged 19) | | (Switzerland) Servette |
| 22 | GK | Michel Babale | 12 March 1975 (aged 26) | | (South Africa) Free State Stars |

=== Togo ===
Coach: (Togo) Bana Tchanilé

| No. | Pos. | Player | Date of birth (age) | Caps | Club |
|---|---|---|---|---|---|
| 1 | GK | Ouro-Nimini Tchagnirou | 31 December 1977 (aged 24) | | (Togo) Semassi |
| 2 | DF | Abdoul-Gafar Mamah | 24 August 1985 (aged 16) | | (Togo) Gomido |
| 3 | MF | Yao Mawuko Sènaya | 18 October 1979 (aged 22) | | (Switzerland) Etoile Carouge |
| 4 | DF | Jean-Paul Abalo | 26 June 1975 (aged 26) | | (France) Amiens |
| 5 | DF | Massamasso Tchangai | 8 August 1978 (aged 23) | | (Italy) Viterbese |
| 6 | FW | Emmanuel Adebayor | 26 February 1984 (aged 17) | | (France) Metz |
| 7 | MF | Thomas Dossevi | 6 March 1979 (aged 22) | | (France) Châteauroux |
| 8 | MF | Lantame Ouadja | 28 August 1977 (aged 24) | | (Switzerland) Etoile Carouge |
| 9 | FW | Kossi Noutsoudje | 16 October 1977 (aged 24) | | (Ivory Coast) ASEC Abidjan |
| 10 | MF | Adékambi Olufadé | 7 January 1980 (aged 22) | | (France) Lille |
| 11 | FW | Mickaël Dogbé | 28 November 1976 (aged 25) | | (France) Grenoble |
| 12 | DF | Eric Akoto | 20 July 1980 (aged 21) | | (Austria) Sturm Graz |
| 13 | MF | Komlan Assignon | 20 January 1974 (aged 27) | | (France) Créteil |
| 14 | DF | Koffi Olympio | 18 April 1975 (aged 26) | | (France) Moulins |
| 15 | FW | Abdou Moumouni | 19 November 1982 (aged 19) | | (Switzerland) SR Delémont |
| 16 | GK | Kossi Agassa | 2 July 1978 (aged 23) | | (Ivory Coast) Africa Sports |
| 17 | FW | Mohamed Kader | 8 April 1979 (aged 22) | | (Italy) Parma |
| 18 | DF | Atayi Amavi Agbobli | 25 December 1975 (aged 26) | | (Togo) OC Agaza |
| 19 | MF | Moustapha Salifou | 1 August 1976 (aged 25) | | (Togo) Modèle Lomé |
| 20 | FW | Djima Oyawolé | 18 October 1976 (aged 25) | | (Belgium) K.A.A. Gent |
| 21 | DF | Zanzan Atte-Oudeyi | 2 September 1980 (aged 21) | | (Niger) JS du Ténéré |
| 22 | GK | Safiou Salifou | 11 August 1982 (aged 19) | | (Togo) ASKO Kara |

=== Ivory Coast ===
Coach: (Ivory Coast) Lama Bamba

| No. | Pos. | Player | Date of birth (age) | Caps | Club |
|---|---|---|---|---|---|
| 1 | GK | Losseni Konaté | 29 December 1972 (aged 29) | | (Ivory Coast) ASEC Mimosas |
| 2 | DF | Kolo Touré | 19 March 1981 (aged 20) | | (Ivory Coast) ASEC Mimosas |
| 3 | DF | Mamadou Coulibaly | 26 May 1980 (aged 21) | | (Belgium) Lokeren |
| 4 | MF | Lassina Diabaté | 16 September 1974 (aged 27) | | (France) Auxerre |
| 5 | DF | Ghislain Akassou | 15 February 1975 (aged 26) | | (Italy) Pistoiese |
| 6 | DF | Blaise Kouassi | 2 February 1974 (aged 27) | | (France) Guincamp |
| 7 | MF | Tchiressoua Guel | 27 December 1975 (aged 26) | | (France) Lorient |
| 8 | MF | Ibrahima Koné | 26 July 1969 (aged 32) | | (Tunisia) Étoile du Sahel |
| 9 | FW | Kandia Traoré | 5 July 1980 (aged 21) | | (Tunisia) Esperance de Tunis |
| 10 | FW | Ibrahima Bakayoko | 31 December 1976 (aged 25) | | (France) Olympique de Marseille |
| 11 | DF | Seydou Badjan Kanté | 7 August 1981 (aged 20) | | (Ivory Coast) ASEC Mimosas |
| 12 | MF | Abdul Kader Keïta | 6 August 1981 (aged 20) | | (United Arab Emirates) Al Ain |
| 13 | MF | Aliou Siby Badra | 26 February 1971 (aged 30) | | (Tunisia) Club Africain |
| 14 | FW | Aruna Dindane | 26 November 1980 (aged 21) | | (Belgium) RSC Anderlecht |
| 15 | MF | Bonaventure Kalou | 12 January 1978 (aged 24) | | (Netherlands) Feyenoord |
| 16 | GK | Boubacar Barry | 30 December 1979 (aged 22) | | (France) Stade Rennais |
| 17 | MF | Gilles Yapi Yapo | 30 January 1982 (aged 19) | | (Ivory Coast) ASEC Mimosas |
| 18 | MF | Abdoulaye Djiré | 28 February 1981 (aged 20) | | (Ivory Coast) ASEC Mimosas |
| 19 | MF | Didier Zokora | 14 December 1980 (aged 21) | | (Belgium) KRC Genk |
| 20 | MF | Siaka Tiéné | 22 February 1982 (aged 19) | | (Ivory Coast) ASEC Mimosas |
| 21 | FW | Zéphirin Zoko | 13 September 1977 (aged 24) | | (France) Paris FC |
| 22 | GK | Bernard Kouakou | 1 January 1980 (aged 22) | | (Ivory Coast) Jeunesse Club Abidjan |

== Group D ==
=== Senegal ===
Coach: (France) Bruno Metsu

| No. | Pos. | Player | Date of birth (age) | Caps | Club |
|---|---|---|---|---|---|
| 1 | GK | Tony Sylva | 17 May 1975 (aged 26) | | (France) AS Monaco |
| 2 | DF | Omar Daf | 12 February 1977 (aged 24) | | (France) Sochaux |
| 3 | MF | Pape Sarr | 7 December 1977 (aged 24) | | (France) Lens |
| 4 | DF | Pape Malick Diop | 29 December 1974 (aged 27) | | (Switzerland) Neuchâtel Xamax |
| 5 | DF | Alassane N'Dour | 12 December 1981 (aged 20) | | (France) Saint-Étienne |
| 6 | DF | Aliou Cissé | 24 March 1976 (aged 25) | | (France) Montpellier |
| 7 | FW | Henri Camara | 10 May 1977 (aged 24) | | (France) Sedan |
| 8 | FW | Amara Traoré | 25 September 1965 (aged 36) | | (France) Gueugnon |
| 9 | FW | Souleymane Camara | 22 December 1982 (aged 19) | | (France) AS Monaco |
| 10 | MF | Khalilou Fadiga | 30 December 1974 (aged 27) | | (France) Auxerre |
| 11 | FW | El Hadji Diouf | 15 January 1981 (aged 21) | | (France) Lens |
| 12 | MF | Amady Faye | 12 March 1977 (aged 24) | | (France) Auxerre |
| 13 | DF | Lamine Diatta | 2 July 1975 (aged 26) | | (France) Rennes |
| 14 | MF | Moussa N'Diaye | 20 February 1979 (aged 22) | | (France) Sedan |
| 15 | MF | Salif Diao | 10 February 1977 (aged 24) | | (France) Sedan |
| 16 | GK | Omar Diallo | 28 September 1972 (aged 29) | | (Morocco) Olympique Khouribga |
| 17 | DF | Ferdinand Coly | 10 September 1973 (aged 28) | | (France) Lens |
| 18 | FW | Pape Thiaw | 5 February 1981 (aged 20) | | (Switzerland) Lausanne Sports |
| 19 | MF | Papa Bouba Diop | 28 January 1978 (aged 23) | | (France) Lens |
| 20 | MF | Sylvain N'Diaye | 25 June 1976 (aged 25) | | (France) Lille |
| 21 | DF | Habib Beye | 19 October 1977 (aged 24) | | (France) Strasbourg |
| 22 | MF | Makhtar N'Diaye | 31 December 1981 (aged 20) | | (France) Rennes |

=== Egypt ===
Coach: (Egypt) Mahmoud Al Gohary

| No. | Pos. | Player | Date of birth (age) | Caps | Club |
|---|---|---|---|---|---|
| 1 | GK | Nader El-Sayed | 31 December 1972 (aged 29) | | (Egypt) Goldi |
| 2 | DF | Amr Fahim | 4 October 1976 (aged 25) | | (Egypt) Al-Ismaily |
| 3 | DF | Mohamed Emara | 10 June 1974 (aged 27) | | (Germany) Hansa Rostock |
| 4 | DF | Hany Ramzy | 10 March 1969 (aged 32) | | (Germany) Kaiserslautern |
| 5 | DF | Abdel-Zaher El-Saqua | 30 January 1974 (aged 27) | | (Turkey) Gençlerbirliği |
| 6 | MF | Hany Said | 22 April 1980 (aged 21) | | (Italy) Bari |
| 7 | FW | Khaled Bebo | 6 October 1976 (aged 25) | | (Egypt) Al Ahly |
| 8 | DF | Yasser Radwan | 22 October 1972 (aged 29) | | (Germany) Hansa Rostock |
| 9 | FW | Hossam Hassan | 10 August 1966 (aged 35) | | (Egypt) El Zamalek |
| 10 | FW | Gamal Hamza | 5 December 1981 (aged 20) | | (Egypt) El Zamalek |
| 11 | MF | Tarek El-Said | 5 April 1978 (aged 23) | | (Belgium) RSC Anderlecht |
| 12 | MF | Mohamed Barakat | 20 November 1976 (aged 25) | | (Egypt) Al-Ismaily |
| 13 | DF | Wael Gomaa | 3 August 1975 (aged 26) | | (Egypt) Al Ahly |
| 14 | MF | Hazem Emam | 10 May 1975 (aged 26) | | (Egypt) El Zamalek |
| 15 | DF | Ibrahim Said | 16 September 1979 (aged 22) | | (Egypt) Al Ahly |
| 16 | GK | Essam El-Hadary | 15 January 1973 (aged 29) | | (Egypt) Al Ahly |
| 17 | MF | Ahmed Hassan | 2 May 1975 (aged 26) | | (Turkey) Gençlerbirliği |
| 18 | FW | Ahmed Hossam ("Mido") | 23 February 1983 (aged 18) | | (Netherlands) Ajax |
| 19 | FW | Ahmed Salah Hosny | 11 July 1979 (aged 22) | | (Belgium) K.A.A. Gent |
| 20 | MF | Mohamed Aboul Ela | 4 January 1981 (aged 21) | | (Egypt) El Zamalek |
| 21 | DF | Tarek El-Sayed | 9 October 1978 (aged 23) | | (Egypt) El Zamalek |
| 22 | GK | Mohamed Abdel Monsef | 6 February 1977 (aged 24) | | (Egypt) El Zamalek |

=== Tunisia ===
Coach: (France) Henri Michel

| No. | Pos. | Player | Date of birth (age) | Caps | Club |
|---|---|---|---|---|---|
| 1 | GK | Chokri El Ouaer | 15 August 1966 (aged 35) | | (Tunisia) Espérance |
| 2 | DF | Khaled Badra | 8 April 1973 (aged 28) | | (Italy) Genoa |
| 3 | MF | Zoubeir Baya | 15 May 1971 (aged 30) | | (Turkey) Beşiktaş |
| 4 | DF | Mounir Boukadida | 24 October 1967 (aged 34) | | (Germany) Waldhof Mannheim |
| 5 | MF | Mehdi Nafti | 28 November 1978 (aged 23) | | (Spain) Racing Santander |
| 6 | DF | Hatem Trabelsi | 25 January 1977 (aged 24) | | (Netherlands) Ajax |
| 7 | MF | Imed Mhedhebi | 22 March 1976 (aged 25) | | (Italy) Genoa |
| 8 | MF | Hassen Gabsi | 23 February 1974 (aged 27) | | (Italy) Genoa |
| 9 | FW | Jamel Zabi | 19 June 1975 (aged 26) | | (Tunisia) CA Bizertin |
| 10 | MF | Kaies Ghodhbane | 7 January 1976 (aged 26) | | (Tunisia) ES Sahel |
| 11 | MF | Anis Boujelbene | 6 February 1978 (aged 23) | | (Tunisia) CS Sfaxien |
| 12 | DF | Raouf Bouzaiene | 16 August 1970 (aged 31) | | (Italy) Genoa |
| 13 | MF | Riadh Bouazizi | 8 April 1973 (aged 28) | | (Turkey) Bursaspor |
| 14 | DF | Hamdi Marzouki | 23 January 1977 (aged 24) | | (Tunisia) Club Africain |
| 15 | DF | Radhi Jaïdi | 30 August 1975 (aged 26) | | (Tunisia) Espérance |
| 16 | GK | Hassen Bejaoui | 14 February 1976 (aged 25) | | (Tunisia) CA Bizertin |
| 17 | DF | Walid Azaiez | 25 April 1976 (aged 25) | | (Tunisia) Espérance |
| 18 | MF | Selim Ben Achour | 8 September 1981 (aged 20) | | (France) Martigues |
| 19 | DF | Emir Mkademi | 20 August 1978 (aged 23) | | (Tunisia) ES Sahel |
| 20 | MF | Mourad Melki | 9 May 1975 (aged 26) | | (Tunisia) Espérance |
| 21 | FW | Bessam Daassi | 13 September 1980 (aged 21) | | (Tunisia) Stade Tunisien |
| 22 | GK | Ahmed Jaouachi | 13 July 1975 (aged 26) | | (Tunisia) ES Sahel |

=== Zambia ===
Coach: (Denmark) Roald Poulsen

| No. | Pos. | Player | Date of birth (age) | Caps | Club |
|---|---|---|---|---|---|
| 1 | GK | Davies Phiri | 1 April 1976 (aged 25) | | (Zambia) Kabwe Warriors |
| 2 | DF | Laughter Chilembi | 25 November 1975 (aged 26) | | (Zambia) Nchanga Rangers |
| 3 | DF | Charles Bwale | 29 July 1976 (aged 25) | | (Zambia) Nkana Red Devils |
| 4 | DF | Moses Sichone | 31 May 1977 (aged 24) | | (Germany) 1. FC Köln |
| 5 | DF | Elija Tana | 28 February 1975 (aged 26) | | (Zambia) Nchanga Rangers |
| 6 | DF | Jones Mwewa | 12 March 1973 (aged 28) | | (Zambia) Power Dynamos |
| 7 | MF | Mark Sinyangwe | 29 December 1975 (aged 26) | | (Zambia) Nkana Red Devils |
| 8 | MF | Charles Lota | 17 November 1978 (aged 23) | | (Zambia) Kabwe Warriors |
| 9 | FW | Cosmas Banda | 29 December 1975 (aged 26) | | (Zambia) Zanaco FC |
| 10 | FW | Dennis Lota | 8 December 1973 (aged 28) | | (South Africa) Orlando Pirates |
| 11 | FW | Harry Milanzi | 13 March 1978 (aged 23) | | (Mexico) Atlético Zamora |
| 12 | MF | Boston Mwanza | 3 December 1978 (aged 23) | | (Zambia) Nkana Red Devils |
| 13 | MF | Mumamba Numba | 21 March 1978 (aged 23) | | (Zambia) Zanaco FC |
| 14 | MF | Francis Kasonde | 1 September 1986 (aged 15) | | (Zambia) Kabwe Warriors |
| 15 | MF | Ian Bakala | 1 November 1980 (aged 21) | | (Zambia) Kabwe Warriors |
| 16 | GK | Collins Mbulo | 15 January 1970 (aged 32) | | (Zambia) Green Buffaloes |
| 17 | MF | Gift Kampamba | 1 January 1979 (aged 23) | | (South Africa) Mamelodi Sundowns |
| 18 | FW | Chaswe Nsofwa | 22 October 1980 (aged 21) | | (Zambia) Zanaco FC |
| 19 | MF | Andrew Sinkala | 18 June 1979 (aged 22) | | (Germany) 1. FC Köln |
| 20 | FW | Phillimon Chipeta | 2 January 1981 (aged 21) | | (Zambia) Lusaka Dynamos |
| 21 | DF | Hillary Makasa | 12 January 1976 (aged 26) | | (South Africa) Ria Stars |
| 22 | MF | Misheck Lungu | 2 May 1980 (aged 21) | | (Zambia) Nchanga Rangers |
