= 2006 CAF Champions League final =

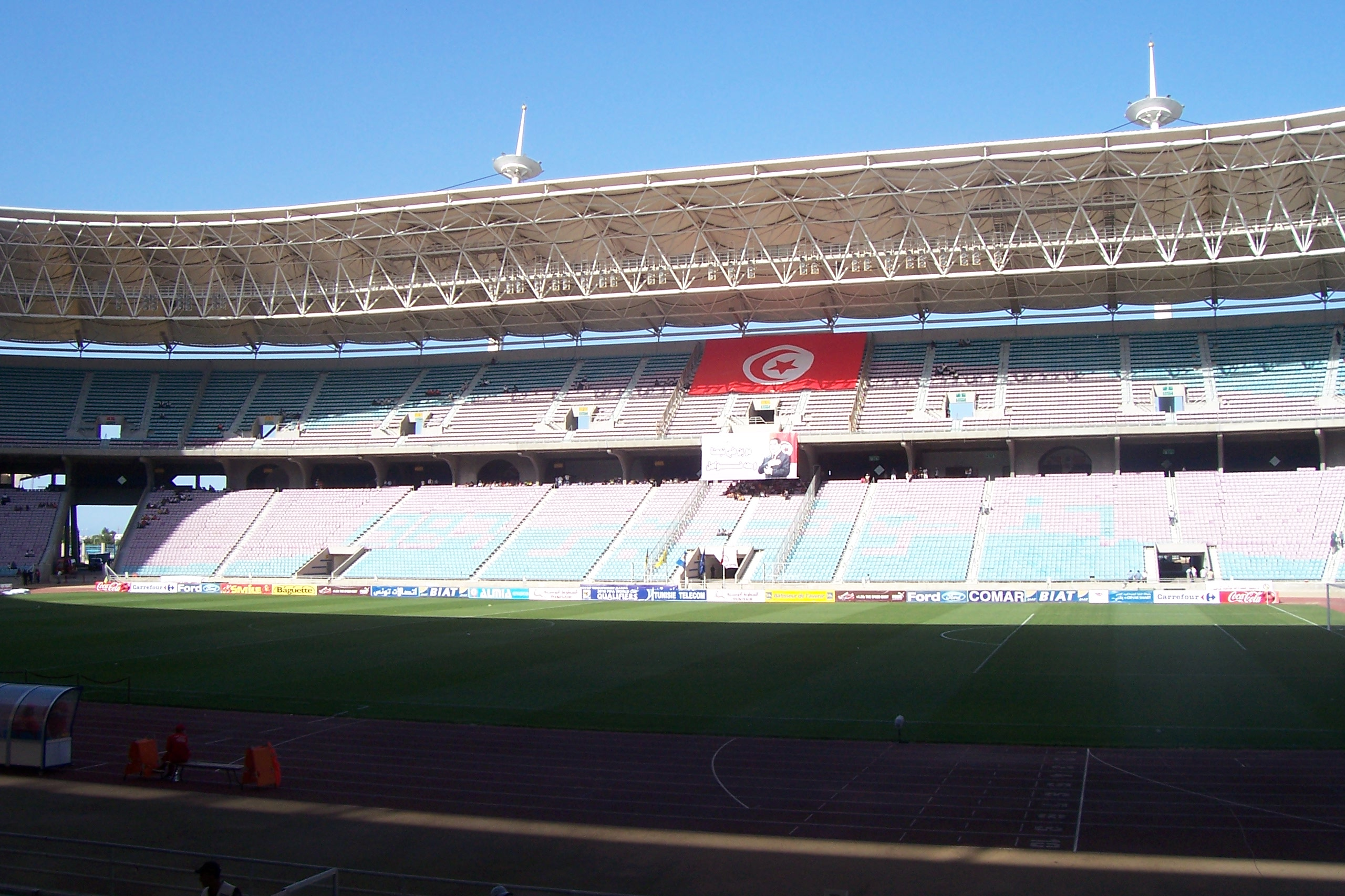
- 7 November Stadium hosted the podium where Al Ahly lifted the trophy
- Event: 2006 CAF Champions League
Al-Ahly	CS Sfaxien
(Egypt)	(Tunisia)
2	1
- on aggregate

First leg
Al-Ahly	CS Sfaxien
1	1
- Date: 29 October 2006
- Venue: Cairo International Stadium, Cairo
- Referee: Modou Sowe (Gambia)
- Attendance: 74,000

Second leg
CS Sfaxien	Al-Ahly
0	1
- Date: 11 November 2006
- Venue: Stade 7 November, Tunis
- Referee: Coffi Codjia (Benin)
- Attendance: 60,000

The 2006 CAF Champions League final was a football tie held over two legs in December 2006. Al-Ahly of Egypt beat CS Sfaxien of Tunisia 2-1.

== Qualified teams ==
In the following table, finals until 1996 were in the African Cup of Champions Club era, since 1997 were in the CAF Champions League era.

Team	Region	Previous finals appearances (bold indicates winners)
(Egypt) Al Ahly	UNAF (North Africa)	**1982**, 1983, **1987**, **2001**, **2005**
(Tunisia) CS Sfaxien	UNAF (North Africa)	none

== Background ==
Al-Ahly were the defending champions after winning the compatriot of CS Sfaxien, Étoile du Sahel 3–0, reaching a total of five finals, winning four (1982, 1987, 2001, 2005) and losing one (1983) while CS Sfaxien reached the final for the first time ever. Both teams met in the Group stage, with each victorious in their home matches - CS Sfaxien winning 1–0, while Al Ahly won 2–1. Both teams qualified for the semifinals on the second-last matchday. In the semifinals CS Sfaxien defeated Orlando Pirates 1–0 on aggregate, winning the second leg at home by that score, with the first leg ending in a scoreless draw. Al Ahly faced ASEC Mimosas from Ivory Coast and won the first leg 2–0 at home. In the second leg, Al Ahly lost 1–2 but reached the final.

== Venues ==
=== Cairo International Stadium ===
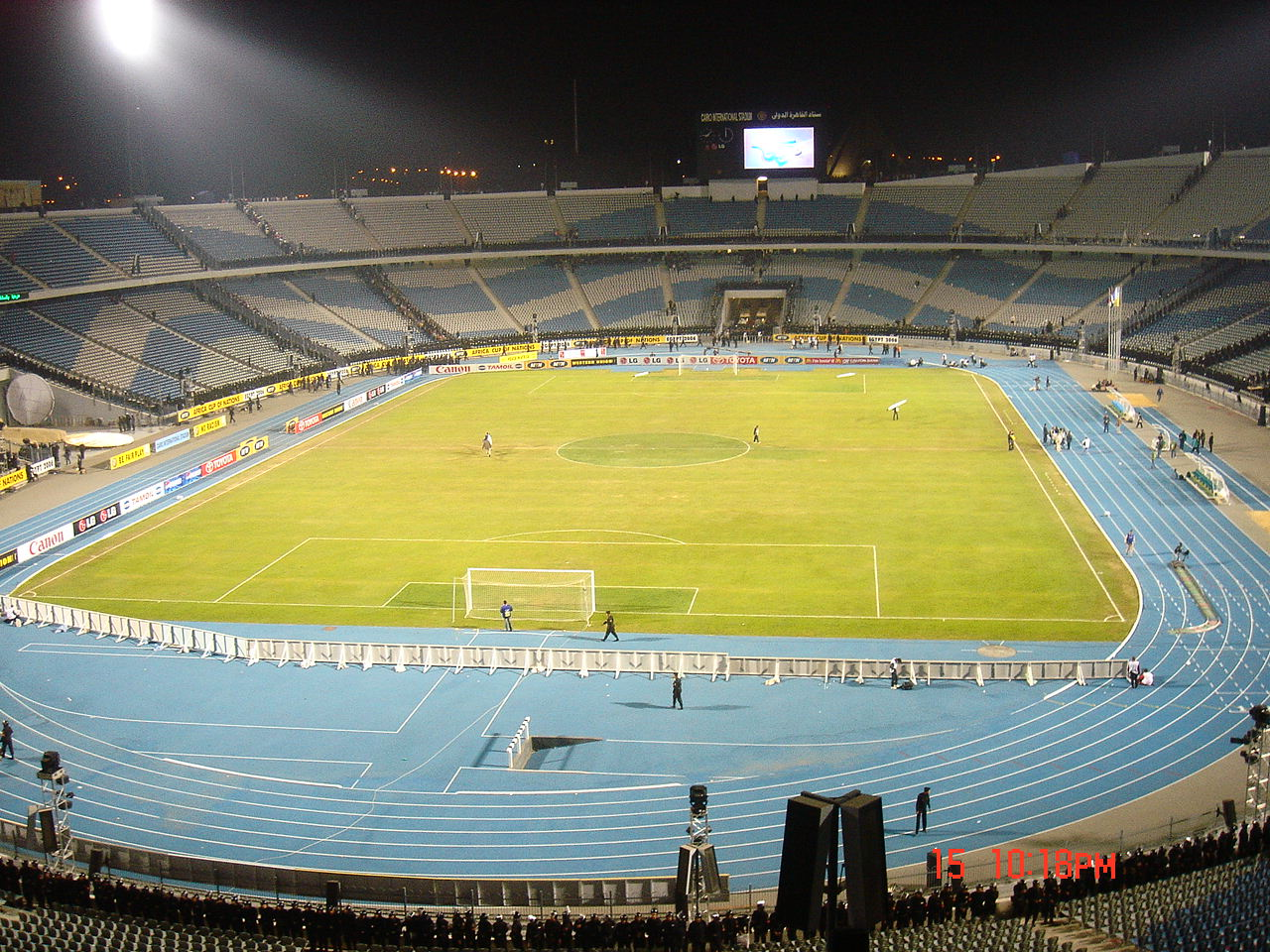
International Stadium in Cairo, Egypt hosted the first leg.

Cairo International Stadium, formerly known as Nasser Stadium, is an Olympic-standard, multi-use stadium with an all-seated capacity of 75,000. The architect of the stadium is the German Werner March, who had built from 1934 to 1936 the Olympic Stadium in Berlin. Before becoming an all seater stadium, it had the ability to hold over 100,000 spectators, reaching a record of 120,000. It is the foremost Olympic-standard facility befitting the role of Cairo, Egypt as the center of events in the region. It is also the 69th largest stadium in the world. Located in Nasr City; a suburb north east of Cairo, it was completed in 1960, and was inaugurated by President Gamal Abd El Nasser on 23 July that year, the eighth anniversary of the Egyptian Revolution of 1952. Zamalek SC currently use the Petro Sport Stadium for most of their home games and Al Ahly use Al Salam Stadium for most of their home games.

=== 7 November Stadium ===
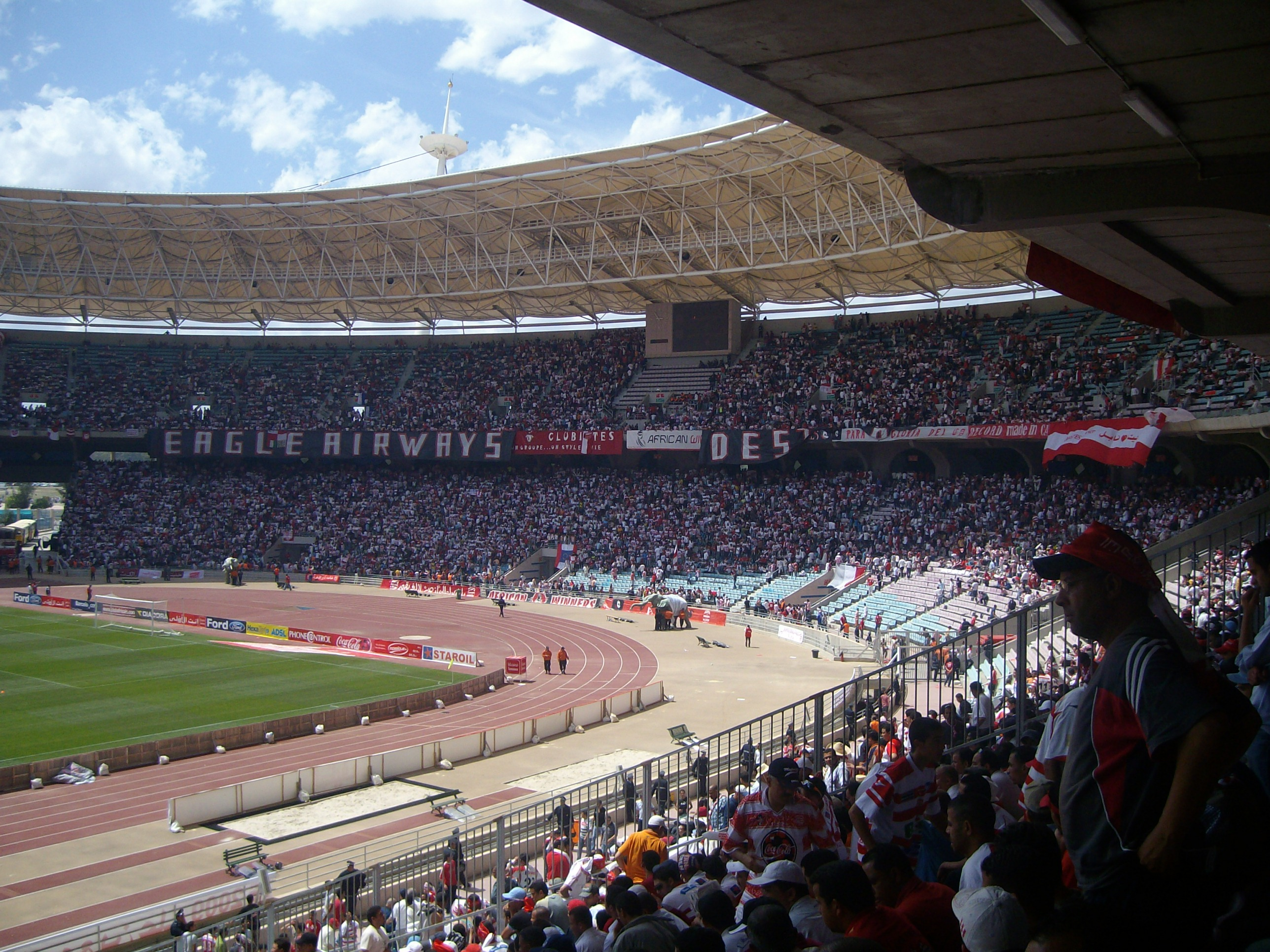
7 November Stadium in Radès, Tunisia hosted the second leg.

7 November Stadium is a multi-purpose stadium in Radès, Tunis, Tunisia about 10 kilometers south-east of the city center of Tunis, in the center of the Olympic City. It is currently used mostly for football matches and it also has facilities for athletics. The stadium holds 60,000 and was built in 2001 for the 2001 Mediterranean Games and is considered to be one of the best stadiums in Africa. The stadium was built for the 2001 Mediterranean Games, the 60,000-seat covered area covers 13,000 m2 and consists of a central area, 3 adjoining grounds, 2 warm-up rooms, 2 paintings and an official stand of 7,000 seats. The press gallery is equipped with 300 desks.

Club Africain and ES Tunis play their major league matches here. Before the construction of this stadium, the Tunis derby used to be played in the 45,000 seat-capacity Stade El Menzah. It is also the stadium of Tunisia national football team since 2001.

This stadium has hosted matches of the 2004 African Cup of Nations which was won by the Tunisian team.

The management of CS Sfaxien confirmed that it was necessary to transfer the match from the Stade Taïeb Mhiri in Sfax, which was held by all the matches of the team in the African competition this season to the Radès Stadium, because the capacity of the Radès Stadium is 60,000 spectators, while the capacity of the Stade Taïeb Mhiri does not exceed 20,000, which is what confirms the organization of the match on the field of the stadium of Sfax was difficult.

== Road to the final ==
Note: In all results below, the score of the finalist is given first.

(Egypt) Al-Ahly				Round	(Tunisia) CS Sfaxien			
Opponent	Agg.	1st leg	2nd leg	Qualifying rounds	Opponent	Agg.	1st leg	2nd leg
Bye				Preliminary round	(Niger) AS-FNIS	7–1	3–1 (A)	4–0 (H)
(Kenya) Tusker FC	5–0	2–0 (A)	3–0 (H)	First round	(Democratic Republic of the Congo) DC Motema Pembe	2–1	1–1 (H)	1–0 (A)
(Equatorial Guinea) Renacimiento FC	4–0	0–0 (A)	4–0 (A)	Second round	(Morocco) FAR Rabat	2–1	1–1 (H)	1–0 (A)
Opponent	Result			Group stage	Opponent	Result		
(Tunisia) CS Sfaxien	0–1 (A)			Matchday 1	(Egypt) Al-Ahly	1–0 (H)		
(Algeria) JS Kabylie	2–0 (H)			Matchday 2	(Ghana) Asante Kotoko	2–4 (A)		
(Ghana) Asante Kotoko	0–0 (A)			Matchday 3	(Algeria) JS Kabylie	1–0 (A)		
(Ghana) Asante Kotoko	4–0 (H)			Matchday 4	(Algeria) JS Kabylie	2–0 (H)		
(Tunisia) CS Sfaxien	2–1 (H)			Matchday 5	(Egypt) Al-Ahly	1–2 (A)		
(Algeria) JS Kabylie	2–2 (A)			Matchday 6	(Ghana) Asante Kotoko	2–1 (H)		
**Group A runner-up**: Pos / Team / Pld / W / D / L / GF / GA / GD / Pts / Qualification; 1 / (Tunisia) CS Sfaxien / 6 / 4 / 0 / 2 / 9 / 7 / +2 / **12** / **Advance to knockout stage**; **2** / (Egypt) Al Ahly / **6** / **3** / **2** / **1** / **10** / **4** / **+6** / **11** / **Advance to knockout stage**; 3 / (Ghana) Asante Kotoko / 6 / 2 / 1 / 3 / 7 / 10 / −3 / **7**; 4 / (Algeria) JS Kabylie / 6 / 1 / 1 / 4 / 4 / 9 / −5 / **4**; Source:				Final standings	**Group A winner**: Pos / Team / Pld / W / D / L / GF / GA / GD / Pts / Qualification; **1** / (Tunisia) CS Sfaxien / **6** / **4** / **0** / **2** / **9** / **7** / **+2** / **12** / **Advance to knockout stage**; 2 / (Egypt) Al Ahly / 6 / 3 / 2 / 1 / 10 / 4 / +6 / **11** / **Advance to knockout stage**; 3 / (Ghana) Asante Kotoko / 6 / 2 / 1 / 3 / 7 / 10 / −3 / **7**; 4 / (Algeria) JS Kabylie / 6 / 1 / 1 / 4 / 4 / 9 / −5 / **4**; Source:			
Opponent	Agg.	1st leg	2nd leg	Knock-out stage	Opponent	Agg.	1st leg	2nd leg
(Ivory Coast) ASEC Mimosas	3–2	2–0 (H)	1–2 (A)	Semifinals	(South Africa) Orlando Pirates	1–0	0–0 (A)	0–1 (H)

== Format ==
The final was decided over two legs, with aggregate goals used to determine the winner. If the sides were level on aggregate after the second leg, the away goals rule would have been applied, and if still level, the tie would have proceeded directly to a penalty shootout (no extra time is played).

== Matches ==
=== First leg ===
29 October 2006
18:00 GMT

Al-Ahly (Egypt)	1–1	(Tunisia) CS Sfaxien
Aboutrika 27'	[[[Category:All articles with unsourced statements]] Report]	Frimpong 53'

Cairo International Stadium, Cairo
Attendance: 74,000
Referee: Modou Sowe (Gambia)

**Al-Ahly**	**CS Sfaxien**

GK	1	(Egypt) Essam El Hadary
DF	26	(Egypt) Wael Gomaa
DF	7	(Egypt) Shady Mohamed
DF	6	(Egypt) Mohamed Sedik
DF	29	(Egypt) Ahmed Shedid	(substituted off) 71'
DF	25	(Egypt) Hossam Ashour
MF	17	(Egypt) Mohamed Shawky
MF	22	(Egypt) Mohamed Aboutrika
MF	8	(Egypt) Mohamed Barakat	(substituted off) 81'
MF	23	(Angola) Flávio
FW	19	(Egypt) Emad Meteb	(substituted off) 81'
Substitutes:
FW	2	(Egypt) Islam El-Shater	(substituted on) 71'
MF	24	(Egypt) Ahmed Hassan	(substituted on) 81'
MF	10	(Egypt) Wael Riad	(substituted on) 81'
Manager:
(Portugal) Manuel José

GK	1	(Tunisia) Ahmed Jaouachi
DF	4	(Tunisia) Wissem Abdi	Booked
DF	26	(Tunisia) Issam Merdassi
DF	7	(Tunisia) Fateh Gharbi
DF	2	(Tunisia) Amir Haj Massaoud
DF	25	(Tunisia) Chedi Hammami
MF	17	(Tunisia) Anis Boujelbene
MF	5	(Tunisia) Haythem Mrabet
MF	8	(Tunisia) Abdelkarim Nafti
MF	22	(Ghana) Joetex Asamoah Frimpong		(substituted off) 90'
FW	23	(Tunisia) Tarek Ziadi		(substituted off) 76'
Substitutes:
MF	9	(Ivory Coast) Blaise Kouassi		(substituted on) 76'
FW	6	(Tunisia) Chaker Bargaoui		(substituted on) 90'
Manager:
(Tunisia) Mrad Mahjoub

Assistant referees:
Lamine Camara (Gambia)
Hday Menah (Gambia)
Fourth official:
Sadek Abd Nabi (Egypt)

=== Second leg ===
11 November 2006
17:30 GMT

CS Sfaxien (Tunisia)	0–1	(Egypt) Al-Ahly
	[[[Category:All articles with unsourced statements]] Report]	Aboutrika 90+2'

Stade 7 November, Tunis
Attendance: 60,000
Referee: Coffi Codjia (Benin)

**CS Sfaxien**	**Al Ahly**

GK	1	(Tunisia) Ahmed Jaouachi
DF	4	(Tunisia) Bechir Mechergui
DF	26	(Tunisia) Issam Merdassi
DF	7	(Tunisia) Fateh Gharbi	Booked
DF	2	(Tunisia) Amir Haj Massaoud
DF	25	(Tunisia) Chedi Hammami		(substituted off) 90+5'
MF	17	(Tunisia) Anis Boujelbene	Booked
MF	5	(Tunisia) Haythem Mrabet
MF	8	(Tunisia) Abdelkarim Nafti
MF	22	(Ghana) Joetex Asamoah Frimpong
FW	23	(Tunisia) Tarek Ziadi		(substituted off) 81'
Substitutes:
MF	9	(Ivory Coast) Blaise Kouassi		(substituted on) 95'
FW	6	(Tunisia) Hamza Younes		(substituted on) 81'
Manager:
(Tunisia) Mrad Mahjoub

GK	1	(Egypt) Essam El Hadary
DF	26	(Egypt) Wael Gomaa
DF	7	(Egypt) Shady Mohamed
DF	6	(Egypt) Mohamed Sedik	(substituted off) 71'
DF	29	(Egypt) Ahmed Shedid
DF	25	(Egypt) Mohamed Abdallah	(substituted off) 64'
MF	17	(Egypt) Hossam Ashour
MF	22	(Ghana) Akwetey Mensah	(substituted off) 43'
MF	8	(Egypt) Hassan Mostafa	(substituted off) 81'
MF	23	(Egypt) Mohamed Aboutrika
FW	19	(Angola) Flávio
Substitutes:
FW	2	(Egypt) Emad Meteb	(substituted on) 43'
MF	24	(Egypt) Islam El-Shater	(substituted on) 64'
MF	10	(Egypt) Wael Riad	(substituted on) 71'
Manager:
(Portugal) Manuel José

Assistant referees:
Hong Adogovi (Benin)
Shanti Adrian (Benin)
Fourth official:
Jalloul Azouz (Tunisia)

== Notes and references ==
- 2006 CAF Champions League - cafonline.com
