= Dika =

Dika can refer to:

== People ==
=== Nickname ===
- Dika Stojanović (disambiguation)

=== Given name ===
- Dika Mem (born 1997), French handball player
- Dika Newlin (1923–2006), American composer
- Dika Toua (born 1984), Papua New Guinean weightlifter

=== Surname ===
- Amina Dika Abdullahi, Kenyan politician
- Albert Dominique Ebossé Bodjongo Dika (1989–2014), Cameroonian football forward
- Jean Dika Dika (born 1979), Cameroonian former football centre-back
- Nick Dika (fl. 2006–present), member of Canadian rock band Arkells
- Oksana Dika, Ukrainian operatic soprano
- Raditya Dika, Indonesian author and YouTuber

== Plants ==
- Irvingia gabonensis, tree species found in several West and Central African countries

== See also ==
- Dika Energiya, 2006 single by Ruslana
- Dika: Murder City, 1995 documentary
