= Kouakou =

Kouakou is both a given name and a surname. Notable people with the name include:

- Kouakou Hervé Koffi (born 1996), Burkinabé footballer
- Kouakou Komenan (born 1942), Ivorian sprinter
- Kouakou Privat Yao (born 1991), Ivorian footballer
- Romain Joy Kouakou Esse (born 2005), English footballer
- Atta Kouakou (1945–2010), Ivorian sprinter
- Aubin Kouakou (born 1991), Ivorian footballer
- Bernard Kouakou (born 1980), Ivorian footballer
- Brou Kouakou (born 1948), Ivorian athlete
- Charles-Antoine Kouakou (born 1998), French athlete
- Chris Kouakou (born 1999), Ivorian footballer
- Christian Kouakou (born 1991), Ivorian footballer
- Christian Kouakou (footballer, born 1995), Swedish footballer
- Fabrice Elysée Kouadio Kouakou (born 1990), Ivorian footballer
- Martin Fofié Kouakou (1968–2026), Ivorian military official
- Michel Kouakou, Ivorian choreographer
- Raoul Kouakou (born 1980), Ivorian footballer

== See also ==
- Noa Kouakou-Heugue (born 2007), French basketball player
