= Abubakari Kankani =

Ghanaian footballer

Abu Kankani
Personal information
- Full name: Abubakari Kankani
- Date of birth: December 25, 1976
- Place of birth: Accra, Ghana
- Position: Goalkeeper

Team information
- Current team: Norchip Sepe Timpom
- Number: 1

Senior career*
Years	Team	Apps	(Gls)
1995–2001	Accra Hearts of Oak SC		
2001–2002	Ghapoha Readers Tema		
2003–2006	Ghapoha United FC		
2006–2008	King Faisal Babes		
2009–	Norchip Sepe Timpom		

International career^{‡}
2001–2003	Ghana	4	(0)
- * Club domestic league appearances and goals as of 07 August 2008 ‡ National team caps and goals as of 07 August 2008

Abubakari Kankani (born December 25, 1976) is a Ghanaian football player currently playing at the position of goalkeeper for Norchip Sepe Timpom.

== International ==
Kankani played from 2001 to 2003 4 international games for Ghana. He played in the 2002 African Cup of Nations in Mali as the third keeper from Ghana after James Nanor and Sammy Adjei.
