= Serge Arnaud Aka =

Turkish footballer (born 1994)

Personal information
- Date of birth: 16 November 1994 (age 31)
- Place of birth: Divo, Ivory Coast
- Height: 1.83 m (6 ft 0 in)
- Position: Midfielder

Team information
- Current team: National Bank of Egypt
- Number: 14

Senior career*
Years	Team	Apps	(Gls)
2011–2012	Satellite		
2012–2013	Africa Sports		
2013–2015	Bouaké		
2015–2017	ASEC Mimosas	41	(1)
2018–2019	CS Sfaxien	2	(0)
2019–2021	El Gouna	65	(1)
2021–2023	Altay	7	(0)
2023	Ismaily	14	(0)
2023–	National Bank of Egypt	1	(0)
- * Club domestic league appearances and goals as of 18 September 2023

Serge Arnaud Aka (born 16 November 1994) is an Ivorian professional footballer who plays as a midfielder for Egyptian club National Bank of Egypt.

== Club career ==
Aka began his senior career with the Ivorian clubs Satellite, Africa Sports, Bouaké and ASEC Mimosas. He moved to Tunisia with CS Sfaxien in 2018. He joined El Gouna in the Egyptian Premier League on 2 January 2019. On 4 August 2021, he transferred to the Turkish club Altay, as they were newly promoted into the Süper Lig.

== International career ==
Aka was called up to the Ivory Coast national team for a pair of friendlies in May 2021.
