= 2002 CAF Cup final =

- Event: 2002 CAF Cup
JS Kabylie	Tonnerre Yaoundé
(Algeria)	(Cameroon)
4	1
- on aggregate

First leg
JS Kabylie	Tonnerre Yaoundé
4	0
- Date: 8 November 2002
- Venue: Stade 5 Juillet 1962, Algiers
- Referee: Coffi Codjia (Benin)
- Attendance: 80,000

Second Leg
Tonnerre Yaoundé	JS Kabylie
1	0
- Date: 24 November 2002
- Venue: Ahmadou Ahidjo Stadium, Yaoundé
- Referee: Hichem Guirat (Tunisia)
- Attendance: 30,000

The 2002 CAF Cup final was the final of the 2002 CAF Cup. JS Kabylie of Algeria beat Tonnerre Yaoundé of Cameroon 4–1 on aggregate to win their third title in the competition, and their third in a row.

== Route to the final ==
JS Kabylie			Round	Tonnerre Yaoundé		
Opponent	Result	Legs		Opponent	Result	Legs
Bye			First round	(Equatorial Guinea) Deportivo Mongomo	6–3	4–2 home, 2–1 away
(Senegal) ASEC Ndiambour	6–3	0–0 away, 6–3 home	Second round	(Gabon) TP Akwembé	3–2	1–0 home, 2–2 away
(Mali) Djoliba AC	2–1	2–1 home, 0–0 away	Quarter-finals	(Tunisia) Étoile du Sahel	2–2 (a)	1–2 away, 1–0 home
(Egypt) Al-Masry	2–1	0–1 away, 2–0 home	Semi-finals	(Ivory Coast) Satellite FC	2–2 (a)	1–0 home, 1–2 away

== Match details ==
=== First leg ===
8 November 2002

JS Kabylie (Algeria)	4–0	(Cameroon) Tonnerre Yaoundé
Amaouche 2'; Berguiga 45', 84'; Drioueche 61'	Report

Stade 5 Juillet 1962, Algiers
Attendance: 80,000
Referee: Coffi Codjia (Benin)

Mazembe:
GK	1	(Algeria) Lounès Gaouaoui
RB	2	(Algeria) Slimane Raho
CB	4	(Algeria) Noureddine Drioueche
CB	5	(Algeria) Brahim Zafour (c)
LB	19	(Algeria) Samir Djouder
DM	6	(Algeria) Farouk Belkaïd
CM	9	(Algeria) Lounés Bendahmane	Booked
RM	7	(Algeria) Mounir Dob	Booked	(substituted off) 76'
LM	13	(Algeria) Hakim Boubrit		(substituted off) 26'
CF	27	(Algeria) Yacine Amaouche		(substituted off) 89'
CF	15	(Algeria) Hamid Berguiga
Substitutes:
MF	17	(Algeria) Mohamed Meghraoui		(substituted on) 76'
FW	26	(Algeria) Rabie Dilmi		(substituted on) 26'
FW	30	(Algeria) Fodil Dob		(substituted on) 89'
GK	12	(Algeria) Lyamine Bougherara
FW	28	(Algeria) Hocine Hammoudi
MF		(Algeria) Nassim Hamlaoui
Manager:
(France) Jean-Yves Chay

Espérance:
GK	(Ivory Coast) Tamen Kemajou
RB	(Cameroon) Benoit Moussongui
CB	(Cameroon) Alain Olinga (c)	Booked
CB	(Cameroon) Gaston Bindzi	Booked
LB	(Cameroon) Ernest Apane
RM	(Cameroon) Jean-Pierre Mani	(red card) 31'
CM	(Liberia) Roberts Sesay
CM	(Cameroon) Jean Eyoum		(substituted off) 63'
LM	(Cameroon) Emmanuel Nana Bikoula
CF	(Cameroon) Jean-Marc Etougou		(substituted off) 50'
CF	(Liberia) Francis Doe
Substitutes:
DF	(Cameroon) Armand Dengoue		(substituted on) 50'
FW	(Cameroon) Hans Agbo		(substituted on) 63'
Manager:
(Cameroon) Richard Obatteba

Assistant referees:
Adjovi Hogue (Benin)
Awangui (Benin)

=== Second leg ===
24 November 2002

Tonnerre Yaoundé (Cameroon)	1–0	(Algeria) JS Kabylie
Eyoum 12'	Report

Ahmadou Ahidjo Stadium, Yaoundé
Attendance: 30,000
Referee: Hichem Guirat (Tunisia)

Tonnerre Yaoundé:
GK	(Ivory Coast) Tamen Kemajou
RB	(Cameroon) Nguini Mendouga	(yellow card) 88'
CB	(Cameroon) Gaston Bindzi
CB	(Liberia) Roberts Sesay
LB	(Liberia) Ben Teekloh		(substituted off) 68'
RM	(Cameroon) Alain Olinga (c)
CM	(Liberia) Emmanuel Nana Bikoula
CM	(Cameroon) Jean-Marc Etougou		(substituted off) 80'
LM	(Cameroon) Jean Eyoum
CF	(Cameroon) Hans Agbo		(substituted off) 50'
CF	(Liberia) Francis Doe
Substitutes:
DF	(Cameroon) Armand Dengoue		(substituted on) 68'
FW	(Cameroon) Armel Etoundi		(substituted on) 80'
Manager:
(Cameroon) Richard Obatteba

JS Kabylie:
GK	1	(Algeria) Lounès Gaouaoui
RB	2	(Algeria) Slimane Raho	(yellow card) 27'	(substituted off) 58'
CB	4	(Algeria) Noureddine Drioueche
CB	5	(Algeria) Brahim Zafour (c)
LB	19	(Algeria) Samir Djouder
DM	6	(Algeria) Farouk Belkaïd
CM	9	(Algeria) Lounés Bendahmane
RM	7	(Algeria) Mounir Dob
LM	30	(Algeria) Fodil Dob		(substituted off) 78'
CF	27	(Algeria) Yacine Amaouche
CF	15	(Algeria) Hamid Berguiga
Substitutes:
LM	13	(Algeria) Hakim Boubrit		(substituted on) 58'
FW	28	(Algeria) Hocine Hammoudi		(substituted on) 78'
GK	12	(Algeria) Lyamine Bougherara
Manager:
(France) Jean-Yves Chay

Assistant referees:
Taoufik Adjengui (Tunisia)
Taoufik Oueslati (Tunisia)
