= 2002 CAF Cup =

Tournament details
- Dates: 8 March 2002 – 24 November 2002
- Teams: 31

Final positions
- Champions: (Algeria) JS Kabylie (3rd title)
- Runners-up: (Cameroon) Tonnerre Yaoundé

Tournament statistics
- Matches played: 60
- Top scorer(s): (Cameroon) Gaspard Aloma (Cameroon) Daniel Wansi (5 goals)

The 2002 CAF Cup marked the 11th edition of Africa's then-tertiary club football tournament organised by CAF for clubs that finished as runners-up in their domestic leagues. The final was played over two legs at Stade du 5 Juillet, Algiers, Algeria and at Stade Ahmadou Ahidjo, Yaoundé, Cameroon. The competition was won by algerian club JS Kabylie, who defeated TKC of Cameroon after an aggregate result of 4–1. This victory made JS Kabylie the first and only team to win the CAF Cup three consecutive times, a feat that allowed them to permanently retain the trophy.

== First round ==
Team 1	Agg.	Team 2	1st leg	2nd leg
Saint George FC (Ethiopia)	1–0	(Uganda) Kampala City Council	1–0	0–0
Al-Hilal Club (Sudan)	2–3	(Tunisia) Étoile du Sahel	2–1	0–2
Kabwe Warriors F.C. (Zambia)	w/o^{1}	Botswana Defence Force XI	—	—
Al-Masry (Egypt)	4–0	(Kenya) Mathare United	2–0	2–0
JS Saint-Pierroise (Réunion)	2–2 (a)	(Madagascar) AS Adema	2–1	0–1
Mtibwa Sugar FC (Tanzania)	(a) 1–1	(Mozambique) Ferroviário	0–0	1–1
Al Tahaddi (Libya)	2–4	(Morocco) FUS Rabat	1–3	1–1
Satellite FC (Ivory Coast)	2–0	(Republic of the Congo) Manchester Congo Mouilla	1–0	1–0
Tonnerre Yaoundé (Cameroon)	6–3	(Equatorial Guinea) Deportivo Mongomo	4–2	2–1
TP Akwembé (Gabon)	(a) 4–4	(Democratic Republic of the Congo) SC Utexafrica	3–0	1–4
ASA (Angola)	1–1 (p)	(Rwanda) Rayon Sport	1–0	0–1
Goldfields (Ghana)	5–5 (a)	(Guinea) Satellite FC	4–3	1–2
Nassara Alkali Club (Niger)	1–6	(Togo) Maranatha F.C.	1–3	0–3
NPA FC (Nigeria)	2–4	(Mali) Djoliba AC	2–1	0–3
ASFA Yennenga (Burkina Faso)	1–1 (a)	(Senegal) ASC Ndiambour	1–1	0–0

^{1} Kabwe Warriors withdrew before the first leg
One team received a bye : JS Kabylie (Algeria)

=== First leg ===
8 March 2002

Al Tahaddi (Libya)	1–3	(Morocco) FUS Rabat
Jlaidi 74'		Dinari 13'; Bidoudane 20', 30'

28 March Stadium, Benghazi

9 March 2002

JS Saint-Pierroise (Réunion)	2–1	(Madagascar) AS Adema
Drula 47'; Quéré 68'		Fidele 56' (pen.)

Stade Michel Volnay, Saint-Pierre

9 March 2002

Mtibwa Sugar FC (Tanzania)	0–0	(Mozambique) Ferroviário

Manungu Stadium, Turiani

9 March 2002

Satellite FC (Ivory Coast)	1–0	(Republic of the Congo) Manchester Congo Mouilla
Ouattara 47'

Stade Imam Ali Timité, Bondoukou

9 March 2002

TP Akwembé (Gabon)	3–0	(Democratic Republic of the Congo) SC Utexafrica
Mboumba 30'; Akieremy 52'; Arnaud 72'

Stade Augustin Monédan de Sibang, Libreville

9 March 2002

ASFA Yennenga (Burkina Faso)	1–1	(Senegal) ASC Ndiambour
Fofana 87'		Diouf 84'

Stade du 4 Août, Ouagadougou

9 March 2002

Nassara Alkali Club (Niger)	0–3	(Togo) Maranatha F.C.
		Tchala 32' (pen.); Wakilou 67'; Alovi ?'

Stade Général Seyni Kountché, Niamey

9 March 2002

N.P.A. FC (Nigeria)	2–1	(Mali) Djoliba AC
Eyimofe 34'; Joseph 83'		Traoré 11'

National Stadium, Lagos

10 March 2002

Saint George FC (Ethiopia)	1–0	(Uganda) Kampala City Council
Feerah 80'

Addis Ababa Stadium, Addis Ababa

== Second round ==
Team 1	Agg.	Team 2	1st leg	2nd leg
Saint George FC (Ethiopia)	5–9	(Tunisia) Étoile du Sahel	2–1	3–8
Botswana Defence Force XI	4–4 (a)	(Egypt) Al-Masry	4–2	0–2
AS Adema (Madagascar)	(a) 2–2	(Tanzania) Mtibwa Sugar FC	1–0	1–2
Satellite FC (Ivory Coast)	1–0	(Morocco) FUS Rabat	1–0	0–0
Tonnerre Yaoundé (Cameroon)	3–2	(Gabon) TP Akwembé	1–0	2–2
Rayon Sport (Rwanda)	6–5	(Guinea) Satellite FC	2–3	4–2
Maranatha F.C. (Togo)	2–2 (a)	(Mali) Djoliba AC	2–1	0–1
ASC Ndiambour (Senegal)	3–6	(Algeria) JS Kabylie	0–0	3–6

== Quarter-finals ==
Team 1	Agg.	Team 2	1st leg	2nd leg
AS Adema (Madagascar)	0–3	(Egypt) Al-Masry	0–1	0–2
JS Kabylie (Algeria)	2–1	(Mali) Djoliba AC	2–1	0–0
Satellite FC (Ivory Coast)	4–1	(Rwanda) Rayon Sport	2–0	2–1
Étoile du Sahel (Tunisia)	2–2 (a)	(Cameroon) Tonnerre Yaoundé	2–1	0–1

== Semi-finals ==
Team 1	Agg.	Team 2	1st leg	2nd leg
Al-Masry (Egypt)	1–2	(Algeria) JS Kabylie	1–0	0–2
Tonnerre Yaoundé (Cameroon)	2–2 (a)	(Ivory Coast) Satellite FC	1–0	1–2

4 October 2002

Al-Masry (Egypt)	1–0	(Algeria) JS Kabylie
Ibrahim El-Masry 89'	Report

Port Said Stadium, Port Said
18 October 2002

JS Kabylie (Algeria)	2–0	(Egypt) Al-Masry
Bendahmane 17'; Belkaïd 89' (pen.)	Report

Stade 5 Juillet 1962, Algiers

JS Kabylie won 2–1 on aggregate and advanced to the final.

5 October 2002

Tonnerre Yaoundé (Cameroon)	1–0	(Ivory Coast) Satellite FC
Francis Doe 23'	Report

20 October 2002

Satellite FC (Ivory Coast)	2–1	(Cameroon) Tonnerre Yaoundé
Didi Gnepa 25'; 49'	Report	Alain Oniga 74'

2–2 on aggregate, Tonnerre Yaoundé won on away goals rule and advanced to the final.

== Finals ==
=== First leg ===
8 November 2002

JS Kabylie (Algeria)	4–0	(Cameroon) Tonnerre Yaoundé
Amaouche 2'; Berguiga 45', 85'; Drioueche 61'	Report

Stade 5 Juillet 1962, Alger
Attendance: 60,000

=== Second leg ===
24 November 2002

Tonnerre Yaoundé (Cameroon)	1–0	(Algeria) JS Kabylie
Eyoum 11'	Report

Stade Ahmadou Ahidjo, Yaoundé

JS Kabylie win 4–1 on aggregate

== Champions ==
2002 CAF Cup
Winners

JS Kabylie
Third Title

== See also ==
- 2002 CAF Champions League
- CAF Cup
