= Manchester Congo Mouilla =

Manchester SC
- Full name: Manchester Congo Mouilla
- Ground: Stade Alphonse Massemba-Débat; Brazzaville, Republic of the Congo
- Capacity: 33,037
- League: Congo Premier League

Manchester Congo Mouilla or simply Manchester is an African football club based in Republic of the Congo.

The team plays in the Congo Second Division.

== Stadium ==
The team plays at the Stade Alphonse Massemba-Débat.

== Performance in CAF competitions ==
- CAF Cup: 2 appearances

2002: First Round
2001: First Round

== Notable players ==
- Barel Mouko
