= SC Utexafrica =

Utexafrica
- Full name: Sports Club Utexafrica
- Ground: Stade des Martyrs, Kinshasa
- Capacity: 80,000
- League: Congolese Second Division

Sports Club Utexafrica, more commonly known as Utexafrica, is a Congolese football club based in Kinshasa.

== Performance in CAF competitions ==
- 2002 CAF Cup: first round

The club have 1 appearance in CAF Cup

== Stadium ==
Currently the team plays at the Stade des Martyrs.
