= Edward Weah Dixon =

Liberian footballer

Edward Dixon
Personal information
- Full name: Edward Weah Dixon
- Date of birth: May 8, 1976 (age 50)
- Place of birth: Monrovia, Liberia
- Height: 1.75 m (5 ft 9 in)
- Position: Midfielder

Senior career*
Years	Team	Apps	(Gls)
1993	Invincible Eleven		
1994–1997	Olympique Alès	34	(8)
1997–1998	Nîmes	0	(0)
1998–1999	Olympique Alès	11	(2)
1999–2000	Stade Beaucairois	37	(12)
2000–2001	AS Frontignan AC	0	(0)
2001–2002	FA L'Île-Rousse Monticello	25	(8)
2002–2004	Bourg-Péronnas	59	(12)
2004–2005	Vendée Luçon		
2005–2008	Thouars Foot 79		

International career
1992–2003	Liberia	7	(0)
- * Club domestic league appearances and goals

Edward Weah Dixon (born May 8, 1976) is a Liberian former professional footballer who played as a midfielder. He is a former member of the Liberia national team.
