= Satellite FC Abidjan =

Satellite
- Full name: Satellite FC du Plateau Abidjan
- Ground: Stade Imam Ali Timité; Abidjan, Ivory Coast
- Capacity: 7,000
- League: Championnat Division 3
Home colours	Away colours

Satellite FC is an Ivorian football club based in Abidjan.

The team plays in the Championnat Division 3 the Ivorian Third Division.

== Stadium ==
Currently the team plays at the 7000 capacity Stade Imam Ali Timité.

== Notable players ==
- Serge Maguy
- Issa Zongo
- Guillaume Dah Zadi

== Performance in CAF competitions ==
- 2002 CAF Cup: semi-final
