= Cosmas Banda =

Zambian footballer (born 1975)

Personal information
- Date of birth: 29 December 1975 (age 50)
- Position: Striker

Senior career*
Years	Team	Apps	(Gls)
1998	Lusaka Dynamos		
1999–2005	Zanaco		
2005–2006	Sarawak FA		
2006–2007	Perlis FA		
2007	City of Lusaka		
2008	Lusaka Dynamos		

International career
1996–2002	Zambia	12	(2)
- * Club domestic league appearances and goals

Cosmas Banda (born 29 December 1975) is a Zambian footballer who played as a striker. He played in 12 matches for the Zambia national football team from 1996 to 2002. He was also named in Zambia's squad for the 2002 African Cup of Nations tournament.
