= Ali Ouédraogo =

Burkinabé footballer

Ali Ouédraogo (born 31 December 1976) is a Burkinabé football player who, as of 2006, was playing for Etoile Filante Ouagadougou.

He was part of the Burkinabé 2002 African Nations Cup team, who finished bottom of group B in the first round of competition, thus failing to secure qualification for the quarter-finals.
