= Dika Newlin =

American composer and musicologist (1923–2006)

Dika Newlin

Dika Newlin (November 22, 1923 – July 22, 2006) was a composer, pianist, professor, musicologist, and punk rock singer. She received a Ph.D. from Columbia University at the age of 22. She was one of the last living students of Arnold Schoenberg and was a Schoenberg scholar and a professor at Virginia Commonwealth University in Richmond from 1978 to 2004. She performed as an Elvis impersonator and played punk rock while in her seventies in Richmond, Virginia.

She was featured in the documentary Dika: Murder City.

A child prodigy, she wrote a symphonic piece at age 8 that was performed by the Cincinnati Symphony Orchestra.

== Early life ==
Dika Newlin was born in Portland, Oregon. Her name was chosen by her mother and refers to an Amazon in one of Sappho's poems. Her parents were academics and her family moved to East Lansing, Michigan, so that her father could teach English at Michigan State University. Neither of her parents were musicians, but her grandmother was a piano teacher and her uncle a composer. A child prodigy, Newlin was able to read the dictionary by age 3 and started piano lessons at age 6 with Arthur Farwell. He encouraged her early interest in composing, and when she was 8 she wrote a symphonic piece, Cradle Song, that was added to the repertoire of Cincinnati orchestra conductor Vladimir Bakaleinikoff and performed three years later by the Cincinnati Symphony Orchestra. A few years later, in 1941, the work was performed in New York with another prodigy, 11-year-old Lorin Maazel, at the NBC Summer Symphony podium and at Interlochen Arts Camp. Bakaleinikoff was impressed by her composition ability and encouraged her to study with Arnold Schoenberg, reportedly telling her parents that "she must go to Schoenberg now. It's exactly the right time....Do it for the sake of American music!"

== Education ==
Newlin entered elementary school at age 5 and finished it at age 8. She graduated from high school when she was 12 and was admitted to the freshman class at Michigan State University, where her parents taught. In her junior year, she enrolled at the University of California at Los Angeles, where Schoenberg was currently teaching. She returned to Michigan State in 1939, where at age 16 she graduated with her bachelor's degree in French literature. She then returned to Los Angeles to continue studying with Schoenberg, accompanied by her mother because she was so young.

Newlin kept a diary of her studies with Schoenberg, whom she called "Uncle Arnold." She published the diary in 1980 as Schoenberg Remembered: Diaries and Recollections (1938–1976). One entry in the diary relates how Schoenberg criticized her string quartet writing as "too pianistic." After she acknowledged that she knew it wasn't the best, Schoenberg replied: "No, it is not the best, nor even the second best—perhaps the 50th best, yes?"

She finished her master's degree in 1941, and then went to Columbia University to pursue doctoral studies, and received Columbia's first doctorate in musicology in 1945 at age 22. Newlin's doctoral dissertation was published in 1947 as the book Bruckner, Mahler, Schoenberg. A revised and expanded version was issued by W.W. Norton, New York, in 1978. While at Columbia she studied with among others Roger Sessions, Artur Schnabel, and Rudolf Serkin. Her thesis advisor and the university's department head at the time was Paul Henry Lang – as Newlin reports "no fan of Mahler, Bruckner or Schoenberg, but objective enough to support a student's authoring a good dissertation about them".

Newlin also edited Schoenberg’s essay collection Style and Idea (1950) in collaboration with the author and translated into English those essays which were originally written in German.

== Academic and musical career ==
After receiving her doctorate, Newlin taught at Western Maryland College from 1945-1949 and then at Syracuse University from 1949-1951. She returned to work with Schoenberg in the summers of 1949 and 1950. In late 1949 her English translation of Schoenberg and his School (by René Leibowitz, another Schoenberg student) was published, and around this time she decided to write his biography and received a Fulbright grant to research his early years in Vienna. She spent a year in Austria, and also performed in Paris, lectured on American music, and made recordings with violist Michael Mann. She also performed the piano part of her Piano Trio, op. 2 in Salzburg at the 1952 Festival of the International Society for Contemporary Music.

After returning to the United States, in 1952, she founded Drew University's music department, where she taught until 1965. She then moved to the University of North Texas, where she taught until 1973 when she went to Montclair State University to direct the Electronic Music Laboratory. In 1976, she resigned to spend two years writing and composing, and then in 1978 joined Virginia Commonwealth University to develop a new doctoral program in music. She also worked as the university's composition coordinator.

Newlin, among the last surviving students of Schoenberg, was "one of the pioneers of Schoenberg research in America," according to Dr. Sabine Feisst, a professor of musicology at Arizona State University. Newlin later wrote a biography of Schoenberg for the Encyclopædia Britannica, in addition to many other articles and translations on musical subjects.

Newlin's compositions include three operas, a piano concerto, a chamber symphony, and numerous chamber, vocal and mixed-media works. Her mixed-media compositions are largely lost because no one recorded them on video; sound recordings exist in the University of North Texas Music Library.

Newlin also translated many of Schoenberg's works from German to English. Newlin herself sang in a costumed performance of Schoenberg's Pierrot Lunaire, which she had translated into English, in Lubbock, Texas in 1999.

=== Punk rocker ===
Starting in the mid-1980s, Newlin unveiled a new persona in the form of a leather-clad punk rocker with bright orange hair. In this guise, she appeared in horror movies by Richmond producer Michael D. Moore. In director Tim Ritter's 1995 film Creep, she played a person wearing a leather motorcycle jacket who puts poison in baby food at a supermarket.

That same year, Moore directed the documentary about Newlin titled Dika: Murder City. The title was taken from a song Newlin had performed in her solo "cabaret" act for a few years before it became a popular performance piece for her band ApoCowLypso, formed in 1985 with fellow area singer/songwriters Brooke Saunders and Manko Eponymous as well as Hunter Duke on drums. With Apocowlypso Newlin performed lead and backing vocals as well as percussion (washboard, tambourine, temple bells) in their peculiar live shows and on the cassette-only EP "Meat the Apocowlypso," the "Electronic Preacher/Richmond Flood" single, and the bootleg "Let It Was" recording. After going through over 20 bass players in their short time together, the members of Apocowlypso went their separate ways in 1988 to pursue other projects.

Newlin was in the GWAR movie Skulhedface in 1994.

== Miscellaneous ==
In 1939 the New York Herald Tribune wrote that Dika Newlin had the highest I.Q. score of any Michigan State University student at that time.

On 13 August 1964 Newlin was in London for the premiere of the full-length Performing Version of Mahler's unfinished 10th Symphony prepared by Deryck Cooke. After the performance, she presented Cooke with the Kilenyi Mahler Medal of the Bruckner Society of America.

Newlin posed for a pinup calendar when she was in her seventies.

Reporters who interviewed her at home noted that a medieval suit of armor was suspended over her mattress on the floor of her bedroom.

During the 1980s and 1990s, Dika Newlin could often be seen in Richmond wheeling her papers and other belongings along the sidewalk of Grace Street in a shopping cart, between her teaching job at VCU and her columnist job at Richmond Newspapers, some 12 blocks away. She would typically be wearing a gaudy dress and gaudier red lipstick and by the end of the walk would be huffing and puffing from the exertion. This comical image she presented in these daily walks caused her to be known locally as "The Bag Lady of Music".

Newlin died in Richmond, Virginia from complications of a broken arm she suffered in an accident on June 30, 2006.

== List of works ==
- Piano trio, op. 2
- Der du von dem Himmel bist, 1968
- Ageless Icon: The Greatest Hits of Dika Newlin, 2004
- Alien Baby
- Septet in Seven Movements
- Love Songs for People Who Hate Each Other
- Machine Shop
- Murder Kitty

=== Operas ===
- Smile Right to the Bone, 1941
- Feathertop, 1942
- The Scarlet Letter, 1945

=== Symphonic works ===
- Cradle Song

=== Lied Songs ===
- A little flower
- I saw in Louisiana a live-oak growing
- Lullaby
- To Mrs. Anna Flaxman

== Publications ==
- 'A Final Musical Testament', The New Leader, 14 Sept 1964, pp. 20–21 (On Deryck Cooke's Performing Version of Mahler's 10th Symphony)
- Schoenberg Remembered: Diaries and Recollections (1938–1976). New York: Pendragon Press (1980). ISBN 0-918728-14-2.
- Bruckner, Mahler, Schoenberg. Written as a dissertation in 1945 and published in 1947.
- "Bruckner's Three Great Masses," Chord and Discord, vol. 2 no. 8, 1958, pp. 21–26.
- "Four Revolutionaries c.1900-60," Choral Music, 1963, pp. 305–323.
- "Arnold Schoenberg as Choral Composer," American Choral Review, vol. 6 no. 4, 1964, pp. 7–11.
- "C.P.E. Bach and Arnold Schoenberg: a Comparison," The Commonwealth of Music, in Honor of Curt Sachs, 1965, pp. 300–306.
- "The Role of the Chorus in Schoenberg's 'Moses and Aaron'", American Choral Review, vol. 9 no. 1, 1966, pp. 1–4.
- "The Schoenberg–Nachod Collection: a Preliminary Report," MQ, vol. 54, 1968, pp. 31–46.
- "Notes from a Schoenberg Biography: From my Los Angeles Diary, 1939," Journal of the Arnold Schoenberg Institute, vol. 1 no. 3, 1977, pp. 126–136.
- "The 'Mahler's Brother Syndrome': Necropsychiatry and the Artist," MQ, vol. 66, 1980, pp. 296–304.
- "Secret Tonality in Schoenberg's Piano Concerto," Perspectives of New Music, vol. 13 no. 1, 1974, pp. 137–139.
- "Music for the Flickering Image: American Film Scores," Music Educators Journal, vol. 64 no. 1, 1977, pp. 24–35.
- "The Later Works of Ernest Bloch," The Musical Quarterly, vol. 33 no. 4, 1947, pp. 443–459.
- "Why Is Schoenberg's Biography So Difficult to Write?" Perspectives of New Music, vol. 12 no. 1/2, 1973, pp. 40–42.
- "Some Tonal Aspects of Twelve-Tone Music," American Music Teacher, vol. 3 no. 2, 1953, pp. 2–3, 18.
