= Chaker Bargaoui =

Tunisian international footballer

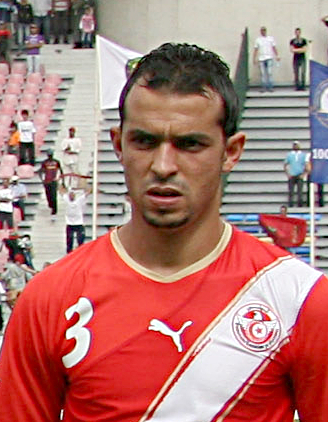

Personal information
- Date of birth: 4 April 1983 (age 43)
- Place of birth: Siliana, Tunisia
- Height: 1.76 m (5 ft 9 in)
- Position: Midfielder

Senior career*
Years	Team	Apps	(Gls)
2003–2013	CS Sfaxien		
2013–2014	CA Bizertin	23	(0)
2014–2015	Stade Tunisien	1	(0)
Total		24+	(0+)

International career
2010–2011	Tunisia	2	(0)
- * Club domestic league appearances and goals

Chaker Bargaoui (born 4 April 1983) is a Tunisian former footballer who played as a midfielder.

== Career ==
Born in Siliana, Bargaoui played for CS Sfaxien, CA Bizertin and Stade Tunisien.

He earned 2 caps for the Tunisian national team between 2010 and 2011.
