= Alexis Mbongo Tekumu =

Congolese football player (born 1982)

Alexis Tekumu Mbongo
Personal information
- Full name: Alexis Tekumu Mbongo
- Date of birth: 20 July 1982 (age 44)
- Positions: Forward; winger; midfielder

Senior career*
Years	Team	Apps	(Gls)
2001/2002	Servette FC		
20xx–2008	Swiss clubs		
2008	WS Woluwe		
2008–2009	Hibernians F.C.		(3)
- Swiss clubs

International career
2000–2002	DR Congo	7	(0)
- * Club domestic league appearances and goals

Alexis Mbongo Tekumu (born 20 July 1982) is a Congolese retired footballer.

== Career ==
=== Belgium ===
Introduced at WS Woluwe over the course of winter 2007/08, Tekumu opened his goal account with Les Étoilés that January, stating that their goal was promotion. Desiring to leave by the middle of May, he was dismissed shortly afterwards.

=== Malta ===
Debuting as Hibernians overwhelmed 4–0 on the 31st of August 2008, the Congolese international was punished with a suspension as the Paolites held Valletta 1-1, returning two weeks later. However, when allowed to spend one week at home in Switzerland, he did not go back to Malta, one of the repercussion of personal problems back home.
