= Pihouri Weboanga =

Burkinabé football manager

Personal information
- Place of birth: Burkina Faso

Managerial career
- Years: Team
- 2002: Burkina Faso

Pihouri Weboanga is a Burkinabé football manager, who managed the Burkina Faso national team in 2002 alongside Jacques Yaméogo.
