= Jean-Paul Boeka-Lisasi =

Congolese association football player

Personal information
- Full name: Gauthier Jean-Paul Boeka-Lisasi
- Date of birth: 6 June 1974 (age 52)
- Place of birth: Kinshasa, Zaire
- Height: 1.80 m (5 ft 11 in)
- Position: Centre forward

Senior career*
Years	Team	Apps	(Gls)
1994–1996	Vita Club		
1996–2000	Lokeren	77	(19)
2000–2001	Westerlo	30	(12)
2001–2002	Mechelen	39	(20)
2002–2003	Charleroi	18	(7)
2003–2004	Club Africain	7	(0)
2004	AEL Limassol	10	(5)
2004–2005	Kortrijk	3	(0)
2005	Verbroedering Denderhoutem	13	(6)
2005–2006	Hapoel Haifa		
2006	KSV Bornem	10	(3)
2006–2007	Kontich FC		
Total		206+	(72+)

International career
1999–2002	DR Congo	6	(0)
- * Club domestic league appearances and goals

Gauthier Jean-Paul Boeka-Lisasi (born 6 June 1974) is a Congolese former footballer who played as a centre forward. He played club football for Vita Club, Lokeren, Westerlo, Mechelen, Charleroi, Club Africain, AEL Limassol, Kortrijk, Verbroedering Denderhoutem, Hapoel Haifa, KSV Bornem, Kontich FC and international football for the DR Congo national football team.
