= Adama Diakité (footballer, born 1978) =

Malian footballer

Personal information
- Date of birth: 4 July 1978 (age 48)
- Position: Defender

Senior career*
Years	Team	Apps	(Gls)
- Centre Salif Keita
- Stade Malien
- Djoliba AC
- Stade Malien

International career
2001–2002	Mali	10	(0)
- * Club domestic league appearances and goals

Adama Diakité (born 4 July 1978) is a Malian footballer. He played in ten matches for the Mali national football team in 2001 and 2002. He was also named in Mali's squad for the 2002 African Cup of Nations tournament.
