= Dika: Murder City =

- Directed by: Michael D. Moore
- Starring: Dika Newlin
- Release date: 1995
- Language: English

Dika: Murder City is a 1995 documentary film by Michael D. Moore on the late-life punk rock career of composer/singer Dika Newlin. The film features Newlin, who was 74 years old when the film was shot, in concert at a Richmond, Virginia, club where she is wearing black leather garb and singing punk versions of Elvis Presley and Nancy Sinatra songs. Newlin also talks about her childhood musical training with Arnold Schoenberg, and she performs several of her original songs. She also offers a Gioachino Rossini aria, Duetto Buffo di Due Gatti ("humorous duet for two cats") in which she meows the entire number. A clip from the 1968 film Night of the Living Dead is included in the film.
