= Boston Mwanza =

Zambian footballer (born 1977)

Personal information
- Date of birth: 26 December 1977 (age 48)
- Position: Midfielder

International career
Years	Team	Apps	(Gls)
2001–2002	Zambia	4	(0)

Boston Mwanza (born 26 December 1977) is a Zambian former professional footballer who played as a midfielder. He played in four matches for the Zambia national team in 2001 and 2002. He was also named in Zambia's squad for the 2002 African Cup of Nations tournament.
