= Aboubacar Haïdara =

Malian footballer

Personal information
- Date of birth: 20 November 1977 (age 48)
- Height: 1.76 m (5 ft 9 in)
- Position: Midfielder

Senior career*
Years	Team	Apps	(Gls)
–2001	Al Ittihad		
2001–	Ghazl El Suez		
–2007	Smouha		
2007–2009	Tersana		(3)
- El Entag El Harby
- Al Masry

International career
1999–2002	Mali	3	(0)
- * Club domestic league appearances and goals

Aboubacar Haïdara (born 20 November 1977) is a Malian footballer. He played in three matches for the Mali national football team from 1999 to 2002. He was also named to Mali's squad for the 2002 African Cup of Nations tournament.
