= Emir Mkademi =

Tunisian retired footballer

Personal information
- Full name: Emir Mkademi
- Date of birth: August 20, 1978 (age 48)
- Place of birth: Tunis, Tunisia
- Height: 1.76 m (5 ft 9 1/2 in)
- Position: Midfielder

Senior career*
Years	Team	Apps	(Gls)
1998–2003	Etoile Sahel		
2003–2004	Espérance		
2005	Akçaabat Sebatspor	2	(0)
2005	FK Karvan	5	(0)
2006	Espérance		
2006–2007	CA Bizertin		
2007–2008	Itesalat		

International career
2000–2002	Tunisia	11	(0)
- * Club domestic league appearances and goals

Emir Mkademi (Arabic: أمير مقدمي) (born August 20, 1978) is a Tunisian former footballer who played as a defender.

== Career ==
Mkademi began his career at Etoile Sahel, where he won the CAF Cup in 1999, before moving to Espérance five years later during the summer of 2003. With Espérance Mkademi won the 2003 African Cup Winners' Cup before moving to Turkish side Akçaabat Sebatspor during the winter transfer window of the 2004/05 season, and then moving to FK Karvan in the Azerbaijan Premier League six months later. After six-months with Karvan Mkademi returned to Espérance before moving to Itesalat in Egypt during the summer of 2007.

== International career ==
Mkademi was first called up to the Tunisian national team for their Africa Cup of Nations qualifier against Gabon in June 2001, and was an unused sub in all three of Tunisia' 2002 FIFA World Cup games.

== Career statistics ==
=== Club ===
Club performance			League		Cup		Continental		Total	
Season	Club	League	Apps	Goals	Apps	Goals	Apps	Goals	Apps	Goals
Azerbaijan			League		Azerbaijan Cup		Europe		Total	
2004-05	FK Karvan	Azerbaijan Premier League	5	0	0	0	-		5	0
Total	Azerbaijan		5	0	0	0	0	0	5	0
Career total			5	0	0	0	0	0	5	0

=== International ===
Appearances and goals by national team and year
National team	Year	Apps	Goals
Tunisia	2000	3	0
Tunisia	2001	2	0
Tunisia	2002	6	0
Total		11	0

== Honours ==
=== Club ===
ES Sahel

- CAF Cup
  - Winner (1): 1999

Espérance

- African Cup Winners' Cup
  - Winner (1): 2003
