= Abdoulaye Diakité (footballer) =

Malian footballer

Personal information
- Date of birth: 13 January 1977 (age 49)
- Position: Goalkeeper

Senior career*
Years	Team	Apps	(Gls)
- Djoliba AC

International career
2000–2010	Mali	5	(0)
- * Club domestic league appearances and goals

Abdoulaye Diakité (born 13 January 1977) is a Malian footballer who played as a goalkeeper. He played in five matches for the Mali national football team from 2000 to 2010, and was also named in Mali's squad for the 2002 African Cup of Nations tournament. At the club level he served as team captain for Djoliba AC.
