= Jacques Yaméogo =

Burkinabé footballer (1943–2010)

Personal information
- Date of birth: 24 July 1943
- Place of birth: Bobo-Dioulasso, Upper Volta
- Date of death: 19 June 2010 (aged 66)
- Place of death: Bobo-Dioulasso, Burkina Faso

Senior career*
Years	Team	Apps	(Gls)
- RC Bobo Dioulasso
- Étoile Filante de Koudougou
- US Yatenga

Managerial career
- Burkina Faso U17
- 2002: Burkina Faso
- * Club domestic league appearances and goals

Jacques Yaméogo (24 July 1943 – 19 June 2010) was a Burkinabé football player and manager.

== Career ==
Yaméogo was born in Bobo-Dioulasso. He played for RC Bobo Dioulasso, Étoile Filante de Koudougou and US Yatenga.

Yaméogo led the Burkina Faso U17 national team at the FIFA U-17 World Championship in 1999 and 2001. In 2002, he worked with Pihouri Weboanga as a head coach of the Burkina Faso national senior team.

== Death ==
Yaméogo died on 19 June 2010 at his home in Bobo-Dioulasso.
