= Koffi Olympio =

Togolese footballer

Personal information
- Date of birth: 18 April 1975 (age 51)
- Place of birth: Lomé, Togo
- Height: 1.85 m (6 ft 1 in)
- Position: Defender

Senior career*
Years	Team	Apps	(Gls)
1994–1999	Beauvais		
1999	USM Senlis		
2000–2001	ES La Rochelle		
2001–2003	Moulins		

International career
2000–2002	Togo	8	(0)
- * Club domestic league appearances and goals

Koffi Olympio (born 18 April 1975) is a Togolese former professional footballer who played as a defender. He played in eight matches for the Togo national team from 2000 to 2002. He was also named in Togo's squad for the 2002 African Cup of Nations tournament.
