= Issa Zongo =

Burkinabé footballer

Personal information
- Full name: Issa Zongo
- Date of birth: 27 July 1980 (age 46)
- Place of birth: Abidjan, Ivory Coast
- Position: Midfielder

Senior career*
Years	Team	Apps	(Gls)
2002–2003	Satellite FC Abidjan		
2004–	ASFA Yennenga		

International career
2000–2002	Burkina Faso	9	(0)
- * Club domestic league appearances and goals

Issa Zongo (born 27 July 1980 in Abidjan) is a Burkinabé footballer. He played for ASFA Yennenga.

== Career ==
Zongo previously played for Satellite FC Abidjan and signed in January 2004 with ASFA Yennenga.

== International career ==
Zongo was part of the Burkinabé 2002 African Nations Cup team, who finished bottom of group B in the first round of competition, thus failing to secure qualification for the quarter-finals.

== Clubs ==
- 2002-2004 Satellite FC du Plateau Abidjan
- 2004–present ASFA Yennenga
