= Pascal Kalemba =

Congolese footballers (1979–2012)

Personal information
- Full name: Pascal Lukoki Kalemba
- Date of birth: 26 February 1979
- Place of birth: Kinshasa, Zaire
- Date of death: 27 November 2012 (aged 33)
- Place of death: Kinshasa, DR Congo
- Position: Goalkeeper

Senior career*
Years	Team	Apps	(Gls)
2001–2003	TP Mazembe		
2004–2005	AS Vita Club		
2006–2007	Delta Téléstar		
2007–2009	DC Motema Pembe		
2009–2012	Missile FC		

International career
2001–2006	DR Congo	25	(0)
- * Club domestic league appearances and goals

Pascal Lukoki Kalemba (26 February 1979 – 27 November 2012) was a Congolese footballer who played as a goalkeeper.

== Career ==
Born in Kinshasa, Kalemba played club football in the DR Congo and Gabon for TP Mazembe, AS Vita Club, Delta Téléstar, DC Motema Pembe and Missile FC.

He earned 25 caps for the national team between 2001 and 2006, representing them at the African Cup of Nations in 2002 and 2006. He also played in nine FIFA World Cup qualifying matches.

== Later life and death ==
He died on 27 November 2012.
