= Haitham Mrabet =

Tunisian footballer

Personal information
- Date of birth: 15 October 1980 (age 46)
- Place of birth: Sfax, Tunisia
- Height: 1.79 m (5 ft 10 1/2 in)
- Position: Midfielder

Senior career*
| Years | Team | Apps | (Gls) |
| 2003–2011 | CS Sfaxien | | |
| 2010 | → Al-Merreikh (loan) | | |
| 2011–2012 | Étoile du Sahel | | |

International career
| 2005–2010 | Tunisia | 4 | (0) |
- * Club domestic league appearances and goals

Haitham Mrabet (born 15 October 1980) is a Tunisian former footballer who played as a midfielder. He has also appeared for the Tunisia national team.

== Career ==
Born in Sfax, Mrabet played club football for CS Sfaxien, Al-Merreikh and Étoile du Sahel.

Mrabet earned 5 international caps for Tunisia between 2005 and 2010, which included appearing in one FIFA World Cup qualifying match. He was a squad member at the 2010 Africa Cup of Nations.
