= TP Akwembe =

TP Akwembé
- Full name: Tout Puissant Akwembe
- Ground: Stade Augustin Monédan de Sibang; Libreville, Gabon
- Capacity: 7.000
- Chairman: (Gabon) Vincent de Paul
- Manager: (Gabon) Six Moulouma
- League: Gabon Championnat National D2
Home colours	Away colours

Tout Puissant Akwembe is a Gabonese football club based in Libreville. They play in the Gabon Championnat National D2.

== Stadium ==
Currently the team plays at the 7000 capacity Stade Augustin Monédan de Sibang.

== Performance in CAF competitions ==
- 2002 CAF Cup: second round (Round-of-16)
