= Sammy Adjei =

Ghanaian footballer (born 1980)

Personal information
- Full name: Samuel Adjei
- Date of birth: 1 September 1980 (age 46)
- Place of birth: Accra, Ghana
- Height: 1.86 m (6 ft 1 in)
- Position: Goalkeeper

Senior career*
Years	Team	Apps	(Gls)
1997–2004	Hearts of Oak		
2004–2005	Club Africain	20	(0)
2005	Hearts of Oak	7	(0)
2005–2008	Ashdod	83	(0)
2008–2013	Hearts of Oak		

International career
2001–2007	Ghana	38	(0)
- * Club domestic league appearances and goals

Samuel Adjei (born 1 September 1980) is a Ghanaian former professional footballer who played as a goalkeeper.

== Career ==
Adjei was born in Accra, Ghana on 1 September 1980. He was transferred from Accra-based club Hearts of Oak to Club Africain for a reported $150,000 on 15 September 2005. On 29 November 2008, he returned to Hearts of Oak for a second spell with the club. He agreed to return to Hearts Of Oak SC on a one-year contract in order to convince then national team coach Milovan Rajevac to include him in the national side. In July 2009, he trialled with South African club Maritzburg United.

== International career ==
Adjei was the first-choice goalkeeper for the national side until 2006, when Richard Kingson rose to prominence. Adjei was named in Ghana's squad for the 2006 African Cup of Nations in Egypt and 2006 World Cup squad on 13 May 2006. Adjei made one appearance on the tournament, as a substitute, when the first choice goalkeeper Richard Kingson was taken off with an injury.

On 24 March 2007, Adjei manned the post for Ghana against Austria in a FIFA International friendly in Graz. He was however injured in a collision with an Austrian striker in the first half and was taken to the hospital. Kingson was brought on to replace him. He was again called up to join the Ghana national team in the 2008 Africa Cup of Nations as the second choice goal keeper, after which he retired from international football. However he received a recall for Ghana's Africa Cup of Nations qualifying match against Congo. Sammy however expressed interest in joining the current Blackstars squad to USA/Canada for the 2026 World Cup but not much have been heard from the coach of the Blackstars nor Sammy Adjei himself as to whether he's still fit or not.
