= Ahmed Jaouachi =

Tunisian footballer

Ahmed El-Jaouachi
Personal information
- Full name: Ahmed El-Jaouachi
- Date of birth: 13 July 1975 (age 51)
- Place of birth: Tunisia
- Position: Goalkeeper

Senior career*
Years	Team	Apps	(Gls)
- US Monastir
- CS Sfaxien
- Étoile Sahel

International career
2002	Tunisia	1	(0)
- * Club domestic league appearances and goals

Ahmed El-Jaouachi (Arabic: أحمد الجوّاشي) (born 13 July 1975) is a Tunisian former professional footballer who played as a goalkeeper.

He previously played for a few clubs, including US Monastir, CS Sfaxien and Étoile Sahel with which he participated in the 2007 FIFA Club World Cup.

El-Jaouachi also played a one-match for the Tunisia national team and participated in the 2002 FIFA World Cup.
