= Bernard Kouakou =

Ivorian footballer

Personal information
- Full name: Bernard Kouakou Kouassi
- Date of birth: 1 January 1980 (age 46)
- Place of birth: Abidjan, Ivory Coast
- Position: Goalkeeper

International career
Years	Team	Apps	(Gls)
2001	Ivory Coast	1	(0)

Bernard Kouakou Kouassi (born 1 January 1980) is an Ivorian former professional footballer who played as a goalkeeper. He played in one match for the Ivory Coast national team in 2001. He was also named in Ivory Coast's squad for the 2002 African Cup of Nations tournament.
