= Jean Dika Dika =

Cameroonian footballer

Personal information
- Date of birth: 4 June 1979 (age 47)
- Place of birth: Douala, Cameroon
- Position: Centre-back

Youth career
- Maritime Douala

Senior career*
Years	Team	Apps	(Gls)
1998–2003	Atlético Madrid B	45	(1)
2000–2001	→ Getafe	17	(1)
2001–2002	→ União de Lamas	5	(0)
2003–2005	LASK	21	(1)
2005–2006	FC Ashdod	2	(0)

International career
2001–2002	Cameroon	5	(0)
Medal record
Men's football
Representing Cameroon
Africa Cup of Nations
Winner	2002 Mali
- * Club domestic league appearances and goals

Jean Dika Dika (born 4 June 1979) is a Cameroonian former professional footballer. A centre-back, played in five matches for the Cameroon national team in 2001 and 2002. He was also named in Cameroon's squad for the 2002 African Cup of Nations tournament.

== Honours ==
Cameroon

- African Cup of Nations: 2002
