= Anis Boujelbene =

Tunisian footballer

Personal information
- Full name: Anis Ahmed Boujelbene
- Date of birth: 6 February 1978 (age 48)
- Place of birth: Sfax, Tunisia
- Height: 1.68 m (5 ft 6 in)
- Position: Centre midfielder

Youth career
- CS Sfaxien

Senior career*
Years	Team	Apps	(Gls)
1997–2007	CS Sfaxien	119	(9)
2007–2009	Al Ahly	41	(0)
2009	Al Khaleej		
2009–2010	Club Africain	14	(0)

International career
1999–2008	Tunisia	9	(0)

Managerial career
- 2018: US Ben Guerdane
- 2020–2021: CS Sfaxien
- 2024–2025: ES Zarzis
- * Club domestic league appearances and goals

Anis Boujelbene (Arabic: أنيس بوجلبان; born 6 February 1978) is a Tunisian former footballer who played as a defensive midfielder.

== Transfer to Al Ahly ==
He moved to Al Ahly in January 2007, after guiding his former club CS Sfaxien to the final of the CAF Champions League 2006, before losing out on the title to Al Ahly, his new employers.

His performances in Africa's top club competition earned him a return to the Tunisian national side after a four-year absence, his contribution having been noticed by Tunisian coach Roger Lemerre.

Boujelbene had been nominated for the title of best Tunisian player in the past. He led CS Sfaxien to win 6 titles during his captaincy.

== Honours ==
with Al Ahly:

- Winner of CAF Super Cup 2007.
- Winner of CAF Champions League 2008.

== Manager ==
He has managed US Ben Guerdane and CS Sfaxien.
