= James Nanor =

Ghanaian footballer

Personal information
- Full name: James Tetteh Nanor
- Date of birth: 12 August 1976 (age 50)
- Height: 1.80 m (5 ft 11 in)
- Position: Goalkeeper

Senior career*
Years	Team	Apps	(Gls)
1992–1994	Afienya United		
1997–2004	Hearts of Oak		

International career
1994–2001	Ghana	10	(0)
- * Club domestic league appearances and goals

James Tetteh Nanor (born 12 August 1976) is a Ghanaian former professional footballer who played as a goalkeeper and currently serves as goalkeepers coach.

== Club career ==
Nanor played in Ghana for Afienya United and Hearts of Oak. He won the Ghana Premier League six times and the Ghanaian FA Cup twice with Hearts of Oak.

== International career ==
Nanor was capped for Ghana, and was a squad member in the 2002 Africa Cup of Nations. In December 1999, Nanor was suspended by CAF for one year after spitting on a referee during a 1999 CAF Champions League group stage match.

== Coaching career ==
Nanor became a goalkeepers coach when he retired from football. In August 2014, he was appointed as the goalkeepers coach for Tema-based side International Allies.

== Honours ==
Hearts of Oak

- Ghana Premier League: 1997–98, 1999, 2000, 2001, 2002, 2004
- Ghanaian FA Cup: 1999, 2000
- Ghana Super Cup: 1997, 1998
