= 2003 Arab Unified Club Championship final =

- Event: 2003 Arab Unified Club Championship
Zamalek	Kuwait SC
(Egypt)	(Kuwait)
2	1
- Date: 20 July 2003
- Venue: Cairo Stadium, Cairo
- Referee: Jasem Al-Hail (Qatar)

The Arab Unified Club Championship final, also known as the 2003 Prince Faisal bin Fahd Tournament for Arab Clubs final, was the 19th final of the UAFA Club Cup, and the second since the Arab Club Champions Cup and the Arab Cup Winners' Cup were unified. The match took place on 20 July 2003, at Cairo Stadium in Cairo, Egypt, between Zamalek from Egypt, and Kuwait SC from Kuwait, Zamalek won the match 2–1 and earning their first (and only) UAFA Club Cup title.

== Match details ==
20 July 2003
20:00 UTC+2

Zamalek (Egypt)	2–1	Kuwait SC
Saleh 23'; Mahmoud 58'		Oliveira 88'

Cairo Stadium
Referee: Jasem Al-Hail (Qatar)

Zamalek	Kuwait SC

Zamalek:
GK	16	(Egypt) Abdel Wahed Al Sayed
RB	2	(Egypt) Ibrahim Hassan
CB	3	(Egypt) Mohamed Sedik
CB	15	(Egypt) Wael El-Quabbani	(substituted off) ?'
CB	5	(Egypt) Besheer El-Tabei
LB	13	(Egypt) Tarek El-Sayed
CM	17	(Egypt) Ahmed Saleh	(substituted off) 46'
CM	20	(Egypt) Tamer Abdel Hamid
CM	16	(Egypt) Tarek El-Said
CF	9	(Egypt) Hossam Hassan	(substituted off) 78'
CF	14	(Egypt) Hazem Emam
Substitutes:
CB		(Egypt) Mahmoud Mahmoud	(substituted on) ?'
CF	23	(Egypt) Abdel Halim Ali	(substituted on) 46'
CF		(Egypt) Sameh Youssef	(substituted on) 78'
Manager:
(Portugal) Nelo Vingada

Kuwait SC:
GK	(Kuwait) Ahmed Jasim
CB	(Kuwait) Yossef Al-Yoha
CB	(Kuwait) Khaled Al-Gar Allah
CB	(Kuwait) Jarrah Al-Ateeqi
RM	(Kuwait) Ahmed Sobaih	(substituted off) ?'
CM	(Kuwait) Waleed Ali	(substituted off) ?'
CM	(Kuwait) Adel Oqla	(substituted off) ?'
LM	(Kuwait) Yaqoub Al-Taher
CM	(Brazil) Fabiano Cabral
CF	(Brazil) Somália
CF	(Brazil) Alessandro Oliveira
Substitutes:
RM	(Kuwait) Abd Allah Saleh	(substituted on) ?'
CM	(Kuwait) Hussein Hakim	(substituted on) ?'
CM	(Kuwait) Nawaf Abd Allah	(substituted on) ?'
Manager:
(Brazil) Giba
