= 2004 Egyptian Super Cup =

2004–05 Egyptian Super Cup
Zamalek	Al Mokawloon Al Arab
2	4
- Date: 10 September 2004
- Venue: Cairo International Stadium, Cairo
- Referee: Reda El-Beltagi (Egypt)

The 2004–05 Egyptian Super Cup was the fourth Egyptian Super Cup, an annual football match contested by the winners of the previous season's Egyptian Premier League and Egypt Cup competitions, Al Mokawloon Al Arab won the game 4–2.

== Match details ==
10 September 2004

Zamalek	2–4	Al Mokawloon Al Arab
Abd El-Hady 17', 44' (pen.)	[[[Category:All articles with unsourced statements]] Report]	Adel 9', 70'; Moharam 22'; Zein 63'

Cairo International Stadium
Referee: Reda El-Beltagi (Egypt)

Zamalek	Al Mokawloon Al Arab

Zamalek:
GK	16	(Egypt) Abd El-Wahed El-Sayed
RB	15	(Egypt) Wael El-Quabbani
CB	1	(Egypt) Medhat Abdel-Hady
CB	3	(Egypt) Mohamed Sedik		(substituted off) 46'
RM	4	(Egypt) Amer Sabry		(substituted off) 38'
CM	27	(Egypt) Moataz Eno	(red card) 67'
CM	19	(Egypt) Tarek El-Said
LM	13	(Egypt) Tarek El-Sayed
AM	14	(Egypt) Hazem Emam (c)		(substituted off) 73'
FW	24	(Egypt) Abd El-Halim Ali
FW	10	(Egypt) Gamal Hamza
Substitutions:
DF	5	(Egypt) Mahmoud Mahmoud		(substituted in) 38'
MF	11	(Egypt) Mohamed Abu El-'Ela		(substituted in) 46'
FW	28	(Egypt) Sameh Youssef		(substituted in) 73'
Manager:
(Germany) Dragoslav Stepanovic

Al Mokawloon Al Arab:
GK	(Egypt) Mohamed El-Aqabawy
RB	(Egypt) Mohamed El Ghanam
CB	(Egypt) Karim Rayan
CB	(Egypt) Khaled Nabil
LB	(Egypt) Ahmed Hossam
CM	(Egypt) Mohamed Ouda
CM	15	(Egypt) Ayman Zein
RW	(Egypt) Ahmed El-Abo	(substituted off) 74'
AM	(Egypt) Talaat Moharam	(substituted off) 80'
LW	(Egypt) Islam Shokry	(substituted off) 51'
CF	(Egypt) Tamer Adel	(red card) 71'
Substitutions:
MF	(Cameroon) Mohamed Bao	(substituted in) 51'
FW	(Egypt) Samir Sabry	(substituted in) 74'
FW	(Egypt) Mohamed Ali	(substituted in) 80'
Manager:
(Egypt) Hassan Shehata

Man of the Match:

Assistant referees:
Azab Haggag
Beshr Besheer

Fourth official:
