= 2001–02 Zamalek SC season =

Zamalek
2001–02 season
- Chairman: (Egypt) Kamal Darwish
- Manager: (Germany) Otto Pfister
- Stadium: Cairo Stadium
- Egyptian Premier League: 3rd
- Egyptian Super Cup: Winners
- Egypt Cup: Winners
- CAF Champions League: Winners
- FIFA Club World Championship: Cancelled
- Top goalscorer: Hossam Hassan (18 goals)
Home colours	Away colours

The 2001–02 season is Zamalek Sports Club 91st season of football since existence in 1911, 47th consecutive season in the Egyptian Premier League, the top flight in the Egyptian football. The club qualified to the 1st edition of the Egyptian Super Cup, also qualified to the 2002 CAF Champions League, as well as represent the CAF at the 2001 FIFA Club World Championship as the first Egyptian team.

== Competitions ==
=== 2001–02 Egyptian Premier League ===
==== Position ====
Pos	Team	Pld	W	D	L	GF	GA	GD	Pts	Qualification
2	Al-Ahly	26	20	4	2	50	17	+33	64	2003 CAF Cup
3	Zamalek	26	16	5	5	58	37	+21	53	2003 CAF Champions League
4	Ghazl El Mahalla	26	9	8	9	28	28	0	35	

Source: http://www.kooora.com/?c=797
Rules for classification: 1) points; 2) goal difference; 3) number of goals scored.

=== 2001 Egyptian Super Cup ===
14 September 2001	Zamalek	2 – 1 (a.e.t.)	Ghazl El Mahalla	Cairo Stadium
	Emam 20'; Hassan 116'		El-Etrawi 77'	Referee: Gamal Al-Ghandour (Egypt)

=== 2001–02 Egypt Cup ===
==== Quarter-finals ====
3 February 2002 1st leg	Mansoura	0 – 2	Zamalek	Mansoura Stadium
			Aboagye 42', 81'	Referee: Naser Abbas (Egypt)

8 February 2002 2nd leg	Zamalek	3 – 0 (5–0 agg.)	Mansoura	Cairo Stadium
				Referee: Mohamed Mostafa (Egypt)

==== Semi-finals ====
6 June 2002 1st leg	Ghazl El Mahalla	0 – 0	Zamalek	Ghazl El Mahalla Stadium

11 June 2002 2nd leg	Zamalek	2 – 1 (2–1 agg.)	Ghazl El Mahalla	Cairo Stadium
	Hassan 2'; Emam 45'		Abdel-Aziz 26' (pen.)	Referee: Mohamed Kamal Helal (Egypt)

==== Final ====
16 June 2002	Zamalek	1 – 0	Baladeyet El-Mahalla	Cairo Stadium
20:30 UTC+2	Ali 60'			Attendance: 50,000; Referee: Essam Abdel-Fatah (Egypt)

=== 2002 CAF Champions League ===
==== First round ====
12 May 2001 1st leg	Zamalek (Egypt)	6 – 0	(Rwanda) APR FC

26 May 2001 2nd leg	APR FC (Rwanda)	0 – 0 (0–6 agg.)	(Egypt) Zamalek

==== Second round ====
12 May 2001 1st leg	Zamalek (Egypt)	2 – 0	(Zambia) Nkana FC

26 May 2001 2nd leg	Nkana FC (Zambia)	1 – 1 (1–3 agg.)	(Egypt) Zamalek

==== Group stage ====
Pos	Team	Pld	W	D	L	GF	GA	GD	Pts	Qualification
1	(Egypt) Zamalek	6	4	1	1	10	3	+7	13	Advance to knockout stage
2	(Ivory Coast) ASEC Mimosas	6	4	0	2	12	6	+6	12	Advance to knockout stage
3	(Tunisia) ES Tunis	6	3	1	2	9	6	+3	10	
4	(Mozambique) Costa do Sol	6	0	0	6	1	17	−16	0	

==== Semi-finals ====
1st Leg	TP Mazembe (Democratic Republic of the Congo)	1 – 1	(Egypt) Zamalek

2nd Leg	Zamalek (Egypt)	2 – 0 (3–1 agg.)	(Democratic Republic of the Congo) TP Mazembe	Cairo International Stadium, Cairo

==== Final ====
30 November 2002 1st Leg	Raja Casablanca (Morocco)	0 – 0	(Egypt) Zamalek	Stade Mohamed V, Casablanca
				Attendance: 60,000; Referee: Falla N'Doye (Senegal)

13 December 2002 2nd Leg	Zamalek (Egypt)	1 – 0 (1–0 agg.)	(Morocco) Raja Casablanca	Cairo International Stadium, Cairo
17:00 GMT	Abdel Hamid 45+4'			Attendance: 67,310; Referee: Al-Shelmani (Libya)

=== 2001 FIFA Club World Championship ===
As winners of the 2000 African Cup Winners' Cup, Zamalek SC was one of the 12 teams that were invited to the 2001 FIFA Club World Championship, which would be hosted in Spain from 28 July to 12 August 2001. However, the tournament was cancelled, primarily due to the collapse of ISL, which was marketing partner of FIFA at the time.

==== Group stage ====
29 July 2001 1	Zamalek (Egypt)	Cancelled	(Australia) Wollongong Wolves	Estadio Riazor, A Coruña

1 August 2001 2	Boca Juniors (Argentina)	Cancelled	(Egypt) Zamalek	Estadio Riazor, A Coruña

4 August 2001 3	Deportivo de La Coruña (Spain)	Cancelled	(Egypt) Zamalek	Estadio Riazor, A Coruña
