= Ibrahim Hassan =

Egyptian footballer (born 1966)

Personal information
- Full name: Ibrahim Hassan Hassanein Hassan
- Date of birth: 10 August 1966 (age 60)
- Place of birth: Helwan, Greater Cairo, Egypt
- Height: 1.78 m (5 ft 10 in)
- Position: Right back

Youth career
- 1975–1984: Al Ahly

Senior career*
Years	Team	Apps	(Gls)
1984–1990	Al Ahly	78	(14)
1990–1991	PAOK	24	(6)
1991–1992	Neuchâtel Xamax	13	(1)
1992–1999	Al Ahly	161	(24)
1999–2000	Al Ain		
2000–2004	Zamalek	61	(12)
2004–2006	Al Masry	47	(4)

International career
1988–2002	Egypt	131	(14)

Managerial career
- 2007–2009: Al Masry (director)
- 2009: Telecom Egypt (director)
- 2009–2011: Zamalek (director)
- 2011: Ismaily (director)
- 2012: Al Masry (director)
- 2013: Misr Lel Makkasa (director)
- 2013–2014: Jordan (assistant)
- 2014: Zamalek (director)
- 2014–2015: Al Ittihad Alexandria (director)
- 2015–2018: Al Masry (director)
- 2018–2019: Pyramids (director)
- 2019–2020: Smouha (director)
- 2020–2022: Al Ittihad Alexandria (director)
- 2022: Al Masry (director)
- 2022–2023: Al Masry (director)
- 2024: Modern Future (director)
- 2024–2026: Egypt (director)
Medal record
Men's football
Representing Egypt
Africa Cup of Nations
Winner	1986 Egypt
Winner	1998 Burkina Faso
African Games
Gold medal – first place	1987 Nairobi
FIFA Arab Cup
Winner	1992 Syria
- * Club domestic league appearances and goals

Ibrahim Hassan Hassanin Hassan is an Egyptian football coach, executive and former player who played as a right back. He was director of the Egypt national team from 2024 to 2026. Hassan has played 131 caps for Egypt, and is considered one of the greatest defenders in African football history. His twin brother Hossam also played professional football, and they shared clubs for most of their extensive careers.

== Club career ==
Born in Cairo, Hassan played professionally for almost twenty years, in a career in which he shared teams with his sibling Hossam for its vast majority. He represented Al Ahly (twice), PAOK, Neuchâtel Xamax, Al Ain SCC, Zamalek SC and Al-Masry, even joining his twin in his overseas spells in Greece, Switzerland and United Arab Emirates. During the 1991–92 UEFA Cup, while playing for Neuchâtel Xamax, he scored the only goal with a direct free kick in a 1–0 victory over Real Madrid in the third round.

In the summer of 2000, Hassan moved to Zamalek, winning three Egyptian Premier League titles (in 2000–01, 2001–02 and 2003–04) with the Cairo giants, in addition to the 2002 Egypt Cup and the Egyptian Super Cup in 2001 and 2002. At the continental level, Hassan won with Zamalek the 2002 CAF Champions League, 2003 CAF Super Cup, 2003 UAFA Club Cup and the 2003 Saudi-Egyptian Super Cup.

Hassan retired at almost 40 years of age, going on to have a spell as assistant manager with former team El-Masry, where his brother would also start his coaching career in 2008. In 2010, after a brief spell as assistant manager with Zamalek, he became the club's director of football.

== International career ==
Hassan played 131 games and scored 14 goals for Egypt over almost 20 years. He appeared for the national team at the 1990 FIFA World Cup, helping it to two draws and a narrow 0–1 defeat against England. His brother was also an undisputed starter, as the pair became the first players from Africa to be selected to FIFA's Century Club. Hassan remains the only Egyptian footballer who made the "FIFA world team" selection (three times) and played in 1990 and 1999 against Bosnia and South Africa respectively.

== Managerial career ==
Hassan accompanied his twin brother Hossam Hassan as director and assistant coach at Al Masry, Telecom Egypt, Zamalek, Ismaily, Misr Lel Makkasa, the Jordan national team, Al Ittihad Alexandria, Pyramids, Smouha, Modern Future, and the Egypt national team, the last of which he became director of in February 2024. In November 2026, Hassan was dismissed from his position as director of the team alongside Hossam from the Egyptian national football team.

== Career statistics ==
=== International ===
Appearances and goals by national team and year
National team	Year	Apps	Goals
Egypt	1988	16	3
Egypt	1989	20	1
Egypt	1990	15	0
Egypt	1991	11	4
Egypt	1992	4	0
Egypt	1993	7	1
Egypt	1994	6	0
Egypt	1995	7	1
Egypt	1996	3	1
Egypt	1997	12	0
Egypt	1998	0	0
Egypt	1999	12	1
Egypt	2000	11	0
Egypt	2001	6	2
Egypt	2002	1	0
Total		131	14

Scores and results list Egypt's goal tally first, score column indicates score after each Hassan goal.

List of international goals scored by Ibrahim Hassan
No.	Date	Venue	Opponent	Score	Result	Competition
1	23 February 1988	?, Dubai, United Arab Emirates	United Arab Emirates	?–?	2–1	Friendly
2	16 November 1988	?, Kuwait City, Kuwait	Kuwait	?–?	2–2	Friendly
3	16 November 1988	?, Kuwait City, Kuwait	Kuwait	?–?	2–2	Friendly
4	14 December 1988	Cairo International Stadium, Cairo, Egypt	Switzerland	1–3	1–3	Friendly
5	26 August 1989	Cairo International Stadium, Cairo, Egypt	Kenya	2–0	2–0	1990 FIFA World Cup qualification
6	14 April 1991	El Menzah Stadium, Tunis, Tunisia	Tunisia	2–1	2–2	1992 Africa Cup of Nations qualification
7	12 July 1991	Cairo International Stadium, Cairo, Egypt	Chad	1–1	5–1	1992 Africa Cup of Nations qualification
8	3 December 1991	Cairo International Stadium, Cairo, Egypt	Poland	2–0	4–0	Friendly
9	23 April 1993	Alexandria Stadium, Alexandria, Egypt	Malawi	1–0	2–0	1994 Africa Cup of Nations qualification
10	14 April 1995	Port Said Stadium, Port Said, Egypt	Tunisia	1–0	1–0	Friendly
11	8 November 1996	Cairo International Stadium, Cairo, Egypt	Namibia	4–1	7–1	1998 FIFA World Cup qualification
12	15 November 1999	Chivas Verde Valle, Guadalajara, Mexico	New Zealand	1–0	1–0	Friendly
13	6 January 2001	Cairo International Stadium, Cairo, Egypt	United Arab Emirates	2–1	2–1	Friendly
14	14 November 2001	Cairo International Stadium, Cairo, Egypt	Libya	1–0	4–0	2002 FIFA World Cup qualification

== Honours ==
=== Club ===
Al Ahly

- Egyptian Premier League: 1984–85, 1985–86, 1986–87, 1988–89, 1993–94, 1994–95, 1995–96, 1996–97, 1997–98, 1998–99
- Egypt Cup: 1984–85, 1988–89, 1992–93, 1995–96
- African Cup of Champions Clubs: 1987
- African Cup Winners' Cup: 1984, 1985, 1986, 1993
- Arab Club Champions Cup: 1996
- Arab Cup Winners' Cup: 1994–95
- Arab Super Cup: 1997, 1998
- Afro-Asian Cup: 1988

Al Ain

- UAE Pro League: 1999–2000

Zamalek

- Egyptian Premier League: 2000–01, 2002–03, 2003–04
- Egypt Cup: 2001–02
- Egyptian Super Cup: 2001, 2002
- CAF Champions League: 2002
- CAF Super Cup: 2003
- Arab Club Champions Cup: 2003
- Saudi-Egyptian Super Cup: 2003

=== International ===
Egypt

- Arab Nations Cup: 1992
- All-Africa Games: 1987

== See also ==
- List of men's footballers with 100 or more international caps
