= 2002–03 Zamalek SC season =

Zamalek SC
2002–03 season
- Chairman: Kamal Darwish
- Manager: Carlos Roberto Cabral
- Stadium: Cairo International Stadium
- Egyptian Premier League: Winners
- Egypt Cup: Quarter-finals
- Egyptian Super Cup: Winners
- CAF Champions League: Winners
- Arab Club Champions Cup: Winners
- Saudi-Egyptian Super Cup: Winners
- Top goalscorer: League: Abdel Halim Ali (10); All: Abdel Halim Ali (10)

The 2002–03 Zamalek SC season was the club's 92nd season in existence and the 44th consecutive season in the top flight of Egyptian football. In addition to the domestic league, Zamalek participated in this season's editions of the Egypt Cup, the Egyptian Super Cup, the CAF Champions League, the Arab Unified Club Championship and the Saudi-Egyptian Super Cup.

== Pre-season and friendlies ==
Win Draw Loss

22 August 2002 Friendly	CS Sfaxien (Tunisia)	3–1	(Egypt) Zamalek	Tunisia
22:00

8 September 2002 Friendly	Al-Wahda (Syria)	0–1	(Egypt) Zamalek	Syria
20:00			Seeka

3 January 2003 Friendly	Zamalek (Egypt)	2–1	(Italy) Lazio	Cairo, Egypt
17:30				Stadium: Cairo International Stadium

== Competitions ==
=== Overall record ===
Competition	First match	Last match	Starting round	Final position	Record							
Competition	First match	Last match	Starting round	Final position	Pld	W	D	L	GF	GA	GD	Win %
Egyptian Premier League	23 September 2002	23 May 2003	Matchday 1	Winners	26	21	4	1	57	10	+47	80.77
Egypt Cup	18 December 2002	21 January 2003	First round	Quarter-finals	5	3	2	0	9	6	+3	60.00
Egyptian Super Cup	19 September 2002		Final	Winners	1	1	0	0	1	0	+1	100.00
CAF Champions League	2 August 2002	13 December 2002	Group stage	Winners	10	6	3	1	14	4	+10	60.00
Arab Unified Club Championship	6 July 2023	20 July 2003	Group stage	Winners	6	4	1	1	10	7	+3	66.67
Saudi-Egyptian Super Cup	24 July 2003		Final	Winners	1	0	1	0	0	0	+0	0.00
Total					49	35	11	3	91	27	+64	71.43

Source: Competitions

=== Egyptian Premier League ===
==== League table ====
Pos	Team	Pld	W	D	L	GF	GA	GD	Pts	Qualification or relegation
1	Zamalek (C)	26	21	4	1	57	10	+47	67	Qualification to Champions League
2	Al Ahly	26	21	3	2	53	13	+40	66	Qualification to Champions League
3	Ismaily	26	13	7	6	35	22	+13	46	Qualification to Confederation Cup
4	ENPPI	26	11	9	6	33	19	+14	42	
5	Sawahel	26	11	8	7	30	21	+9	41	

Source: RSSSF
(C) Champions

==== Results summary ====
Overall								Home						Away					
Pld	W	D	L	GF	GA	GD	Pts	W	D	L	GF	GA	GD	W	D	L	GF	GA	GD
0	0	0	0	0	0	0	0	0	0	0	0	0	0	0	0	0	0	0	0

==== Results by round ====
Round	1	2	3	4	5	6	7	8	9	10	11	12	13	14	15	16	17	18	19	20	21	22	23	24	25	26
Ground	H	A	A	H	A	H	A	H	A	H	A	H	A	A	H	H	A	H	A	H	A	H	A	H	A	H
Result	W	W	W	W	W	D	L	W	D	W	W	W	W	W	W	W	W	W	D	D	W	W	W	W	W	W
Position																										

A = Away; H = Home; W = Win; D = Draw; L = Loss

==== Matches ====
23 September 2002 1	Zamalek	3–0	Al Masry	Cairo
20:00 EST (UTC+2)				Stadium: Cairo International Stadium

27 September 2002 2	Al Ittihad	0–1	Zamalek	Alexandria
17:45 EST (UTC+2)				Stadium: Alexandria Stadium

10 October 2002 3	Tersana	0–2	Zamalek	Cairo
14:45 EST (UTC+2)

24 October 2002 5	Baladeyet El Mahalla	0–1	Zamalek	El Mahalla El Kubra
17:30 EST (UTC+2)				Stadium: Ghazl El Mahalla Stadium

29 October 2002 4	Zamalek	5–0	Aswan	Cairo
19:30 EST (UTC+2)				Stadium: Cairo International Stadium

8 November 2002 7	Sawahel	2–1	Zamalek	Alexandria
20:30 EST (UTC+2)				Stadium: Alexandria Stadium

26 December 2002 6	Zamalek	1–1	ENPPI	Cairo
14:30 EST (UTC+2)				Stadium: Cairo International Stadium

30 December 2002 11	Goldi	0–2	Zamalek	Cairo
14:30 EST (UTC+2)

7 January 2003 12	Zamalek	3–0	Ghazl El Mahalla	Cairo
14:30 EST (UTC+2)				Stadium: Cairo International Stadium

11 January 2003 13	Ismaily	1–3	Zamalek	Ismailia
14:30 EST (UTC+2)				Stadium: Ismailia Stadium

25 January 2003 8	Zamalek	3–0	El Mansoura	Cairo
14:30 EST (UTC+2)				Stadium: Cairo International Stadium

30 January 2003 9	Al Ahly	2–2	Zamalek	Cairo
17:00 EST (UTC+2)				Stadium: Cairo International Stadium

3 February 2003 14	Al Masry	0–1	Zamalek	Port Said
14:45 EST (UTC+2)				Stadium: Al Masry Club Stadium

16 February 2003 16	Zamalek	2–0	Tersana	Cairo
14:45 EST (UTC+2)				Stadium: Cairo International Stadium

20 February 2003 17	Aswan	0–3	Zamalek	Aswan
14:45 EST (UTC+2)				Stadium: Aswan Stadium

24 February 2003 10	Zamalek	2–0	Al Mokawloon Al Arab	Cairo
14:45 EST (UTC+2)				Stadium: Cairo International Stadium

28 February 2003 18	Zamalek	2–0	Baladeyet El Mahalla	Cairo
14:45 EST (UTC+2)				Stadium: Cairo International Stadium

4 March 2003 19	ENPPI	0–0	Zamalek	Cairo
18:00 EST (UTC+2)

8 March 2003 20	Zamalek	1–1	Sawahel	Cairo
18:00 EST (UTC+2)				Stadium: Cairo International Stadium

13 March 2003 21	El Mansoura	0–1	Zamalek	Mansoura
18:00 EST (UTC+2)

17 March 2003 15	Zamalek	5–0	Al Ittihad	Cairo
18:00 EST (UTC+2)				Stadium: Cairo International Stadium

19 April 2003 22	Zamalek	3–1	Al Ahly	Cairo
19:00 EST (UTC+2)				Stadium: Cairo International Stadium

4 May 2003 23	Al Mokawloon Al Arab	0–3	Zamalek	Cairo
17:00 EST (UTC+2)

8 May 2003 24	Zamalek	4–2	Goldi	Cairo
17:00 EST (UTC+2)				Stadium: Cairo International Stadium

12 May 2003 25	Ghazl El Mahalla	0–3	Zamalek	El Mahalla El Kubra
17:00 EST (UTC+2)				Stadium: Ghazl El Mahalla Stadium

23 May 2003 26	Zamalek	1–0	Ismaily	Cairo
17:00 EST (UTC+2)				Stadium: Cairo International Stadium

=== Egypt Cup ===
18 December 2002 First round First leg	Zamalek	0–0	Banha	Cairo
14:30 EST (UTC+2)				Stadium: Cairo International Stadium

22 December 2002 First round Second leg	Banha	2–3 (2–3 agg.)	Zamalek	Banha
13:30 EST (UTC+2)

16 January 2003 Second round First leg	Zamalek	1–0	Ghazl El Mahalla	Cairo
14:30 EST (UTC+2)				Stadium: Cairo International Stadium

21 January 2003 Second round Second leg	Ghazl El Mahalla	2–3 (2–4 agg.)	Zamalek	El Mahalla El Kubra
14:00 EST (UTC+2)				Stadium: Ghazl El Mahalla Stadium

26 May 2003 Quarter-finals	Zamalek	2–2 (a.e.t.) (2–4 p)	Goldi	Alexandria
20:00 EST (UTC+2)	Abdel Razek 76'; Emam 91' (pen.)		Amin 52'; Aboul Dahab 120'	Stadium: Alexandria Stadium

=== Arab Unified Club Championship ===
==== Group stage ====
The draw for the group stage was held on 6 June 2003.

6 July 2003 1	Zamalek (Egypt)	1–0	(Syria) Al-Jaish	Cairo, Egypt
EST (UTC+2)				Stadium: Cairo International Stadium

8 July 2003 2	Zamalek (Egypt)	1–1	(Algeria) USM Alger	Cairo, Egypt
21:00 EST (UTC+2)	El-Said 43' (pen.)		Ouichaoui 15'	Stadium: El Sekka El Hadid Stadium; Referee: Farid Ali (United Arab Emirates)

13 July 2003 3	Zamalek (Egypt)	2–1	(Iraq) Al-Shorta	Cairo, Egypt
EST (UTC+2)				Stadium: Cairo International Stadium

15 July 2003 4	Zamalek (Egypt)	1–3	Kuwait	Cairo, Egypt
EST (UTC+2)				Stadium: Cairo International Stadium

==== Knockout stage ====
18 July 2003 Semi-finals	Al-Ettifaq (Saudi Arabia)	1–3 (a.e.t.)	(Egypt) Zamalek	Cairo, Egypt
EST (UTC+2)	Masambe 45'		Youssef 77'; Ali 105', 114'	Stadium: Cairo International Stadium

20 July 2003 Final	Zamalek (Egypt)	2–1	Kuwait	Cairo, Egypt
20:00 EST (UTC+2)	Saleh 23'; Mahmoud 58'		Oliveira 88'	Stadium: Cairo International Stadium; Referee: Jasem Al-Hail (Qatar)
