= 2000–01 Zamalek SC season =

Zamalek
2000–01 season
- Chairman: (Egypt) Kamal Darwish
- Manager: (Germany) Otto Pfister
- Stadium: Cairo Stadium
- Egyptian Premier League: Champions
- Egypt Cup: Round of 16
- African Cup Winners' Cup: Quarter-Finals
- CAF Super Cup: Runner-up
- Arab Cup Winners' Cup: Withdrew
- Top goalscorer: League: Tarek El-Said (13 goals); All: Tarek El-Said (? goals)
Home colours	Away colours

The 2000–01 season is Zamalek Sports Club 90th season of football since existence in 1911, 46th consecutive season in the Egyptian Premier League, the top flight in the Egyptian football. The club qualified to the 2001 African Cup Winners' Cup as the defending champions, earned the right to participate in the 2001 CAF Super Cup against Hearts of Oak; the winner of the 2000 CAF Champions League.

== Staff ==
=== Board of directors ===
Position	Name
President	(Egypt) Kamal Darwish
Vice-president	(Egypt) Abdel-Aziz Qabeil
Treasurer	(Egypt) Mahmoud Badr El-Dein
Board member	(Egypt) Hanafy Riad
Board member	(Egypt) Magdy Sharaf
Board member	(Egypt) Ismail Sleem
Board member	(Egypt) Azmy Mogahaid
Board member	(Egypt) Mohamed Abel-Rahman Fawzy

=== Coaching staff ===
Position	Name
First-team Manager	(Germany) Otto Pfister
General Manager	(Egypt) Helmy Toulan
General Manager	(Egypt) Ashraf Kasem
Assistant Manager	(Egypt) Ahmed Ramzy

== Pre-season ==
=== 2000 Arab Cup Winners' Cup qualifying round ===
==== Zone 2 (Red Sea) ====
Team	Pld	W	D	L	GF	GA	GD	Pts
(Egypt) Zamalek SC	2	2	0	0	3	1	+2	6
(Saudi Arabia) Al-Nassr	2	1	0	1	2	2	0	3
(Sudan) Al-Merrikh	2	0	0	2	2	4	−2	0 (Note: Zamalek SC & Al-Nassr advanced to the final tournament. However Zamalek withdrew, Al-Merrikh admitted instead.)

Notes:

27 August 2000 2	Zamalek (Egypt)	2 – 1	(Sudan) Al-Merrikh	Cairo Stadium
	H. Hassan (?); I. Hassan (?)		(?)

29 August 2000 3	Zamalek (Egypt)	1 – 0	(Saudi Arabia) Al-Nassr	Cairo Stadium

== Competitions ==
=== 2000–01 Egyptian Premier League ===
==== Position ====
Pos	Team	Pld	W	D	L	GF	GA	GD	Pts	Qualification or relegation
1	Zamalek SC	26	20	5	1	54	18	+36	65	2002 CAF Champions League
2	Al-Ahly	26	17	6	3	42	17	+25	57	2002 CAF Champions League
3	Al-Masry	26	11	13	2	36	17	+19	46	2002 CAF Cup

Source: http://www.kooora.com/?c=1584
Rules for classification: 1) points; 2) goal difference; 3) number of goals scored.

=== 2000–01 Egypt Cup ===
==== First round ====
23 February 2001	Zamalek	1 – 0	Asmant Assiut	Cairo Stadium
	El-Doumany 88'

==== Round of 16 ====
8 March 2001 1st leg	El Qanah	3 – 2	Zamalek	Suez Canal Stadium
				Referee: G. El Ghandour

20 March 2001 2nd leg	Zamalek	3 – 2 (5 – 5 agg.) (2–4 p)	El Qanah	Cairo Stadium

=== 2001 African Cup Winners' Cup ===
==== First round ====
3 April 2001 1st leg	Al-Hilal Club (Sudan)	0 – 1	(Egypt) Zamalek	Al Hilal Stadium

14 April 2001 2nd leg	Zamalek (Egypt)	1 – 0 (2 – 0 agg.)	(Sudan) Al-Hilal Club	Cairo Stadium
				Referee: Touati Djaballah (Algeria)

==== Second round ====
12 May 2001 1st leg	Zamalek (Egypt)	2 – 0	(Zambia) Nkana FC

26 May 2001 2nd leg	Nkana FC (Zambia)	2 – 2 (2 – 4 agg.)	(Egypt) Zamalek

==== Quarter-finals ====
7 September 2001 1st leg	Zamalek (Egypt)	1 – 0	(Tunisia) Club Africain	Cairo Stadium

21 September 2001 2nd leg	Club Africain (Tunisia)	3 – 1 (3 – 2 agg.)	(Egypt) Zamalek	Stade Olympique d'El Menzah
				Referee: Kamel Bargar (Algeria)

=== 2001 CAF Super Cup ===
11 February 2001	Hearts of Oak (Ghana)	2 – 0	(Egypt) Zamalek	Kumasi Sports Stadium
	Taylor 11'; Osei Kuffour 46'	Report		Attendance: 25,000; Referee: Felix Tangawarima (Zimbabwe)
