= Ahmed Samir (footballer, born 1981) =

Egyptian footballer

Personal information
- Full name: Ahmed Samir Abdel Moneim Aboual Amaim
- Date of birth: 3 October 1981 (age 45)
- Place of birth: El-Mahalla, Egypt
- Height: 1.77 m (5 ft 10 in)
- Position: Right back

Team information
- Current team: Zamalek (Assistant coach)

Youth career
- 1997–2000: Baladeyet

Senior career*
Years	Team	Apps	(Gls)
2000–2001	Baladeyet		
2001–2004	Zamalek		
2004–2008	Haras El-Hadod		
2008–2010	Lierse	45	(6)
2010–2014	Zamalek	32	(5)
2014–2015	Al Masry	12	(3)

International career
2008	Egypt		

Managerial career
- 2016: Smouha (assistant)
- 2018: Al Mokawloon (assistant)
- 2025–: Zamalek (assistant coach)
- * Club domestic league appearances and goals

Ahmed Samir Abdel Moneim Aboual Amaim (Arabic: أحمد سمير عبد المنعم أبو الأمايم; born 3 October 1981) is an Egyptian retired footballer. He is currently working assistant coach for Zamalek SC.

== Career ==
In January 2008, Samir joined Lierse from Egyptian team Haras El-Hodood. Samir was given the shirt number 10. He quickly established himself in Lierse's first team and effectively contributed to Lierse promotion to the Belgian First Division in 2009–10 season.

== Honours ==
Zamalek

- Egyptian Premier League: 2002–03, 2003–04
- Egypt Cup: 2002, 2013, 2014
- Egyptian Super Cup: 2001, 2002
- CAF Champions League: 2002
- CAF Super Cup: 2003
- Arab Club Champions Cup: 2003
- Saudi-Egyptian Super Cup: 2003
