= Walid Salah Abdel-Latif =

Egyptian footballer (born 1977)

Walid Salah
Personal information
- Full name: Walid Salah Abdel Latif
- Date of birth: 11 November 1977 (age 48)
- Place of birth: Mansoura, Egypt
- Height: 1.85 m (6 ft 1 in)
- Position: Forward

Youth career
- –: El-Mansoura

Senior career*
Years	Team	Apps	(Gls)
1996–2000	El Mansoura SC	–	(–)
2000–2007	Zamalek	73	(18)
2007–2008	Ismaily	3	(1)

International career
1997–2002	Egypt	16	(3)
- * Club domestic league appearances and goals

Walid Salah Abdel Latif Arabic: وليد صلاح عبد اللطيف (born 11 November 1977) is a retired Egyptian football player and a Zamalek international forward.

== Career statistics ==
=== International goals ===
#	Date	Venue	Opponent	Score	Result	Competition
1.	23 April 2000	Alexandria Stadium, Alexandria, Egypt	Mauritius	4–2	Win	2002 World Cup qualification
2.	17 June 2000	Cairo International Stadium, Cairo, Egypt	Ghana	2–0	Win	Friendly
3.	19 March 2001	Cairo International Stadium, Cairo, Egypt	Estonia	3–3	Draw	Friendly
Correct as of 13 January 2017

== Honours ==
Zamalek

- Egyptian Premier League: 2000–01, 2002–03, 2003–04
- Egypt Cup: 2001–02
- Egyptian Super Cup: 2001, 2002
- CAF Champions League: 2002
- CAF Super Cup: 2003
- Arab Club Champions Cup: 2003
- Saudi-Egyptian Super Cup: 2003

Egypt

- Africa Cup of Nations: 1998
