= Hossam Hassan =

Egyptian football manager (born 1966)

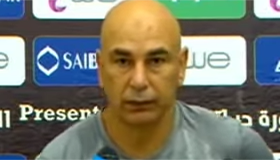
- Hassan in 2018

Personal information
- Full name: Hossam Hassan Hassanin Hassan
- Date of birth: 10 August 1966 (age 60)
- Place of birth: Helwan, Cairo, Egypt
- Height: 1.78 m (5 ft 10 in)
- Position: Striker

Youth career
- 1975–1984: Al Ahly

Senior career*
Years	Team	Apps	(Gls)
1984–1990	Al Ahly	78	(31)
1990–1991	PAOK	19	(5)
1991–1992	Neuchâtel Xamax	8	(3)
1992–1999	Al Ahly	153	(78)
1999–2000	Al Ain	10	(3)
2000–2004	Zamalek	61	(38)
2004–2006	Al Masry	47	(15)
2006–2007	Tersana	21	(6)
2007–2008	Al Ittihad Alexandria	5	(0)
Total		402	(179)

International career
1985–2006	Egypt	177	(69)

Managerial career
- 2008: Al Masry
- 2009: Telecom Egypt
- 2009–2011: Zamalek
- 2011: Ismaily
- 2012: Al Masry
- 2013: Misr Lel Makkasa
- 2013–2014: Jordan
- 2014: Zamalek
- 2014–2015: Al Ittihad Alexandria
- 2015–2018: Al Masry
- 2018–2019: Pyramids
- 2019–2020: Smouha
- 2020–2022: Al Ittihad Alexandria
- 2022: Al Masry
- 2022–2023: Al Masry
- 2024: Modern Future
- 2024–2026: Egypt
Medal record
Men's football
Representing Egypt
Africa Cup of Nations
Winner	1986 Egypt
Winner	1998 Burkina Faso
Winner	2006 Egypt
African Games
Gold medal – first place	1987 Nairobi
FIFA Arab Cup
Winner	1992 Syria
- * Club domestic league appearances and goals

Hossam Hassan Hassanin Hassan (born 10 August 1966) is an Egyptian professional football manager and former player who played as a striker. He was most recently the manager of the Egypt national football team. Hassan is second in Egypt's all-time top scorers list with 69 goals in 177 appearances. His twin brother Ibrahim also played professional football, and they shared teams for most of their extensive careers.

Hassan represented the national team in the 1990 FIFA World Cup and seven Africa Cup of Nations tournaments. He is regarded as one of the best players in African football history and is the 15th most capped player in men's international football. A prolific scorer, he is 2nd in the list of the Egyptian Premier League's all-time top scorers. Hassan is considered one of Egypt's best players of all time.

== Club career ==
Other than two spells abroad in Switzerland and Greece, Hassan played mainly for his hometown's and Africa's most decorated team, Al Ahly SC of Cairo, for which he made his first-team debut aged 18; he played his last match for the club sixteen years later. He ranked first in the club in several categories and won a total of 25 titles with it, including 11 leagues; he was one of only two players ever to find the net in derbies for each team. During his spell at Neuchâtel Xamax in Switzerland he is best remembered for scoring four goals in one game against Celtic in the 1991–92 UEFA Cup. In 2000, already at 34, Hassan left Al-Ahly, going to represent Al Ain SCC.

In the summer of 2000, Hassan moved to Zamalek, winning three Egyptian Premier League titles (in 2000–01, 2001–02 and 2003–04) with the Cairo giants, in addition to the 2002 Egypt Cup and the Egyptian Super Cup in 2001 and 2002. At the continental level, Hassan won with Zamalek the 2002 CAF Champions League, 2003 CAF Super Cup, 2003 UAFA Club Cup and the 2003 Saudi-Egyptian Super Cup. He scored four goals for his team in the Cairo derby, and scored 50 goals for Zamalek in all competitions. Afterwards, he moved in 2004 to Al Masry SC, Tersana and Al-Ittihad Al-Sakndary respectively, while continuing to score at length. He retired aged almost 42, having played most of the time with his sibling Ibrahim, including abroad.

== International career ==
Early in his career, Hassan, 20, was part of the team that won the 1986 Africa Cup of Nations in Egypt, while not in the starting lineup, he won his first African trophy with his country. He appeared for the nation at the 1990 FIFA World Cup, helping the Pharaohs achieve two draws while narrowly going down 0–1 to England. Ibrahim was also an undisputed starter. In 1992, Hassan won with Egypt the 1992 FIFA Arab Cup, scoring the winning goal in the final against Saudi Arabia. Hassan also represented the Pharaohs in seven Africa Cup of Nations tournaments. He finished as the joint-top scorer of the 1998 edition in Burkina Faso with 7 goals, leading Egypt to their fourth title, including a memorable hat-trick against Zambia and a crucial brace in the semi-finals against Burkina Faso.

In 2000, Hassan led Egypt at the 2000 Africa Cup of Nations, finishing as the team's top scorer with three goals. He scored against Zambia, Senegal, and Burkina Faso, helping the Pharaohs top their group before suffering a quarter-final exit. In 2001, FIFA officially recognised Hassan as the world's most-capped international male player at the time. He was honoured by FIFA President Sepp Blatter in Cairo with the "World Dean of Players" armband. Aged 40, Hassan was captain of the national team at the 2006 Africa Cup of Nations, and played three times and netted once for the hosts, winning the last of his three continental competitions. Hassan was Egypt's all-time leading goalscorer, having scored 69 goals in 177 international appearances between 1985 and 2006, until Mohamed Salah scored his 70th goal for the Pharaohs on 13 November 2026.

== Coaching career ==
On 29 February 2008, Hassan was appointed both general manager and head coach of his former club Al Masry. He was later dismissed following a 2–0 defeat to JSM Béjaïa in the 2008 North African Cup Winners Cup, during which he assaulted the fourth official and made offensive gestures toward the Algerian crowd. In 2009, he was appointed head coach of Itesalat. After the sacking of French coach Henri Michel, he was named manager of former side Zamalek, on 30 November 2009. his first match in charge was on 3 December, which ended in a controversial 1–2 away loss against Haras El Hodood, as opposing player Ahmed Eid Abdel Malek was not supposed to play in that match, having been sent off the previous one (Abdel Malek ended up playing, and scored Hodood's first goal).

Hassan's first win at Zamalek came on the 12th, against Al-Masry (3–0). In twelve matches he took the club from 14th place to second, only losing one game and drawing another. He later had short spells with Ismaily, Al Masry and Misr Lel Makkasa. He then became the head coach of Jordan, where he led the team during the 2014 FIFA World Cup qualification, including the AFC fifth round against Uzbekistan, then at the AFC–CONMEBOL play-off against Uruguay. Later on, he returned to Egypt to coach Zamalek, Al Ittihad Alexandria, then Al Masry from 2015 to 2018, where he reached the 2017 Egypt Cup Final, and semi-final of the 2018 CAF Confederation Cup. Afterwards, he managed Pyramids and Smouha, before returning to coach Al Ittihad Alexandria in October 2020.

Due to undisclosed reasons, he parted ways with Al-Ittihad Alexandria, then returned for the 4th time to Al-Masry on 30 May 2022. After leaving the club by the end of the season, Hassan returned to Al-Masry for a 5th tenure in December 2022. In May 2023, he was dismissed after insulting board members during a match against Aswan. A few days following his appointment as head coach of Modern Future, Hassan was released to become the manager of the Egyptian national team in February 2024.

Hassan's first major tournament with Egypt came at the 2025 Africa Cup of Nations in Morocco, where he guided the team to the semi-finals. He then led Egypt to the knockout stage of the 2026 FIFA World Cup for the first time in the nation's history. Egypt were eliminated in the Round of 16 by defending champions Argentina, losing 3–2 after an Egyptian disallowed goal and surrendering a two-goal lead. He criticized the officiating by referee François Letexier and vowed to not watch another match of this World Cup. He subsequently renewed his contract with the national team until 2030.

On 7 November 2026, the Egyptian Football Association (EFA) officially dismissed Hossam Hassan and appointed Ali Maher as the new head coach of the Egyptian national football team. The EFA cited recent circumstances, fallout, and negative impacts on the national team's stability and image. Hassan's departure follows a series of off-field controversies, including an indefinite media ban issued by Egypt's Supreme Council for Media Regulation on 4 November, over public family disputes, as well as a three-match FIFA touchline suspension stemming from Egypt's 2026 World Cup Round of 16 exit against Argentina.

== Personal life ==
=== Relationships ===
Hassan's first marriage was to Howaida El Gharbawy, with whom he had three children. In 2015, Hassan married Dina Moustafa, known as Dan Adam, with whom he had two children. In August 2026, reports said a family altercation involving his wife and Hassan's former family occurred at Porto Marina. The incident reportedly became physical, with both women sustaining minor injuries, while Hassan fainted while attempting to intervene, after which he divorced his first wife.

=== Activism ===
Hassan openly supported longtime president Hosni Mubarak during the 2011 Egyptian revolution. He, along with his twin brother Ibrahim, led marches in support of Mubarak.

Following Egypt's win over Australia in the 2026 FIFA World Cup, Hassan displayed a Palestinian flag and expressed his support for the Palestinian people, calling for respect for their right to live and emphasizing that humanitarian concerns should transcend nationality, religion, or politics.

== Career statistics ==
=== Club ===
As of 29 March 2012

Appearances and goals by club, season and competition
Club	Season	League			National cup		Continental		Other		Total	
Club	Season	Division	Apps	Goals	Apps	Goals	Apps	Goals	Apps	Goals	Apps	Goals
Al Ahly	1984–85	Egyptian Premier League	2	0	3	0	—		—		5	0
Al Ahly	1985–86	Egyptian Premier League	17	6	0	0	7	3	—		24	9
Al Ahly	1986–87	Egyptian Premier League	18	4	0	0	8	1	—		26	5
Al Ahly	1987–88	Egyptian Premier League	18	9	0	0	2	2	—		20	11
Al Ahly	1988–89	Egyptian Premier League	18	10	5	2	0	0	—		23	12
Al Ahly	1989–90	Egyptian Premier League	5	2	0	0	0	0	—		5	2
Al Ahly	1990–91	Egyptian Premier League	0	0	0	0	1	2	—		1	2
Al Ahly	Total		78	31	8	2	18	8	—		107	41
PAOK	1990–91	Alpha Ethniki	19	5	2	1	0	0	—		21	6
Neuchâtel Xamax	1991–92	Nationalliga A	8	3	0	0	3 (Note: Appearances in UEFA Cup)	4	—		11	7
Al Ahly	1992–93	Egyptian Premier League	25	15	2	0	10	2	—		37	17
Al Ahly	1993–94	Egyptian Premier League	10	4	0	0	1	0	—		11	4
Al Ahly	1994–95	Egyptian Premier League	18	7	0	0	0	0	4	1	22	8
Al Ahly	1995–96	Egyptian Premier League	18	11	6	5	0	0	1	1	25	17
Al Ahly	1996–97	Egyptian Premier League	26	14	1	0	0	0	4	1	31	15
Al Ahly	1997–98	Egyptian Premier League	26	9	0	0	0	0	—		26	9
Al Ahly	1998–99	Egyptian Premier League	24	15	1	0	1	1	4	0	30	16
Al Ahly	1999–2000	Egyptian Premier League	6	3	0	0	6	6	0	0	12	9
Al Ahly	Total		153	78	10	5	18	9	13	3	194	96
Al Ain	1999–2000	UAE Football League	10	3	0	0	—		—		10	3
Zamalek	2000–01	Egyptian Premier League	16	7	1	0	7 (Note: Appearances in African Cup Winners' Cup)	3	3 (Note: One appearance in CAF Super Cup, two appearances and three goals in Arab Cup Winners' Cup)	3	27	13
Zamalek	2001–02	Egyptian Premier League	21	18	3	1	13 (Note: Appearances in CAF Champions League)	6	1 (Note: Appearance in Egyptian Super Cup)	1	38	26
Zamalek	2002–03	Egyptian Premier League	15	9	3	1	2	1	6 (Note: Appearances in Arab Club Champions Cup)	1	26	12
Zamalek	2003–04	Egyptian Premier League	9	4	0	0	1	0	6	0	16	4
Zamalek	Total		61	38	7	2	23	10	19	7	110	57
Al Masry	2004–05	Egyptian Premier League	25	10	6	3	—		—		31	13
Al Masry	2005–06	Egyptian Premier League	22	5	0	0	—		—		22	5
Al Masry	Total		47	15	6	3	—		—		53	18
Tersana	2006–07	Egyptian Premier League	20	6	1	0	—		—		21	6
Al Ittihad Alexandria	2007–08	Egyptian Premier League	5	0	0	0	—		—		5	0
Career total			401	179	34	13	62	31	32	10	531	238

^{1}Played in CAF Champions League, CAF Winners' Cup, CAF Super Cup and UEFA Cup/UEFA Europa League.
^{2}Includes other competitive competitions, including the Egyptian Super Cup, Arab Champions League, Arab Cup Winners' Cup, Arab Super Cup, Saudi-Egyptian Super Cup and Afro-Asian Cup.

=== International ===
Appearances and goals by national team and year
National team	Year	Apps	Goals
Egypt	1985	1	0
Egypt	1986	2	0
Egypt	1987	6	0
Egypt	1988	13	2
Egypt	1989	18	6
Egypt	1990	14	3
Egypt	1991	10	4
Egypt	1992	12	4
Egypt	1993	9	4
Egypt	1994	8	10
Egypt	1995	4	0
Egypt	1996	5	3
Egypt	1997	18	6
Egypt	1998	16	13
Egypt	1999	6	4
Egypt	2000	16	7
Egypt	2001	8	0
Egypt	2002	3	0
Egypt	2003	0	0
Egypt	2004	3	2
Egypt	2005	1	0
Egypt	2006	4	1
Total		177	69

== Managerial statistics ==
As of match played 7 November 2026

Managerial record by team and tenure
Team	Nat.	From	To	Record					Ref.
Team	Nat.	From	To	G	W	D	L	Win %	Ref.
Al Masry	(Egypt)	29 February 2008	28 December 2008	27	9	11	7	33.33	
Telecom Egypt	(Egypt)	5 March 2009	29 October 2009	9	3	3	3	33.33	
Zamalek	(Egypt)	30 November 2009	13 July 2011	57	33	16	8	57.89	
Ismaily	(Egypt)	9 August 2011	28 September 2011	2	1	0	1	50.00	
Al Masry	(Egypt)	15 January 2012	1 February 2012	3	2	1	0	66.67	
Misr Lel Makkasa	(Egypt)	26 February 2013	28 May 2013	10	1	4	5	10.00	
Jordan	(Jordan)	25 June 2013	30 July 2014	20	9	8	3	45.00	
Zamalek	(Egypt)	30 July 2014	2 October 2014	6	1	2	3	16.67	
Al Ittihad	(Egypt)	27 October 2014	24 July 2015	35	12	13	10	34.29	
Al Masry	(Egypt)	25 July 2015	28 October 2018	140	68	41	31	48.57	
Pyramids	(Egypt)	29 October 2018	25 January 2019	11	6	5	0	54.55	
Smouha	(Egypt)	22 February 2019	12 January 2020	25	9	7	9	36.00	
Al Ittihad	(Egypt)	20 October 2020	19 March 2022	52	17	18	17	32.69	
Al Masry	(Egypt)	30 May 2022	31 August 2022	15	6	6	3	40.00	
Al Masry	(Egypt)	21 December 2022	6 May 2023	22	8	9	5	36.36	
Egypt	(Egypt)	6 February 2024	7 November 2026	39	23	10	6	58.97	
Career Total				477	207	157	113	43.40	

== Honours ==
=== Club ===
Al Ahly

- Egyptian Premier League: 1984–85, 1985–86, 1986–87, 1988–89, 1993–94, 1994–95, 1995–96, 1996–97, 1997–98, 1998–99
- Egypt Cup: 1984–85, 1988–89, 1992–93, 1995–96
- African Cup of Champions Clubs: 1987
- African Cup Winners' Cup: 1984, 1985, 1986, 1993
- Arab Club Champions Cup: 1996
- Arab Cup Winners' Cup: 1994–95
- Arab Super Cup: 1997, 1998
- Afro-Asian Cup: 1988

Al Ain

- UAE Pro League: 1999–2000

Zamalek

- Egyptian Premier League: 2000–01, 2002–03, 2003–04
- Egypt Cup: 2001–02
- Egyptian Super Cup: 2001, 2002
- CAF Champions League: 2002
- CAF Super Cup: 2003
- Arab Club Champions Cup: 2003
- Saudi-Egyptian Super Cup: 2003

=== International ===
Egypt

- African Cup of Nations: 1986, 1998, 2006
- Arab Nations Cup: 1992
- All-Africa Games: 1987

=== Individual ===
- Confederation of African Football: Best African Footballer in the last 50 years
- Egyptian Premier League Top Scorer: 1998–99, 2001–02
- African Cup of Nations Top Scorer: 1998 (shared with Benni McCarthy)
- Al-Ahram Hebdo Award: Player of the Year in Egypt 1998, 1999, 2001

== See also ==
- List of men's footballers with 100 or more international caps
- List of men's footballers with 50 or more international goals
- List of top international men's football goalscorers by country
