= Mohamed Kamouna =

Egyptian footballer (born 1969)

Personal information
- Full name: Mohamed Hassan Abboud (Arabic:محمد حسن عبود)
- Date of birth: 13 June 1969 (age 57)
- Place of birth: Dakahlia, Egypt
- Positions: Right midfielder; center midfielder

Senior career*
Years	Team	Apps	(Gls)
1992–1997	Mansoura		
1997–2003	Zamalek		
2003–2004	Haras El-Hodood		
2004–2006	Shams		

International career
	Egypt	6	

Managerial career
- 2010–: Jazeerat Al-Feel
- * Club domestic league appearances and goals

Mohamed Kamouna (Arabic:محمد كمونة; born 13 June 1969), is a retired Egyptian footballer

== Honours ==
=== Club ===
Zamalek SC

9 Titles with El Zamalek:

- Egyptian Premier League: 2000-01, 2002-03
- Egypt Cup: 1998–99, 2001–02
- Egyptian Super Cup: 2001, 2002
- CAF Champions League: 2002
- African Cup Winners' Cup:2000
- CAF Super Cup: 2003
