= Ali Maher (footballer) =

Egyptian football manager (born 1973)

- Maher in 2026

Personal information
- Date of birth: 3 December 1973 (age 52)
- Place of birth: Cairo, Egypt
- Height: 1.82 m (6 ft 0 in)
- Position: Forward

Team information
- Current team: Egypt (manager)

Youth career
- 1989–1991: Tersana

Senior career*
Years	Team	Apps	(Gls)
1991–1994	Tersana		
1994–1995	Al-Ansar		
1995–2002	Al Ahly		
2003–2004	ENPPI		

International career
1992–1998	Egypt	24	(11)

Managerial career
- 2017–2018: Al Assiouty
- 2018–2018: Smouha
- 2018–2019: ENPPI
- 2020–2021: Al Masry
- 2021–2023: Future
- 2023–2025: Al Masry
- 2025-2026: Ceramica Cleopatra FC
- 2026–: Egypt
- * Club domestic league appearances and goals

Ali Maher (Arabic: عَلِيّ مَاهِر; born 3 December 1973) is an Egyptian football manager and former player who played as a striker, currently the head coach of Egypt.

Maher was a member in Al Ahly squad which won CAF Champions League 2001.

== International career ==
Maher made several appearances for the Egypt national football team, including 1994 FIFA World Cup qualification and 1998 FIFA World Cup qualification matches. He also played for Egypt at the 1996 Africa Cup of Nations in South Africa where he scored a goal against Cameroon in the group stage'.

=== International Goals ===
Scores and results list Egypt's goal tally first.

#	Date	Venue	Opponent	Score	Result	Competition
1.	22 November 1995	Pretoria, South Africa	Zimbabwe	1–0	2–2	Friendly
2.	22 November 1995	Pretoria, South Africa	Zimbabwe	2–2	2–2	Friendly
3.	26 November 1995	Johannesburg, South Africa	Zambia	2–0	3–1	Friendly
4.	26 November 1995	Johannesburg, South Africa	Zambia	3–1	3–1	Friendly
5.	8 January 1996	Ismailia, Egypt	Tunisia	1–0	2–1	Friendly
6.	8 January 1996	Ismailia, Egypt	Tunisia	2–1	2–1	Friendly
7.	18 January 1996	Johannesburg, South Africa	Cameroon	1–1	1–2	1996 Africa Cup of Nations
8.	8 November 1996	Cairo International Stadium, Egypt	Namibia	1–0	7–1	1998 FIFA World Cup qualifier
9.	8 November 1996	Cairo International Stadium, Egypt	Namibia	3–0	7–1	1998 FIFA World Cup qualifier
10.	8 November 1996	Cairo International Stadium, Egypt	Namibia	5–1	7–1	1998 FIFA World Cup qualifier
11.	22 December 1997	Cairo International Stadium, Egypt	Cameroon	2–0	2–0	Friendly

== Managerial career ==
In November 2026, he was appointed as new Egypt national football team head coach replacing Hossam Hassan.

== Managerial statistics ==
As of 17 November 2026

Team	Nat	From	To	Record				
Team	Nat	From	To	G	W	D	L	Win %
Pyramids FC	(Egypt)	1 July 2017	10 May 2018	40	14	14	12	35.00
Smouha SC	(Egypt)	1 July 2018	14 November 2018	16	5	9	2	31.25
ENPPI SC	(Egypt)	30 November 2018	18 October 2019	26	7	10	9	26.92
Al Masry SC	(Egypt)	31 August 2020	3 September 2021	34	15	9	10	44.12
Future FC	(Egypt)	4 September 2021	2023	82	40	24	18	48.78
Al Masry SC	(Egypt)	2023	2026					
Egypt	(Egypt)	7 November 2026	Present	2	1	1	0	50.00
Total				200	82	67	51	41.00

== Titles and honours ==
=== As a player ===
Al Ahly

- Egyptian Premier League: 1995–96, 1996–97, 1997–98, 1998–99, 1999–2000
- Egypt Cup: 1995–96, 2000–01
- CAF Champions League: 2001
- CAF Super Cup: 2002
- Arab Club Champions Cup: 1996
- Arab Super Cup: 1997, 1998

Egypt

- Arab Nations Cup: 1992

Egypt Olympic Team

- All-Africa Games: 1995

=== As a manager ===
Future

- EFA League Cup: 2022
