= Mohamed Aboul Ela =

Egyptian footballer (born 1980)

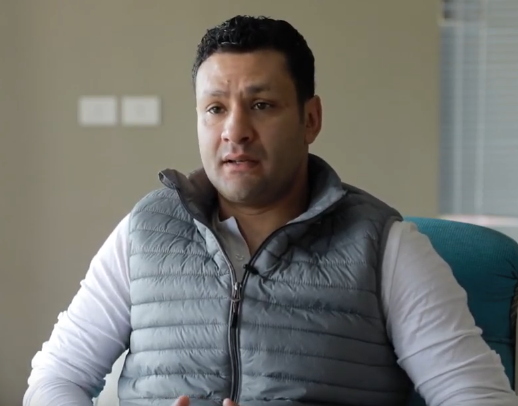

Personal information
- Full name: Mohamed Ahmed Aboul Ela
- Date of birth: 16 January 1980 (age 46)
- Place of birth: Giza, Egypt
- Height: 1.76 m (5 ft 9 1/2 in)
- Positions: Left midfielder; center midfielder

Youth career
- 1988–1999: Zamalek

Senior career*
Years	Team	Apps	(Gls)
1997–2009	Zamalek	153	(9)
2009–2010	El-Entag El-Harby	21	(3)
2010–2012	ENPPI	34	(3)
2012–2013	Wadi Degla SC	11	(0)
2013–2014	El-Entag El-Harby	12	(0)

International career^{‡}
1995–1997	Egypt national under-17 football team		
1997–2001	Egypt national under-20 football team		
2001–2002	Egypt	5	(0)
- * Club domestic league appearances and goals as of 4 March 2017 ‡ National team caps and goals as of 4 March 2017

Mohamed Ahmed Aboul Ela (Arabic: مُحَمَّد أَحْمَد أَبُو الْعَلَا) is an Egyptian football player. The left-footed can play either as a central midfielder or left wingback. Abo Elala was a former Zamalek captain.

== Club career ==
=== Zamalek ===
Mohamed Aboul Ela played for El Zamalek for 21 years; since he was 8 years old until 29.

=== El-Entag El-Harby ===
In summer 2009, Aboul Ela moved to El-Entag El-Harby (aka Military Production) for a one-season contract. He redeemed himself at the newly promoted team in the Premier League and scored 2 goals in the 2009–10 season. By the end of that season, Aboul Ela refused to renew his contract with El-Entag El-Harby.

=== ENPPI ===
On 17 May 2010, ENPPI announced through its official web site the signing of Aboul Ela. He penned a five-season contract.

== Honours ==
=== Club ===
Zamalek

- Egyptian Premier League: 2000–01, 2002–03, 2003–04
- Egypt Cup: 1998–99, 2001–02, 2007–08
- Egyptian Super Cup: 2001, 2002
- CAF Champions League: 2002
- African Cup Winners' Cup: 2000
- CAF Super Cup: 2003
- Afro-Asian Club Championship: 1997
- Arab Champions League: 2003
- Saudi-Egyptian Super Cup: 2003

Enppi

- Egypt Cup: 2010–11

=== International ===
Egypt

- Francophonie Games Bronze Medalist: 2001
- U-17 Africa Cup of Nations: 1997
