= Abdel-Latif El-Doumany =

Egyptian footballer (born 1977)

Abd El-Latif El-Doumany
Personal information
- Date of birth: 14 February 1977 (age 49)
- Place of birth: Dakahlia, Egypt
- Position: Forward

Team information
- Current team: Ghazl El-Mahalla (Head coach)

Senior career*
Years	Team	Apps	(Gls)
1997–1998	Ghazl El-Mahalla		
1998–2002	Zamalek SC		
2002–2003	Haras El-Hodood		
2003–2006	Ghazl El-Mahalla		

International career^{‡}
1998–1999	Egypt	3	(0)

Managerial career
- 2013: Ghazl El-Mahalla (Asst. coach)
- 2013: Ghazl El-Mahalla
- 2015–2016: Zarqa
- 2016: Bani Ebaid
- 2017–: Damietta
- * Club domestic league appearances and goals ‡ National team caps and goals as of 24 October 2014

Abd El-Latif El-Doumany (Arabic: عبد اللطيف الدوماني; born 14 February 1977) is an Egyptian football player who played for Zamalek SC for most of his football career; He also played for Ghazl El-Mahalla and Haras El-Hodood.

== Honours ==
Zamalek

- Egyptian Premier League: 2000–01, 2002–03
- Egypt Cup: 1999–00, 2001–02
- Egyptian Super Cup: 2001, 2002
- African Cup Winners' Cup: 2000
