= Mahmoud Mahmoud =

Egyptian footballer (born 1981)

Personal information
- Full name: Mahmoud Shaaban Mahmoud
- Date of birth: June 13, 1981 (age 45)
- Place of birth: Egypt
- Height: 1.90 m (6 ft 3 in)
- Position: Defender

Team information
- Current team: Minya

Youth career
- Zamalek

Senior career*
Years	Team	Apps	(Gls)
2001–2007	Zamalek	?	(?)
2007–2009	Itesalat	?	(?)
2009	Ittihad El-Shorta	?	(?)
2009–2011	Misr Lel-Makkasa	?	(?)
2012–	Minya	?	(?)

International career^{‡}
2001	Egypt U20		
- * Club domestic league appearances and goals as of 1 July 2006 ‡ National team caps and goals as of 1 July 2006

Mahmoud Shaaban Mahmoud (Arabic: مَحْمُود شَعْبَان مَحْمُود; born June 13, 1981) is an Egyptian footballer. He now plays in the defender position for Minya. He was a member of the Egyptian Olympic Team. Mahmoud played for Egypt at the 2001 FIFA World Youth Championship in Argentina.

== Honours ==
9 For Zamalek

- Egyptian Premier League: 2
  2003, 2004
- Egypt Cup: 1
  2002
- Egyptian Super Cup: 2
  2001, 2002
- CAF Champions League: 1
  2002
- CAF Super Cup: 1
  2003
- Arab Champions Cup: 1
  2003
- Saudi-Egyptian Super Cup : 1
  2003

International

- World Youth Cup Bronze Medalist: 2001
- Francophone Games Bronze Medalist: 2001
- African Youth Cup of Nations 3rd place: 2001
