= Abdel-Wahed El-Sayed =

Egyptian footballer (born 1977)

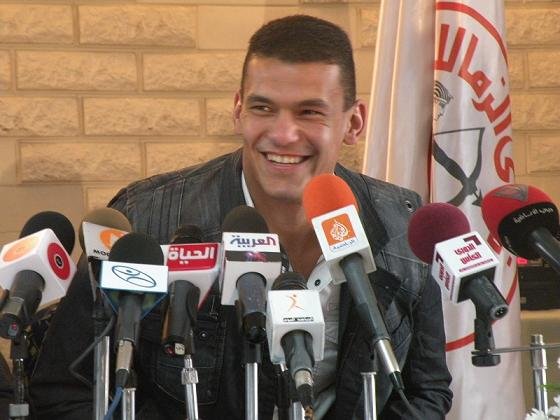

Personal information
- Full name: Abdel-Wahed El-Sayed Abdel-Wahed Masoud
- Date of birth: 3 June 1977 (age 49)
- Place of birth: Tala, Egypt
- Height: 1.85 m (6 ft 1 in)
- Position: Goalkeeper

Youth career
- 1992–1997: Zamalek SC

Senior career*
Years	Team	Apps	(Gls)
1997–2014	Zamalek	504	(0)
2014–2015	Misr Lel Makkasa	12	(0)
Total		516	(2)

International career
2000–2013	Egypt	38	(0)
- * Club domestic league appearances and goals

Abdel-Wahed El-Sayed Abdel-Wahed Masoud (Arabic: عبد الواحد السيد عبد الواحد مسعود; born 3 June 1977) is an Egyptian retired footballer who played as a goalkeeper. He is a former Football Director of Zamalek.

== Honours ==
Zamalek

- Egyptian Premier League: 2000–01, 2002–03, 2003–04
- Egypt Cup: 1999, 2002, 2008, 2013, 2014
- Egyptian Super Cup: 2001, 2002
- CAF Champions League: 2002
- African Cup Winners' Cup: 2000
- CAF Super Cup: 1997, 2003
- Afro-Asian Club Championship: 1997
- Arab Club Championship: 2003
- Egyptian Saudi Super Cup: 2003

Egypt

- African Cup of Nations: 2006, 2010

Individual

- Best Egyptian Goalkeeper in 2003
- Best Goalkeeper in Africa in 2002 CAF Champions League
