= 2002 Egypt Cup final =

- Event: 2001–02 Egypt Cup
| Zamalek | Baladeyet El-Mahalla |
| 1 | 0 |
- Date: 16 June 2002
- Venue: Cairo Stadium, Cairo
- Referee: Essam Abdel-Fatah (Egypt)
- Attendance: 50,000

2002 Egypt Cup final, was the final match of 2001–02 Egypt Cup, when Zamalek played Baladeyet El-Mahalla at Cairo Stadium in Cairo.

Zamalek won the game 1–0, claiming the cup for the 18th time.

== Route to the final ==
| Zamalek | | Round | Baladeyet El-Mahalla |
|---|---|---|---|---|
| Opponent | Result | 2001–02 Egypt Cup | Opponent | Result |
| Bahtim | 3–0, 0–0 (3–0 aggregate) | Round of 32 | Ittiad Shamal Sina | 0–0, 5–1 (5–1 aggregate) |
| Sohag | 3–3, 0–0 (3–3 aggregate) | Round of 16 | Olympi | 1–2, 4–0 (5–2 aggregate) |
| Mansoura | 2–0, 3–0 (5–0 aggregate) | Quarterfinals | Moqaouloun | 3–3, 1–0 (4–3 aggregate) |
| Ghazl | 0–0, 2–1 (2–1 aggregate) | Semi-finals | Ghazl Suez | 4–4, 5–1 (9–5 aggregate) |

== Game description ==
=== Match details ===
16 June 2002
20:30 UTC+2

| Zamalek | 1–0 | Baladeyet El-Mahalla |
|---|---|---|
| Ali 60' | [[[Category:All articles with unsourced statements]] Report] |

Cairo Stadium
Attendance: 50,000
Referee: Essam Abdel-Fatah (Egypt)

| Zamalek | Baladeyet El-Mahalla |

Zamalek:
| GK | 26 | (Egypt) Abdel-Wahed El-Sayed |
| RB | 15 | (Egypt) Wael El-Quabbani |
| CB | 1 | (Egypt) Medhat Abdel-Hady |
| CB | 5 | (Egypt) Besheer El-Tabei | (yellow card) ?' |
| LB | 2 | (Egypt) Ibrahim Hassan |
| CM | 20 | (Egypt) Tamer Abd El-Hamid |
| MF | 11 | (Egypt) Mohamed Abu El-'Ela | | (substituted off) 80' |
| RW | 23 | (Egypt) Mohamed Abdel Wahed |
| AM | 14 | (Egypt) Hazem Emam |
| FW | 27 | (Ghana) Felix Aboagye | | (substituted off) 46' |
| FW | 9 | (Egypt) Hossam Hassan |
Substitutions:
| CM | 4 | (Egypt) Khaled El-Ghandour | | (substituted in) ?' |
| FW | 24 | (Egypt) Abdel Halim Ali | | (substituted in) 46' |
| CM | 13 | (Egypt) Tarek El-Sayed | | (substituted in) 80' |
Manager:
(Germany) Otto Pfister

Baladeyet El-Mahalla:
GK | 1 | (Egypt) Ashraf Abdel-Rashed
RB | (Egypt) Mohamed Sallam | (yellow card) ?'
CB | (Egypt) Sherif El-Desouki
CB | (Egypt) Ramy Hanafy
LB | (Egypt) Basem Wagdy | (yellow card) ?'
CM | (Egypt) Mohamed Gamal | (yellow card) ?'
CM | (Egypt) Abdel-Aziz Ragab | (yellow card) ?'
RW | (Egypt) Ahmed Nakhla
AM | (Egypt) Ahmed Samir
LW | (Egypt) Ahmed Abdel-Ghani
CF | (Egypt) Akram Abdel-Majeed
Substitutions:
CM | (Egypt) Mahmoud Abdel-Razak | (substituted in) ?'
CM | (Egypt) Ahmed Farouk | (substituted in) ?'
Manager:
(Egypt) Abdul-Aziz Abdul-Shafi

Man of the Match:

Assistant referees:

Fourth official:
