= Otto Pfister =

German football manager (born 1937)

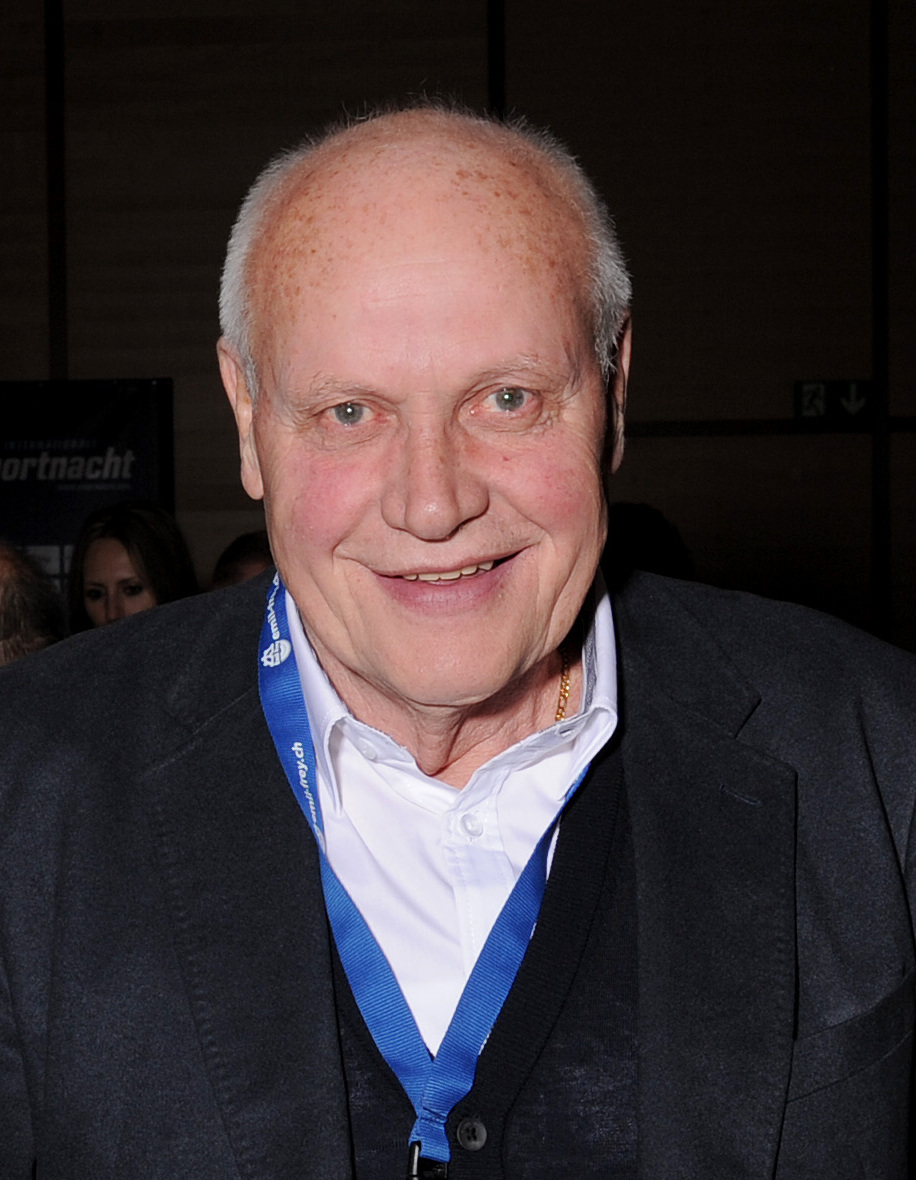
- Pfister in 2013

Personal information
- Position: Striker

Senior career*
Years	Team	Apps	(Gls)
1957–1958	Viktoria Köln		
1958–1959	VfL Köln 99		
1959–1960	Chiasso		
1960–1961	Grenchen		
1961–1963	Vaduz		
1963–1966	St. Gallen		
1966–1968	Nordstern Basel		
1968–1969	Moutier		
1969–1972	Chur 97		

Managerial career
- 1972–1976: Rwanda
- 1976–1978: Upper Volta
- 1979–1982: Senegal
- 1982–1985: Ivory Coast
- 1985–1989: Zaire
- 1992–1993: Ghana
- 1995–1997: Bangladesh
- 1997–1998: Saudi Arabia
- 1998: Saudi Arabia (Olympic)
- 1998–1999: Saudi Arabia
- 1999–2002: Zamalek
- 2002–2004: CS Sfaxien
- 2004–2005: Nejmeh
- 2005: Al Masry
- 2006: Togo
- 2006–2007: Al Merrikh
- 2007–2009: Cameroon
- 2011–2012: Trinidad and Tobago
- 2014: Al Merrikh
- 2015: USM Alger
- 2017–2018: Afghanistan
Medal record
Men's football (as manager)
Representing Ghana
Africa Cup of Nations
Runner-up	1992
FIFA U-17 World Championship
Winner	1991
Representing Cameroon
Africa Cup of Nations
Runner-up	2008 Ghana
Representing Saudi Arabia
FIFA Arab Cup
Winner	1998
Arabian Gulf Cup
Runner-up	1998
Representing Ivory Coast
West African Nations Cup
Bronze medal – third place	1983
ECOWAS Cup
Winner	1983
Representing Senegal
Amílcar Cabral Cup
Runner-up	1982
- * Club domestic league appearances and goals

Otto Martin Pfister is a German former footballer, football manager and one of Germany's most successful coaching exports, voted Africa's Manager of the Year in 1992. He is formerly the manager of the Afghanistan national team.

== Coaching career ==
Pfister has been involved in association football for almost 60 years, he began his coaching career in Switzerland as player-coach in 1961 at the age of just 23. Pfister's early coaching experience was gained with FC Vaduz, FC St. Gallen, FC Nordstern Basel, FC Moutier and finally FC Chur 97. He has worked as head coach for 10 international football teams, eight from Africa and two from Asia. In June 1972, at the age of 34, Pfister retired from his playing days and left Switzerland for Africa, taking the reins as the head coach of Rwanda. Pfister would stay in Africa for 23 years until 1995 working as the head coach for five other African Nations. Upper Volta (now Burkina Faso), Senegal, Ivory Coast, Zaire (now DR Congo) and Ghana. Among his achievements include winning the JVC Fifa U17 Junior World Cup with Ghana in Ital In 1995, Pfister worked inside the Asian Football Confederation (AFC) as the head coach of Bangladesh National Team and also Saudi Arabia from 1997 - 1999. Pfister returned to club football over the following six years with Egyptian team Zamalek, Tunisian club CS Sfaxien, Lebanese club Nejmeh and Egyptian club Al-Masry. Pfister was selected as the head coach of Togo on 18 February 2006, after former coach Stephen Keshi was dismissed from the post despite having secured qualification for their first World Cup Finals. Pfister himself resigned shortly before the team's first match in the tournament, after his players went on strike against the federation over a pay dispute, but he was reappointed three days later after demands from the players. Pfister was appointed manager of Sudanese club Al-Merreikh on 8 September 2006 and would later leave this position on 26 October 2007. The following day Pfister would sign a contract as the head coach of Cameroon taking him through until 2010. As of 24 March 2011 Pfister was unveiled as head coach of Trinidad and Tobago. In February 2014, at the age of 76, he made a return to the head coach of Al-Merreikh, a team he had previously guided to the final of the 2007 CAF Confederation Cup.

=== Burkina Faso ===
Between 1976 and 1978, Pfister changed the face of football in Burkina Faso. They were known as the Upper Volta national football team until 1984, when Upper Volta became Burkina Faso. The establishment in Burkina Faso welcomed the German coach and because of the natural interest in football, the Government's commitment and Pfister's ability, the Burkina Faso national team qualified for their first ever African Cup of Nations in 1978 in Ghana. It was the success with the Burkina team that opened the way for Pfister to traverse Africa, the Middle East, and Asia over the following years since his first landing in Africa.

=== Ivory Coast ===
In 1982, Pfister became coach of the Ivory Coast national team. He repaid his new employers’ confidence in him by taking the country's youth team to the 1983 FIFA World Youth Championship in Mexico. They would not qualify to the quarter-finals, however, Pfister would win the U19 African Cup of Nations with Ivory Coast in 1983.

=== Zaire ===
Pfister took over as head coach of Congo DR national football team (formerly the Zaire national football team) in 1985, where he would spend four years helping to restore the 1974 African champions to their former glories. Pfister was responsible for unleashing a new generation of ‘Leopards’, including Eugene Kabongo, Gaston Mobati, Panguy Merikani and Mutumbile Santos, all of whom took part in the African Cup of Nations 1988.

=== Ghana ===
Pfister led Ghana to a famous win in the 1991 FIFA U-17 World Championship. The Championship was held in the cities of Florence, Montecatini Terme, Viareggio, Massa, Carrara, and Livorno in Italy between 16 and 31 August 1991. Ghana finished second to Spain in their group and progressed to the Quarter-finals where they beat Brazil 2–1 with goals from Mohammed Gargo and Nii Lamptey. After a 0–0 draw with Qatar in the Semi-finals, Ghana won 4–2 in a penalty shoot-out, lining up a final against Spain. On 31 August 1991, Ghana beat Spain 1–0 in the World Cup final in Florence, Ghana's first title.

The Ghana national team qualified for the 1992 African Cup of Nations after finishing top of their qualifying group. Ghana qualified to the Quarter-finals after two 1–0 victories over Egypt and Zambia in the first round of the final tournament. Ghana beat Congo to take them through to the Semi-finals where they beat Nigeria, 2–1. On 26 January 1992 in Senegal, Ghana played Ivory Coast in the final of the African Cup of Nations. After extra time the final score was 0–0 and the game entered penalties. After a marathon penalty shootout, Ivory Coast finally won 11–10 on penalties. The penalty shootout was significant in that it was the first in the final of a major international tournament that every player on the pitch took a penalty.

=== Saudi Arabia ===
Pfister became the head coach of Saudi Arabia in 1997 after previously working in the AFC from 1995 to 1997 with Bangladesh. In 1997, Pfister successfully guided Saudi Arabia to the 1998 FIFA World Cup in France but was crudely released just before the tournament because he requested the Saudi Princes to interfere less in team affairs. After Saudi Arabia lost their opening two games and failed to progress, Carlos Alberto Parreira was fired and Pfister was reinstated as head coach on completion of the tournament. As World Cup Qualifiers, Saudi Arabia automatically qualified for the 1998 Arab Nations Cup. With the help of an impressive 8 goals in 4 games from Obeid Al-Dosari, Saudi Arabia were crowned champions after beating Qatar 3–1 in the final. Despite being the only team not to lose a game, Saudi Arabia also finished as runners-up in the 14th Arabian Gulf Cup in Bahrain.

=== Zamalek ===
Pfister was highly successful during his time at Zamalek SC. During his time as head coach (1999–2002) Pfister won an impressive five trophies. On 10 December 2000, Zamalek recorded a convincing 4–3 aggregate score in the second-leg final against Canon Yaoundé in the African Cup Winners' Cup (now the Confederations Cup). The first time for the Egyptian team. Pfister led Zamalek for their worst defeat against rivals Al Ahly 6–1 on 16 May 2002, Zamalek also reached the final of the CAF Super Cup, losing 2–0 to Accra Hearts of Oak SC.

=== Nejmeh ===
Pfister was appointed as Manager of Nejmeh SC in the Lebanon for the 2004–05 season. After 19 games, Nejmeh were joint top of the 2004–05 Lebanese Premier League with Al-Ansar Club. Both teams needed to win the final match, which incidentally was against each other. The final result was 2–2 and Pfister's Nejmeh were crowned champions as they had a highly superior goal difference. Pfister secured qualification to the 2005 AFC Cup for Nejmeh (which they would eventually finish as runners-up). Pfister also won the Lebanese Super Cup and Lebanese Elite Cup with Nejmeh during the 2004–05 season.

=== Togo ===
Togo lost their opening game of the World Cup, despite having taken the lead against South Korea through a goal by Mohamed Kader. In the second half, Jean-Paul Abalo was sent off after 55 minutes, and goals from Lee Chun-Soo and Ahn Jung-Hwan sealed a 2–1 defeat for Togo. Togo's next opponents in Group G were Switzerland, with the match scheduled for the afternoon of 19 June. However, the Togo squad threatened to refuse to fulfil the fixture and take strike action against unpaid bonuses. FIFA negotiated with the squad on 17 June, persuading them to travel to Dortmund in time to fulfil the fixture; goals from Alexander Frei and Tranquillo Barnetta resulted in a 2–0 defeat. Togo's final group game against France ended in 2–0 defeat.

=== Cameroon ===
On 27 October 2007, Pfister was appointed the manager of Cameroon, succeeding 80 other candidates. He coached Cameroon in the 2008 African Cup of Nations, held in Ghana. Two second half goals from Samuel Eto'o were not enough to win their opening game which finished 4–2 to Egypt. Cameroon picked themselves up four days later and beat Zambia convincingly 5–1. In their final group game Eto'o again scored twice as Les Lions Indomptables won 3–0. After finishing second to Egypt in the group stages, Cameroon progressed to the Quarter-finals where, after a close encounter, they beat Tunisia 3–2. Stéphane Mbia scored early in extra time to take the Indomptable Lions through to the Semi-finals. Alain N'Kong scored a 72nd-minute winner for Cameroon in a 1–0 win over Ghana in the Semi-finals, taking Cameroon to their sixth final of the African Cup of Nations. On 10 February 2008, Cameroon took on defending champions Egypt in the Final in Accra. Egypt scored a 77th-minute goal through Mohamed Aboutrika which would be enough to win the match and be crowned the champions of the 2008 African Cup of Nations. Eto'o was the tournaments highest scorer with five goals. Pfister stepped down from his role on 26 May 2009.

=== USM Alger ===
In January 2015, Pfister was linked with Algerian Ligue Professionnelle 1 club USM Alger, and signed a contract with the club shortly after. On 18 May Pfister was sacked as coach of USM Alger.

== Personal life ==
Pfister gained his coaching certificates in Magglingen in the 1960s, and later studied further in Cologne. Pfister is a UEFA Pro License holder, has a Bundesliga license for professional football coaching and is an Instructor for FIFA and German Football Association professional football coaching courses.

In 2001, Pfister was awarded the Order of Merit of the Confederation of African Football as well as a German Football Federation Honors Award.

== Managerial statistics ==
Managerial record by team and tenure
Team	Nat	From	To	Record							
Team	Nat	From	To	G	W	D	L	GF	GA	GD	Win %
Rwanda	(Rwanda)	1 October 1972	31 July 1976	4	0	0	4	3	20	−17	0.00
Burkina Faso	(Burkina Faso)	1 August 1976	31 December 1978	4	0	0	4	3	11	−8	0.00
Senegal	(Senegal)	1 January 1979	31 October 1982	38	19	8	11	47	33	+14	50.00
Ivory Coast	(Ivory Coast)	1 November 1982	31 August 1985	34	16	12	6	46	26	+20	47.06
Ivory Coast U19	(Ivory Coast)	1 November 1982	31 August 1985	14	8	4	2	27	11	+16	57.14
Zaire	(Zaire)	1 August 1985	31 August 1989	34	8	14	12	32	29	+3	23.53
Ghana U17	(Ghana)	1 September 1989	1 September 1991	15	9	4	2	21	9	+12	60.00
Ghana	(Ghana)	1 September 1991	31 December 1993	21	13	3	5	28	21	+7	61.90
Bangladesh	(Bangladesh)	1 January 1995	31 March 1997	14	4	3	7	9	20	−11	28.57
Saudi Arabia	(Saudi Arabia)	14 October 1997	17 December 1997	8	3	2	3	5	11	−6	37.50
Saudi Arabia	(Saudi Arabia)	1 July 1998	12 November 1998	11	9	2	0	27	8	+19	81.82
Zamalek	(Egypt)	2 December 1999	30 June 2002	97	62	24	11	190	92	+98	63.92
Togo	(Togo)	18 February 2006	31 August 2006	7	1	1	5	3	11	−8	14.29
Cameroon	(Cameroon)	26 October 2007	28 May 2009	15	10	1	4	35	15	+20	66.67
Trinidad and Tobago	(Trinidad and Tobago)	4 April 2011	31 December 2012	22	13	3	6	43	16	+27	59.09
Afghanistan	(Afghanistan)	6 February 2017	31 March 2018	9	3	3	3	11	14	−3	33.33
Career total				347	178	84	85	530	347	+183	51.30

== Honours ==
Cameroon

- African Cup of Nations: runner-up, 2008

Al Merrikh

- Sudan Cup: 2007
- CAF Confederation Cup runner-up: 2007

Nejmeh

- Lebanese Premier League: 2004–05
- Lebanese Elite Cup: 2004
- Lebanese Super Cup: 2004

CS Sfaxien

- Tunisian Coupe de la Ligue Professionnelle: 2002–03

Zamalek

- Egyptian Premier League: 2000–01
- Egypt Cup: 2001–02
- Egyptian Super Cup: 2001
- African Cup Winners' Cup: 2000
- CAF Super Cup runner-up: 2001

Saudi Arabia

- Arab Cup: 1998

Bangladesh

- Burma Tournament: 1995

Ghana

- Africa Cup of Nations runner-up: 1992

Ghana U-17

- FIFA U-17 World Cup: 1991

Ivory Coast

- U-19 Africa Cup of Nations: 1983

Individual

- Africa's Manager of the Year: 1992

== See also ==
- National team managers with 100 or more matches
