= 2002 Egyptian Super Cup =

2002–03 Egyptian Super Cup
Zamalek	Al Mokawloon Al Arab
1	0
- After extra time
- Date: 19 September 2002
- Venue: Cairo Stadium, Cairo
- Referee: Gamal Al-Ghandour (Egypt)
- Attendance: 50,000

The 2002–03 Egyptian Super Cup was the second edition of Egyptian Super Cup, an annual football match contested by the winners of the previous season's Egyptian Premier League and Egypt Cup competitions. Ahead of the match, Egyptian Premier League champions Ismaily withdrew as they refused to have the match played in Cairo. Al Mokawloon Al Arab who finished fifth in the league replaced them to face Egypt Cup winners Zamalek. Zamalek won the game 1–0 after extra time.

== Match details ==
19 September 2002

Zamalek	1–0 (a.e.t.)	Al Mokawloon Al Arab
Nabieh 119'	Report

Cairo Stadium, Cairo
Attendance: 50,000
Referee: Gamal Al-Ghandour (Egypt)

Zamalek	Al Mokawloon Al Arab

Zamalek:
GK	16	(Egypt) Abdel-Wahed El-Sayed
RB	15	(Egypt) Wael El-Quabbani	(substituted off) 90'
CB	3	(Egypt) Mohamed Sedik
CB	13	(Egypt) Tarek El-Sayed
LB	2	(Egypt) Ibrahim Hassan
CM	22	(Egypt) Hossam Abdel-Moneim
CM	20	(Egypt) Tamer Abdel-Hamid
RW	14	(Egypt) Hazem Emam
AM	10	(Egypt) Walid Salah Abd El-Latif	(substituted off) 75'
FW	23	(Egypt) Abdel-Halim Ali	(substituted off) 60'
FW	9	(Egypt) Hossam Hassan
Substitutions:
DF	6	(Egypt) Reda Seka	(substituted on) 90'
MF	11	(Egypt) Mohamed Aboul-Ela	(substituted on) 60'
FW		(Egypt) Osama Nabieh	(substituted on) 75'
Manager:
(Brazil) Carlos Roberto Cabral

Al Mokawloon Al Arab:
GK		(Egypt) Ahmed Saber
RB		(Egypt) Chiko
CB		(Egypt) Ibrahim El-Bahnasi
CB		(Egypt) Haytham Houssen	(substituted off) 46'
LB		(Egypt) Khaled Nabil
CM		(Egypt) Alaa Abd El-Ghani
CM	15	(Egypt) Ali Ashour	(substituted off) 60'
RW		(Egypt) Mohamed Ezz
AM		(Nigeria) Robert Akaruye
LW		(Egypt) Said Saad	(substituted off) 80'
CF		(Egypt) Sameh Youssef
Substitutions:
MF		(Egypt) Mostafa Marin	(substituted on) 46'
FW		(Egypt) Mohamed El Hadi	(substituted on) 60'
FW		(Egypt) Tamer Adel	(substituted on) 80'
Manager:
(Egypt) Abdul-Aziz Abdul-Shafi

Man of the Match:

Assistant referees:

Fourth official:
