= 1998–99 Egyptian Premier League =

Football league season

Egyptian Premier League
- Season: 1998–99
- Champions: Al Ahly
- Relegated: Ghazl El Mahalla (via play-off); Aswan; Baladeyet El Mahalla
- CAF Champions League: Al Ahly (1st)
- African Cup Winners' Cup: Zamalek (Egypt Cup winners)
- CAF Cup: Ismaily (3rd)
- Top goalscorer: Hossam Hassan (15 goals)

The 1998–99 Egyptian Premier League was contested by 14 teams. The first team in the league, Al Ahly was the champion and qualified for the 2000 CAF Champions League. Second placed team Zamalek qualified for the 2000 African Cup Winners' Cup via winning the Egypt Cup. Third placed team Ismaily qualified for the 2000 CAF Cup.

== League table ==
| Pos | Team | Pld | W | D | L | GF | GA | GD | Pts | Qualification or relegation |
|---|---|---|---|---|---|---|---|---|---|---|
| 1 | Al Ahly (C) | 26 | 21 | 5 | 0 | 46 | 8 | +38 | 68 | 2000 CAF Champions League |
| 2 | Zamalek | 26 | 16 | 5 | 5 | 39 | 17 | +22 | 53 | 2000 African Cup Winners' Cup (Note: Zamalek qualified by winning the Egypt Cup.) |
| 3 | Ismaily | 26 | 10 | 10 | 6 | 37 | 27 | +10 | 40 | 2000 CAF Cup |
| 4 | Al Masry | 26 | 12 | 4 | 10 | 34 | 30 | +4 | 40 | |
| 5 | El Mansoura | 26 | 8 | 8 | 10 | 25 | 25 | 0 | 32 | |
| 6 | Mazarea Dina | 26 | 7 | 10 | 9 | 19 | 21 | −2 | 31 | |
| 7 | El Ittihad El Skandary | 26 | 7 | 10 | 9 | 25 | 36 | −11 | 31 | |
| 8 | El Mokawloon | 26 | 7 | 9 | 10 | 20 | 23 | −3 | 30 | |
| 9 | El Sharkia | 26 | 8 | 6 | 12 | 23 | 33 | −10 | 30 | |
| 10 | El Qanah | 26 | 8 | 6 | 12 | 21 | 31 | −10 | 30 | |
| 11 | El Koroum (O) | 26 | 8 | 5 | 13 | 28 | 34 | −6 | 29 | Relegation play-off |
| 12 | Ghazl El Mahalla (R) | 26 | 6 | 11 | 9 | 18 | 23 | −5 | 29 | Relegation play-off |
| 13 | Aswan (R) | 26 | 7 | 6 | 13 | 30 | 48 | −18 | 27 | Relegation to Egyptian Second Division |
| 14 | Baladeyet El Mahalla (R) | 26 | 5 | 9 | 12 | 17 | 26 | −9 | 24 | Relegation to Egyptian Second Division |

Source: Global Sports Archive
(C) Champions; (O) Play-off winners; (R) Relegated

== Relegation play-off ==
2 May 1999

| El Koroum | 3–2 | Ghazl El Mahalla |
|---|---|---|
| Ashraf Khamis 6'; Ahmed Mustapha 10'; Hamada Abdullah 30' | Report | Mohamed Youssouf 41'; Ekrami Abdulaziz 60' |

Ghazl El Mahalla were relegated to the Egyptian Second Division.
