= Abdel Halim Ali =

Egyptian footballer (born 1973)

Personal information
- Full name: Abdel Halim Ali Abdel Halim
- Date of birth: 24 October 1973 (age 52)
- Place of birth: Omrania, Giza, Egypt
- Height: 1.87 m (6 ft 2 in)
- Position: Striker

Senior career*
| Years | Team | Apps | (Gls) |
| 1993–1999 | Eastern Company | | |
| 1999–2009 | Zamalek | 210 | (81) |

International career
| 1999–2006 | Egypt | 42 | (10) |
Medal record
Men's football
Representing Egypt
Africa Cup of Nations
| Winner | 2006 Egypt |
- * Club domestic league appearances and goals

Abdel Halim Ali Abdel Halim (Arabic: عبد الحليم علي عبد الحليم; born 24 October 1973) is an Egyptian retired footballer who played as a striker.

== Honours and achievements ==
=== Club ===
Zamalek

- Egyptian Premier League: 2000–01, 2002–03, 2003–04
- Egypt Cup: 2002, 2008
- Egyptian Super Cup: 2001, 2002
- CAF Champions League: 2002
- African Cup Winners' Cup: 2000
- CAF Super Cup: 2003
- Arab Champions Cup: 2003
- Saudi-Egyptian Super Cup: 2003

=== International ===
Egypt

- African Cup of Nations: 2006
- World Military Cup: 2001
- African Military Cup: 2004
