= Nathalie Suivestin =

Malagasy footballer

Personal information
- Date of birth: 2 July 1976 (age 50)
- Position: Forward

Senior career*
Years	Team	Apps	(Gls)
2000–2002	SO Emyrne		
2003	Léopards de Transfoot		
2004–2007	SO Emyrne		

International career
2000–2004	Madagascar	8	(1)
- * Club domestic league appearances and goals

Nathalie Suivestin (born 2 July 1976) is a retired Malagasy football striker.
