= 1995–96 Egyptian Premier League =

Egyptian Premier League
- Dates: 13 October 1995 – 30 June 1996
- Champions: Al Ahly (25th title)
- Relegated: Ghazl El Mahalla; Tersana; Olympic Club; Damietta
- CAF Champions League: Zamalek (2nd)
- African Cup Winners' Cup: El Mansoura (Cup Runner up); El Mokawloon (Defending Champion)
- Matches played: 240
- Goals scored: 447 (1.86 per match)
- Top goalscorer: Mohamed Salah Abo Gresha (14 Goals)

16 teams participated in the 1995–96 Egyptian Premier League season. The first team in the league was the champion, and was supposed to qualify to the CAF Champions League, but this did not happen as Al Ahly was boycotting the CAF competitions so the runner up Zamalek qualified instead. Al Ahly won the league for the 25th time in the club's history.

== League table ==
Pos	Team	Pld	W	D	L	GF	GA	GD	Pts	Qualification or relegation
1	Al Ahly (C)	30	21	7	2	56	14	+42	70	
2	Zamalek	30	19	9	2	58	21	+37	66	1997 CAF Champions League
3	Ismaily	30	13	13	4	44	28	+16	52	
4	Al Masry	30	12	12	6	22	16	+6	48	
5	El Qanah	30	13	8	9	27	26	+1	47	
6	El Mansoura	30	11	11	8	28	25	+3	44	1997 African Cup Winners' Cup
7	El Mokawloon	30	10	12	8	29	18	+11	42	1997 African Cup Winners' Cup
8	Gomhoriat Shebin	30	11	7	12	19	30	−11	40	
9	Suez	30	9	12	9	24	24	0	39	
10	Al Ittihad	30	8	10	12	19	27	−8	34	
11	Baladeyet El Mahalla	30	8	8	14	26	28	−2	32	
12	Al Aluminium	30	8	8	14	26	43	−17	32	
13	Ghazl El Mahalla	30	7	8	15	18	27	−9	29	Relegation to Egyptian Second Division
14	Tersana	30	5	10	15	16	35	−19	25	Relegation to Egyptian Second Division
15	Olympic Club	30	5	8	17	19	41	−22	23	Relegation to Egyptian Second Division
16	Damietta	30	4	9	17	16	44	−28	21	Relegation to Egyptian Second Division

(C) Champions

== Top goalscorers ==
Rank	Player	Club	Goals
1	(Egypt) Mohamed Salah Abo Gresha	Ismaily	14
2	(Egypt) Ayman Mansour	Zamalek	13
3	(Egypt) Ahmed El-Kass	Zamalek	12
4	(Ghana) Felix Aboagye	Al Ahly	12
5	(Egypt) Hossam Hassan	Al Ahly	11
