= 1993–94 Egyptian Premier League =

Egyptian Premier League
- Dates: 3 September 1993 – 18 June 1994
- Champions: Al Ahly (23rd title)
- Relegated: Tersana; Al Merreikh; El Mansoura
- African Cup of Champions Clubs: Ismaily (2nd)
- Matches: 183
- Goals: 336 (1.84 per match)
- Top goalscorer: Ahmed El-Kass; Bashir Abdel Samad (15 Goals)

14 teams participated in the 1993–94 Egyptian Premier League season. The first team in the league was the champion, and was supposed to qualify to the African Cup of Champions Clubs, but this did not happen as Al Ahly was boycotting the CAF competitions so the Runner up Ismaily qualified instead. Al Ahly won the league for the 23rd time in the club's history.

== League table ==
Pos	Team	Pld	W	D	L	GF	GA	GD	Pts	Qualification or relegation
1	Ismaily (Q)	26	16	7	3	49	16	+33	55	1995 African Cup of Champions Clubs
2	Al Ahly (Q)	26	15	9	2	39	15	+24	54	
3	Zamalek	26	15	5	6	28	16	+12	50	
4	Al Ittihad	26	7	14	5	20	24	−4	35	
5	Baladeyet El Mahalla	26	6	14	6	21	23	−2	32	
6	Olympic Club	26	9	7	10	30	30	0	34	
7	Al Masry	26	6	12	8	17	20	−3	30	
8	El Qanah	26	7	9	10	20	22	−2	30	
9	Ghazl El Mahalla	26	5	12	9	14	23	−9	27	
10	El Mokawloon	26	6	10	10	13	23	−10	28	
11	Gomhoriat Shebin	26	6	10	10	24	35	−11	28	
12	Tersana	26	6	9	11	19	27	−8	27	Relegation to Egyptian Second Division
13	Al Merreikh	26	3	14	9	19	28	−9	23	Relegation to Egyptian Second Division
14	El Mansoura	26	5	8	13	14	25	−11	23	Relegation to Egyptian Second Division

(Q) Qualified to Title playoff

== Title playoff ==
18 June 1994

Al Ahly	4–3	Ismaily
Mohamed Ramadan 9', 15', 64'; Ayman Shawky 67'	Report	Bashir Abdel Samad (penalty missed) 56'; Emad Soliman 75'; Ahmed Rizk 76'; El-Sagheer 90+3'

Alexandria Stadium, Alexandria
Referee: (Tunisia) Fathy

Al Ahly SC
Ismaily SC

== Top goalscorers ==
Rank	Player	Club	Goals
1	(Egypt) Ahmed El-Kass	Olympic Club	15
1	(Egypt) Bashir Abdel Samad	Ismaily	15
3	(Egypt) Essam Shaaban	Gomhoriat Shebin	10
3	(Egypt) Mohamed Ramadan	Al Ahly	10
5	(Egypt) Ayman Mansour	Zamalek	9
