= 1996–97 Egyptian Premier League =

Egyptian Premier League
- Dates: 20 August 1996 – 25 August 1997
- Champions: Al Ahly (26th title)
- Relegated: Gomhoriat Shebin; El Koroum; Al Merreikh; Al Aluminium
- CAF Champions League: Al Ahly (1st)
- CAF Cup: Zamalek (2nd)
- African Cup Winners' Cup: Ismaily (Cup winners)
- Matches: 243
- Goals: 562 (2.31 per match)
- Top goalscorer: Ayman Moheb (17 Goals)

16 teams participated in the 1996–97 Egyptian Premier League season. The first team in the league was the champion, and qualified to CAF Champions League, while the runner up qualified to the CAF Cup. The season started on 20 August 1996 and concluded on 25 August 1997. Al Ahly won the league for the 26th time in the club's history.

== League table ==
Pos	Team	Pld	W	D	L	GF	GA	GD	Pts	Qualification or relegation
1	Al Ahly (C)	30	20	9	1	59	20	+39	69	1998 CAF Champions League
2	Zamalek	30	18	6	6	49	30	+19	60	1998 CAF Cup
3	El Mansoura	30	13	10	7	44	30	+14	49	
4	Ismaily	30	12	9	9	39	39	0	45	1998 African Cup Winners' Cup
5	Al Ittihad	27	11	7	9	34	38	−4	40	
6	El Qanah	29	11	6	12	32	31	+1	39	
7	Al Masry	30	9	12	9	39	36	+3	39	
8	Mazarea Dina	30	10	9	11	33	40	−7	39	
9	Aswan	30	9	11	10	32	37	−5	38	
10	Baladeyet El Mahalla	30	7	16	7	25	28	−3	37	
11	El Mokawloon	30	8	12	10	27	23	+4	36	
12	Suez	30	7	12	11	24	32	−8	33	
13	Gomhoriat Shebin	30	7	12	11	26	35	−9	33	Relegation to Egyptian Second Division
14	El Koroum	30	8	9	13	36	48	−12	33	Relegation to Egyptian Second Division
15	Al Merreikh	30	7	5	18	27	45	−18	26	Relegation to Egyptian Second Division
16	Al Aluminium	30	5	7	18	30	44	−14	22	Relegation to Egyptian Second Division

(C) Champions

== Top goalscorers ==
Rank	Player	Club	Goals
1	(Egypt) Ayman Moheb	El Mansoura	17
2	(Egypt) Abdel Naser Mohamed	El Koroum	16
3	(Egypt) Hossam Hassan	Al Ahly	14
4	(Egypt) Ahmed El-Kass	Zamalek	13
5	(Egypt) Said Saad	Mazarea Dina	12

== Attendances ==
#	Football club	Average attendance
1	Al-Ahly	18,333
2	Zamalek	11,042
3	Al-Mokawloon	9,412
4	Al-Masry	6,615
5	El-Mansoura	6,487
6	Al-Ittihad Alexandria	6,284
7	Baladiyat	6,018
8	Ismaily	5,488
9	Aswan	5,012
10	El-Qanah	4,968
11	Gomhoriat	4,031
12	Mazarea Dina	3,102
13	Suez	2,987
14	El-Koroum	2,743
15	Al-Merreikh	2,184
16	Al-Aluminium	1,243
