= Hazem Emam =

Egyptian footballer (born 1975)

Hazem Emam حازم إمام
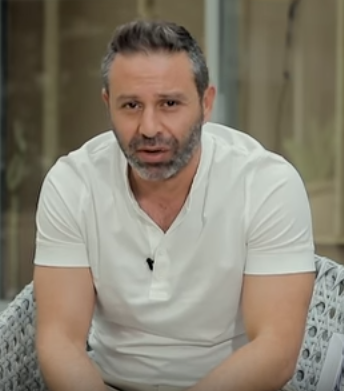
- Emam in 2020

Personal information
- Full name: Hazem Mohamed Yehia El Horria Mohamed Emam
- Date of birth: 16 April 1975 (age 51)
- Place of birth: Cairo, Egypt
- Height: 1.74 m (5 ft 9 in)
- Position: Attacking midfielder

Youth career
- Egyptian Shooting Club
- Zamalek

Senior career*
Years	Team	Apps	(Gls)
1993–1996	Zamalek	41	(5)
1996–2001	Udinese Calcio	11	(0)
1998–2000	→ De Graafschap (loan)	38	(4)
2001–2008	Zamalek	122	(27)
Total		212	(36)

International career
1995–2005	Egypt	87	(15)
Medal record
Men's football
Representing Egypt
Africa Cup of Nations
Winner	1998 Burkina Faso
African Games
Gold medal – first place	1995 Harare
- * Club domestic league appearances and goals

Hazem Mohamed Yehia El Horria Mohamed Emam (Arabic: حازم محمد يحيى الحرية محمد إمام; born 16 April 1975) is an Egyptian retired professional footballer who played as a attacking midfielder. He is currently a member of the Egyptian House of Representatives and a board member of the Egyptian Football Association.

== Career statistics ==
=== International ===
Appearances and goals by national team and year
National team	Year	Apps	Goals
Egypt	1995	2	0
Egypt	1996	6	0
Egypt	1997	9	7
Egypt	1998	15	1
Egypt	1999	10	4
Egypt	2000	11	0
Egypt	2001	10	0
Egypt	2002	8	2
Egypt	2003	7	1
Egypt	2004	7	0
Egypt	2005	2	0
Total		87	15

Scores and results list Egypt's goal tally first, score column indicates score after each Emam goal.

List of international goals scored by Hazem Emam
No.	Date	Venue	Opponent	Score	Result	Competition
1	16 June 1997	Seoul Olympic Stadium, Seoul, South Korea	Ghana	1–0	2–0	1997 Korea Cup
2	13 July 1997	Cairo International Stadium, Cairo, Egypt	Senegal	1–0	2–0	1998 African Cup of Nations qualification
3	27 July 1997	Alexandria Stadium, Alexandria, Egypt	Ethiopia	3–0	8–1	1998 African Cup of Nations qualification
4	27 July 1997	Alexandria Stadium, Alexandria, Egypt	Ethiopia	4–0	8–1	1998 African Cup of Nations qualification
5	27 July 1997	Alexandria Stadium, Alexandria, Egypt	Ethiopia	5–0	8–1	1998 African Cup of Nations qualification
6	17 August 1997	Osman Ahmed Osman Stadium, Cairo, Egypt	Liberia	5–0	5–0	1998 FIFA World Cup qualification
7	3 December 1997	Cairo International Stadium, Cairo, Egypt	Ghana	2–0	3–2	Friendly
8	23 September 1998	Kadriorg Stadium, Tallinn, Estonia	Estonia	1–2	2–2	Friendly
9	16 February 1999	Mong Kok Stadium, Mong Kok, Hong Kong	Bulgaria	3–0	3–1	1999 Lunar New Year Cup
10	30 March 1999	Stade Maurice Dufrasne, Liège, Belgium	Belgium	1–0	1–0	Friendly
11	29 June 1999	National Sports Stadium, Harare, Zimbabwe	Zimbabwe	1–1	1–1	Friendly
12	10 July 1999	Cuautitlán Izcalli, Mexico	New Zealand	1–0	1–1	Friendly
13	25 January 2002	Stade Modibo Kéïta, Bamako, Mali	Tunisia	1–0	1–0	2002 African Cup of Nations
14	31 January 2002	Stade Modibo Kéïta, Bamako, Mali	Zambia	2–0	2–1	2002 African Cup of Nations
15	8 June 2003	Port Said Stadium, Port Said, Egypt	Mauritius	5–0	7–0	2004 African Cup of Nations qualification

== Honours and achievements ==
=== Club ===
Zamalek

- Egyptian Premier League: 2000–01, 2002–03, 2003–04
- Egypt Cup: 2002, 2008
- Egyptian Super Cup: 2001, 2002
- CAF Champions League: 1996, 2002
- CAF Super Cup: 1994, 2003
- Arab Club Champions Cup: 2003
- Saudi-Egyptian Super Cup: 2003

=== International ===
Egypt

- African Cup of Nations: 1998
- All-Africa Games: 1995

=== Individual ===
- Africa Cup of Nations Dream Team: 1996
