= Medhat Abdel-Hady =

Egyptian footballer (born 1974)

Medhat Abdelhady
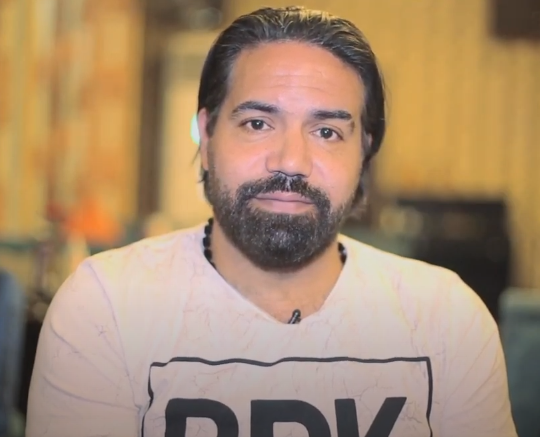

Personal information
- Full name: Medhat Abdelhady Mohamed Badawy
- Date of birth: 12 July 1974 (age 52)
- Place of birth: Cairo, Egypt
- Position: Left-back

Senior career*
Years	Team	Apps	(Gls)
1994–2000	Zamalek		
2000–2001	Kocaelispor	23	(0)
2001–2006	Zamalek	63	(6)
2006–2007	Petrojet		

International career
1995–2003	Egypt	55	(1)
- * Club domestic league appearances and goals

مدحت عبدالهادي كان مدافع سنتر باك و لم يلعب ظهير أيسر أبدا

Medhat Abdelhady Mohamed Badawy (Arabic: مِدْحَت عَبْد الْهَادِي مُحَمَّد بَدَوِيّ; born 12 July 1974) is an Egyptian football manager and a former player. A left-back, he spent most of his career playing for Zamalek. As an international player, he was among the Egypt national team members that participated in the 1999 FIFA Confederations Cup and won the 1998 African Cup of Nations.

== Club career ==
Abdelhady scored four goals for Zamalek in the African Club Cups.

== Honours ==
Egypt

- Africa Cup of Nations: 1998
- African Games Gold Medal: 1995

Zamalek

- Egyptian Premier League: 2000-01, 2002-03, 2003-04
- Egypt Cup: 1999, 2002
- CAF Champions League: 1996, 2003
- African Cup Winners' Cup: 2000
- Egyptian Super Cup: 2001, 2002
- CAF Super Cup: 1994, 1997, 2003
- Afro-Asian Club Championship: 1997
- Arab Club Champions Cup: 2003
- Egyptian Saudi Super Cup: 2003
