= 2001–02 Egyptian Premier League =

Egyptian Premier League
- Season: 2001–02
- Dates: 21 September 2001 – 4 July 2002
- Champions: Ismaily (3rd title)
- Relegated: Ghazl El Suez; El Qanah; Sohag
- CAF Champions League: Ismaily (1st), Zamalek (Defending champion)
- CAF Cup: Al Ahly (2nd)
- African Cup Winners' Cup: Baladeyet El Mahalla (Cup runner up)
- Matches: 182
- Goals: 475 (2.61 per match)
- Top goalscorer: Hossam Hassan (18 goals)
- Biggest home win: Ismaily 5–0 Sohag (26 October 2001)
- Biggest away win: Zamalek 1–6 Al Ahly (16 May 2002)
- Highest scoring: Tersana 5–3 El Qanah (19 November 2001)

The 2001–02 Egyptian Premier League was the 45th season of the Egyptian Premier League, the top Egyptian professional league for association football clubs, since its establishment in 1948. The season began on 21 September 2001 and concluded on 4 July 2002.

Ismaily won their 3rd Egyptian Premier League title in the club history.

Ghazl El Suez, Sohag and El Qanah have entered as the three promoted teams from the Egyptian Second Division.

== Teams ==
- Al Ahly
- Tersana
- Zamalek
- Ghazl Al-Mehalla
- Goldi
- Ismaily
- El-Ittihad El-Iskandary
- El-Masry
- El Mansoura
- Baladeyet El-Mahalla
- Al Mokawloon Al Arab
- El Qanah
- Ghazl El Suez
- Sohag

== League table ==
Pos	Team	Pld	W	D	L	GF	GA	GD	Pts	Qualification or relegation
1	Ismaily (C)	26	20	6	0	52	14	+38	66	Qualification for the Champions League
2	Al Ahly	26	20	4	2	50	17	+33	64	Qualification for the CAF Cup
3	Zamalek	26	16	5	5	58	37	+21	53	Qualification for the Champions League
4	Ghazl Al-Mehalla	26	9	8	9	28	28	0	35	
5	Al Mokawloon Al Arab	26	8	9	9	32	31	+1	33	
6	Goldi	26	8	8	10	26	34	−8	32	
7	El Masry	26	7	9	10	24	33	−9	30	
8	Tersana	26	8	6	12	36	45	−9	30	
9	El Mansoura	26	8	7	11	27	31	−4	31	
10	El-Mahalla	26	6	10	10	30	34	−4	28	Qualification for the African Cup Winners' Cup
11	El-Ittihad El-Iskandary	26	6	9	11	23	32	−9	27	
12	Ghazl El Suez (R)	26	7	5	14	29	40	−11	26	Relegation to the Second Division
13	El Qanah (R)	26	6	6	14	37	46	−9	24	Relegation to the Second Division
14	Sohag (R)	26	1	12	13	23	53	−30	15	Relegation to the Second Division

Rules for classification: 1) Points; 2) Head-to-Head points; 3) Head-to-Head goal difference; 4) Head-to-Head goal scored; 5) Head-to-Head away goal scored; 6) Goal difference; 7) Goal scored.
(C) Champions; (R) Relegated
