= 1997–98 Egyptian Premier League =

Egyptian Premier League
- Dates: 27 September 1997 – 9 June 1998
- Champions: Al Ahly (27th title)
- Relegated: Ghazl Suez; Suez; El Minya; El Shams
- CAF Champions League: Al Ahly (1st)
- CAF Cup: Zamalek
- African Cup Winners' Cup: Al Masry
- Matches played: 241
- Goals scored: 560 (2.32 per match)
- Top goalscorer: Abdel Hamid Bassiouny (15 Goals)

16 teams participated in the 1997–98 Egyptian Premier League season. The first team in the league was the champion, and qualified to CAF Champions League, while the runner up qualified to the CAF Cup. The season started on 27 September 1997 and concluded on 9 June 1998. Al Ahly won the league for the 27th time in the club's history.

== League table ==
Pos	Team	Pld	W	D	L	GF	GA	GD	Pts	Qualification or relegation
1	Al Ahly (C)	30	20	8	2	48	17	+31	68	1999 CAF Champions League
2	Zamalek	30	17	11	2	50	21	+29	62	1999 CAF Cup
3	El Mokawloon	30	14	11	5	51	21	+30	53	
4	Al Masry	30	13	9	8	37	32	+5	48	1999 African Cup Winners' Cup
5	Ismaily	30	12	11	7	48	27	+21	47	
6	El Mansoura	30	11	9	10	35	36	−1	42	
7	Al Ittihad	30	10	10	10	31	28	+3	40	
8	El Qanah	30	11	6	13	28	41	−13	39	
9	Ghazl El Mahalla	30	9	9	12	26	32	−6	36	
10	Aswan	30	9	8	13	34	44	−10	35	
11	Mazarea Dina	30	9	7	14	37	46	−9	34	
12	Baladeyet El Mahalla	30	8	9	13	28	34	−6	33	
13	Ghazl Suez	30	8	9	13	27	37	−10	33	Relegation to Egyptian Second Division
14	Suez	30	8	7	15	21	34	−13	31	Relegation to Egyptian Second Division
15	El Minya	30	6	7	17	27	49	−22	25	Relegation to Egyptian Second Division
16	El Shams	30	5	9	16	30	59	−29	24	Relegation to Egyptian Second Division

(C) Champions

== Top goalscorers ==
Rank	Player	Club	Goals
1	(Egypt) Abdel Hamid Bassiouny	Zamalek	15
2	(Egypt) Ahmed Sary	Al Ittihad	13
3	(Egypt) Mohamed Salah Abo Gresha	Ismaily	12
4	(Egypt) Abdel Naser Mohamed	El Mokawloon	8
5	(Egypt) Emad Shaker	Aswan	7
