= Hossam Abdel-Moneim =

Egyptian footballer (born 1975)

Hossam Abdelmoneim
Personal information
- Full name: Hossam Abdelmoneim Wahba Abdelwahahab
- Date of birth: 12 February 1975 (age 51)
- Place of birth: Egypt
- Position: Defender

Senior career*
Years	Team	Apps	(Gls)
1995–1997	Eastern Company		
1997–1999	Zamalek	31	(3)
1999–2000	Kocaelispor	12	(0)
2000–2003	Zamalek	55	(8)
2003–2005	Masry		
2005–2008	El-Ittihad		
2008–2010	Masry		

International career
1998–2000	Egypt		
- * Club domestic league appearances and goals as of 26 June 2008

Hossam Abdul Monem (Arabic: حسام عبد المنعم born 12 February 1975 in Egypt) is a retired Egyptian footballer. He has played for the Egypt national football team and participated in the 2000 African Cup of Nations. Previously, he played for Zamalek, Kocaelispor (Turkey), El-Ittihad and Masry. In Egypt, he started his career in Division II club.

== 12 Titles For Zamalek ==
3 Egyptian League title for Zamalek 2000/2001, 2002/2003 & 2003/2004
1 Egyptian Super Cup for Zamalek (2001/2002)
2 Egyptian Super Cup for Zamalek (2000/2001 & 2001/2002)
1 Egyptian Cup title for Zamalek 1998/99
1 African Cup Winners' Cup for Zamalek 2000
1 African Champions' League for Zamalek 2002
1 African Super Cup for Zamalek 2002
1 Arab Club Championship for Zamalek 2003
1 Egyptian Saudi Super Cup for Zamalek 2003
