= 2003 CAF Super Cup =

| Zamalek | Wydad AC |
| (Egypt) | (Morocco) |
| 3 | 1 |
- Date: 7 February 2003
- Venue: Cairo Stadium, Cairo
- Referee: Hichem Guirat (Tunisia)

The 2003 CAF Super Cup was the 11th CAF Super Cup, an annual football match in Africa organized by the Confederation of African Football (CAF), between the winners of the previous season's two CAF club competitions, the African Cup of Champions Clubs and the African Cup Winners' Cup.

The match took place on 7 February 2003, on Cairo Stadium in Cairo, Egypt, between Zamalek, the 2002 CAF Champions League winner, and Wydad AC, the 2002 African Cup Winners' Cup winner. Zamalek won the match 3–1 to retain the trophy, as the first team to win the tournament for three times.

== Teams ==
| Team | Qualification | Previous participation (bold indicates winners) |
|---|---|---|
| (Egypt) Zamalek | 2002 CAF Champions League winner | **1994**, **1997**, 2001 |
| (Morocco) Wydad AC | 2002 African Cup Winners' Cup winner | 1993 |

== Match details ==
7 February 2003
18:00 UTC+2

| Zamalek (Egypt) | 3–1 | (Morocco) Wydad AC |
|---|---|---|
| Abdel Wahed 28'; Emam 61'; Ali 65' | Report | Dah Zadi 78' |

Cairo Stadium
Referee: Hichem Guirat (Tunisia)

| **Zamalek** | **Wydad AC** |

| GK | 16 | (Egypt) Abdel Wahed Al Sayed |
| RB | 17 | (Egypt) Ahmed Saleh |
| CB | 15 | (Egypt) Wael El-Quabbani |
| CB | 1 | (Egypt) Medhat Abdel-Hady |
| CB | 5 | (Egypt) Besheer El-Tabei | (yellow card) ?' |
| LB | 13 | (Egypt) Tarek El-Sayed |
| CM | 20 | (Egypt) Tamer Abdel Hamid | (yellow card) ?' |
| AM | 26 | (Egypt) Mohamed Abdel Wahed |
| AM | 14 | (Egypt) Hazem Emam | | (substituted off) 82' |
| CF | 23 | (Egypt) Abdel Halim Ali | (yellow card) ?' | (substituted off) 90' |
| CF | 10 | (Egypt) Gamal Hamza | (yellow card) ?' | (substituted off) 78' |
Substitutes:
| MF | 30 | (Egypt) Shikabala | | (substituted on) 78' |
| MF | 8 | (Egypt) Mohamed Kamouna | | (substituted on) 82' |
| MF | 4 | (Egypt) Khaled El-Ghandour | | (substituted on) 90' |
Manager:
(Brazil) Carlos Roberto Cabral

GK
CB
CB
CB
RM
CM
CM
LM
CM
CF
CF
Substitutes:
MF
Manager:
(Switzerland) Michel Decastel

(Morocco) Tarik El Jarmouni
(Morocco) Hicham Louissi
(Morocco) Lahcen Abrami | (yellow card) ?'
(Morocco) Mustapha Talha | (yellow card) ?'
(Ivory Coast) Jean-Jacques Gosso | (substituted off) 46'
(Morocco) Chemseddine El Janabi
(Morocco) Abdelhaq Ait Laarif
(Morocco) Boujemaa Kassab
(Morocco) Mohamed Madihi
(Morocco) Redouane Allali
(Morocco) Rabie El Afoui
(Ivory Coast) Guillaume Dah Zadi | (substituted on) 46'
