= Wael El-Quabbani =

Egyptian footballer (born 1976)

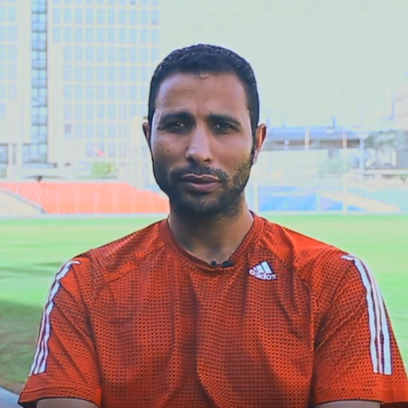

Personal information
- Full name: Wael El-Quabbani
- Date of birth: 2 September 1976 (age 50)
- Place of birth: Egypt
- Height: 1.86 m (6 ft 1 in)
- Position: Defender

Youth career
- Zamalek

Senior career*
Years	Team	Apps	(Gls)
- Zamalek
- Etisalat

Managerial career
- 2025: Zamalek (football director)
- * Club domestic league appearances and goals

Wael El-Quabbani وائل القباني (born 2 September 1976 in Egypt) is an Egyptian football executive and former Egyptian football player.

== Milestones ==
International Caps: 7
Participated in African Cup of Nations 2004

Previous Club
Aswan (Egypt)

== Honours ==
Zamalek

- Egyptian Premier League: 2000-01, 2002-03, 2003-04
- Egypt Cup: 2002
- Egyptian Super Cup: 2001, 2002
- CAF Champions League: 2002
- African Cup Winners' Cup: 2000
- CAF Super Cup: 2003
- Arab Club Champions Cup: 2003
- Egyptian Saudi Super Cup: 2003
