= 2000 African Cup Winners' Cup =

Tournament details
- Dates: 30 January – 10 December 2000
- Teams: 38 (from 1 confederation)

Final positions
- Champions: (Egypt) Zamalek (1st title)
- Runners-up: (Cameroon) Canon Yaoundé

Tournament statistics
- Matches played: 73
- Goals scored: 177 (2.42 per match)

The 2000 African Cup Winners' Cup was the twenty-sixth season of Africa's second oldest club football tournament organised by CAF.

In a final featuring two giants of African club football, four time African champions Zamalek of Egypt defeated three time African champions Canon Yaoundé of Cameroon 4–3 on aggregate over two-legs.

== Association team allocation ==
A total of 38 teams from 38 CAF associations qualified for the tournament after winning their respective premier domestic cups. Of the 38 teams that qualified 1 withdrew before fulfilling all of its fixtures and another was disqualified;

- Central African club Réal Olympique failed to show up for its Preliminary Round second leg match against Rayon Sports.
- Algerian club U.S.M. Alger was disqualified for fielding an ineligible player during their second leg tie against JS du Ténéré in the First Round.

== Format ==
The tournament consisted of five rounds preceding a two-legged final.

- Preliminary round – The 12 lowest ranked teams – whose rankings were determined by their association's performances at previous CAF club tournaments – were drawn against each other in 6 matches consisting of two-legs each.
- First round – The 6 winners from the preliminary round were then drawn against the remaining 26 clubs, resulting in 16 matches consisting of two-legs each.
- Second round – The 16 winners from the first round were then drawn against each other, resulting in 8 matches consisting of two-legs each.
- Quarter-finals – The 8 winners from the second round were then drawn against each other, resulting in 4 matches consisting of two-legs each.
- Semi-finals – The 4 victorious quarter-finalists were then drawn against each other in 2 semi-finals consisting of two-legs each.
- Final – The victorious semi-finalists contested a two-legged final to determine the champion.

The away goals rule was used to determine the victors in the event of a match being tied over the two-legs. If it was not possible to determine a winner using the away goals rule, the tie went to a penalty shootout to determine the winner.

== Preliminary round ==
The first legs were played on 29 & 30 January, and the second legs were played on 12 & 14 February 2000.

=== Matches ===
Team 1	Agg.	Team 2	1st leg	2nd leg
AS CotonTchad (Chad)	2–2	(Niger) JS du Ténéré	2–1	0–1
Wallidan (The Gambia)	0–3	(Benin) Mogas 90 FC	0–1	0–2
Réal Olympique (Central African Republic)	1–1^{[1]}	(Rwanda) Rayon Sports	1–1	-
FC Djivan (Madagascar)	0–0 (2–0 pen)	(Seychelles) Red Star	0–0	0–0
Mogoditshane Fighters (Botswana)	1–0	(Lesotho) Linare FC	1–0	0–0
Chief Santos (Namibia)	3–7	(Angola) Sagrada Esperança	1–3	2–4

Notes:

^{^[1]} Following a 1–1 draw at home to Rayon Sports in the first leg, Central African club Réal Olympique failed to show up for the second leg, handing Rayon Sports a walkover into the First Round.

== First round ==
The first legs were played from 17–19 March, and the second legs were played from 31 March-2 April 2000 with the exception of the matches between ASEC Ndiambour and ASEC Mimosas which were played on the 2nd (first leg) and 16th (second leg) of April.

=== Matches ===
Team 1	Agg.	Team 2	1st leg	2nd leg
JS du Ténéré (Niger)	1–2	(Algeria) U.S.M. Alger	1–1	0–1
AS Dragons (Democratic Republic of the Congo)	3–5	(Mali) Stade Malien	3–2	0–3
Young Africans (Tanzania)	1–5	(Egypt) Zamalek	1–1	0–4
Coffee FC (Ethiopia)	4–2*	(Malawi) Telecom Wanderers	3–0	1–2*
Mogas 90 FC (Benin)	1–3	(Tunisia) Club Africain	0–0	1–3
Plateau United (Nigeria)	3–3(a)	(Republic of the Congo) Étoile du Congo	3–2	0–1
Étoile Filante Ouagadougou (Burkina Faso)	0–1	(Morocco) FAR Rabat	0–0	0–1
Rayon Sports (Rwanda)	3–2	(Gabon) US Bitam	2–0	1–2
Mbale Heroes (Uganda)	1–4	(Sudan) Al-Merreikh	1–2	0–2
FC Djivan (Madagascar)	3–5	(Réunion) SS Saint-Louisienne	1–1	2–4
Coast Stars F.C. (Kenya)	0–4	(Cameroon) Canon Yaoundé	0–1	0–3
Mogoditshane Fighters (Botswana)	2–4	(Zambia) Zamsure	1–2	1–2
Al-Ittihad (Libya)	2–2(3–2 pen)	(Ghana) Great Olympics	2–0	0–2
Costa do Sol (Mozambique)	2–3	(South Africa) SuperSport United	1–1	1–2
ASC Ndiambour (Senegal)	3–3(a)	(Ivory Coast) ASEC	2–0	1–3
Sagrada Esperança (Angola)	6–1	(Togo) Agaza Lomé	4–1	2–0

Notes:

^{^[1]} U.S.M. Alger were disqualified after fielding an ineligible player in the second leg tie against JS du Ténéré. U.S.M. Algers' disqualification allowed JS du Ténéré, who had originally lost the tie 2–1 on aggregate, to progress to the Second Round.
^{^[2]} The second leg tie between Telecom Wanderers and Coffee FC in Blantyre was abandoned after 84 minutes. At the time of abandonment Telecom Wanderers were leading 2–1 but losing 4–2 on aggregate to Coffee FC, resulting in Telecom Wanderers' elimination at the hands of Coffee FC.

== Second round ==
The first legs were played on 6 & 7 May (with the exception of the tie between JS du Ténéré & Stade Malien which was played on 14 May), and the second legs were played on 27 & 28 May 2000.

=== Matches ===
Team 1	Agg.	Team 2	1st leg	2nd leg
JS du Ténéré (Niger)	2–1	(Mali) Stade Malien	1–1	1–0
Zamalek (Egypt)	3–3(4–2 pen)	(Ethiopia) Coffee FC	2–1	1–2
Club Africain (Tunisia)	4–4(a)	(Republic of the Congo) Étoile du Congo	4–2	0–2
FAR Rabat (Morocco)	2–2(a)	(Rwanda) Rayon Sports	1–0	1–2
Al-Merreikh (Sudan)	1-4	(Réunion) SS Saint-Louisienne	0–2	1–2
Canon Yaoundé (Cameroon)	5–1	(Zambia) Zamsure	4–1	1–0
Al-Ittihad (Libya)	2–1	(South Africa) SuperSport United	2–0	0–1
ASC Ndiambour (Senegal)	1–1(a)	(Angola) Sagrada Esperança	0–0	1–1

== Quarter-finals ==
The first legs were played on 5 & 6 August, and the second legs were played on 19 & 20 August 2000.

=== Matches ===
Team 1	Agg.	Team 2	1st leg	2nd leg
Zamalek (Egypt)	3–2	(Senegal) ASC Ndiambour	3–1	0–1
FAR Rabat (Morocco)	2–2(pen 4–5)	(Réunion) SS Saint-Louisienne	1–1	1–1
Étoile du Congo (Republic of the Congo)	2–5	(Cameroon) Canon Yaoundé	0–3	2–2
Al-Ittihad (Libya)	5–3	(Niger) JS du Ténéré	5–2	0–1

== Semi-finals ==
The first legs were played on 14 & 15 October, and the second legs were played on 27 & 30 October 2000.

=== Matches ===
Team 1	Agg.	Team 2	1st leg	2nd leg
Zamalek (Egypt)	2–0	(Réunion) SS Saint-Louisienne	2–0	0–0
Al-Ittihad (Libya)	1–2	(Cameroon) Canon Yaoundé	1–1	0–1

== Final ==
Team 1	Agg.	Team 2	1st leg	2nd leg
Zamalek (Egypt)	4–3	(Cameroon) Canon Yaoundé	4–1	0–2

=== First leg ===
26 November 2000

Zamalek (Egypt)	4–1	(Cameroon) Canon Yaoundé
Abdel-Moneim 26'; El-Said 31' (pen.); Bassiouny 51'; El-Doumany 79'		Mebenga 9'

Cairo Stadium, Cairo
Attendance: 50,000
Referee: Abderrahim El-Arjoun (Morocco)

=== Second leg ===
10 December 2000

Canon Yaoundé (Cameroon)	2–0	(Egypt) Zamalek
Tchameni 72'; Batang 90'

Stade Ahmadou Ahidjo, Yaoundé
Attendance: 60,000
Referee: Zeli Sinko (Ivory Coast)

Zamalek won the two-legged final 4–3 on aggregate
