= 2001 Egyptian Super Cup =

2001–02 Egyptian Super Cup
Zamalek	Ghazl El Mahalla
2	1
- After extra time
- Date: 14 September 2001
- Venue: Cairo Stadium, Cairo
- Man of the Match: Hazem Emam
- Referee: Gamal Al-Ghandour (Egypt)

The 2001–02 Egyptian Super Cup was the first Egyptian Super Cup, an annual football match contested by the winners of the previous season's Egyptian Premier League and Egypt Cup competitions, Al Ahly (Egypt Cup champions ) withdrew from participating, so Ghazl El Mahalla (Egypt cup runner-up) participated instead. Zamalek won the game 2–1 after extra time.

== Match details ==
14 September 2001

Zamalek	2–1 (a.e.t.)	Ghazl El Mahalla
Emam 20'; Hassan 116'		El-Etrawi 77'

Cairo Stadium
Referee: Gamal Al-Ghandour (Egypt)

Zamalek	Ghazl El Mahalla

Zamalek:
GK	25	(Egypt) Mohamed Abdel Monsef
RB	17	(Egypt) Ahmed Saleh
CB	1	(Egypt) Medhat Abdel Hady
CB	5	(Egypt) Besheer El-Tabei
LB	13	(Egypt) Tarek El-Said
CM	14	(Egypt) Hazem Emam
CM	20	(Egypt) Tamer Abd El-Hamid	(yellow card) ?'	(substituted off) 25'
RW	7	(Egypt) Mohamed Kamouna
AM	12	(Egypt) Mohamed Sabry		(substituted off) 64'
FW	9	(Egypt) Hossam Hassan
FW	10	(Egypt) Walid Salah Abd El-Latif		(substituted off) 46'
Substitutions:
DF	22	(Egypt) Hossam Abdel-Moneim		(substituted in) 25'
MF	11	(Egypt) Mohamed Abu El-'Ela		(substituted in) 64'
FW	27	(Ghana) Felix Aboagye		(substituted in) 46'
Manager:
(Germany) Otto Pfister

Ghazl El Mahalla:
GK	(Egypt) El-Sayed El-Kasrawi
RB	(Egypt) Ashraf Sheeha
CB	(Egypt) Ashraf Kabonga
CB	(Egypt) Karam Gaber
LB	(Egypt) Emad Salama
CM	(Egypt) Hossam El-Sherbini
CM	(Egypt) Eid El-Louzi	(substituted off) 60'
RW	(Egypt) Hossam Abdel Aal
AM	(Egypt) Amir Salah Zaki
LW	(Egypt) Ikrami Abd El-Aziz
CF	(Egypt) Ashraf Mamdouh	(substituted off) 60'
Substitutions:
MF	(Egypt) Mohamed Mahrous El-Etrawi	(substituted in) 60'
FW	(Egypt) Ramadan Ragab	(substituted in) 60'
Manager:
(Egypt) Farouk Gaafar

Man of the Match:
Hazem Emam

Assistant referees:

Fourth official:
Naser Abbas
