= Tarek El-Said =

Egyptian footballer (born 1978)

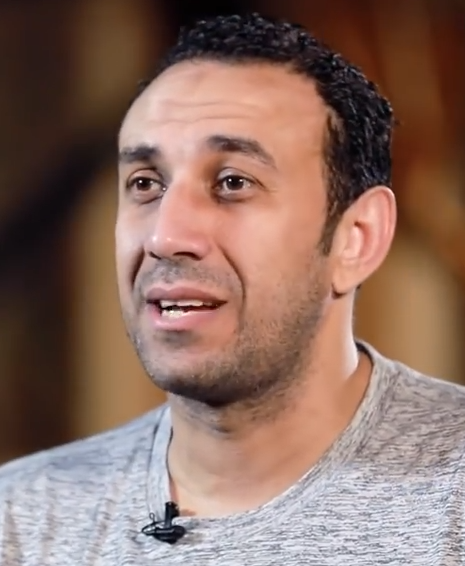

Personal information
- Full name: Tarek El-Said Mohamed Aly Abdo
- Date of birth: 5 April 1978 (age 48)
- Place of birth: Tanta, Egypt
- Height: 1.81 m (5 ft 11 in)
- Positions: Left midfielder; left back

Youth career
- Al-Ahly
- Zamalek

Senior career*
| Years | Team | Apps | (Gls) |
| 1997–2001 | Zamalek | 70 | (16) |
| 2001–2002 | Anderlecht | 11 | (1) |
| 2002–2006 | Zamalek | 62 | (7) |
| 2006–2008 | Al-Ahly | ? | (?) |

International career
| 1999–2005 | Egypt | 61 | (6) |
- * Club domestic league appearances and goals

Tarek El-Said Mohamed Aly Abdo (Egyptian Arabic: طارق السعيد محمد علي عبده; born 5 April 1978) is a former Egyptian footballer. He was a left winger who played for Al-Ahly, Zamalek, and Anderlecht in the Belgian First Division.

== Career ==
Tarek started as a youth player in Al-Ahly team under the coaching of Hossam El-Badry. Then he transferred to Zamalek at the age of 14, he earned his chance to play for the first team in 1998. He helped Zamalek achieve many tournament successes, and got the title of Egyptian League Top Scorer (2000–01) and was chosen the best Egyptian footballer in the same year. Then Tarek traveled to wear the shirts of famous Belgian club RSC Anderlecht, for a whole year. He returned Zamalek, because of injury.

After three years of difficulties in Zamalek, he regained his top performance with Al-Ahly after returning home again in July 2006. His accurate crosses helped to qualify for 2006 FIFA Club World Cup in Japan.

Tarek played for the Egyptian Olympic team until 1999. He debuted for the senior side on 12 November 1999 against Ghana in a friendly match that ended 2–1 for Ghana. His last national game was versus Belgium in a friendly game that ended 4–0 for the Egyptians, 9 February 2005.

== Honours and achievements ==
Zamalek

- African Cup Winners Cup: 2000
- Egyptian Super Cup: 2000–01
- Egyptian League: 2000–01, 2002–03, 2003–04
- Egyptian Soccer Cup: 1998–99
- CAF Super Cup: 2002–03
- Arab Champions League: 2002–03

Al Ahly

- FIFA Club World Cup bronze medalist: 2006
- CAF Super Cup: 2007
- CAF Champions League: 2006
- Egyptian League: 2006–07
- Egyptian Soccer Cup: 2007
- Egyptian Super Cup: 2006

Individual

- Egyptian League top scorer: 2000–01 (with 13 goals)
- Best Egyptian footballer of the year: 2000
- Scored 5 Goals for Zamalek in African Club Cups
