= 2002 CAF Champions League =

Tournament details
- Dates: 22 February – 13 December
- Teams: 41 (from 40 confederations)

Final positions
- Champions: (Egypt) Zamalek (5th title)
- Runners-up: (Morocco) Raja Casablanca

Tournament statistics
- Matches played: 78
- Goals scored: 247 (3.17 per match)
- Top scorer(s): (Egypt) Ahmed Belal (Ivory Coast) Antonin Koutouan (Morocco) Hicham Aboucherouane (7 goals each)
- Best player: (Morocco) Hicham Aboucherouane

The 2002 CAF Champions League was the 38th of the CAF Champions League, the Africa's premier club football tournament prize organized by the Confederation of African Football (CAF). Zamalek of Egypt defeated Raja Casablanca of Morocco in the final to win their fifth title. The holders of the 2001 edition, Al Ahly took part in the competition.

== Qualifying rounds ==
=== Preliminary round ===
Team 1	Agg.	Team 2	1st leg	2nd leg
SO Emyrne (Madagascar)	4–1	(Mauritius) Olympique de Moka	2–0	2–1
Costa do Sol (Mozambique)	5–0	(Burundi) Prince Louis FC	4–0	1–0
Hintsa FC (Eritrea)	1–4	(Rwanda) APR FC	1–0	0–4
Red Star (Seychelles)	0–4	(Tanzania) Simba SC	0–1	0–3
Wallidan FC (The Gambia)	4–1	(Guinea) Horoya AC	3–0	1–1
Tourbillon FC (Chad)	3–2	(Togo) Dynamic Togolais	3–2	0–0
Olympique Réal (Central African Republic)	1–1 (6-7 p)	(Equatorial Guinea) Akonangui FC	1–0	0–1
Mogoditshane Fighters (Botswana)	1–2	(Lesotho) LDF	0–1	1–1
Oserian Fastac (Kenya)	3–1	(Ethiopia) Mebrat Hail	1–0	2–1

=== First round ===
Team 1	Agg.	Team 2	1st leg	2nd leg
Petro Atlético (Angola)	1–1 (1–3 p)	(Madagascar) SO Emyrne	1–1^{1}	–
Highlanders FC (Zimbabwe)	1–2	(Mozambique) Costa do Sol	1–0	0–2
ASEC Mimosas (Ivory Coast)	8–2	(Gabon) FC 105 Libreville	4–0	4–2
Enyimba (Nigeria)	5–3	(Burkina Faso) EF Ouagadougou	4–0	1–3
Zamalek (Egypt)	6–0	(Rwanda) APR FC	6–0	0–0
Nkana FC (Zambia)	4–3	(Tanzania) Simba SC	4–0	0–3
Raja Casablanca (Morocco)	5–2	(The Gambia) Wallidan FC	2–1	3–1
Coton Sport (Cameroon)	1–2	(Republic of the Congo) Étoile du Congo	0–1	1–1
ES Tunis (Tunisia)	8–2	(Chad) Tourbillon FC	5–1	3–1
Al Madina (Libya)	5–5 (a)	(Equatorial Guinea) Akonangui FC	3–1	2–4
Hearts of Oak (Ghana)	2–4	(Mali) Stade Malien	1–1	1–3
CR Belouizdad (Algeria)	1–2	(Senegal) Jeanne d'Arc	1–1	0–1
TP Mazembe (Democratic Republic of the Congo)	3–1	(Lesotho) LDF	2–0	1–1
Orlando Pirates (South Africa)	4–1	(Réunion) SS Saint-Louisienne	2–1	2–0
Al Ahly (Egypt)	2–1	(Kenya) Oserian Fastac	2–1	0–0
Al-Merrikh (Sudan)	4–3	(Uganda) SC Villa	2–1	2–2

^{1} The match was played over one leg due to civil unrest and a violent general strike in Madagascar.

=== Second round ===
Team 1	Agg.	Team 2	1st leg	2nd leg
SO Emyrne (Madagascar)	2–3	(Mozambique) Costa do Sol	2–1	0–2
ASEC Mimosas (Ivory Coast)	5–4	(Nigeria) Enyimba	4–1	1–3
Zamalek (Egypt)	3–1	(Zambia) Nkana FC	2–0	1–1
Raja Casablanca (Morocco)	5–3	(Republic of the Congo) Étoile du Congo	3–0	2–3
ES Tunis (Tunisia)	5–2	(Libya) Al Madina	4–0	1–2
Stade Malien (Mali)	1–5	(Senegal) Jeanne d'Arc	0–3	1–2
TP Mazembe (Democratic Republic of the Congo)	4–2	(South Africa) Orlando Pirates	1–1	3–1
Al Ahly (Egypt)	3–3 (a)	(Sudan) Al-Merrikh	2–0	1–3

== Group stage ==
Key to colours in group tables
Group winners and runners-up advance to the Knockout stage

=== Group A ===
Pos	Team	Pld	W	D	L	GF	GA	GD	Pts	Qualification	RCA	TPM	JEA	AHL
1	(Morocco) Raja Casablanca	6	4	1	1	10	8	+2	13	Advance to knockout stage	—			
2	(Democratic Republic of the Congo) TP Mazembe	6	3	1	2	6	3	+3	10	Advance to knockout stage		—		
3	(Senegal) Jeanne d'Arc	6	2	0	4	7	10	−3	6				—	
4	(Egypt) Al Ahly	6	1	2	3	7	9	−2	5					—

=== Group B ===
Pos	Team	Pld	W	D	L	GF	GA	GD	Pts	Qualification	ZAM	ASEC	ESP	CdS
1	(Egypt) Zamalek	6	4	1	1	10	3	+7	13	Advance to knockout stage	—			
2	(Ivory Coast) ASEC Mimosas	6	4	0	2	12	6	+6	12	Advance to knockout stage		—		
3	(Tunisia) ES Tunis	6	3	1	2	9	6	+3	10				—	
4	(Mozambique) Costa do Sol	6	0	0	6	1	17	−16	0					—

== Knockout stage ==
=== Bracket ===
Semi-finals
(Ivory Coast)	ASEC Mimosas	2	0	2
(Morocco)	Raja Casablanca	0	4	4
(Democratic Republic of the Congo)	TP Mazembe	1	0	1
(Egypt)	Zamalek	1	2	3

Final
(Morocco)	Raja Casablanca	0	0	0
(Egypt)	Zamalek	0	1	1

=== Semifinals ===
Team 1	Agg.	Team 2	1st leg	2nd leg
ASEC Mimosas (Ivory Coast)	2–4	(Morocco) Raja Casablanca	2–0	0–4
TP Mazembe (Democratic Republic of the Congo)	1–3	(Egypt) Zamalek	1–1	0–2

=== Final ===
30 November 2002
--:-- UTC+1

Raja Casablanca (Morocco)	0–0	(Egypt) Zamalek
	[[[Category:All articles with unsourced statements]] Report]

Stade Mohamed V, Casablanca
Attendance: 60,000
Referee: Falla N'Doye (Senegal)
13 December 2002
19:00 UTC+2

Zamalek (Egypt)	1–0	(Morocco) Raja Casablanca
Abdel Hamid 45+4'	[[[Category:All articles with unsourced statements]] Report]

Cairo International Stadium, Cairo
Attendance: 67,310
Referee: Al-Shelmani (Libya)

== Top goalscorers ==
The top scorers from the 2002 CAF Champions League are as follows:

Rank	Name	Team	Goals
1	(Morocco) Hicham Aboucherouane	(Morocco) Raja Casablanca	7
1	(Egypt) Ahmad Belal	(Egypt) Al Ahly	7
1	(Ivory Coast) Antonin Koutouan	(Ivory Coast) ASEC Mimosas	7
4	(Egypt) Hossam Hassan	(Egypt) Zamalek	6
4	(Madagascar) Nathalie Suivestin	(Madagascar) SO Emyrne	6
3	(Egypt) Abdel Halim Ali	(Egypt) Zamalek	5
3	(Ivory Coast) Mamadou Dansoko	(Ivory Coast) ASEC Mimosas	5
3	(Ivory Coast) Bakari Koné	(Ivory Coast) ASEC Mimosas	5
3	(Cameroon) François Endene	(Morocco) Raja Casablanca	5
