= Egyptian Super Cup =

Annual association football tournament in Egypt

- Organiser(s): Egyptian Football Association
- Founded: 2001
- Region: Africa (CAF)
- Teams: 4
- Current champions: Al Ahly (16th title)
- Most championships: Al Ahly (16 titles)
- 2025 Egyptian Super Cup

The Egyptian Super Cup is Egyptian football's annual match contested between the champions of the Egyptian Premier League season and the holders of the Egypt Cup. If the Egyptian Premier League champions also won the Egypt Cup then the cup runners-up provide the opposition. The competition was founded in 2001, the first team to win the trophy was Zamalek SC. Starting with the 2023–24 season, the tournament adopted a new format in which four teams compete instead of the traditional two.

== Results ==
^{ET}	Match decided following extra time
^{PEN}	Match decided by a penalty shootout

Match date	Season	Winners	Result	Runners-up	Venue
14 September 2001	2001–02	Zamalek	2–1 (a.e.t.)	Ghazl El Mahalla (Note: Ghazl El Mehalla finalist of the Egyptian Cup, participated in place of Al Ahly who refused the dispute of the match.)	(Egypt) Cairo International Stadium, Cairo
19 September 2002	2002–03	Zamalek	1–0 (a.e.t.)	Al Mokawloon Al Arab (Note: Al Mokawloon played the super cup match in place of Ismaily Champions of the league, as the latter refused to play the final.)	(Egypt) Cairo International Stadium, Cairo
28 August 2003	2003–04	Al Ahly	0–0 (3–1 p)	Zamalek	(Egypt) Cairo Military Academy Stadium, Cairo
10 September 2004	2004–05	Al Mokawloon Al Arab	4–2	Zamalek	(Egypt) Cairo Military Academy Stadium, Cairo
27 July 2005	2005–06	Al Ahly	1–0 (a.e.t.)	ENPPI	(Egypt) Osman Ahmed Osman Stadium, Cairo
23 July 2006	2006–07	Al Ahly	1–0	ENPPI (Note: ENPPI qualified instead of Zamalek (second-placed in the league and cup), who was prevented from playing the match by decision of the football association.)	(Egypt) Cairo International Stadium, Cairo
9 August 2007	2007–08	Al Ahly	1–1 (4–2 p)	Ismaily (Note: The Ismaily, participated in place of Zamalek (second-placed in the league and cup) who refused the dispute of the match.)	(Egypt) Cairo International Stadium, Cairo
26 July 2008	2008–09	Al Ahly	2–0	Zamalek	(Egypt) Cairo International Stadium, Cairo
21 July 2009	2009–10	Haras El Hodoud	2–0	Al Ahly	(Egypt) Cairo Military Academy Stadium, Cairo
25 July 2010	2010–11	Al Ahly	1–0	Haras El Hodoud	(Egypt) Cairo International Stadium, Cairo
	2011–12	Not held due to 2011 Egyptian revolution			
9 September 2012	2012–13	Al Ahly	2–1	ENPPI	(Egypt) Borg El Arab Stadium, Alexandria
	2013–14	Not held due to 2013 Egyptian coup d'état			
14 September 2014	2014–15	Al Ahly	0–0 (5–4 p)	Zamalek	(Egypt) Cairo International Stadium, Cairo
15 October 2015	2015–16	Al Ahly	3–2	Zamalek	(United Arab Emirates) Hazza bin Zayed Stadium, Al Ain
10 February 2017	2016–17	Zamalek	0–0 (3–1 p)	Al Ahly	(United Arab Emirates) Mohammed bin Zayed Stadium, Abu Dhabi
12 January 2018	2017–18	Al Ahly	1–0 (a.e.t.)	Al Masry	(United Arab Emirates) Hazza bin Zayed Stadium, Al Ain
20 September 2019	2018–19	Al Ahly	3–2	Zamalek	(Egypt) Borg El Arab Stadium, Alexandria
20 February 2020	2019–20	Zamalek	0–0 (4–3 p)	Al Ahly	(United Arab Emirates) Mohammed bin Zayed Stadium, Abu Dhabi
21 September 2021	2020–21	Tala'ea El Geish	0–0 (3–2 p)	Al Ahly	(Egypt) Borg El Arab Stadium, Alexandria
28 October 2022	2021–22	Al Ahly	2–0	Zamalek	(United Arab Emirates) Hazza bin Zayed Stadium, Al Ain
5 May 2023	2022–23	Al Ahly	1–0 (a.e.t.)	Pyramids (Note: Pyramids, participated in place of Zamalek who refused the dispute of the match.)	(United Arab Emirates) Mohammed bin Zayed Stadium, Abu Dhabi
28 December 2023	2023–24	Al Ahly	4–2 (a.e.t.)	Modern Future	(United Arab Emirates) Mohammed bin Zayed Stadium, Abu Dhabi
24 October 2024	2024–25	Al Ahly	0–0 (7–6 p)	Zamalek	(United Arab Emirates) Mohammed bin Zayed Stadium, Abu Dhabi
9 November 2025	2025–26	Al Ahly	2–0	Zamalek	(United Arab Emirates) Mohammed bin Zayed Stadium, Abu Dhabi

== Results by club ==
Club	Winners	Runners-up	Total appearances
Al Ahly	16	4	20
Zamalek	4	9	13
Al Mokawloon Al Arab	1	1	2
Haras El Hodoud	1	1	2
Tala'ea El Gaish	1	–	1
ENPPI	–	3	3
Ghazl El Mahalla	–	1	1
Ismaily	–	1	1
Al Masry	–	1	1
Pyramids	–	1	1
Modern Future	–	1	1

== See also ==
- Egyptian Premier League
- Egypt Cup
