= Egypt at the FIFA World Cup =

International football delegation

Egypt's starting lineup against Argentina at the 2026 FIFA World Cup

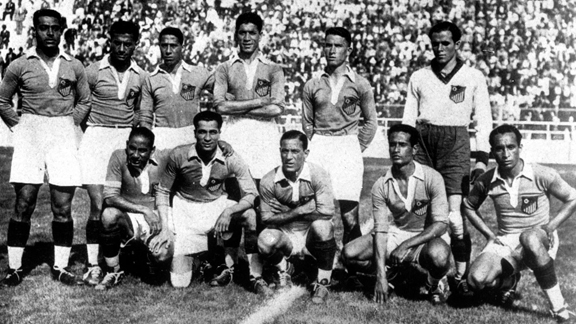
Egypt national team at the 1934 FIFA World Cup in Italy

Egypt has qualified for the FIFA World Cup on four occasions: in 1934, where it became the first Middle Eastern and African team to play in the World Cup, 1990, 2018, and 2026. they have produced 5 draws, 6 losses, and 2 wins in the competition, beating New Zealand and Australia via penalties in the knockouts during the 2026 World Cup.

When they qualified for the second time in 1990, they became the team with the longest-ever gap between two FIFA World Cup matches: 56 years and 16 days had passed. This was surpassed in 2022 by the qualification of Wales for the first time in 64 years. They have never qualified consecutively.

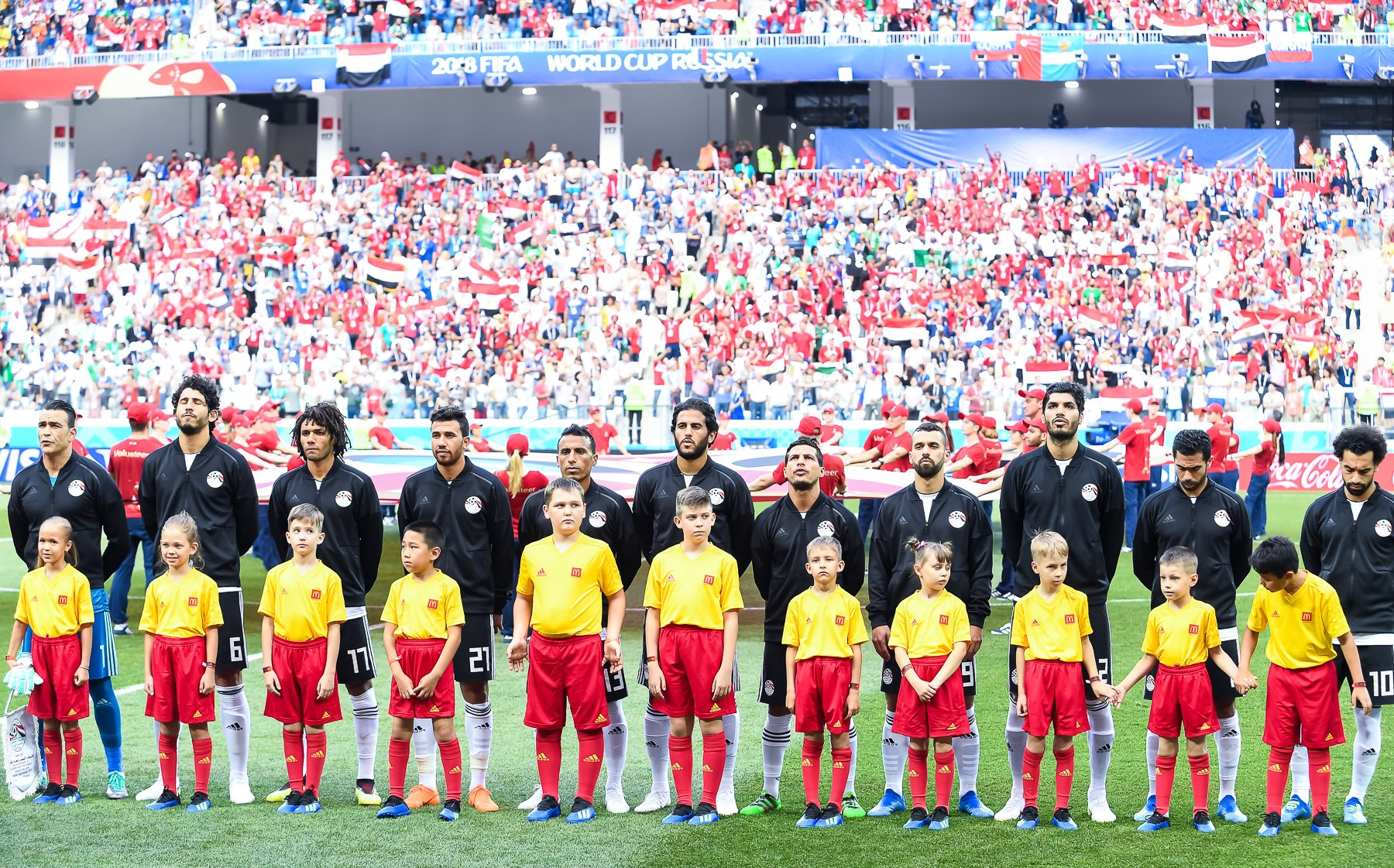
Egypt national team at the 2018 FIFA World Cup in Russia

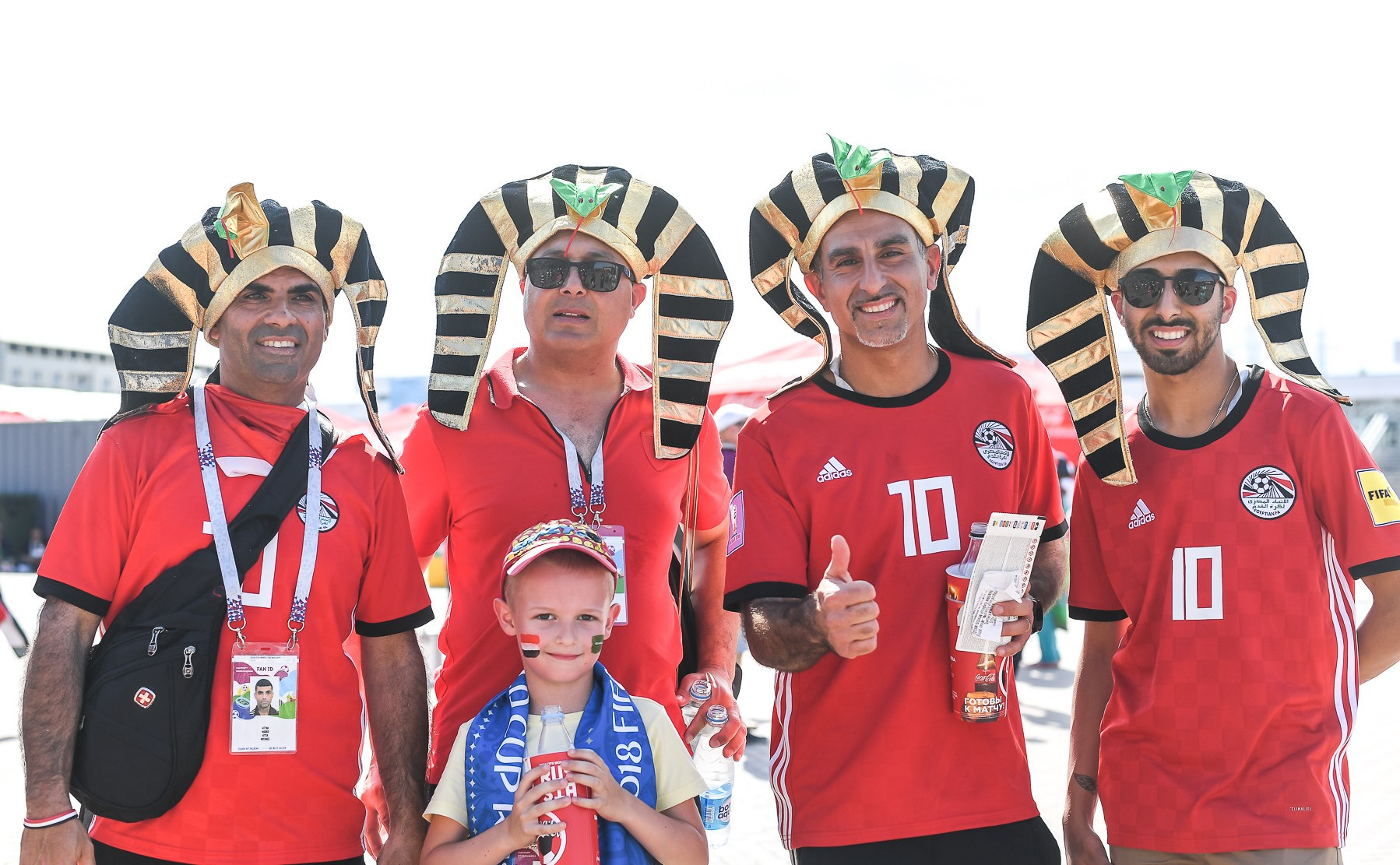
Egypt's fans at the FIFA World Cup in Russia

== FIFA World Cup record ==
FIFA World Cup record
Year	Round	Position	Pld	W	D	L	GF	GA
(Uruguay) 1930	Withdrew due to storm							
(Italy) 1934	Round of 16	13th	1	0	0	1	2	4
(France) 1938	Withdrew							
(Brazil) 1950	Did not enter							
(Switzerland) 1954	Did not qualify							
(Sweden) 1958	Withdrew							
(Chile) 1962	Withdrew							
(England) 1966	Withdrew							
(Mexico) 1970	Did not enter							
(West Germany) 1974	Did not qualify							
(Argentina) 1978	Did not qualify							
(Spain) 1982	Did not qualify							
(Mexico) 1986	Did not qualify							
(Italy) 1990	Group stage	20th	3	0	2	1	1	2
(United States) 1994	Did not qualify							
(France) 1998	Did not qualify							
(South Korea) (Japan) 2002	Did not qualify							
(Germany) 2006	Did not qualify							
(South Africa) 2010	Did not qualify							
(Brazil) 2014	Did not qualify							
(Russia) 2018	Group stage	31st	3	0	0	3	2	6
(Qatar) 2022	Did not qualify							
(Canada) (Mexico) (United States) 2026	Round of 16	15th	5	1	3	1	8	7
(Morocco) (Portugal) (Spain) 2030	To be determined							
(Saudi Arabia) 2034	To be determined							
Total	Round of 16	4/23	12	1	5	6	13	19

=== Overview of matches ===
Year	Round	Opponents	Score	Egypt scorer(s)
(Italy) 1934	Round of 16	Hungary	2–4	Fawzy (2)
(Italy) 1990	Group F	Netherlands	1–1	Abdelghani
(Italy) 1990	Group F	Republic of Ireland	0–0	
(Italy) 1990	Group F	England	0–1	
(Russia) 2018	Group A	Uruguay	0–1	
(Russia) 2018	Group A	Russia	1–3	Salah
(Russia) 2018	Group A	Saudi Arabia	1–2	Salah
(Canada) (Mexico) (United States) 2026	Group G	Belgium	1–1	Ashour
(Canada) (Mexico) (United States) 2026	Group G	New Zealand	3–1	Ziko, Salah, Trézéguet
(Canada) (Mexico) (United States) 2026	Group G	Iran	1–1	Saber
(Canada) (Mexico) (United States) 2026	Round of 32	Australia	1–1 (a.e.t.) (4–2 (p))	Ashour
(Canada) (Mexico) (United States) 2026	Round of 16	Argentina	2–3	Ibrahim, Ziko

== Uruguay 1930 ==
There was no qualification for the first World Cup. Rather, teams were simply invited. Egypt had started their travel to Uruguay, but a storm delayed their boat to Marseille.

== Italy 1934 ==
There was no Group stage. The first round was the Round of 16.

=== First round ===
27 May 1934
16:30 (CEST)

Hungary	4–2	Egypt
Teleki 11'; Toldi 27', 61'; Vincze 53'	Report	Fawzi 31', 39'

Stadio Giorgio Ascarelli, Naples
Attendance: 9,000
Referee: Rinaldo Barlassina (Italy)

Hungary	Egypt

GK	Antal Szabó
DF	Gyula Futó
DF	László Sternberg (c)
DF	István Palotás
MF	György Szűcs
MF	Gyula Lázár
MF	Gábor Szabó
MF	Imre Markos
FW	Jenő Vincze
FW	Pál Teleki
FW	Géza Toldi
Manager:
Ödön Nádas

GK	1	Mustafa Mansour
SW	3	Abdelhamid Ibrahim Sharli
DF	4	Hassan El-Far
DF	5	Ismail Rafaat
DF	2	Ali El-Kaf
MF	6	Hassan Raghab
FW	7	Mohamed Latif
FW	8	Abdulrahman Fawzi
FW	11	Mohamed Hassan
FW	9	Mahmoud Mokhtar El Tetsh (c)
FW	10	Mostafa Taha
Jimmy McCrae

== Italy 1990 ==
=== Group stage ===
Group F

Group F, featured the Netherlands, England, the Republic of Ireland and Egypt. In the six group games, five ended in draws. England beat Egypt 1–0, thanks to a 58th-minute goal from Mark Wright – and that was enough to win the group.

Team	Pld	W	D	L	GF	GA	GD	Pts
England	3	1	2	0	2	1	+1	4
Republic of Ireland	3	0	3	0	2	2	0	3
Netherlands	3	0	3	0	2	2	0	3
Egypt	3	0	2	1	1	2	−1	2

The Republic of Ireland and the Netherlands finished with identical records. With both teams assured of progressing, they were split by the drawing of lots to determine second and third place. ---

12 June 1990
21:00

Netherlands	1–1	Egypt
Kieft 58'	Report	Abdelghani 83' (pen.)

Stadio La Favorita, Palermo
Attendance: 33,288
Referee: Emilio Soriano Aladrén (Spain)

Netherlands	Egypt

GK	1	Hans van Breukelen
DF	2	Berry van Aerle
DF	5	Adri van Tiggelen
DF	4	Ronald Koeman
MF	13	Graeme Rutjes
MF	3	Frank Rijkaard
MF	6	Jan Wouters
MF	7	Erwin Koeman		(substituted off) 69'
FW	8	Gerald Vanenburg		(substituted off) 46'
FW	9	Marco van Basten
FW	10	Ruud Gullit (c)
Substitutes:
MF	11	Richard Witschge		(substituted on) 69'
FW	12	Wim Kieft	(yellow card) 58'	(substituted on) 46'
FW	14	John van't Schip
GK	16	Joop Hiele
MF	20	Aron Winter
Manager:
Leo Beenhakker

GK	1	Ahmed Shobair
SW	3	Rabie Yassin
DF	4	Hany Ramzy
DF	5	Hesham Yakan
MF	2	Ibrahim Hassan
MF	20	Ahmed El-Kass
MF	7	Ismail Youssef
MF	8	Magdi Abdelghani
MF	13	Ahmed Ramzy	(yellow card) 55'	(substituted off) 69'
FW	9	Hossam Hassan
FW	10	Gamal Abdelhamid (c)		(substituted off) 69'
Substitutes:
DF	15	Saber Eid
MF	16	Magdy Tolba		(substituted on) 69'
MF	18	Osama Orabi
FW	19	Adel Abdelrahman		(substituted on) 69'
GK	21	Ayman Taher
Manager:
Mahmoud El-Gohary

Assistant referees:
Edgardo Codesal (Mexico)
Juan Daniel Cardellino (Uruguay)

17 June 1990
17:00

Republic of Ireland	0–0	Egypt
	Report

Stadio La Favorita, Palermo
Attendance: 33,288
Referee: Marcel van Langenhove (Belgium)

Republic of Ireland	Egypt

GK	1	Packie Bonner
RB	2	Chris Morris	(yellow card) 51'
CB	4	Mick McCarthy (c)
CB	5	Kevin Moran
LB	3	Steve Staunton
MF	8	Ray Houghton
MF	7	Paul McGrath
MF	13	Andy Townsend
MF	11	Kevin Sheedy
FW	9	John Aldridge		(substituted off) 64'
FW	10	Tony Cascarino		(substituted off) 84'
Substitutions:
DF	12	David O'Leary
MF	14	Chris Hughton
FW	17	Niall Quinn		(substituted on) 84'
MF	21	Alan McLoughlin		(substituted on) 64'
GK	22	Gerry Peyton
Manager:
(England) Jack Charlton

GK	1	Ahmed Shobair	(yellow card) 72'
DF	2	Ibrahim Hassan
DF	5	Hesham Yakan
DF	4	Hany Ramzy
DF	3	Rabie Yassin
MF	18	Osama Orabi
MF	7	Ismail Youssef
MF	8	Magdi Abdelghani (c)
MF	16	Magdy Tolba		(substituted off) 60'
FW	20	Ahmed El-Kass		(substituted off) 76'
FW	9	Hossam Hassan
Substitutions:
MF	10	Gamal Abdelhamid		(substituted on) 76'
FW	12	Taher Abouzeid		(substituted on) 60'
DF	15	Saber Eid
FW	19	Adel Abdelrahman
GK	21	Ayman Taher
Manager:
Mahmoud El-Gohary

Assistant referees:
Joël Quiniou (France)
Rosario Lo Bello (Italy)

21 June 1990
21:00

England	1–0	Egypt
Wright 58'	Report

Stadio Sant'Elia, Cagliari
Attendance: 34,959
Referee: Kurt Röthlisberger (Switzerland)

England	Egypt

GK	1	Peter Shilton (c)
LB	3	Stuart Pearce
CB	5	Des Walker
CB	14	Mark Wright
RB	12	Paul Parker
RW	8	Chris Waddle		(substituted off) 86'
CM	16	Steve McMahon
CM	19	Paul Gascoigne
LW	11	John Barnes
FW	21	Steve Bull		(substituted off) 84'
FW	10	Gary Lineker
Substitutes:
MF	4	Neil Webb
DF	6	Terry Butcher
FW	9	Peter Beardsley	(yellow card) 85'	(substituted on) 84'
GK	13	Chris Woods
MF	17	David Platt		(substituted on) 86'
Manager:
Bobby Robson

GK	1	Ahmed Shobair
SW	4	Hany Ramzy
DF	2	Ibrahim Hassan	(yellow card) 47'
DF	5	Hesham Yakan
DF	7	Ismail Youssef
DF	3	Rabie Yassin
MF	20	Ahmed El-Kass		(substituted off) 77'
MF	8	Magdi Abdelghani	(yellow card) 38'
MF	10	Gamal Abdelhamid (c)		(substituted off) 77'
MF	13	Ahmed Ramzy
FW	9	Hossam Hassan
Substitutes:
FW	11	Tarek Soliman		(substituted on) 77'
DF	15	Saber Eid
MF	18	Osama Orabi
FW	19	Adel Abdelrahman		(substituted on) 77'
GK	21	Ayman Taher
Manager:
Mahmoud El-Gohary

Assistant referees:
Berny Ulloa Morera (Costa Rica)
Edgardo Codesal (Mexico)

== Russia 2018 ==
=== Group stage ===
Group A

Pos	Team	Pld	W	D	L	GF	GA	GD	Pts	Qualification
1	Uruguay	3	3	0	0	5	0	+5	9	Advance to knockout stage
2	Russia (H)	3	2	0	1	8	4	+4	6	Advance to knockout stage
3	Saudi Arabia	3	1	0	2	2	7	−5	3	
4	Egypt	3	0	0	3	2	6	−4	0	

Source: FIFA
Rules for classification: Group stage tiebreakers
(H) Hosts
15 June 2018
17:00 YEKT (UTC+5)

Egypt	0–1	Uruguay
	Report	Giménez 89'

Central Stadium, Yekaterinburg
Attendance: 27,015
Referee: Björn Kuipers (Netherlands)

Egypt	Uruguay

GK	23	Mohamed El Shenawy
RB	7	Ahmed Fathy (c)
CB	2	Ali Gabr
CB	6	Ahmed Hegazi	(yellow card) 90+6'
LB	13	Mohamed Abdel Shafy
CM	8	Tarek Hamed		(substituted off) 50'
CM	17	Mohamed Elneny
RW	22	Amr Warda		(substituted off) 82'
AM	19	Abdallah Said
LW	21	Trézéguet
CF	9	Marwan Mohsen		(substituted off) 63'
Substitutions:
MF	5	Sam Morsy	(yellow card) 90+4'	(substituted on) 50'
FW	11	Kahraba		(substituted on) 63'
FW	14	Ramadan Sobhi		(substituted on) 82'
Manager:
(Argentina) Héctor Cúper

GK	1	Fernando Muslera
RB	4	Guillermo Varela
CB	2	José Giménez
CB	3	Diego Godín (c)
LB	22	Martín Cáceres
RM	8	Nahitan Nández	(substituted off) 58'
CM	15	Matías Vecino	(substituted off) 87'
CM	6	Rodrigo Bentancur
LM	10	Giorgian De Arrascaeta	(substituted off) 59'
CF	9	Luis Suárez
CF	21	Edinson Cavani
Substitutions:
MF	5	Carlos Sánchez	(substituted on) 58'
MF	7	Cristian Rodríguez	(substituted on) 59'
MF	14	Lucas Torreira	(substituted on) 87'
Manager:
Óscar Tabárez

Man of the Match:
Mohamed El Shenawy (Egypt)

Assistant referees:
Sander van Roekel (Netherlands)
Erwin Zeinstra (Netherlands)
Fourth official:
Milorad Mažić (Serbia)
Reserve assistant referee:
Milovan Ristić (Serbia)
Video assistant referee:
Danny Makkelie (Netherlands)
Assistant video assistant referees:
Paweł Gil (Poland)
Cyril Gringore (France)
Clément Turpin (France)

=== Russia vs Egypt ===
19 June 2018
21:00 MSK (UTC+3)

Russia	3–1	Egypt
Fathy 47' (o.g.); Cheryshev 59'; Dzyuba 62'	Report	Salah 73' (pen.)

Krestovsky Stadium, Saint Petersburg
Attendance: 64,468
Referee: Enrique Cáceres (Paraguay)

Russia	Egypt

GK	1	Igor Akinfeev (c)
RB	2	Mário Fernandes
CB	3	Ilya Kutepov
CB	4	Sergei Ignashevich
LB	18	Yuri Zhirkov		(substituted off) 86'
CM	11	Roman Zobnin
CM	8	Yury Gazinsky
RW	19	Aleksandr Samedov
AM	17	Aleksandr Golovin
LW	6	Denis Cheryshev		(substituted off) 74'
CF	22	Artem Dzyuba		(substituted off) 79'
Substitutions:
MF	7	Daler Kuzyayev		(substituted on) 74'
FW	10	Fyodor Smolov	(yellow card) 84'	(substituted on) 79'
DF	13	Fyodor Kudryashov		(substituted on) 86'
Manager:
Stanislav Cherchesov

GK	23	Mohamed El Shenawy
RB	7	Ahmed Fathy (c)
CB	2	Ali Gabr
CB	6	Ahmed Hegazi
LB	13	Mohamed Abdel Shafy
CM	8	Tarek Hamed
CM	17	Mohamed Elneny		(substituted off) 64'
RW	10	Mohamed Salah
AM	19	Abdallah Said
LW	21	Trézéguet	(yellow card) 57'	(substituted off) 68'
CF	9	Marwan Mohsen		(substituted off) 82'
Substitutions:
FW	22	Amr Warda		(substituted on) 64'
FW	14	Ramadan Sobhi		(substituted on) 68'
FW	11	Kahraba		(substituted on) 82'
Manager:
(Argentina) Héctor Cúper

Man of the Match:
Denis Cheryshev (Russia)

Assistant referees:
Eduardo Cardozo (Paraguay)
Juan Zorrilla (Paraguay)
Fourth official:
Cüneyt Çakır (Turkey)
Reserve assistant referee:
Bahattin Duran (Turkey)
Video assistant referee:
Massimiliano Irrati (Italy)
Assistant video assistant referees:
Mauro Vigliano (Argentina)
Carlos Astroza (Chile)
Szymon Marciniak (Poland)

=== Saudi Arabia vs Egypt ===
25 June 2018
17:00 MSK (UTC+3)

Saudi Arabia	2–1	Egypt
Al-Faraj 45+6' (pen.); Al-Dawsari 90+5'	Report	Salah 22'

Volgograd Arena, Volgograd
Attendance: 36,823
Referee: Wilmar Roldán (Colombia)

Saudi Arabia	Egypt

GK	21	Yasser Al-Mosailem
RB	6	Mohammed Al-Breik
CB	3	Osama Hawsawi (c)
CB	23	Motaz Hawsawi
LB	13	Yasser Al-Shahrani
DM	14	Abdullah Otayf
CM	7	Salman Al-Faraj
CM	16	Housain Al-Mogahwi
RW	9	Hattan Bahebri	(substituted off) 65'
LW	18	Salem Al-Dawsari
CF	19	Fahad Al-Muwallad	(substituted off) 79'
Substitutions:
FW	20	Muhannad Assiri	(substituted on) 65'
MF	8	Yahya Al-Shehri	(substituted on) 79'
Manager:
(Spain) Juan Antonio Pizzi

GK	1	Essam El Hadary (c)
RB	7	Ahmed Fathy	(yellow card) 86'
CB	2	Ali Gabr	(yellow card) 45+5'
CB	6	Ahmed Hegazi
LB	13	Mohamed Abdel Shafy
CM	17	Mohamed Elneny
CM	8	Tarek Hamed
RW	10	Mohamed Salah
AM	19	Abdallah Said		(substituted off) 45+7'
LW	21	Trézéguet		(substituted off) 81'
CF	9	Marwan Mohsen		(substituted off) 64'
Substitutions:
FW	22	Amr Warda		(substituted on) 45+7'
FW	14	Ramadan Sobhi		(substituted on) 64'
FW	11	Kahraba		(substituted on) 81'
Manager:
(Argentina) Héctor Cúper

Man of the Match:
Mohamed Salah (Egypt)

Assistant referees:
Alexander Guzmán (Colombia)
Cristian de la Cruz (Colombia)
Fourth official:
Ricardo Montero (Costa Rica)
Reserve assistant referee:
Hiroshi Yamauchi (Japan)
Video assistant referee:
Artur Soares Dias (Portugal)
Assistant video assistant referees:
Tiago Martins (Portugal)
Carlos Astroza (Chile)
Wilton Sampaio (Brazil)

== United States/Canada/Mexico 2026 ==
=== Group stage ===
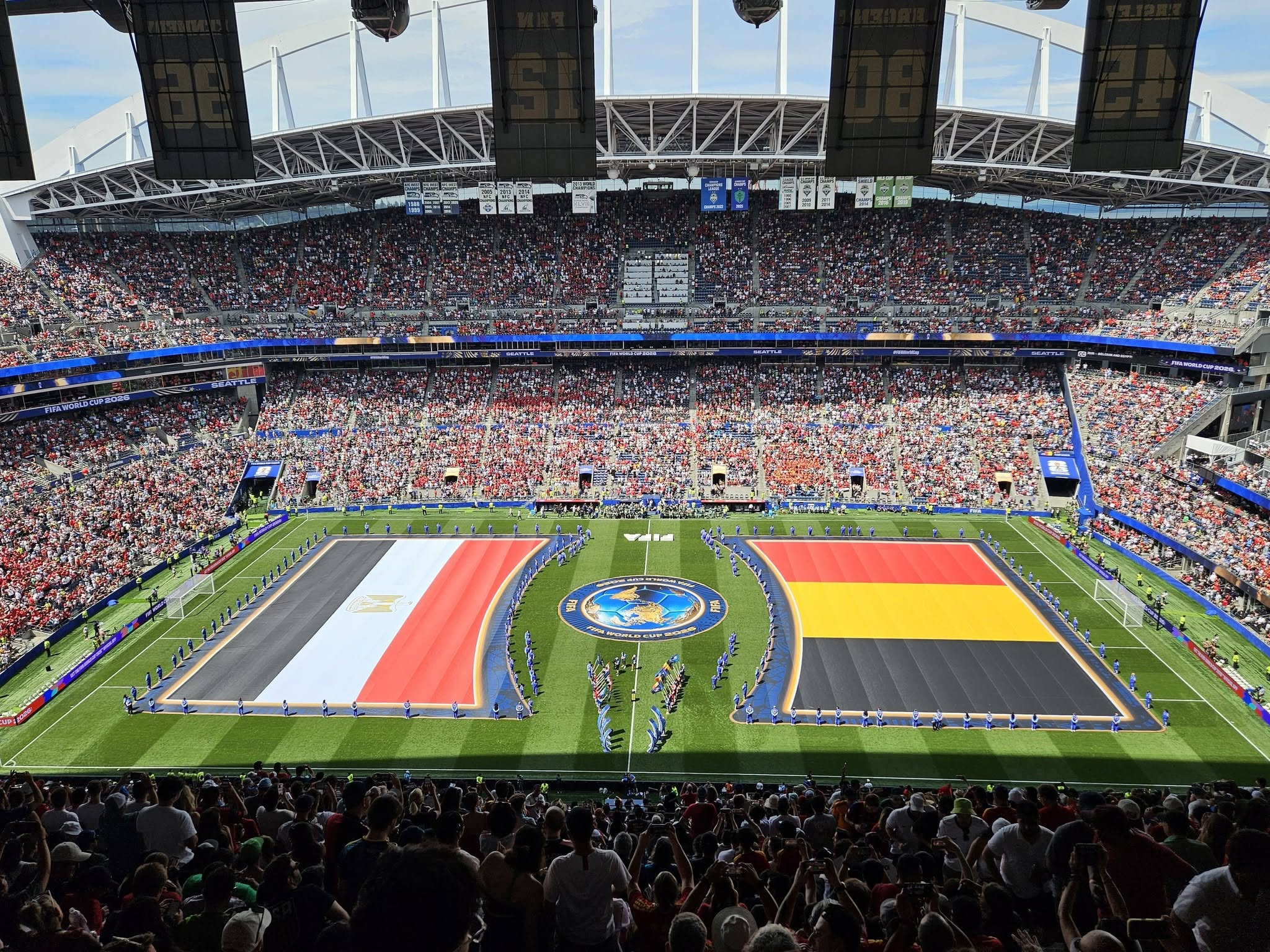
Prior to their match against Belgium at Lumen Field in Seattle.

Pos	Team	Pld	W	D	L	GF	GA	GD	Pts	Qualification
1	Belgium	3	1	2	0	6	2	+4	5 (Note: Tied on head-to-head result (Belgium 1–1 Egypt). Overall goal difference was used as the tiebreaker.)	Advance to knockout stage
2	Egypt	3	1	2	0	5	3	+2	5	Advance to knockout stage
3	Iran	3	0	3	0	3	3	0	3	
4	New Zealand	3	0	1	2	4	10	−6	1	

Source: FIFA
Notes:
June 15, 2026
12:00 p.m. UTC−7

Belgium	1–1	Egypt
Hany 66' (o.g.)	(Note: "Belgium vs Egypt | First Stage | FIFA World Cup 2026". FIFA. Retrieved June 15, 2026.; "Match Report – Group G – Belgium v. Egypt". FIFA. Retrieved June 15, 2026.; "Post match summary report – Group G – Belgium v. Egypt". FIFA. June 15, 2026. Retrieved June 17, 2026.)	Ashour 19'

Lumen Field, Seattle
Attendance: 66,775
Referee: Ramon Abatti (Brazil)

Man of the Match:
Emam Ashour (Egypt)

June 21, 2026
6:00 p.m. UTC−7

New Zealand	1–3	Egypt
Surman 15'	(Note: "New Zealand vs Egypt | First Stage | FIFA World Cup 2026". FIFA. Retrieved June 22, 2026.; "Match Report – Group G – New Zealand v. Egypt". FIFA. June 22, 2026. Retrieved June 22, 2026.; "Post match summary report – Group G – New Zealand v. Egypt". FIFA. June 22, 2026. Retrieved June 22, 2026.)	Ziko 58'; Salah 67'; Trézéguet 82'

BC Place, Vancouver
Attendance: 52,497
Referee: Omar Al Ali (United Arab Emirates)

Man of the Match:
Mohamed Salah (Egypt)

June 26, 2026
8:00 p.m. UTC−7

Egypt	1–1	Iran
Saber 5'	(Note: "Egypt vs IR Iran | First Stage | FIFA World Cup 2026". FIFA. Retrieved June 27, 2026.; "Match Report – Group G – Egypt v. IR Iran". FIFA. June 27, 2026. Retrieved June 27, 2026.; "Post match summary report – Group G – Egypt v. IR Iran". FIFA. June 27, 2026. Retrieved June 27, 2026.)	Rezaeian 14'

Lumen Field, Seattle
Attendance: 66,925
Referee: Szymon Marciniak (Poland)

Man of the Match:
Ramin Rezaeian (Iran)
Egypt finished as Group G runners-up on goal difference behind Belgium, advancing out of the group stage for the first time and earning a round of 32 meeting with Australia.

=== Knockout stage ===
Round of 32

July 3, 2026
1:00 p.m. UTC−5

Australia	1–1 (a.e.t.)	Egypt
Hany 55' (o.g.)	(Note: "Australia vs Egypt | Round of 32 | FIFA World Cup 2026". FIFA. Retrieved July 3, 2026.; "Match Report – Round of 32 – Australia v. Egypt". FIFA. July 3, 2026. Retrieved July 3, 2026.; "Post match summary report – Round of 32 – Australia v. Egypt". FIFA. July 3, 2026. Retrieved July 4, 2026.)	Ashour 13'
Penalties
Souttar (penalty missed); Irvine (penalty scored); Mabil (penalty scored); Herrington (penalty missed)	2–4	(penalty scored) Saber; (penalty scored) Rabia; (penalty scored) Salah; (penalty scored) Abdelmaguid

AT&T Stadium, Arlington
Attendance: 70,244
Referee: Gustavo Tejera (Uruguay)

Man of the Match:
Mohamed Salah (Egypt)

Round of 16

July 7, 2026
12:00 p.m. UTC−4

Argentina	3–2	Egypt
Romero 79'; Messi 83'; Fernández 90+2'	(Note: "Argentina vs Egypt | Round of 16 | FIFA World Cup 2026". FIFA. Retrieved July 7, 2026.; "Match Report – Round of 16 – Argentina v. Egypt". FIFA. July 7, 2026. Retrieved July 7, 2026.; "Post match summary report – Round of 16 – Argentina v. Egypt". FIFA. July 7, 2026. Retrieved July 9, 2026.)	Ibrahim 15'; Ziko 67'

Mercedes-Benz Stadium, Atlanta
Attendance: 68,239
Referee: François Letexier (France)

Man of the Match:
Lionel Messi (Argentina)

== Player records ==
As of 7 July 2026

=== Records ===
On 25 June 2018, Egyptian goalkeeper Essam El Hadary notably became the oldest player ever to appear in a World Cup match, at the age of 45 years and 5 months. He saved a penalty in the first half of the match against Saudi Arabia, but Egypt would still ultimately lose 2–1.

Mohamed Hany is the player with the most own goals scored in the World Cup. He scored an own goal against Belgium and then Australia respectively in 2026. Another record in 2026 achieved was Egyptian goalkeeper Mustafa Shobeir saving 2 penalities, the most for any goalkeeper, although tied with many others.

=== Most appearances ===
Before their 2026 participation, no Egyptian player had ever taken part in one more than one World Cup tournament. The team of 1934 was only able to play one match because of a different tournament format.

Rank	Player	Matches	World Cups
1	Mohamed Salah	7	2018 and 2026
1	Trézéguet	7	2018 and 2026
3	Emam Ashour	5	2026
3	Marwan Attia	5	2026
3	Mohamed Hany	5	2026
3	Yasser Ibrahim	5	2026
3	Omar Marmoush	5	2026
3	Ramy Rabia	5	2026
3	Mostafa Shobeir	5	2026
3	Mostafa Ziko	5	2026

=== Goalscorers ===
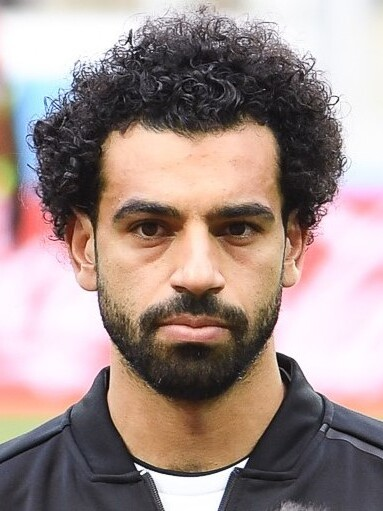
Mohamed Salah, Egypt's top scorer at the World Cup

With a brace on 27 May 1934 in Egypt's first-ever World Cup match (a 2–4 defeat against Hungary in Naples), Abdulrahman Fawzi became the only African goalscorer at a FIFA World Cup finals for decades, until Houmane Jarir scored for Morocco in 1970. It took until 2026 for another Egyptian, Mohamed Salah, to exceed Fawzi's tally.

Player	Goals	1934	1990	2018	2026
Mohamed Salah	3			2	1
Abdulrahman Fawzi	2	2			
Emam Ashour	2				2
Mostafa Ziko	2				2
Magdi Abdelghani	1		1		
Yasser Ibrahim	1				1
Mahmoud Saber	1				1
Trézéguet	1				1
Total	13	2	1	2	8

== See also ==
- African nations at the FIFA World Cup
- Egypt at the Africa Cup of Nations
