= 1990 FIFA World Cup Group F =

Football tournament details

Play in Group F of the 1990 FIFA World Cup completed on 21 June 1990. England won the group and advanced to the second round, along with the Republic of Ireland and the Netherlands. Egypt failed to advance. This group has the record (along with the 1982 Group 1) of the most draws (five) of any "group round" in World Cup history. Both the Republic of Ireland and the Netherlands advanced but finished with identical records—with identical points, goal difference, goals scored, as well as drawing with each other—resulting in the drawing of lots to determine their position.

== Standings ==
Pos	Team	Pld	W	D	L	GF	GA	GD	Pts	Qualification
1	England	3	1	2	0	2	1	+1	4	Advance to knockout stage
2	Republic of Ireland	3	0	3	0	2	2	0	3 (Note: The Republic of Ireland and the Netherlands finished with identical records. With both teams assured of progressing, they were split by the drawing of lots to determine second and third place.)	Advance to knockout stage
3	Netherlands	3	0	3	0	2	2	0	3	Advance to knockout stage
4	Egypt	3	0	2	1	1	2	−1	2	

Source: FIFA
Rules for classification: Group stage tiebreakers

== Matches ==
All times local (CEST/UTC+2)

=== England vs Republic of Ireland ===
11 June 1990
21:00

England	1–1	Republic of Ireland
Lineker 9'		Sheedy 73'

Stadio Sant'Elia, Cagliari
Attendance: 35,238
Referee: Aron Schmidhuber (West Germany)

England	Republic of Ireland

GK	1	Peter Shilton
RB	2	Gary Stevens
CB	6	Terry Butcher
CB	5	Des Walker
LB	3	Stuart Pearce
RM	8	Chris Waddle
CM	19	Paul Gascoigne
CM	7	Bryan Robson (c)
LM	11	John Barnes
CF	9	Peter Beardsley		(substituted off) 69'
CF	10	Gary Lineker		(substituted off) 83'
Substitutes:
GK	13	Chris Woods
DF	12	Paul Parker
MF	16	Steve McMahon	(yellow card) 75'	(substituted on) 69'
MF	17	David Platt
FW	21	Steve Bull		(substituted on) 83'
Manager:
(England) Bobby Robson

GK	1	Packie Bonner
RB	2	Chris Morris
CB	4	Mick McCarthy (c)
CB	5	Kevin Moran
LB	3	Steve Staunton
RM	8	Ray Houghton
CM	7	Paul McGrath
CM	13	Andy Townsend
LM	11	Kevin Sheedy
CF	9	John Aldridge	(substituted off) 64'
CF	10	Tony Cascarino
Substitutes:
GK	22	Gerry Peyton
DF	12	David O'Leary
MF	14	Chris Hughton
FW	17	Niall Quinn
MF	21	Alan McLoughlin	(substituted on) 64'
Manager:
(England) Jack Charlton

Assistant referees:
Erik Fredriksson (Sweden)
Kurt Röthlisberger (Switzerland)

=== Netherlands vs Egypt ===
12 June 1990
21:00

Netherlands	1–1	Egypt
Kieft 58'		Abdelghani 83' (pen.)

Stadio La Favorita, Palermo
Attendance: 33,288
Referee: Emilio Soriano Aladrén (Spain)

Netherlands	Egypt

GK	1	Hans van Breukelen
RB	2	Berry van Aerle
CB	4	Ronald Koeman
CB	13	Graeme Rutjes
LB	5	Adri van Tiggelen
DM	3	Frank Rijkaard
CM	6	Jan Wouters
CM	10	Ruud Gullit (c)
RW	8	Gerald Vanenburg		(substituted off) 46'
LW	7	Erwin Koeman		(substituted off) 69'
CF	9	Marco van Basten
Substitutes:
GK	16	Joop Hiele
MF	11	Richard Witschge		(substituted on) 69'
FW	12	Wim Kieft	(yellow card) 58'	(substituted on) 46'
FW	14	John van 't Schip
MF	20	Aron Winter
Manager:
Leo Beenhakker

GK	1	Ahmed Shobair
DF	2	Ibrahim Hassan
DF	3	Rabie Yassin
DF	4	Hany Ramzy
DF	5	Hesham Yakan
DF	13	Ahmed Ramzy	(yellow card) 55'	(substituted off) 69'
MF	7	Ismail Youssef
MF	8	Magdi Abdelghani
FW	9	Hossam Hassan
FW	10	Gamal Abdelhamid (c)		(substituted off) 69'
FW	20	Ahmed El-Kass
Substitutes:
GK	21	Ayman Taher
DF	15	Saber Eid
MF	16	Magdy Tolba		(substituted on) 69'
MF	18	Osama Orabi
FW	19	Adel Abdelrahman		(substituted on) 69'
Manager:
Mahmoud El-Gohary

Assistant referees:
Edgardo Codesal (Mexico)
Juan Daniel Cardellino (Uruguay)

=== England vs Netherlands ===
16 June 1990
21:00

England	0–0	Netherlands

Stadio Sant'Elia, Cagliari
Attendance: 35,267
Referee: Zoran Petrović (Yugoslavia)

England	Netherlands

GK	1	Peter Shilton
SW	14	Mark Wright
CB	5	Des Walker
CB	6	Terry Butcher
RWB	12	Paul Parker
LWB	3	Stuart Pearce
RM	8	Chris Waddle	(substituted off) 58'
CM	7	Bryan Robson (c)	(substituted off) 64'
CM	19	Paul Gascoigne
LM	11	John Barnes
CF	10	Gary Lineker
Substitutes:
GK	13	Chris Woods
DF	2	Gary Stevens
MF	16	Steve McMahon
MF	17	David Platt	(substituted on) 64'
FW	21	Steve Bull	(substituted on) 58'
Manager:
Bobby Robson

GK	1	Hans van Breukelen
RB	2	Berry van Aerle
CB	4	Ronald Koeman
CB	3	Frank Rijkaard
LB	5	Adri van Tiggelen
CM	6	Jan Wouters
CM	10	Ruud Gullit (c)
CM	11	Richard Witschge
RF	14	John van 't Schip	(substituted off) 74'
CF	9	Marco van Basten
LF	17	Hans Gillhaus
Substitutes:
GK	16	Joop Hiele
FW	12	Wim Kieft	(substituted on) 74'
DF	13	Graeme Rutjes
MF	20	Aron Winter
DF	21	Danny Blind
Manager:
Leo Beenhakker

Assistant referees:
Mohamed Hansal (Algeria)
Edgardo Codesal (Mexico)

=== Republic of Ireland vs Egypt ===
17 June 1990
17:00

Republic of Ireland	0–0	Egypt

Stadio La Favorita, Palermo
Attendance: 33,288
Referee: Marcel van Langenhove (Belgium)

Republic of Ireland	Egypt

GK	1	Packie Bonner
RB	2	Chris Morris	(yellow card) 51'
CB	4	Mick McCarthy (c)
CB	5	Kevin Moran
LB	3	Steve Staunton
RM	8	Ray Houghton
CM	7	Paul McGrath
CM	13	Andy Townsend
LM	11	Kevin Sheedy
CF	9	John Aldridge		(substituted off) 64'
CF	10	Tony Cascarino		(substituted off) 84'
Substitutions:
GK	22	Gerry Peyton
DF	12	David O'Leary
MF	14	Chris Hughton
FW	17	Niall Quinn		(substituted on) 84'
MF	21	Alan McLoughlin		(substituted on) 64'
Manager:
(England) Jack Charlton

GK	1	Ahmed Shobair	(yellow card) 77'
RB	2	Ibrahim Hassan
CB	4	Hany Ramzy
CB	5	Hesham Yakan
LB	3	Rabie Yassin
RM	18	Osama Orabi
CM	7	Ismail Youssef
CM	8	Magdi Abdelghani (c)
LM	16	Magdy Tolba		(substituted off) 60'
SS	20	Ahmed El-Kass		(substituted off) 76'
CF	9	Hossam Hassan
Substitutions:
GK	21	Ayman Taher
FW	10	Gamal Abdelhamid		(substituted on) 76'
FW	12	Taher Abouzeid		(substituted on) 60'
DF	15	Saber Eid
FW	19	Adel Abdelrahman
Manager:
Mahmoud El-Gohary

Assistant referees:
Joël Quiniou (France)
Rosario Lo Bello (Italy)

=== England vs Egypt ===
21 June 1990
21:00

England	1–0	Egypt
Wright 58'

Stadio Sant'Elia, Cagliari
Attendance: 34,959
Referee: Kurt Röthlisberger (Switzerland)

England	Egypt

GK	1	Peter Shilton (c)
RB	12	Paul Parker
CB	5	Des Walker
CB	14	Mark Wright
LB	3	Stuart Pearce
RM	8	Chris Waddle		(substituted off) 86'
CM	16	Steve McMahon
CM	19	Paul Gascoigne
LM	11	John Barnes
CF	21	Steve Bull		(substituted off) 84'
CF	10	Gary Lineker
Substitutes:
GK	13	Chris Woods
MF	4	Neil Webb
DF	6	Terry Butcher
FW	9	Peter Beardsley	(yellow card) 85'	(substituted on) 84'
MF	17	David Platt		(substituted on) 86'
Manager:
Bobby Robson

GK	1	Ahmed Shobair
DF	2	Ibrahim Hassan	(yellow card) 47'
DF	3	Rabie Yassin
DF	4	Hany Ramzy
DF	5	Hesham Yakan
DF	13	Ahmed Ramzy
MF	7	Ismail Youssef
MF	8	Magdi Abdelghani	(yellow card) 38'
FW	9	Hossam Hassan
FW	10	Gamal Abdelhamid (c)		(substituted off) 77'
FW	20	Ahmed El-Kass		(substituted off) 77'
Substitutes:
GK	21	Ayman Taher
FW	11	Tarek Soliman		(substituted on) 77'
DF	15	Saber Eid
MF	18	Osama Orabi
FW	19	Adel Abdelrahman		(substituted on) 77'
Manager:
Mahmoud El-Gohary

Assistant referees:
Berny Ulloa Morera (Costa Rica)
Edgardo Codesal (Mexico)

=== Republic of Ireland vs Netherlands ===
21 June 1990
21:00

Republic of Ireland	1–1	Netherlands
Quinn 71'		Gullit 11'

Stadio La Favorita, Palermo
Attendance: 33,288
Referee: Michel Vautrot (France)

Republic of Ireland	Netherlands

GK	1	Packie Bonner
RB	2	Chris Morris
CB	4	Mick McCarthy (c)
CB	5	Kevin Moran
LB	3	Steve Staunton
RM	8	Ray Houghton
CM	7	Paul McGrath
CM	13	Andy Townsend
LM	11	Kevin Sheedy	(substituted off) 62'
CF	9	John Aldridge	(substituted off) 62'
CF	17	Niall Quinn
Substitutes:
GK	22	Gerry Peyton
MF	6	Ronnie Whelan	(substituted on) 62'
FW	10	Tony Cascarino	(substituted on) 62'
DF	12	David O'Leary
MF	16	John Sheridan
Manager:
(England) Jack Charlton

GK	1	Hans van Breukelen
RB	2	Berry van Aerle
CB	4	Ronald Koeman
CB	3	Frank Rijkaard	(yellow card) 43'
LB	5	Adri van Tiggelen
CM	6	Jan Wouters
CM	10	Ruud Gullit (c)
CM	11	Richard Witschge		(substituted off) 58'
RF	12	Wim Kieft		(substituted off) 78'
CF	9	Marco van Basten
LF	17	Hans Gillhaus
Substitutes:
GK	16	Joop Hiele
FW	14	John van 't Schip
MF	15	Bryan Roy
MF	18	Henk Fräser		(substituted on) 58'
FW	19	John van Loen		(substituted on) 78'
Manager:
Leo Beenhakker

Assistant referees:
Richard Lorenc (Australia)
Mohamed Hansal (Algeria)

== See also ==
- Egypt at the FIFA World Cup
- England at the FIFA World Cup
- Republic of Ireland at the FIFA World Cup
- Netherlands at the FIFA World Cup
