= 1999 Korea Cup squads =

These are the squads for the 1999 Korea Cup in South Korea, which took place from 12 June to 19 June 1999. The players' listed age is their age on the tournament's opening day (12 June 1999).

== Croatia ==
Head coach: Miroslav Blažević

| No. | Pos. | Player | Date of birth (age) | Caps | Club |
|---|---|---|---|---|---|
| 1 | GK | Stipe Pletikosa | 8 January 1979 (aged 20) | | (Croatia) Hajduk Split |
| 2 | DF | Daniel Šarić | 4 August 1972 (aged 26) | | Croatia Zagreb |
| 3 | DF | Anthony Šerić | 15 January 1979 (aged 20) | | (Croatia) Hajduk Split |
| 4 | DF | Stjepan Tomas | 6 March 1976 (aged 23) | | Croatia Zagreb |
| 5 | MF | Jurica Vranješ | 31 January 1980 (aged 19) | | (Croatia) Osijek |
| 6 | DF | Mario Cvitanović | 6 May 1975 (aged 24) | | Croatia Zagreb |
| 7 | MF | Jasmin Agić | 26 December 1974 (aged 24) | | (Croatia) Rijeka |
| 8 | MF | Igor Bišćan | 4 May 1978 (aged 21) | | Croatia Zagreb |
| 9 | FW | Davor Vugrinec | 24 March 1975 (aged 24) | | (Turkey) Trabzonspor |
| 10 | MF | Ivan Leko | 7 February 1978 (aged 21) | | (Croatia) Hajduk Split |
| 11 | FW | Igor Cvitanović | 1 November 1970 (aged 28) | | (Spain) Real Sociedad |
| 12 | GK | Mario Galinović | 15 November 1976 (aged 22) | | (Croatia) Osijek |
| 13 | DF | Josip Bulat | 18 March 1972 (aged 27) | | (Croatia) Hajduk Split |
| 14 | DF | Darko Miladin | 1 April 1979 (aged 20) | | (Croatia) Hajduk Split |
| 17 | FW | Josip Šimić | 16 September 1977 (aged 21) | | Croatia Zagreb |
| | FW | Mate Baturina | 1 August 1973 (aged 25) | | (Croatia) Hajduk Split |
| | FW | Nino Bule | 19 March 1976 (aged 23) | | Croatia Zagreb |
| | MF | Renato Pilipović | 14 January 1977 (aged 22) | | (Croatia) Rijeka |
| | FW | Stanko Bubalo | 26 April 1973 (aged 26) | | (Croatia) Osijek |
| | MF | Milan Rapaić | 16 August 1973 (aged 25) | | (Italy) Perugia |

== Egypt ==
Head coach: Mahmoud El-Gohary

| No. | Pos. | Player | Date of birth (age) | Caps | Club |
|---|---|---|---|---|---|
| 1 | GK | Nader El-Sayed | 13 December 1972 (aged 26) | | (Belgium) Club Brugge |
| 2 | DF | Ibrahim Hassan | 10 August 1966 (aged 32) | | (Egypt) Al-Ahly |
| 3 | DF | Abdel-Zaher El-Saqua | 30 January 1974 (aged 25) | | (Egypt) El Mansoura SC |
| 4 | MF | Sami El-Sheshini | 23 January 1972 (aged 27) | | (Egypt) Al-Zamalek |
| 5 | DF | Hany Ramzy | 10 March 1969 (aged 30) | | (Germany) 1. FC Kaiserslautern |
| 6 | DF | Mehdat Abdelhadi | 12 June 1974 (aged 25) | | (Egypt) Al-Zamalek |
| 7 | DF | Mohamed Youssef | 9 October 1970 (aged 28) | | (Egypt) Al-Ahly |
| 8 | FW | Khaled Bebo | 6 October 1976 (aged 22) | | (Egypt) Ismaily |
| 9 | FW | Hossam Hassan | 10 August 1966 (aged 32) | | (Egypt) Al-Ahly |
| 10 | MF | Abdel Sattar Sabry | 19 June 1974 (aged 24) | | (Austria) Tirol Innsbruck |
| 11 | DF | Yasser Rayyan | 25 March 1970 (aged 29) | | (Egypt) Al-Ahly |
| 12 | MF | Hady Khashaba | 19 December 1972 (aged 26) | | (Egypt) Al-Ahly |
| 13 | FW | Abdul Hamid Bassiouny | 12 March 1972 (aged 27) | | (Egypt) Al-Zamalek |
| 14 | MF | Hazem Emam | 10 May 1975 (aged 24) | | (Netherlands) De Graafschap |
| 16 | GK | Essam El-Hadary | 15 January 1973 (aged 26) | | (Egypt) Al-Ahly |
| 17 | MF | Ahmed Hassan | 2 May 1975 (aged 24) | | (Turkey) Kocaelispor |
| 20 | MF | Tarek Mostafa | 1 April 1971 (aged 28) | | (Egypt) Al-Zamalek |
| 21 | DF | Hossam Abdelmoneim | 12 February 1975 (aged 24) | | (Egypt) Al-Zamalek |
| | MF | Walid Salah El-Din | 27 October 1971 (aged 27) | | (Egypt) Al-Ahly |
| | DF | Besheer El-Tabei | 24 February 1976 (aged 23) | | (Egypt) Al-Zamalek |

== South Korea ==
Head coach: Huh Jung-moo

| No. | Pos. | Player | Date of birth (age) | Caps | Club |
|---|---|---|---|---|---|
| 1 | GK | Kim Byung-ji | 8 April 1970 (aged 29) | | (South Korea) Ulsan Hyundai Horang-i |
| 2 | MF | Choi Sung-yong | 25 December 1975 (aged 23) | | (Japan) Vissel Kobe |
| 3 | DF | Lee Ki-hyung | 28 September 1974 (aged 24) | | (South Korea) Suwon Samsung Bluewings |
| 4 | DF | Kang Chul | 2 November 1971 (aged 27) | | (South Korea) Sangmu FC |
| 5 | DF | Choi Yoon-yeol | 17 April 1974 (aged 25) | | (South Korea) Jeonnam Dragons |
| 6 | MF | Kim Do-kyun | 13 January 1977 (aged 22) | | (South Korea) Ulsan Hyundai Horang-i |
| 7 | DF | Kim Tae-young | 8 November 1970 (aged 28) | | (South Korea) Jeonnam Dragons |
| 8 | MF | Yoon Jung-hwan | 16 February 1973 (aged 26) | | (South Korea) Bucheon SK |
| 9 | FW | Kim Do-hoon | 21 July 1970 (aged 28) | | (Japan) Vissel Kobe |
| 10 | MF | Noh Jung-yoon | 28 March 1971 (aged 28) | | (Japan) Cerezo Osaka |
| 11 | MF | Seo Jung-won | 17 December 1970 (aged 28) | | (France) Strasbourg |
| 12 | FW | Park Sung-bae | 28 November 1975 (aged 23) | | (South Korea) Jeonbuk Hyundai Dinos |
| 13 | DF | Park Jin-sub | 11 March 1977 (aged 22) | | (South Korea) Sangmu FC |
| 14 | MF | Seo Dong-won | 14 August 1975 (aged 23) | | (South Korea) Daejeon Citizen |
| 15 | DF | Lee Sang-hun | 11 October 1975 (aged 23) | | (South Korea) Anyang LG Cheetahs |
| 16 | DF | Lee Young-pyo | 23 April 1977 (aged 22) | | (South Korea) Konkuk University |
| 17 | MF | Ha Seok-ju | 20 February 1968 (aged 31) | | (Japan) Vissel Kobe |
| 18 | FW | Hwang Sun-hong | 14 July 1968 (aged 30) | | (Japan) Cerezo Osaka |
| 19 | FW | Ahn Jung-hwan | 27 January 1976 (aged 23) | | (South Korea) Busan Daewoo Royals |
| 20 | DF | Hong Myung-bo | 12 February 1969 (aged 30) | | (Japan) Kashiwa Reysol |
| 21 | GK | Lee Woon-jae | 26 April 1973 (aged 26) | | (South Korea) Suwon Samsung Bluewings |
| 22 | MF | Ko Jong-soo | 30 October 1978 (aged 20) | | (South Korea) Suwon Samsung Bluewings |

== Mexico ==
Head coach: Manuel Lapuente

| No. | Pos. | Player | Date of birth (age) | Caps | Club |
|---|---|---|---|---|---|
| 1 | GK | Jorge Campos | 15 October 1966 (aged 32) | | (Mexico) UNAM |
| 2 | DF | Claudio Suárez | 17 December 1968 (aged 30) | | (Mexico) Guadalajara |
| 3 | DF | Joel Sánchez | 17 August 1974 (aged 24) | | (Mexico) Guadalajara |
| 4 | DF | Rafael Márquez | 13 February 1979 (aged 20) | | (Mexico) Atlas |
| 5 | MF | Gerardo Torrado | 30 April 1979 (aged 20) | | (Mexico) UNAM |
| 6 | MF | Raúl Lara | 28 February 1973 (aged 26) | | (Mexico) América |
| 7 | MF | Ramón Ramírez | 5 December 1969 (aged 29) | | (Mexico) América |
| 8 | MF | Alberto García Aspe | 11 May 1967 (aged 32) | | (Mexico) América |
| 9 | MF | Paulo Chávez | 7 January 1976 (aged 23) | | (Mexico) Guadalajara |
| 10 | FW | Cuauhtémoc Blanco | 17 January 1973 (aged 26) | | (Mexico) América |
| 11 | FW | Daniel Osorno | 16 March 1979 (aged 20) | | (Mexico) Atlas |
| 12 | GK | Óscar Pérez Rojas | 1 February 1973 (aged 26) | | (Mexico) Cruz Azul |
| 13 | MF | Pável Pardo | 26 July 1976 (aged 22) | | (Mexico) Tecos |
| 14 | DF | Isaac Terrazas | 23 June 1973 (aged 25) | | (Mexico) América |
| 15 | FW | Luis Hernández | 22 December 1968 (aged 30) | | (Mexico) UANL |
| 16 | DF | Salvador Cabrera | 21 August 1973 (aged 25) | | (Mexico) Necaxa |
| 17 | FW | Francisco Palencia | 28 April 1973 (aged 26) | | (Mexico) Cruz Azul |
| 18 | DF | Salvador Carmona | 22 August 1975 (aged 23) | | (Mexico) Toluca |
| 19 | MF | Miguel Zepeda | 25 May 1976 (aged 23) | | (Mexico) Atlas |
| 20 | MF | Rafael García Torres | 14 August 1974 (aged 24) | | (Mexico) Toluca |
| 21 | FW | Sergio Almaguer | 16 May 1969 (aged 30) | | (Mexico) Necaxa |
| 22 | GK | Adolfo Ríos | 11 December 1966 (aged 32) | | (Mexico) Necaxa |

== See also ==
- 1999 Korea Cup
