= Shobeir =

Shobeir or Shobair (Arabic: شوبير) is an Arabic surname that may refer to the following notable people:

- Ahmed Shobair (born 1960), Egyptian football goalkeeper
- Mostafa Shobeir (born 2000), Egyptian football goalkeeper, son of Ahmed
