= Korea Cup (international) =

- Organiser(s): Korea Football Association
- Founded: 1971
- Abolished: 1999
- Region: International
- Most championships: South Korea (12 titles)

The Korea Cup (Korean: 코리아컵 국제축구대회, lit. Korea Cup International Football Tournament) was an international football tournament held annually in South Korea from 1971 to 1999.

== History ==
The Korea Cup was founded as President's Cup Football Tournament by the Korea Football Association in 1971, (Note: Korean: 박대통령컵 쟁탈 아시아축구대회, lit. President Park's Cup Asian Football Tournament; simply known as Park's Cup.) and was contested between South Korea national team and Asian teams to develop them. It was renamed as President Park's Cup Football Tournament in 1976, and teams from other continents also started taking part from that year. It was renamed President's Cup Football Tournament in 1979, (Note: Korean: 대통령배 국제축구대회, lit. President's Cup International Football Tournament; simply known as President's Cup.) and President's Cup International Football Tournament in 1987. The latest Korea Cup appeared in 1995.

== Summary ==
Edition	Year	Champions	Runners-up	Third place	Fourth place	Teams
1	1971	South Korea; Burma	—	Indonesia	Malaysia	8
2	1972	Burma	Indonesia	South Korea	Malaysia	8
3	1973	Burma; Khmer Republic	—	South Korea	Malaysia	6
4	1974	South Korea	(Indonesia) PSMS Medan	Burma	Khmer Republic	7
5	1975	South Korea	Burma	(Iran) Homa	Japan B	8
6	1976	South Korea (Brazil) São Paulo U21 (state)	—	South Korea B	New Zealand	10
7	1977	(Brazil) São Paulo U21 (state)	South Korea	Malaysia; Thailand	—	9
8	1978	South Korea	(United States) Washington Diplomats	South Korea B	(Morocco) AS FAR	15
9	1979	(Brazil) Vitória-ES	South Korea	Bahrain	South Korea B	10
10	1980	South Korea	Indonesia	South Korea B	Thailand B	6
11	1981	South Korea (Argentina) Racing (C)	—	(Brazil) Vitória-ES	(Uruguay) Danubio	12
12	1982	South Korea (Brazil) Operário-MS	—	(Netherlands) PSV Eindhoven	(South Korea) Hallelujah FC	10
13	1983	(Netherlands) PSV Eindhoven	South Korea	Ghana	United States	11
14	1984	(Brazil) Bangu	(South Korea) Hallelujah FC	South Korea	(West Germany) Bayer Leverkusen	8
15	1985	South Korea	South Korea B	(Brazil) Bangu	Iraq	12
16	1987	South Korea	Australia	South Korea B Egypt	No third place match	12
17	1988	Czechoslovakia XI	Soviet Union XI	South Korea	(Nigeria) Iwuanyanwu Nationale	16
18	1989	Czechoslovakia	(Denmark) Brøndby IF	South Korea	(Portugal) Benfica	8
19	1991	South Korea	Egypt	Australia; Soviet Union B	No third place match	8
20	1993	Egypt	South Korea	(Czech Republic) Czechoslovakia XI; Romania XI	No third place match	8
21	1995	Ecuador	Zambia	South Korea; Costa Rica	No third place match	8
22	1997	South Korea	FR Yugoslavia	Egypt	Ghana	4
23	1999	Croatia	Mexico	South Korea	Egypt	4

== Statistics ==
=== Titles by team ===
Team	Champions	Runners-up
South Korea	12 (1971*, 1974, 1975, 1976*, 1978, 1980, 1981*, 1982*, 1985, 1987, 1991, 1997)	4 (1977, 1979 ,1983, 1993)
Burma	3 (1971*, 1972, 1973*)	1 (1975)
(Brazil) São Paulo U21 (state)	2 (1976*, 1977)	—
Egypt	1 (1993)	1 (1991)
Khmer Republic	1 (1973*)	—
(Brazil) Vitória-ES	1 (1979)	—
(Argentina) Racing (C)	1 (1981*)	—
(Brazil) Operário-MS	1 (1982*)	—
(Netherlands) PSV Eindhoven	1 (1983)	—
(Brazil) Bangu	1 (1984)	—
Czechoslovakia XI	1 (1988)	—
Czechoslovakia	1 (1989)	—
Ecuador	1 (1995)	—
Croatia	1 (1999)	—
Indonesia	—	2 (1972, 1980)
(Indonesia) PSMS Medan	—	1 (1974)
(United States) Washington Diplomats	—	1 (1978)
South Korea B	—	1 (1984)
(South Korea) Hallelujah FC	—	1 (1985)
Australia	—	1 (1987)
Soviet Union XI	—	1 (1988)
(Denmark) Brøndby	—	1 (1989)
Zambia	—	1 (1995)
FR Yugoslavia	—	1 (1997)
Mexico	—	1 (1999)

=== Titles by nation ===
Nation	Champions	Runners-up
South Korea	12 (1971*, 1974, 1975, 1976*, 1978, 1980, 1981*, 1982*, 1985, 1987, 1991, 1997)	6 (1977, 1979 ,1983, 1984, 1985, 1993)
Brazil	5 (1976*, 1977, 1979, 1982*, 1984)	—
(Myanmar) Burma	3 (1971*, 1972, 1973*)	1 (1975)
Czechoslovakia	2 (1988, 1989)	—
Egypt	1 (1993)	1 (1991)
(Cambodia) Khmer Republic	1 (1973*)	—
Argentina	1 (1981*)	—
Netherlands	1 (1983)	—
Ecuador	1 (1995)	—
Croatia	1 (1999)	—
Indonesia	—	3 (1972, 1974, 1980)
United States	—	1 (1978)
Australia	—	1 (1987)
Soviet Union	—	1 (1988)
Denmark	—	1 (1989)
Zambia	—	1 (1995)
(Federal Republic of Yugoslavia) FR Yugoslavia	—	1 (1997)
Mexico	—	1 (1999)

=== All-time table ===
Team	Part	Pld	W	D	L	GF	GA	GD	Pts
South Korea	23	125	86	25	14	290	77	+213	283
South Korea B	11	51	21	11	19	67	66	+1	74
Burma	6	29	16	7	6	48	21	+27	55
Thailand	15	56	12	15	29	70	103	–33	51
Egypt	5	22	11	8	3	36	21	+15	41
Malaysia	9	37	11	6	20	52	78	–26	39
(Brazil) São Paulo U21 (state)	3	15	11	3	1	34	4	+30	36
(Netherlands) PSV Eindhoven	2	12	10	1	1	39	10	+29	31
(Brazil) Vitória-ES	2	13	9	3	1	30	8	+22	30
Indonesia	9	37	8	5	24	57	85	–28	29
Australia	2	11	7	4	0	19	5	+14	25
(Brazil) Bangu	2	12	5	7	0	22	9	+13	22
Iraq	2	11	6	2	3	27	16	+11	20
Bahrain	5	21	5	5	11	22	47	–25	20
Czechoslovakia XI	2	10	5	3	2	14	10	+4	18
(South Korea) Hallelujah FC	2	11	5	3	3	17	15	+2	18
(Argentina) Racing (C)	1	7	5	2	0	19	7	+12	17
New Zealand	3	13	5	2	6	13	15	–2	17
Khmer Republic	4	16	4	5	7	14	29	–15	17
Soviet Union XI	1	6	5	0	1	10	2	+8	15
(Brazil) Operário-MS	1	6	4	2	0	13	7	+6	14
Czechoslovakia	1	5	4	1	0	12	4	+8	13
Ecuador	1	5	4	1	0	10	4	+6	13
(Uruguay) Danubio	1	7	4	1	2	9	7	+2	13
United States	3	15	3	4	8	19	28	–9	13
(United States) Washington Diplomats	1	6	4	0	2	15	12	+3	12
Malta	2	8	3	3	2	10	8	+2	12
(Iran) Homa	1	6	3	2	1	9	3	+6	11
Zambia	2	8	3	1	4	8	14	–6	10
(Iran) PAS Tehran	1	4	3	0	1	8	4	+4	9
(Denmark) Brøndby	1	5	3	0	2	8	4	+4	9
(Germany) Saarbrücken	1	5	3	0	2	7	9	–2	9
Hungary XI	2	9	2	3	4	8	11	–3	9
Ghana	3	11	3	0	8	14	19	–5	9
Sudan	2	8	2	2	4	7	18	–11	8
Malaysia B	3	12	1	5	6	10	28	–18	8
(Socialist Federal Republic of Yugoslavia) Velež Mostar	1	4	2	1	1	8	6	+2	7
(Mexico) Atlas	1	4	2	1	1	7	5	+2	7
(Italy) Genoa	1	5	2	1	2	9	10	–1	7
(Nigeria) Iwuanyanwu Nationale	1	6	2	1	3	8	9	–1	7
(Morocco) AS FAR	1	6	2	1	3	7	8	–1	7
Thailand B	1	5	2	1	2	7	8	–1	7
Canada	1	5	2	1	2	5	9	–4	7
Japan B	2	9	1	4	4	5	12	–7	7
Mexico XI	1	3	2	0	1	9	4	+5	6
(Uruguay) Central Español	1	5	1	3	1	5	4	+1	6
Morocco	1	5	2	0	3	6	6	0	6
Nigeria	1	5	1	3	1	5	5	0	6
Japan	1	5	2	0	3	4	4	0	6
(Netherlands) Fortuna Sittard	1	5	1	3	1	5	8	–3	6
(Portugal) Benfica	1	5	2	0	3	6	11	–5	6
Lebanon	2	6	2	0	4	9	16	–7	6
Singapore	2	8	2	0	6	10	23	–13	6
FR Yugoslavia	1	3	1	2	0	4	2	+2	5
Croatia	1	3	1	2	0	5	4	+1	5
Romania XI	1	4	1	2	1	7	7	0	5
(Argentina) Deportivo Español	1	5	1	2	2	6	9	–3	5
Chile B	1	5	1	2	2	3	6	–3	5
(Indonesia) PSMS Medan	1	4	1	2	1	3	8	–5	5
(West Germany) Bayer Leverkusen	2	9	1	2	6	8	16	–8	5
Indonesia B	2	8	1	2	5	3	21	–18	5
India	3	12	1	2	9	6	25	–19	5
Mexico	1	3	1	1	1	4	3	+1	4
Costa Rica	1	4	1	1	2	5	5	0	4
Turkey Olympic	1	3	1	1	1	3	4	–1	4
(Argentina) Gimnasia y Esgrima (LP)	1	3	1	1	1	3	4	–1	4
(South Korea) Yukong Elephants	1	4	1	1	2	4	6	–2	4
Soviet Union B	1	4	1	1	2	3	5	–2	4
Liechtenstein	1	5	1	1	3	4	8	–4	4
(Argentina) Huracán	1	5	1	1	3	6	12	–6	4
United States Olympic (Note: The Olympic team could consist of only non-professional players until 1980, and the United States was having a professional league at that time.)	1	3	1	0	2	7	7	0	3
(Peru) Alianza Lima	1	3	0	3	0	3	3	0	3
Hong Kong	1	3	1	0	2	3	4	–1	3
(Uruguay) Nacional	1	3	1	0	2	2	3	–1	3
(Brazil) Rio de Janeiro XI	1	3	1	0	2	2	5	–3	3
Hungary U21	1	3	1	0	2	1	5	–4	3
(Lebanon) Racing Beirut	1	4	1	0	3	8	14	–6	3
(England) Middlesex Wanderers	1	4	1	0	3	4	10	–6	3
Bangladesh	1	4	1	0	3	4	16	–12	3
(Belgium) Mechelen	1	3	0	2	1	3	4	–1	2
(Sweden) Trelleborg	1	3	0	2	1	3	5	–2	2
(England) Queens Park Rangers	1	3	0	2	1	2	5	–3	2
(Belgium) Cercle Brugge	1	3	0	2	1	2	6	–4	2
(Indonesia) Warna Agung	1	4	0	2	2	1	5	–4	2
(Mexico) Atlante	1	3	0	2	1	0	4	–4	2
Australia B	1	3	0	1	2	3	5	–2	1
United States U21	1	3	0	1	2	2	4	–2	1
(Peru) Sporting Cristal	1	3	0	1	2	4	7	–3	1
United States Universiade	1	3	0	1	2	4	7	–3	1
Guatemala	1	3	0	1	2	0	4	–4	1
(Republic of Ireland) Shamrock Rovers	1	5	0	1	4	0	4	–4	1
(Scotland) Kilmarnock	1	3	0	1	2	4	9	–5	1
(Italy) Serie C U21	1	3	0	1	2	3	8	–5	1
(West Germany) Eintracht Frankfurt	1	3	0	1	2	2	7	–5	1
China U20	1	3	0	1	2	1	6	–5	1
(France) Châteauroux	1	5	0	1	4	5	12	–7	1
(Malaysia) Perak	1	4	0	1	3	4	11	–7	1
Bahrain B	1	5	0	1	4	3	11	–8	1
(Belgium) Lierse	1	2	0	0	2	5	8	–3	0
Sri Lanka	1	4	0	0	4	1	11	–10	0
South Vietnam	1	3	0	0	3	1	13	–12	0
Philippines	1	4	0	0	4	0	22	–22	0

== Awards ==
=== Most Valuable Player ===
Year	Player	Team
1991	(South Korea) Ha Seok-ju	South Korea
1993	(Egypt) Ahmed Shobair	Egypt
1995	(Ecuador) Energio Díaz	Ecuador
1997	(South Korea) Ha Seok-ju	South Korea
1999	(Croatia) Josip Šimić	Croatia

=== Top goalscorer ===
Year	Player	Team	Goals
1971	(Indonesia) Iswadi Idris	Indonesia	7
1972	(Indonesia) Abdul Kadir	Indonesia	6
1973	(South Korea) Kim Jin-kook	South Korea	3
1973	(South Korea) Kim Jae-han	South Korea	3
1973	(Malaysia) R. Visvanathan	Malaysia	3
1973	(South Korea) Cha Bum-kun	South Korea	3
1974	(South Korea) Park Lee-chun	South Korea	6
1975	Unknown		
1976	(South Korea) Cha Bum-kun	South Korea	7
1977	(South Korea) Cha Bum-kun	South Korea	6
1978	(South Korea) Kim Jae-han	South Korea	6
1979	(Brazil) João Francisco	(Brazil) Vitória-ES	8
1980	(South Korea) Chung Hae-won	South Korea	7
1981	(Brazil) João Francisco	(Brazil) Vitória-ES	6
1982	(Netherlands) Ruud Geels	(Netherlands) PSV Eindhoven	7
1983	(Netherlands) Jurrie Koolhof	(Netherlands) PSV Eindhoven	6
1984	(Brazil) Paulinho Criciúma	(Brazil) Bangu	5
1985	(Iraq) Karim Saddam	Iraq	6+ (Note: Scored at least six goals.)
1987	(Australia) Frank Farina	Australia	4
1988	(Czechoslovakia) Milan Luhový	Czechoslovakia XI	4
1988	(Mexico) Alberto Mariscal	(Mexico) Atlas	4
1988	(South Korea) Choi Soon-ho	South Korea	4
1989	(Czechoslovakia) Pavel Černý	Czechoslovakia	5
1991	(South Korea) Ha Seok-ju	South Korea	4
1993	(South Korea) Cho Jin-ho	South Korea B	3
1995	(Ecuador) Eduardo Hurtado	Ecuador	5
1997	(Federal Republic of Yugoslavia) Rade Bogdanović	FR Yugoslavia	2
1997	(South Korea) Choi Moon-sik	South Korea	2
1997	(South Korea) Seo Jung-won	South Korea	2
1997	(Federal Republic of Yugoslavia) Slaviša Jokanović	FR Yugoslavia	2
1999	(Mexico) Daniel Osorno	Mexico	2

== See also ==
- South Korea national football team
- South Korea national football B team
- Korea Football Association
- Peace Cup
