= 1993 President's Cup International Football Tournament =

1993 President's Cup
Tournament details
- Host country: South Korea
- Dates: 19–28 June
- Teams: 8

Final positions
- Champions: Egypt (1st title)
- Runners-up: South Korea

Tournament statistics
- Matches played: 15
- Goals scored: 37 (2.47 per match)
- Top scorer: (South Korea) Cho Jin-ho (3 goals)
- Best player: (Egypt) Ahmed Shobair

The 1993 President's Cup International Football Tournament (Korean: 제20회 대통령배 국제축구대회) was the 20th competition of Korea Cup. It was held from 19 to 28 June 1993, and was won by Egypt for the first time.

== Group stage ==
=== Group A ===
Team	Pld	W	D	L	GF	GA	GD	Pts
Egypt	3	2	1	0	5	2	+3	5
South Korea	3	2	0	1	8	2	+6	4
(Mexico) Atlante	3	0	2	1	0	4	–4	2
China U20 (Note: Participated as under-20 team to prepare for the 1996 Summer Olympics.)	3	0	1	2	1	6	–5	1

19 June 1993
16:30 UTC+9

South Korea	1–2	Egypt
Seo Jung-won 55'	Report 1 Report 2	Ezzat 22', 54'

Seoul Olympic Stadium, Seoul
Attendance: 21,725
Referee: Russamee Jindamai (Thailand)

19 June 1993

Atlante (Mexico)	0–0	China U20
	Report

Seoul Olympic Stadium, Seoul

21 June 1993

Egypt	3–1	China U20
Gamal (?); Sokhib (?)	Report

Palma Sports Complex, Suncheon

21 June 1993
19:00 UTC+9

South Korea	4–0	(Mexico) Atlante
Hwangbo Kwan 1'; Park Jung-bae 42'; Kim Jung-hyuk 63'; Jung Jae-kwon 86'	Report

Palma Sports Complex, Suncheon

23 June 1993

Egypt	0–0	(Mexico) Atlante
	Report

Changwon Stadium, Changwon

23 June 1993
19:00 UTC+9

South Korea	3–0	China U20
Kim Jung-hyuk 16'; Choi Moon-sik 57' (pen.); Seo Jung-won 84'	Report

Changwon Stadium, Changwon

=== Group B ===
Team	Pld	W	D	L	GF	GA	GD	Pts
(Czech Republic) Czechoslovakia XI (Note: Czechoslovakia was dissolved in January 1993, but its 1992–93 season was proceeded normally. Slovak players also participated in the Korea Cup after finishing the league.)	3	2	1	0	4	2	+2	5
Romania XI	3	1	2	0	4	3	+1	4
South Korea B	3	0	2	1	5	6	–1	2
Australia B	3	0	1	2	3	5	–2	1

20 June 1993

South Korea B	2–2	Romania XI
Cho Jin-ho 18', 90' (pen.)	Report; Highlights	Marian 38', 58'

Gangneung Stadium, Gangneung

20 June 1993

Czechoslovakia XI (Czech Republic)	1–0	Australia B

Gangneung Stadium, Gangneung

22 June 1993

Czechoslovakia XI (Czech Republic)	1–1	Romania XI
	Report

Suwon Sports Complex, Suwon

22 June 1993

South Korea B	2–2	Australia B
Han Jung-kook 1'; Park Kun-ha 21'	Report; Highlights	Van Egmond 86'; Bingley 89'

Suwon Sports Complex, Suwon

24 June 1993

Romania XI	2–1	Australia B
	Report

Ulsan Public Stadium, Ulsan

24 June 1993

South Korea B	1–2	(Czech Republic) Czechoslovakia XI
Cho Jin-ho (?)	Report	Diňa 26' (?)

Ulsan Public Stadium, Ulsan

== Knockout stage ==
=== Bracket ===
Semi-finals
26 June – Busan
(Czech Republic) Czechoslovakia XI	0
South Korea	1
26 June – Busan
Egypt	3
Romania XI	2

Final
28 June – Seoul
South Korea	0
Egypt	1

=== Semi-finals ===
26 June 1993
16:30 UTC+9

Czechoslovakia XI (Czech Republic)	0–1	South Korea
	Report	Jung Jae-kwon 75'

Busan Gudeok Stadium, Busan

26 June 1993

Egypt	3–2	Romania XI
	Report

Busan Gudeok Stadium, Busan

=== Final ===
28 June 1993
19:00 UTC+9

South Korea	0–1	Egypt
	Report 1 Report 2	Reda 86'

Seoul Olympic Stadium, Seoul
Attendance: 25,591
Referee: Nick Ahmad Yacoub (?)

== See also ==
- Korea Cup
- South Korea national football team results
