= 1984 President's Cup Football Tournament =

1984 President's Cup
Tournament details
- Host country: South Korea
- Dates: 30 May – 8 June
- Teams: 8

Final positions
- Champions: (Brazil) Bangu (1st title)
- Runners-up: (South Korea) Hallelujah FC
- Third place: South Korea
- Fourth place: (West Germany) Bayer Leverkusen

Tournament statistics
- Matches played: 16
- Goals scored: 40 (2.5 per match)
- Attendance: 146,000 (9,125 per match)
- Top scorer: (Brazil) Paulinho Criciúma (5 goals)

The 1984 President's Cup Football Tournament (Korean: 제14회 대통령배 국제축구대회) was the 14th competition of Korea Cup. The competition was held from 30 May to 8 June 1984, and was won by a Brazilian club Bangu for the first time, who defeated Hallelujah FC in the final. It attracted a total of 146,000 spectators.

== Group stage ==
=== Group A ===
Team	Pld	W	D	L	GF	GA	GD	Pts	Qualification
South Korea	3	2	1	0	7	4	+3	5	Qualification to semi-finals
(West Germany) Bayer Leverkusen	3	1	1	1	5	4	+1	3	Qualification to semi-finals
(Peru) Alianza Lima	3	0	3	0	3	3	0	3	
Guatemala	3	0	1	2	0	4	−4	1	

30 May 1984
18:00 KST

South Korea	3–2	(West Germany) Bayer Leverkusen
Lee Tae-ho 40', 87'; Byun Byung-joo 83'	Report	Winklhofer 39'; Hoerster 82'

Dongdaemun Stadium, Seoul

30 May 1984
19:50 KST

Alianza Lima (Peru)	0–0	Guatemala

Dongdaemun Stadium, Seoul

1 June 1984
15:00 KST

Bayer Leverkusen (West Germany)	2–0	Guatemala

Gwangju Mudeung Stadium, Gwangju

1 June 1984
16:50 KST

South Korea	2–2	(Peru) Alianza Lima
Byun Byung-joo 42'; Kim Jong-boo 75'	Report	Velásquez 55'; La Rosa 76'

Gwangju Mudeung Stadium, Gwangju

3 June 1984
17:00 KST

Bayer Leverkusen (West Germany)	1–1	(Peru) Alianza Lima
Reinhardt ?'	Report	La Rosa ?'

Busan Gudeok Stadium, Busan

3 June 1984
18:50 KST

South Korea	2–0	Guatemala
Lee Tae-ho 58'; Lee Tae-hyung 62'	Report

Busan Gudeok Stadium, Busan

=== Group B ===
Team	Pld	W	D	L	GF	GA	GD	Pts	Qualification
(Brazil) Bangu	3	2	1	0	8	0	+8	5	Qualification to semi-finals
(South Korea) Hallelujah FC	3	1	2	0	3	1	+2	4	Qualification to semi-finals
(Belgium) Cercle Brugge	3	0	2	1	2	6	–4	2	
Thailand	3	0	1	2	1	7	–6	1	

31 May 1984
17:00 KST

Bangu (Brazil)	4–0	Thailand
Perivaldo 25', 56', 61' (pen.); Paulinho 41'	Report

Dongdaemun Stadium, Seoul

31 May 1984
18:50 KST

Hallelujah FC (South Korea)	1–1	(Belgium) Cercle Brugge
Byun Il-woo 83'	Report	Frank 60'

Dongdaemun Stadium, Seoul

2 June 1984
17:00 KST

Cercle Brugge (Belgium)	1–1	Thailand

Daegu Civic Stadium, Daegu

2 June 1984
18:50 KST

Hallelujah FC (South Korea)	0–0	(Brazil) Bangu

Daegu Civic Stadium, Daegu

4 June 1984
17:00 KST

Cercle Brugge (Belgium)	0–4	(Brazil) Bangu
		Paulinho ?', ?'; Perivaldo ?'; Polozzi ?'

Busan Gudeok Stadium, Busan

4 June 1984
18:50 KST

Hallelujah FC (South Korea)	2–0	Thailand
Oh Seok-jae 6'; Park Sung-hwa 76'	Report

Busan Gudeok Stadium, Busan

== Knockout stage ==
=== Bracket ===
Semi-finals
7 June – Seoul
South Korea	1
(South Korea) Hallelujah FC (a.e.t.)	2
7 June – Seoul
(Brazil) Bangu (p)	1 (4)
(West Germany) Bayer Leverkusen	1 (2)

Final
9 June – Seoul
(South Korea) Hallelujah FC	1
(Brazil) Bangu	2
Third place play-off
9 June – Seoul
South Korea	2
(West Germany) Bayer Leverkusen	1

=== Semi-finals ===
7 June 1984
17:00 KST

South Korea	1–2 (a.e.t.)	(South Korea) Hallelujah FC
Chung Hae-won 60' (pen.)	Report	Byun Il-woo 55'; Kim Jung-hee 111'

Dongdaemun Stadium, Seoul

7 June 1984
18:50 KST

Bangu (Brazil)	1–1 (a.e.t.)	(West Germany) Bayer Leverkusen
Marinho 55'	Report	Cha Bum-kun 5'
Penalties
	4–2

Dongdaemun Stadium, Seoul

=== Third place play-off ===
9 June 1984
17:00 KST

South Korea	2–1	(West Germany) Bayer Leverkusen
Kim Sam-soo 35'; Lee Kil-yong 61'	Report	Kohn 89'

Dongdaemun Stadium, Seoul

=== Final ===
9 June 1984
18:50 KST

Hallelujah FC (South Korea)	1–2	(Brazil) Bangu
Oh Seok-jae 51'	Report; Newscast	Paulinho 52', 81'

Dongdaemun Stadium, Seoul

== See also ==
- Korea Cup
- South Korea national football team results
