= Perivaldo =

Brazilian footballer

Personal information
- Full name: Perivaldo Lúcio Dantas
- Date of birth: 12 July 1953
- Place of birth: Itabuna, Brazil
- Date of death: 27 July 2017 (aged 64)
- Place of death: Rio de Janeiro, Brazil
- Position: Right back

Senior career*
Years	Team	Apps	(Gls)
1973–1974	Itabuna		
1975–1976	Bahia	28	(2)
1977–1982	Botafogo	89	(13)
1981	→ São Paulo (loan)		
1983	Palmeiras	13	(1)
1984–1986	Bangu	12	(0)
1987	Yukong Elephants	1	(0)

International career
1981–1982	Brazil	2	(0)
- * Club domestic league appearances and goals

Perivaldo Lúcio Dantas (12 July 1953 – 27 July 2017), known simply as Perivaldo, was a Brazilian footballer who played as a right back.

== Football career ==
Born in Itabuna, Bahia, Perivaldo started his career with local amateurs Itabuna Esporte Clube. In 1975 he moved straight to the Série A where he would remain until his retirement, starting with Esporte Clube Bahia.

In his country's top flight Perivaldo also represented Botafogo de Futebol e Regatas, São Paulo FC, Sociedade Esportiva Palmeiras and Bangu Atlético Clube. He scored seven goals for the first in only 13 appearances in the 1982 season, helping it finish in 18th position amongst 44 teams.

Perivaldo earned two caps for Brazil. In the late 80s, after living three years in South Korea, he relocated to Portugal in hopes of finding a new club, but eventual poor choices and several misfortunes ended up with him as a homeless person having to resort to street vending in Lisbon.

Perivaldo returned to his homeland on 11 December 2013 at the age of 60, with the help of the Portuguese Professional Footballers Union. He had been subjected to a three-week follow-up by Portuguese TV channel SIC, and that and posterior footage resulted in the making of a documentary.

== Death ==
Perivaldo died on 27 July 2017 at the age of 64 in Rio de Janeiro, victim of pneumonia.

== See also ==
- Bola de Ouro
- 1984 President's Cup Football Tournament
- List of foreign K League Classic players
