= Egypt at the Africa Cup of Nations =

Since the establishment of the Africa Cup of Nations, Egypt has been a frequent participant, having played in 26 of 34 AFCON editions, the most of all participants in African history. The Egyptians won the inaugural 1957, and successfully defended it two years later. However, Egypt had to wait until 1986 to win it for the third time. During this era of early participation, Egypt frequently entered to the semi-finals and at least gained runners-up or third place. However, after 1986, Egypt would have a poor era from 1988 to 1996 when the team was knocked out from the group stage and quarter-finals. In 1998, Egypt successfully conquered its fourth trophy.

However, it was the 2000s that witnessed the most successful Egyptian side in AFCON, as Egypt won the tournament back to back from 2006 to 2010, expanding their result to seven, an African record. Egypt then missed three AFCON editions from 2012 to 2015, before returning in 2017, where the Pharaohs almost conquered its eighth title until a 1–2 loss to Cameroon in the final. Egypt would again reach the final in 2021, this time losing on penalties to Senegal.

Egypt is also the country that hosted the most AFCON editions, five times. Three of them ended with Egypt being crowned champions. The 2019 edition was hosted by Egypt, but the Pharaohs had a dismal performance, lost to South Africa, another former AFCON champion, 0–1, right at home turf in the round of sixteen in spite of three group stage wins.

== Overall record ==
Africa Cup of Nations record										Africa Cup of Nations qualification record					
Year	Round	Position	Pld	W	D*	L	GF	GA	Squad	Pld	W	D	L	GF	GA
(Sudan) 1957	Champions	1st	2	2	0	0	6	1	Squad	No Qualification					
(United Arab Republic) 1959	Champions	1st	2	2	0	0	6	1	Squad	No Qualification					
(Ethiopia) 1962	Runners-up	2nd	2	1	0	1	4	5	Squad	Qualified as defending champions					
(Ghana) 1963	Semi-finals	3rd	3	2	1	0	11	5	Squad	–	–	–	–	–	–
(Tunisia) 1965	Withdrew after qualifying									–	–	–	–	–	–
(Ethiopia) 1968	Withdrew									3	2	1	0	6	4
(Sudan) 1970	Semi-finals	3rd	5	3	1	1	10	5	Squad	2	1	1	0	2	1
(Cameroon) 1972	Did not qualify									4	3	0	1	6	6
(Egypt) 1974	Semi-finals	3rd	5	4	0	1	13	5	Squad	Qualified as hosts					
(Ethiopia) 1976	Semi-finals	4th	6	1	2	3	9	12	Squad	4	3	1	0	11	3
(Ghana) 1978	Did not qualify									2	0	1	1	4	5
(Nigeria) 1980	Semi-finals	4th	5	2	1	2	6	7	Squad	2	1	0	1	4	3
(Libya) 1982	Withdrew									2	2	0	0	7	3
(Ivory Coast) 1984	Semi-finals	4th	5	2	2	1	6	6	Squad	4	2	1	1	3	2
(Egypt) 1986	Champions	1st	5	3	1	1	5	1	Squad	Qualified as hosts					
(Morocco) 1988	Group stage	6th	3	1	1	1	3	1	Squad	Qualified as defending champions					
(Algeria) 1990	Group stage	8th	3	0	0	3	1	6	Squad	4	2	1	1	8	2
(Senegal) 1992	Group stage	11th	2	0	0	2	0	2	Squad	6	3	3	0	13	5
(Tunisia) 1994	Quarter-finals	5th	3	1	1	1	4	1	Squad	6	2	2	2	6	5
(South Africa) 1996	Quarter-finals	7th	4	2	0	2	5	6	Squad	10	6	3	1	24	5
(Burkina Faso) 1998	Champions	1st	6	4	1	1	10	1	Squad	6	2	3	1	12	4
(Ghana) (Nigeria) 2000	Quarter-finals	5th	4	3	0	1	7	3	Squad	Qualified as defending champions					
(Mali) 2002	Quarter-finals	6th	4	2	0	2	3	3	Squad	6	4	1	1	11	6
(Tunisia) 2004	Group stage	9th	3	1	1	1	3	3	Squad	4	3	0	1	14	1
(Egypt) 2006	Champions	1st	6	4	2	0	12	3	Squad	Qualified as hosts					
(Ghana) 2008	Champions	1st	6	5	1	0	15	5	Squad	6	3	3	0	9	2
(Angola) 2010	Champions	1st	6	6	0	0	15	2	Squad	13	9	1	3	22	7
(Equatorial Guinea) (Gabon) 2012	Did not qualify									6	1	2	3	5	5
(South Africa) 2013	Did not qualify									2	0	1	1	3	4
(Equatorial Guinea) 2015	Did not qualify									6	2	0	4	5	6
(Gabon) 2017	Runners-up	2nd	6	3	2	1	5	3	Squad	4	3	1	0	7	1
(Egypt) 2019	Round of 16	10th	4	3	0	1	5	1	Squad	6	4	1	1	16	5
(Cameroon) 2021	Runners-up	2nd	7	3	3	1	4	2	Squad	6	3	3	0	10	3
(Ivory Coast) 2023	Round of 16	12th	4	0	4	0	7	7	Squad	6	5	0	1	10	3
(Morocco) 2025	Qualified									6	4	2	0	12	2
(Kenya) (Tanzania) (Uganda) 2027	To be determined									To be determined					
Total	7 Titles	27/35	111	60	24	27	175	97		125	70	31	24	229	92

== Egypt's matches ==
Year	Date	Location	Stages	Opponent	Result	Egypt scorers
(Sudan) 1957	10 February 1957	Khartoum	Semi-finals	Sudan	2–1	
(Sudan) 1957	15 February 1957	Khartoum	Final	Ethiopia	4–0	
(United Arab Republic) 1959	22 May 1959	Cairo	Final phase	Ethiopia	4–0	
(United Arab Republic) 1959	29 May 1959	Cairo	Final phase	Sudan	2–1	
(Ethiopia) 1962	18 January 1962	Addis Ababa	Semi-finals	Uganda	2–1	
(Ethiopia) 1962	21 January 1962	Addis Ababa	Final	Ethiopia	2–4	
(Ghana) 1963	24 November 1963	Kumasi	Group stage	Nigeria	6–3	
(Ghana) 1963	26 November 1963	Kumasi	Group stage	Sudan	2–2	
(Ghana) 1963	30 November 1963	Accra	Third place	Ethiopia	3–0	
(Sudan) 1970	7 February 1970	Wad Medani	Group stage	Guinea	4–1	
(Sudan) 1970	9 February 1970	Wad Medani	Group stage	Ghana	1–1	
(Sudan) 1970	11 February 1970	Wad Medani	Group stage	Congo-Kinshasa	1–0	
(Sudan) 1970	14 February 1970	Khartoum	Semi-finals	Sudan	1–2 (a.e.t.)	
(Sudan) 1970	16 February 1970	Khartoum	Third place	Ivory Coast	3–1	
(Egypt) 1974	1 March 1974	Cairo	Group stage	Uganda	2–1	
(Egypt) 1974	4 March 1974	Cairo	Group stage	Zambia	3–1	
(Egypt) 1974	6 March 1974	Cairo	Group stage	Ivory Coast	2–0	
(Egypt) 1974	9 March 1974	Cairo	Semi-finals	Zaire	2–3	
(Egypt) 1974	11 March 1974	Cairo	Third place	Congo	4–0	
(Ethiopia) 1976	29 February 1976	Addis Ababa	First round	Guinea	1–1	
(Ethiopia) 1976	3 March 1976	Addis Ababa	First round	Uganda	2–1	
(Ethiopia) 1976	6 March 1974	Addis Ababa	First round	Ethiopia	1–1	
(Ethiopia) 1976	9 March 1974	Addis Ababa	Final round	Morocco	1–2	
(Ethiopia) 1976	11 March 1974	Addis Ababa	Final round	Guinea	2–4	
(Ethiopia) 1976	14 March 1974	Addis Ababa	Final round	Nigeria	2–3	
(Nigeria) 1980	8 March 1980	Lagos	Group stage	Ivory Coast	2–1	
(Nigeria) 1980	12 March 1980	Lagos	Group stage	Tanzania	2–1	
(Nigeria) 1980	15 March 1980	Lagos	Group stage	Nigeria	0–1	
(Nigeria) 1980	19 March 1980	Ibadan	Semi-finals	Algeria	2–2 (2–4 p)	
(Nigeria) 1980	21 March 1980	Lagos	Third place	Morocco	0–2	
(Ivory Coast) 1984	4 March 1984	Abidjan	Group stage	Cameroon	1–0	
(Ivory Coast) 1984	7 March 1984	Abidjan	Group stage	Ivory Coast	2–1	
(Ivory Coast) 1984	10 March 1984	Abidjan	Group stage	Togo	0–0	
(Ivory Coast) 1984	14 March 1984	Abidjan	Semi-finals	Nigeria	2–2 (7–8 p)	
(Ivory Coast) 1984	17 March 1984	Abidjan	Third place	Algeria	1–3	
(Egypt) 1986	7 March 1986	Cairo	Group stage	Senegal	0–1	
(Egypt) 1986	10 March 1986	Cairo	Group stage	Ivory Coast	2–0	
(Egypt) 1986	13 March 1986	Cairo	Group stage	Mozambique	2–0	
(Egypt) 1986	17 March 1986	Cairo	Semi-finals	Morocco	1–0	
(Egypt) 1986	21 March 1986	Cairo	Final	Cameroon	0–0 (5–4 p)	
(Morocco) 1988	14 March 1988	Rabat	Group stage	Cameroon	0–1	
(Morocco) 1988	17 March 1988	Rabat	Group stage	Kenya	3–0	
(Morocco) 1988	20 March 1988	Rabat	Group stage	Nigeria	0–0	
(Algeria) 1990	2 March 1990	Algiers	Group stage	Ivory Coast	1–3	
(Algeria) 1990	5 March 1990	Algiers	Group stage	Nigeria	0–1	
(Algeria) 1990	8 March 1990	Algiers	Group stage	Algeria	0–2	
(Senegal) 1992	13 January 1992	Ziguinchor	Group stage	Zambia	0–1	
(Senegal) 1992	17 January 1992	Ziguinchor	Group stage	Ghana	0–1	
(Tunisia) 1994	28 March 1994	Tunis	Group stage	Gabon	4–0	
(Tunisia) 1994	30 March 1994	Tunis	Group stage	Nigeria	0–0	
(Tunisia) 1994	2 April 1994	Tunis	Quarter-finals	Mali	0–1	
(South Africa) 1996	15 January 1996	Johannesburg	Group stage	Angola	2–1	
(South Africa) 1996	18 January 1996	Johannesburg	Group stage	Cameroon	1–2	
(South Africa) 1996	24 January 1996	Johannesburg	Group stage	South Africa	1–0	
(South Africa) 1996	27 January 1996	Bloemfontein	Quarter-finals	Zambia	1–3	
(Burkina Faso) 1998	10 February 1998	Bobo-Dioulasso	Group stage	Mozambique	2–0	
(Burkina Faso) 1998	13 February 1998	Bobo-Dioulasso	Group stage	Zambia	4–0	
(Burkina Faso) 1998	17 February 1998	Ouagadougou	Group stage	Morocco	0–1	
(Burkina Faso) 1998	21 February 1998	Ouagadougou	Quarter-finals	Ivory Coast	0–0 (5–4 p)	
(Burkina Faso) 1998	25 February 1998	Bobo-Dioulasso	Semi-finals	Burkina Faso	2–0	
(Burkina Faso) 1998	28 February 1998	Ouagadougou	Final	South Africa	2–0	
(Ghana) (Nigeria) 2000	23 January 2000	Kano	Group stage	Zambia	2–0	
(Ghana) (Nigeria) 2000	28 January 2000	Kano	Group stage	Senegal	1–0	
(Ghana) (Nigeria) 2000	2 February 2000	Kano	Group stage	Burkina Faso	4–2	
(Ghana) (Nigeria) 2000	7 February 2000	Kano	Quarter-finals	Tunisia	0–1	
(Mali) 2002	20 January 2002	Bamako	Group stage	Senegal	0–1	
(Mali) 2002	25 January 2002	Bamako	Group stage	Tunisia	1–0	
(Mali) 2002	31 January 2002	Bamako	Group stage	Zambia	2–1	
(Mali) 2002	4 February 2002	Sikasso	Quarter-finals	Cameroon	0–1	
(Tunisia) 2004	25 January 2004	Sfax	Group stage	Zimbabwe	2–1	
(Tunisia) 2004	29 January 2004	Sousse	Group stage	Algeria	1–2	
(Tunisia) 2004	3 February 2004	Monastir	Group stage	Cameroon	0–0	
(Egypt) 2006	20 January 2006	Cairo	Group stage	Libya	3–0	
(Egypt) 2006	24 January 2006	Cairo	Group stage	Morocco	0–0	
(Egypt) 2006	28 January 2006	Cairo	Group stage	Ivory Coast	3–1	
(Egypt) 2006	3 February 2006	Cairo	Quarter-finals	DR Congo	4–1	
(Egypt) 2006	7 February 2006	Cairo	Semi-finals	Senegal	2–1	
(Egypt) 2006	10 February 2006	Cairo	Final	Ivory Coast	0–0 (4–2 p)	
(Ghana) 2008	22 January 2008	Kumasi	Group stage	Cameroon	4–2	
(Ghana) 2008	26 January 2008	Kumasi	Group stage	Sudan	3–0	
(Ghana) 2008	30 January 2008	Kumasi	Group stage	Zambia	1–1	
(Ghana) 2008	4 February 2008	Kumasi	Quarter-finals	Angola	2–1	
(Ghana) 2008	7 February 2008	Kumasi	Semi-finals	Ivory Coast	4–1	
(Ghana) 2008	10 February 2008	Accra	Final	Cameroon	1–0	
(Angola) 2010	12 January 2010	Benguela	Group stage	Nigeria	3–1	
(Angola) 2010	16 January 2010	Benguela	Group stage	Mozambique	2–0	
(Angola) 2010	20 January 2010	Benguela	Group stage	Benin	2–0	
(Angola) 2010	25 January 2010	Benguela	Quarter-finals	Cameroon	3–1 (a.e.t.)	
(Angola) 2010	28 January 2010	Benguela	Semi-finals	Algeria	4–0	
(Angola) 2010	31 January 2010	Luanda	Final	Ghana	1–0	
(Gabon) 2017	17 January 2017	Port-Gentil	Group stage	Mali	0–0	
(Gabon) 2017	21 January 2017	Port-Gentil	Group stage	Uganda	1–0	
(Gabon) 2017	25 January 2017	Port-Gentil	Group stage	Ghana	1–0	
(Gabon) 2017	29 January 2017	Port-Gentil	Quarter-finals	Morocco	1–0	
(Gabon) 2017	28 January 2017	Libreville	Semi-finals	Burkina Faso	1–1 (4–3 p)	
(Gabon) 2017	5 February 2017	Libreville	Final	Cameroon	1–2	
(Egypt) 2019	21 June 2019	Cairo	Group stage	Zimbabwe	1–0	
(Egypt) 2019	26 June 2019	Cairo	Group stage	DR Congo	2–0	
(Egypt) 2019	30 June 2019	Cairo	Group stage	Uganda	2–0	
(Egypt) 2019	6 July 2019	Cairo	Round of 16	South Africa	0–1	
(Cameroon) 2021	11 January 2022	Garoua	Group stage	Nigeria	0–1	
(Cameroon) 2021	15 January 2022	Garoua	Group stage	Guinea-Bissau	1–0	
(Cameroon) 2021	19 January 2022	Yaoundé	Group stage	Sudan	1–0	
(Cameroon) 2021	26 January 2022	Douala	Round of 16	Ivory Coast	0–0 (5–4 p)	
(Cameroon) 2021	30 January 2022	Yaoundé	Quarter-finals	Morocco	2–1 (a.e.t.)	
(Cameroon) 2021	3 February 2022	Yaoundé	Semi-finals	Cameroon	0–0 (3–1 p)	
(Cameroon) 2021	6 February 2022	Yaoundé	Final	Senegal	0–0 (2–4 p)	
(Ivory Coast) 2023	14 January 2024	Abidjan	Group stage	Mozambique	2–2	
(Ivory Coast) 2023	18 January 2024	Abidjan	Group stage	Ghana	2–2	
(Ivory Coast) 2023	22 January 2024	Abidjan	Group stage	Cape Verde	2–2	
(Ivory Coast) 2023	28 January 2024	San Pédro	Round of 16	DR Congo	1–1 (7–8 p)	

== See also ==
- Egypt at the FIFA World Cup
