= Polozzi =

Brazilian footballer

Personal information
- Full name: José Fernando Polozzi
- Date of birth: 1 October 1955 (age 71)
- Place of birth: Vinhedo, Brazil
- Position: Defender

Youth career
- 1972–1974: Ponte Preta

Senior career*
Years	Team	Apps	(Gls)
1974–1978	Ponte Preta		
1979–1982	Palmeiras		
1983	Botafogo-SP		
1984	Bangu		
1985	Palmeiras		
1986	CEOV		
1986–1988	Serrano-BA		
1988	Bandeirante		
1988	Araçatuba		
1989–1990	Linense		
1990	Serrano-BA		
1991–1992	Toledo		
1992	Tiradentes-DF		

Managerial career
- 1994: Bandeirante
- 1994: AA Votuporanguense
- 1994: Independente de Limeira
- 1995: Tupã
- 1996: Araçatuba (assistant)
- 1997: Bandeirante
- 1997: Paranavaí
- 1998: Bandeirante
- 1998: Marília
- 1999: Bandeirante
- 2000: Garça
- 2000: Inter de Limeira
- 2001: União Mogi
- 2001: Jaboticabal
- 2002: União Barbarense
- 2002: Desportiva
- 2002: Ferroviária
- 2003–2004: Jataiense
- 2004: Primavera
- 2005: Itumbiara
- 2005: Olímpia
- 2006: Bandeirante
- 2006–2007: Jataiense
- 2007: Ríver
- 2008: Ferroviário
- 2008: Alto Santo
- 2008: Parnahyba
- 2008: Francana
- 2009: Guaçuano
- 2010: Jataiense
- 2010: Confiança
- 2010: Flamengo-PI
- 2011: Votuporanguense
- 2011: Ríver
- 2011: Araguaína
- 2012: Comercial-PI
- 2013: Francana
- * Club domestic league appearances and goals

José Fernando Polozzi (born 1 October 1955 in Vinhedo, São Paulo State), best known as Polozzi, is a former Brazilian football (soccer) player in central defender role, currently managed Bandeirante's team.

== Career ==
Born in Vinhedo, Polozzi began his football career at Associação Atlética Ponte Preta under manager Mário Juliato. After Polozzi managed to become a regular in Ponte Preta's first team, he helped the club to a strong performance in the 1977 Campeonato Paulista which led to a role on Brazil's national team.

In career (1972–1992) he played for several number of clubs, including Ponte Preta, Palmeiras, Bangu, Operário (MT) and Bandeirante. He won Mato Grosso do Sul State League in 1986.

For the Brazil national football team he was included in the squad for the 1978 FIFA World Cup, but he never played in an international match.
