= Stadio Sant'Elia =

Football stadium in Cagliari, Italy

Coordinates: 39°11′57.82″N 9°8′5.83″E

Stadio Comunale Sant'Elia
- Stadio Sant'Elia
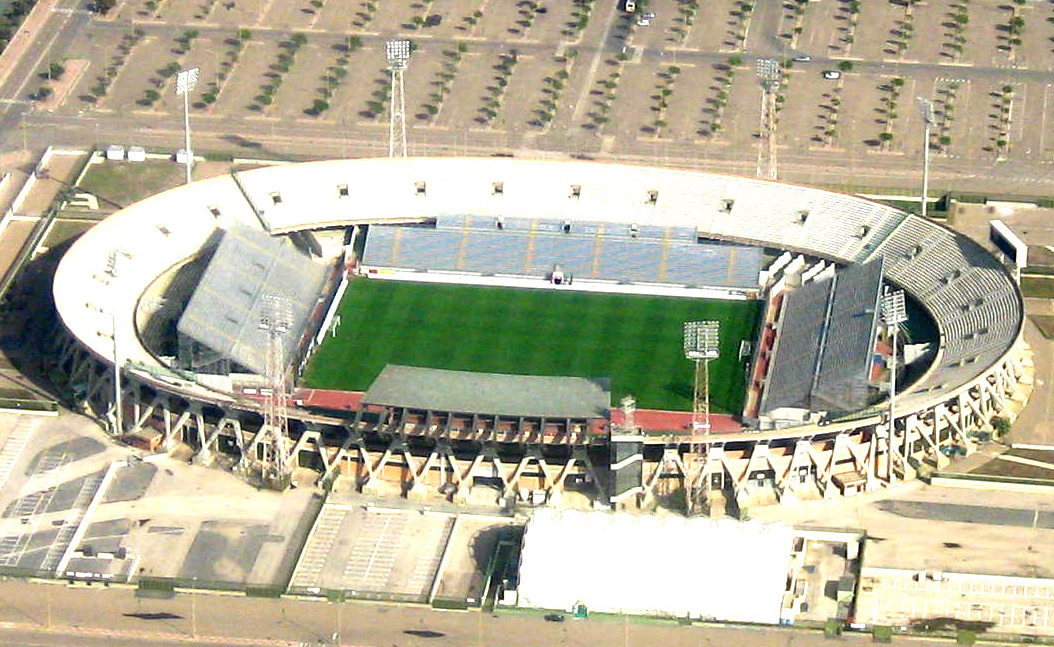
- Interactive map of Stadio Comunale Sant'Elia
- Location: Cagliari, Italy
- Owner: Municipality of Cagliari
- Capacity: 40,919 original structure / 16,000 provisional stand
- Surface: Grass; 105x66.5m

Construction
- Groundbreaking: 1965
- Opened: 1970
- Renovated: 1989, 2003, 2013
- Closed: 2017
- Demolished: 2017

Tenant
- Cagliari Calcio (1970–2017)

Stadio Comunale Sant'Elia was a football stadium in Cagliari, Italy. It is best known for having been the home of Cagliari Calcio. It hosted three matches during the 1990 FIFA World Cup. The stadium had an initial capacity of 60,000 spectators, reduced to 40,919 in 1990, and then 23,834 and finally 16,000 spectators with a provisional stand. It was closed in 2017 and the new Unipol Domus was built as a replacement.

== History ==
Its construction began in 1970, following Cagliari Calcio's first and so far only Scudetto, thus taking the place of the old Amsicora Stadium.

The stadium could accommodate up to about 60,000 spectators (the record attendance being approximately 70,000, was recorded against Saint-Étienne). The stadium subsequently underwent major changes and restructuring for the 1990 FIFA World Cup. The maximum capacity of Sant'Elia was reduced to 40,919 spectators.

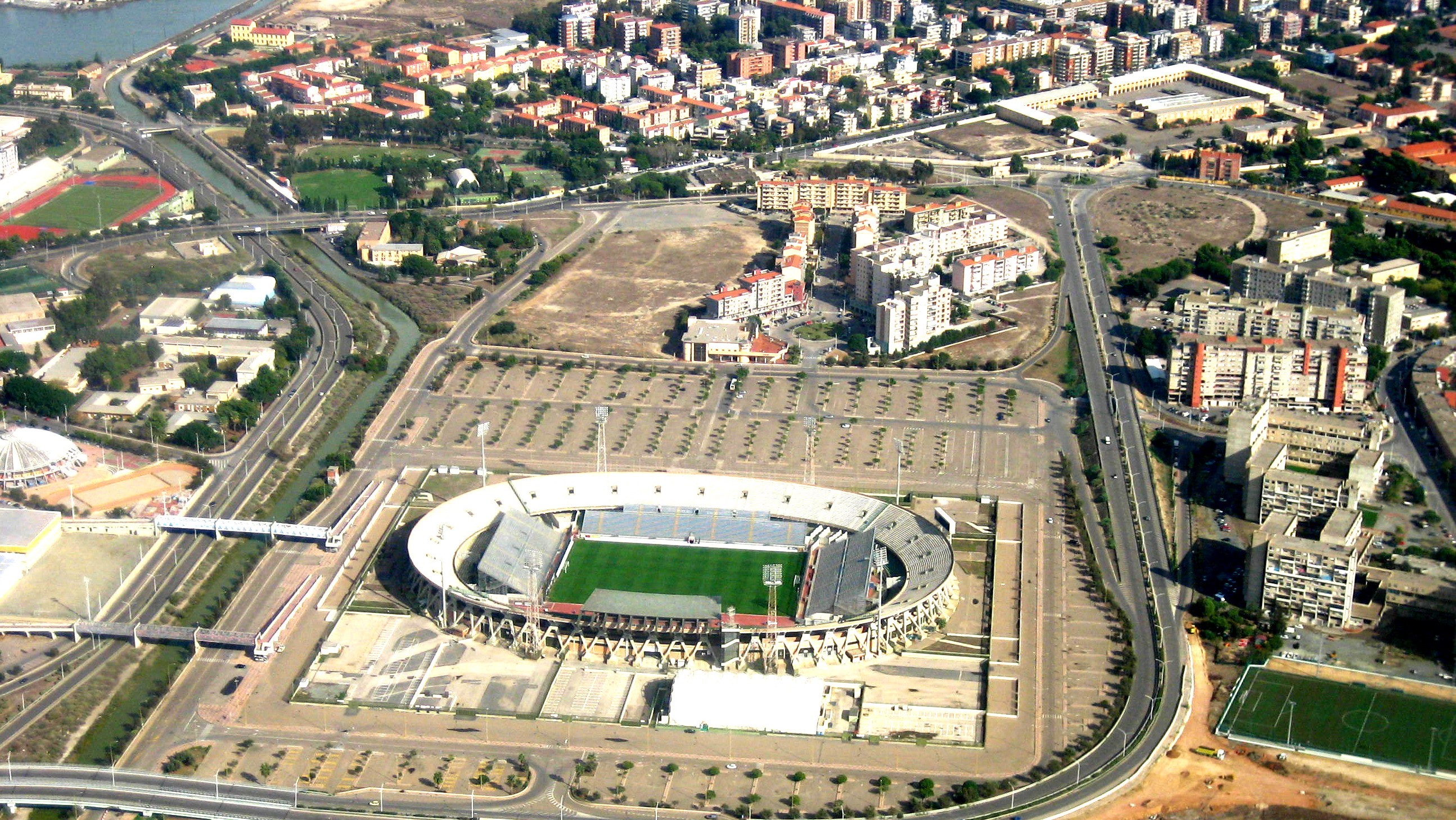
Aerial view in October 2008

The Sant'Elia was also used for sporting events outside football such as the Terra Sarda athletics meet.

Before the 2002–03 season, also due to the reduced number of fans following the poor form of the team, long reduced to yo-yoing between Serie A and B, the stadium was restructured again. Over the athletics track, a new stand was built, behind the goals so as to reduce the distance between the terrace and the playing field, with the central terraces remaining intact. The new format of the stadium, which almost halved its maximum capacity to 23,486 seats, came under harsh criticism.

Cagliari Calcio president Massimo Cellino had plans to build a new stadium for the football team to play in, however the council and mayor Emilio Floris refused to give consent for the project to go ahead, despite the fact that Cellino was willing to finance the new stadium himself.

Nonetheless, plans were drawn up and a draft was revealed in September 2007, with Cellino and Cagliari Calcio meeting all expenses. The project provided a stadium with 25,000 seats, with construction beginning in August 2009 and expected completion a year later. However, late in 2009, Cagliari Calcio proposed a revamped plan for the Karalis Arena in order to be added to the list of the Euro 2016 candidature. The new stadium would accommodate about 30,000 spectators and have new Skybox, restaurants and café.

Due to disagreements with the new local administration headed by mayor Massimo Zedda and growing safety concerns regarding the venue, Cagliari left Stadio Sant'Elia in the final weeks of the 2011–12 Serie A season, playing the remaining few home games at Stadio Nereo Rocco, Trieste. For the 2012–13 Serie A season, Cagliari played its home games outside its home city, at Stadio Comunale Is Arenas in Quartu Sant'Elena, thus ultimately putting an end to its long-standing association with Stadio Sant'Elia.

However, Cagliari cancelled their contract at Stadio Is Arenas in April 2013 after having safety issues with local authorities all season, which forced them to play behind closed doors in several matches. It was announced on 19 October 2013 that Cagliari would return to the Stadio Sant’Elia for the remainder of 2013-14 Serie A season.

On 1 August 2014, after a deal with the local council, new Cagliari President Tommaso Giulini announced that Stadio Sant’Elia would be expanded to hold at least 11,650 fans for the 2014-15 Serie A season. The goal was to reach a capacity of 16,000 (or even 18,000) by 21 December 2014 (home match against Juventus).

On 24 October 2014, the Provincial Supervision Committee gave the go-ahead for opening Curva Sud which has a capacity of 4,000 seats. Thus, it was expected that the stadium would have a total capacity of 16,000 when Cagliari Calcio took on AC Milan on 29 October.

On 18 December 2015, Cagliari Calcio presented a project of a new stadium which would have a capacity of 21,000, shops, and a restaurant. The project was approved by the local council on 21 February 2017 and by the region on 1 March 2017. Work started in April 2017 and the new stadium will be completed by 2021. From 2017, Cagliari played at the provisional Sardegna Arena until construction was completed and name changed to Unipol Domus.

In July 2022, Cagliari Calcio presented the final project for the new stadium to the Municipality of Cagliari. The completion date was aimed for the start of the 2025–26 season. On 17 November 2025, the project was approved by the Conferenza dei Servizi. On 21 December 2022, the cost of the project was estimated at €157.4m ex. VAT. However, as of 17 November 2025, estimates have risen to €187m ex. VAT. The Regional Council of Sardinia will provide €50m in funding.

== 1990 FIFA World Cup ==
The stadium was one of the venues of the 1990 FIFA World Cup. Although it was denied by local and FIFA organisers, it was widely rumoured that the stadium had been chosen for all of England's group matches as a way to control their reputation at the time for hooliganism. The following matches were held at the ground:

Date	Team No. 1	Res.	Team No. 2	Round	Attendance
11 June 1990	England	1–1	Republic of Ireland	Group F	35,238
16 June 1990	England	0–0	Netherlands	Group F	35,267
21 June 1990	England	1–0	Egypt	Group F	34,959
