= 1999 Korea Cup =

Tournament details
- Host country: South Korea
- Dates: 12–19 June
- Teams: 4

Final positions
- Champions: Croatia (1st title)
- Runners-up: Mexico

Tournament statistics
- Matches played: 6
- Goals scored: 13 (2.17 per match)
- Top scorer(s): (Mexico) Daniel Osorno (2 goals)
- Best player(s): (Croatia) Josip Šimić

The 1999 Korea Cup (Korean: 99 코리아컵 국제축구대회) was the 23rd and the last competition of Korea Cup. It was held from 12 to 19 June 1999, and was won by Croatia.

== Squads ==
Team	FIFA Ranking	Recent result	Continent
South Korea	34th place	1998 FIFA World Cup group stage 1998 Asian Games quarter-finals	AFC
Croatia	6th place	1998 FIFA World Cup 3rd place	UEFA
Mexico	13th place	1998 FIFA World Cup round of 16; 1998 CONCACAF Gold Cup champions	CONCACAF
Egypt	35th place	1998 African Cup of Nations champions	CAF

== Standings ==
Pos	Team	Pld	W	D	L	GF	GA	GD	Pts
1	Croatia (C)	3	1	2	0	5	4	+1	5
2	Mexico	3	1	1	1	4	3	+1	4
3	South Korea (H)	3	0	3	0	2	2	0	3
4	Egypt	3	0	2	1	2	4	−2	2

Source: RSSSF
(C) Champions; (H) Hosts

== Matches ==
12 June 1999
19:00 (UTC+9)

South Korea	1–1	Mexico
Ahn Jung-hwan 16'	Report	Terrazas 14'

Seoul Olympic Stadium, Seoul
Attendance: 42,840
Referee: Lu Jun (China)

13 June 1999
19:00 (UTC+9)

Croatia	2–2	Egypt
Cvitanović 45' (pen.); Vugrinec 77'	Report	H. Hassan 9'; Rayyan 34'

Dongdaemun Stadium, Seoul
Attendance: 6,900
Referee: Ahn Bong-ki (South Korea)

15 June 1999
19:00 (UTC+9)

South Korea	0–0	Egypt
	Report

Seoul Olympic Stadium, Seoul
Attendance: 37,000
Referee: Tajaddin Fares (Syria)

16 June 1999
19:00 (UTC+9)

Croatia	2–1	Mexico
Bišćan 44'; Šimić 63'	Report	Hernández 25'

Dongdaemun Stadium, Seoul
Attendance: 4,500
Referee: Kang Byung-ho (South Korea)

18 June 1999
19:00 (UTC+9)

Mexico	2–0	Egypt
Osorno 2', 88'	Report

Dongdaemun Stadium, Seoul
Attendance: 6,400
Referee: Park Hae-yong (South Korea)

19 June 1999
19:00 (UTC+9)

South Korea	1–1	Croatia
Noh Jung-yoon 58'	Report; Video	Tomas 88'

Seoul Olympic Stadium, Seoul
Attendance: 54,000
Referee: Tajaddin Fares (Syria)

== See also ==
- Korea Cup
- South Korea national football team results
