= Josip Šimić =

Croatian footballer

Personal information
- Full name: Josip Šimić
- Date of birth: 16 September 1977 (age 49)
- Place of birth: Zagreb, SR Croatia, SFR Yugoslavia
- Height: 1.82 m (6 ft 0 in)
- Position: Striker

Senior career*
Years	Team	Apps	(Gls)
1993–2000	Dinamo Zagreb	40	(17)
2000–2004	Club Brugge	39	(7)
2001–2002	→ Aris (loan)	21	(4)
2004	Ulsan Hyundai Horang-i	16	(1)
2005–2007	Kärnten	31	(9)
2007	Varteks	2	(0)

International career
1999–2000	Croatia	7	(1)
- * Club domestic league appearances and goals as of 25 September 2007

Josip Šimić (born 16 September 1977) is a retired Croatian football striker. He is the younger brother of Dario Šimić.

== Club career ==
Šimić started his professional career with Dinamo Zagreb in 1993, when the club was known as Croatia Zagreb. He was also part of the first team when they won four consecutive titles in the Croatian league between 1997 and 2000. In the 1998–1999 and 1999–2000 seasons, he also appeared in a total of 10 UEFA Champions League group matches for the club, memorably scoring the winning goal in their 1–0 away win at Ajax on 25 November 1998.

In 2000, he left his homeland to play in Belgium for Club Brugge before going on to play in the national leagues of Greece, Korea and Austria.

He returned to Croatia in 2006, signing for Varteks as a free agent upon the end of his contract with FC Kärnten. After an alleged injury problem and only a few appearances, he left Varteks in the summer of 2007.

== International career ==
Šimić was a Croatian youth international between 1993 and 2000, making over 20 international appearances at under-16 to under-21 levels. He also played for the Croatian national under-21 team at the European Under-21 Championship in 2000.

In January 1999, he appeared for Croatia B in a friendly match against France B and made his full international debut for Croatia on 13 June 1999 against Egypt at the Korea Cup, a friendly international tournament in Seoul. Three days later, he scored his only international goal in a 2–1 win against Mexico during the same tournament.

Between August and October 1999, he made three appearances as a substitute in Croatia's UEFA Euro 2000 qualifiers against Malta, the Republic of Ireland and Yugoslavia. Croatia failed to qualify for the finals after finishing third in their qualifying group. Šimić's final full international appearance came on 26 April 2000 in a friendly match against Austria. He won a total of 7 full international caps for Croatia.

=== International goal ===
#	Date	Venue	Opponent	Score	Result	Competition
01.	16 June 1999	Seoul Olympic Stadium, Seoul, South Korea	Mexico	2 – 1	2 – 1	1999 Korea Cup

== Honours ==
Dinamo Zagreb

- Prva HNL: 1996–97, 1997–98, 1998–99, 1999–00

Club Brugge

- Belgian Cup: 2001–02

Individual

- Korea Cup Most Valuable Player: 1999
