= Mostafa Shobeir =

Egyptian footballer (born 2000)

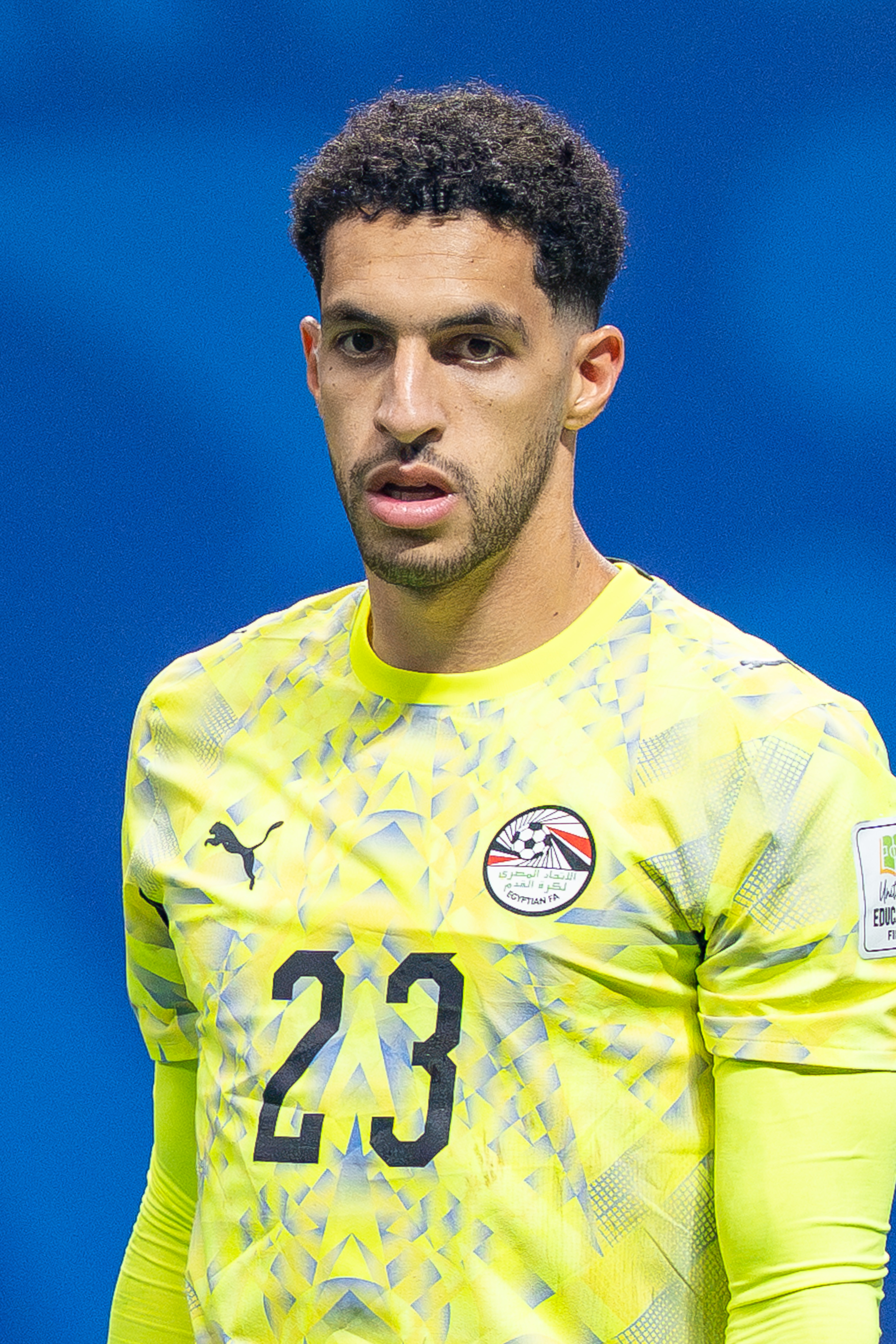
- Shobeir with Egypt in 2026

Personal information
- Full name: Mostafa Ahmed Abdelaziz Mohamed Shobeir
- Date of birth: 15 May 2000 (age 26)
- Place of birth: Giza, Egypt
- Height: 1.85 m (6 ft 1 in)
- Position: Goalkeeper

Team information
- Current team: Al Ahly
- Number: 31

Youth career
- –2020: Al Ahly

Senior career*
Years	Team	Apps	(Gls)
2019–	Al Ahly	40	(0)

International career^{‡}
	Egypt U17	1	(0)
2018	Egypt U20	1	(0)
2019–2021	Egypt U23	2	(0)
2024–	Egypt	14	(0)
- * Club domestic league appearances and goals as of 27 June 2026 (UTC) ‡ National team caps and goals as of 7 July 2026

Mostafa Ahmed Abdelaziz Mohamed Shobeir (Note: Arabic: مصطفى أحمد عبد العزيز محمد شوبير) (born 1 March 2000), also known as Mostafa Shoubir and Oufa Shobeir, is an Egyptian professional footballer who plays as a goalkeeper for Egyptian Premier League club Al Ahly and the Egypt national team.

== Club career ==
Shobeir progressed from Al Ahly's youth academy to the senior team. After serving as Mohamed El Shenawy's backup, he became a starter during the 2023–24 CAF Champions League, recording a tournament-record nine consecutive clean sheets and helping Al Ahly win the title. In September 2026, he extended his contract with Al Ahly until 2029.

== International career ==
On 2 December 2025, Shobeir was called up to the Egypt squad for the 2025 Africa Cup of Nations. He was selected as the first-choice goalkeeper for the 2026 FIFA World Cup. He saved two penalties during the tournament, denying Mehdi Taremi of Iran in the group stage and Lionel Messi of Argentina in the round of 16. Hence, he became only the fourth goalkeeper in World Cup history to save two penalties in a single tournament, after Jan Tomaszewski, Brad Friedel, and Wojciech Szczęsny.

== Personal life ==
Shobeir is the son of former Egyptian national team goalkeeper Ahmed Shobair.

== Career statistics ==
=== Club ===
As of 25 December 2021.

Club	Season	League			Cup		Continental		Other		Total	
Club	Season	Division	Apps	Goals	Apps	Goals	Apps	Goals	Apps	Goals	Apps	Goals
Al Ahly	2019–20	Egyptian Premier League	0	0	1	0	0	0	0	0	0	0
Al Ahly	2020–21	Egyptian Premier League	1	0	0	0	0	0	0	0	1	0
Al Ahly	2021–22	Egyptian Premier League	5	0	1	0	0	0	0	0	6	0
Career total			6	0	2	0	0	0	0	0	8	0

== Honours ==
Al Ahly

- Egyptian Premier League: 2019–20, 2022–23, 2023–24
- Egypt Cup: 2019–20, 2021–22, 2022–23
- Egyptian Super Cup: 2023, 2024
- CAF Champions League: 2020–21, 2022–23, 2023-24
- FIFA African–Asian–Pacific Cup: 2024
