= Ahmed Ramzy (footballer) =

Egyptian footballer (born 1965)

Personal information
- Full name: Ahmed Megahid Ramzy
- Date of birth: July 25, 1965 (age 61)
- Place of birth: Egypt

Senior career*
Years	Team	Apps	(Gls)
1985-1996	Zamalek		

International career
	Egypt	76	(12)
- * Club domestic league appearances and goals

Ahmed Megahid Ramzy (Arabic: أَحْمَد مُجَاهِد رَمْزِيّ; born July 25, 1965) is an Egyptian football player. He was Zamalek's international defender and is now the assistant manager of the club.

== Titles as a player for National Team ==
Ramzy participated in the 1990 FIFA World Cup.

== Titles as a player for Zamalek ==
- 3 Egyptian League titles
- 1 Egyptian Cup titles
- 1 Egyptian Friendship Cup
- 1 Egyptian Friendship Cup
- 2 African Champions League titles
- 1 African Super Cup
- 1 Afro-Asian Cup

== Titles as a manager for Zamalek ==
- 2 Egyptian League titles
- 1 Egyptian Cup
- 2 Egyptian Super Cup
- 1 African Champions' League title
- 1 African Cup Winners' Cup
- 1 African Super Cup (2002)
