= Adel Abdel Rahman =

Egyptian footballer (born 1967)

Adel Abdelrahman
Personal information
- Full name: Hosny Adel Abdelrahman
- Date of birth: December 11, 1967 (age 58)
- Place of birth: Egypt
- Position: Forward

Senior career*
Years	Team	Apps	(Gls)
1987–1988	Olympic Club	?	(?)
1988–1995	Al Ahly	?	(?)
1995–1995	Zamalek SC	?	(?)
1995–1997	Al Wehda FC	?	(?)

International career
1987-1990	Egypt	12	(1)

Managerial career
- 2015: Al-Shabab
- 2015: Al-Ittihad
- 2016: Al-Batin
- 2016–2017: Al-Wehda
- 2018–2019: Al Ahly (youth)
- 2019: Smouha
- * Club domestic league appearances and goals

Hosny Adel Abdel Rahman (born December 11, 1967) is an Egyptian professional football coach and former player. He was previously the manager of Al-Ittihad, Al-Shabab, Al-Batin and Al-Wehda.

One of the most memorial season of his footballing career was in 1988/89 where he won the Egyptian Premier League and Egypt Cup with Al Ahly, scoring 3 goals.

== Managerial statistics ==
=== Managerial record ===
As of match played 18 February 2017

Managerial record by team and tenure
Team	From	To	Record					Ref
Team	From	To	P	W	D	L	Win %	Ref
Al-Shabab	3 April 2015	15 May 2015	8	3	2	3	37.5	
Al-Ittihad	27 November 2015	14 December 2015	4	2	1	1	50.0	
Al-Batin	13 August 2016	3 November 2016	11	3	3	5	27.3	
Al-Wehda	23 December 2016	5 May 2017	15	3	1	11	20.0	
Total			38	11	7	20	28.9	—
