= Cho Jin-ho (footballer) =

South Korean footballer (1971–2017)

Cho Jin-ho 조진호

Personal information
- Full name: Cho Jin-ho
- Date of birth: August 2, 1971
- Place of birth: Daegu, South Korea
- Date of death: October 10, 2017 (aged 46)
- Place of death: Busan, South Korea
- Height: 1.73 m (5 ft 8 in)
- Position: Midfielder

Youth career
- 1990–1993: Kyung Hee University

Senior career*
Years	Team	Apps	(Gls)
1994–1999	Pohang Steelers	45	(4)
1997–1998	→ Sangmu FC (military service)		
2000	Bucheon SK	17	(2)
2001–2002	Seongnam Ilhwa Chunma	18	(2)

International career
1990–1993	South Korea U20	9	(3)
1994–1995	South Korea U23	4	(0)
1994–1995	South Korea	13	(2)

Managerial career
- 2013–2014: Daejeon Citizen (Caretaker)
- 2014–2015: Daejeon Citizen
- 2016: Sangju Sangmu
- 2017: Busan IPark
- * Club domestic league appearances and goals

- Cho Jin-ho
- Hangul: 조진호
- Hanja: 趙眞浩
- RR: Jo Jinho
- MR: Cho Chinho

Cho Jin-ho (August 2, 1971 – October 10, 2017) was a South Korean football player who played as a midfielder or striker for the South Korea national team.

== Career statistics ==
Scores and results list South Korea's goal tally first, score column indicates score after each Cho goal.

List of international goals scored by Cho Jin-ho
No.	Date	Venue	Opponent	Score	Result	Competition
1	1 May 1994	Seoul Olympic Stadium, Seoul, South Korea	Cameroon	2–2	2–2	Friendly
2	3 May 1994	Changwon Stadium, Changwon, South Korea	Cameroon	1–0	2–1	Friendly
