= Rabie Yassin =

Egyptian footballer and manager (born 1960)

Personal information
- Full name: Mohamed Rabie Yassin
- Date of birth: 7 September 1960 (age 66)
- Place of birth: Beni Suef, Egypt
- Height: 1.73 m (5 ft 8 in)
- Position: Left-back

Senior career*
Years	Team	Apps	(Gls)
1979–1992	Al Ahly SC	310	(16)
Total		310	(16)

International career
1982–1992	Egypt	109	(1)

Managerial career
- 1997–1998: Tanta
- 2005–2007: Smouha
- 2011–2013: Egypt U20
- 2014: Darnes
- 2019–2020: Egypt U20
- 2020–2021: Aswan
- 2021–2022: Petrojet
Medal record
Men's football
Representing Egypt (as manager)
Africa U-20 Cup of Nations
Winner	2013
- * Club domestic league appearances and goals

Mohamed Rabie Yassin (Arabic: مُحَمَّد رَبِيع يَاسِين) (born 7 September 1960) is a former Egyptian footballer and current football manager.

== Career ==
As a left back, he played and captained Al Ahly SC as well as playing and captaining the Egypt national team. He participated in the 1990 FIFA World Cup and the 1984 Summer Olympics. In 2013, as manager of the Egypt national under-20 football team, he won the 2013 African U-20 Championship, and competed in the 2013 FIFA U-20 World Cup.

== See also ==
- List of men's footballers with 100 or more international caps
