= Saber Eid =

Egyptian footballer (1959–2025)

Personal information
- Full name: Saber Eid Ali Omar
- Date of birth: 1 May 1959
- Place of birth: El Mahalla El Kubra, Egypt
- Date of death: 29 December 2025 (aged 66)
- Position: Centre-back

Senior career*
Years	Team	Apps	(Gls)
1977–1993	Ghazl El Mahalla		

International career
1989–1991	Egypt	14	(1)
- * Club domestic league appearances and goals

Saber Eid Ali Omar (Arabic: صَابِر عِيد عَلِيّ عُمَر; 1 May 1959 – 29 December 2025) was an Egyptian footballer who played as a centre-back for Ghazl El Mahalla. He played for Egypt in the 1990 FIFA World Cup.

Eid suffered from lung cancer and had tumors in his leg and in his lung. He died on 29 December 2025.
