= Hesham Yakan =

Egyptian footballer (born 1962)

Personal information
- Full name: Hesham Yakan Zaki
- Date of birth: 10 August 1962 (age 64)
- Place of birth: Cairo, Egypt
- Height: 1.80 m (5 ft 11 in)
- Position: Defender

Team information
- Current team: Eritrea (head coach)

Senior career*
Years	Team	Apps	(Gls)
1982–1995	Zamalek		

International career
1984–1993	Egypt	65	(0)

Managerial career
- 2026–: Eritrea
- * Club domestic league appearances and goals

Hesham Yakan Zaki (Arabic: هشام يكن حسين زكي; born 10 August 1962) is an Egyptian professional football coach and former player who is currently the head coach of Eritrea national football team.

== Personal life ==
He was born in Cairo, the son of football player Yaken Zaki. He came from a family of footballing traditions, his grandfather Yakan Hussein was also a football player for Zamalek and Egypt.

== Club career ==
=== Zamalek SC ===
He played as a defender for Zamalek from 1982 to 1995, winning multiple Egyptian leagues and cups during the years. He was also a member of the team that win the African Champions League and Super Cup in 1984, 1985 and 1993.

== International career ==
Yakan was a regular starter for the Egyptian national football team from 1984 to 1993. He was a member of the squad that competed in the 1990 FIFA World Cup and in the 1988 and 1992 African Cup of Nations.

== Coaching career ==
=== Eritrea ===
On 12 March 2026 Yakan was nominated the head coach of Eritrea national football team. He guided his side to victory in the 2027 Africa Cup of Nations qualification preliminary round, the first in decades for the national team.

== Career statistics ==
=== International ===
Appearances and goals by national team and year
National team	Year	Apps	Goals
Egypt	1984	1	0
Egypt	1985	1	0
Egypt	1986	–	
Egypt	1987	–	
Egypt	1988	9	0
Egypt	1989	17	0
Egypt	1990	14	0
Egypt	1991	9	0
Egypt	1992	4	0
Egypt	1993	10	0
Total		65	0

=== Managerial ===
As of 16 November 2026

Team	Nat	From	To	Record				
Team	Nat	From	To	G	W	D	L	Win %
Eritrea	(Eritrea)	12 March 2026	Present	6	2	1	3	33.33
Total				6	2	1	3	33.33
