= Osama Orabi =

Egyptian footballer (born 1962)

Personal information
- Date of birth: 25 January 1962 (age 64)
- Place of birth: Cairo, Egypt
- Height: 1.72 m (5 ft 8 in)
- Position: Midfielder

Youth career
- Al Ahly

Senior career*
Years	Team	Apps	(Gls)
1982–1999	Al Ahly		

International career
1988-1992	Egypt	15	(0)
- * Club domestic league appearances and goals

Osama Orabi (Arabic: أُسَامَة عُرَابِيّ; born 25 January 1962) is an Egyptian retired professional footballer who played as a midfielder.

== Playing career ==
=== Early career ===
As a 13-year-old boy, Orabi attempted to join Al Ahly in 1975, but did not succeed. He unsuccessfully tried out once again at Al-Ahly in 1978. In 1981, he trained for two weeks with the first team of Arab Contractors but failed to impress the technical staff to sign him.

Encouraged by a friend named Abdul Moneim Muhammad Ali, Orabi was introduced to Ahmed Maher, Al-Ahly U-21 Manager. Maher decided to attach Orabi to the team in 1982.

=== Al-Ahly ===
Orabi first appearance with Al-Ahly's first team was in 1982–83 season against Olympic Alexandria, when Mahmoud El-Gohary was Al-Ahly manager and Abdel-Aziz Abdel Shafi was the Football Director. Orabi was introduced as a substitute for Mokhtar Mokhtar in the last 20 minutes of the match that was played in Alexandria. Al-Ahly won 6–0 as Zakaria Nasef scored 3 goals, Fawzi Scotty 2 goals, and Mokhtar Mokhtar 1 goal.

Orabi's professional football career began in the 1983–84 season and ended in the 1998–99 season. During this 16 seasons span, Orabi won 28 different championship titles with Al-Ahly. He achieved an unprecedented record for any player by winning the football league 10 times during his career.

=== National team ===
Orabi participated in the 1990 FIFA World Cup in Italy and played one of Egypt's three matches in the competition. He played the full match against Ireland, which ended in a 0–0 draw. The match was moderated by Belgian referee Marcel van Langenhove and took place in June 1990 in the city of Palermo.

== Coaching career ==
After his retirement, Osama Orabi became the trainer of Al-Ahly's first team during the 2001–02 Egyptian Premier League season. Al-Ahly's technical staff at the time included the Portuguese manager Manuel Jose, the General coach Mokhtar Mokhtar, and the coach Hossam El-Badry in addition to Orabi. Al-Ahly won the National League Champions Cup and the African Super Cup under this technical staff management.

Osama Orabi raised to the first man position as he became the manager of Al-Sekka Al-Hadid and later Gasco in the Egyptian Second Division. On 6 June 2010, El-Entag El-Harby (a.k.a. Military Production) reached an agreement with Orabi to become the team manager with a one-season contract. Orabi will be leading El-Entag El-Harby in its second season in the Egyptian Premier League in its history.

== Honours ==
=== Club ===
Al-Ahly
- Egyptian Premier League: 10

1984–85, 1985–86, 1986–87, 1988–89, 1993–94, 1994–95, 1995–96, 1996–97, 1997–98, and 1998–99

- Egyptian cup: 8

1983, 1984, 1985, 1989, 1991, 1992, 1993, and 1996.

- CAF Champions League: 1

1987

- African Cup Winners' Cup: 4

1984, 1985, 1986, and 1993

- Arab Cup Winners' Cup: 1

1994–95

- Arab Club Champions Cup: 1

1996

- Arab Super Cup: 2

1997–98, 1998–99

- Afro-Asian Cup: 1

1989
