= Ayman Taher =

Egyptian footballer (born 1966)

Personal information
- Full name: Ayman Taher Kandil
- Date of birth: January 7, 1966 (age 60)
- Place of birth: Egypt

Senior career*
Years	Team	Apps	(Gls)
- Zamalek SC

International career
	Egypt	4	
- * Club domestic league appearances and goals

Ayman Taher Kandil (Arabic: ایمن طاهر; born January 7, 1966) is a former Egyptian goalkeeper, who played for Zamalek and Egypt. Taher was a part of the Egyptian squad that played in the 1990 FIFA World Cup.
