= Magdi Abdelghani =

Egyptian footballer (born 1959)

Magdy Abdelghany
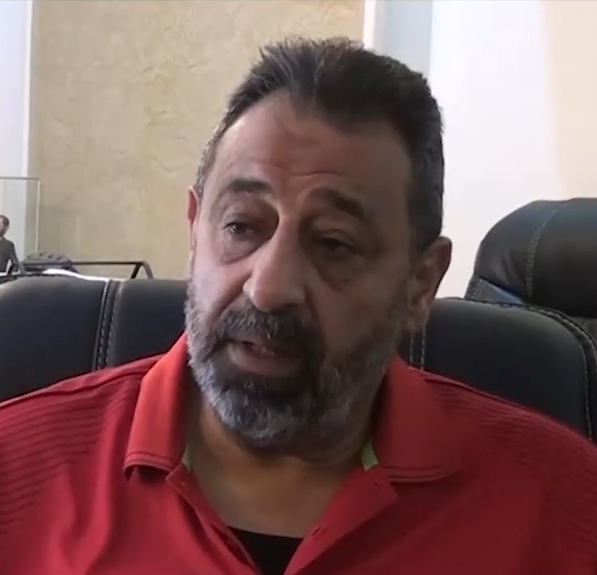
- Magdi Abdelghani in 2020

Personal information
- Full name: Magdy Abdelghany Sayed Ahmed
- Date of birth: 27 July 1959 (age 67)
- Place of birth: Cairo, Egypt
- Height: 1.73 m (5 ft 8 in)
- Position: Defensive midfielder

Youth career
- 1965–1977: Al Ahly

Senior career*
Years	Team	Apps	(Gls)
1977–1988	Al Ahly		
1988–1992	Beira-Mar		
1992–1993	Al Masry		
1993–1994	El Mokawloon		

International career
1981–1992	Egypt	50	(5)
- * Club domestic league appearances and goals

Magdi Abdelghani Sayed Ahmed (Arabic: مَجْدِيّ عَبْد الْغَنِيّ سَيِّد أَحْمَد; born 27 July 1959) is an Egyptian retired professional footballer who played as an attacking midfielder.

== Playing career ==
Abdelghani won 50 caps for Egypt, and at the 1990 FIFA World Cup in Italy he scored a penalty against Netherlands.

He also competed at the 1984 Summer Olympics, and helped the Pharaohs win the 1986 African Cup of Nations on home soil. He also won an All-African Games gold medal in 1987.

== Honours ==
=== Player ===
Al Ahly

- Egyptian Premier League: 1978–79, 1979–80, 1980–81, 1981–82, 1984–85, 1985–86, 1986–87
- Egyptian Cup: 1977–78, 1980–81, 1982–83, 1983–84, 1984–85
- African Cup of Champions Clubs: 1982, 1987
- African Cup Winners' Cup: 1984, 1985, 1986

Egypt

- Africa Cup of Nations: 1986
- All-Africa Games: Gold medal 1987
