= Ahmed Shobair =

Egyptian footballer (born 1960)

Personal information
- Full name: Ahmed Abdelaziz Shobeir
- Date of birth: 28 September 1960 (age 66)
- Place of birth: Tanta, Egypt
- Height: 1.86 m (6 ft 1 in)
- Position: Goalkeeper

Senior career*
Years	Team	Apps	(Gls)
1980–1997	Al Ahly	222	(0)

International career
1984–1996	Egypt	107	(0)

Managerial career
- 2004–2005: Al Ahly's Football Director
- * Club domestic league appearances and goals

Ahmed Abdelaziz Shobeir (Arabic: أحمد عبد العزيز شوبير; born 28 September 1960) is former Egyptian goalkeeper who played for Al Ahly club & Egypt national football team. He is a former vice-president of the Egyptian Football Association, and a previous official of Egyptian national Olympic team.

He became notorious for his appearance with his national team in the 1990 FIFA World Cup, especially in the goalless draw against the Irish team, in which his teammates constantly passed the ball back to him as a deliberate time-wasting tactic, resulting in a dour, emotionless match. This match is said to be the catalyst for the implementation of the back-pass rule following the tournament.

He was also a member in the Egyptian Parliament, representing his city Tanta, in Gharbia Governorate for the term, starting 2005 and ending in 2010. He was a member in the ruling National Democratic Party that eventually got dissolved following the 2011 Egyptian Revolution that toppled Egypt's President Hosni Mubarak.

He has been a renowned football T.V. commentator and show anchor since his retirement. He started at Dream channel and at "AlHayat TV" for his TV show "'El Kora Ma'a Shobeir" or "The Football with Shobeir". He then hosted a nightly football news and commentating show with the same name at ONTime Sport, as well as a radio show on ON Sport FM until July 2024.

His youngest son, Mostafa Shobeir, is Al Ahly’s current goalkeeper and also for the Egypt national team.

== Honours ==
Personal

- 7th Best African Footballer by France Football 1989
- 5th Best African Footballer by France Football 1990
- Best Egyptian goalkeeper several times
- Best Arab goalkeeper in 1987, 1989 & 1996
- President's Cup Most Valuable Player: 1993

International

- Participated in World Cup, Italy 1990
- African Cup of Nations 1986, Gold Medal
- Pan Arab Games gold medal & Arab Cup title in 1992
- All-African Games gold medal in 1987

Al-Ahly

- 8 Egyptian League titles
- 7 Egypt Cup titles
- 1 African Champions League titles
- 4 African Cup Winners' Cup titles
- 1 Afro-Asian Club Championship title in 1988
- 1 Arab Cup Winners' Cup title in 1994
- 1 Arab Club Champions Cup title in 1996
- Played for Al Ahly Sports club, from 1980 to 1997

== See also ==
- List of men's footballers with 100 or more international caps
