= Egypt national football team results (2000–2019) =

- Win Draw Loss

This is a list of the Egypt national football team results from 2000 to 2019.

== 2000s ==
=== 2000 ===
4 January Friendly	Egypt	2–1	Togo	Aswan, Egypt
16:00 CAT (UTC+2)	El Sakka 87'; Agoro (??)	Report	Ayi 57'	Stadium: Aswan Stadium; Attendance: 9,000

6 January Friendly	Egypt	4–0	Gabon	Aswan, Egypt
17:00 CAT (UTC+2)	A. Hosny 44'; H. Hassan 52'; Abdel Halim 62'; El Sakka 72'	Report		Stadium: Aswan Stadium; Attendance: 20,000

9 January Friendly	Ivory Coast	2–0	Egypt	Abidjan, Ivory Coast
15:00 GMT (UTC±0)	Dago 3'; Kalou 83'	Report		Stadium: Stade Félix Houphouët-Boigny; Attendance: 25,000

19 January Friendly	Togo	1–0	Egypt	Lomé, Togo
16:00 GMT (UTC±0)	Salou 90+1'	Report		Stadium: Stade de Kégué; Attendance: 6,000

23 January 2000 African Cup of Nations Group C	Egypt	2–0	Zambia	Kano, Nigeria
18:30 WAT (UTC+1)	Radwan 37'; H. Hassan 50'	Report		Stadium: Sani Abacha Stadium; Attendance: 18,000; Referee: Coffi Codjia (Benin)

28 January 2000 African Cup of Nations Group C	Egypt	1–0	Senegal	Kano, Nigeria
18:30 WAT (UTC+1)	H. Hassan 39'	Report		Stadium: Sani Abacha Stadium; Attendance: 30,000; Referee: Petros Mathabela (South Africa)

2 February 2000 African Cup of Nations Group C	Egypt	4–2	Burkina Faso	Kano, Nigeria
17:00 WAT (UTC+1)	A. Hosny 30'; H. Hassan 75' (pen.); Ramzy 85'; Abdel Halim 90'	Report	Koudou 10'; Sanou 24'	Stadium: Sani Abacha Stadium; Attendance: 17,000; Referee: Pierre Mounguegui (Gabon)

7 February 2000 African Cup of Nations Quarter-finals	Egypt	0–1	Tunisia	Kano, Nigeria
16:00 WAT (UTC+1)		Report	Badra 22' (pen.)	Stadium: Sani Abacha Stadium; Attendance: 12,000; Referee: Alain Sars (France)

20 April 2002 FIFA World Cup qualification	Mauritius	0–2	Egypt	Cairo, Egypt
18:00 CAST (UTC+3)		Report	Emara 15'; Farouk 75'	Stadium: Cairo International Stadium; Attendance: 55,000; Referee: Hichem Guirat (Tunisia)

23 April 2002 FIFA World Cup qualification	Egypt	4–2 (6–2 agg.)	Mauritius	Alexandria, Egypt
19:00 CAST (UTC+3)	Kamouna 5' (pen.); Farouk 72', 74'; Abdel Latif 90'	Report	Périatambée 45'; Bax 88'	Stadium: Alexandria Stadium; Attendance: 15,000; Referee: Mohsen Boukthir (Tunisia)

7 June 2000 LG Cup Semi-finals	Iran	1–1 (7–8 p)	Egypt	Tehran, Iran
19:00 IRDT (UTC+4:30)	Daei 58'	Report	H. Hassan 52'	Stadium: Azadi Stadium
	Penalties
	Daei (penalty scored); Karimi (penalty scored); Hamedani (penalty scored); Kavianpour (penalty scored); Bakhtiarizadeh (penalty scored); Yazdani (penalty missed); Rahbarifar (penalty scored); Minavand (penalty missed); Nekounam (penalty scored); Hashemian (penalty missed)		(penalty scored) Kamouna; (penalty scored) Homos; (penalty scored) T. El Said; (penalty scored) Sabry; (penalty scored) A. Hassan I (penalty missed) Khashaba; (penalty scored) Emam; (penalty missed) I. Hassan; (penalty scored) El Sakka; (penalty scored) Farouk

9 June 2000 LG Cup Final	Egypt	0–1	South Korea	Tehran, Iran
20:00 IRDT (UTC+4:30)		Report	Park Kang-jo 63'	Stadium: Azadi Stadium

17 June Friendly	Egypt	2–0	Ghana	Cairo, Egypt
19:00 CAST (UTC+3)	Abdel Latif 8'; A. Hosny 90+2'	Report		Stadium: Cairo International Stadium; Attendance: 10,000

9 July 2002 FIFA World Cup qualification	Senegal	0–0	Egypt	Dakar, Senegal
16:30 GMT (UTC±0)		Report		Stadium: Stade Léopold Sédar Senghor; Attendance: 45,000; Referee: Lim Kee Chong (Mauritius)

25 August Friendly	Egypt	2–1	Kenya	Port Said, Egypt
19:00 CAST (UTC+3)	Abdel Baqi 55'; H. Hassan 90'	Report	Mambo 72'	Stadium: Port Said Stadium; Attendance: 15,000

2 September 2002 African Cup of Nations qualification	Egypt	1–0	Ivory Coast	Alexandria, Egypt
20:00 CAST (UTC+3)	Abdel Hafeez 15'	Report		Stadium: Alexandria Stadium; Attendance: 10,000

2 October Friendly	Qatar	0–1	Egypt	Doha, Qatar
20:00 AST (UTC+3)		Report	T. El Said 25'	Stadium: Jassim bin Hamad Stadium

8 October 2002 African Cup of Nations qualification	Sudan	0–1	Egypt	Omdurman, Sudan
19:00 CAST (UTC+3)		Report	H. Hassan 22'	Stadium: Al Merrikh Stadium

=== 2001 ===
6 January Friendly	Egypt	2–1	United Arab Emirates	Cairo, Egypt
19:00 CAT (UTC+2)	Mido 50'; I. Hassan 77'	Report	Jumaa 31' (pen.)	Stadium: Cairo International Stadium; Referee: Gamal El Ghandour (Egypt)

9 January Friendly	Egypt	3–1	Zambia	Cairo, Egypt
18:00 CAT (UTC+2)	Sabry 46', 64'; Farouk 62'	Report	Sichone 76'	Stadium: Cairo International Stadium; Attendance: 10,000

14 January 2002 African Cup of Nations qualification	Egypt	4–0	Libya	Cairo, Egypt
19:30 CAT (UTC+2)	I. Hassan 27'; A. Hassan I 47', 62'; Sabry 66' (pen.)	Report		Stadium: Cairo International Stadium; Attendance: 25,000; Referee: Abderrahim El Arjoun (Morocco)

17 January Friendly	Egypt	0–0 (3–2 p)	China	Tehran, Iran
19:30 IRST (UTC+3:30)		Report		Stadium: Azadi Stadium; Attendance: 30,000
	Penalties
	I. El Said (penalty missed); A. Hassan I (penalty scored); M. Youssef (penalty scored); Barakat (penalty scored)		(penalty scored) ?? (penalty missed) ?? (penalty scored) ?? (penalty missed) ?? (penalty missed) ??

23 January Friendly	Egypt	1–0	North Korea	Ismailia, Egypt
19:00 CAT (UTC+2)	T. El Said 7' (pen.)	Report		Stadium: Ismailia Stadium; Referee: Gamal El Ghandour (Egypt)

28 January 2002 FIFA World Cup qualification	Egypt	0–0	Morocco	Cairo, Egypt
18:00 CAT (UTC+2)		Report		Stadium: Cairo International Stadium; Attendance: 60,000; Referee: Abdul Hakim Shelmani (Libya)

24 February 2002 FIFA World Cup qualification	Namibia	1–1	Egypt	Windhoek, Namibia
16:00 SAST (UTC+2)	Tjikuzu 51'	Report	I. El Said 89'	Stadium: Sam Nujoma Stadium; Attendance: 15,000; Referee: Petros Mathabela (South Africa)

11 March 2002 FIFA World Cup qualification	Egypt	5–2	Algeria	Cairo, Egypt
19:00 CAT (UTC+2)	Barakat 7'; Sabry 17'; El Sakka 38'; T. El Said 87', 89'	Report	Tasfaout 11'; Kraouche 37'	Stadium: Cairo International Stadium; Attendance: 45,000; Referee: Lim Kee Chong (Mauritius)

19 March Friendly	Egypt	3–3	Estonia	Cairo, Egypt
19:00 CAT (UTC+2)	Abdel Latif 32'; Abdel Rahman 62'; A. Hosny 90+3'	Report	Oper 36'; Kristal 55'; Viikmäe 86'	Stadium: Cairo International Stadium; Attendance: 3,500; Referee: Gamal El Ghandour (Egypt)

23 March 2002 African Cup of Nations qualification	Libya	2–0	Egypt	Benghazi, Libya
18:00 CAT (UTC+2)	Abou Kouba 53'; Al Masli 64'	Report		Stadium: Stade du 28 Mars; Attendance: 25,000; Referee: Kamel Berber (Algeria)

24 April 2001 LG Cup Semi-final	Egypt	3–0	Canada	Cairo, Egypt
19:00 CAT (UTC+2)	Sabry 3'; A. Hosny 20'; Barakat 43'	Report		Stadium: Cairo International Stadium; Attendance: 25,000

26 April 2001 LG Cup Final	Egypt	1–2	South Korea	Cairo, Egypt
20:00 CAT (UTC+2)	Abdel Rahman 22'	Report	Ha Seok-ju 12'; Ahn Hyo-yeon 60'	Stadium: Cairo International Stadium; Attendance: 25,000

6 May 2002 FIFA World Cup qualification	Egypt	1–0	Senegal	Cairo, Egypt
20:15 CAST (UTC+3)	Mido 48'	Report		Stadium: Cairo International Stadium; Attendance: 70,000; Referee: Lucien Bouchardeau (Niger)

3 June 2002 African Cup of Nations qualification	Egypt	3–2	Sudan	Alexandria, Egypt
20:00 CAST (UTC+3)	Mido 20', 51'; A. Hosny 58'	Report	Moga 69'; Gabra 89' (pen.)	Stadium: Alexandria Stadium; Attendance: 13,000; Referee: Mohsen Boukthir (Tunisia)

10 June Friendly	Kenya	1–1	Egypt	Nairobi, Kenya
17:00 EAT (UTC+3)	Sirengo 30'	Report	Mido 58'	Stadium: Moi International Sports Centre
Note: Egypt's goal is also accredited to Ahmed Hosny.

17 June 2002 African Cup of Nations qualification	Ivory Coast	2–2	Egypt	Abidjan, Ivory Coast
18:00 GMT (UTC±0)	Bakayoko 70' (pen.); N. El Sayed 83' (o.g.)	Report	A. Hosny 56'; I. El Said 84'	Stadium: Stade Félix Houphouët-Boigny; Attendance: 6,000; Referee: Hailemalik Tessema (Ethiopia)

30 June 2002 FIFA World Cup qualification	Morocco	1–0	Egypt	Rabat, Morocco
21:00 WEST (UTC+1)	Hadji 32'	Report		Stadium: Prince Moulay Abdellah Stadium; Attendance: 45,000; Referee: Edwin Senai (Botswana)

13 July 2002 FIFA World Cup qualification	Egypt	8–2	Namibia	Alexandria, Egypt
20:30 CAST (UTC+3)	T. El Said 5'; Barakat 36', 73'; Bassiouny 40', 42', 44'; M. S. Abou Greisha 77'; Sabry 88'	Report	Mkontwana 53'; Gariseb 70'	Stadium: Alexandria Stadium; Attendance: 21,000; Referee: Mohamed Abdalla (Libya)

21 July 2002 FIFA World Cup qualification	Algeria	1–1	Egypt	Annaba, Algeria
16:00 WAT (UTC+1)	Ghazi 88'	Report	Mido 60' (pen.)	Stadium: Stade du 19 Mai 1956; Attendance: 38,000; Referee: Coffi Codjia (Benin)

10 November 2001 Nelson Mandela Challenge	South Africa	1–0	Egypt	Johannesburg, South Africa
19:00 SAST (UTC+1)	Bartlett 53'	Report		Stadium: FNB Stadium; Attendance: 10,000; Referee: Samuel Moeketsi (Lesotho)

30 December Friendly	Qatar	2–2	Egypt	Doha, Qatar
20:00 AST (UTC+3)	Nazmi 33'; Rashed 61'	Report	Mido 76'; Bebo 79'	Stadium: Jassim bin Hamad Stadium

=== 2002 ===
4 January Friendly	Egypt	2–0	Ghana	Ismailia, Egypt
18:00 CAT (UTC+2)	Bebo 42'; A. Hosny 45'	Report		Stadium: Ismailia Stadium; Attendance: 8,000

6 January Friendly	Egypt	1–2	Mali	Ismailia, Egypt
18:30 CAT (UTC+2)	Mido 90+2'	Report	N. Diarra 48', 75'	Stadium: Ismailia Stadium

11 January Friendly	Egypt	2–2	Burkina Faso	Cairo, Egypt
19:00 CAT (UTC+2)	Mido 35'; A. Hosny 68'	Report	Barro 69'; Ouédraogo 81'	Stadium: Cairo International Stadium

20 January 2002 African Cup of Nations Group D	Egypt	0–1	Senegal	Bamako, Mali
15:30 GMT (UTC±0)		Report	Diatta 82'	Stadium: Stade Modibo Kéïta; Attendance: 20,000; Referee: Mohamed Guezzaz (Morocco)

25 January 2002 African Cup of Nations Group D	Egypt	1–0	Tunisia	Bamako, Mali
15:30 GMT (UTC±0)	Emam 23'	Report		Stadium: Stade Modibo Kéïta; Attendance: 3,000; Referee: Arturo Daudén Ibáñez (Spain)

31 January 2002 African Cup of Nations Group D	Egypt	2–1	Zambia	Bamako, Mali
16:00 GMT (UTC±0)	Mido 35'; Emam 53'	Report	Kampamba 83'	Stadium: Stade Modibo Kéïta; Attendance: 10,000; Referee: Coffi Codjia (Benin)

4 February 2002 African Cup of Nations Quarter-finals	Cameroon	1–0	Egypt	Sikasso, Mali
16:00 GMT (UTC±0)	M'Boma 62'	Report		Stadium: Stade Babemba Traoré; Attendance: 15,000; Referee: Mourad Daami (Tunisia)

8 August Friendly	Egypt	4–1	Ethiopia	Alexandria, Egypt
20:00 CAST (UTC+3)	Barakat 4'; Belal 7'; Abdel Halim 79'; Y. Hamdy 89'	Report	Ateya 82' (o.g.)	Stadium: Alexandria Stadium

20 August Friendly	Egypt	2–0	Uganda	Alexandria, Egypt
20:00 CAST (UTC+3)	Belal 2', 21'	Report		Stadium: Alexandria Stadium

23 August Friendly	Egypt	3–0	Sudan	Alexandria, Egypt
20:30 CAST (UTC+3)	S. Youssef 32'; Barakat 43' (pen.), 75'	Report		Stadium: Alexandria Stadium

27 August Friendly	Egypt	0–1	Libya	Alexandria, Egypt
19:00 CAST (UTC+3)		Report	Al Masli 72'	Stadium: Alexandria Stadium

7 September 2004 African Cup of Nations qualification	Madagascar	1–0	Egypt	Antananarivo, Madagascar
17:00 EAT (UTC+3)	Ruphin 63'	Report		Stadium: Mahamasina Municipal Stadium; Referee: Aaron Dkole (Zambia)

20 November Friendly	Tunisia	0–0	Egypt	Tunis, Tunisia
21:00 WAT (UTC+1)		Report		Stadium: Stade Olympique d'El Menzah; Referee: Jamel Ambaya (Libya)

25 November Friendly	Nigeria	1–1	Egypt	Lagos, Nigeria
16:00 WAT (UTC+1)	Moneke 73'	Report	El Yamani 26'	Stadium: National Stadium

16 December Friendly	United Arab Emirates	1–2	Egypt	Abu Dhabi, United Arab Emirates
19:00 GST (UTC+4)	A. Ali 50'	Report	Abdel Hafeez 6'; Belal 90+3'	Stadium: Mohammed bin Zayed Stadium

22 December Friendly	Egypt	0–0	Ghana	Ismailia, Egypt
19:30 CAT (UTC+2)				Stadium: Ismailia Stadium

=== 2003 ===
12 February Friendly	Egypt	1–4	Denmark	Cairo, Egypt
19:00 CAT (UTC+2)	A. Hassan I 20'	Report	C. Jensen 31', 68', 70'; Tomasson 59'	Stadium: Cairo International Stadium; Attendance: 40,000; Referee: Essam Abdel Fatah (Egypt)

19 March Friendly	Egypt	6–0	Qatar	Port Said, Egypt
19:30 CAT (UTC+2)	Hamza 14', 35', 37'; T. El Sayed 42'; Souayah 49' (o.g.); Abdel Halim 79' (pen.)	Report		Stadium: Port Said Stadium; Referee: Reda El Beltagy (Egypt)

29 March 2004 African Cup of Nations qualification	Mauritius	0–1	Egypt	Beau Bassin-Rose Hill, Mauritius
16:00 MUT (UTC+4)		Report	Mido 43'	Stadium: Sir Gaëtan Duval Stadium; Attendance: 800; Referee: Jelas Masole (Botswana)

30 April Friendly	France	5–0	Egypt	Saint-Denis, France
20:45 CEST (UTC+2)	Henry 26', 34'; Pires 45'; Cissé 62'; Kapo 79'	Report		Stadium: Stade de France; Attendance: 54,554; Referee: Massimo Busacca (Switzerland)

8 June 2004 African Cup of Nations qualification	Egypt	7–0	Mauritius	Port Said, Egypt
20:00 CAST (UTC+3)	Mido 9' (pen.), 20'; T. El Sayed 18'; Hamza 52'; Emam 60'; A. Hassan I 70', 90+1'	Report		Stadium: Port Said Stadium; Attendance: 40,000; Referee: Mohamed Abdalla (Libya)

20 June 2004 African Cup of Nations qualification	Egypt	6–0	Madagascar	Port Said, Egypt
20:00 CAST (UTC+3)	El Tabei 1'; Belal 9', 24', 56', 83'; Mido 41'	Report		Stadium: Port Said Stadium

10 October Friendly	Egypt	1–0	Senegal	Cairo, Egypt
20:30 CAST (UTC+3)	Mido 51'	Report		Stadium: Cairo International Stadium; Attendance: 20,000

15 November Friendly	Egypt	2–1	South Africa	Cairo, Egypt
20:00 CAT (UTC+2)	Abdel Hady 72'; Mido 90+2'	Report	McCarthy 50'	Stadium: Cairo International Stadium; Attendance: 10,000; Referee: Abdullah Salim (Libya)

18 November Friendly	Egypt	1–0	Sweden	Cairo, Egypt
21:45 CAT (UTC+2)	Belal 10'	Report		Stadium: Cairo International Stadium; Attendance: 20,000; Referee: Mohamed Abdalla (Libya)

12 December 2003 Bahrain Prime Minister's Cup	Kenya	0–1	Egypt	Riffa, Bahrain
17:00 AST (UTC+3)		Report	T. El Sayed 9'	Stadium: National Stadium

15 December 2003 Bahrain Prime Minister's Cup	Bahrain	0–1	Egypt	Riffa, Bahrain
19:00 AST (UTC+3)		Report	S. Youssef 89'	Stadium: National Stadium

18 December 2003 Bahrain Prime Minister's Cup	Egypt	2–0	Iraq	Riffa, Bahrain
17:00 AST (UTC+3)	Belal 21', 50'	Report		Stadium: National Stadium

=== 2004 ===
8 January Friendly	Egypt	5–1	Rwanda	Port Said, Egypt
19:00 CAT (UTC+2)	Belal 16'; Abdel Hamid 26'; El Tabei 39'; A. Hassan I 59', 68'	Report	Makasi 87'	Stadium: Port Said Stadium; Attendance: 10,000

14 January Friendly	Egypt	2–2	DR Congo	Port Said, Egypt
19:00 CAT (UTC+2)	Belal 40', 53'	Report	Dinzey 52'; Mbuta 70'	Stadium: Port Said Stadium; Attendance: 10,000; Referee: Mohamed Kamal (Egypt)

17 January Friendly	Egypt	1–1	Burkina Faso	Port Said, Egypt
18:30 CAT (UTC+2)	Belal 53'	Report	Dagano 39'	Stadium: Port Said Stadium; Attendance: 8,000

25 January 2004 African Cup of Nations Group C	Zimbabwe	1–2	Egypt	Sfax, Tunisia
16:30 WAT (UTC+1)	Ndlovu 46'	Report	Abdel Hamid 58'; Barakat 63'	Stadium: Stade Taïeb Mhiri; Attendance: 22,000; Referee: Lassina Paré (Burkina Faso)

29 January 2004 African Cup of Nations Group C	Algeria	2–1	Egypt	Sousse, Tunisia
19:00 WAT (UTC+1)	Mamouni 13'; Achiou 86'	Report	Belal 25'	Stadium: Stade Olympique de Sousse; Attendance: 15,000; Referee: Alain Hamer (Luxembourg)

3 February 2004 African Cup of Nations Group C	Cameroon	0–0	Egypt	Monastir, Tunisia
14:00 WAT (UTC+1)		Report		Stadium: Stade Mustapha Ben Jannet; Attendance: 20,000; Referee: Ali Bujsaim (United Arab Emirates)

31 March Friendly	Egypt	2–1	Trinidad and Tobago	Cairo, Egypt
20:45 CAST (UTC+3)	Abou Trika 59'; Abdel Halim 67'	Report	S. John 79'	Stadium: Osman Ahmed Osman Stadium; Attendance: 13,000; Referee: Reda El Beltagy (Egypt)

24 May Friendly	Egypt	2–0	Zimbabwe	Cairo, Egypt
20:30 CAST (UTC+3)	Abou Trika 65'; O. Hosny 75' (pen.)	Report		Stadium: Cairo International Stadium; Attendance: 10,000

29 May Friendly	Egypt	2–0	Gabon	Cairo, Egypt
20:00 CAST (UTC+3)	H. Hassan 88', 90+4'	Report		Stadium: Cairo International Stadium; Attendance: 15,000; Referee: Ahmed Ouda (Egypt)

6 June 2006 FIFA World Cup qualification	Sudan	0–3	Egypt	Khartoum, Sudan
20:00 CAST (UTC+3)		Report	Abdel Halim 6'; Abou Trika 53'; Abdel Wahab 88'	Stadium: Khartoum Stadium; Attendance: 10,000; Referee: Kubrom Kidane (Eritrea)
Note: This was a combined 2006 FIFA World Cup and 2006 Africa Cup of Nations qualification match. However, Egypt automatically qualified for the 2006 Africa Cup of Nations for being the hosts of the tournament.

20 June 2006 FIFA World Cup qualification	Egypt	1–2	Ivory Coast	Alexandria, Egypt
20:00 CAST (UTC+3)	Abou Trika 55'	Report	Dindane 22'; Drogba 75'	Stadium: Alexandria Stadium; Attendance: 13,000; Referee: Hichem Guirat (Tunisia)
Note: This was a combined 2006 FIFA World Cup and 2006 Africa Cup of Nations qualification match. However, Egypt automatically qualified for the 2006 Africa Cup of Nations for being the hosts of the tournament.

4 July 2006 FIFA World Cup qualification	Benin	3–3	Egypt	Cotonou, Benin
16:00 WAT (UTC+1)	O. Tchomogo 8' (pen.); Ahouéya 46'; Ogunbiyi 68'	Report	A. Hassan I 66'; O. Hosny 75'; Mostafa 80'	Stadium: Stade de l'Amitié; Attendance: 20,000; Referee: Chukwudi Chukwujekwu (Nigeria)
Note: This was a combined 2006 FIFA World Cup and 2006 Africa Cup of Nations qualification match. However, Egypt automatically qualified for the 2006 Africa Cup of Nations for being the hosts of the tournament.

5 September 2006 FIFA World Cup qualification	Egypt	3–2	Cameroon	Cairo, Egypt
20:00 CAST (UTC+3)	Shawky 45'; A. Hassan I 74' (pen.); T. El Sayed 86'	Report	Tchato 89'; Eto'o 90+2'	Stadium: Osman Ahmed Osman Stadium; Attendance: 25,000; Referee: Lim Kee Chong (Mauritius)
Note: This was a combined 2006 FIFA World Cup and 2006 Africa Cup of Nations qualification match. However, Egypt automatically qualified for the 2006 Africa Cup of Nations for being the hosts of the tournament.

8 October 2006 FIFA World Cup qualification	Libya	2–1	Egypt	Tripoli, Libya
19:00 CAT (UTC+2)	Karra 31'; A. Osman 85'	Report	Zaki 57'	Stadium: Stade 11 Juin; Attendance: 40,000; Referee: Djamel Haimoudi (Algeria)
Note: This was a combined 2006 FIFA World Cup and 2006 Africa Cup of Nations qualification match. However, Egypt automatically qualified for the 2006 Africa Cup of Nations for being the hosts of the tournament.

29 November Friendly	Egypt	1–1	Bulgaria	Cairo, Egypt
20:45 CAT (UTC+2)	Moteab 86'	Report	Gargorov 90+3'	Stadium: Osman Ahmed Osman Stadium

=== 2005 ===
8 January Friendly	Egypt	3–0	Uganda	Cairo, Egypt
18:30 CAT (UTC+2)	Zaki 38' (pen.), 67'; Shawky 63'	Report		Stadium: Cairo Military Academy Stadium

4 February Friendly	South Korea	0–1	Egypt	Seoul, South Korea
19:00 KST (UTC+9)		Report	Moteab 14'	Stadium: Seoul World Cup Stadium; Attendance: 16,054

9 February Friendly	Egypt	4–0	Belgium	Cairo, Egypt
20:45 CAT (UTC+2)	Moteab 39', 50'; Abdel Malek 52'; O. Hosny 80'	Report		Stadium: Cairo Military Academy Stadium; Attendance: 2,000; Referee: Reda El Beltagy (Egypt)

14 March Friendly	Saudi Arabia	0–1	Egypt	Dammam, Saudi Arabia
17:15 AST (UTC+3)		Report	Moteab 64'	Stadium: Prince Mohammed bin Fahd Stadium

27 March 2006 FIFA World Cup qualification	Egypt	4–1	Libya	Cairo, Egypt
20:00 CAST (UTC+3)	Mido 55'; Moteab 56', 81'; A. Hassan I 77'	Report	Ferjani 50'	Stadium: Osman Ahmed Osman Stadium; Attendance: 30,000; Referee: Éric Poulat (France)
Note: This was a combined 2006 FIFA World Cup and 2006 Africa Cup of Nations qualification match. However, Egypt automatically qualified for the 2006 Africa Cup of Nations for being the hosts of the tournament.

27 May Friendly	Kuwait	0–1	Egypt	Kuwait City, Kuwait
21:00 AST (UTC+3)		Report	A. Hassan I 52'	Stadium: Al Sadaqua Wal Salam Stadium

5 June 2006 FIFA World Cup qualification	Egypt	6–1	Sudan	Cairo, Egypt
21:00 CAST (UTC+3)	Abdel Halim 8', 31'; Zaki 28', 50'; T. El Sayed 62'; Abdel Malek 71'	Report	Tambal 83'	Stadium: Osman Ahmed Osman Stadium; Attendance: 20,000; Referee: Joseph Mususa (Zimbabwe)
Note: This was a combined 2006 FIFA World Cup and 2006 Africa Cup of Nations qualification match. However, Egypt automatically qualified for the 2006 Africa Cup of Nations for being the hosts of the tournament.

19 June 2006 FIFA World Cup qualification	Ivory Coast	2–0	Egypt	Abidjan, Ivory Coast
16:00 GMT (UTC±0)	Drogba 41', 49'	Report		Stadium: Stade Félix Houphouët-Boigny; Attendance: 30,000; Referee: Jerome Damon (South Africa)
Note: This was a combined 2006 FIFA World Cup and 2006 Africa Cup of Nations qualification match. However, Egypt automatically qualified for the 2006 Africa Cup of Nations for being the hosts of the tournament.

29 July Friendly	Egypt	5–0	Qatar	Geneva, Switzerland
18:00 CEST (UTC+2)	Abou Trika 60', 84'; O. Hosny 66'; Zaki 72', 89'	Report		Stadium: Stade de Genève

31 July Friendly	Egypt	0–0 (5–4 p)	United Arab Emirates	Geneva, Switzerland
20:00 CEST (UTC+2)		Report		Stadium: Stade de Genève
	Penalties
	Abd Rabo (penalty scored); Abdel Halim (penalty scored); Moteab (penalty scored); Zaki (penalty scored); W. Gomaa (penalty scored)		(penalty scored) ?? (penalty scored) ?? (penalty scored) ?? (penalty scored) ?? (penalty missed) ??

17 August Friendly	Portugal	2–0	Egypt	Ponta Delgada, Portugal
20:15 AZOST (UTC±0)	Meira 50'; Postiga 70'	Report		Stadium: Estádio de São Miguel; Attendance: 12,000; Referee: Jacek Granat (Poland)

4 September 2006 FIFA World Cup qualification	Egypt	4–1	Benin	Cairo, Egypt
20:30 CAST (UTC+3)	Zaki 12', 15', 84'; Mido 71'	Report	Sessègnon 60'	Stadium: Osman Ahmed Osman Stadium; Attendance: 5,000; Referee: Buenkadila Bisingu (DR Congo)
Note: This was a combined 2006 FIFA World Cup and 2006 Africa Cup of Nations qualification match. However, Egypt automatically qualified for the 2006 Africa Cup of Nations for being the hosts of the tournament.

8 October 2006 FIFA World Cup qualification	Cameroon	1–1	Egypt	Yaoundé, Cameroon
16:00 WAT (UTC+1)	Douala 20'	Report	Shawky 79'	Stadium: Stade Ahmadou Ahidjo; Attendance: 38,750; Referee: Koman Coulibaly (Mali)
Note: This was a combined 2006 FIFA World Cup and 2006 Africa Cup of Nations qualification match. However, Egypt automatically qualified for the 2006 Africa Cup of Nations for being the hosts of the tournament.

16 November Friendly	Egypt	1–2	Tunisia	Cairo, Egypt
19:30 CAT (UTC+2)	Mido 50'	Report	Guemamdia 57', 59'	Stadium: Osman Ahmed Osman Stadium

27 December 2005 LG Cup Semi-Finals	Egypt	2–0	Uganda	Cairo, Egypt
20:00 CAT (UTC+2)	Zaki 44', 66'	Report		Stadium: Cairo International Stadium

=== 2006 ===
5 January Friendly	Egypt	2–0	Zimbabwe	Alexandria, Egypt
19:30 CAT (UTC+2)	Abdel Halim 33', 78'	Report		Stadium: Alexandria Stadium

14 January Friendly	Egypt	1–2	South Africa	Cairo, Egypt
20:00 CAT (UTC+2)	Zaki 24'	Report	Zaki 13' (o.g.); McCarthy 46'	Stadium: Cairo International Stadium

20 January 2006 Africa Cup of Nations Group A	Egypt	3–0	Libya	Cairo, Egypt
19:00 CAT (UTC+2)	Mido 18'; Abou Trika 22'; A. Hassan I 78'	Report		Stadium: Cairo International Stadium; Attendance: 65,000; Referee: Lassina Paré (Burkina Faso)

24 January 2006 Africa Cup of Nations Group A	Egypt	0–0	Morocco	Cairo, Egypt
20:00 CAT (UTC+2)		Report		Stadium: Cairo International Stadium; Attendance: 47,000; Referee: Coffi Codjia (Benin)

28 January 2006 Africa Cup of Nations Group A	Egypt	3–1	Ivory Coast	Cairo, Egypt
19:00 CAT (UTC+2)	Moteab 8', 70'; Abou Trika 61'	Report	A. Koné 43'	Stadium: Cairo International Stadium; Attendance: 74,000; Referee: Eddy Maillet (Seychelles)

3 February 2006 Africa Cup of Nations Quarter-finals	Egypt	4–1	DR Congo	Cairo, Egypt
19:00 CAT (UTC+2)	A. Hassan I 33' (pen.), 89'; H. Hassan 39'; Moteab 57'	Report	El Sakka 45+2' (o.g.)	Stadium: Cairo International Stadium; Attendance: 74,000; Referee: Modou Sowe (Gambia)

7 February 2006 Africa Cup of Nations Semi-finals	Egypt	2–1	Senegal	Cairo, Egypt
19:00 CAT (UTC+2)	A. Hassan I 37' (pen.); Zaki 81'	Report	Niang 52'	Stadium: Cairo International Stadium; Attendance: 74,100; Referee: Raphaël Evehe Divine (Cameroon)

10 February 2006 Africa Cup of Nations Final	Egypt	0–0 (4–2 p)	Ivory Coast	Cairo, Egypt
18:00 CAT (UTC+2)		Report		Stadium: Cairo International Stadium; Attendance: 80,000; Referee: Mourad Daami (Tunisia)
	Penalties
	A. Hassan I (penalty scored); Abdel Wahab (penalty scored); Abdel Halim (penalty missed); Zaki (penalty scored); Abou Trika (penalty scored)		(penalty missed) Drogba; (penalty scored) K. Touré; (penalty missed) B. Koné; (penalty scored) Eboué

3 June Friendly	Spain	2–0	Egypt	Elche, Spain
21:00 CEST (UTC+2)	Raúl 14'; Reyes 57'	Report		Stadium: Estadio Manuel Martínez Valero; Attendance: 38,000; Referee: Stefano Farina (Italy)

16 August Friendly	Egypt	0–2	Uruguay	Alexandria, Egypt
20:30 CAST (UTC+3)		Report	Godín 67'; El Sakka 77' (o.g.)	Stadium: Alexandria Stadium; Attendance: 10,000

2 September 2008 Africa Cup of Nations qualification	Egypt	4–1	Burundi	Cairo, Egypt
21:00 CAST (UTC+3)	Zidan 5'; Abd Rabo 29'; Abou Trika 39'; A. Hassan I 52' (pen.)	Report	Se. Ndikumana 79' (pen.)	Stadium: Cairo International Stadium

7 October 2008 Africa Cup of Nations qualification	Botswana	0–0	Egypt	Gaborone, Botswana
17:00 CAT (UTC+2)		Report		Stadium: National Stadium

15 November 2006 Nelson Mandela Challenge	Egypt	1–0	South Africa	London, England
20:45 GMT (UTC±0)	Moteab 4'	Report		Stadium: Griffin Park

=== 2007 ===
7 February Friendly	Egypt	2–0	Sweden	Cairo, Egypt
20:00 CAT (UTC+2)	Zaki 43'; Fathy 88'	Report		Stadium: Cairo International Stadium; Attendance: 25,000; Referee: Mohamed Abdalla (Libya)

25 March 2008 Africa Cup of Nations qualification	Egypt	3–0	Mauritania	Cairo, Egypt
19:30 CAT (UTC+2)	Zidan 20'; Sidibé 23' (o.g.); Ghaly 67'	Report		Stadium: Cairo International Stadium

3 June 2008 Africa Cup of Nations qualification	Mauritania	1–1	Egypt	Nouakchott, Mauritania
16:00 GMT (UTC±0)	Langlet 70'	Report	A. Hassan I 10'	Stadium: Stade Olympique

12 June Friendly	Kuwait	1–1	Egypt	Kuwait City, Kuwait
20:30 AST (UTC+3)	B. Abdullah 10' (pen.)	Report	Shikabala 58'	Stadium: Al Sadaqua Wal Salam Stadium

22 August Friendly	Ivory Coast	0–0	Egypt	Paris, France
20:00 CEST (UTC+2)		Report		Stadium: Stade Sébastien Charléty

9 September 2008 Africa Cup of Nations qualification	Burundi	0–0	Egypt	Bujumbura, Burundi
15:00 CAT (UTC+2)		Report		Stadium: Stade Prince Louis Rwagasore

13 October 2008 Africa Cup of Nations qualification	Egypt	1–0	Botswana	Cairo, Egypt
19:30 CAT (UTC+2)	Fadl 78'	Report		Stadium: Cairo International Stadium

17 October 2007 Afro-Asian Cup of Nations	Japan	4–1	Egypt	Osaka, Japan
19:30 JST (UTC+9)	Ōkubo 21', 42'; Maeda 53'; Kaji 68'	Report	Fadl 58'	Stadium: Osaka Nagai Stadium; Attendance: 41,901; Referee: Grzegorz Gilewski (Poland)

21 November 2007 Pan Arab Games	Egypt	0–0	Libya	Port Said, Egypt
19:15 CAT (UTC+2)		Report		Stadium: Port Said Stadium

25 November 2007 Pan Arab Games	Egypt	2–1	Saudi Arabia	Cairo, Egypt
19:00 CAT (UTC+2)	Ghaly 39'; Moteab 45'	Report	Al Qahtani 55' (pen.)	Stadium: Cairo International Stadium

=== 2008 ===
5 January Friendly	Egypt	3–0	Namibia	Aswan, Egypt
20:00 CAT (UTC+2)	Zaki 53', 90'; A. Hassan I 77'	Report		Stadium: Aswan Stadium

10 January Friendly	Egypt	1–0	Mali	Abu Dhabi, United Arab Emirates
20:30 GST (UTC+4)	Abd Rabo 42' (pen.)	Report		Stadium: Al Nahyan Stadium

13 January Friendly	Angola	3–3	Egypt	Lisbon, Portugal
19:45 WET (UTC±0)	Figueiredo 23'; Flávio 38' (pen.); Manucho 47'	Report	Moteab 6', 24', 62'	Stadium: Complexo Desportivo FC Alverca

22 January 2008 Africa Cup of Nations Group C	Egypt	4–2	Cameroon	Kumasi, Ghana
17:00 GMT (UTC±0)	Abd Rabo 14' (pen.), 82'; Zidan 17', 45+2'	Report	Eto'o 51', 90+3' (pen.)	Stadium: Baba Yara Stadium; Attendance: 42,000; Referee: Modou Sowe (Gambia)

26 January 2008 Africa Cup of Nations Group C	Egypt	3–0	Sudan	Kumasi, Ghana
19:30 GMT (UTC±0)	Abd Rabo 29' (pen.); Abou Trika 78', 82'	Report		Stadium: Baba Yara Stadium; Attendance: 15,000; Referee: Coffi Codjia (Benin)

30 January 2008 Africa Cup of Nations Group C	Egypt	1–1	Zambia	Kumasi, Ghana
17:00 GMT (UTC±0)	Zaki 15'	Report	C. Katongo 87'	Stadium: Baba Yara Stadium; Attendance: 2,000; Referee: Koman Coulibaly (Mali)

4 February 2008 Africa Cup of Nations Quarter-finals	Egypt	2–1	Angola	Kumasi, Ghana
17:00 GMT (UTC±0)	Abd Rabo 23' (pen.); Zaki 38'	Report	Manucho 26'	Stadium: Baba Yara Stadium; Attendance: 6,000; Referee: Yuichi Nishimura (Japan)

7 February 2008 Africa Cup of Nations Semi-finals	Ivory Coast	1–4	Egypt	Kumasi, Ghana
20:30 GMT (UTC±0)	Keïta 64'	Report	Fathy 12'; Zaki 62', 67'; Abou Trika 90+2'	Stadium: Baba Yara Stadium; Attendance: 30,000; Referee: Eddy Maillet (Seychelles)

10 February 2008 Africa Cup of Nations Final	Cameroon	0–1	Egypt	Accra, Ghana
17:00 GMT (UTC±0)		Report	Abou Trika 77'	Stadium: Ohene Djan Stadium; Attendance: 50,000; Referee: Coffi Codjia (Benin)

26 March Friendly	Egypt	0–2	Argentina	Cairo, Egypt
20:30 CAT (UTC+2)		Report	Agüero 65'; Burdisso 84'	Stadium: Cairo International Stadium; Attendance: 30,000; Referee: Djamel Haimoudi (Algeria)

1 June 2010 FIFA World Cup qualification	Egypt	2–1	DR Congo	Cairo, Egypt
21:00 CAST (UTC+3)	Zaki 68'; Abdel Malek 80'	Report	Ilunga 43'	Stadium: Cairo International Stadium; Attendance: 40,000; Referee: Rajindraparsad Seechurn (Mauritius)
Note: This was a combined 2010 FIFA World Cup and 2010 Africa Cup of Nations qualification match.

6 June 2010 FIFA World Cup qualification	Djibouti	0–4	Egypt	Djibouti City, Djibouti
15:00 EAT (UTC+3)		Report	Zaki 40'; Abd Rabo 46' (pen.); A. Hassan I 53'; Abdel Malek 64'	Stadium: El Hadj Hassan Gouled Aptidon Stadium; Attendance: 6,000; Referee: Amanuel Eyob (Eritrea)
Note: This was a combined 2010 FIFA World Cup and 2010 Africa Cup of Nations qualification match.

14 June 2010 FIFA World Cup qualification	Malawi	1–0	Egypt	Blantyre, Malawi
14:30 CAT (UTC+2)	Msowoya 90+3'	Report		Stadium: Kamuzu Stadium; Attendance: 40,000; Referee: Yakhouba Keita (Guinea)
Note: This was a combined 2010 FIFA World Cup and 2010 Africa Cup of Nations qualification match.

22 June 2010 FIFA World Cup qualification	Egypt	2–0	Malawi	Cairo, Egypt
21:00 CAST (UTC+3)	Moteab 17', 50'	Report		Stadium: Cairo International Stadium; Attendance: 20,000; Referee: Badara Diatta (Senegal)
Note: This was a combined 2010 FIFA World Cup and 2010 Africa Cup of Nations qualification match.

20 August Friendly	Sudan	4–0	Egypt	Omdurman, Sudan
20:00 CAT (UTC+2)	Fathalla 35' (o.g.); El Tahir 81', 90'; Hamad 89'	Report		Stadium: Al Merrikh Stadium; Attendance: 40,000

7 September 2010 FIFA World Cup qualification	DR Congo	0–1	Egypt	Kinshasa, DR Congo
15:30 WAT (UTC+1)		Report	Abou Trika 30'	Stadium: Stade des Martyrs; Attendance: 80,000; Referee: Daniel Bennett (South Africa)
Note: This was a combined 2010 FIFA World Cup and 2010 Africa Cup of Nations qualification match.

12 October 2010 FIFA World Cup qualification	Egypt	4–0	Djibouti	Cairo, Egypt
20:00 CAT (UTC+2)	Moteab 18'; A. Hassan I 49'; Abou Trika 65'; Riyad 90+1' (o.g.)	Report		Stadium: Cairo Military Academy Stadium; Attendance: 10,000; Referee: Lassina Paré (Burkina Faso)
Note: This was a combined 2010 FIFA World Cup and 2010 Africa Cup of Nations qualification match.

19 November Friendly	Egypt	5–1	Benin	Cairo, Egypt
20:00 CAT (UTC+1)	Abd Rabo 21' (pen.); Moteab 27', 41'; Abou Trika 43', 74'	Report	Omotoyossi 85'	Stadium: Cairo International Stadium

=== 2009 ===
23 January Friendly	Egypt	1–0	Kenya	Cairo, Egypt
20:00 CAT (UTC+2)	A. Hassan I 26'	Report		Stadium: Cairo International Stadium

11 February Friendly	Egypt	2–2	Ghana	Cairo, Egypt
20:00 CAT (UTC+2)	Shawky 40'; Moteab 82'	Report	Appiah 50' (pen.); Tagoe 78'	Stadium: Cairo International Stadium

29 March 2010 FIFA World Cup qualification	Egypt	1–1	Zambia	Cairo, Egypt
20:30 CAST (UTC+3)	Zaki 27'	Report	Kasonde 56'	Stadium: Cairo International Stadium; Attendance: 70,000; Referee: Koman Coulibaly (Mali)
Note: This was a combined 2010 FIFA World Cup and 2010 Africa Cup of Nations qualification match.

30 May Friendly	Oman	0–1	Egypt	Muscat, Oman
19:00 GST (UTC+4)		Report	Abou Trika 49'	Stadium: Sultan Qaboos Sports Complex

7 June 2010 FIFA World Cup qualification	Algeria	3–1	Egypt	Blida, Algeria
20:30 WAT (UTC+1)	Matmour 60'; Ghezzal 64'; Djebbour 77'	Report	Abou Trika 86'	Stadium: Stade Mustapha Tchaker; Attendance: 26,500; Referee: Daniel Bennett (South Africa)
Note: This was a combined 2010 FIFA World Cup and 2010 Africa Cup of Nations qualification match.

15 June 2009 FIFA Confederations Cup Group B	Brazil	4–3	Egypt	Bloemfontein, South Africa
16:00 SAST (UTC+2)	Kaká 5', 90' (pen.); Luís Fabiano 11'; Juan 73'	Report	Zidan 9', 55'; Shawky 54'	Stadium: Free State Stadium; Attendance: 27,851; Referee: Howard Webb (England)

18 June 2009 FIFA Confederations Cup Group B	Egypt	1–0	Italy	Johannesburg, South Africa
20:30 SAST (UTC+2)	Homos 39'	Report		Stadium: Ellis Park Stadium; Attendance: 52,150; Referee: Martin Hansson (Sweden)

21 June 2009 FIFA Confederations Cup Group B	Egypt	0–3	United States	Rustenburg, South Africa
20:30 SAST (UTC+2)		Report	Davies 21'; Bradley 63'; Dempsey 71'	Stadium: Royal Bafokeng Stadium; Attendance: 23,140; Referee: Michael Hester (New Zealand)

5 July 2010 FIFA World Cup qualification	Egypt	3–0	Rwanda	Cairo, Egypt
20:30 CAST (UTC+3)	Abou Trika 64', 90'; Abd Rabo 74' (pen.)	Report		Stadium: Cairo Military Academy Stadium; Attendance: 18,000; Referee: Emmanuel Imiere (Nigeria)
Note: This was a combined 2010 FIFA World Cup and 2010 Africa Cup of Nations qualification match.

12 August Friendly	Egypt	3–3	Guinea	Cairo, Egypt
20:30 CAST (UTC+3)	Abd Rabo 4', 32'; Abdel Malek 90+4'	Report	Youla 30', 41'; Diawara 47'	Stadium: Cairo International Stadium

5 September 2010 FIFA World Cup qualification	Rwanda	0–1	Egypt	Kigali, Rwanda
15:30 CAT (UTC+2)		Report	A. Hassan I 67'	Stadium: Amahoro Stadium; Attendance: 20,000; Referee: Joseph Lamptey (Ghana)
Note: This was a combined 2010 FIFA World Cup and 2010 Africa Cup of Nations qualification match.

2 October Friendly	Egypt	4–0	Mauritius	Cairo, Egypt
19:30 CAT (UTC+2)	Abou Trika 7', 83'; A. Hassan I 18' (pen.); Zaki 90+5' (pen.)	Report		Stadium: Petro Sport Stadium

10 October 2010 FIFA World Cup qualification	Zambia	0–1	Egypt	Chililabombwe, Zambia
14:00 CAT (UTC+2)		Report	Abd Rabo 69'	Stadium: Konkola Stadium; Attendance: 10,000; Referee: Kokou Djaoupe (Togo)
Note: This was a combined 2010 FIFA World Cup and 2010 Africa Cup of Nations qualification match.

5 November Friendly	Egypt	5–1	Tanzania	Aswan, Egypt
20:00 CAT (UTC+2)	Moteab 8', 32'; Zaki 19'; Barakat 40'; Abdel Raouf 86'	Report	Makasi 45'	Stadium: Aswan Stadium

14 November 2010 FIFA World Cup qualification	Egypt	2–0	Algeria	Cairo, Egypt
19:30 CAT (UTC+2)	Zaki 3'; Moteab 90+5'	Report		Stadium: Cairo International Stadium; Attendance: 75,000; Referee: Jerome Damon (South Africa)
Note: This was a combined 2010 FIFA World Cup and 2010 Africa Cup of Nations qualification match.

18 November 2010 FIFA World Cup qualification	Egypt	0–1	Algeria	Omdurman, Sudan
19:30 CAT (UTC+2)		Report	Yahia 40'	Stadium: Al Merrikh Stadium; Attendance: 40,000; Referee: Eddy Maillet (Seychelles)

29 December Friendly	Egypt	1–1	Malawi	Cairo, Egypt
20:00 CAT (UTC+2)	Abd Rabo 45+1' (pen.)	Report	Msowoya 87'	Stadium: Cairo International Stadium

== 2010s ==
=== 2010 ===
4 January Friendly	Egypt	1–0	Mali	Dubai, United Arab Emirates
20:00 GST (UTC+4)	Gedo 65'	Report		Stadium: Maktoum bin Rashid Al Maktoum Stadium

12 January 2010 Africa Cup of Nations Group C	Egypt	3–1	Nigeria	Benguela, Angola
17:00 WAT (UTC+1)	Moteab 34'; A. Hassan I 54'; Gedo 87'	Report	Obasi 12'	Stadium: Estádio Nacional de Ombaka; Attendance: 18,000; Referee: Rajindraparsad Seechurn (Mauritius)

16 January 2010 Africa Cup of Nations Group C	Egypt	2–0	Mozambique	Benguela, Angola
19:30 WAT (UTC+1)	Khan 47' (o.g.); Gedo 81'	Report		Stadium: Estádio Nacional de Ombaka; Attendance: 16,000; Referee: Kokou Djaoupe (Togo)

20 January 2010 Africa Cup of Nations Group C	Egypt	2–0	Benin	Benguela, Angola
17:00 WAT (UTC+1)	A. El Mohamady 7'; Moteab 23'	Report		Stadium: Estádio Nacional de Ombaka; Attendance: 12,500; Referee: Daniel Bennett (South Africa)

25 January 2010 Africa Cup of Nations Quarter-finals	Egypt	3–1 (a.e.t.)	Cameroon	Benguela, Angola
17:00 WAT (UTC+1)	A. Hassan I 37', 104'; Gedo 92'	Report	Emaná 25'	Stadium: Estádio Nacional de Ombaka; Attendance: 12,000; Referee: Jerome Damon (South Africa)

28 January 2010 Africa Cup of Nations Semi-finals	Algeria	0–4	Egypt	Benguela, Angola
20:30 WAT (UTC+1)		Report	Abd Rabo 38' (pen.); Zidan 65'; Abdel Shafy 80'; Gedo 90+2'	Stadium: Estádio Nacional de Ombaka; Attendance: 30,000; Referee: Coffi Codjia (Benin)

31 January 2010 Africa Cup of Nations Final	Ghana	0–1	Egypt	Luanda, Angola
17:00 WAT (UTC+1)		Report	Gedo 85'	Stadium: Estádio 11 de Novembro; Attendance: 50,000; Referee: Koman Coulibaly (Mali)

3 March Friendly	England	3–1	Egypt	London, England
20:00 GMT (UTC±0)	Crouch 57', 80'; Wright-Phillips 75'	Report	Zidan 23'	Stadium: Wembley Stadium; Attendance: 80,602; Referee: Carlos Torres (Paraguay)

11 August Friendly	Egypt	6–3	DR Congo	Cairo, Egypt
20:30 CAST (UTC+3)	Ali 2', 34'; Fathy 41'; Abou Trika 44'; A. Hassan I 49'; Gedo 66'	Report	Ilunga 16'; Matumona 54', 69'	Stadium: Cairo International Stadium

5 September 2012 Africa Cup of Nations qualification	Egypt	1–1	Sierra Leone	Cairo, Egypt
21:30 CAT (UTC+2)	Fathalla 61'	Report	Mu. Bangura 57'	Stadium: Cairo International Stadium; Referee: Badara Diatta (Senegal)

10 October 2012 Africa Cup of Nations qualification	Niger	1–0	Egypt	Niamey, Niger
15:30 WAT (UTC+1)	Maâzou 34'	Report		Stadium: Stade Général Seyni Kountché; Attendance: 35,000; Referee: Noumandiez Doué (Ivory Coast)

17 November Friendly	Egypt	3–0	Australia	Cairo, Egypt
19:30 CAT (UTC+2)	Abdel Zaher 18'; Gedo 60'; Zidan 90' (pen.)	Report		Stadium: Cairo International Stadium; Referee: Anton Genov (Bulgaria)

16 December Friendly	Qatar	2–1	Egypt	Al Rayyan, Qatar
18:00 AST (UTC+3)	Soria 21'; W. Gomaa 44' (o.g.)	Report	Soliman 73'	Stadium: Khalifa International Stadium

=== 2011 ===
5 January 2011 Nile Basin Tournament Group A	Egypt	5–1	Tanzania	Cairo, Egypt
19:00 CAT (UTC+2)	S. Hamdy 5', 57'; Abou Trika 12'; Haroub 24' (o.g.); Ali 78'	Report	Gumbo 82'	Stadium: Osman Ahmed Osman Stadium; Referee: Mohamed Hussein El Fadil (Sudan)

8 January 2011 Nile Basin Tournament Group A	Egypt	1–0	Uganda	Cairo, Egypt
19:00 CAT (UTC+2)	Gedo 90+3'	Report		Stadium: Osman Ahmed Osman Stadium; Referee: Musungayi Mpunga (DR Congo)

11 January 2011 Nile Basin Tournament Group A	Burundi	0–3	Egypt	Ismailia, Egypt
19:00 CAT (UTC+2)		Report	Gedo 2'; Ali 11'; S. Hamdy 80'	Stadium: Ismailia Stadium; Referee: Ojwang Osano (Kenya)

14 January 2011 Nile Basin Tournament Semi-finals	Egypt	5–1	Kenya	Cairo, Egypt
19:20 CAT (UTC+2)	Belal 13', 69', 90'; S. Hamdy 21'; W. Gomaa 11'	Report	Ochieng 67'	Stadium: Petro Sport Stadium; Referee: Onesimo Ndayisenga (Burundi)

17 January 2011 Nile Basin Tournament Final	Egypt	3–1	Uganda	Cairo, Egypt
18:30 CAT (UTC+2)	S. Hamdy 38', 70'; Gedo 81'	Report	Okhuti 84' (pen.)	Stadium: Cairo Military Academy Stadium; Referee: Musungayi Mpunga (DR Congo)

26 March 2012 Africa Cup of Nations qualification	South Africa	1–0	Egypt	Johannesburg, South Africa
20:05 SAST (UTC+2)	Mphela 90+3'	Report		Stadium: Ellis Park Stadium; Attendance: 55,000; Referee: Koman Coulibaly (Mali)

5 June 2012 Africa Cup of Nations qualification	Egypt	0–0	South Africa	Cairo, Egypt
20:30 CAT (UTC+2)		Report		Stadium: Cairo Military Academy Stadium; Referee: Slim Jedidi (Tunisia)

3 September 2012 Africa Cup of Nations qualification	Sierra Leone	2–1	Egypt	Freetown, Sierra Leone
16:30 GMT (UTC±0)	El Neny 15' (o.g.); Mo. Bangura 89' (pen.)	Report	M. Mohsen 44'	Stadium: National Stadium

8 October 2012 Africa Cup of Nations qualification	Egypt	3–0	Niger	Cairo, Egypt
17:00 CAT (UTC+2)	M. Mohsen 48', 71'; M. Salah 56'	Report		Stadium: Cairo International Stadium

14 November Friendly	Egypt	0–2	Brazil	Al Rayyan, Qatar
20:00 AST (UTC+3)		Report	Jonas 39', 59'	Stadium: Ahmed bin Ali Stadium; Attendance: 18,000; Referee: Banjar Al Dosari (Qatar)

=== 2012 ===
27 February Friendly	Egypt	5–0	Kenya	Al Rayyan, Qatar
19:00 AST (UTC+3)	M. Salah 10'; A. Hassan I 18' (pen.); Abdel Malek 73' (pen.); Khairy 83'; Abdel Zaher 90'	Report		Stadium: Thani bin Jassim Stadium

29 February Friendly	Egypt	1–0	Niger	Al Rayyan, Qatar
19:00 AST (UTC+3)	Abd Rabo 22' (pen.)	Report		Stadium: Thani bin Jassim Stadium

2 March Friendly	Egypt	0–0	DR Congo	Al Rayyan, Qatar
18:30 AST (UTC+3)		Report		Stadium: Thani bin Jassim Stadium

29 March Friendly	Egypt	2–1	Uganda	Khartoum, Sudan
19:00 CAT (UTC+2)	M. Salah 60'; Abou Trika 90+2'	Report	Kizito 35'	Stadium: Khartoum Stadium

31 March Friendly	Egypt	4–0	Chad	Khartoum, Sudan
18:00 CAT (UTC+2)	M. Salah 31'; Khairy 44'; Hissein 89' (o.g.); Mekky 90+1'	Report		Stadium: Khartoum Stadium

12 April Friendly	Egypt	3–2	Nigeria	Dubai, United Arab Emirates
19:30 GST (UTC+4)	Temsah 25'; Abou Trika 33' (pen.); Mekky 90+2'	Report	Mba 13'; Kalu 43'	Stadium: Maktoum bin Rashid Al Maktoum Stadium

15 April Friendly	Egypt	3–0	Mauritania	Dubai, United Arab Emirates
20:00 GST (UTC+4)	Gedo 24', 29'; Moteab 39' (pen.)	Report		Stadium: Rashid Stadium

17 April Friendly	Iraq	0–0	Egypt	Dubai, United Arab Emirates
20:00 GST (UTC+4)		Report		Stadium: Maktoum bin Rashid Al Maktoum Stadium

11 May Friendly	Lebanon	1–4	Egypt	Tripoli, Lebanon
20:30 EEST (UTC+3)	Zreik 30' (pen.)	Report	Okka 4'; Mekky 19' (pen.); Temsah 44'; Khairy 53'	Stadium: Tripoli Municipal Stadium

20 May Friendly	Egypt	2–1	Cameroon	Omdurman, Sudan
20:00 CAT (UTC+2)	A. El Mohamady 41'; Abou Trika 80' (pen.)	Report	Lauren 75' (pen.)	Stadium: Al Merrikh Stadium

22 May Friendly	Egypt	3–0	Togo	Omdurman, Sudan
20:00 CAT (UTC+2)	Gedo 26'; M. Salah 51', 86'	Report		Stadium: Al Merrikh Stadium

1 June 2014 FIFA World Cup qualification	Egypt	2–0	Mozambique	Alexandria, Egypt
20:00 CAT (UTC+2)	Fathalla 55'; Zidan 62'	Report		Stadium: Borg El Arab Stadium; Referee: Sylvester Kirwa (Kenya)

10 June 2014 FIFA World Cup qualification	Guinea	2–3	Egypt	Conakry, Guinea
17:00 GMT (UTC±0)	A. Camara 20' (pen.); L. Bangoura 88'	Report	Abou Trika 58', 66' (pen.); M. Salah 90+3'	Stadium: Stade du 28 Septembre; Attendance: 14,000; Referee: Sidi Alioum (Cameroon)

15 June 2013 Africa Cup of Nations qualification	Egypt	2–3	Central African Republic	Alexandria, Egypt
20:00 CAT (UTC+2)	Zidan 10'; M. Salah 48'	Report	Momi 26', 63'; Manga 71'	Stadium: Borg El Arab Stadium; Referee: Djamel Haimoudi (Algeria)

30 June 2013 Africa Cup of Nations qualification	Central African Republic	1–1	Egypt	Bangui, Central African Republic
15:00 WAT (UTC+1)	Kéthévoama 23'	Report	Moteab 77'	Stadium: Barthélemy Boganda Stadium; Referee: Badara Diatta (Senegal)

15 August Friendly	Oman	1–1	Egypt	Salalah, Oman
20:00 GST (UTC+4)	Al Muqbali 90+1'	Report	Mekky 60'	Stadium: Al Saada Stadium

12 October Friendly	Egypt	3–0	Congo	Sharjah, United Arab Emirates
20:00 GST (UTC+4)	Abou Trika 40', 48'; Gedo 44'	Report		Stadium: Sharjah Stadium

16 October Friendly	Egypt	0–1	Tunisia	Abu Dhabi, United Arab Emirates
20:30 GST (UTC+4)		Report	Dhaouadi 19'	Stadium: Zayed Sports City Stadium

14 November Friendly	Georgia	0–0	Egypt	Tbilisi, Georgia
20:30 GET (UTC+4)		Report		Stadium: Mikheil Meskhi Stadium; Referee: Andris Treimanis (Latvia)

=== 2013 ===
10 January Friendly	Ghana	3–0	Egypt	Abu Dhabi, United Arab Emirates
21:00 GST (UTC+4)	Agyemang-Badu 18'; Boakye 54'; Gyan 83'	Report		Stadium: Zayed Sports City Stadium; Attendance: 2,000; Referee: Mohammed Abdulla Hassan (United Arab Emirates)

14 January Friendly	Ivory Coast	4–2	Egypt	Abu Dhabi, United Arab Emirates
20:30 GST (UTC+4)	Gervinho 38' (pen.), 54'; L. Traoré 40'; Ya Konan 83'	Report	Abou Trika 20'; Gedo 61'	Stadium: Al Nahyan Stadium; Attendance: 2,500; Referee: Hamad Al Shaikh Hashmi (United Arab Emirates)

6 February Friendly	Chile	2–1	Egypt	Madrid, Spain
18:00 CET (UTC+1)	Vargas 60'; Carmona 66'	Report	M. Salah 88'	Stadium: Vicente Calderón Stadium; Attendance: 3,000; Referee: Fernando Teixeira (Spain)

7 March Friendly	Qatar	3–1	Egypt	Al Rayyan, Qatar
18:45 AST (UTC+3)	Hassan 29'; Majid 54'; Ahmed 90'	Report	Rabia 3'	Stadium: Thani bin Jassim Stadium; Attendance: 10,000; Referee: Ma Ning (China)

26 March 2014 FIFA World Cup qualification	Egypt	2–1	Zimbabwe	Alexandria, Egypt
19:00 CAT (UTC+2)	Abd Rabo 64'; Abou Trika 88' (pen.)	Report	Musona 74'	Stadium: Borg El Arab Stadium; Attendance: 10,000; Referee: Badara Diatta (Senegal)

4 June Friendly	Egypt	1–1	Botswana	Cairo, Egypt
18:00 CAT (UTC+2)	Hegazi 37'	Report	Ramatlhakwane 5'	Stadium: 30 June Stadium; Referee: Mokhtar Amalou (Algeria)

9 June 2014 FIFA World Cup qualification	Zimbabwe	2–4	Egypt	Harare, Zimbabwe
19:00 CAT (UTC+2)	Musona 21'; Zvasiya 81'	Report	Abou Trika 5'; M. Salah 40', 76', 83'	Stadium: National Sports Stadium; Attendance: 40,000; Referee: Bakary Gassama (Gambia)

16 June 2014 FIFA World Cup qualification	Mozambique	0–1	Egypt	Maputo, Mozambique
15:00 CAT (UTC+2)		Report	M. Salah 40'	Stadium: Estádio da Machava; Attendance: 25,000; Referee: Janny Sikazwe (Zambia)

14 August Friendly	Egypt	3–0	Uganda	El Gouna, Egypt
16:30 CAT (UTC+2)	A. Hassan II 22'; M. Salah 57'; I. Salah 83'	Report		Stadium: El Gouna Stadium; Attendance: 300; Referee: Khalid Abdul Rahman (Sudan)

10 September 2014 FIFA World Cup qualification	Egypt	4–2	Guinea	El Gouna, Egypt
16:00 CAT (UTC+2)	Ghaly 38'; Abou Trika 51' (pen.); M. Salah 83'; Zaki 86'	Report	El Abd 4' (o.g.); Soumah 57'	Stadium: El Gouna; Attendance: 0 Referee: Bamlak Tessema Weyesa (Ethiopia)

15 October 2014 FIFA World Cup qualification	Ghana	6–1	Egypt	Kumasi, Ghana
16:00 GMT (UTC±0)	Gyan 5', 53'; W. Gomaa 23' (o.g.); Waris 44'; Muntari 72' (pen.); Atsu 88'	Report	Abou Trika 41' (pen.)	Stadium: Baba Yara Stadium; Attendance: 38,000; Referee: Bouchaïb El Ahrach (Morocco)

19 November 2014 FIFA World Cup qualification	Egypt	2–1 (3–7 agg.)	Ghana	Cairo, Egypt
18:00 CAT (UTC+2)	Zaki 25'; Gedo 83'	Report	K. Boateng 88'	Stadium: 30 June Stadium; Attendance: 25,000; Referee: Noumandiez Doué (Ivory Coast)

=== 2014 ===
5 March Friendly	Bosnia and Herzegovina	0–2	Egypt	Innsbruck, Austria
18:30 CET (UTC+1)		Report	Gedo 52'; M. Salah 64'	Stadium: Tivoli-Neu; Attendance: 14,000; Referee: Markus Hameter (Austria)

30 May Friendly	Chile	3–2	Egypt	Santiago, Chile
20:30 CLT (UTC−4)	M. Díaz 26'; Vargas 60', 78'	Report	M. Salah 12'; Kamar 16'	Stadium: Estadio Nacional Julio Martínez Prádanos; Attendance: 30,000; Referee: Óscar Maldonado (Bolivia)

4 June Friendly	Jamaica	2–2	Egypt	London, England
20:00 BST (UTC+1)	Dawkins 27'; Grant 38'	Report	El Neny 5'; Morsy 72'	Stadium: Matchroom Stadium; Attendance: 2,203; Referee: Anthony Taylor (England)

5 September 2015 Africa Cup of Nations qualification	Senegal	2–0	Egypt	Dakar, Senegal
20:00 GMT (UTC±0)	Diouf 19'; Mané 45'	Report		Stadium: Stade Léopold Sédar Senghor; Referee: Koman Coulibaly (Mali)

10 September 2015 Africa Cup of Nations qualification	Egypt	0–1	Tunisia	Cairo, Egypt
21:00 CAST (UTC+3)		Report	F. Ben Youssef 14'	Stadium: 30 June Stadium; Referee: Bakary Gassama (Gambia)

10 October 2015 Africa Cup of Nations qualification	Botswana	0–2	Egypt	Gaborone, Botswana
18:30 CAT (UTC+2)		Report	El Neny 56'; M. Salah 62'	Stadium: National Stadium; Referee: Bamlak Tessema Weyesa (Ethiopia)

15 October 2015 Africa Cup of Nations qualification	Egypt	2–0	Botswana	Cairo, Egypt
19:00 CAT (UTC+2)	Gamal 51'; M. Salah 72'	Report		Stadium: Cairo International Stadium; Referee: Bienvenu Sinko (Ivory Coast)

15 November 2015 Africa Cup of Nations qualification	Egypt	0–1	Senegal	Cairo, Egypt
19:00 CAT (UTC+2)		Report	Diouf 8'	Stadium: Cairo International Stadium; Referee: Sidi Alioum (Cameroon)

19 November 2015 Africa Cup of Nations qualification	Tunisia	2–1	Egypt	Monastir, Tunisia
20:00 WAT (UTC+1)	Chikhaoui 52'; Khazri 80'	Report	M. Salah 14'	Stadium: Stade Mustapha Ben Jannet; Referee: Noumandiez Doué (Ivory Coast)

=== 2015 ===
26 March Friendly	Egypt	2–0	Equatorial Guinea	Cairo, Egypt
18:00 CAT (UTC+2)	Morsy 86'; Trézéguet 90+4'	Report		Stadium: Petro Sport Stadium; Referee: Mahmoud El Banna (Egypt)

8 June Friendly	Egypt	2–1	Malawi	Alexandria, Egypt
18:00 CAT (UTC+2)	Mekky 19'; El Gabbas 47'	Report	Banda 64'	Stadium: Borg El Arab Stadium; Referee: Ibrahim Nour El Din (Egypt)

14 June 2017 Africa Cup of Nations qualification	Egypt	3–0	Tanzania	Alexandria, Egypt
19:00 CAT (UTC+2)	Rabia 60'; Morsy 64'; M. Salah 69'	Report		Stadium: Borg El Arab Stadium; Referee: Bamlak Tessema Weyesa (Ethiopia)

6 September 2017 Africa Cup of Nations qualification	Chad	1–5	Egypt	N'Djamena, Chad
17:00 WAT (UTC+1)	Haroun 37'	Report	Morsy 2', 25', 62'; M. Salah 40'; Kahraba 56'	Stadium: Stade Omnisports Idriss Mahamat Ouya; Referee: Bienvenu Sinko (Ivory Coast)
Note: On 27 March 2016, the Chadian Football Federation announced its withdrawal from the 2017 Africa Cup of Nations qualification. The CAF accepted their withdrawal and their results were expunged.

11 October Friendly	Egypt	3–0	Zambia	Abu Dhabi, United Arab Emirates
21:00 GST (UTC+4)	A. Hassan II 3', 48'; Gamal 90+4'	Report		Stadium: Mohammed Bin Zayed Stadium; Attendance: 4,000; Referee: Mohamed Al Zarouni (United Arab Emirates)

14 November 2018 FIFA World Cup qualification	Chad	1–0	Egypt	N'Djamena, Chad
16:30 WAT (UTC+1)	N'Douassel 73'	Report		Stadium: Stade Omnisports Idriss Mahamat Ouya; Attendance: 10,000; Referee: Anietie Ferdinand Udoh (Nigeria)

17 November 2018 FIFA World Cup qualification	Egypt	4–0 (4–1 agg.)	Chad	Alexandria, Egypt
18:30 CAT (UTC+2)	El Neny 5'; A. El Said 10'; A. Hassan II 36', 40'	Report		Stadium: Borg El Arab Stadium; Attendance: 35,000; Referee: Thierry Nkurunziza (Burundi)

=== 2016 ===
27 January Friendly	Egypt	0–1	Jordan	Aswan, Egypt
18:00 CAT (UTC+2)		Report	Samir 18'	Stadium: Aswan Stadium; Attendance: 5,000; Referee: Mahmoud El Banna (Egypt)

29 January Friendly	Egypt	2–0	Libya	Aswan, Egypt
18:00 CAT (UTC+2)	Gabr 30'; Morsy 74'	Report		Stadium: Aswan Stadium; Attendance: 7,000; Referee: Gehad Grisha (Egypt)

27 February Friendly	Egypt	2–0	Burkina Faso	Alexandria, Egypt
18:00 CAT (UTC+2)	A. El Said 24', 58' (pen.)	Report		Stadium: Borg El Arab Stadium; Attendance: 3,000; Referee: Ibrahim Nour El Din (Egypt)

25 March 2017 Africa Cup of Nations qualification	Nigeria	1–1	Egypt	Kaduna, Nigeria
17:00 WAT (UTC+1)	Etebo 60'	Report	M. Salah 90+1'	Stadium: Ahmadu Bello Stadium; Referee: Janny Sikazwe (Zambia)

29 March 2017 Africa Cup of Nations qualification	Egypt	1–0	Nigeria	Alexandria, Egypt
19:00 CAT (UTC+2)	Ramadan 65'	Report		Stadium: Borg El Arab Stadium; Attendance: 65,000; Referee: Daniel Bennett (South Africa)

4 June 2017 Africa Cup of Nations qualification	Tanzania	0–2	Egypt	Dar es Salaam, Tanzania
16:00 EAT (UTC+3)		Report	M. Salah 44', 58'	Stadium: National Stadium; Referee: Eric Otogo-Castane (Gabon)

30 August Friendly	Egypt	1–1	Guinea	Alexandria, Egypt
20:30 CAT (UTC+2)	Trézéguet 36'	Report	L. Bangoura 68'	Stadium: Borg El Arab Stadium; Attendance: 5,000; Referee: Gehad Grisha (Egypt)

6 September 2016 Nelson Mandela Challenge	South Africa	1–0	Egypt	Johannesburg, South Africa
19:00 SAST (UTC+2)	Makola 7'	Report		Stadium: Orlando Stadium; Attendance: 19,000; Referee: Davies Omweno (Kenya)

9 October 2018 FIFA World Cup qualification	Congo	1–2	Egypt	Brazzaville, Congo
15:30 WAT (UTC+1)	Doré 24'	Report	M. Salah 41'; A. El Said 58'	Stadium: Stade Municipal de Kintélé; Attendance: 27,000; Referee: Denis Dembélé (Ivory Coast)

13 November 2018 FIFA World Cup qualification	Egypt	2–0	Ghana	Alexandria, Egypt
18:00 CAT (UTC+2)	M. Salah 43' (pen.); A. El Said 86'	Report		Stadium: Borg El Arab Stadium; Attendance: 70,000; Referee: Eric Otogo-Castane (Gabon)

=== 2017 ===
8 January Friendly	Egypt	1–0	Tunisia	Cairo, Egypt
18:00 CAT (UTC+2)	M. Mohsen 90+1'	Report		Stadium: Cairo International Stadium; Attendance: 15,000; Referee: Yaqoub Al Hammadi (United Arab Emirates)

17 January 2017 Africa Cup of Nations Group D	Mali	0–0	Egypt	Port-Gentil, Gabon
20:00 WAT (UTC+1)		Report		Stadium: Stade de Port-Gentil; Referee: Daniel Bennett (South Africa)

21 January 2017 Africa Cup of Nations Group D	Egypt	1–0	Uganda	Port-Gentil, Gabon
20:00 WAT (UTC+1)	A. El Said 89'	Report		Stadium: Stade de Port-Gentil; Referee: Malang Diedhiou (Senegal)

25 January 2017 Africa Cup of Nations Group D	Egypt	1–0	Ghana	Port-Gentil, Gabon
20:00 WAT (UTC+1)	M. Salah 11'	Report		Stadium: Stade de Port-Gentil; Referee: Bakary Gassama (Gambia)

29 January 2017 Africa Cup of Nations Quarter-finals	Egypt	1–0	Morocco	Port-Gentil, Gabon
20:00 WAT (UTC+1)	Kahraba 88'	Report		Stadium: Stade de Port-Gentil; Referee: Eric Otogo-Castane (Gabon)

1 February 2017 Africa Cup of Nations Semi-finals	Burkina Faso	1–1 (a.e.t.) (3–4 p)	Egypt	Libreville, Gabon
20:00 WAT (UTC+1)	Bancé 73'	Report	M. Salah 67'	Stadium: Stade de l'Amitié; Referee: Malang Diedhiou (Senegal)
	Penalties
	Al. Traoré (penalty scored); Diawara (penalty scored); Yago (penalty scored); Koffi (penalty missed); B. Traoré (penalty missed)		(penalty missed) A. El Said; (penalty scored) Ramadan; (penalty scored) Hegazi; (penalty scored) M. Salah; (penalty scored) Warda

5 February 2017 Africa Cup of Nations Final	Egypt	1–2	Cameroon	Libreville, Gabon
20:00 WAT (UTC+1)	El Neny 22'	Report	Nkoulou 60'; Aboubakar 88'	Stadium: Stade de l'Amitié; Attendance: 38,250; Referee: Janny Sikazwe (Zambia)

28 March Friendly	Egypt	3–0	Togo	Alexandria, Egypt
18:00 CAT (UTC+2)	Kahraba 49'; El Sheikh 56'; El Neny 63'	Report		Stadium: Borg El Arab Stadium; Attendance: 10,000; Referee: Mohamed El Hanafy (Egypt)

11 June 2019 Africa Cup of Nations qualification	Tunisia	1–0	Egypt	Radès, Tunisia
23:00 WAT (UTC+1)	Khenissi 48'	Report		Stadium: Stade Olympique de Radès; Attendance: 45,000; Referee: Bouchaïb El Ahrach (Morocco)

12 August 2018 African Nations Championship qualification	Egypt	1–1	Morocco	Alexandria, Egypt
19:00 CAT (UTC+2)	El Sheikh 4' (pen.)	Report	Benoun 52'	Stadium: Alexandria Stadium; Referee: Mohamed Ragab Omar (Libya)

18 August 2018 African Nations Championship qualification	Morocco	3–1 (4–2 agg.)	Egypt	Rabat, Morocco
20:00 WEST (UTC+1)	El Yamiq 51'; Makran 54'; Boulahroud 70' (pen.)	Report	Semmoumy 86' (o.g.)	Stadium: Prince Moulay Abdellah Stadium; Referee: Sadok Selmi (Tunisia)

31 August 2018 FIFA World Cup qualification	Uganda	1–0	Egypt	Kampala, Uganda
16:00 EAT (UTC+3)	Okwi 51'	Report		Stadium: Mandela National Stadium; Attendance: 30,000; Referee: Ali Lemghaifry (Mauritania)

5 September 2018 FIFA World Cup qualification	Egypt	1–0	Uganda	Alexandria, Egypt
20:00 CAT (UTC+2)	M. Salah 6'	Report		Stadium: Borg El Arab Stadium; Attendance: 80,000; Referee: Victor Gomes (South Africa)

8 October 2018 FIFA World Cup qualification	Egypt	2–1	Congo	Alexandria, Egypt
19:00 CAT (UTC+2)	M. Salah 63', 90+5' (pen.)	Report	Bouka Moutou 87'	Stadium: Borg El Arab Stadium; Attendance: 86,000; Referee: Bakary Gassama (Gambia)

12 November 2018 FIFA World Cup qualification	Ghana	1–1	Egypt	Cape Coast, Ghana
15:30 GMT (UTC±0)	Gyasi 64'	Report	Shikabala 61'	Stadium: Cape Coast Sports Stadium; Attendance: 14,000; Referee: Malang Diedhiou (Senegal)

=== 2018 ===
23 March Friendly	Portugal	2–1	Egypt	Zürich, Switzerland
20:45 CET (UTC+1)	Ronaldo 90+2', 90+4'	Report	M. Salah 56'	Stadium: Letzigrund; Attendance: 19,869; Referee: Paolo Mazzoleni (Italy)

27 March Friendly	Egypt	0–1	Greece	Zürich, Switzerland
20:00 CEST (UTC+2)		Report	Karelis 29'	Stadium: Letzigrund; Attendance: 2,000; Referee: Adrien Jaccottet (Switzerland)

25 May Friendly	Kuwait	1–1	Egypt	Kuwait City, Kuwait
22:00 AST (UTC+3)	Al Ansari 6'	Report	Ashraf 81'	Stadium: Jaber Al Ahmad International Stadium; Attendance: 23,500; Referee: Ovidiu Hațegan (Romania)

1 June Friendly	Egypt	0–0	Colombia	Bergamo, Italy
21:15 CEST (UTC+2)		Report		Stadium: Stadio Atleti Azzurri d'Italia; Attendance: 3,883; Referee: Paolo Mazzoleni (Italy)

6 June Friendly	Belgium	3–0	Egypt	Brussels, Belgium
20:45 CEST (UTC+2)	R. Lukaku 27'; E. Hazard 38'; Fellaini 90+2'	Report		Stadium: King Baudouin Stadium; Attendance: 27,724; Referee: Anastasios Sidiropoulos (Greece)

15 June 2018 FIFA World Cup Group A	Egypt	0–1	Uruguay	Ekaterinburg, Russia
17:00 YEKT (UTC+5)		Report	Giménez 89'	Stadium: Ekaterinburg Arena; Attendance: 27,015; Referee: Björn Kuipers (Netherlands)

19 June 2018 FIFA World Cup Group A	Russia	3–1	Egypt	Saint Petersburg, Russia
21:00 MSK (UTC+3)	Fathy 47' (o.g.); Cheryshev 59'; Dzyuba 62'	Report	M. Salah 73' (pen.)	Stadium: Krestovsky Stadium; Attendance: 64,468; Referee: Enrique Cáceres (Paraguay)

25 June 2018 FIFA World Cup Group A	Saudi Arabia	2–1	Egypt	Volgograd, Russia
17:00 MSK (UTC+3)	Al Faraj 45+6' (pen.); Al Dawsari 90+5'	Report	M. Salah 22'	Stadium: Volgograd Arena; Attendance: 36,823; Referee: Wilmar Roldán (Colombia)

8 September 2019 Africa Cup of Nations qualification	Egypt	6–0	Niger	Alexandria, Egypt
20:00 CAT (UTC+2)	M. Mohsen 13'; Ashraf 19'; M. Salah 29', 86'; S. Mohsen 73'; El Neny 90+2'	Report		Stadium: Borg El Arab Stadium; Attendance: 25,000; Referee: Maguette N'Diaye (Senegal)

12 October 2019 Africa Cup of Nations qualification	Egypt	4–1	Eswatini	Cairo, Egypt
19:00 CAT (UTC+2)	A. El Mohamady 7'; Warda 10'; Trézéguet 29'; M. Salah 45'	Report	Gamedze 85'	Stadium: Al Salam Stadium; Attendance: 20,000; Referee: Louis Hakizimana (Rwanda)

16 October 2019 Africa Cup of Nations qualification	Eswatini	0–2	Egypt	Manzini, Eswatini
15:00 SAST (UTC+2)		Report	Hegazi 19'; M. Mohsen 53'	Stadium: Mavuso Sports Centre; Referee: Mahmoud Ismail (Sudan)

16 November 2019 Africa Cup of Nations qualification	Egypt	3–2	Tunisia	Alexandria, Egypt
18:00 CAT (UTC+2)	Trézéguet 32'; B. El Mohamady 60'; M. Salah 90'	Report	Sliti 14', 72'	Stadium: Borg El Arab Stadium; Referee: Victor Gomes (South Africa)

=== 2019 ===
23 March 2019 Africa Cup of Nations qualification	Niger	1–1	Egypt	Niamey, Niger
16:30 WAT (UTC+1)	Moutari 82'	Report	Trézéguet 47'	Stadium: Stade Général Seyni Kountché; Referee: Ring Nyier Akech Malong (South Sudan)

26 March Friendly	Nigeria	1–0	Egypt	Asaba, Nigeria
18:00 WAT (UTC+1)	Onuachu 1'	Report		Stadium: Stephen Keshi Stadium; Referee: Charles Bulu (Ghana)

13 June Friendly	Egypt	1–0	Tanzania	Alexandria, Egypt
21:00 CAT (UTC+2)	A. El Mohamady 64'	Report		Stadium: Borg El Arab Stadium; Attendance: 10,000; Referee: Mohamed Adel (Egypt)

16 June Friendly	Egypt	3–1	Guinea	Alexandria, Egypt
21:00 CAT (UTC+2)	M. Mohsen 11'; Ali 77'; Gaber 86'	Report	Kaba 63'	Stadium: Borg El Arab Stadium; Attendance: 10,000; Referee: Mohamed Adel (Egypt)

21 June 2019 Africa Cup of Nations Group A	Egypt	1–0	Zimbabwe	Cairo, Egypt
22:00 CAT (UTC+2)	Trézéguet 41'	Report		Stadium: Cairo International Stadium; Attendance: 73,299; Referee: Sidi Alioum (Cameroon)

26 June 2019 Africa Cup of Nations Group A	Egypt	2–0	DR Congo	Cairo, Egypt
22:00 CAT (UTC+2)	A. El Mohamady 25'; M. Salah 43'	Report		Stadium: Cairo International Stadium; Attendance: 74,219; Referee: Victor Gomes (South Africa)

30 June 2019 Africa Cup of Nations Group A	Uganda	0–2	Egypt	Cairo, Egypt
21:00 CAT (UTC+2)		Report	M. Salah 36'; A. El Mohamady 45+1'	Stadium: Cairo International Stadium; Attendance: 74,566; Referee: Maguette N'Diaye (Senegal)

6 July 2019 Africa Cup of Nations Round of 16	Egypt	0–1	South Africa	Cairo, Egypt
21:00 CAT (UTC+2)		Report	Lorch 85'	Stadium: Cairo International Stadium; Attendance: 75,000; Referee: Eric Otogo-Castane (Gabon)

14 October Friendly	Egypt	1–0	Botswana	Alexandria, Egypt
19:00 CAT (UTC+2)	H. Fathy 74'	Report		Stadium: Borg El Arab Stadium; Referee: Ibrahim Nour El Din (Egypt)

7 November Friendly	Egypt	1–0	Liberia	Alexandria, Egypt
18:00 CAT (UTC+2)	H. Fathy 84'	Report		Stadium: Borg El Arab Stadium; Referee: Ahmed El Ghandour (Egypt)

14 November 2021 Africa Cup of Nations qualification	Egypt	1–1	Kenya	Alexandria, Egypt
18:00 CAT (UTC+2)	Kahraba 42'	Report	Olunga 67'	Stadium: Borg El Arab Stadium; Referee: Sidi Alioum (Cameroon)

18 November 2021 Africa Cup of Nations qualification	Comoros	0–0	Egypt	Moroni, Comoros
16:00 EAT (UTC+3)		Report		Stadium: Stade Omnisports de Malouzini; Referee: Bienvenu Sinko (Ivory Coast)

== Head-to-head records ==
Head-to-head records
Opponent	P	W	D	L	GF	GA	W%	D%	L%
Algeria	7	3	1	3	14	9	42.86	14.29	42.86
Angola	2	1	1	0	5	4	50	50	0
Argentina	1	0	0	1	0	2	0	0	100
Australia	1	1	0	0	3	0	100	0	0
Bahrain	1	1	0	0	1	0	100	0	0
Belgium	2	1	0	1	4	3	50	0	50
Benin	4	3	1	0	14	5	75	25	0
Bosnia and Herzegovina	1	1	0	0	2	0	100	0	0
Botswana	6	4	2	0	7	1	66.67	33.33	0
Brazil	2	0	0	2	3	6	0	0	100
Bulgaria	1	0	1	0	1	1	0	100	0
Burkina Faso	5	2	3	0	10	6	40	60	0
Burundi	3	2	1	0	7	1	66.67	33.33	0
Cameroon	9	5	2	2	15	10	55.56	22.22	22.22
Canada	1	1	0	0	3	0	100	0	0
Central African Republic	2	0	1	1	3	4	0	50	50
Chad	4	3	0	1	13	2	75	0	25
Chile	2	0	0	2	3	5	0	0	100
China	1	0	1	0	0	0	0	100	0
Colombia	1	0	1	0	0	0	0	100	0
Comoros	1	0	1	0	0	0	0	100	0
Congo	3	3	0	0	7	2	100	0	0
Denmark	1	0	0	1	1	4	0	0	100
Djibouti	2	2	0	0	8	0	100	0	0
DR Congo	7	5	2	0	17	7	71.43	28.57	0
England	1	0	0	1	1	3	0	0	100
Equatorial Guinea	1	1	0	0	2	0	100	0	0
Estonia	1	0	1	0	3	3	0	100	0
Eswatini	2	2	0	0	6	1	100	0	0
Ethiopia	1	1	0	0	4	1	100	0	0
France	1	0	0	1	0	5	0	0	100
Gabon	2	2	0	0	6	0	100	0	0
Georgia	1	0	1	0	1	1	0	100	0
Ghana	11	6	3	2	14	13	54.55	27.27	18.18
Greece	1	0	0	1	0	1	0	0	100
Guinea	5	3	2	0	14	9	60	40	0
Iran	1	0	1	0	1	1	0	100	0
Iraq	2	1	1	0	2	0	50	50	0
Italy	1	1	0	0	1	0	100	0	0
Ivory Coast	10	3	3	4	13	14	30	30	40
Jamaica	1	0	1	0	2	2	0	100	0
Japan	1	0	0	1	1	4	0	0	100
Jordan	1	0	0	1	0	1	0	0	100
Kenya	7	5	2	0	16	4	71.43	28.57	0
Kuwait	3	1	2	0	3	2	33.33	66.67	0
Lebanon	1	1	0	0	4	1	100	0	0
Liberia	1	1	0	0	1	0	100	0	0
Libya	8	4	1	3	14	6	50	12.5	37.5
Madagascar	2	1	0	1	6	1	50	0	50
Malawi	4	2	1	1	5	3	50	25	25
Mali	4	2	1	1	3	2	50	25	25
Mauritania	3	2	1	0	7	1	66.67	33.33	0
Mauritius	5	5	0	0	18	2	100	0	0
Morocco	6	1	3	2	3	5	16.67	50	33.33
Mozambique	3	3	0	0	5	0	100	0	0
Namibia	3	2	1	0	12	3	66.67	33.33	0
Niger	5	3	1	1	11	2	60	20	20
Nigeria	6	3	2	1	9	6	50	33.33	16.67
North Korea	1	1	0	0	1	0	100	0	0
Oman	2	1	1	0	2	1	50	50	0
Portugal	2	0	0	2	1	4	0	0	100
Qatar	6	3	1	2	16	7	50	16.67	33.33
Russia	1	0	0	1	1	3	0	0	100
Rwanda	3	3	0	0	9	1	100	0	0
Saudi Arabia	3	2	0	1	4	3	66.67	0	33.33
Senegal	8	4	1	3	5	5	50	12.5	37.5
Sierra Leone	2	0	1	1	2	3	0	50	50
South Africa	8	2	1	5	4	7	25	12.5	62.5
South Korea	3	1	0	2	2	3	33.33	0	66.67
Spain	1	0	0	1	0	2	0	0	100
Sudan	7	6	0	1	19	7	85.71	0	14.29
Sweden	2	2	0	0	3	0	100	0	0
Tanzania	5	5	0	0	16	2	100	0	0
Togo	4	3	0	1	8	2	75	0	25
Trinidad and Tobago	1	1	0	0	2	1	100	0	0
Tunisia	10	3	1	6	7	10	30	10	60
Uganda	11	10	0	1	20	3	90.91	0	9.09
United Arab Emirates	3	2	1	0	4	2	66.67	33.33	0
United States	1	0	0	1	0	3	0	0	100
Uruguay	2	0	0	2	0	3	0	0	100
Zambia	7	5	2	0	13	4	71.43	28.57	0
Zimbabwe	6	6	0	0	13	4	100	0	0
Totals	274	154	55	65	481	249	56.2	20.07	23.72
