= 2003 Egyptian Super Cup =

2003–04 Egyptian Super Cup
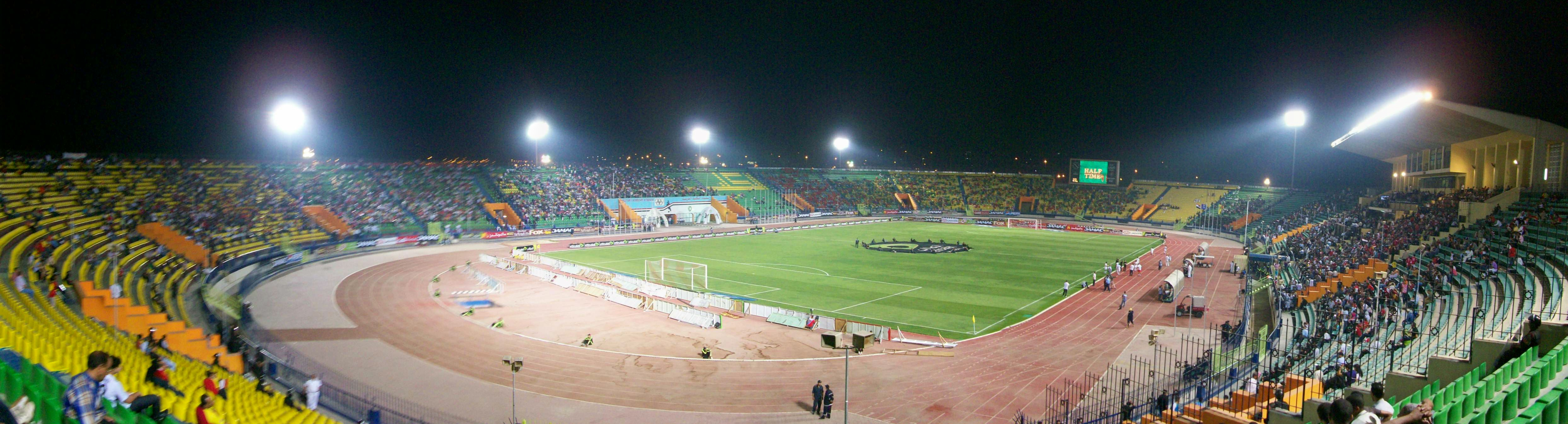
- Cairo Military Academy Stadium hosted the match
| Al Ahly | Zamalek |
| 0 | 0 |
- Al Ahly won 3–1 on penalties
- Date: 28 August 2003
- Venue: Cairo Military Academy Stadium, Cairo
- Referee: Alain Sars (France)
- Attendance: 20,000

The 2003–04 Egyptian Super Cup was the third Egyptian Super Cup, an annual football match played between the winners of the previous season's Egyptian Premier League and Egypt Cup. It was played at Cairo Military Academy Stadium in Cairo, Egypt, on 28 August 2003, contested by Al Ahly and Zamalek.

Al Ahly defeated Zamalek and won the match 3–1 on penalties after being tied 0–0.

== Details ==
28 August 2003

| Zamalek | 0–0 | Al Ahly |
|---|---|---|
| | [[[Category:All articles with unsourced statements]] Report] |
Penalties
| El-Said (penalty missed); Youssef (penalty scored); Hassan (penalty missed); Sedik (penalty missed) | 1–3 | (penalty scored) Radwan; (penalty scored) Riad; (penalty scored) Gilberto |

Cairo Military Academy Stadium, Cairo
Attendance: 20,000
Referee: Alain Sars (France)

| GK | 16 | (Egypt) Abdel-Wahed |
| LB | 2 | (Egypt) Ibrahim Hassan |
| CB | 5 | (Egypt) Besheer El-Tabei |
| CB | 15 | (Egypt) Wael El-Quabbani |
| RB | 13 | (Egypt) Tarek El-Sayed |
| CM | 27 | (Egypt) Moataz Eno | | (substituted off) 70' |
| CM | 30 | (Egypt) Abdel Hamid |
| RW | 14 | (Egypt) Hazem Emam | | (substituted off) 60' |
| LW | 19 | (Egypt) Tarek El-Said |
| FW | 24 | (Egypt) Abdel Halim | Booked | (substituted off) 46' |
| FW | 9 | (Egypt) Hossam Hassan |
Substitutes:
| DF | 3 | (Egypt) Mohamed Sedik | | (substituted in) 70' |
| RW | 17 | (Egypt) Ahmed Saleh | | (substituted in) 46' |
| FW | 29 | (Egypt) Sameh Youssef | | (substituted in) 60' |
Manager:
(Portugal) Nelo Vingada

| GK | 1 | (Egypt) Essam El-Hadary |
| LB | 3 | (Egypt) Mohamed Emara | Booked |
| CB | 7 | (Egypt) Shady Mohamed |
| SW | 20 | (Egypt) Hady Khashaba |
| CB | 26 | (Egypt) Wael Gomaa |
| RB | 22 | (Egypt) Ramy Said |
| DF | 17 | (Egypt) Mohamed Shawky |
| CM | 12 | (Angola) Gilberto |
| CM | 4 | (Egypt) Ibrahim Said | | (substituted off) 46' |
| FW | 23 | (Egypt) Mohamed Fadl | | (substituted off) 77' |
| FW | 9 | (Egypt) Khaled Bebo | | (substituted off) 46' |
Substitutes:
| FW | 11 | (Egypt) Ahmad Belal | | (substituted in) 46' |
| AM | 10 | (Egypt) Wael Riad | | (substituted in) 46' |
| CM | 8 | (Egypt) Yasser Radwan | | (substituted in) 77' |
Manager:
(Portugal) Toni
