= 2003 Saudi-Egyptian Super Cup (President Mubarak's League Winners' Super Cup) =

- Event: 2003 Saudi-Egyptian Super Cup
Zamalek	Ittihad
(Egypt)	(Saudi Arabia)
0	0
- Zamalek won 2–1 on penalties
- Date: 24 July 2003
- Venue: Cairo Stadium, Cairo
- Man of the Match: Tamer Abdel Hamid; Mohammed Noor
- Referee: Djamel Haimoudi (Algeria)
- Attendance: 50,000

2003 Saudi-Egyptian Super Cup (President Mubarak's League Winners' Super Cup), was the second tie of 2003 Saudi-Egyptian Super Cup, the match took place on 24 July 2003, at Cairo Stadium in Cairo, Egypt, between Zamalek the 2002–03 Egyptian Premier League winner, and Ittihad the 2002–03 Saudi Premier League winner.

Zamalek won the trophy after beating Ittihad 2–1 in the penalty shoot-out, with the game ending 0–0.

== Match details ==
24 July 2003
20:00 UTC+2

Zamalek (Egypt)	0–0 (a.e.t.)	(Saudi Arabia) Al-Ittihad
Penalties
El-Said (penalty missed); Mahmoud (penalty missed); Youssef (penalty scored); Sedik (penalty scored)	2–1	(penalty missed) Al-Saqri; (penalty missed) Al-Waked; (penalty scored) Tukar; (penalty missed) Idris; (penalty missed) Al-Yami

Cairo Stadium
Attendance: 50,000
Referee: Djamel Haimoudi (Algeria)

Zamalek	Al-Ittihad

Zamalek:
GK	16	(Egypt) Abdel Wahed Al Sayed
RB	2	(Egypt) Ibrahim Hassan
CB	5	(Egypt) Besheer El-Tabei
CB	3	(Egypt) Mohamed Sedik
CB	1	(Egypt) Mehdat Abdelhadi	(substituted off) ?'
LB	13	(Egypt) Tarek El-Sayed
CM	17	(Egypt) Ahmed Saleh
CM	20	(Egypt) Tamer Abdel Hamid
CM	16	(Egypt) Tarek El-Said
CF	14	(Egypt) Hazem Emam	(substituted off) ?'
CF	9	(Egypt) Hossam Hassan	(substituted off) ?'
Substitutes:
DF		(Egypt) Mahmoud Mahmoud	(substituted on) ?'
CF		(Egypt) Sameh Youssef	(substituted on) ?'
CF	23	(Egypt) Abdel Halim Ali	(substituted on) ?'
Manager:
(Portugal) Nelo Vingada

Al-Ittihad:
GK	1	(Saudi Arabia) Mabrouk Zaid
CB	13	(Saudi Arabia) Osama Al-Muwallad
CB	4	(Saudi Arabia) Redha Tukar
CB	21	(Saudi Arabia) Hamad Al-Montashari
RM	18	(Saudi Arabia) Mohammed Noor	(substituted off) ?'
CM	6	(Saudi Arabia) Khamis Al-Owairan
CM	14	(Saudi Arabia) Abdullah Al-Waked
LM	19	(Saudi Arabia) Saleh Al-Saqri
CM	8	(Saudi Arabia) Manaf Abushgeer
CF	17	(Saudi Arabia) Marzouk Al-Otaibi	(substituted off) ?'
CF	20	(Saudi Arabia) Al Hasan Al-Yami (c)
Substitutes:
CF	10	(France) Samba N'Diaye	(substituted on) ?'	(substituted off) ?'
CF	9	(Saudi Arabia) Hamzah Idris	(substituted on) ?'
CM	7	(Morocco) Hamid Nater	(substituted on) ?'
Manager:
(Saudi Arabia) Khalid Al-Koroni

Man of the Match: (Egypt) Tamer Abdel Hamid
(Saudi Arabia) Mohammed Noor

Assistant referees:

Fourth official:

2003 Saudi-Egyptian Super Cup
(President Mubarak's League Winners' Super Cup) winners
(Egypt)
Zamalek
First title
