= Tarek El-Sayed =

Egyptian footballer (born 1978)

Personal information
- Full name: Tarek Mahmoud el Sayed
- Date of birth: 9 October 1978 (age 48)
- Place of birth: Cairo, Egypt
- Height: 1.79 m (5 ft 10 in)
- Position: Left winger

Youth career
- Zamalek SC

Senior career*
Years	Team	Apps	(Gls)
1997–2008	Zamalek SC	207	(21)
2008–2009	Itesalat	13	(2)
2009–2009	Tersana		

International career^{‡}
2002–2008	Egypt	52	(5)

Managerial career
- 2014: Zamalek (Asst. coach)
- * Club domestic league appearances and goals ‡ National team caps and goals as of 22 January 2014

Tarek El Sayed (Arabic: طارق السيد; born 9 October 1978) is a retired Egyptian football player who played for Zamalek for most of his football career. He also played for Itesalat, and he played for Tersana in the Egyptian Second Division and retired after one season. He won 14 titles with Zamalek. El Sayed made several appearances for the Egypt national football team, including nine qualifying matches for various FIFA World Cups.

== Career ==
=== Zamalek ===
El Sayed played with El Zamalek for 13 seasons during which he dominated the left wing position. At the end of 2007–2008 season and after winning the Egyptian cup, El Zamalek did not include either Tarek or his teammate Besheer El-Tabei in the new season's team roster, and so both were free agents.

=== Itesalat ===
Shocked to be abandoned by his former team, he moved to Itesalat. He stayed at Itesalat for only half a season and scored 2 goals.

=== Tersana ===
In January 2009, El Sayed agreed to move to Tersana to help the team avoid relegation to the second division. El Sayed scored 2 goals for Tersana by the end of that season, but the club was eventually relegated. El Sayed announced that he would transfer to another team; however, when his transfer to either El Geish or El-Entag El-Harby did not materialize, he decided to retire.

In 2009, Tersana manager Yehia El Sayed convinced Tarek El Sayed to return to football and to lead Tersana in the Egyptian Second Division.

== Career statistics ==
=== International goals ===
Scores and results list Egypt's goal tally first.

No	Date	Venue	Opponent	Score	Result	Competition
1.	17 March 2003	Port Said Stadium, Port Said, Egypt	Qatar	4–0	6–0	Friendly
2.	15 December 2003	Bahrain National Stadium, Manama, Bahrain	Kenya	1–0	1–0	2003 Bahrain Prime Minister's Cup
3.	5 September 2004	Arab Contractors Stadium, Cairo, Egypt	Cameroon	3–0	3–2	2006 FIFA World Cup qualification
4.	5 June 2005	Arab Contractors Stadium, Cairo, Egypt	Sudan	6–1	6–1	2006 FIFA World Cup qualification

== Honours ==
Zamalek

- Egyptian Premier League: 2000–01, 2002–03, 2003–04
- Egypt Cup: 1999, 2002, 2008
- Egyptian Super Cup: 2001, 2002
- African Cup Winners' Cup: 2000
- CAF Champions League: 2002
- CAF Super Cup: 2003
- Afro-Asian Club Championship: 1997
- Arab Champions League: 2003
- Saudi-Egyptian Super Cup: 2003

Egypt

- African Cup of Nations: 2006, 2008
