= 2003 Saudi-Egyptian Super Cup =

2003 Saudi-Egyptian Super Cup, the 2nd and last Saudi-Egyptian Super Cup, league and cup champions from each Saudi Arabia and Egypt qualified, the four teams were drawn into two ties, In each tie, the two teams played an annual match, the cups winners participated on President Mubarak's Cup Winners' Super Cup, the leagues winners participated on King Fahd's League Winners' Super Cup.

== Qualified teams ==
Country	Placement	Team
Egypt	2002–03 Egyptian Premier League winner	Zamalek
Saudi Arabia	2002–03 Saudi Premier League winner	Ittihad
Egypt	2002–03 Egypt Cup runner-up	Ismaily
Saudi Arabia	2002–03 Saudi Crown Prince Cup winner	Ittihad

== Matches ==
=== King Fahd's Cup Winners' Super Cup ===
4 July 2003

Ittihad (Saudi Arabia)	1–0 (a.e.t.)	(Egypt) Ismaily
Idris 112'

Prince Abdullah al-Faisal Stadium
Referee: Qasim Hamzah (Kuwait)

=== President Mubarak's League Winners' Super Cup ===
24 July 2003
20:00 UTC+2

Zamalek (Egypt)	0–0 (a.e.t.)	(Saudi Arabia) Ittihad
Penalties
El-Said (penalty missed); Mahmoud (penalty missed); Youssef (penalty scored); Sedik (penalty scored)	2–1	(penalty missed) Al-Saqri; (penalty missed) Al-Waked; (penalty scored) Tukar; (penalty missed) Idris; (penalty missed) Al-Yami

Cairo Stadium
Attendance: 50,000
Referee: Djamel Haimoudi (Algeria)
