= Nelo Vingada =

Portuguese footballer and manager

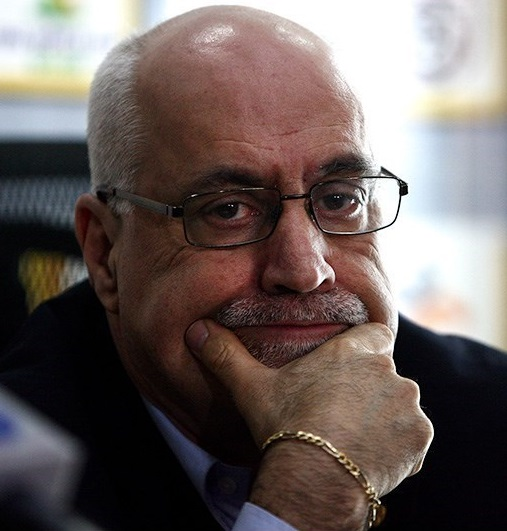
- Vingada in 2014

Personal information
- Full name: Eduardo Manuel Martinho Bragança de Vingada
- Date of birth: 30 March 1953 (age 73)
- Place of birth: Serpa, Portugal
- Height: 1.71 m (5 ft 7 in)
- Position: Forward

Senior career*
Years	Team	Apps	(Gls)
1964–1974	Atlético CP		
1974–1975	Sintrense		
1975–1979	Belenenses		

Managerial career
- 1981–1982: Belenenses
- 1982–1983: Académica
- 1983–1984: Sintrense
- 1984–1986: Vilafranquense
- 1988–1991: Portugal U-20 (assistant)
- 1993–1994: Portugal
- 1994–1995: Portugal U-20
- 1995–1996: Portugal Olympic
- 1996–1997: Saudi Arabia
- 1997–1998: Benfica (assistant)
- 1999–2003: Marítimo
- 2003–2004: Zamalek
- 2004–2005: Egypt Olympic
- 2005–2006: Académica
- 2007: Wydad Casablanca
- 2007–2009: Jordan
- 2009: Persepolis
- 2009: Al Ahly
- 2009: Vitória S.C.
- 2010: FC Seoul
- 2011–2012: Dalian Shide
- 2014: Iran (assistant)
- 2014: Iran Olympic
- 2016: Marítimo
- 2016–2017: NorthEast United
- 2017: Malaysia
- 2019: Kerala Blasters (interim)
- 2020–2022: Egypt (football director)
Medal record
Men's football
Representing Portugal (as manager)
UEFA European Under-21 Championship
Runner-up	1994
FIFA U-20 World Cup
Third place	1995
Representing Saudi Arabia (as manager)
AFC Asian Cup
Winner	1996
- * Club domestic league appearances and goals

Eduardo Manuel "Nelo" Martinho Bragança de Vingada (born 30 March 1953) is a Portuguese football manager and former footballer.

== Managerial career ==
=== Early years ===
Vingada was born in Serpa. His first steps as a professional football manager were in Belenenses, and then in Académica de Coimbra in the 1982–83 season, when he was assistant manager for Mário Wilson at Académica. Sintrense and Vilafranquense were his following teams as a manager.

In the 1986–87 season, Vingada was appointed as an assistant manager for Portugal U-20 along with Carlos Queiroz. He was the assistant manager for the Portugal national squad in the World Youth Championships of 1989 in Riyadh and 1991 in Lisbon with Carlos Queiroz as head manager, both won by Portugal.

=== Portugal U-20 ===
Vingada was appointed as a head manager for Portugal U-20 and his team participated in 1995 World Youth Championship. In this tournament, Portugal U-20 ended in the third place.

The Portugal Olympic football team under his management participated in the 1996 Atlanta Summer Olympics and after a win over Tunisia (2–0) and 1–1 draws against Argentina and the United States, they ended in second place in Group A with the same points and goal difference as the first-placed Argentinians (but with lesser goals scored). Then in the quarter-finals, a win over France (2–1) after extra-time assured them a place in the semi-finals. Once again they played against Argentina, but this time the South Americans won 2–0. For the bronze medal match, they faced Brazil. Portugal was heavily defeated by 5–0.

=== Saudi Arabia ===
In the 1996–97 season, Vingada became the manager of the Saudi Arabia national team, winning the Asian Cup in 1996, and qualifying for the 1998 FIFA World Cup, before being sacked from his position prior to the World Cup.

=== Return to Portugal ===
In the 1997–98 and 1998–99 seasons, Vingada worked as an assistant manager for Portuguese club Benfica, along with Graeme Souness as principal manager. Between 1999 and 2003, Vingada was the manager of Marítimo, a Portuguese team from Madeira, and helped the team stay in the Portuguese Liga and qualify once to the Portuguese cup final. In 2003, new Portuguese Real Madrid manager Carlos Queiroz proposed Vingada as assistant manager on 27 June but Carlos Queiroz's proposition was not accepted.

=== Zamalek ===
In the 2003–04 season, Vingada became the manager of Egyptian club El Zamalek. He helped the team win the Egyptian premier league, the Saudi-Egyptian Super Cup, and the African Super Cup against Wydad Casablanca, all in one season.

In the 2004–05 season, he became the manager of Académica de Coimbra.

=== Egypt and Jordan ===
In 2005, he became the head manager of the Egyptian national U-23 football team. The team failed to reach the Olympic Games which were being held in Beijing in 2008. Although the Egyptian Football Association wanted Vingada to continue managing the team, he resigned.

In summer 2007, Vingada signed for Moroccan club Wydad Casablanca. Only six weeks after he had assumed the new position, he resigned.

Vingada accepted the offer to manage Jordan national football team and signed a 16-month contract with the Jordan Football Association. Vingada later took on the mission to prepare the Jordanian team for the 2010 FIFA World Cup qualification. After failing to pass the first round of the qualifiers, Vingada resigned.

=== Persepolis ===
On 9 February 2009, Vingada was officially appointed as head manager of Iranian football side Persepolis. On 17 June 2009, just after five days of signing with Al Ahly he resigned due to family problems.

=== Vitória S.C. ===
On 24 June 2009 he was named as head manager Vitória S.C. in his homeland Portugal and on 7 October 2009 was sacked after four months due to poor results.

=== FC Seoul ===
He officially became a manager of FC Seoul of South Korea in January 2010. On 5 December 2010, after winning a game for 2–1, he became the Champion of South Korea, it was the first time in ten years for FC Seoul. Vingada won the K-League Cup, K-League with FC Seoul. His K-League record was 20 wins, 2 draws, 6 losses in the 2010 season. His winning percentage 71% is a record high in the K-League. On 13 December 2010 FC Seoul offered a one-year contract extension but FC Seoul and Vingada did not agree on the salary conditions. So Vingada went back to Portugal.

Vingada became head manager of Chinese Super League side Dalian Shide on 28 August 2011.

=== Iran U-23 ===
After assisting Carlos Queiroz and the Iran national football team during the qualifiers of the 2014 FIFA World Cup, he became the manager of the Iran Olympic team, signing a two-year contract until the 2016 Summer Olympics. At the 2014 Asian Games held in Incheon, South Korea, Iran was defeated 4–1 by Vietnam in their first match which was Iran's worst defeat in the tournament. They drew 1–1 with Kyrgyzstan in the next match, resulting in an early exit from the competition which was Iran's worst result in the Asian Games since its establishment. As a consequence Vingada was sacked as manager of Iran under-23 team on 9 November 2014.

=== Marítimo ===
In January 2016, he signed with Marítimo, this being the second term at the Madeiran club for him as he was their manager from 1999 till 2003. He ended his second tenure with Marítimo on 23 May 2016 to pursue his career elsewhere.

=== North East United FC ===
In July 2016, it was announced that he will be the new head coach of the North East United FC, part of the Indian Super League. He was their head coach until 15 May 2017 as he was offered a new job as Malaysia national football team head coach.

=== Malaysia ===
On 15 May 2017, Vingada was officially announced as the new head coach of Malaysia national football team with a difficult task to revive Malaysian football. He also took his trusted partner Francisco Jose Bruto da Costa as his deputy. His first match was in the 2019 Asian Cup qualifiers against Lebanon, which ended in a 1–2 defeat. His second match was in the friendly match against Syria national football team, which ended in a 1–2 defeat at Hang Jebat Stadium Melaka.

Vingada stepped down as head coach of Malaysia on 6 December 2017 by mutual consent with Football Association of Malaysia, after not winning any of his seven games in charge, and failure to qualify to the 2019 AFC Asian Cup.

=== Return to Iran ===
On 11 January 2019, Vingada rejoined the coaching staff of Iran national football team, who are participating in the 2019 AFC Asian Cup, and reunite with Queiroz.

=== Kerala Blasters FC ===
On 18 January 2019, it was announced that Vingada would be the new head coach of Kerala Blasters FC in the Indian Super League after the club sacked David James due to poor performances. With a win percent of less than 15, he too was sacked by the club at the end of the 2018–19 Indian Super League.

=== Return to Egypt ===
In 2020, Vingada became the technical director of the Egyptian national team, a position he held until April 2022, following the dismissal of head coach Carlos Queiroz.

== Managerial statistics ==
As of match played 15 March 2019

Managerial record by team and tenure
Team	Nat	From	To	Record				
Team	Nat	From	To	G	W	D	L	Win %
Portugal U-21	(Portugal)	1 July 1989	30 June 1996	18	9	4	5	50.00
Portugal	(Portugal)	14 December 1993	30 June 1994	2	0	2	0	0.00
Portugal U-20	(Portugal)	1 January 1994	30 June 1995	6	5	0	1	83.33
Saudi Arabia	(Saudi Arabia)	1 November 1996	12 October 1997	24	17	5	2	70.83
Marítimo	(Portugal)	1 January 1999	16 March 2003	136	55	28	53	40.44
Zamalek	(Egypt)	9 July 2003	17 July 2004	31	23	5	3	74.19
Académica de Coimbra	(Portugal)	23 December 2004	6 May 2006	52	16	16	20	30.77
Egypt U-20	(Egypt)	30 May 2006	30 April 2007	2	1	0	1	50.00
Wydad Casablanca	(Morocco)	1 May 2007	30 June 2007	8	3	4	1	37.50
Jordan	(Jordan)	18 August 2007	31 December 2008	31	11	7	13	35.48
Persepolis	(Iran)	9 February 2009	28 May 2009	18	8	4	6	44.44
Vitória de Guimarães	(Portugal)	26 June 2009	7 October 2009	8	2	3	3	25.00
FC Seoul	(South Korea)	3 January 2010	31 December 2010	39	27	5	7	69.23
Dalian Shide	(China)	20 July 2011	31 December 2012	46	13	16	17	28.26
Iran (Olympic)	(Iran)	1 September 2014	30 September 2014	6	0	5	1	0.00
Marítimo	(Portugal)	19 January 2016	23 May 2016	19	5	3	11	26.32
NorthEast United	(India)	16 July 2016	14 May 2017	14	5	3	6	35.71
Malaysia	(Malaysia)	15 May 2017	6 December 2017	7	0	1	6	0.00
Kerala Blasters	(India)	18 January 2019	17 March 2019	7	1	3	3	14.29
Career Total				474	201	114	159	42.41

== Honours ==
=== Assistant Manager ===
Portugal U-20

- FIFA U-20 World Cup: 1989, 1991

=== Manager ===
Portugal U-20

- FIFA U-20 World Cup: Third-place 1995

Saudi Arabia

- AFC Asian Cup: 1996

Zamalek SC

- Egyptian Premier League: 2003–04
- Saudi-Egyptian Super Cup: 2003
- Arab Champions League: 2003

Jordan

- West Asian Football Federation Championship: Runners-up 2008

FC Seoul

- K League: 2010
- League Cup: 2010

Marítimo

- Taça da Liga Runners-up: 2015–16
