= Tabei =

Tabei may refer to:

- 6897 Tabei, an asteroid named after Junko Tabei
- Besheer El-Tabei (born 1976) a retired Egyptian footballer
- Junko Tabei (田部井 淳子, 1939–2016), a Japanese mountaineer
