= Tamer Abdel Hamid =

Egyptian footballer (born 1975)

Personal information
- Full name: Tamer Abdel Hamid
- Date of birth: 27 October 1975 (age 51)
- Place of birth: Mansoura, Egypt
- Height: 1.80 m (5 ft 11 in)
- Position: Defensive midfielder

Youth career
- El Mansoura

Senior career*
Years	Team	Apps	(Gls)
1992–2000	El Mansoura		
2000–2008	Zamalek		

International career
1992–2004	Egypt	28	(2)
- * Club domestic league appearances and goals

Tamer Abdel Hamid (Arabic: تامر عبد الحميد; born 27 October 1975) is an Egyptian retired footballer who played as a defensive midfielder.

== Career statistics ==
=== International ===
National Team	Year	Apps	Goals
Egypt	1992	1	0
Egypt	2000	2	0
Egypt	2001	6	0
Egypt	2002	3	0
Egypt	2003	7	0
Egypt	2004	9	2
Total		28	2

Scores and results list Egypt's goal tally first.

No.	Date	Venue	Opponent	Score	Result	Competition
1	8 January 2004	Cairo International Stadium, Cairo, Egypt	Rwanda	2–0	5–1	Friendly
2	25 January 2004	Stade Taïeb Mhiri, Sfax, Tunisia	Zimbabwe	1–1	2–1	2004 African Cup of Nations

== Honours ==
Zamalek

- Egyptian Premier League: 2000–01, 2002–03, 2003–04
- Egypt Cup: 2001–02, 2007–08
- Egyptian Super Cup: 2001, 2002
- CAF Champions League: 2002
- CAF Super Cup: 2003
- UAFA Club Cup: 2003
- Saudi-Egyptian Super Cup: 2003
