= Somália (footballer, born 1977) =

Brazilian footballer

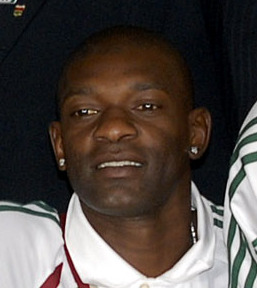

Personal information
- Full name: Wanderson de Paula Sabino
- Date of birth: 22 June 1977 (age 49)
- Place of birth: Nova Venécia, Brazil
- Height: 1.90 m (6 ft 3 in)
- Position: Striker

Youth career
- 1994–1996: América Mineiro

Senior career*
Years	Team	Apps	(Gls)
1996–1997	América Mineiro		
1997–1998	Publikum		
1998–1999	América Mineiro		
1999–2000	Feyenoord		
2001	→ Excelsior (loan)		
2001	América Mineiro		
2002–2007	São Caetano		
2002–2003	→ Al-Hilal (loan)		
2003	→ Al-Kuwait (loan)		
2004	→ Goiás (loan)		
2005	→ Grêmio (loan)		
2005	→ Santos (loan)		
2006	→ Busan I'Park (loan)		
2007–2008	Fluminense		
2009	Náutico		
2009–2010	Brasiliense		
2010–2011	Duque de Caxias		
2011	→ Figueirense (loan)		
2012–2013	Boavista		
2012	→ São Caetano (loan)		
2013	Betim		
2014	Bonsucesso		
2015	Princesa do Solimões		
2015	America-RJ		
2017	América-TO		
2018	Taboão da Serra		
- * Club domestic league appearances and goals

Wanderson de Paula Sabino (Portuguese pronunciation: [ˈvɐ̃deʁsõ dʒi ˈpawlɐ sɐˈbinu]) ([sɔˈmaʎɐ], born 22 June 1977 in Nova Venécia), nicknamed Somália, is a Brazilian former striker. He last played for Taboão da Serra.

== Honours ==
=== Club ===
Feyenoord

- Dutch League: 1998–99
- Dutch Super Cup: 1999

America

- Campeonato Carioca Série B: 2015

=== Individual ===
- UAFA Club Cup top goalscorer: 2003 (4 goals)
- São Paulo state league's top goalscorer: 2007
