= Ahmed Salah Hosny =

Egyptian footballer and actor (born 1979)

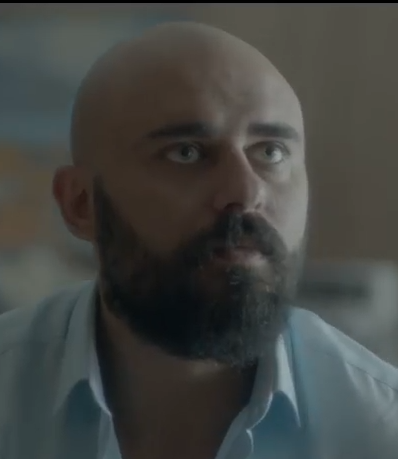

Personal information
- Full name: Ahmed Salah Mohamed Hosni Hassan
- Date of birth: 11 July 1979 (age 47)
- Place of birth: Egypt
- Height: 1.88 m (6 ft 2 in)
- Position: Striker

Senior career*
Years	Team	Apps	(Gls)
1997–1998	Al Ahly		
1998–1999	VfB Stuttgart II	25	(9)
1998–2001	VfB Stuttgart	26	(2)
2001–2002	Gent	18	(4)
2003–2004	Al Ahly		
2004–2006	Çaykur Rizespor	10	(2)
2006–2007	Al Mokawloon Al Arab		
2007–2008	Ismaily		

International career
1999–2003	Egypt	30	(9)
- * Club domestic league appearances and goals

Ahmed Salah Mohamed Hosni Hassan (Arabic: أحمد صلاح محمد حسني حسن; born 11 July 1979) is an Egyptian retired professional footballer who played as a striker. He turned to acting in 2012, after he composed songs for Mohamed Hamaki and others in 2011. He appeared in TV Shows that includes Kalabsh, Al Fetewa, and Hawary Bucharest.

== International goals ==
Scores and results list Egypt's goal tally first, score column indicates score after each Hosny goal.

List of international goals scored by Ahmed Salah Hosny
No.	Date	Venue	Opponent	Score	Result	Competition
1	6 January 2000	Aswan Stadium, Aswan, Egypt	Gabon	1–0	4–0	Friendly
2	2 February 2000	Sani Abacha Stadium, Kano, Nigeria	Burkina Faso	1–2	4–2	2000 Africa Cup of Nations
3	17 June 2000	Cairo International Stadium, Cairo, Egypt	Ghana	2–0	2–0	Friendly
4	19 March 2001	Cairo International Stadium, Cairo, Egypt	Estonia	3–3	3–3	Friendly
5	3 June 2001	Alexandria Stadium, Alexandria, Egypt	Sudan	3–0	3–2	2002 African Cup of Nations qualification
6	10 June 2001	Moi International Sports Centre, Nairobi, Kenya	Kenya	1–1	1–1	Friendly ^{1}
7	17 June 2001	Stade Félix Houphouët-Boigny, Abidjan, Ivory Coast	Ivory Coast	1–0	2–2	2002 African Cup of Nations qualification
8	4 January 2002	Ismailia Stadium, Ismailia, Egypt	Ghana	2–0	2–0	Friendly
9	11 January 2002	Cairo International Stadium, Cairo, Egypt	Burkina Faso	2–0	2–2	Friendly

^{1} Egypt goalscorer in Kenya is also accredited to Ahmed Hossam Mido.

== Honours ==
Al Ahly

- Egyptian Premier League: 1997-1998

VfB Stuttgart

- UEFA Intertoto Cup: 2000
