= Abdel-Zaher El-Saqqa =

Egyptian footballer (born 1974)

Personal information
- Full name: Abdel-Zaher El-Saqqa Ahmed Mohamed Hassan
- Date of birth: 30 January 1974 (age 52)
- Place of birth: Dakahlia Governorate, Egypt
- Height: 1.83 m (6 ft 0 in)
- Position: Defender

Senior career*
Years	Team	Apps	(Gls)
1995–1999	El Mansoura		
1999–2002	Denizlispor	66	(4)
2002–2005	Gençlerbirliği	100	(6)
2005–2007	Konyaspor	67	(4)
2007–2009	Gençlerbirliği	26	(0)
2009–2010	Eskişehirspor	37	(1)
2010–2012	ENPPI Club	24	(1)
Total		320	(16)

International career
1997–2010	Egypt	112	(4)

Managerial career
- 2015–: El-Entag El-Harby (asst.)
- * Club domestic league appearances and goals

Abdel-Zaher El-Saqqa Ahmed Mohamed Hassan (Arabic: عبد الظاهر السقا أحمد محمد حسن; born 30 January 1974) is an Egyptian retired footballer. He played 112 games for the Egypt national team, scoring 4 goals.

Beginning his career in Egypt with El Mansoura, El-Saka has also played in Turkey with Denizlispor, Gençlerbirliği, Konyaspor and Eskişehirspor.

He has Turkish citizenship with the name Abdel Zaher El Saka.

== Career statistics ==
=== International goals ===
#	Date	Venue	Opponent	Score	Result	Competition
1.	18 December 1997	Aswan Stadium, Aswan, Egypt	Togo	7–2	Win	Friendly
2.	4 January 2000	Aswan Stadium, Aswan, Egypt	Togo	2–1	Win	Friendly
3.	6 January 2000	Aswan Stadium, Aswan, Egypt	Gabon	4–0	Win	Friendly
4.	11 March 2001	International Stadium, Cairo, Egypt	Algeria	5–2	Win	2002 World Cup Qual.
Correct as of 10 December 2013

== See also ==
- List of men's footballers with 100 or more international caps
