= 2003 Bahrain Prime Minister's Cup =

2003 Prime Minister's Cup
Tournament details
- Host country: Bahrain
- Dates: 12 – 18 December 2003
- Teams: 4 (from 2 confederations)
- Venue: 1 (in 1 host city)

Final positions
- Champions: Egypt (1st title)
- Runners-up: Bahrain; Iraq
- Fourth place: Kenya

Tournament statistics
- Matches played: 6
- Goals scored: 13 (2.17 per match)

The 2003 Prime Minister's Cup was an international friendly soccer tournament. Matches were held from 12 – 18 December 2003 in Manama.

== Participants ==
- Bahrain
- Egypt
- Iraq
- Kenya

== Standings ==
Pos	Team	Pld	W	D	L	GF	GA	GD	Pts
1	Egypt	3	3	0	0	4	0	+4	9
2	Bahrain	3	1	1	1	4	4	0	4
2	Iraq	3	1	1	1	4	4	0	4
4	Kenya	3	0	0	3	1	5	−4	0

== Matches ==
12 December 2003

Bahrain	2–2	Iraq

National Stadium, Manama
12 December 2003

Kenya	0–1	Egypt

National Stadium, Manama

15 December 2003

Iraq	2–0	Kenya

National Stadium, Manama
15 December 2003

Bahrain	0–1	Egypt

National Stadium, Manama

18 December 2003

Egypt	2–0	Iraq

National Stadium, Manama
15 December 2003

Bahrain	2–1	Kenya

National Stadium, Manama
