= Fabian Kizito =

Ugandan footballer (born 1990)

Personal information
- Full name: Fabian Derrick Subi Kizito
- Date of birth: 26 July 1990 (age 36)
- Place of birth: Kampala, Uganda
- Height: 1.83 m (6 ft 0 in)
- Position: Forward

Team information
- Current team: TEC
- Number: 14

Senior career*
Years	Team	Apps	(Gls)
2010–2011	DOTO Pernis	30	(17)
2011–2012	RKSV Leonidas	25	(19)
2012–2013	DCV Krimpen		
2013–2014	Veensche Boys		
2014–2015	BVCB Bergschenhoek		
2015–2018	VV Hillegersberg		
2019	Nyköpings BIS	3	(0)
2022	Locomotive Tbilisi	0	(0)
2023–	TEC	1	(0)

International career
2012	Uganda	2	(1)
- * Club domestic league appearances and goals as of 17:19, 26 March 2023 (UTC)

Fabian Derrick Subi Kizito (born 26 July 1990) is an Ugandan professional footballer who plays as a forward for SV TEC.

== Career ==
Born in Kampala, Kizito has played club football in the Netherlands for DOTO Pernis, RKSV Leonidas, DCV Krimpen, Veensche Boys, BVCB Bergschenhoek and VV Hillegersberg. In August 2019 he signed for Swedish club Nyköpings BIS.

He earned two caps for Uganda in 2012, scoring one goal. His goal came on his debut in a friendly game against Egypt. His second game was a FIFA World Cup qualifying match against Angola.

== Career statistics ==
Scores and results list Uganda's goal tally first, score column indicates score after each Kizigo goal.

List of international goals scored by Fabian Kizito
No.	Date	Venue	Opponent	Score	Result	Competition
1	29 March 2012	Khartoum Stadium, Khartoum, Sudan	Egypt	1–0	1–2	Friendly
