= Sameh Youssef =

Egyptian footballer (born 1978)

Personal information
- Date of birth: 1 February 1978 (age 48)
- Position: Centre forward

Senior career*
Years	Team	Apps	(Gls)
1999–2003	Al Mokawloon Al Arab SC		
2003–2006	Zamalek		
2006–2007	Al Mokawloon Al Arab SC		
2007–2009	Al Ittihad Alexandria Club		
2009–2012	El Sekka El Hadid SC		

International career
- Egypt
- * Club domestic league appearances and goals

Sameh Youssef (Arabic: سامح يوسف; born 1 February 1978) is an Egyptian former professional footballer. He is best known as a former striker for Zamalek. A versatile player, he has played in multiple positions including left-back. His other clubs in Egypt have included Al Mokawloon Al Arab SC, Al Ittihad Alexandria Club, and El Sekka El Hadid SC. As of 2017, he was the technical director for Al Mokawloon Al Arab.

== Honours ==
Zamalek

- Egyptian Premier League:
  2003-04
- Arab Champions Cup:
  2003
- Saudi-Egyptian Super Cup:
  2003
