= 2003 Arab Unified Club Championship =

2003 Prince Faisal bin Fahd Tournament for Arab Clubs
بطولة الاندية العربية الموحدة 2003 بطولة الأمير فيصل بن فهد للأندية العربية 2003

Tournament details
- Host country: Egypt
- Dates: 6 – 20 July 2003
- Teams: 10 (from 1 association)

Final positions
- Champions: (Egypt) Zamalek (1st title)
- Runners-up: Kuwait SC

Tournament statistics
- Matches played: 23
- Goals scored: 72 (3.13 per match)
- Top scorer(s): (Brazil) Somália (4 goals)
- Best player: (Egypt) Besheer El-Tabei
- Best goalkeeper: (Saudi Arabia) Dhafer Al-Bishi

2003 Arab Unified Club Championship, officially named the 2003 Prince Faisal bin Fahd Tournament for Arab Clubs, was the 19th UAFA Club Cup, and the 2nd since the Arab Club Champions Cup and Arab Cup Winners' Cup were unified. The tournament began on 6 July and concluded on 20 July 2003, the matches took place in Cairo Stadium in Cairo, Egypt, Zamalek won the tournament and earning their first UAFA Club Cup title.

== Group stage ==
The ten teams were drawn into two groups of five. Each group was played on one leg basis. The winners and runners-up of each group advanced to the semi-finals.

=== Group A ===
Team	Pld	W	D	L	GF	GA	GD	Pts
(Saudi Arabia) Al-Ettifaq	4	3	1	0	10	4	+6	10
(Morocco) Raja Casablanca	4	2	1	1	6	6	0	7
(Egypt) ENPPI	4	1	1	2	4	5	−1	4
(Bahrain) Riffa	4	1	1	2	4	6	−2	4
(Jordan) Al-Faisaly	4	0	2	2	5	8	−3	2

7 July 2003

ENPPI (Egypt)	0 – 1	(Bahrain) Riffa
		Al-Khuzami 54'

7 July 2003

Al-Ettifaq (Saudi Arabia)	4 – 4	(Jordan) Al-Faisaly
Suarez 33'; Al-Meghnam 48'; Adelson 54', 85' (pen.)		Al-Sheikh 7', 79'; Al-Shabool 12'; Saleem 59'

9 July 2003

Riffa (Bahrain)	0 – 0	(Jordan) Al-Faisaly

9 July 2003

ENPPI (Egypt)	1 – 1	(Morocco) Raja Casablanca
Zaki 13'		Kouni 77'

11 July 2003

Al-Faisaly (Jordan)	0 – 1	(Morocco) Raja Casablanca
		Hirouach 42'

11 July 2003

Al-Ettifaq (Saudi Arabia)	2 – 0	(Bahrain) Riffa
Basheer 2'; Al-Basha 82'

14 July 2003

Al-Ettifaq (Saudi Arabia)	2 – 0	(Morocco) Raja Casablanca
Junior 4'; Basheer 17'

14 July 2003

ENPPI (Egypt)	3 – 1	(Jordan) Al-Faisaly
Hassan 20'; Zaki 28'; Thabet 45'		Al-Shabool 19'

16 July 2003

Riffa (Bahrain)	3 – 4	(Morocco) Raja Casablanca
Baba 4'; Essa 42'; Yousef 70'		Bidodan 9'; Aboucherouane 45', 69'; Aboucherouane 83'

16 July 2003

ENPPI (Egypt)	0 – 2	(Saudi Arabia) Al-Ettifaq
		Al-Basha 6'; Basheer 44'

=== Group B ===
Pos	Team	Pld	W	D	L	GF	GA	GD	Pts	Qualification
1	Kuwait SC	4	2	2	0	9	5	+4	8	Advance to Semi-finals
2	(Egypt) Zamalek	4	2	1	1	5	5	0	7	Advance to Semi-finals
3	(Algeria) USM Alger	4	1	3	0	7	4	+3	6	
4	(Syria) Al-Jaish	4	1	0	3	6	10	−4	3	
5	(Iraq) Al-Shorta	4	0	2	2	6	9	−3	2	

Rules for classification: Group stage tiebreakers
6 July 2003

Zamalek (Egypt)	1 – 0	(Syria) Al-Jaish
El-Said 71'

Cairo Stadium

6 July 2003

Al-Shorta (Iraq)	2 – 2	Kuwait SC
Abdulsattar 18'; Manajed 60'		Somália 13'; Sabinho 87'

8 July 2003

Al-Jaish (Syria)	4 – 2	(Iraq) Al-Shorta
Al-Omair 32', 71', 75'; Shaabo 90'		Manajed 3'; Raheem 26'

8 July 2003
21:00 UTC+3

Zamalek (Egypt)	1 – 1	(Algeria) USM Alger
El-Said 42' (pen.)		Achiou 15'

El Sekka El Hadid Stadium, Cairo
Referee: Farid Ali (United Arab Emirates)

10 July 2003

Al-Shorta (Iraq)	1 – 1	(Algeria) USM Alger
Qassem 82'		Dziri 51'

10 July 2003

Al-Jaish (Syria)	1 – 3	Kuwait SC
Shaabo 74'		Somália 18', 54'; Sabinho 68'

13 July 2003

USM Alger (Algeria)	1 – 1	Kuwait SC
Achiou 56'		Aqla 53' (pen.)

13 July 2003

Zamalek (Egypt)	2 – 1	(Iraq) Al-Shorta
Hassan 76'; Youssef 78'		Hussein 86'

Cairo Stadium

15 July 2003

USM Alger (Algeria)	4 – 1	(Syria) Al-Jaish
Ouichaoui 34' (pen.); Ammour 40'; Deghiche 84', 90'		Jabban 60'

15 July 2003

Zamalek (Egypt)	1 – 3	Kuwait SC
Youssef 45'		Aqla 6' (pen.); Al-Etaiqi 47'

Cairo Stadium

== Knock-out stage ==
Semi-finals
18 July 2003 - Cairo
(Saudi Arabia) Al-Ettifaq	1
(Egypt) Zamalek	3
18 July 2003 - Cairo
Kuwait SC	3
(Morocco) Raja Casablanca	0

Final
20 July 2003 - Cairo
(Egypt) Zamalek	2
Kuwait SC	1

=== Semi-finals ===
18 July 2003

Al-Ettifaq (Saudi Arabia)	1 – 3 (a.e.t.)	(Egypt) Zamalek
Masambe 45'		Youssef 77'; Ali 105', 114'

18 July 2003

Kuwait SC	3 – 0	(Morocco) Raja Casablanca
Al-Taher 28'; Cabral (?); Somália 90+2' (pen.)

=== Final ===
20 July 2003
20:00 UTC+2

Zamalek (Egypt)	2 – 1	Kuwait SC
Saleh 23'; Mahmoud 58'		Oliveira 88'

Cairo Stadium
Referee: Jasem Al-Hail (Qatar)

== Winners ==
2003 Prince Faisal bin Fahd Tournament for Arab Clubs
(Egypt)
Zamalek
First title

== Top scorers ==
Rank	Player	Club	Goals
1	(Brazil) Somália	Kuwait SC	4
2	(Egypt) Sameh Youssef	(Egypt) Zamalek	3
2	(Syria) Ahmed Al-Omair	(Syria) Al-Jaish	3
2	(Kuwait) Adel Aqla	Kuwait SC	3
2	(Brazil) Alessandro Oliveira	Kuwait SC	3
2	(Morocco) Hicham Aboucherouane	(Morocco) Raja Casablanca	3
2	(Saudi Arabia) Saleh Basheer	(Saudi Arabia) Al-Ettifaq	3

== Prize money ==
Competition stage	Final position	Prize money (US dollars)
Final	Winner	$50,000
Final	runner-up	$30,000
semi-final	Semi-finalists	$20,000
