= Mohamed Sedik =

Egyptian footballer (born 1978)

Personal information
- Full name: Mohamed Sedik Mohamed
- Date of birth: November 25, 1978 (age 47)
- Place of birth: Cairo, Egypt
- Height: 1.83 m (6 ft 0 in)
- Position: Defender

Team information
- Current team: Itesalat
- Number: 3

Youth career
- Mokawloon

Senior career*
Years	Team	Apps	(Gls)
1998–2001	Mokawloon	?	(?)
2001–2002	Kocaelispor	3	(0)
2002–2006	Zamalek	?	(?)
2006–2007	El-Ahly	?	(?)
2007–2008	El-Masry	3	(0)
2008–present	Itesalat	18	(0)

International career^{‡}
2002	Egypt	2	(0)
- * Club domestic league appearances and goals as of 1 July 2006 ‡ National team caps and goals as of 1 July 2006

Mohamed Sedik (Arabic: محمد صديق) (born November 25, 1978) is an Egyptian footballer. He now plays in the defender position for Itesalat.

== Titles as a player ==
5 For Ahly
1 Egyptian League (2006/2007)
1 Egyptian Cup (2006/2007)
1 Egyptian Super Cup (2006/2007)
1 African Champions League 2006
1 African Super Cup 2006

7 For Zamalek
2 Egyptian League title (2002/2003 & 2003/2004)
1 African Champions League title (2002)
1 African Super Cup title (2002)
1 Arab Club Championship Title (2003)
1 Egyptian Saudi Super Cup (2003)

1 For Kocaelispor
1 Turkish Cup Title 2002
