= Aswan Stadium =

Sports venue in Aswan, Egypt

Coordinates: 24°03′58.2″N 32°53′04.1″E

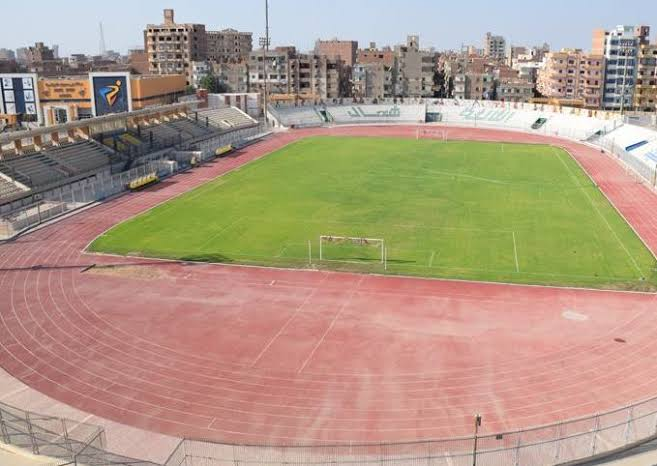
- Interactive map of Aswan Stadium
- Full name: Aswan Stadium
- Location: Aswan, Egypt
- Capacity: 11,000
- Surface: Grass

Construction
- Opened: 1962
- Renovated: 2014

Tenant
- Aswan SC

Aswan Stadium is a stadium in Aswan, Egypt. It has a capacity of 11,000 spectators. It is the home of Aswan SC.
