= Besheer El-Tabei =

Egyptian footballer (born 1976)

Personal information
- Full name: Besheer El-Tabei Abdulhamid
- Date of birth: 24 February 1976 (age 50)
- Place of birth: Damietta, Egypt
- Height: 1.82 m (6 ft 0 in)
- Position: Centre back

Youth career
- Damietta SC

Senior career*
Years	Team	Apps	(Gls)
1994–1997	Damietta SC	61	(12)
1997–2004	Zamalek SC	139	(8)
2004–2007	Çaykur Rizespor	89	(2)
2007–2008	Zamalek SC	21	(1)
2008–2009	Bursaspor	10	(1)
2009–2010	El Mansoura	10	(7)
2010–2011	Smouha	28	(6)
2011–2012	El Gaish	13	(9)

International career^{‡}
1998–2005	Egypt	38	(2)

Managerial career
- 2013: Sur (Asst.)
- 2015–2016: Zamalek SC (U-18) (Asst.)
- 2016: Ittihad El Shorta (Asst.)
- * Club domestic league appearances and goals as of June 1, 2008 ‡ National team caps and goals as of 1 July 2006

Besheer El-Tabei Abdulhamid (Arabic: بشير التابعي عبد الحميد; born 24 February 1976) is a retired Egyptian footballer. He was a powerful center back and one of the best defenders in Egypt in his early days, he is best known for playing for Zamalek SC football club where he participated in his former's club achievements in that time. He ended his career at the Egyptian side El Gaish. El Tabei was well known with his powerful free kick shots and his powerful body.

== Titles as a player ==
14 For Zamalek

- 3 Egyptian League (2000–01, 2002–03, 2003–04)
- 2 Egyptian Super Cup (2000–01, 2001–02)
- 3 Egypt Cup (1999–2000, 2001–02, 2007–08)
- 1 African Cup Winners' Cup (2000)
- 1 African Champions League (2002)
- 1 African Super Cup (2003)
- 1 Afro-Asian Cup (1997)
- 1 Arab Club Championship (2003)
- 1 Saudi-Egyptian Super Cup (2003)

Personal

- Best Player in Arab Club Championship 2003
- Best Defender in Egypt (2002)
