= Saudi-Egyptian Super Cup =

Association football tournament organized by the Saudi and Egyptian football federations

The Saudi-Egyptian Super Cup is an occasional competition organised by the Saudi and Egyptian football federations, between the league and cup champions from each federation. The cup winners from each federation participated in the President el-Sisi's Cup Winners' Super Cup, and the league winners in the King Salman's League Winners' Super Cup, and in 2022, the Lusail Super Cup. The initial competition took place only in three seasons: the first in 2001, the second in 2003, and the last in 2018. The renamed Lusail Super Cup took place in 2022 in order to showcase the Lusail Stadium, the site of the FIFA World Cup final later that year. This cup is considered a friendly tournament and is typically not taken into consideration when counting the clubs' official trophies.

== List of winners ==
| Year | King of Saudi Arabia Cup (2001-2003) - Lusail Super Cup (2022) | | | President of Egypt Cup |
| Year | Winner | Score | Runner-up | Winner | Score | Runner-up |
| 2001; Details | (Saudi Arabia) Al-Hilal | 2–1 (a.e.t.) | (Egypt) Ismaily | (Saudi Arabia) Al-Ittihad | 3–2 (a.e.t.) | (Egypt) Al-Ahly |
| 2003; Details | (Saudi Arabia) Al-Ittihad | 1–0 (a.e.t.) | (Egypt) Ismaily | (Egypt) Zamalek | 0–0 (2–1 p) | (Saudi Arabia) Al-Ittihad |
| 2018; Details | (Egypt) Al-Ahly | (Cancelled) | (Saudi Arabia) Al-Ittihad | (Egypt) Zamalek | 2–1 | (Saudi Arabia) Al-Hilal |
| 2022; Details | (Saudi Arabia) Al-Hilal | 1–1 (4–1 p) | (Egypt) Zamalek |

== Results by club ==
| Country | Club | Winners | Runners-up | Years won | Years runner-up |
|---|---|---|---|---|---|
| Egypt | Zamalek | 2 | 1 | 2003, 2018 | 2022 |
| Saudi Arabia | Al-Ittihad | 2 | 1 | 2001, 2003 | 2003 |
| Saudi Arabia | Al-Hilal | 2 | 1 | 2001, 2022 | 2018 |
| Egypt | Ismaily | 0 | 2 | | 2001, 2003 |
| Egypt | Al-Ahly | 0 | 1 | | 2001 |

== See also ==
- Saudi Arabia Football Federation
- Saudi Premier League
- Egyptian Premier League
- Egyptian Soccer League
- Egyptian Super Cup
