= 2002–03 Egyptian Premier League =

Egyptian Premier League
- Season: 2002–03
- Dates: 23 September 2002 – 23 May 2003
- Champions: Zamalek
- Relegated: Goldi, Al Mokawloon Al Arab
- Matches: 182
- Goals: 406 (2.23 per match)
- Average goals/game: 2.23

The 2002–03 Egyptian Premier League was the forty-sixth season of the Egyptian Premier League since its establishment in 1948. The season began on 23 September 2002 and concluded on 23 May 2003, with a total of 14 teams contesting the league. Zamalek won the title, with Al Ahly being the runner up.

== League table ==
Pos	Team	Pld	W	D	L	GF	GA	GD	Pts	Qualification or relegation
1	Zamalek (C)	26	21	4	1	57	10	+47	67	Qualification to Champions League
2	Al Ahly	26	21	3	2	53	13	+40	66	Qualification to Champions League
3	Ismaily	26	13	7	6	35	22	+13	46	Qualification to Confederation Cup
4	ENPPI	26	11	9	6	33	19	+14	42	
5	Sawahel	26	11	8	7	30	21	+9	41	
6	Al Masry	26	9	6	11	22	26	−4	33	
7	Ghazl El Mahalla	26	7	10	9	22	25	−3	31	
8	Baladeyet El Mahalla	26	8	7	11	21	29	−8	31	
9	Al Ittihad	26	9	4	13	24	36	−12	31	
10	Tersana	26	8	6	12	32	43	−11	30	
11	El Mansoura	26	7	8	11	20	26	−6	29	
12	Al Mokawloon Al Arab (R)	26	5	13	8	23	25	−2	28	Relegation to the Second Division
13	Goldi (R)	26	4	4	18	19	43	−24	16	Relegation to the Second Division
14	Aswan	26	2	3	21	15	68	−53	9	

Source: RSSSF
(C) Champions; (R) Relegated
