= Egyptian soccer disaster =

Egyptian soccer disaster or Egyptian soccer riot may refer to:

- Zamalek Stadium disaster
- Port Said Stadium riot
- 30 June Stadium stampede
