= Mohamed Aboutrika =

Egyptian footballer (born 1978)

Mohamed Aboutrika محمد أبو تريكة
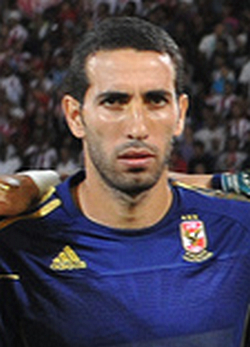
- Aboutrika lining up for Al Ahly in 2011

Personal information
- Full name: Mohamed Aboutrika
- Date of birth: 7 November 1978 (age 48)
- Place of birth: Nahia, Giza, Egypt
- Height: 1.83 m (6 ft 0 in)
- Positions: Attacking midfielder; forward

Youth career
- 1990–1997: Tersana

Senior career*
Years	Team	Apps	(Gls)
1997–2003	Tersana	52	(27)
2004–2013	Al Ahly	362	(122)
2013	→ Baniyas (loan)	12	(5)
Total		426	(154)

International career
2000	Egypt U23	1	(0)
2012	Egypt Olympic (O.P.)	4	(2)
2001–2013	Egypt	100	(38)
Medal record
Men's football
Representing Egypt
Africa Cup of Nations
Winner	2006 Egypt
Winner	2008 Ghana
- * Club domestic league appearances and goals

Mohamed Mohamed Mohamed Aboutrika (Arabic: محمد محمد محمد أبو تريكة; born 7 November 1978), known as Mohamed Aboutrika, is an Egyptian retired professional footballer who played as an attacking midfielder and a forward. He was voted first place in the African Footballer of the Year award in 2008, and was one of five nominees for the 2006 award, and one of the ten nominated for the 2013 award. He is widely regarded as one of the greatest African and Arab players of all time.

Aboutrika won the Africa Cup of Nations in 2006 with the Egyptian national team. He also scored the winning goal to help Egypt win the 2008 Africa Cup of Nations. He helped his club Al Ahly to win the bronze medal in the FIFA Club World Cup in 2006.

Off the pitch, he has been noted for both various humanitarian efforts as well as his philanthropy in Egypt.

== Club career ==
=== 2004: Debut season with Al Ahly ===
In the first half of Egyptian league 2003–2004, Aboutrika scored 3 goals for Tersana. In January 2004, he was offered a position in Al Ahly. He scored 11 goals in his first 13 appearances with Al Ahly in the 2003–2004 season (all in the league), becoming the second-highest scorer in the Egyptian League with 14 goals.

Aboutrika's efforts with Ahly drew attention from the Egyptian national team, he started his first game against Trinidad and Tobago in a friendly match before the World Cup 2006 qualifiers on 31 March 2004 in Arab Contractors Stadium. The first starting game for Aboutrika ended 2–1 for the Egyptians. He started as an attacker, but was found to play better when he played his normal position behind the attackers in the attacking midfield position. Aboutrika scored his first national goal in this game. He scored 5 goals in his first 6 appearances with Egypt between 2004 and 2005.

=== 2005 season ===
In 2005, Al Ahly regained the Egyptian League Championship after four years out of the top position, Aboutrika finished 3rd in the goalscoring rankings in the Egyptian League, while also helping his teammate Emad Moteab finish as the competition's top scorer. Also in 2005, Aboutrika played a great role in Al Ahly victory of the 2005 CAF Champions League, he scored a goal in the final from 30 yards out against Étoile Sportive du Sahel of Tunisia in a game that ended 3–0 for Al Ahly.

Al Ahly qualified for the 2005 FIFA Club World Championship but finished last, Aboutrika told FIFA.com the reason, saying: "Our problem was that we lost our form, for some reason we could not play like we had before arriving in Japan".

=== 2006 ===
He proved to be his international team's trump card en route to victory in the 2006 Africa Cup of Nations in February, when he scored two important goals against Libya and Ivory Coast. He was the winning goal assistant, in the semi-final match against Senegal when Amr Zaki scored in the 80th minute. He was very dominant in that game, but his accurate shot hit the bar. In the final match, Aboutrika scored the decisive penalty in the shoot-out which gave Egypt the title.

Aboutrika led Al Ahly to the 2006 CAF Champions League title for the second successive time in November 2006. He was the top scorer of the competition with 8 goals, and scored the winning goal in the final against CS Sfaxien in the 91st minute.

He also participated with Al Ahly in winning the CAF Super Cup against FAR Rabat of Morocco, days after the Africa Cup of Nations in February.

Locally, he got the Egyptian Premier League in June when he was the top scorer by 18 goals, and won Egypt Cup, then the Egyptian Super Cup in July when he scored the winning goal against ENPPI in the 92nd minute despite having suffered an injury in the first half.

Japanese newspapers nominated Aboutrika to be one of the best players in 2006 FIFA Club World Cup in Japan, the last tournament in Aboutrika's year. Al Ahly was one of the African representatives, and the first team ever to be qualified two successive times to this championship, and the first African team to win a medal in that competition.

In the opening match of the tournament against Auckland City FC of New Zealand on 10 December 2006, Aboutrika helped Al Ahly to secure and book a semi-final date with Internacional of Brazil. Al Ahly won 2–0, and Aboutrika scored the second goal.

In the semi-finals, Al Ahly faced Brazilian Internacional on 13 December 2006, and Aboutrika played a good game, but his accurate shot hit the Brazilian right-hand post to deprive his team from a draw. Al Ahly lost the match 2–1, but proved a good efficiency, yet the ball refused to be netted in many available chances to score in Brazilian goalkeeper.

Al Ahly faced Club América of Mexico, for the third place, and Aboutrika gave Al Ahly the lead with an amazing free-kick over the wall, ending the first half 1–0 for Al Ahly. In the second half, America scored an equalizer, Aboutrika appeared in the 79th minute with a skilled ball, he showed yet again why he is on the shortlist for the African player of the year. After surging out of midfield and finding Flavio Amado with a pinpoint pass, the mercurial playmaker latched on to the Angolan's return ball and calmly slotted the ball past the Mexican goalkeeper for his third goal of the tournament. Al Ahly won the third place, after Aboutrika lifted his team to an unprecedented result for the Egyptian club or any African outfit. He finished as the tournament's top scorer with 3 goals in 3 matches.

Aboutrika won all but one of the competitions he participated in that year for club and country, and got the bronze medal for Al Ahly in 2006 FIFA Club World Cup. He was the top scorer in three competitions, which are 2006 FIFA Club World Cup with 3 goals, Egyptian Premier League with 18 goals and 2006 CAF Champions League with 8 goals. Aboutrika scored in other competitions, and made brilliant assistants to strikers.

=== African Footballer of the Year 2006 Nomination ===
To the FIFA.com expression, He was nominated to win the 2006 CAF African Footballer of the Year award along with Chelsea striker Didier Drogba and FC Barcelona forward Samuel Eto'o. The other nominees for the honour were Chelsea and Ghana international midfielder Michael Essien, and Nigeria and Portsmouth striker Nwankwo Kanu, who previously won the award twice. Aboutrika said in November 2006: "I would love to be nominated for the CAF Best Player award. That would make 2006 a very special year!".

Aboutrika was the only African-based player between the nominees, but he was also the only one who made an achievement for his national team that year by winning 2006 Africa Cup of Nations. Aboutrika's brace in the 2006 FIFA Club World Cup and his dazzling performances throughout the season made him a serious contender for the CAF African Footballer of the Year award (as well as the BBC award) and secured his place as Egypt's most popular personality. He did not win the award but achieved second place and later was given "best interclub player" and "best player in the CAF Champions League."

"Aboutrika has won the highest prize any person can achieve, that is the love of the people," sports columnist Hassan Mistikawi wrote in the state-owned Al-Ahram daily newspaper.

Former Al Ahly coach Manuel José de Jesus described Aboutrika as "the best football player in Africa", commenting that Aboutrika did not show more of his repertoire of skills while at the Club World Cup. He said: "Aboutrika didn't introduce all what he has in FIFA Club World Cup 2006, but he got the top scorer title and helped leading his team to the third place". José also mentioned Aboutrika as one of the best players he ever trained. He reinforced this statement, saying: "Aboutrika is priceless for us. I can't imagine my team without him".

=== 2007 ===
In 2007, Al Ahly won the Egyptian Premier League (2006–2007) for the third successive season. Aboutrika scored 7 goals for his team, although he was injured. Al Ahly won the Egypt Cup 2007 for the second successive time. Aboutrika was the top goalscorer of the competition with 4 goals. He scored a double kick memorable goal against Tala'ea El-Gaish SC in the 8-round game which ended 3–1 for Al Ahly. In the final, Al Ahly faced his rival Zamalek SC. Aboutrika made a one neck-saving equalizer in the last 2 minutes on 2 July 2007 in the Egypt Cup resulting in extra-time after tying 2–2. After Zamalek grabbed their third in the first half of extra-time, Aboutrika dazzled the stands with two great balls, one an assisted cross over the whites' defense to Osama Hosny to score the equalizer in the second half of extra-time in the first seconds of the game and within a minute, he surged between the Zamalek's midfield and passed two Zamalek players before providing an accurate through pass to Ahmad Sedik on the wing who went through on goal and assisted again for Osama Hosny for the late winner and holding high the Egyptian Cup. After that, Al Ahly won the Egyptian Super Cup 2007 for the third successive time, through shoot-outs, after tying 1–1 with Ismaily.

In 2007 CAF Champions League, Aboutrika scored 4 goals for Al Ahly until now, to raise his African goals to the number 15. Al Ahly faced Étoile Sportive du Sahel of Tunisia in the final match. Al Ahly was having the chance to be the first team in the World to reach FIFA Club World Cup three successive times, and the first team in Africa to win CAF Champions League three successive times. However, the two legs ended, seeing Étoile Sportive du Sahel of Tunisia lifting the cup.

He won the title Best Player in Egypt for 2007 the fourth successive time after 2004, 2005, 2006 and 2007 setting a new Egyptian record.

=== 2008 ===
African Cup of Nations 2008 In 2008, Aboutrika scored 4 goals for Egypt in the 2008 Africa Cup of Nations. He scored the winning goal against Cameroon in the final match, helping Egypt to win the African Cup of Nations for the second consecutive tournament. Aboutrika also scored a goal in the semi-final against the Ivory Coast, and scored twice against Sudan in Egypt's group stage match.

Aboutrika scored a goal in the final match. In the previous tournament in 2006, he scored the latest decisive penalty shoot-out in the final match against the Ivory Coast to give Egypt the cup. With his team Al Ahly of Egypt, Aboutrika was the hero of final matches again, through scoring a goal in the final match of both the 2006 and the 2005 CAF Champions League helping his team lift the continental cup.

=== CAF Champions League 2008 ===
Aboutrika rehealed from injury in August, after missing the group stage start of 2008 CAF Champions League with his team Al Ahly. He marked his first participation in the group stage, scoring the winning goal for Al Ahly in the 93rd minute against Dynamos F.C. of Zimbabwe in an 8-round game that ended 2–1 for the Egyptian side. On 30 August, he helped Al Ahly to grab the 3 points from Zimbabwe, after making the winning goal, scored by his favourite teammate Mohamed Barakat; Al Ahly achieved a 1–0 win. On 14 September, Aboutrika scored the second goal for Al Ahly against their rivals, Zamalek SC of Egypt, in a group game that ended 2–2.

Aboutrika scored again in the final group match against ASEC Mimosas, a game ended 2–2 as Aboutrika netted the first goal for Al Ahly. A draw sealed first place in Group A for Al Ahly with 12 points from six matches, while Dynamos of Zimbabwe joined them in the semi-finals of the 3.5-million-dollar competition.

Aboutrika was crowned the 2008 BBC African Footballer of the Year. He won after taking more than half of the total ballot.

=== 2008 African Footballer of the Year nomination ===
Mohamed Aboutrika (Al Ahly, Egypt), Emmanuel Adebayor (Arsenal, Togo), Amr Zaki (Wigan Athletic, Egypt), Didier Drogba (Chelsea F.C., Ivory Coast) and Michael Essien (Chelsea F.C., Ghana) make up the shortlist for the Glo-CAF African Footballer of the Year across the world.

The Confederation of African Football (CAF) on Wednesday in Lagos, Nigeria, announced the final shortlist of categories for the Glo-CAF Awards 2008. The final three for the title was decided following votes from the head coaches of the 53 national associations affiliated to CAF.

For the top honor, the CAF Player of the Year award, the nominees were Emmanuel Adebayor (Arsenal and Togo), Michael Essien (Chelsea and Ghana), and Mohamed Aboutrika (Al Ahly and Egypt).

The shortlist for the Glo-CAF Best Player on the Continent are Mohamed Aboutrika (Al Ahly, Egypt), Ahmed Hassan (Al Ahly, Egypt), Flavio Amado (Al Ahly, Angola).

The winner of the two categories will be announced at the awards gala on 10 February, in Lagos, Nigeria.

FIFA World Cup 2010 Qualifiers

On 7 June, Aboutrika scored in Egypt's world cup qualifier against Algeria in Algeria, but Egypt lost 3–1.

On 4 July, Aboutrika played in Egypt's world cup qualifier against Rwanda in Egypt, helping the Egyptians win 3–0, and scored the first and the third goal, making the Egyptian team second after Algeria, in their group. Aboutrika reached his fifth goal in FIFA World Cup 2010 Qualifiers.

=== 2012 ===
Port Said Stadium disaster After the Port Said Stadium disaster, on 1 February 2012, Aboutrika decided to retire from professional football, along with Emad Motaeb and Mohamed Barakat, then he decided to get back to football. Around a week later, the Egyptian Premier League had been cancelled. Aboutrika had finished the uncompleted campaign with 4 goals in 14 games.

CAF Champions League Aboutrika helped Al Ahly won their seventh CAF Champions League title after scoring 6 goals. His most impressive match was on 14 May 2012. Ahly were down 1–0 at home to Stade Malien in a second leg CAF Champions League match and were down 2–0 on aggregate. Aboutrika was subbed on in the 42nd minute for Mohamed Shawky and in the second half, he scored his first ever CAF Champions League hat-trick, 2 of which were scored in the last 8 minutes of the match. He scored the first from a wonderfully curled free-kick from 28 yards out. He then scored the second from the penalty spot in the 82nd minute. Finally, he blasted the third from into the top right corner from 12 yards out to get the hat-trick, complete the comeback, and secure Al Ahly a place in the 2012 CAF Champions League group stage. On 22 July 2012, he scored against Zamalek to win 1–0 in the group stage match.

London 2012 Aboutrika was one of the three overage players participated with Egypt in London 2012, and was the team's captain. Aboutrika scored Egypt's first goal in the tournament against Brazil in a 3–2 loss. In the second game, Aboutrika's assist for Mohamed Salah picked a 1–1 draw against New Zealand. In the third game against Belarus, Aboutrika assisted a goal for Mohamed Salah and scored another to help Egypt win 3–1 and claim a quarter-final berth.

Club World Cup Aboutrika scored the winner goal for Al Ahly in a 2–1 victory over Japanese side Sanfrecce Hiroshima. A goal secured his team a place in the quarter-finals. Al Ahly came fourth in the tournament. Aboutrika became the joint all-time top scorer in the FIFA Club World Cup with 4 goals, alongside Lionel Messi and Denilson.

Africa Based Player of the Year Aboutrika was crowned African player of the Year Based in Africa. The 34-year-old secured his third title after winning the same award in 2008 and 2006.

=== 2013 ===
In the first half of the year, Aboutrika agreed to join Baniyas SC for loan. He helped the Emirati team to win Gulf Champions League, scoring in the semi-final and final matches. He also scored in his debut match with the team.

Aboutrika returned to Al Ahly to help Al Ahly retain his continental title. In his first match after return, he scored against Zamalek SC in the 2013 CAF Champions League group stage. The game ended 1–1 and this was Aboutrika's 12th goal in Cairo Derby, a personal record. On 15 September, Aboutrika scored his 13th goal in Cairo Derby. With this goal, he became the top goalscorer in all Cairo Derby matches, alongside Al Ahly Legend Mahmoud Mokhtar El-Tetsh. Al Ahly won 4–2 to advance to the semi-finals of the 2013 CAF Champions League. In the semi-final first leg held on 6 October at Cameroon, Aboutrika grabbed the equaliser against Coton Sport FC de Garoua in the first leg, which ended 1–1; in the final match first leg in Orlando Stadium Aboutrika scored Al Ahly's goal in a 1–1 draw against Orlando Pirates of South Africa on 2 November, and in the second leg held in Cairo on 10 November, Aboutrika opened the scoring for Al Ahly as they went on to win 2–0, retaining the title. That was Aboutrika's 32nd goal for Al Ahly in African Competitions. He is the second all-time top scorer after Al Ahly legend Mahmoud El Khatib who scored 37 goals. Aboutrika provided 21 assists in continental matches too in addition to his 32 goals.

Individually, Aboutrika was named in July by Goal.com in the Goal 50 list for (2012/2013) season. He took the 29th spot. He is the first Africa-based player to appear in the Goal 50 for a second time, after being named in 45th spot in 2009.

At the international level, on 26 March, Aboutrika grabbed a last minute goal for Egypt national football team against Zimbabwe national football team in a World Cup Qualifier helping hosts to win 2–1. On 9 June, he started the scoresheet in Harare and Egypt won 4–2, and made two assists for his teammate Mohamed Salah. On 10 September, Aboutrika played his 100th historic cap with Egypt national football team against Guinea national football team in a World Cup Qualifier. He scored a goal and assisted two goals for Mohamed Salah and Amr Zaki. Egypt won 4–2 and set to advance to a two-leg play-off during October and November against Ghana, with the winners qualifying for Brazil 2014. Aboutrika is the second joint top scorer of the CAF second round qualifiers with 5 goals in 6 qualifiers, and 9 assists. After scoring in the play-off against Ghana, he became the all-time top scorer of Egypt in the World Cup Qualifiers with 14 goals.

=== 2013 African Footballer of the Year nomination ===
On 5 December 2013, the Confederation of African Football's (CAF) announced its reduced shortlist of ten nominees for the 2013 Player of the Year award. Aboutrika was one of the final ten nominees. The head coaches of the national football associations affiliated to CAF voted to decide the eventual winner of the award. The winner, Yaya Touré, was announced at the Glo-CAF Awards Gala on 9 January in Lagos, Nigeria.

=== Retirement ===
He announced his retirement via Twitter on 20 December 2013, after Egypt failed to qualify for the 2014 FIFA World Cup in Brazil.

== International career ==
=== Summary ===
As of 19 November 2013, Aboutrika scored 38 goals in 100 matches for Egypt. He debuted against Estonia on 19 March 2001, but had to wait for 3 years to receive another call-up. His second call-up witnessed his first international goal against Trinidad and Tobago on 31 March 2004. He became an essential player since then, and scored 5 goals in his first 6 appearances with Egypt in 2004 and 2005. Aboutrika helped Egypt win two consecutive African Cup of Nations in 2006 and 2008 scoring the decisive penalty kick in the 2006 final match, and the only winning goal in the 2008 final. Also, he is the all-time top scorer of Egypt in the World Cup Qualifiers with 14 goals.

=== 2006 FIFA World Cup Qualification ===
Aboutrika was an essential member of the Egyptian team at the 2006 FIFA World Cup qualifier. He scored 3 goals in the first 3 matches of the qualifiers. The first goal was against Sudan on 6 June 2004 in a 3–0 victory in Khartoum Stadium. The second goal came on 20 June 2004, in Alexandria Stadium, in a loss 2–1 against the Ivory Coast. The third goal was in Benin on 4 July 2004 helped Egypt to get a tie 3–3 from hosts in Stade de l'Amitié.

=== 2006 African Cup of Nations ===
Aboutrika proved to be his international team's trump card en route to victory in the 2006 Africa Cup of Nations in February, when he scored two important goals against Libya and Ivory Coast. He assisted the winning goal in the semi-final match against Senegal when Amr Zaki scored in the 80th minute. He was very dominant in that game, but his accurate shot hit the bar. In the final match, Aboutrika scored the decisive penalty in the shoot-out which gave Egypt the title.

=== 2008 African Cup of Nations ===
Aboutrika was part of the Egyptian team which defended their title in 2008 Africa Cup of Nations in Ghana. Aboutrika scored 4 goals for Egypt. The most important goal was the winning goal against Cameroon in the final match, helping Egypt to win the African Cup of Nations for the second consecutive tournament. Aboutrika also scored a goal in the semi-final against the Ivory Coast, and scored twice against Sudan in Egypt's group stage match.

=== 2009 FIFA Confederations Cup ===
Aboutrika was a member in Egypt football national team line-up in 2009 FIFA Confederations Cup. Egypt were drawn in Group B along with Brazil, Italy and USA.

Egypt started with Brazil on 15 June, a game ended 4–3 for the Brazilian side. Aboutrika assisted Egypt's two goals, to his teammate Mohamed Zidan who scored twice.

The Italian sports journalist Gabriele Marcotti has also been highly impressed with Aboutrika's performance against Brazil, and praised Aboutrika's career with football in general.

He is possibly the greatest footballer in the history of the world with a bachelor's diploma in philosophy hanging on the wall of his sitting room. He is arguably the best footballer on Earth not playing his trade in Europe or South America. and Does staying in Egypt make him gutless and unambitious because he won't measure himself against the world's best on a regular basis? Or, in fact, should he be admired for remaining loyal to his homeland, simply being happy with what he has achieved and not feeling the need to chase the glamour and millions of the Premier League or La Liga?.

Egypt faced Italy on 18 June, a game ended with a victory 1–0 for Egypt. Aboutrika assisted Egypt's goal, to his teammate Mohamed Soliman "Homos" who scored with a header.

=== 2010 FIFA World Cup Qualification ===
After the friendly match against Argentina, Aboutrika had an injury which deprived him of being a member along the national team in the first 4 matches played in June, in FIFA World Cup 2010 Qualifiers. He marked his national return against Congo DR in Kinshasa on 7 September 2008 scoring the winning goal for Egypt, to secure the Pharaohs' place in the second round of Qualifications. He scored another goal in his second match in the qualifiers against Djibouti.

On 7 June 2009, Aboutrika scored in Egypt's world cup qualifier against Algeria in Algeria, but Egypt lost 3–1. On 4 July 2009, Aboutrika played in Egypt's world cup qualifier against Rwanda in Egypt, helping the Egyptians win 3–0, and scored the first and the third goal, making the Egyptian team second after Algeria, in their group. Aboutrika reached his fifth goal in FIFA World Cup 2010 Qualifiers.

=== 2012 Summer Olympics ===
Aboutrika was one of the three overage players who participated with Egypt in London 2012, and was the team's captain. Aboutrika scored Egypt's first goal in the tournament against Brazil in a loss 3–2. In the second game, Aboutrika's assist for Mohamed Salah picked a 1–1 draw against New Zealand. In the third game against Belarus, Aboutrika assisted a goal for Mohamed Salah and scored another to help Egypt win 3–1 and claim a quarter-final berth.

=== 2014 FIFA World Cup Qualification ===
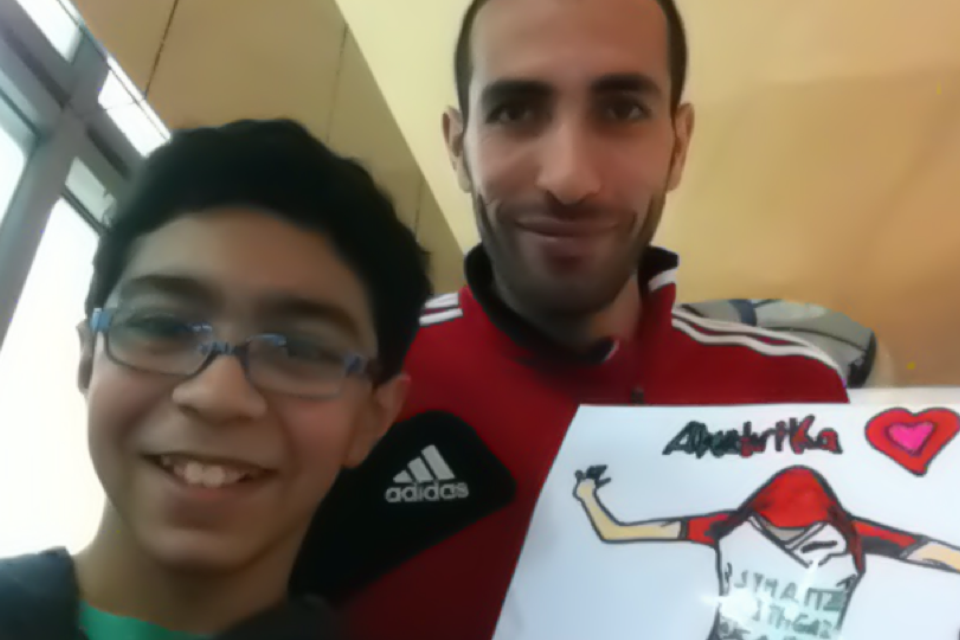
Aboutrika with a fan after an international friendly match in preparation for the 2014 World Cup qualifiers.

In the 2014 FIFA World Cup qualifiers, Aboutrika was the second joint top scorer of the Second round qualifiers with 5 goals and 9 assists in 6 qualifiers. The first two goals came on Stade du 28 Septembre, helping Egypt to get a win 3–2 over Guinea. On 26 March 2013, Aboutrika grabbed his third goal, a last minute penalty kick for Egypt against Zimbabwe helping the hosts to win 2–1. On 9 June, he started the scoresheet in Harare and Egypt won 4–2, and made two assists for his teammate Mohamed Salah. On 10 September 2013, Aboutrika played his 100th historic cap with Egypt national football team against Guinea in a World Cup Qualifier. He scored a goal and assisted two goals for Mohamed Salah and Amr Zaki. Egypt won 4–2.

Egypt set to advance to a two-leg play-off during October and November against Ghana, with the winners qualifying for Brazil 2014. Aboutrika scored Egypt's only goal in Kumasi, but Egypt got a shocking 6–1 loss. Yet, Aboutrika became the joint top scorer of the 2014 FIFA World Cup qualification (CAF) with 6 goals. In addition to 3 goals in 2006 qualifiers, and 5 goals in 2010 qualifiers, Aboutrika became the all-time top scorer of Egypt in the World Cup Qualifiers with 14 goals.

== Personal life ==
Aboutrika is a graduate of Cairo University with a Bachelor of Arts degree in philosophy. He is married and has five children. One of them, Ahmed, is a professional footballer.

Bob Bradley, the American coach of Egypt national football team said in March 2013 about Aboutrika, "Everywhere we went people would say, 'You must pick Aboutrika'. He's incredibly popular and the people love him. He's respected not just as a player but as a man. He did all of the right things to keep himself at a high level. He is without a doubt a leader for us, and he brings experience and intelligence in a way that can make a very big difference".

=== Humanitarian role ===
As his soccer star status grew in Africa, he turned his sights to humanitarian issues. Aboutrika said:

"Every athlete has a humanitarian role in society. He doesn't live solely for himself, but for others, too. I like to participate in charity work and try my best to help the poor and penniless. I'm also seeking to use soccer in humanitarian work."

With that ideal, Aboutrika joined UNDP Goodwill Ambassadors the Brazilian player Ronaldo and French player Zinedine Zidane, in addition to 40 international soccer stars in 2005 for a "Match Against Poverty" in Germany to raise funds and awareness about the issue worldwide. He scored in that match.

One of Aboutrika's soccer role models is Egyptian player Mahmoud El Khatib. Off the pitch, Aboutrika follows the example of the Prophet Mohammed.

He volunteered to appear in a WFP 30-second Public Service Announcement (PSA) in which he mentioned that 25,000 people die from hunger every day, 18,000 of them children.

In October 2013, Aboutrika commissioned his own-sponsored mosque in Ghana when the Egyptian team arrived for a crucial 2014 World Cup playoff. The Al Ahly ace is reported to have used his funds to build a mosque to serve the people of Tafo in the Ashanti Region.

=== Sympathy with Gaza ===
After scoring a goal in Egypt's 3–0 over Sudan in the 2008 African Cup of Nations Aboutrika removed his jersey to show a T-shirt reading "Sympathize with Gaza". He was protesting Israel's 10-day blockade of Gaza. He was given a yellow card for breaking FIFA's rule against displaying political slogans during play and faced further sanctions, but CAF handed down no punishments.

=== Supporting Ultras Ahlawy ===
Breaking with the tradition of football players standing on the sidelines of popular revolts in the Middle East and North Africa, if not supporting autocratic leaders, Aboutrika announced late that he would not be joining his fellow Al Ahly players on 9 September 2012 in Egypt Super Cup final against ENPPI, Egypt's first domestic match since this month's lifting of a seven-month ban on professional football .

In doing so, Aboutrika, one of Egypt's most popular players, sided with Ultras Ahlawy, the club's highly politicized support group. The group opposes the resumption of soccer as long as justice has not come for the 74 Al Ahly supporters killed in February Egypt's worst sporting incident in a politically loaded brawl in Port Said, where fans are not allowed to attend matches.

The brawl, which is widely believed to have been provoked by security forces to punish the ultras for their key role in the ousting of president Hosni Mubarak and violent opposition to the military that ruled Egypt until the election of President Mohammed Morsi in the country's first democratic poll, sparked the banning of football for most of this year.

=== Subsequent controversy ===
Aboutrika's assets were frozen in the spring of 2015 because of his shares in the Asshab Tours Company, whose manager was allegedly a Muslim Brotherhood member. Aboutrika denied any involvement in the Muslim Brotherhood, saying the company's co-owner who was so accused had left the previous year. Aboutrika's two appeals were rejected, but then the administrative court overturned the verdict in June 2016. (Discourses of Public Behavior in Egypt / Sherifa Zuhur / Paper prepared for the Association of Middle Eastern and African Studies, September 2016.

On 17 January 2017, Egypt added him to a terrorism list for alleged ties to the outlawed Muslim Brotherhood, his lawyer told Reuters. On 18 May 2024, the Egyptian Court of Cassation annulled the registration of Mohamed Aboutrika and more than 1,500 people on terrorist lists established because of their alleged links with the Muslim Brotherhood.

=== Homophobia controversy ===
On 29 November 2021, Aboutrika, in response to a question about the U.K. Premier League's Rainbow Laces Campaign on the Qatari channel beIN Sports, made a number of statements critical of the campaign and of gay rights.

== Career statistics ==
=== Club ===
Appearances and goals by club, season and competition
Club	Season	League			National cup (Note: Includes appearances in the Egypt Cup, UAE President's Cup)		Continental (Note: Includes appearances in the CAF Champions League)		Other (Note: Includes appearances in the Championship Playoff, GCC Champions League, Egyptian Super Cup, CAF Super Cup and FIFA Club World Cup)		Total	
Club	Season	Division	Apps	Goals	Apps	Goals	Apps	Goals	Apps	Goals	Apps	Goals
Tersana	1996–97	Egyptian Second Division	0	0	0	0	—		—		0	0
Tersana	1997–98	Egyptian Second Division	23	11	4	0	—		—		27	11
Tersana	1998–99	Egyptian Second Division	27	19	5	0	—		—		32	19
Tersana	1999–00	Egyptian Second Division	29	34	4	0	—		—		33	34
Tersana	Total		79	64	13	0	0	0	0	0	92	64
Tersana	2000–01	Egyptian Premier League	24	6	1	0	—		—		25	6
Tersana	2001–02	Egyptian Premier League	21	7	5	2	—		—		26	9
Tersana	2002–03	Egyptian Premier League	19	11	2	0	—		—		21	11
Tersana	2003–04	Egyptian Premier League	8	3	0	0	—		—		8	3
Tersana	Total		72	27	8	2	0	0	0	0	80	29
Al Ahly	2003–04	Egyptian Premier League	15	10	1	2	0	0	0	0	16	12
Al Ahly	2004–05	Egyptian Premier League	26	9	0	0	13	3	0	0	39	12
Al Ahly	2005–06	Egyptian Premier League	21	18	4	0	11	8	4	0	40	26
Al Ahly	2006–07	Egyptian Premier League	15	7	4	4	11	4	4	4	34	19
Al Ahly	2007–08	Egyptian Premier League	19	5	0	0	10	3	1	0	30	8
Al Ahly	2008–09	Egyptian Premier League	22	10	1	0	4	0	3	0	30	10
Al Ahly	2009–10	Egyptian Premier League	15	6	5	2	11	1	1	0	32	9
Al Ahly	2010–11	Egyptian Premier League	17	8	2	0	8	1	1	1	28	10
Al Ahly	2011–12	Egyptian Premier League	13	4	0	0	10	6	0	0	23	10
Al Ahly	2012–13	Egyptian Premier League	0	0	0	0	10	5	3	1	13	6
Al Ahly	2013–14	Egyptian Premier League	0	0	0	0	0	0	1	0	1	0
Al Ahly	Total		163	77	17	8	88	31	18	6	286	122
Baniyas (loan)	2012–13	UAE Pro League	6	2	1	1	0	0	5	2	12	5
Career total			334	170	26	11	88	31	23	8	471	220

=== International ===
Appearances and goals by national team and year
National team	Year	Apps	Goals
Egypt	2001	1	0
Egypt	2002	0	0
Egypt	2003	0	0
Egypt	2004	9	5
Egypt	2005	14	2
Egypt	2006	11	3
Egypt	2007	6	0
Egypt	2008	12	8
Egypt	2009	13	6
Egypt	2010	6	1
Egypt	2011	6	1
Egypt	2012	13	7
Egypt	2013	9	5
Total		100	38

Scores and results list Egypt's goal tally first, score column indicates score after each Aboutrika goal.

List of international goals scored by Mohamed Aboutrika
No.	Date	Venue	Opponent	Score	Result	Competition
1	31 March 2004	Osman Ahmed Osman Stadium, Cairo, Egypt	Trinidad and Tobago	1–0	2–1	Friendly
2	24 May 2004	Cairo Military Academy Stadium, Cairo, Egypt	Zimbabwe	2–0	2–0	Friendly
3	6 June 2004	Khartoum Stadium, Khartoum, Sudan	Sudan	2–0	3–0	2006 FIFA World Cup qualification
4	20 June 2004	Alexandria Stadium, Alexandria, Egypt	Ivory Coast	1–1	1–2	2006 FIFA World Cup qualification
5	4 July 2004	Stade de l'Amitié, Cotonou, Benin	Benin	2–3	3–3	2006 FIFA World Cup qualification
6	29 July 2005	Stade de Genève, Geneva, Switzerland	Qatar	1–0	5–0	Friendly
7	29 July 2005	Stade de Genève, Geneva, Switzerland	Qatar	4–0	5–0	Friendly
8	20 January 2006	Cairo International Stadium, Cairo, Egypt	Libya	2–0	3–0	2006 Africa Cup of Nations
9	28 January 2006	Cairo International Stadium, Cairo, Egypt	Ivory Coast	2–1	3–1	2006 Africa Cup of Nations
10	2 September 2006	Cairo International Stadium, Cairo, Egypt	Burundi	3–0	4–1	2008 Africa Cup of Nations qualification
11	26 January 2008	Baba Yara Stadium, Kumasi, Ghana	Sudan	2–0	3–0	2008 Africa Cup of Nations
12	26 January 2008	Baba Yara Stadium, Kumasi, Ghana	Sudan	3–0	3–0	2008 Africa Cup of Nations
13	7 February 2008	Baba Yara Stadium, Kumasi, Ghana	Ivory Coast	4–1	4–1	2008 Africa Cup of Nations
14	10 February 2008	Accra Sports Stadium, Accra, Ghana	Cameroon	1–0	1–0	2008 Africa Cup of Nations Final
15	7 September 2008	Stade des Martyrs, Kinshasa, DR Congo	DR Congo	1–0	1–0	2010 FIFA World Cup qualification
16	12 October 2008	Cairo Military Academy Stadium, Cairo, Egypt	Djibouti	3–0	4–0	2010 FIFA World Cup qualification
17	19 November 2008	Cairo International Stadium, Cairo, Egypt	Benin	4–0	5–1	Friendly
18	19 November 2008	Cairo International Stadium, Cairo, Egypt	Benin	5–0	5–1	Friendly
19	30 May 2009	Sultan Qaboos Sports Complex, Muscat, Oman	Oman	1–0	1–0	Friendly
20	7 June 2009	Mustapha Tchaker Stadium, Blida, Algeria	Algeria	1–3	1–3	2010 FIFA World Cup qualification
21	5 July 2009	Cairo Military Academy Stadium, Cairo, Egypt	Rwanda	1–0	3–0	2010 FIFA World Cup qualification
22	5 July 2009	Cairo Military Academy Stadium, Cairo, Egypt	Rwanda	3–0	3–0	2010 FIFA World Cup qualification
23	2 October 2009	Petro Sport Stadium, Cairo, Egypt	Mauritius	1–0	4–0	Friendly
24	2 October 2009	Petro Sport Stadium, Cairo, Egypt	Mauritius	3–0	4–0	Friendly
25	11 August 2010	Cairo International Stadium, Cairo, Egypt	DR Congo	3–2	6–3	Friendly
26	5 January 2011	Osman Ahmed Osman Stadium, Cairo, Egypt	Tanzania	2–0	5–1	2011 Nile Basin Tournament
27	29 March 2012	Khartoum Stadium, Khartoum, Sudan	Uganda	2–0	2–1	Friendly
28	12 April 2012	Al Maktoum Stadium, Dubai, United Arab Emirates	Nigeria	2–1	3–2	Friendly
29	20 May 2012	Al Merreikh Stadium, Omdurman, Sudan	Cameroon	2–1	2–1	Friendly
30	10 June 2012	Stade du 28 Septembre, Conakry, Guinea	Guinea	1–1	3–2	2014 FIFA World Cup qualification
31	10 June 2012	Stade du 28 Septembre, Conakry, Guinea	Guinea	2–1	3–2	2014 FIFA World Cup qualification
32	12 October 2012	Khalid Bin Mohammed Stadium, Sharjah, United Arab Emirates	Congo	1–0	3–0	Friendly
33	12 October 2012	Khalid Bin Mohammed Stadium, Sharjah, United Arab Emirates	Congo	3–0	3–0	Friendly
34	14 January 2013	Zayed Sports City Stadium, Abu Dhabi, United Arab Emirates	Ivory Coast	1–0	2–4	Friendly
35	26 March 2013	Borg El Arab Stadium, Cairo, Egypt	Zimbabwe	2–1	2–1	2014 FIFA World Cup qualification
36	9 June 2013	National Sports Stadium, Harare, Zimbabwe	Zimbabwe	1–0	4–2	2014 FIFA World Cup qualification
37	10 September 2013	El Gouna Stadium, Hurghada, Egypt	Guinea	2–1	4–2	2014 FIFA World Cup qualification
38	15 October 2013	Baba Yara Stadium, Kumasi, Ghana	Ghana	1–2	1–6	2014 FIFA World Cup qualification

== Honours and achievements ==
Al Ahly

- Egyptian Premier League: 2004–05, 2005–06, 2006–07, 2007–08, 2008–09, 2009–10, 2010–11
- Egypt Cup: 2006, 2007
- Egyptian Super Cup: 2005, 2006, 2007, 2008, 2010, 2012
- CAF Champions League: 2005, 2006, 2008, 2012, 2013
- CAF Super Cup: 2006, 2007, 2009, 2013
- FIFA Club World Cup third place: 2006

Baniyas

- GCC Champions League: 2012–13

Egypt

- African Cup of Nations: 2006, 2008
- Nile Basin Tournament: 2011

Individual

- EFA Egyptian Player of the Year: 2004, 2005, 2006, 2007, 2008
- African Inter-Club Player of the Year: 2006, 2008, 2012, 2013
- CAF Team of the Year: 2006, 2008, 2012, 2013
- Africa Cup of Nations Dream Team: 2006, 2008
- World's Most Popular Footballer: 2007, 2008
- El Heddaf Arab Footballer of the Year: 2007, 2008, 2012
- Al Mountakhab Arab Footballer of the Year: 2008
- BBC African Footballer of the Year: 2008
- 2008 Africa Cup of Nations Final: Man of the Match
- FIFA Confederations Cup Dream Team: 2009
- Goal 50: 2009, 2013
- IFFHS Legends: 2016

Orders

- Grand Cordon of Order of the Republic

Performances

- Egyptian Second Division top goalscorer: 1999–00
- Egyptian Premier League top goalscorer: 2005–06
- CAF Champions League top goalscorer: 2006
- FIFA Club World Cup top goalscorer: 2006
- Egypt Cup top goalscorer: 2007
- FIFA Confederations Cup top assist provider: 2009 (Shared with Elano, Maicon and Joan Capdevila)
- FIFA World Cup qualification top goalscorer: 2014 (Shared with Mohamed Salah and Asamoah Gyan)

Records

- African Inter-Club Player of the Year (Based in Africa): 2006, 2008, 2012, 2013

== See also ==
- List of men's footballers with 100 or more international caps
