= 30 June Stadium stampede =

2015 stadium stampede in Cairo, Egypt

Coordinates: 30°01′12″N 31°22′25″E

- Date: 8 February 2015
- Location: 30 June Stadium, Cairo, Egypt
- Methods: Tear gas, stampede

Casualties
- Deaths: 28

The 30 June Stadium stampede, which occurred in Egypt on 8 February 2015, resulted in the deaths of 28 football fans in a confrontation with the police. The stampede took place at the gates of 30 June Stadium during a league match between two Cairo clubs, Zamalek and ENPPI.

Most of the dead were crushed to death and suffocated when the crowd stampeded after police used tear gas to clear the fans trying to force their way into the stadium. Egypt's ultras are notorious for leading the 2011 Egyptian revolution and had many problems with the police, with chants and banners, insulting the police, displayed at matches.

== Buildup and event ==
The fixture came after the long-awaited lift of the ban on supporters in stadiums after the Port Said Massacre in 2012. The Chair of Zamalek's executive board, Mortada Mansour, issued a press release stating that fans would be allowed to attend the game for free as a "gift to the fans of Zamalek." This created significant confusion, as many fans believed they only needed to show up at the stadium to enter. In one interview with Sada al-Balad, Mansour claimed that 5,000 tickets were distributed to fans for free, while the other 5,000 were sold to club members. In a different interview with ONtv Live, he claimed that 5,000 tickets were "free invitations" distributed to fans, including the Ultras White Knights (UWK), and 5,000 were for sale. Later, on Al Hayah TV, he claimed that 10,000 tickets were printed but only 6,000–7,000 were actually sold or distributed.

On February 7, 2015, the day before the match, a narrow, 15-meter-long corridor made of iron bars and topped with barbed wire was constructed at the stadium entrance. The UWK later labeled this the "Death Cage" (or "The Corridor of Death"), arguing that it was unprecedented and designed to bottleneck the crowd.

On February 8, 2015, between 3:00 PM and 5:30 PM, thousands of fans arrived at the stadium. Because of Mansour's "free ticket" announcement, many fans showed up without physical tickets, believing they would be granted entry upon arrival. At the same time, those who did have tickets were forced into the narrow iron corridor, which could only accommodate a few people at a time.

Around 6:00 PM, the crowd size swelled to roughly 5,000–10,000 people. As the bottleneck in the metal corridor became unbearable, the crowd began to press forward, with some saying this was due to the cage collapsing and others saying this was due to inadequate crowd control. According to eyewitnesses and forensic reports, security forces then fired tear gas directly into the packed iron corridor. Panic ensued, and fans were unable to escape the gas because of the iron bars. Most of the 20 to 28 victims (numbers vary by source) died of asphyxiation due to the stampede and the gas, rather than birdshot or live ammunition.

The match was allowed to proceed and began at 7:30 PM, even as bodies were being moved outside. Only one player, Omar Gaber, refused to play after learning of the deaths; he was subsequently suspended by his club.

== Reactions ==
=== Domestic ===
- The Cabinet of Egypt decided to stop the league for an indefinite period.
- Mortada Mansour appeared on several TV channels (including Sada al-Balad and ONtv). He shifted his story, claiming that, while he had provided some free invitations, the Ultras had "thugged" their way in and orchestrated the violence to sabotage the state.
- In May 2015, Egypt banned ultra groups and designated them as terrorist groups.
- In 2017, 14 people were sentenced to jail, and the Muslim Brotherhood was officially blamed for planning and financing the violence.

=== International ===
- FIFA president Sepp Blatter sent a letter to Mohamed Gamal, the President of the Egyptian Football Association, in which he expressed his sorrow over the events before the game.

=== Ultras ===
The reaction from the Ultras White Knights was one of immediate and profound betrayal. They framed the event, not as an accidental stampede, but as a "premeditated massacre." The UWK official Facebook page released statements accusing Mortada Mansour and the Ministry of Interior of a "conspiracy." They argued that the "free ticket" announcement was a deliberate lure to attract a massive crowd to a stadium with a single, caged entrance (the "Death Cage") to facilitate a crackdown.

In the following days, the group adopted the slogan "We will never forget, we will never forgive." They held several funeral processions that turned into anti-government and anti-Mansour protests, often chanting, "oh Mortada, you coward, the blood of the fans is on your hands."

UWK also proceeded to release a song called "صرخة العشرين", (Sarkhet El 3esrheen), which translates to "The Roar of the Twenty". The song pays tribute to the 20 victims and tells the story of the event. It paints the victims as martyrs dying for freedom and the cause that the ultras stand for.

Ultras White Knights and Ultras Ahlawi now hold flashlights at the 20th minute of the match, just as they do at the 74th minute for the victims of the Port Said Riots.

Another memorial track released by the Ultras White Knights is "إفتح بنموت", (Efta7 Benmoot), which translates to "Open Up, We are Dying".

Ultras White Knights also carry a flag bearing the number 20, in tribute to the victims. It is consistently carried to every match that they attend and is one of the only flags that are unconditionally brought to matches.

== See also ==
- Port Said Stadium riot
- Zamalek disaster
