= 2009 FIFA Confederations Cup statistics =

These are the statistics for the 2009 FIFA Confederations Cup, an eight-team tournament running from 14 June 2009 through 28 June 2009. The tournament took place in South Africa.

== Goalscorers ==
5 goals

- (Brazil) Luís Fabiano

3 goals

- (Spain) Fernando Torres
- (Spain) David Villa
- (United States) Clint Dempsey

2 goals

- (Brazil) Kaká
- (Egypt) Mohamed Zidan
- (South Africa) Katlego Mphela
- (South Africa) Bernard Parker
- (Italy) Giuseppe Rossi
- (Spain) Dani Güiza
- (United States) Landon Donovan

1 goal

- (Brazil) Dani Alves
- (Brazil) Felipe Melo
- (Brazil) Juan
- (Brazil) Lúcio
- (Brazil) Maicon
- (Brazil) Robinho
- (Egypt) Homos
- (Egypt) Mohamed Shawky
- (Italy) Daniele De Rossi
- (Spain) Xabi Alonso
- (Spain) Cesc Fàbregas
- (Spain) Fernando Llorente
- (United States) Jozy Altidore
- (United States) Michael Bradley
- (United States) Charlie Davies

Own goal

- (Italy) Andrea Dossena (for Brazil)

Source: FIFA

== Assists ==
3 assists

- (Brazil) Elano
- (Brazil) Maicon
- (Egypt) Mohamed Aboutrika
- (Spain) Joan Capdevila

2 assists

- (Brazil) Kaká
- (South Africa) Tsepo Masilela
- (Spain) Cesc Fàbregas
- (United States) Jonathan Spector

1 assist

Twelve players

Source: FIFA

== Scoring ==
- Total number of goals scored: 44
- Average goals per match: 2.75
- Total number of hat-tricks: 1 – Fernando Torres for Spain against New Zealand
- Most goals scored by a team: 14 – Brazil
- Most goals scored by an individual: 5 – Luís Fabiano
- Most assists provided by an individual: 3 – Elano, Maicon, Mohamed Aboutrika, Joan Capdevila
- Most goals and assists produced by an individual: 5 goals and 0 assists – Luís Fabiano
- Fewest goals scored by a team: 0 – Iraq, New Zealand
- Most goals conceded by a team: 9 – United States
- Fewest goals conceded by a team: 1 – Iraq
- Best goal difference: +9 – Brazil
- Worst goal difference: −7 – New Zealand
- Most goals scored in a match by both teams: 7 – Brazil (4) and Egypt (3)
- Most goals scored in a match by one team: 5 – Spain against New Zealand
- Most goals scored in a match by the losing team: 3 – Egypt against Brazil (4)
- Biggest margin of victory: 5 goals – Spain against New Zealand
- Most clean sheets achieved by a team: 3 – Brazil, Spain
- Fewest clean sheets achieved by a team: 0 – Italy
- Most clean sheets given by an opposing team: 3 – Iraq, New Zealand, South Africa
- Fewest clean sheets given by an opposing team: 0 – Brazil
- Most consecutive clean sheets achieved by a team: 3 – Brazil, Spain
- Most consecutive clean sheets given by an opposing team: 3 – Iraq, New Zealand
- First goal of the tournament: Fernando Torres for Spain against New Zealand
- First hat-trick of the tournament: Fernando Torres for Spain against New Zealand
- Fastest goal in a match from kickoff: 5th minute – Kaká for Brazil against Egypt
- Latest goal in a match without extra time: 90+3rd minute – Katlego Mphela for South Africa against Spain
- Latest winning goal in a match without extra time: 88th minute – Dani Alves for Brazil against South Africa
- Most goals scored by one player in a match: 3 – Fernando Torres for Spain against New Zealand
- Oldest goal scorer: 31 years 1 month and 20 days old – Lúcio for Brazil against United States
- Youngest goal scorer: 19 years 7 months and 18 days old – Jozy Altidore for United States against Spain
