= Port Said Stadium riot =

February 2012 football stadium riot in Port Said, Egypt

- Date: 1 February 2012
- Location: Port Said Stadium, Port Said, Egypt; 31°16′16″N 32°17′30″E
- Caused by: Football hooliganism; Counter-revolution by remnants of the Mubarak regime and the Supreme Council of the Armed Forces (alleged)
- Methods: Rioting, stoning, stabbing
- Result: Further unrest continues in Cairo, Alexandria, and Suez until 11 February.; Cancelation of the 2012-13 Egyptian premier league and the 2012-13 Egypt cup

Number
1,200 Al-Ahly fans	13,000 Al-Masry fans

Casualties
- Deaths: 74: 72 Al-Ahly fans; 1 Al-Masry fan; 1 police officer
- Injuries: 500+
- Charged: 73 (47 convictions): 11 death sentences; 10 fifteen-year sentences; 9 ten-year sentences; 16 five-year sentences; 1 one-year sentence

The Port Said Stadium riot was a riot which occurred at Port Said Stadium in Port Said, Egypt on 1 February, 2012, following an Egyptian Premier League football match between Al Masry and Al Ahly. Seventy-four people were killed and more than 500 injured after thousands of Al Masry fans invaded the pitch following a 3–1 victory of their club. Al Ahly fans were attacked using clubs, stones, machetes, knives, bottles, and fireworks, trapping them inside the Al Ahly partition of the stadium. Many of the deaths were due to police refusal to open the stadium gates, turning the lights off and trapping fans inside, causing a stampede. Civil unrest and clashes with police erupted in several major cities, such as Cairo, Alexandria, and Suez, in response to police's handling of the riot.

Seventy-three defendants, including nine police officers and two officials from Port Said's Al-Masry club, were charged in the aftermath of the riots. As of 15 November 2015, 26 defendants had been acquitted, including seven police officers and one Al-Masry club official. Of the 47 convicted, 11 were sentenced to death, ten received 15-year prison terms, nine received 10-year sentences, sixteen received 5-year sentences, including two police officers and one Al-Masry club official, and one received a 1-year sentence. The Court of Cassation upheld the sentences on 20 February, 2017.

As a result of the riot, the Egyptian government shut down the domestic league for two years, which affected the Egyptian national team.

== Buildup ==
Two days before the match, the Al Masry ultra group, Ultras Green Eagles, uploaded a song on their YouTube channel threatening the lives of Al Ahly fans. The song was inspired by a 1956 rebel song by Port Said residents and echoed threats issued to British soldiers during the 1956 Suez Crisis, soon before the Moorhouse Affair. The video has since been deleted; however a reupload of the video is still viewable on YouTube.

Normally, Al Ahly fans took buses to stadiums where matches took place. On the day of the massacre, the bus company ordered the fans to pay E£1.5 million as insurance because many people had suspicious feelings that bad things could happen, especially after Al Masry fans uploaded a song threatening lives. This prompted the Al Ahly fans to take trains to Port Said from Cairo. However, the trains did not ride all the way to Port Said and were stopped 15 minutes away from Port Said itself. Military vehicles picked up the Al Ahly fans from trains and drove them to the Port Said Stadium.

== Riot ==
The match kick-off was delayed by thirty minutes because Al-Masry fans were on the pitch. During half-time, and after each of the three second-half goals for Al-Masry, the club's supporters stormed the pitch and, after the match, thousands of spectators ran onto the playing field. Masry fans threw bottles and fireworks at Ahly players, who fled to their changing rooms under police protection. The Masry fans were armed with stones, and some carried knives. They attacked Ahly fans, who tried to flee but were unable to do so, as some of the stadium gates were locked.

In the ensuing melees, 74 people were killed. Some were stabbed and clubbed, while others were thrown off the stands or died in a crowd crush as they were trying to escape through a closed stadium gate behind the stands. Hisham Sheha, an official in the Egyptian health ministry, said stab wounds, brain hemorrhages, and concussions caused the deaths. Over 500 were injured. At least 47 people were arrested after the clashes, according to the Egyptian interior ministry. The Egyptian army airlifted in soldiers by helicopter to rescue the players, who were stranded in their locker rooms.

Ahly coach Manuel José was kicked and punched by Masry fans while attempting to return to his locker room. He was afterward taken to a police station. José and Mohamed Aboutrika reported that they witnessed Ahly fans die in the Ahly locker room. As an immediate reaction to the disaster, Aboutrika decided to retire from football, along with other Egyptian international football stars Mohamed Barakat and Emad Moteab, while José seriously considered leaving Egypt and retiring from coaching football.

Video footage shows that the police were unable or unwilling to contain the attackers. Eyewitnesses said that the police "did nothing to stop it" and "refused to open the closed gates" to allow the crowds to escape. The bureau chief of the Voice of America in Egypt received reports that police opened the barriers separating the Al-Ahly and Al-Masry supporters. Another witness said that many people were allowed into the stadium without tickets. The New York Times reported that a significant factor in the riots was retaliation on the part of the authorities towards the Ultras Ahlawy, who were actively involved in Tahrir Square during the 2011 Egyptian revolution protests, protested Supreme Council of the Armed Forces (SCAF) chair Mohamed Hussein Tantawi's rule, and chanted anti-government revolutionary chants at almost all Ahly games in the Egyptian Premier League.

Some of the Al Ahly fans were killed in ambulances that carried them to local hospitals. Al Masry fans armed with knives stopped ambulances on the way to hospitals, opened the ambulance's doors, and stabbed Al Ahly fans to kill them.

== Reactions ==
The BBC, quoting the Egyptian deputy health minister, described it as "the biggest disaster in the country's football history". The Parliament of Egypt called for an emergency session to be held on 2 February, 2012 to discuss a response. Parliament Speaker Saad El-Katatni of the Muslim Brotherhood questioned whether security forces had responded promptly enough at the start of the riot.

A match between Zamalek and Ismaily, with a 2-1 victory for Zamalek, was discontinued due to the Port Said deaths. Subsequent matches of the 2011–12 Egyptian Premier League were postponed following the disaster. On 10 March, 2012, the Egyptian Football Association announced the cancellation of the remainder of the season. A spokesperson for the Egyptian Football Association said the decision was made because there was insufficient time to play the remaining games before the national team was scheduled to compete in the 2012 Olympics and qualifiers for the 2013 Africa Cup of Nations. FIFA President Sepp Blatter issued a statement that read:

I am very shocked and saddened to learn this evening that a large number of Football supporters have died or been injured following a match in Port Said, Egypt. My thoughts are with the families of those who have lost their lives this evening. This is a black day for football. Such a catastrophic situation is unimaginable and should not happen.

In an interview with British writer Islam Issa, Al-Masry's captain Karim Zekri and his brother, former Masry player Mohamed Zekri, said that the police, army, and ex-regime incited the massacre. They added that there were numerous factors suggesting that it was planned, including the lack of searching and ticket inspection outside the stadium, the floodlights switching off, the welding shut of the away stand's gate, and the arrival of thugs from outside.

José also said that the whole massacre was orchestrated. He said that, at the north end of the stadium, there was a banner in English reading "we are going to kill you all", a slogan that he thought was directed at the international media and not at the teams. He said that the gates at the south end, where the Al-Ahly fans were located, were locked, and some fans died of asphyxiation. He criticized the police, saying they were sitting down rather than facing the pitch and did nothing to stop the repeated pitch invasions during the match. José considered retiring the team at half-time and said the referee should have canceled the match then. He stated that he saw everyone going towards the Al-Ahly end and saw people falling off the stands. He was taken to a VIP room and tried to return to the locker room, but it was impossible to get there. He reported that four people died in the Al-Ahly locker room. José said he wished to remain at Al-Ahly for a couple more years before retiring, as he likes living there, loves the club, and is treated very well.

ESPN.com columnist Brent Latham described the riot as being politically motivated:

It's been widely noted that the circumstances surrounding the riot are suspicious at best. The massacre came on the one-year anniversary of the storming of Tahrir Square by a group of pro-Mubarak counter-revolutionaries. It was directed at a group known for manifesting a liberal political agenda through support for a team founded in the name of historically disenfranchised workers and students. And it occurred at a moment when the interim military government has urged the citizenry to support the extension of emergency powers, and with the seeming complicity of law enforcement and stadium security.

After Italian club Fiorentina loaned Mohamed Salah in 2015, his kit number was 74 in remembrance of 74 people who died in this riot.

== Alleged political involvement ==
Following the incident, anti-government political activists accused the ruling SCAF and remnants of the old regime still in positions of power, asserting that the events were of a "counter-revolutionary" nature. Activists cited a rise in crime levels in the week leading up to the event as evidence that the violence had been organized: in Cairo and Helwan, there were two bank robberies and the heist of an armored vehicle transporting money, and, in Sharm el-Sheikh, an armed robbery in a currency exchange which led to the murder of a French tourist.

The violence in Port Said took place on the eve of the first anniversary of what later became known as "the battle of the camel", when armed thugs stormed protesters in Tahrir Square on camel-back. This was seen by activists as a last-ditch effort by the ruling party to assert control and spread fear of chaos, as Hosni Mubarak, the Egyptian president at the time, had warned in a televised speech on 1 February, 2011, of "chaos" if he was to step down.

People who attended the game stated that, in contrast with standard procedures, no security searches were conducted at the stadium entrances, allowing makeshift weapons to be smuggled in. Eyewitnesses claimed that the attending security personnel took no action to prevent or mitigate the clashes. There were other claims that the gates of the stadium were locked shut, trapping the minority Al-Ahly supporters inside.

Al-Ahly ultras claim that they were specifically targeted, given their vocal, highly televised calls for the SCAF to step down, as well as their open mockery of the previous regime and the SCAF. The ultras were one of the largest organized bodies of resistance in street protests after the absence of the Muslim Brotherhood following parliamentary elections.

== Trials ==
Seventy-three defendants, including nine police officers and two officials from Port Said's Al-Masry club, were charged in the killing of 72 Ahly football club fans. On 26 January, 2013, Port Said Criminal Court, convening at the Police Academy in New Cairo for security reasons, issued preliminary death sentences to 21 defendants. A verdict against the other 52 defendants was postponed to 9 March 2013. There was an outburst of emotion from the defendants' families when the judge announced the preliminary death sentences, requiring him to ask for order in the court several times. Some parents fainted from shock. The Ahly ultras celebrated the verdict by carrying out demonstrations praising the sentence in front of their club branch in Zamalek and demanding the conviction of officers who were involved in the disaster. They then moved their demonstration to the Ministry of Interior headquarters, to assert their demands of prosecuting the officers, resulting in clashes with the police who shot tear gas to disperse the protestors.

The people of Port Said saw the verdict as a political decision rather than a fair trial. Several Port Said officials announced their condemnation on various TV channels. Some of the defendants' families and the Masry ultras gathered around the prison in Port Said, while others went to block the main Mohamed Ali Street leading to the Port Said Governorate headquarters. A third group blocked the gates of a major textile industrial complex that employs about 20,000 workers. Amid the death sentence protests in Port Said, clashes erupted between pro-defendants' protestors and security forces near Port Said General Prison which led to two police officers and 40 civilians being killed and over 250 being injured.

On 9 March, 2013, the court confirmed the 21 death sentences issued on 26 January. Of the remaining 52 defendants, five received life sentences, and ten received 15-year sentences, including two police officers, the former Port Said security director Essam Samak and the head of the Port Said Water Bodies Security Department, Mohamed Saad. Six defendants received 10-year sentences, two received 5-year sentences, and one received a 1-year sentence. The remaining 28 defendants were acquitted, including the other seven police officers charged. They included the former head of the Port Said police investigation department, Mostafa Razaz, the former head of the Central Security Forces in the Suez Canal area, Abdel-Aziz Sami, and the former head of Port Said National Security Directorate, Bahy El-Din Zaghloul. The other four police officers were all aides to these senior officials. Also acquitted were the only two officials from Port Said's Al-Masry club who were charged – Major General Mohsen Sheta, who was executive director of Al-Masry club at the time of the events, and former head of security at the club, Mohamed El-Desouki.

Both the defendants and the prosecution appealed the verdicts. On 6 February, 2014, Egypt's Court of Cassation ordered the retrial of 64 defendants and rejected the appeals of nine defendants sentenced to between 1 and 10 years in prison. On 19 April, 2015, 11 defendants were issued preliminary death sentences in the retrial. The court postponed the verdict on the remaining 53 defendants. On 9 June, 2015, the court confirmed the 11 death sentences and acquitted 21 defendants. Of the remaining 32 defendants, ten received 15-year sentences, nine received 10-year sentences, and thirteen received 5-year sentences, including the two police officers initially sentenced to 15 years in prison, and one official from Port Said's Al-Masry club, Mohsen Sheta, who was previously acquitted. On 23 August, 2015, the court upheld a death sentence issued in absentia to 1 defendant and acquitted 5 of 6 other defendants sentenced in absentia to 10-year prison terms. The remaining defendant had his 10-year sentence issued in absentia reduced to 5 years on 15 November, 2015. On 20 February, 2017, Egypt's Court of Cassation upheld final death sentences for 11 issued in 2015.

== See also ==
- 2009 Egypt–Algeria World Cup Cairo clashes
- Football hooliganism
- Politics and sports
- 30 June Stadium stampede
