= Karim Zekri =

Egyptian footballer (born 1985)

Personal information
- Date of birth: May 10, 1985 (age 41)
- Place of birth: Port Said, Egypt
- Height: 1.93 m (6 ft 4 in)
- Position: Center back

Senior career*
Years	Team	Apps	(Gls)
2005–2007	Al-Masry	?	(4)
2007–2009	Zamalek SC	?	(?)
2009–2011	Petrojet	0	(0)
2011–?	Al-Masry	17	(1)
2012–2013	→ Bani Sweif (loan)		

International career
2003–2005	Egypt U21	-	(2)
- * Club domestic league appearances and goals

Karim Zekri (Arabic: كريم ذكري) is an Egyptian former footballer.

== Career ==
Zekri is currently the club captain of Al-Masry. Zekri made his name at Al-Masry, and became renowned for his good heading and marking ability.

As the captain of the Egyptian Under-21 national team, he reportedly turned down offers from Al Ahly to join Zamalek SC, the club he supports. He then joined Petrojet before returning to his original team, Al-Masry, where he is the fan favourite.

After controversy about Al-Masry's league status in 2012, he signed for Telephonat Bani Sweif on loan before returning in summer 2013.

== Port Said Stadium disaster ==
At the time of the Port Said Stadium disaster which led to over 70 deaths, Zekri was captain of the home team Al-Masry. After the massacre, Zekri went on record saying that the police, army and ex-regime all incited the massacre.

== Personal ==
Karim is the twin brother of striker Mohamed Zekri.

== Honors ==
=== with Zamalek ===
- Egyptian Cup (2008)
