= 2008 Africa Cup of Nations final =

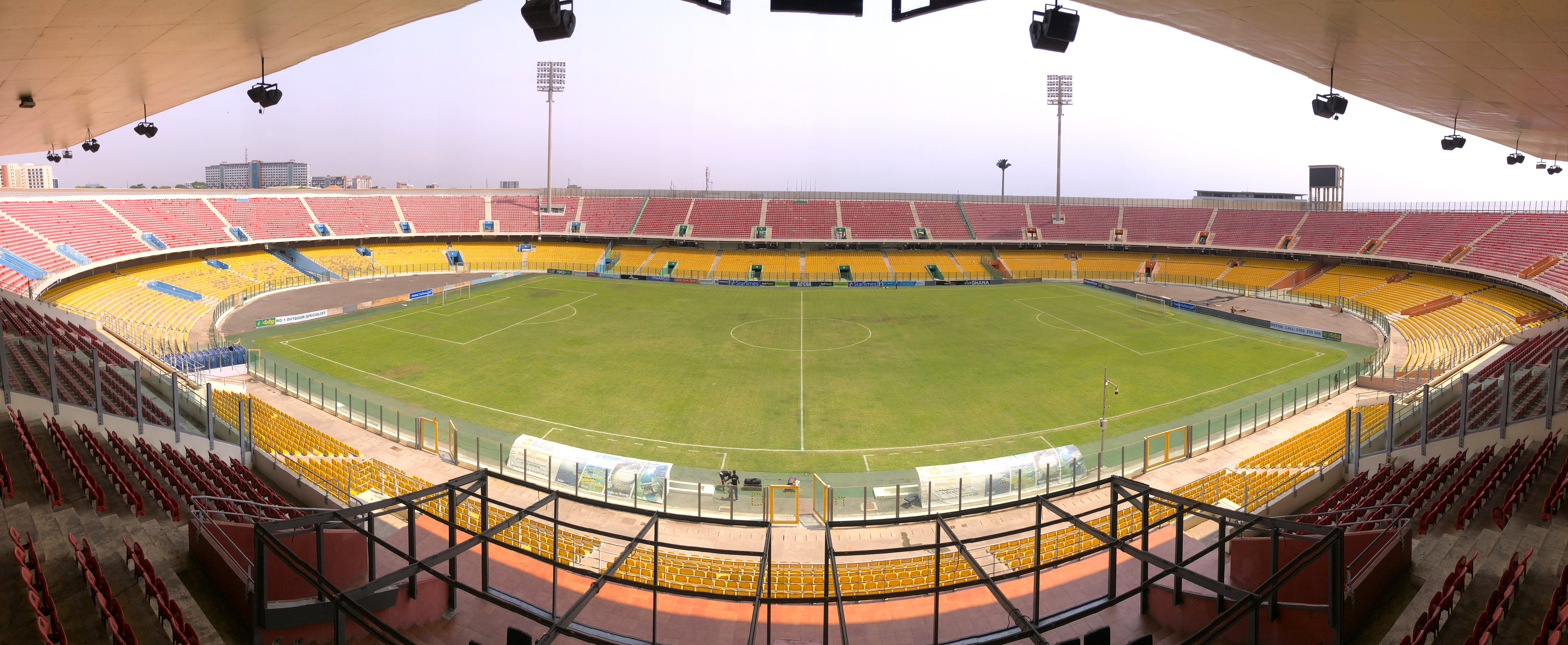
- Event: 2008 Africa Cup of Nations
Cameroon	Egypt
(Cameroon)	(Egypt)
0	1
- Date: 10 February 2008
- Venue: Ohene Djan Stadium, Accra
- Man of the Match: Mohamed Aboutrika (Egypt)
- Referee: Coffi Codjia (Benin)
- Attendance: 35,500

The 2008 Africa Cup of Nations final was a football match that took place on 10 February 2008 at the Ohene Djan Stadium in Accra, Ghana to determine the winner of the 2008 Africa Cup of Nations, the football championship of African national teams organised by the Confederation of African Football (CAF).

It was contested between Cameroon and Egypt. Egypt defeated Cameroon 1–0 to win their sixth title.

== Details ==
10 February 2008
17:00

Cameroon	0–1	Egypt
		Aboutrika 77'

Ohene Djan Stadium, Accra
Attendance: 35,500
Referee: Coffi Codjia (Benin)

Cameroon	Egypt

GK	1	Carlos Kameni
CB	14	Joël Epalle
CB	4	Rigobert Song (c)
CB	3	Bill Tchato
RM	8	Geremi
CM	19	Stéphane Mbia		(substituted off) 65'
CM	15	Alex Song		(substituted off) 16'
LM	5	Timothée Atouba	(yellow card) 62'
AM	10	Achille Emaná		(substituted off) 56'
AM	12	Alain N'Kong
CF	9	Samuel Eto'o
Substitutions:
MF	2	Gilles Binya		(substituted on) 16'
FW	17	Mohamadou Idrissou	(yellow card) 88'	(substituted on) 56'
MF	7	Modeste M'bami		(substituted on) 65'
Manager:
(Germany) Otto Pfister

GK	1	Essam El-Hadary
CB	20	Wael Gomaa
CB	6	Hany Said
CB	5	Shady Mohamed
RM	7	Ahmed Fathy
CM	17	Ahmed Hassan (c)	(yellow card) 87'
CM	8	Hosny Abd Rabo
LM	14	Sayed Moawad
AM	22	Mohamed Aboutrika		(substituted off) 89'
CF	10	Emad Moteab		(substituted off) 60'
CF	19	Amr Zaki		(substituted off) 84'
Substitutions:
FW	9	Mohamed Zidan		(substituted on) 60'
MF	11	Mohamed Shawky		(substituted on) 84'
DF	4	Ibrahim Said		(substituted on) 89'
Manager:
Hassan Shehata

Man of the match
Mohamed Aboutrika (Egypt)

Assistant referees:
Célestin Ntagungira (Rwanda)
Enock Molefe (South Africa)
Fourth official:
Eddy Maillet (Seychelles)

Match rules

- 90 minutes.
- 30 minutes of extra-time if necessary.
- Penalty shoot-out if scores still level.
- Twelve named substitutes.
- Maximum of three substitutions.
