= Ultras White Knights =

Egyptian Ultras Group For Zamalek SC

- Abbreviation: UWK07
- Founded: 17 March 2007 (19 years ago)
- Type: Ultras group
- Club: Zamalek
- Location: Cairo - Giza, Egypt
- Arenas: Cairo International Stadium; Helmy Zamora Stadium
- Stand: Sud
- Colours

Logo of Ultras White Knights

Ultras White Knights often referred as UWK07 is an Egyptian Ultras group that supports Zamalek SC in every sport. It was founded on 17 March 2007. The group occupies the Third Right stand, commonly known as the "Curva Sud"

== Formation ==
UWK's first appearance was in a CAF Champions League match between Zamalek and Al-Hilal on 17 March 2007, the stadium was full. The group was formed by a group of hardcore Zamalek SC fans who decided to replicate the European and North African "Ultras" subculture in Egypt. The group's leader was Sayed "Moshagheb" Ali Fahim, who was incarcerated for 9 years based on political charges but was released in April 2026, where he was rearrested just hours later, based on charges of "Disturbing the Peace", and "Unlawful Assembly" When past members and current members of the unofficial group gathered to celebrate his return. He was then released on October 19th 2026.

== Status ==
Since May 2015, following the 30 June Stadium Stampede Ultras groups in Egypt were classified as Terrorist Groups after a ruling where Cairo's Court for Urgent Matters issued a ruling banning all ultras activities and designating the groups as terrorist organizations.

The Group Officially announced their dissolution on May 27, 2018, marking its end by burning its banner. A symbolic act also performed by their rivals Ultras Ahlawy

However, the group has continued unofficial activity both abroad and localy, making frequent appearances, with chants, merch, and songs under both the Ultras White Knights name, and the UWKmedia Channels on Facebook, and YouTube.

== Rivalries ==
Ultras White Knights' main rivalry with rival group Ultras Ahlawy stems from the already existing club rivalry between their respective clubs, Zamalek and Al-Ahly, nicknamed the Cairo derby.

The two groups have exchanged insults, burned banners & gotten involved with clashes against each other since their formation in 2007. With notable incidents being a 2008 Handball clash which had a Zamalek fan hospitalized with severe burns, and regular fines by the EFA after insults during matches

For more information about the club rivalry Check "Cairo derby"

== Political Leaning ==
Although the group has repeatedly denied any political orientation or affiliation whatsoever, the group became heavily politicized during the 2011 Egyptian revolution and was thrust into the national spotlight. Although the group did not "officially" attend, thousands of UWK members fought on the front lines in the Tahrir Square.

Following the revolution, the group was viewed by Egyptian governments as a highly organized, volatile street movement. They were locked in feuds with pro-regime figures, with the most notable one being the controversial former Zamalek president Mortada Mansour. He and state media frequently labeled the group as "terrorists" and "delinquents".

Years of clashes with the Egyptian Central Security forces inside and outside stadiums also fostered a deep-seated anti-regime and anti-police subculture. With chants frequently referencing and insulting the Egyptian regime, and against political corruption.
