= Mohamed Zekri =

Egyptian footballer (born 1985)

Personal information
- Date of birth: May 10, 1985 (age 41)
- Place of birth: Port Said, Egypt
- Height: 1.94 m (6 ft 4 in)
- Position: Striker

Senior career*
Years	Team	Apps	(Gls)
2005–2008	Al-Masry	?	(19)
2008–2010	Tersana	?	(4)
2010	Al Mareekh FC	0	(3)
2011–?	Damietta FC	?	(10)

International career
2005–2007	Egypt U21	7	(2)
- * Club domestic league appearances and goals

Mohamed Zekri (born May 10, 1985) is an Egyptian former football striker. He was the tallest player in the Egyptian Premier League at the time.

Mohamed is the twin brother of defender Karim Zekri, but he is a bit physically larger.
