= Ultras Ahlawy =

Egyptian ultras group of Al-Ahly fans

- Abbreviation: UA07
- Founded: 13 April 2007
- Type: Ultras group
- Club: Al Ahly SC
- Motto: Together Forever
- Location: Cairo, Egypt
- Arenas: Cairo International Stadium; Mokhtar El Tetsh Stadium
- Stand: Nord
- Colours

Ultras Ahlawy (UA07; Arabic: ألتراس أهلاوي)is an Egyptian ultras group that supports the Cairo-based Egyptian Premier League football club Al Ahly. It is the First Ultras group in Egypt. The group was founded in 2007 by former members of the first Ahly support group, Ahly Fans Club (AFC). Ultras Ahlawy raised its banner for the first time at a match against ENPPI on 13 April 2007. Ultras Ahlawy also supports the Al Ahly basketball, volleyball, and handball teams. The group was banned in 2015 along other Ultras groups in Egypt due to a government decision and many arrests to the group’s members took place, though many of the group’s members remain undercover and support Al Ahly during scheduled & friendly matches overseas.

== History ==
Ultras Ahlawy first became known for its banners and pyro shows. Later the group began introducing derby matches chanting "We Are Egypt". Ultras Ahlawy also introduced long-form supportive songs to Egyptian stadiums. On 16 March 2018 Ultras Ahlawy announced on Facebook that they will freeze their activity for an indefinite period of time because of arrests of their members by the police.

== Banner and pyro displays ==
Ultras Ahlawy is known for its members' banners at both home and away games. The most famous examples were the El-Ahly logo at a SuperSport United F.C. match in the CAF Champions League, the red devil at a Zamalek match in the Premier League, and a Freedom for Ultras banner at the match against Espérance in the CAF Champions League.

During a match against ZESCO United F.C. in the CAF Champions League, Ultras Ahlawy made a pyro show in the 55th minute.

== Members ==
Ultras Ahlawy members include college graduates, workers, and youth from many social levels in Egypt. Their slogan is "Together Forever", meant to highlight the connections between their members. Other slogans are "WE ARE EGYPT", "The best club in the Universe" or "The best club in existence" (Egyptian pronunciation:A'zam Nady Fi El Koon), and "Feel Pride Never Hide You Are Ultras Ahlawy". Members tend to quickly become tight-knit in the group, and their role increases with time. The group produced a CD titled "A'zam Nady Fi El Koon", featuring all the Ultras Ahlawy songs.

While playing a match against the Tunisian club Al-Taraji, some of the group's members were sent to jail. The other members drew the faces of every person sent to jail and wrote "Freedom for ultras" in Egyptian Arabic banners.

== Confrontations with police ==
In July 2010 the Ultras decided not to attend matches after clashing fiercely with the police in a pre-season friendly. The board president called on fans to stop boycotting Ahly's matches and once again support the club from the stands. The group asked for its rights, and asked the club for protection from police attacks against supporters.

Reconciliation efforts came days ahead of Ahly's crucial Champions League showdown against Algeria's JS Kabylie (Shabibat Al Kabylie).

== Role in the Egyptian Revolution of 2011 ==
On 24 January 2011, the night before the commencement of the Egyptian 25 January revolution, Ultras Ahlawy published a statement that the group would not be a part of the demonstrations on the following day in its official form, however, each member of the group is free to be part of the demonstrations. This statement is in compliance with the Ultras Mentality as Ultras groups are only for supporting their clubs, politics is not part of Ultras concern. However, Ultras Ahlawy members played a key role in the Egyptian Revolution of 2011, along with the Ultras White Knights.

== Port Said massacre ==
After the stepping down of the Mubarak regime, Ultras members continued to be part of various revolutionary demonstrations against the Supreme Council of the Armed Forces. The most popular were the Muhammad Mahmoud demonstrations in addition to the Egyptian Cabinet's. During the latter, Muhammad Mustapha Kareeka, a member of Ultras Ahlawy, fell as a martyr, which outraged the Ultras, leading them to chant against SCAF on the following Ahly match against Masr El Makassa.

The first away match for Al Ahly after Kareeka death was on 1 February 2012 against Masry of Portsaid, on that day and after the whistle was blown, thousands of Masry supporters led by the rivals Ultras Green Eagles broke through the stadium. With the help of security forces, Masry supporters entered Al Ahly fans' territory and assaulted them, leading to the death of 72 members of Ultras Ahlawy and Ultras Devils members in what was later known as the Port Said Stadium riot.

Ultras Ahlawy, Devils and several other social and political entities started numerous demonstrations demanding the rights of those who died in Port Said, such as the march by UA07 on 5 February to the District Attorney office.

Later, over 70 convicts were charged with homicide including 9 police officers and three Portsaid stadium workers.

On 26 January 2013, 21 of the convicted Masry supporters were sentenced to death. The verdict for the rest of the convicts is to be decided on 9 March 2013.

== Gallery ==
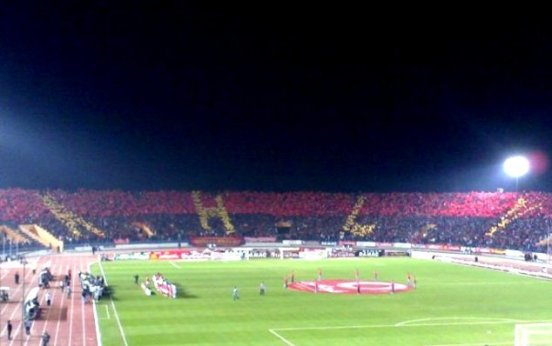
Ultras Ahlawy Tifo Before cairo derby in 2007–08 Egyptian Premier League

== See also ==
- Domestic responses to the Egyptian Revolution of 2011
