= Zamalek Stadium disaster =

1974 crowd crush in Cairo, Egypt

Zamalek stadium disaster
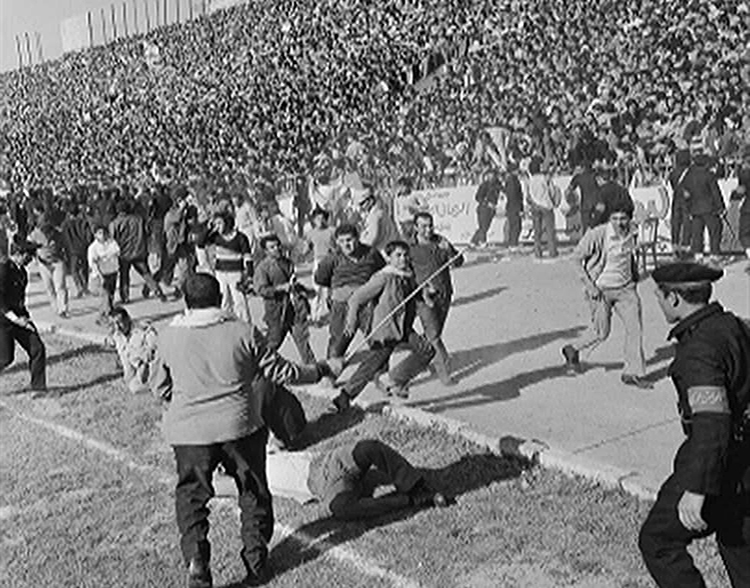
- Date: 17 February 1974
- Location: Zamalek Stadium, Cairo, Egypt; 30°3′31″N 31°12′13″E
- Cause: Crowd crush
- Deaths: at least 48
- Injuries: 50

A crowd crush occurred on 17 February 1974 when fans were crushed before the kick-off of a football friendly match at the Zamalek Stadium in Cairo between Zamalek of Egypt and Dukla Prague of Czechoslovakia.

The total death toll is reported variously as 48, 49, or 50; 50 more were injured during this event.

Following a change of venue for the match, many supporters thought they would not be able to enter the newly chosen stadium (because the previously intended venue, Nasser Stadium, was much larger). There was a stampede, the walls crumbled, and many people were left dead. According to reports, up to 80,000 people tried to access the stadium, despite the capacity at the time being just 40,000. It was the first football disaster in Egypt.
