= 1950–51 Al Ahly SC season =

Al Ahly
1950–51 season
- Chairman: Ahmed Aboud Pacha
- Stadium: Al-Hawsh
- Egyptian Premier League: Winners
- Egypt Cup: Winners
- Cairo League: Runner-up
- Top goalscorer: Fathi Khattab (9 goals)

The 1950–51 Al Ahly SC season was the

In the 1950–51 season, Al Ahly won the double, by winning the league for the third consecutive season despite the strong competition with Zamalek. The Red Giants completed the double with a difficult victory in the Egyptian Cup final against El Sekka El Hadid.

== Competitions ==
=== Overview ===
Competition	Starting round	Final position	Record							
Competition	Starting round	Final position	Pld	W	D	L	GF	GA	GD	Win %
Egyptian Premier League	Matchday 1	Winners	18	10	5	3	31	12	+19	55.56
Egypt Cup	Round of 16	Winners	4	4	0	0	7	0	+7	100.00
Total			22	14	5	3	38	12	+26	63.64

Source: Competitions

=== Egyptian Premier League ===
==== League table ====
Pos	Club	Pld	W	D	L	F	A	Pts
1	Al Ahly(C)	18	10	5	3	31	12	25
2	Zamalek	18	11	3	4	27	17	25
3	Al Masry	18	8	6	4	25	21	22
4	Tersana SC	18	8	4	6	17	14	20
5	El Sekka El Hadid	18	7	4	7	23	17	18
6	Ismaily SC	18	5	7	6	23	24	17
7	Al Ittihad	18	5	5	8	14	20	15
8	Olympic	18	5	5	8	12	20	15
9	Port Fuad	18	5	3	10	19	27	13
10	Teram	18	3	4	11	15	34	10

(C)= Champions, Pld = Matches played; W = Matches won; D = Matches drawn; L = Matches lost; F = Goals for; A = Goals against; ± = Goal difference; Pts = Points.

=== Matches ===
Opponent	Venue	Result	Scorers
El Sekka El Hadid	H	3–1	Fathi Khattab (2), Sedki
Port Fuad	A	3–3	Mannas, Fathi Khattab, Saleh Selim
Teram	A	0–2	
Al Masry	A	1–2	Sedki
Tersana	H	2–0	Fathi Khattab, El-Guindi
Al Ittihad	A	0–0	
Ismaily	A	1–1	Sedki
Olympic	H	4–0	Hussein Madkour (3), Fathi Khattab
Zamalek	H	2–0	Helmi Maati, El-Guindi
El Sekka El Hadid	A	2–0	Fathi Khattab, Abdel Nabi
Port Fuad	H	1–0	Fathi Khattab
Teram	A	1–1	
Al Ittihad	H	3–0	Ahmed Mekkawi (2), Toto
Tersana	A	3–0	
Al Masry	H	1–0	Fathi Khattab
Ismaily	A	1–1	Ahmed Mekkawi
Olympic	A	0–1	
Zamalek	A	3–0	Sayed Metwally, Hussein Madkour, Ahmed Mekkawi

== Egypt Cup ==
=== First round ===
Team 1	Score	Team 2
Al Ahly	2–0	El Qanah

=== Quarter-final ===
Team 1	Score	Team 2
Al Ahly	3–0	Teram

=== Semi-final ===
Team 1	Score	Team 2
Al Ahly	1–0	Ismaily

=== Final ===
20 April 1951

Al Ahly	1–0	El Sekka El Hadid
Ahmed Mekkawi
