= Al Ahly SC =

Association football club in Egypt

Al Ahly
- Full name: Al Ahly Sporting Club
- Nicknames: الشياطين الحمر (The Red Devils) نادي القرن الإفريقي (African Club of the Century) القلعة الحمراء (The Red Castle) نادي الوطنية (Club of Patriotism) المارد الأحمر (The Red Giant)
- Short name: AHL
- Founded: 24 April 1907; 119 years ago
- Ground: Cairo International Stadium
- Capacity: 75,000
- Chairman: Mahmoud El Khatib
- Manager: Hussein Ammouta
- League: Egyptian Premier League
- 2025–26: Egyptian Premier League, 3rd of 18
- Website: alahlyegypt.com/en
Home colours	Away colours	Third colours

Al Ahly Sporting Club (Arabic: النادي الأهلي للرياضة البدنية), commonly known as Al Ahly (Arabic: الأهلي, lit. 'the national'), is a professional sports club based in Cairo, Egypt. The club is mainly known for its professional football team which plays in the Egyptian Premier League, the highest tier in the Egyptian league system. They are known to be the most successful club in world football based on league titles.

Founded on 24 April 1907, the club is renowned for its consistent success at both domestic and continental levels, regularly contending in CAF tournaments. Al Ahly has a record of 45 Egyptian Premier League titles, 39 Egypt Cup titles, and 16 Egyptian Super Cups. In international competitions, Al Ahly has won a record 12 CAF Champions League titles, 1 CAF Confederation Cup, a record of 8 CAF Super Cups, a record of 4 African Cup Winners' Cups, 1 Afro-Asian Club Championship, 1 Arab Club Champions Cup, 1 Arab Cup Winners' Cup, a record of 2 Arab Super Cups, and has won 4 bronze medals in the FIFA Club World Cup.

Al Ahly is the most decorated club in the world with 125 official titles. With 26 continental titles, Al Ahly was voted by CAF as the African club of the 20th century. Al Ahly became the most valuable sports club in Africa, with a market value of €30 million as of the 2023–24 season.

== History ==
=== Establishment and start of the club ===
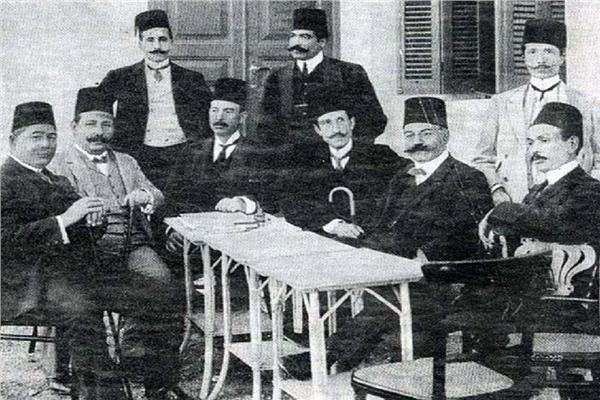
The first official meeting of the Al Ahly club's board

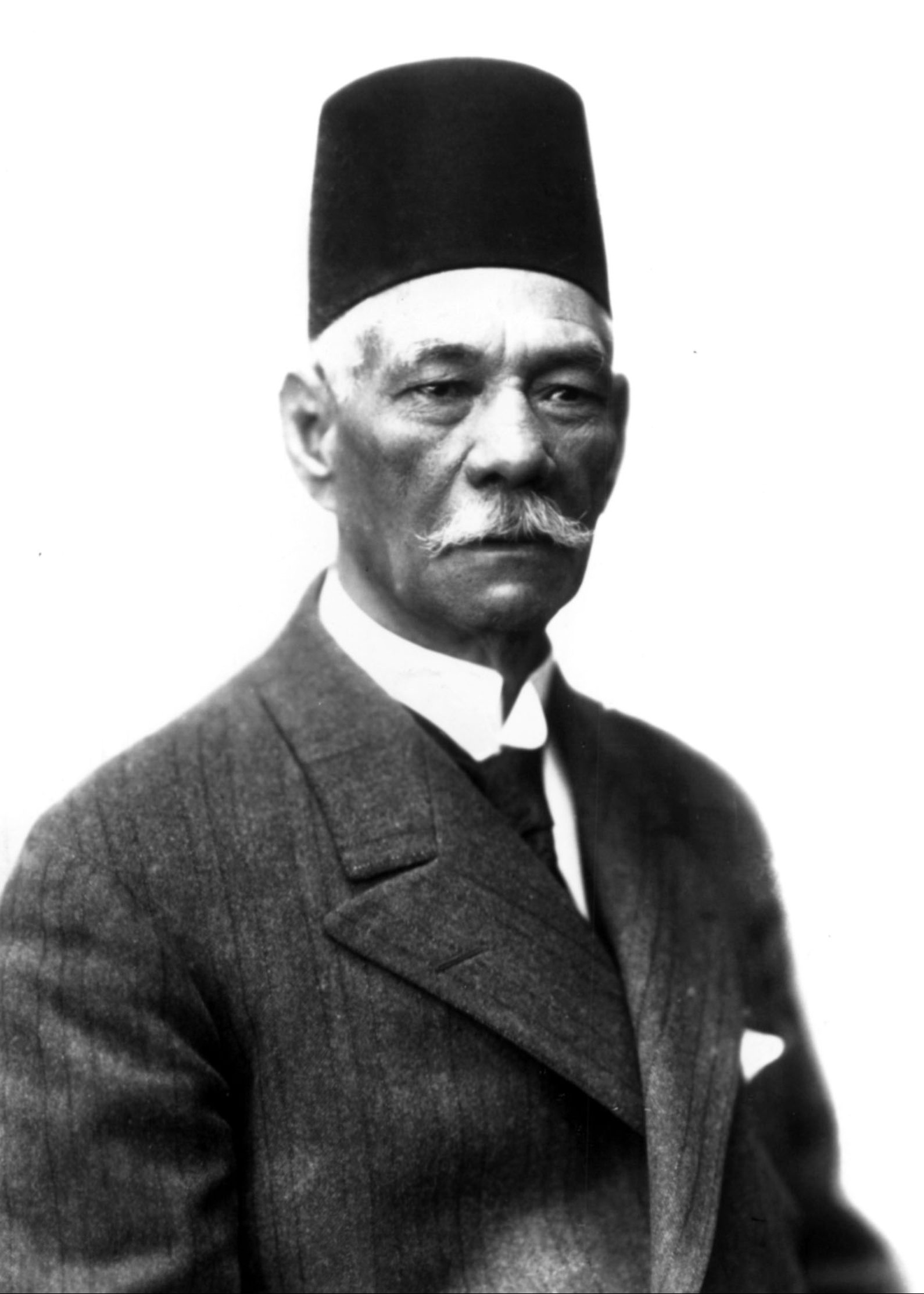
Saad Zaghloul, the minister of education, was the first honorary president of Al Ahly.

The idea of establishing Al Ahly came in the first 10 years of the 20th century and was firstly raised by Omar Lotfy, who was a student in the Egyptian Law School during his presidency of the High School Students Club. The establishment of a club for high school students was for political reasons along with the students needing a sports club for them to gather for leisure and exercise.

He discussed the idea of establishing the club with a group of friends who were enthusiastic about it and in 1907, Al Ahly was established.

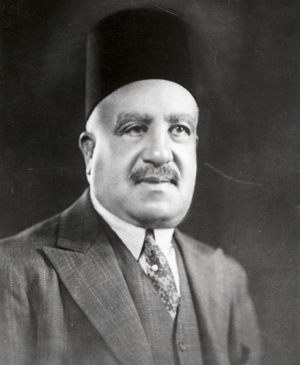
Talaat Harb, president of the Bank of Egypt, contributed £E100 to the establishment of the club.

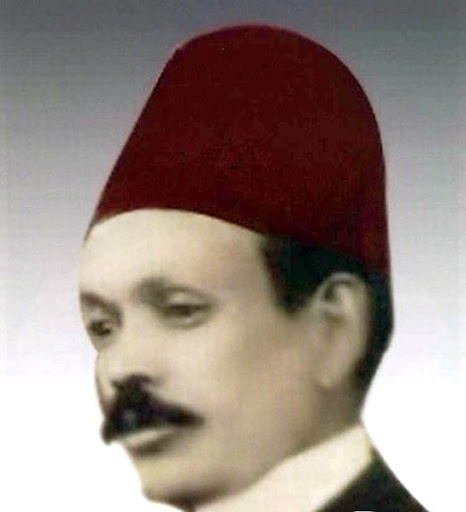
Omar Lotfy, founder of Al Ahly

The club was first headed by Alfred Mitchell-Innes, who was a British advisor to the Ministry of Finance at the time. He was the first head to facilitate financial support for the club. An official meeting of the club's board was held on 24 April 1907. The committee met at 5:30 pm in the house of Mitchell-Innes in Giza under his chairmanship and the membership of Idris Ragheb Bey, Ismael Seri Pasha, Amin Sami Pasha, Omar Lotfi Bek and Mohamed Effendi Sherif as secretary.

After the establishment of the club was approved, the main building was designed by architect Ismail Seri, and revised by Mitchell-Innes. A civil company on the behalf of Al Ahly Sports Club was established. Shares of the company were worth £E5 each, and it was the goal of the club when it was established to raise £E5,000. Only £E3,165 were collected over a year which was not enough to fund the establishment. This forced the club to borrow £E1,000 from the National Bank of Egypt in March 1908. Talaat Harb, the president of the Bank of Egypt, contributed £E100 to the establishment of the club.

The first honorary president of the club was the Minister of Education Saad Zaghloul. The name of Al Ahly Sporting Club was suggested by Amine Samy Amin, who suggested that the name is similar to the word "National" in Egyptian Arabic. On 2 April 1908, Mitchell-Innes stepped down as president of the club. Aziz Ezzat was appointed as the new president and became the first Egyptian president of Al Ahly. The official opening ceremony of the club was held in its main building on 26 February 1909.

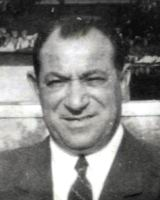
Mokhtar El Tetsh, one of the club legends, is the namesake of the club's old stadium and current training ground.

The game of football was not one of the goals of the founders of Al Ahly SC, but rather to open its doors to students of high schools to meet and practice political dialogues. However, the graduates of high schools who were members of the club developed a passion with football, which prompted the club to build the first stadium in 1909. At the time, they called it Al-Hawsh; colloquially meaning the courtyard in Egyptian Arabic. The stadium was improved over the years, eventually becoming Mokhtar El-Tetsh Stadium.

The first official football team was established in 1911. The team was primary and secondary school players who played football in Al-Hawsh. The names of the first players of Al Ahly were as follows: Hussein Hegazi, Abdel Fattah Taher, Fouad Darwish, Hussein Mansour, and Ibrahim Fahmy.

In 1915, Al Ahly made tours to Egyptian cities to play matches and to spread football and its culture. Al Ahly played in Alexandria, Port Said, Assiut, and Ismailia. The team, led by Hussein Hegazi, faced many teams, including foreign teams belonging to the British Army, which increased the popularity of Al Ahly and the new game in Egypt. Ahly contributed with Zamalek SC, El Sekka El Hadid SC in the formation of the first football team of Egypt to participate in the 1920 Olympic Games. The club also contributed to the establishment of the Egyptian Football Association.

=== First titles (1918–1948) ===
After Al Ahly's refusal to compete with British clubs in the Sultan Hussein Cup in its first edition in 1917, the club's management decided to participate in the 1918 championship as a sign of resistance and to display Egyptian presence in the sport. In 1923, Al Ahly won their first Sultan Hussain Cup after beating the defending champion Zamalek SC, with them winning six other titles to be the record holder in the number of wins until the last edition in 1938. They also played an active role in the establishment of the Egyptian Tennis Federation. The club followed their first win of the Sultan Hussain Cup with the King Farouk Cup in 1924, defeating El Sekka El Hadid 4–1 in the final. The man of the match was Mokhtar Eltetsh, who scored two goals.

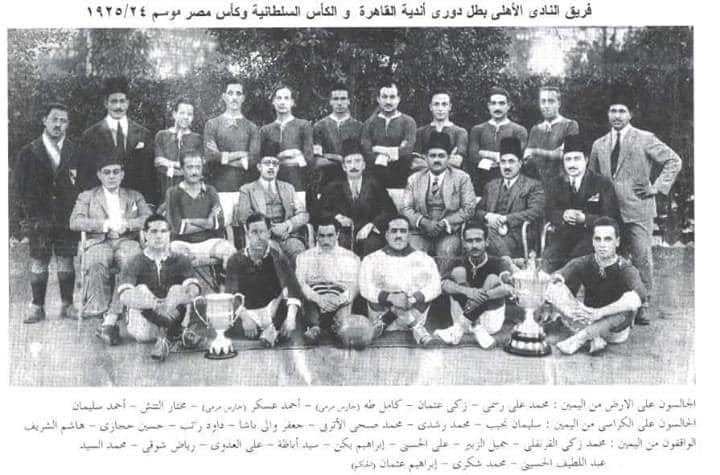
Al Ahly squad in 1925 with the Sultan Hussein and King Farouk Cups

In the summer of 1929, Al Ahly's football went on a tour where the team traveled to face several European clubs, such as Fenerbahçe and Galatasaray in Turkey and BFC Preussen, 1860 Munich and Schalke in Germany. The tour ended with Al Ahly playing the last two games in Bulgaria against Levski Sofia and Slavia Sofia. In November 1930, Al Ahly defeated rival Zamalek 4–0 in a match in the Cairo League. In that game, Mokhtar El Tetsh was the first player to score a hat trick in the Cairo Derby. At the end of the 1936–1937 season, Al Ahly managed to win the league in the last round by defeating Zamalek 4–1, finishing three points ahead of their rivals. The club won the King Farouk Cup with a 3–2 victory over El Sekka El Hadid SC. In 1938, Al Ahly won the last version of the Sultan Hussein Cup, with a 1–0 victory over Al Masry in the final match. The club won the Cairo League, again in the last round, with a 5–1 victory over the second placed Zamalek.

The team traveled to Mandatory Palestine in 1943 on a 23-day tour, headed by Mokhtar El Tetsh, to play several matches with Arab teams to support Palestine against the Zionists. The decision had been made despite the refusal of the president of the Egyptian Football Association Haider Pasha, due to the pressure from the British position against the Palestinian issue.

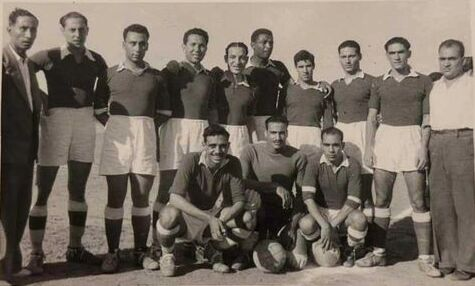
Al Ahly team in Tel Aviv-Yafo, Mandatory Palestine

=== Dominating the league (1948–1967) ===
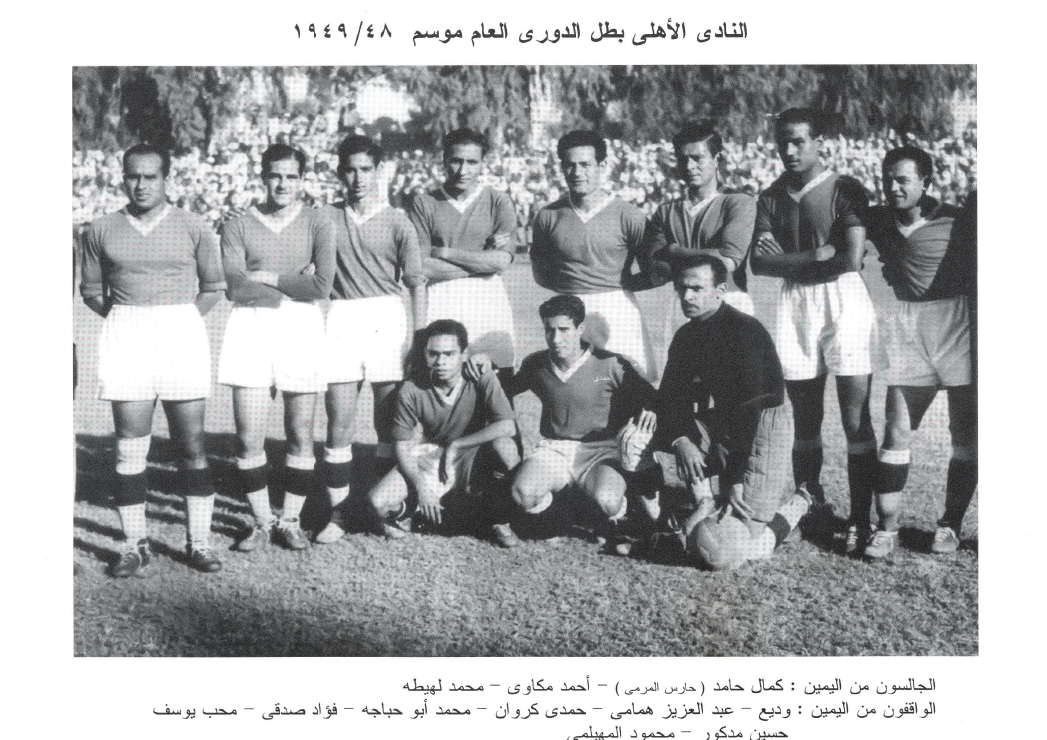
Al Ahly squad in the first Egyptian League

In the first edition of the Egyptian Premier League, held for the first time in 1948, Al Ahly won the first match 5–0 against Greek Alexandria. Ahmed Makkawi scored the first goal for Al Ahly in the history of the competition in the 11th minute. The first team to represent Al Ahly in the competition was composed of: Kamal Hamed – Abdulaziz Hamami – Muhammad Abu Habajah – Abdel Moneim Shatara – Sayed Othman – Hilmi Abu Al-Moaty – Fouad Sedki – Muhammad Lheta – Ahmed Mekkawi – Saleh Selim – Fathi Khattab. Mokhatr al Tetsh led Al Ahly to win the first championship in the club's history as a player and also led the club to win the first league in the club's history as a manager, achieving a double of the league and the cup for the first time after defeating Zamalek 3–1 in the 1949 King Farouk Cup final. Toto, Hussein Madkour and Fathi Khattab scored for Al Ahly.

The 1949–50 season was a historical superiority for Al Ahly, winning all the local championships. Al Ahly won the Egyptian Premier League after a tie in points with Tersana. The league winner was decided by a play-off match with Al Ahly winning the match against Tersana 2–1. The club also won the Cairo League, one point ahead of Tersana. In the Egypt Cup, Al Ahly defeated Tersana in the final 6–0.

In the 1950–51 season, Al Ahly won the league for the third consecutive time despite the strong competition with Zamalek, as well as a difficult victory in the King Farouk Cup final against El Sekka El Hadid. Following the dethroning of King Farouk in the 1952 revolution, Ahly appointed Gamal Abdel Nasser as club honorary president.

In the 1951–52 season, the league championship was cancelled due to the Egyptian revolution that year, and to allow the national team to prepare for the 1952 Summer Olympics. However, the Egypt Cup and the Cairo League were played as normal. Al Ahly lost both tournaments to Zamalek. The league returned the following season and Al Ahly won the league for the fourth time in a row, with a narrow two-point lead ahead of Zamalek, after the two teams tied 2–2 in the last round. In the cup, Al Ahly managed to defeat the defending champions Zamalek 4–1 in the final.

In the 1953–54 season, Al Ahly won their fifth consecutive and fifth overall Egyptian Premier League title in the club's history. In the cup, they were eliminated from the semi-final by Al Masry.

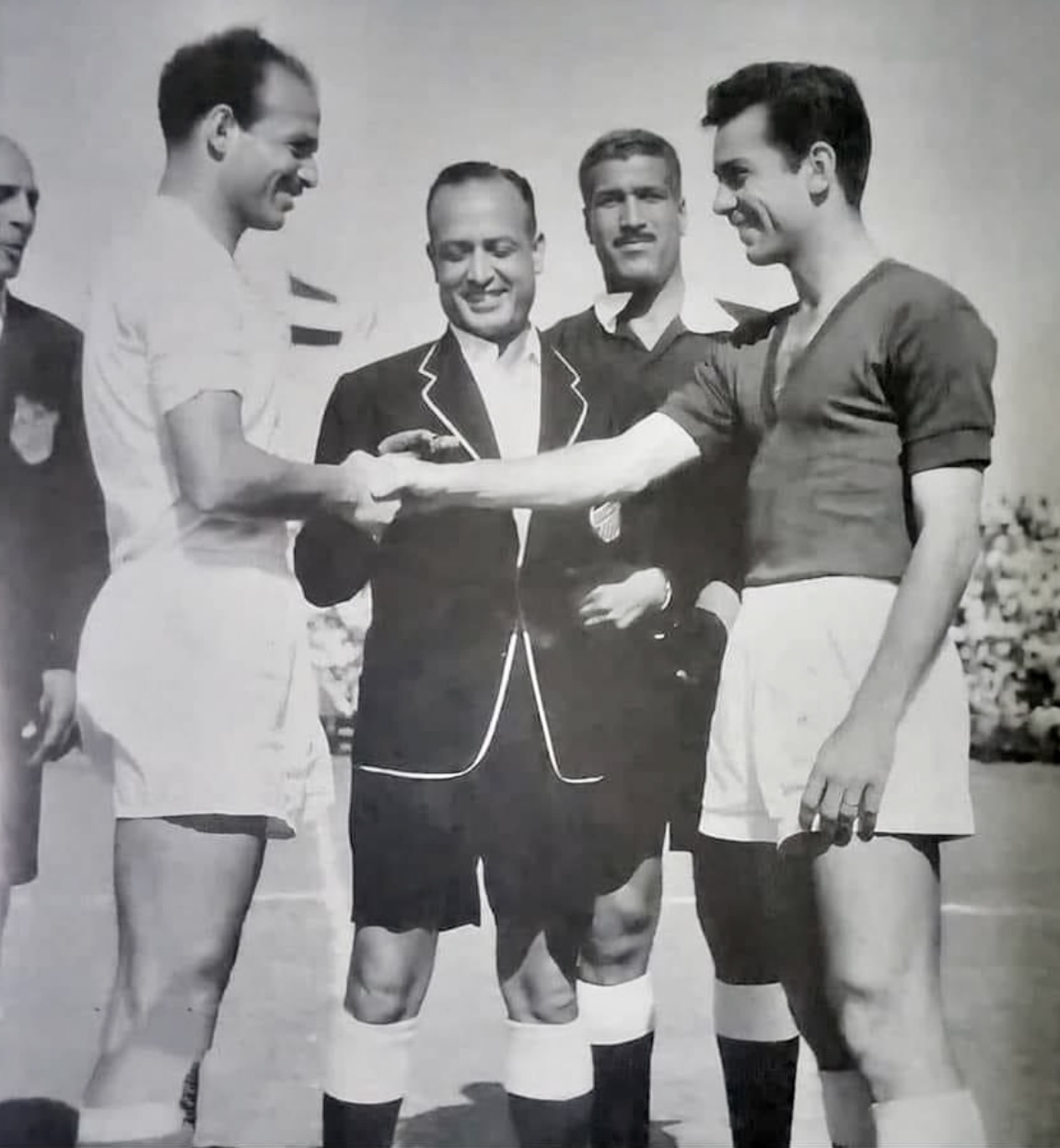
Al Ahly's captain Saleh Selim shaking hands with Zamalek's captain Nour El-Dali and referee preparing to make a coin toss before playing the 1959 Egypt Cup final

In the 1956–57 season, the number of teams increased to 14 teams, and Al Ahly managed to win the league nine points ahead of Zamalek, to win the seventh title in a row. It was the first time that the team had reached 40 points. Al Ahly won the 1958–59 league championship for the ninth time in a row. El-Sayed El-Dhizui became the first Al Ahly player to be the top goal scorer in the league. The team scored 55 goals in just 18 games that season, more than 20 goals from their nearest competitors.

After losing the league for the first time since the start of the competition in the 1959–60 season, Al Ahly won the league for the tenth time in the club's history, in the 1960–61 season. The club won the Egypt Cup after defeating El Qanah 5–0, with Mimi El-Sherbini scoring two goals.

=== First participation in African championships (1967–1980) ===
After the 1967 Six-Day War and the suspension of sporting activity in Egypt, Al Ahly's board, headed by Ibrahim Kamel El-Wakil, announced that the club will host the military training for the members volunteering in the Egyptian Army, as well as collecting donations in the name of the club to support the military.

Many players on the team retired to volunteer for the war. Al Ahly did not win the league for another 13 years.

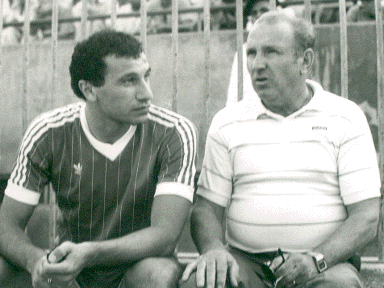
Nándor Hidegkuti and Mahmoud El Khatib

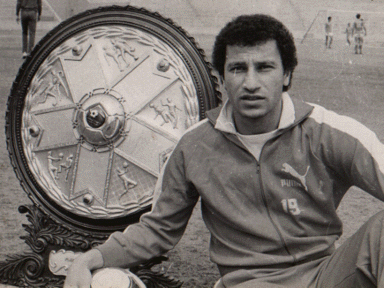
El Khatib with the 1976–77 League championship

After years of deterioration, the club took the first steps in recovery when the management decided to sign Nándor Hidegkuti as head coach in September 1973, at a salary of fewer than 600 dollars. Hidegkuti introduced a new generation known as El Talamza (the students). The league title returned to Al Ahly in 1974–75, with the team scoring 70 goals in 34 games. Al Ahly's first participation in the African Champions League was in 1976. The team got knocked out from the first round by MC Alger. Al Khatib scored the first continental goal for Al Ahly.

Al Ahly won the Egyptian top-flight football league in 1975–76 and 1976–77. The latter season saw the second participation in African competition, where the team fared better than the first time. They eventually bowed out in the quarter-finals by Accra Hearts of Oak S.C. From 1978 to 1980, Hidegkuti refused to take part in the CAF Champions League due to lack of financial resources and exhausting journeys in Africa.

=== Invading Africa (1980–1990) ===
Zamalek remained ahead of Al Ahly by six points in the 1981–82 Egyptian Premier League season. That season, a match won was counted in two points, not three. The last matches in the competition witnessed a dip in form by Zamalek with Al Ahly managing to win the championship with three points ahead of them, after a goalless Cairo derby draw in the last round. Al Ahly reached the semi-final of 1981 African Cup of Champions Clubs but withdrew due to the assassination of the President Anwar Sadat.

Al Ahly won the 1982 African Cup of Champions Clubs, known today as the CAF Champions League, defeating Asante Kotoko S.C. in the final. The first leg was held on 28 November at the Cairo Stadium in front of 60,000 spectators. They won the first leg 3–0. The second leg was held on 12 December in Kumasi, Ghana, and was attended by more than 70,000 spectators. In the second leg, the game ended tied 1–1. Al Ahly during this edition of the tournament played ten games, achieved victory in all five games at home, lost two games and tied in three away. The biggest win was a 5–0 victory against Young Africans S.C. in the round of 16. The club scored 16 goals and conceded five goals only in this tournament. Al Ahly reached the final of the African Champions League for the second time in a row in 1983, but Asante Kotoko S.C. won the finals by scoring the only goal of both matches in the second match. The first leg was played on 27 November at Cairo Stadium with 90,000 spectators, with one of the attendees being the former Egyptian president Hosni Mubarak, and ended tied 0–0. The second leg took place on 11 December in Kumasi with 70,000 spectators, and ended with a 0–1 loss.

Al Ahly reached a continental final again in 1984, this time in the African Cup Winners' Cup against Canon Yaoundé. Al Ahly won on penalties after a 1–1 draw in both games. The 1984–85 season was one of the best seasons in the history of Al Ahly, as the club won the cup and the league, as well as winning the African Cup Winners Cup for the second time in a row by defeating Leventis United 2–1 on aggregate. For the third time in a row, Al Ahly won the African Cup Winners' Cup in 1986 after winning the league, by defeating AS Sogara in the final 3–2 on aggregate.

Al Ahly won the Egyptian League in the 1986–87 season under the management of the coach Taha Ismail. Al Ahly won the league being two points ahead of Zamalek after being tied in the standings before the last match. The club was able to beat Zamalek in the last round 2–1.

Al Ahly won the 1987 African Cup of Champions Clubs by defeating Al-Hilal Club in the final. The first leg was a 0–0 draw played on 29 November in the Sudanese capital Khartoum, attended by 50,000 Sudanese and 500 Egyptian spectators. The second leg was held on 18 December at the Cairo Stadium in the presence of 80,000 spectators, with Al Ahly winning 2–0. Three days after the match, club legend Mahmoud El Khatib decided to retire after 17 years at the club, in a press conference attended by a large crowd of journalists.

=== Arab tournament success and boycotting CAF (1990–2005) ===
In 1992, Al Ahly won the Egypt Cup title by defeating the league champions Zamalek 2–1 in the final. After winning the cup for the third time in a row in 1993, Al Ahly returned to Africa by winning the African Cup Winners' Cup for the fourth time in its history in 1993, which was the last time the club participated in the tournament. Al Ahly defeated Africa Sports d'Abidjan in the final in Cairo Stadium after a 1–1 draw in the first leg. In the same season, the club won the Egypt Cup by beating Ghazl El Mahalla SC 3–2 in the final.

After three years without winning the league, Al Ahly won the league in the 1993–94 season under the management of Alan Harris after a strong competition with Ismaily SC, which was only decided by a playoff match in which the club won 4–3 in Alexandria.

Al Ahly participated in the Arab Championships for the first time in 1994 after a decision to boycott the African tournaments due to weak financial returns and complaints about the refereeing decisions in the 1994 CAF Super Cup. Al Ahly won the 1994 Arab Cup Winners' Cup by defeating Al Shabab in the final 1–0. After leading Al Ahly to their second consecutive league title and the Arab Super Cup in Morocco, Reiner Hollmann left Al Ahly at the end of 1997, after finishing second in the 1997 Arab Club Champions Cup in Tunisia. He was replaced by his countryman Rainer Zobel, who succeeded in winning the league championship for the fifth consecutive season in 1997–98 and winning the 1998 Arab Super Cup title with Zobel for the second successive season, beating MC Oran and Al-Shabab, and drawing with Club Africain. In 1998, Al Ahly returned to the African championships for the first time in six years.

In the summer of 2001, Al Ahly signed Manuel José to take on the leadership of the team, the first time in the club's history to have a Portuguese manager. Jose's first match with Al Ahly was a friendly against Real Madrid in August 2001, when Al Ahly stunned Madrid with a 1–0 win at the Cairo Stadium. This was the fourth time Al Ahly had defeated a European champion, the others being a 3–2 victory over Benfica in 1963, a 2–1 win against Bayern Munich in 1977, and a 3–0 win against Steaua București in 1986.

Al Ahly won the African Champions League title after a 4–1 on aggregate victory over Mamelodi Sundowns. The first leg was held on 8 December at the Loftus Versfeld Stadium in the South African capital Pretoria, and ended in a 1–1 draw. The second leg was held on 21 December at the Cairo International Stadium in the presence of 75,000 spectators, and ended with a 3–0 win for Al Ahly.

Al Ahly also won the 2002 CAF Super Cup with a 4–1 victory over Kaizer Chiefs F.C. in Cairo, in a match that saw Al Ahly's goalkeeper Essam El Hadary scoring his historic goal. Manuel Jose was unable to collect any local championships in his first term, although his team was able to achieve an emphatic 6–1 victory against the defending champion Zamalek in the league. At the end of the season, Jose was sacked and replaced by the Dutchman Johannes Bonfrere on a one-year contract, on a monthly salary of $18,000. The club's decision to sack Jose was not liked by the majority of the fans.

=== Golden era (2005–2013) ===
Al Ahly achieved victory in all the matches of the first 14 rounds of the 2004–05 Egyptian Premier League, to win the Premier League title for the 29th time in the club history and the first local championship for the Portuguese coach Manuel José who was rehired by the club. Al Ahly won the league by a record 31-point difference from Enppi, the closest competitor. It was the first time that a club won all their matches in the first half of a season since the league began in 1948.

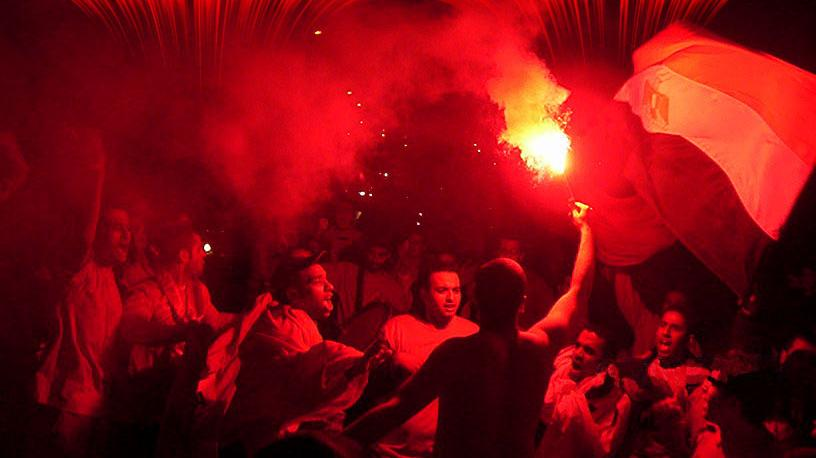
Al Ahly fans celebrating after winning the 2005 CAF Champions League

Al Ahly also won their second Egyptian Super Cup in July 2005 by defeating Enppi 1–0. At the end of 2005, the club clinched the CAF Champions League for the fourth time in their history after defeating Étoile du Sahel 3–0 in the final in Cairo. The first leg was played on 29 October at the Stade Olympique de Sousse, Tunisia, and ended 0–0. The second leg was played on 12 November at the Cairo Military Academy Stadium in the presence of 30,000 spectators, due to renovations at Cairo International Stadium in preparation for hosting the 2006 African Nations Cup. Al Ahly won 3–0, with goals scored by Mohamed Aboutrika, Osama Hosni, and Mohammed Barakat.

With their Champions League triumph, the team would go on to set an unprecedented record of going an entire season unbeaten in all competitions. 46 matches were played in the Egyptian Premier League, Egypt Cup, Egyptian Super Cup, and the CAF Champions League combined, with the club completing a quadruple winning all the aforementioned competitions. The club also set another record of not losing in 52 games in 852 days. Al Ahly made their first appearance at a FIFA Club World Cup in December 2005, but had an unsuccessful campaign as the team lost to Al-Ittihad in the first round and then lost the fifth-place match to Sydney FC.

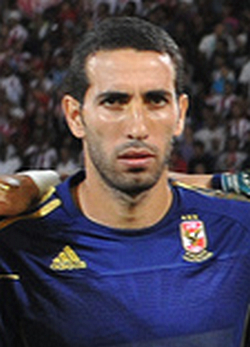
Mohamed Aboutrika, one of the club legends

The 2006–07 season was successful, starting with the Egyptian Super Cup for the second time with another win over Enppi, with a goal in the stoppage time. The club also won the league for the second time in a row. Al Ahly returned to the Egyptian Cup with a 3–0 win over Zamalek SC, achieving a domestic treble.

Al Ahly performed well in the CAF Super Cup by reaching the final against CS Sfaxien, drawing the first leg 1–1 in the Cairo Stadium. After the match, CS Sfaxien were considered favorites to win the cup. The second leg against CS Sfaxien ended in a 1–0 win for Al Ahly.

The club then participated in the 2006 FIFA Club World Cup in their second appearance. Al Ahly's participation this time was better compared to their previous one, as they defeated Auckland City FC in the quarter-final 2–0. The team played in the semi-finals against Brazilian club Internacional, losing 2–1. The club managed to achieve the bronze medal for the first time in African history by defeating Club América 2–1 in Yokohama.

Al Ahly played the 2007 CAF Super Cup on 18 February at the Addis Ababa Stadium as the champion of the 2006 CAF Champions League against the ES Sahel, the champion of the 2006 CAF Confederation Cup. Al Ahly suffered from many absentees at this stage due to injuries. However, the match went to penalties after the extra time ended with a goalless draw, which Al Ahly won 5–4 on shootout. After achieving the Super Cup title, the club equalled the record set by Zamalek with 3 Super Cup titles, before adding three other titles to set a new record. Al Ahly also set another record as the club with most participations in the African Super Cup (8 times).

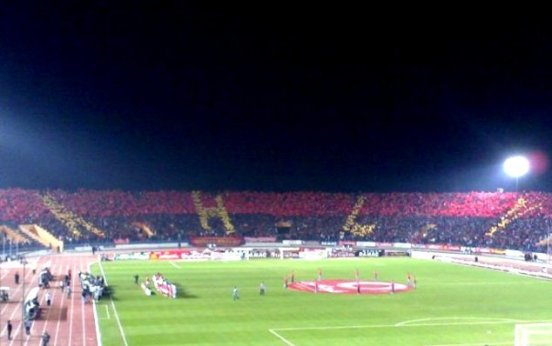
Ultras Ahlawy Tifo before Cairo derby in 2007–08 Egyptian Premier League

Al Ahly continued winning the league title, winning the Egyptian Premier League for the 4th consecutive time by 17 points away from Ismaily SC. The team also won the Super Cup for the fourth time in a row by beating Zamalek 2–0. It was the second victory in a week for Ahly over Zamalek after their meeting in the CAF Champions League a week earlier. Al Ahly won the CAF Champions league for the sixth time with a 4–2 win on aggregate over Coton Sport FC de Garoua in the final, after finishing the first leg with a 2–0 win and drawing in the second leg 2–2. The club set off for the Club World Cup again, but lost against C.F. Pachuca and Adelaide Football Club.

The club started the 2008–09 season winning the CAF Super Cup after defeating CS Sfaxien 2–1, before starting the race to the league's shield with Ismaily. The two teams played a playoff match to determine the champion, which Al Ahly won 1–0. It was the last championship for Manuel José during his second term before handing over the team's leadership to Hossam El-Badry. El Badry managed to keep the 2009–10 league shield in Al Ahly's cupboard to become the first national coach to win the league championship for the club in 23 years. Al Ahly won the Egyptian Super Cup by defeating Haras El Hodoud SC 1–0.

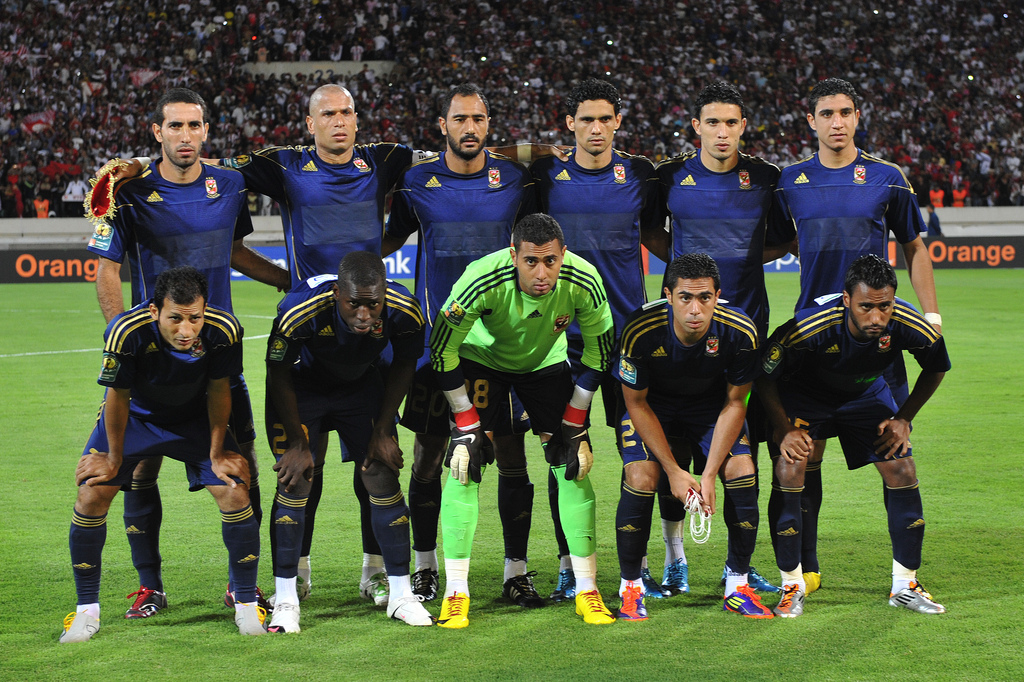
Al Ahly starting lineup in 2011

In the CAF Champions League, Al Ahly qualified for the semi-finals, but was knocked out by Espérance Sportive de Tunis due to a refereeing mistake by Joseph Lamptey that gave the hosts a win in the second leg.

The sports activity in Egypt was postponed because of the Port Said Stadium riot, which resulted in the deaths of 74 people including 72 Al Ahly fans and caused the injuries of more than 500 people. In the first match after the return of sports activity, Al Ahly won the Egyptian Super Cup after defeating Enppi 2–1, in a mourn-driven match at the empty stadium of Borg El Arab Stadium. Despite the difficult events, Al Ahly players overcame the circumstances and defeated Esperance in the 2012 CAF Champions League Final. The first leg finished 1–1 at the Borg El Arab Stadium. A 2–1 second leg victory to Al Ahly at the Stade Olympique de Radès added the seventh African champions title in the history of the club.

Al Ahly, led by Hossam el-Badri, achieved fourth place in the 2012 FIFA Club World Cup in Japan, with a victory in the first match against Sanfrecce Hiroshima 2–1. Al Ahly then lost 1–0 to the Copa Libertadores champion Corinthians, and then defeated by Monterrey 2–0 in the third-place deciding match.

Hossam el-Badri left the team to Mohamed Youssef, who lead Al Ahly to the 2013 CAF Champions League title for the eighth time by beating the South African club Orlando Pirates 2–0 in the second leg match, after a 1–1 draw in the first leg.

=== Mahmoud Taher era (2014–2017) ===
Al Ahly made their way to the African Confederations Cup after an early exit from the Champions League. Al Ahly reached the final against Séwé FC but lost the first leg 2–1. In the return match, the score was 0–0 until the sixth minute of stoppage time, when Al Ahly's Emad Moteab scored a goal with a header in the dying minutes which made coach Juan Carlos Garrido running with celebration onto the pitch. Garrido was later sacked after the club was eliminated from the CAF Champions League on penalties to Moghreb Tétouan.

Al Ahly's form declined after most of the stars of the older generation retired, resulting in losses in a number of tournaments. The team regained balance when they met Zamalek in the Super Cup held in Dubai for the first time at the end of 2015.

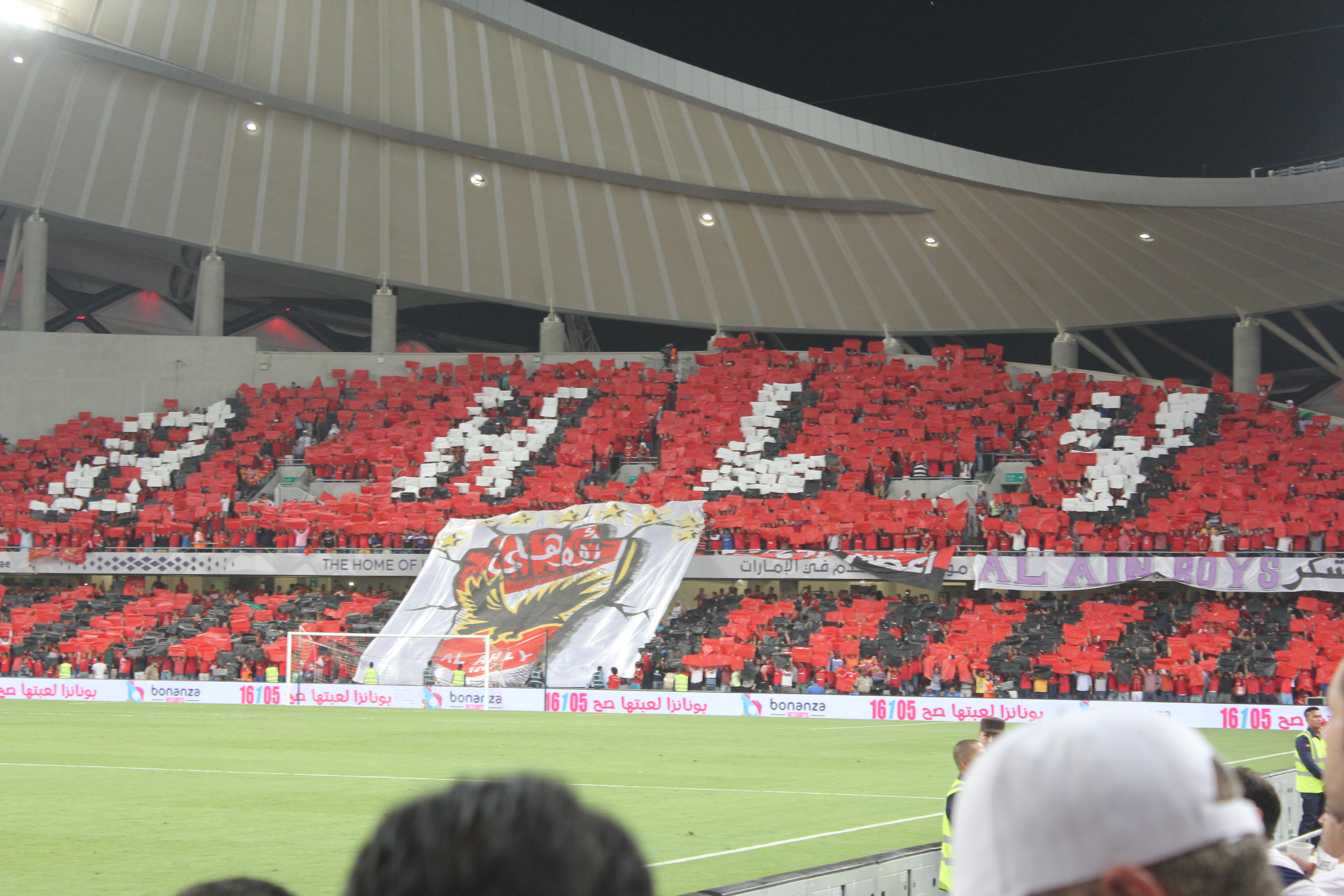
Al Ahly fans Tifo before the Egyptian Super Cup in 2015

Abdul-Aziz Abdul-Shafi led Al Ahly as a coach to a 3–2 win over Zamalek at the Hazza Bin Zayed Stadium to win the ninth Egyptian Super Cup in the club's history.

After not winning the 2014–15 league title, Al Ahly won the 2015–16 league with a seven-point difference between the defending champions Zamalek. Al Ahly finished the competition under the leadership of Dutchman Martin Jol, who replaced the Portuguese coach Jose Peseiro. Al Ahly won the league title for the 39th time in the club's history before the end of the league with four rounds. The team managed to go 39th games in a row unbeaten in all competitions, setting a record of 30 games unbeaten in the league, however Al Ahly reached the final of the 2016 Egypt Cup and lost to rival Zamalek SC in a 3–1 defeat, leading to Al Ahly failing to win their 36th Egypt Cup. Under the leadership of Hossam El-Badry, Al Ahly was able to keep a clean sheet in 30 games that season in all competitions.

The club then won the Egyptian Cup for the 36th time in its history after beating Al Masry 2–1 in extratime in the Egyptian Cup final at Borg El Arab Stadium.

Al Ahly reached the final of the 2017 CAF Champions League, drawing 1–1 with Wydad AC at Borg El Arab Stadium. Wydad later hosted Al Ahly at Stade Mohammed V in Casablanca, where Al Ahly was defeated 1–0 and failed to secure the 9th CAF Champions League trophy.

=== Mahmoud El Khatib era and return to African success (2017–) ===
On 1 December 2017, Mahmoud El Khatib was elected as the new club president. El-Khatib won the polls ahead of Mahmoud Taher with 20,956 votes. Taher, who had been president since 2014 until 2017, collected 13,182 votes. In the race of vice-presidency, former Egyptian sports minister El Amry Farouk won with 19,923 votes with Mustafa Fahmy receiving 14,269 votes.

Al Ahly won the Egyptian Super Cup title for the ten time in its history, after defeating Al Masry SC 1–0. The winning goal was scored by Walid Azaro in the 12th minute of the first extra half of the match, which gave Al Ahly the title, also making Walid the first Moroccan and foreigner to score in the tournament.

The next season, the club managed to clinch the Egyptian Premier League for the third consecutive season under the leadership of the manager Hossam El-Badry, and 40th in its history. Al Ahly officially won the title 6 weeks before the end of the championship, achieving the second fastest league in its history after the 2004–05 Egyptian Premier League season.

Al Ahly reached the 2018 CAF Champions League Final, but lost to Tunisian club Espérance Sportive de Tunis. Al Ahly won in the first leg 3–1, but Espérance Sportive de Tunis defeated Al Ahly 3–0 in the second leg with them win the 2018 CAF Champions League final.

On 9 April 2019, Al Ahly was knocked out of the 2018–19 CAF Champions League in the quarter-finals after suffering a 5–0 loss in the first leg to South Africa's Mameloudi Sundowns. In the second leg, Al Ahly won 1–0 but the score on aggregate was 5–1. This loss was the club's biggest loss since 1942 and in the CAF Champions League tournament. This loss resulted in the club's board deducting 10% of the players salary for a year. Many even criticized Martin Lasarte saying he was mostly responsible for the loss.

Al Ahly managed to win the 2018–19 Egyptian Premier League title for the fourth consecutive season and for the 41st in its history under the leadership of the Uruguayan manager Martín Lasarte, after defeating Al Mokawloon Al Arab 3–1. This result put Ahly five points clear of their rivals Zamalek with one game of the league season left. Al Ahly won the 2018–19 league title despite a rough start, as results eventually improved and winter signings helped with team performance. The 2018–19 league win raised the club trophies to 136, making Al Ahly the most crowned club in world football with 20 continental titles; nine Champions Leagues, one Confederation Cup, four Cup Winners' Cups, six Super Cups and one Afro-Asian Club Championship. As of 2019, Al Ahly has won CAF Champions League in 1982, 1987, 2001, 2005, 2006, 2008, 2012 and in 2013; making them the most crowned team in Africa.

On 31 August 2019, René Weiler was named the new coach of Al Ahly. Weiler replaced Martin Lasarte who was sacked despite guiding Al Ahly to win the league title with a game to spare. Weiler was able to win his first title with the club in less than one month as Al Ahly managed to win the Egyptian Super Cup for the 11th time in the club history after defeating Zamalek 3–2 on 20 September 2019 at the Borg El Arab Stadium. On 18 September, after Zamalek's loss to Aswan SC, Al Ahly won their 42nd Egyptian Premier League title in the 2019–20 season and was the second title for Weiler before leaving the club and being replaced by Pitso Mosimane. On 27 November, Al Ahly faced rival Zamalek in the 2020 CAF Champions League Final, winning 2–1. Magdy scored the winning goal for Al Ahly in the 86th minute to win Al Ahly's ninth CAF Champions League title and their first since 2013. About a week later, Al Ahly defeated Tala'ea El Gaish SC in the Egypt Cup final 3–2 on penalties. With this victory, Al Ahly won the treble for the third time in their history, and becoming the first African team to complete the continental treble three times.

With Al Ahly qualified for the 2020 FIFA Club World Cup, they defeated hosts Al-Duhail in the first match of the tournament, sending Al Ahly to its first official match with the European champions Bayern Munich in the Semi-finals. Bayern defeated Al Ahly 2–0. Al Ahly managed to secure the bronze medal for the second time in the club's history after defeating Palmeiras, the winners of the 2020 Copa Libertadores in the Third place play-off, becoming the first and only Arab or African team to have won two medals in the tournament.

On 28 May 2021, Al Ahly defeated RS Berkane 2–0 in the 2021 CAF Super Cup in Qatar, winning their 22nd continental title. On 17 July 2021, Al Ahly defeated Kaizer Chiefs 3–0 in the Champions League Final in Morocco, winning their tenth Champions League and 23rd continental title.

On 21 September 2021, Al Ahly lost the Egyptian Super Cup to Tala'ea El Gaish in a 3–2 defeat on penalties, This resulted in a disciplinary action by the club's board, deducting £E300,000 from the players, football director, and the entirety of the coaching staff salaries. The deduction was later lifted after Al Ahly beat Zamalek 5–3 in the Cairo derby on 5 November 2021.

On 22 December 2021, Al Ahly won its eighth CAF Super Cup after beating Raja CA 6–5 on penalties.

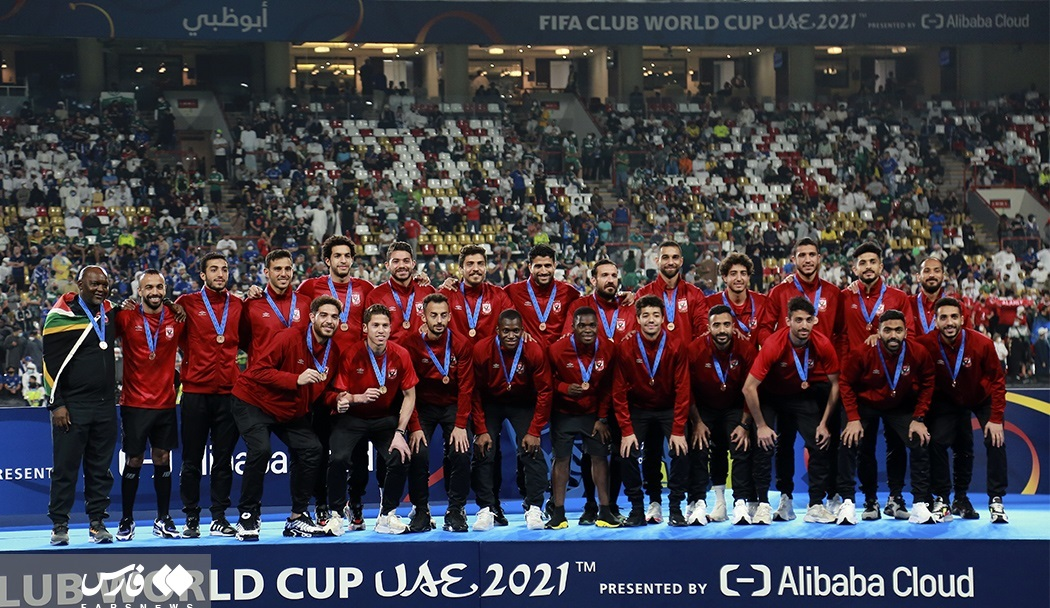
Al Ahly players with the 2021 FIFA Club World Cup bronze medals

Al Ahly qualified to the 2021 FIFA Club World Cup in the United Arab Emirates as the champions of Africa. Al Ahly won the first match 1–0 against the CONCACAF Champions League winners Monterrey of Mexico despite having many players missing due to injuries, along with some of the club's players participating with the Egyptian national football team in the 2021 Africa Cup of Nations. In the semi-final, Al Ahly lost against Palmeiras, the winners of the 2021 Copa Libertadores 2–0 to play against Al Hilal in the third place playoff match. Al Ahly achieved the third place in the FIFA Club World Cup for the third time in the club's history after defeating Al Hilal 4–0, the biggest victory for Al Ahly in the FIFA Club World Cup.

Al Ahly for the second time reached the CAF Champions League Final for the third time in a row under the management of Pitso Mosimane, after defeating Algerian side ES Sétif 6–2 on aggregate, but failed to win their 11th CAF Champions League trophy after losing 2–0 to Wydad AC.

On 13 June 2022, Mosimane parted ways with Al Ahly and Samy Koumsan took over the manager role as an interim manager. On 29 June 2022, Ricardo Soares replaced Pitso Mosimane as Al Ahly's manager. His debut with Al Ahly was against Petrojet in the Egypt Cup semi-final in which he led Al Ahly to a 2–0 victory to face rival Zamalek for the Egypt Cup Final, in which Al Ahly lost 2–1. This period witnessed a mass deterioration of Al Ahly, losing 3–2 to Smouha and Soares's league debut was a goalless draw with El Gouna, Al Ahly lost 2–0 to Pyramids in the league, drawing with Mokawloon Al Arab and drawing with Pharco. Al Ahly for the first time since the 1991–92 season was not in the top two of the Egyptian Premier League table as the club finished third place.

Following disappointing results during his time as manager, Ricardo Soares was sacked on 31 August 2022, just 2 months after he was appointed as Al Ahly's manager.

He was replaced by Marcel Koller who was appointed as Al Ahly's new manager on 9 September 2022. Marcel Koller won his first trophy after Al Ahly beat rival Zamalek in a 2–0 win for the Egyptian Super Cup.

Al Ahly under Marcel Koller beat Alexandria's based Smouha SC in a 3–1 win in the Egypt Cup semi-final to meet Pyramids FC in the final. A couple of weeks later, Al Ahly played Auckland City in the 2022 FIFA Club World Cup, where Al Ahly beat the New Zealand-based team in a 3–0 win to face off CONCACAF Champions League winners Seattle Sounders FC who were competing as the first MLS club to participate in the tournament and their first-ever match in the cup. Al Ahly achieved a late 1–0 victory and advanced to the semi-final to meet the UEFA Champions League winner Real Madrid. This would be the second time the two sides meet after Manuel Jose's 2001 debut with the club where he was able to beat Real Madrid 1–0 at the Cairo International Stadium. Al Ahly lost to Real Madrid and faced Flamengo for the third-place playoffs, when Al Ahly lost 4–2 and ended with the 4th place for the tournament.

Al Ahly won the 2021–22 Egypt Cup after beating Pyramids in the final, being the 38th Egypt Cup for the club. Al Ahly later won the 13th Egyptian Super Cup in its history after beating Pyramids FC 1–0 at the Mohammed bin Zayed Stadium in Abu Dhabi, United Arab Emirates.

On 11 June 2023, Al Ahly won the CAF Champions League after defeating the same team they lost against in the 2021–22 final, the Moroccan club Wydad AC after beating them 3–2 on aggregate in the final. The first match was played at the Cairo International Stadium on 4 June with Al Ahly winning 2–1, but drew with Wydad AC 1–1 at Stade Mohamed V. This gave Al Ahly its 11th CAF Champions League and qualified them for the 2023 FIFA Club World Cup and 2023 CAF Super Cup. A month later, on 10 July, Al Ahly achieved their 43rd Egyptian Premier League title. In the 2023–24 CAF Champions League, Al Ahly clinched their 12th title after a 1–0 win on aggregate over Espérance Sportive de Tunis in the final.

On 15 June 2025 Al Ahly FC and Inter Miami FC played to a 0–0 draw in the opening game of the 2025 FIFA Club World Cup in Miami Gardens, Florida, USA.

== Rivalries ==
=== Cairo derby ===
The Cairo Derby is a rivalry between Egyptian clubs Al Ahly and Zamalek SC. Both clubs are located in Greater Cairo, and their matches are considered the highlight of the football season with a live broadcast to most of the Middle Eastern and North African countries since the 1960s. Typically, the derby is played twice each season with two matches in the Egyptian Premier League, but it is not uncommon to find the teams meeting each other in the Egypt Cup, especially in the final, and in Africa's most prestigious club competition, the CAF Champions League.

=== Al Ahly–Pyramids rivalry ===
The Al Ahly–Pyramids rivalry is a football rivalry between Egyptian clubs Al Ahly and Pyramids FC. The rivalry developed following Pyramids’ relocation to Cairo and rebranding in 2018, as the two clubs increasingly competed for domestic honours. Their encounters have become notable fixtures in Egyptian football, particularly in the Egyptian Premier League and domestic cup competitions. The clubs have also faced each other in decisive matches for major domestic titles, including the Egypt Cup and the Egyptian Super Cup.

== Supporters ==
=== Ultras Ahlawy ===
Al Ahly has a large fanbase of ultras named Ultras Ahlawy (abbreviated UA07) which are known for their pyrotechnic displays. Ultras Ahlawy raised its banner for the first time at a match against ENPPI Club on 13 April 2007. Ultras Ahlawy also supports Al Ahly's basketball, volleyball, and handball teams. Ultras Ahlawy members include college graduates, workers, and youth from many social levels in Egypt. Their motto is "Together Forever", which is meant to highlight the connection between their members. pronunciation: A'zam Nady bel Koron).

=== Other supporting groups ===
Type of group	Name	Creation date
Ultras group	Ultras Ahlawy	13 April 2007–present
Ultras group	Ultras Devils	2007 (dissolution in 2015)
Fans Association	ALU	1996 (dissolution in 2005)
Fans Association	AFC	2005 (dissolution in 2007)

== Port Said Stadium riot ==
On 1 February 2012, a massive riot occurred at Port Said Stadium in Port Said, Egypt, following an Egyptian Premier League football match between Al-Masry and Al Ahly, following a 3–1 victory by Al-Masry. Al-Masry supporters violently attacked supporters of Al Ahly by trapping them inside the stadium and attacking them with clubs, stones, bottles, and fireworks. As a result, 72 supporters of Al Ahly were killed with more than 500 injured after thousands of Al-Masry spectators stormed the stadium stands and pitch. Many of the deaths were due to the police's refusal to open the stadium gates. Members of Ultras Ahlawy claim that the supporters were specifically targeted because of their highly televised calls for the Supreme Council of the Armed Forces to step down, as well as their open mockery of the previous regime and the Supreme Council of the Armed Forces.

== Anthem ==
"Arise, Al Ahly" is the club's official anthem written by the journalist Fekry Abaza in 1957 and composed by Umm Kulthum's husband Mahmoud Sherif. It was influenced by the anthem of the Egyptian Revolution of 1919 "Arise Egyptian". The lyrics of the anthem are as follows:

Arise, Al Ahly, see your sons and the soldiers
see your Battalions, see your soldiers and the crowdsSee the signs of victory through all the generations
see and record the glories of immortality in themYou are always you are always always on the top
Every blessing in your life is with us
and that is the will of our Lord
From your elders we gained our glory
and with your youth we kept our name
You are always you are always always on the top

== Grounds ==
=== Mokhtar El-Tetsh Stadium (training ground) ===
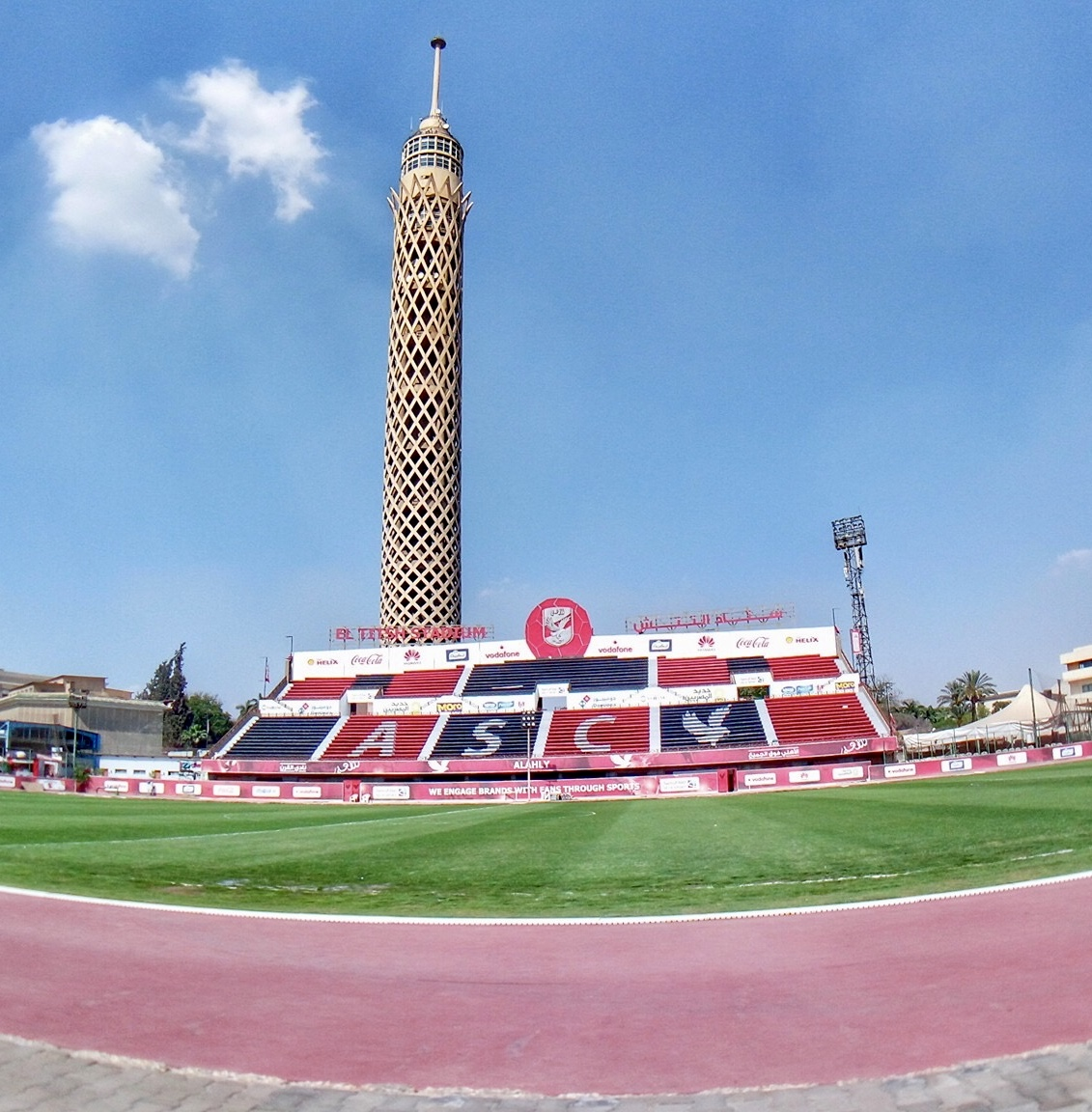
Cairo Tower behind Mokhtar El-Tetsh Stadium

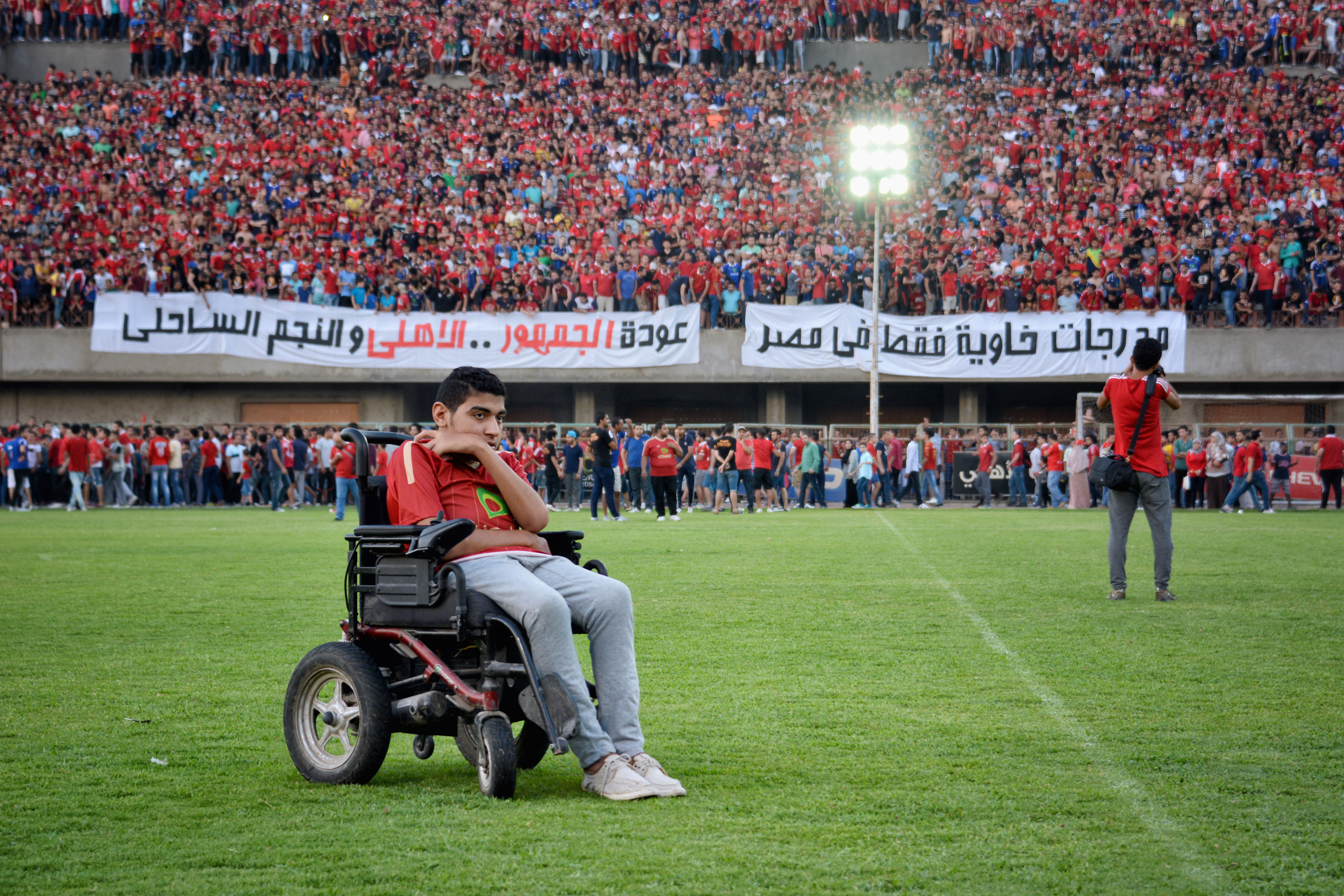
Al Ahly fans supporting the team in Mokhtar El-Tetsh Stadium

The club was originally founded for students of higher schools to meet and practice political dialogues. The club prompted Al Ahly to build its first stadium in 1909 and was called "Al-Hawsh" at the time, a colloquial word from the Egyptian dialect meaning "the courtyard" in Arabic. The stadium was developed over the years to become known as Mokhtar El-Tetsh Stadium. In 1929, the stadium was named after Egypt's prince at that time, the Prince Farouk Stadium. By 1956, light stands were added to the stadium. The stadium was later renamed to the Mokhtar El-Tetsh Stadium, after Mokhtar El-Tetsh, a legend of the club. Al Ahly continued to play their home games at Mokhtar El-Tetsh Stadium until the Cairo International Stadium was opened. Currently, the stadium holds the team training and friendly games.

=== Cairo International Stadium ===
Al Ahly formerly played their home games at their own ground, Mokhtar El Tetsh Stadium, but its capacity was too small for the club's supporters. As a way of solving the issue, Mokhtar El Tetsh Stadium became the official training ground, and Cairo International Stadium replaced it as the official home ground. From 2014 to 2017, Al Ahly stopped playing their home games at the Cairo International Stadium due to security reasons. In the 2016–17 season, Al Ahly played most of their home games at Al Salam Stadium and played their matches in the African competitions at Borg El Arab Stadium. At the first leg of the Egyptian Premier League 2017–18 season, Al Ahly returned to Cairo International Stadium as its official home ground.

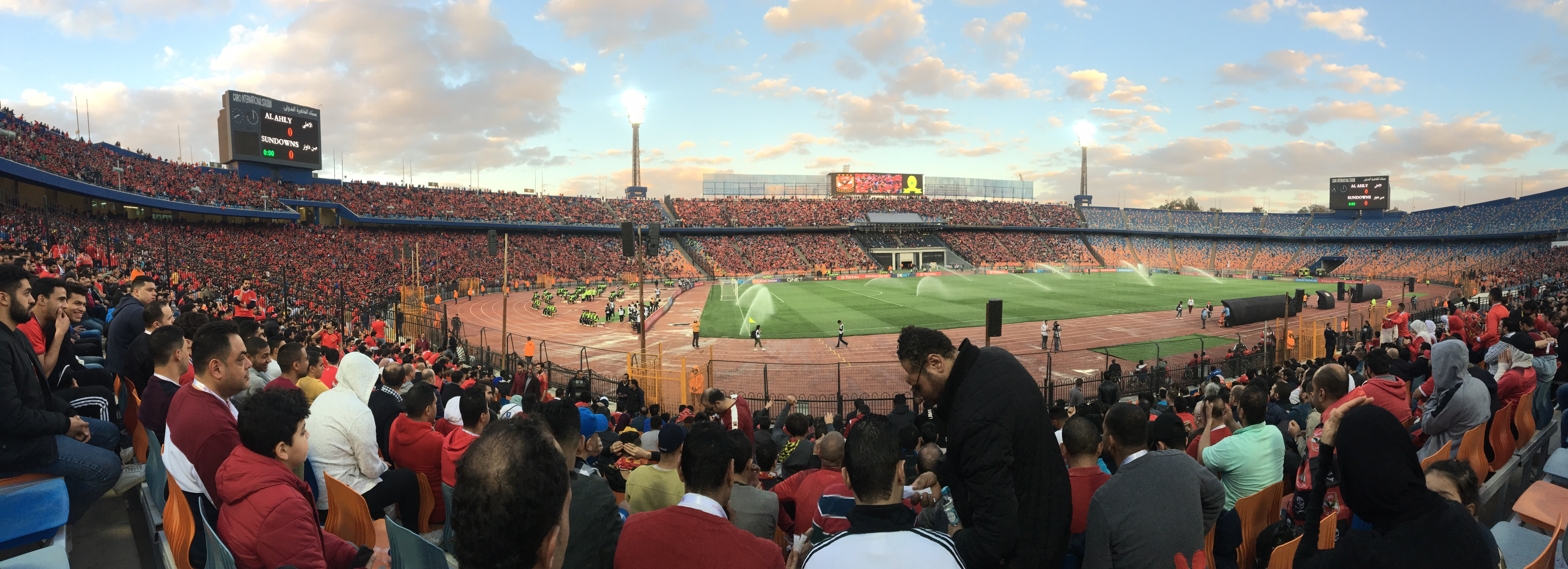
Panorama of Cairo International Stadium before the kick-off of Al Ahly vs Mamelodi Sundowns match in the 2019–20 CAF Champions League

=== Al Ahly Stadium ===
On 14 February 2025, Al Ahly have taken a monumental leap toward realizing their long-awaited vision with the official launch of the "Project of the Century", a sprawling sports city in Sheikh Zayed, west of Cairo, during Friday's FIFA Club World Cup trophy ceremony. It would include:

- a 42,000 seated to maximize fan proximity to the pitch, aligning with global standards.
- specialized facilities: a sports hospital, museum chronicling the club legacy, a sports university, a youth academy, and a hotel.

In July 2026, Al Ahly announced a landmark sponsorship agreement with Vodafone Egypt, granting the company the naming rights to the stadium, which will be commercially known as Vodafone Stadium.

==== Phased construction ====
Phase one will prioritize the stadium and hotel, while phase two introduces the university, hospital, and auxiliary training pitches.

Egyptian financial heavyweight Beltone Leasing & Factoring has committed EGP 4 billion (USD 80 million) to the project, with developer Al Qalaa Al Hamraa for Facilities Management securing additional funding to meet the total estimated cost of EGP 8–9 billion.

The stadium’s final design was unveiled at a high-profile ceremony in Luxor’s Hatshepsut Temple, attended by club dignitaries and partners.

The event also served as a prelude to Ahly's upcoming participation in the 2025 FIFA Club World Cup.

Construction began in February 2025, and is expected to complete by 2029.

== Media ==
Al Ahly TV is an Egyptian-Arab channel that broadcasts the football team's friendly matches, youth team matches and other sports matches. The channel was established in 2008, in cooperation with Arab Radio and Television Network. The official broadcast of the channel was launched on 3 December 2010 when former club president Hassan Hamdy announced the opening of the channel.

Al Ahly also has a YouTube channel that had over 1.16 million subscribers as of September 2023. Training videos, exclusive features, and match highlights are frequently published on the channel. On 22 January 2021, the YouTube channel released a documentary called Secret of the 9th, which reached one million views in less than one day.

In addition, the club has its own weekly magazine which covers the club's various news.

Al Ahly lead the top six most popular football clubs on social media from Africa on 12 October 2022:

#	Football club	Country	Followers
1	Al-Ahly	Egypt	33 million
2	Zamalek	Egypt	13 million
3	Raja CA	Morocco	7 million
4	Kaizer Chiefs	South Africa	6 million
5	Orlando Pirates	South Africa	4 million
6	Simba SC	Tanzania	4 million

== Kits and crest ==
On 3 November 1917, Mohamed Sherif Sabri Bek (who was the uncle of King Farouk I) became a member of the club and designed the first logo of Al Ahly. It was inspired by the Egyptian flag ("Sultanate of Egypt" at that time which was red and white) and had a crown that represented Egypt's royal rule. In 1952, following the July Revolution and the change of ruling regime from Monarchy to Republic, the crown was removed, and replaced with the word "Nady" which means club in arabic. The logo remained unchanged until 2007, when it had slight changes celebrating the club's centenary. In late 2018, a 4th star was added on the top of the badge after Al Ahly's 40th league title. Al Ahly's crest was voted "the second most beautiful in the game" in a 2020 poll by Spanish newspaper Marca.

Evolution of the crest of Al Ahly SC

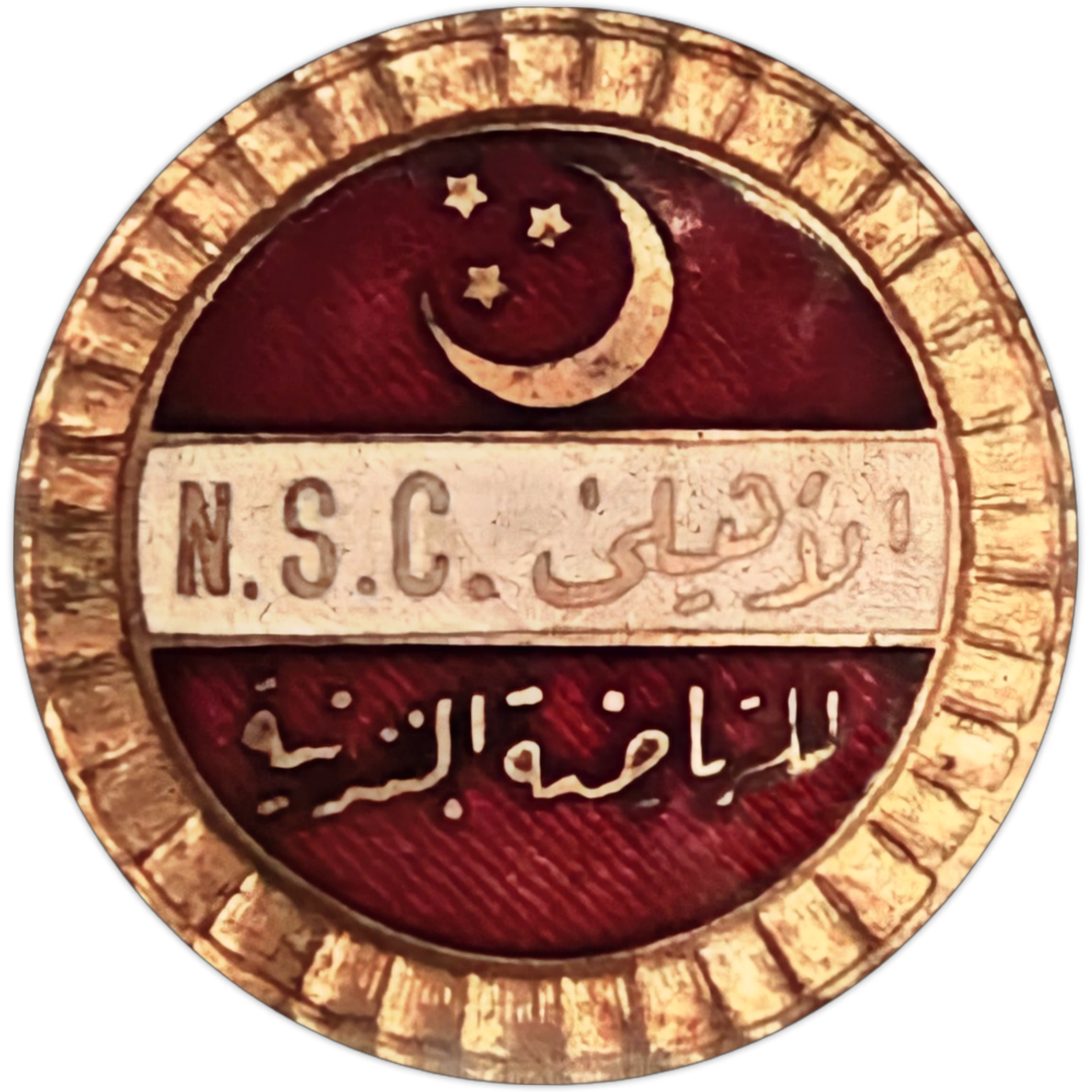
1907–1917

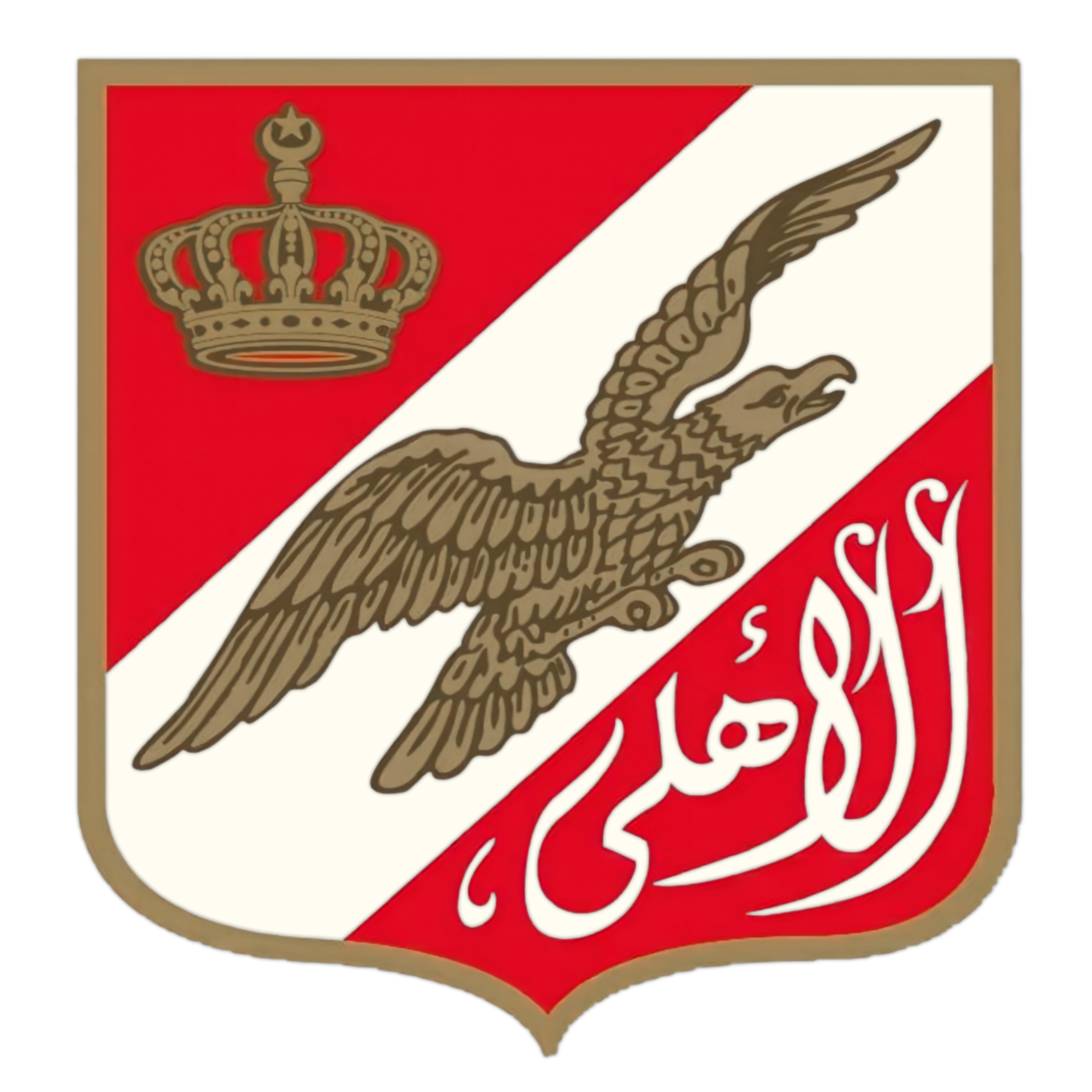
1917–1952

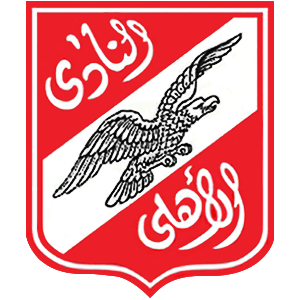
1952–2007

Football club kit crest
2023–

Al Ahly's kit has traditionally always been identified with a red shirt, white shorts, and red socks.

Classic

=== Kit suppliers and shirt sponsors ===
Period	Kit manufacturer	Shirt sponsor
1978–1979	Umbro	Mansour Group
1979–1980	Umbro	Old Spice
1980–1983	Puma	Helwan For Import & Export
1983–1989	Puma	Coca-Cola
1989–1993	Umbro	Coca-Cola
1993–2000	Adidas	Coca-Cola
2000–2001	Nike	Coca-Cola
2002	Nike	Vodafone
2002–2009	Puma	Vodafone
2009–2011	Adidas	Vodafone
2011–2014	Adidas	Etisalat
2014–2015	Sporta	Etisalat
2015–2018	Sporta	Vodafone
2018–2022	Umbro	WE
2022–	Adidas	e&

2005–08 Home	2012–14 Away	2016–17 Home	2017–18 Away	2019–20 Home	2021–22 Away	2022–23 Home

== Honours ==
Type	Competition	Titles	Seasons
Domestic	Egyptian Premier League	45	1948–49, 1949–50, 1950–51, 1952–53, 1953–54, 1955–56, 1956–57, 1957–58, 1958–59, 1960–61, 1961–62, 1974–75, 1975–76, 1976–77, 1978–79, 1979–80, 1980–81, 1981–82, 1984–85, 1985–86, 1986–87, 1988–89, 1993–94, 1994–95, 1995–96, 1996–97, 1997–98, 1998–99, 1999–2000, 2004–05, 2005–06, 2006–07, 2007–08, 2008–09, 2009–10, 2010–11, 2013–14, 2015–16, 2016–17, 2017–18, 2018–19, 2019–20, 2022–23, 2023–24, 2024–25
Domestic	Egypt Cup	39	1923–24, 1924–25, 1926–27, 1927–28, 1929–30, 1930–31, 1936–37, 1939–40, 1941–42, 1942–43, 1944–45, 1945–46, 1946–47, 1948–49, 1949–50, 1950–51, 1952–53, 1955–56, 1957–58, 1960–61, 1965–66, 1977–78, 1980–81, 1982–83, 1983–84, 1984–85, 1988–89, 1990–91, 1991–92, 1992–93, 1995–96, 2000–01, 2002–03, 2005–06, 2006–07, 2016–17, 2019–20, 2021–22, 2022–23
Domestic	Egyptian Super Cup	16	2003, 2005, 2006, 2007, 2008, 2010, 2011, 2014, 2015, 2018, 2019, 2021, 2022, 2023, 2024, 2025
Domestic	Sultan Hussein Cup	7	1922–23, 1924–25, 1925–26, 1926–27, 1928–29, 1930–31, 1937–38
Domestic	Egyptian Club Champions Cup	1	1990
Domestic	Cairo League	17	1924–25, 1926–27, 1927–28, 1928–29, 1930–31, 1934–35, 1935–36, 1936–37, 1937–38, 1938–39, 1941–42, 1942–43, 1945–46, 1947–48, 1949–50, 1953–54, 1957–58
Domestic	United Arab Republic Cup	1	1961
Continental	CAF Champions League	12	1982, 1987, 2001, 2005, 2006, 2008, 2012, 2013, 2019–20, 2020–21, 2022–23, 2023–24
Continental	African Cup Winners' Cup	4	1984, 1985, 1986, 1993
Continental	CAF Confederation Cup	1	2014
Continental	CAF Super Cup	8	2002, 2006, 2007, 2009, 2013, 2014, 2021, 2021
Intercontinental	FIFA African–Asian–Pacific Cup	1	2024
Intercontinental	Afro-Asian Club Championship	1	1988
Subregional	Arab Club Champions Cup	1	1996
Subregional	Arab Cup Winners' Cup	1	1994
Subregional	Arab Super Cup	2	1997, 1998

- Record
- Shared record

=== Awards and recognitions ===
- CAF Club of the 20th Century: 2001
- FIFA Club World Cup bronze medal (4): 2006, 2020, 2021, 2023
- African Inter-Club Team of the Year (7): 2005, 2006, 2008, 2012, 2013, 2023, 2024
- Globe soccer Top Titles Winners in the Middle East: 2020
- Globe Soccer for The Best Middle East Club: : 2023
- First place in the monthly international rankings of football history and strength (2): June 2006, July 2007
- Certificate of Conformity to International Standards (ISO 9001:2015): 2020

== Seasons ==
=== Recent seasons ===
Season	League										Egypt Cup	Egyptian Super Cup	Continental / other		CAF Super Cup	FIFA Club World Cup
Season	League	Position	Pld	W	D	L	GF	GA	GD	Pts	Egypt Cup	Egyptian Super Cup	Continental / other		CAF Super Cup	FIFA Club World Cup
2019–20	EPL	1st	34	28	5	1	74	8	+66	89	Winner	Runner-up	CAF Champions League	Winner	DNQ	DNQ
2020–21	EPL	2nd	34	22	10	2	72	29	+43	76	Runner-up	Runner-up	CAF Champions League	Winner	Winner	3rd
2021–22	EPL	3rd	34	20	10	4	62	21	+41	70	Winner	Winner	CAF Champions League	Runner-up	Winner	3rd
2022–23	EPL	1st	34	25	8	1	63	13	+50	83	Winner	Winner	CAF Champions League	Winner	DNQ	4th
2023–24	EPL	1st	34	27	4	3	75	28	+47	85	Withdrew	Winner	CAF Champions League	Winner	Runner-up	3rd

=== Domestic and continental competitions ===
Egyptian and CAF top-division Clubs Competitions
Year	Premier League	Egypt Cup	Egyptian League Cup	Egyptian Super Cup	Champions League	CAF Super Cup
1921–22	Started in 1948	-	Started in 2022	Started in 2001	Started in 1964	Started in 1992
1922–23	Started in 1948	-	Started in 2022	Started in 2001	Started in 1964	Started in 1992
1923–24	Started in 1948	Winner	Started in 2022	Started in 2001	Started in 1964	Started in 1992
1924–25	Started in 1948	Winner	Started in 2022	Started in 2001	Started in 1964	Started in 1992
1925–26	Started in 1948	Runner-up	Started in 2022	Started in 2001	Started in 1964	Started in 1992
1926–27	Started in 1948	Winner	Started in 2022	Started in 2001	Started in 1964	Started in 1992
1927–28	Started in 1948	Winner	Started in 2022	Started in 2001	Started in 1964	Started in 1992
1928–29	Started in 1948	-	Started in 2022	Started in 2001	Started in 1964	Started in 1992
1929–30	Started in 1948	Winner	Started in 2022	Started in 2001	Started in 1964	Started in 1992
1930–31	Started in 1948	Winner	Started in 2022	Started in 2001	Started in 1964	Started in 1992
1931–32	Started in 1948	-	Started in 2022	Started in 2001	Started in 1964	Started in 1992
1932–33	Started in 1948	-	Started in 2022	Started in 2001	Started in 1964	Started in 1992
1933–34	Started in 1948	-	Started in 2022	Started in 2001	Started in 1964	Started in 1992
1934–35	Started in 1948	Runner-up	Started in 2022	Started in 2001	Started in 1964	Started in 1992
1935–36	Started in 1948	-	Started in 2022	Started in 2001	Started in 1964	Started in 1992
1936–37	Started in 1948	Winner	Started in 2022	Started in 2001	Started in 1964	Started in 1992
1937–38	Started in 1948	-	Started in 2022	Started in 2001	Started in 1964	Started in 1992
1938–39	Started in 1948	-	Started in 2022	Started in 2001	Started in 1964	Started in 1992
1939–40	Started in 1948	Winner	Started in 2022	Started in 2001	Started in 1964	Started in 1992
1940–41	Started in 1948	Runner-up	Started in 2022	Started in 2001	Started in 1964	Started in 1992
1941–42	Started in 1948	Winner	Started in 2022	Started in 2001	Started in 1964	Started in 1992
1942–43	Started in 1948	Winner	Started in 2022	Started in 2001	Started in 1964	Started in 1992
1943–44	Started in 1948	Runner-up	Started in 2022	Started in 2001	Started in 1964	Started in 1992
1944–45	Started in 1948	Winner	Started in 2022	Started in 2001	Started in 1964	Started in 1992
1945–46	Started in 1948	Winner	Started in 2022	Started in 2001	Started in 1964	Started in 1992
1946–47	Started in 1948	Winner	Started in 2022	Started in 2001	Started in 1964	Started in 1992
1947–48	Started in 1948	-	Started in 2022	Started in 2001	Started in 1964	Started in 1992
1948–49	Winner	Winner	Started in 2022	Started in 2001	Started in 1964	Started in 1992
1949–50	Winner	Winner	Started in 2022	Started in 2001	Started in 1964	Started in 1992
1950–51	Winner	Winner	Started in 2022	Started in 2001	Started in 1964	Started in 1992
1951–52	not held	Runner-up	Started in 2022	Started in 2001	Started in 1964	Started in 1992
1952–53	Winner	Winner	Started in 2022	Started in 2001	Started in 1964	Started in 1992
1953–54	Winner	-	Started in 2022	Started in 2001	Started in 1964	Started in 1992
1954–55	not finished	-	Started in 2022	Started in 2001	Started in 1964	Started in 1992
1955–56	Winner	Winner	Started in 2022	Started in 2001	Started in 1964	Started in 1992
1956–57	Winner	-	Started in 2022	Started in 2001	Started in 1964	Started in 1992
1957–58	Winner	Winner	Started in 2022	Started in 2001	Started in 1964	Started in 1992
1958–59	Winner	Runner-up	Started in 2022	Started in 2001	Started in 1964	Started in 1992
1959–60	Third place	Winner	Started in 2022	Started in 2001	Started in 1964	Started in 1992
1960–61	Winner	-	Started in 2022	Started in 2001	Started in 1964	Started in 1992
1961–62	Winner	-	Started in 2022	Started in 2001	Started in 1964	Started in 1992
1962–63	Third place	-	Started in 2022	Started in 2001	Started in 1964	Started in 1992
1963–64	Fifth place	-	Started in 2022	Started in 2001	Started in 1964	Started in 1992
1964–65	Fourth place	-	Started in 2022	Started in 2001	did not enter	Started in 1992
1965–66	Sixth place	Winner	Started in 2022	Started in 2001	did not enter	Started in 1992
1966–67	Runner-up	-	Started in 2022	Started in 2001	did not enter	Started in 1992
1968–69	not held	not held	Started in 2022	Started in 2001	did not enter	Started in 1992
1969–70	not held	not held	Started in 2022	Started in 2001	did not enter	Started in 1992
1970–71	not finished	not held	Started in 2022	Started in 2001	did not enter	Started in 1992
1971–72	not held	not held	Started in 2022	Started in 2001	did not enter	Started in 1992
1972–73	Fourth place	Runner-up	Started in 2022	Started in 2001	did not enter	Started in 1992
1973–74	not finished	not finished	Started in 2022	Started in 2001	did not enter	Started in 1992
1974–75	Winner	-	Started in 2022	Started in 2001	did not enter	Started in 1992
1975–76	Winner	Runner-up	Started in 2022	Started in 2001	Round of 16	Started in 1992
1976–77	Winner	-	Started in 2022	Started in 2001	Quarter-final	Started in 1992
1977–78	Runner-up	Winner	Started in 2022	Started in 2001	Round of 16	Started in 1992
1978–79	Winner	-	Started in 2022	Started in 2001	did not enter	Started in 1992
1979–80	Winner	not held	Started in 2022	Started in 2001	did not enter	Started in 1992
1980–81	Winner	Winner	Started in 2022	Started in 2001	Semi-final	Started in 1992
1981–82	Winner	not finished	Started in 2022	Started in 2001	Winner	Started in 1992
1982–83	Third place	Winner	Started in 2022	Started in 2001	Runner-up	Started in 1992
1983–84	Runner-up	Winner	Started in 2022	Started in 2001	did not enter	Started in 1992
1984–85	Winner	Winner	Started in 2022	Started in 2001	did not enter	Started in 1992
1985–86	Winner	-	Started in 2022	Started in 2001	did not enter	Started in 1992
1986–87	Winner	not held	Started in 2022	Started in 2001	Winner	Started in 1992
1987–88	Runner-up	-	Started in 2022	Started in 2001	Semi-final	Started in 1992
1988–89	Winner	Winner	Started in 2022	Started in 2001	did not enter	Started in 1992
1989–90	not finished	-	Started in 2022	Started in 2001	Round of 16	Started in 1992
1990–91	Runner-up	Winner	Started in 2022	Started in 2001	Quarter-final	Started in 1992
1991–92	Fourth place	Winner	Started in 2022	Started in 2001	did not enter	did not enter
1992–93	Runner-up	Winner	Started in 2022	Started in 2001	did not enter	Runner-up
1993–94	Winner	not held	Started in 2022	Started in 2001	did not enter	did not enter
1994–95	Winner	-	Started in 2022	Started in 2001	Withdrew	did not enter
1995–96	Winner	Winner	Started in 2022	Started in 2001	Withdrew	did not enter
1996–97	Winner	Runner-up	Started in 2022	Started in 2001	Withdrew	did not enter
1997–98	Winner	Semi-final	Started in 2022	Started in 2001	Round of 32	did not enter
1998–99	Winner	Round of 32	Started in 2022	Started in 2001	Group stage	did not enter
1999–2000	Winner	Semi-final	Started in 2022	Started in 2001	Group stage	did not enter
2000–01	Runner-up	Winner	Started in 2022	Withdrew	Winner	Winner
2001–02	Runner-up	Round of 16	Started in 2022	did not enter	Group stage	did not enter
2002–03	Runner-up	Winner	Started in 2022	Winner	did not enter	did not enter
2003–04	Runner-up	Runner-up	Started in 2022	did not enter	Round of 32	did not enter
2004–05	Winner	Round of 16	Started in 2022	Winner	Winner	Winner
2005–06	Winner	Winner	Started in 2022	Winner	Winner	Winner
2006–07	Winner	Winner	Started in 2022	Winner	Runner-up	did not enter
2007–08	Winner	Round of 32	Started in 2022	Winner	Winner	Winner
2008–09	Winner	Round of 16	Started in 2022	Runner-up	Round of 16	did not enter
2009–10	Winner	Runner-up	Started in 2022	Winner	Semi-final	did not enter
2010–11	Winner	Round of 16	Started in 2022	Winner	Group stage	did not enter
2011–12	not finished	not held	Started in 2022	not held	Winner	Winner
2012–13	not finished	Withdrew	Started in 2022	not held	Winner	Winner
2013–14	Winner	Semi-final	Started in 2022	Winner	Round of 16	Runner-up
2014–15	Runner-up	Runner-up	Started in 2022	Winner	Round of 16	did not enter
2015–16	Winner	Runner-up	Started in 2022	Runner-up	Group stage	did not enter
2016–17	Winner	Winner	Started in 2022	Winner	Runner-up	did not enter
2017–18	Winner	Quarter-final	Started in 2022	Winner	Runner-up	did not enter
2018–19	Winner	Round of 16	Started in 2022	Runner-up	Quarter-final	did not enter
2019–20	Winner	Winner	Started in 2022	Runner-up	Winner	Winner
2020–21	Runner-up	Runner-up	Started in 2022	Winner	Winner	Winner
2021–22	Third place	Winner	Group stage	Winner	Runner-up	did not enter
2022–23	Winner	Winner	Withdrew	Winner	Winner	Runner-up
2023–24	Winner	Withdrew	Withdrew	Winner	Winner	Runner-up
2024–25	Winner	did not enter	Group stage	Winner	Semi-final	did not enter
2025–26	Third place	Round of 32	Group stage	TBD	Quarter-final	did not enter
2026–27	TBD	TBD	TBD	TBD	did not enter	TBD

=== CAF overall ranking of African clubs ===
CAF ranking of the 21st century
Rank	Club	Points
1	(Egypt) Al Ahly	121
2	(Tunisia) Espérance Tunis	72
3	(Democratic Republic of the Congo) TP Mazembe	67.5
4	(Tunisia) Étoile du Sahel	58
5	(Morocco) Wydad	51
6	(Egypt) Zamalek	45
7	(Morocco) Raja Casablanca	38
8	(South Africa) Mamelodi Sundowns	37
9	(Nigeria) Enyimba	31
10	(Tunisia) CS Sfaxien	31

CAF ranking of the 20th century
Rank	Club	Points
1	(Egypt) Al Ahly	40
2	(Egypt) Zamalek	37
3	(Ghana) Asante Kotoko	34
4	(Cameroon) Canon Yaoundé	34
5	(Tunisia) Espérance Tunis	27
6	(Ivory Coast) ASEC Mimosas	27
7	(Ghana) Hearts of Oak	26
8	(Ivory Coast) Africa Sports	25
9	(Algeria) JS Kabylie	22
10	(Democratic Republic of the Congo) TP Mazembe	20

=== CAF 5-year ranking ===
The club ranking for the 2026–27 CAF Champions League and the 2026–27 CAF Confederation Cup is to be based on results from each CAF club competition from the 2021–22 to the 2025–26 seasons.

Rank	Club	2021–22 (× 1)	2022–23 (× 2)	2023–24 (× 3)	2024–25 (× 4)	2025–26 (× 5)	Total
1	(South Africa) Mamelodi Sundowns	3	4	4	5	6	73
2	(Egypt) Al Ahly	5	6	6	4	3	66
3	(Tunisia) Espérance de Tunis	3	4	5	3	4	58
4	(Morocco) RS Berkane	5	0	4	5	4	57
5	(Algeria) USM Alger	0	5	3	2	5	52
6	(Egypt) Zamalek	2	2	5	2	4	49
7	(Egypt) Pyramids	2	2	1	6	3	48
8	(Morocco) ASFAR Rabat	0	2	0	3	5	41
9	(Sudan) Al-Hilal	2	2	2	3	3	39
10	(Algeria) CR Belouizdad	3	3	2	2	3	38

== Players ==
=== Current squad ===
As of 22 August 2026

Note: Flags indicate national team as defined under FIFA eligibility rules; some limited exceptions apply. Players may hold more than one non-FIFA nationality.

No.	Pos.	Nation	Player
1	GK	EGY	Mohamed El Shenawy (captain)
2	DF	EGY	Yassin Marei
3	DF	MAR	Achraf Dari
4	DF	EGY	Ahmed Eid
5	DF	EGY	Hady Reyad
6	DF	EGY	Yasser Ibrahim
7	FW	EGY	Taher Mohamed
8	MF	EGY	Ahmed Reda
9	FW	MAR	Soufiane Benjdida
10	FW	ALG	Monsef Bakrar
11	DF	EGY	Karim El Debes
12	MF	EGY	Akram Tawfik
13	MF	EGY	Marwan Attia
14	FW	EGY	Hussein El Shahat
15	MF	EGY	Omar El Saaiy
17	FW	MAR	Achraf Bencharki
18	FW	EGY	Omar Moawad
19	FW	EGY	Afsha

No.	Pos.	Nation	Player
20	DF	MAR	Youssef Belammari
21	MF	EGY	Ali Mahmoud
22	MF	EGY	Emam Ashour
24	DF	EGY	Tawfik Mohamed
25	FW	EGY	Zizo
26	DF	EGY	Amr El Gazar
27	FW	EGY	Aqtay Abdallah
28	FW	EGY	Karim Fouad
29	FW	MAR	Reda Slim
30	DF	EGY	Mohamed Hany (vice-captain)
31	GK	EGY	Mostafa Shobeir
32	FW	EGY	Mohamed Raafat
33	GK	EGY	Hamza Alaa
34	MF	EGY	Kabaka
36	MF	EGY	Ahmed Nabil Koka
38	FW	EGY	Mohamed Abdallah
39	FW	EGY	Mahmoud Salah
49	DF	EGY	Ibrahim El Asyuti

=== Youth Academy ===
Note: Flags indicate national team as defined under FIFA eligibility rules; some limited exceptions apply. Players may hold more than one non-FIFA nationality.

No.	Pos.	Nation	Player
—	GK	EGY	Yassin Hatem
—	DF	EGY	Hamza El Degawy
—	DF	EGY	Mohanad El Shamy

No.	Pos.	Nation	Player
—	MF	NGR	Kazeem Ibrahima
—	FW	EGY	Omar El Adawy
—	FW	EGY	Abdelrahman Mano

=== Out on loan ===
As of 27 August 2026

Note: Flags indicate national team as defined under FIFA eligibility rules; some limited exceptions apply. Players may hold more than one non-FIFA nationality.

No.	Pos.	Nation	Player
—	FW	SLO	Nejc Gradišar (at Cleopatra until 30 June 2027)
—	FW	EGY	Mohamed Sherif (at Al-Zawraa until 30 June 2027)

No.	Pos.	Nation	Player
—	MF	EGY	Ibrahim Adel (at Al Mokawloon Al Arab until 30 June 2027)
—	GK	EGY	Mohamed Seha (at Al Masry until 30 June 2027)

=== Notable players ===
- (Egypt) Mokhtar El Tetsh
- (Egypt) Saleh Selim
- (Egypt) El-Sayed El-Dhizui
- (Egypt) Ahmed Mekkawi
- (Egypt) El Sayed Ateya (Toto)
- (Egypt) Saleh El Wahsh
- (Egypt) Mahmoud El-Gohary
- (Egypt) Rifaat El-Fanagily
- (Egypt) Mimi El-Sherbini
- (Egypt) Taha Ismail
- (Egypt) Mahmoud El Khatib
- (Egypt) Mostafa Abdou
- (Egypt) Rabie Yassin
- (Egypt) Zakaria Nassef
- (Egypt) Taher Abouzeid
- (Egypt) Thabet El-Batal
- (Egypt) Ekramy
- (Egypt) Fathi Mabrouk
- (Egypt) Khaled Gadallah
- (Egypt) Osama Orabi
- (Egypt) Alaa Mayhoub
- (Egypt) Hossam Hassan
- (Egypt) Ibrahim Hassan
- (Egypt) Ahmed Shobair
- (Egypt) Ayman Shawky
- (Egypt) Mohamed Ramadan
- (Egypt) Walid Salah El-Din
- (Egypt) Hady Khashaba
- (Ghana) Felix Aboagye
- (Egypt) Ahmed Belal
- (Egypt) Yasser Rayyan
- (Egypt) Mohamed Abdelwahab
- (Egypt) Mohamed Aboutrika
- (Egypt) Essam El Hadary
- (Egypt) Shady Mohamed
- (Angola) Gilberto
- (Angola) Flávio Amado
- (Egypt) Wael Gomaa
- (Egypt) Hossam Ashour
- (Egypt) Hossam Ghaly
- (Egypt) Mohamed Barakat
- (Egypt) Ahmed Hassan
- (Egypt) Sayed Moawad
- (Egypt) Mohamed Shawky
- (Egypt) Emad Moteab
- (Egypt) Ahmed Fathy
- (Egypt) Mahmoud Trezeguet
- (Egypt) Moamen Zakaria
- (Egypt) Walid Soliman
- (Egypt) Ahmed Hegazi
- (Egypt) Mohamed El Shenawy
- (Tunisia) Ali Maâloul
- (Egypt) Amr Elsolia
- (Nigeria) Junior Ajayi
- (Egypt) Mohamed Sherif
- (South Africa) Percy Tau
- (Egypt) Mohamed Abdelmonem
- (Palestine) Wessam Abou Ali
- (Egypt) Ramy Rabia
- (Mali) Aliou Dieng
- (Egypt) Emam Ashour
- (Egypt) Hamza Abdelkarim

== Coaching staff ==
Coaching staff
(Morocco) Hussein Ammouta	Head coach
(Egypt) Yasser Radwan	Assistant coach
(Morocco) Hichame Zahid	Assistant coach
(Morocco) Issam Armoum	Conditioning Coach
(Netherlands) Joey Potveer	Goalkeeping coach
Analysis department
(Morocco) Othmane Manekoudi	Head Analyst
(Morocco) Khalil Aghchmi	Video Analyst
Fitness coaches
(Brazil) Renato Buscariolli	Fitness coach
Medical department
(Egypt) Ahmed Gaballah	Team doctor
(Egypt) Hany Wahba	Team doctor
(Egypt) Mohamed Wafaay	Physiotherapist
(Egypt) Ahmed Abou El-Wafa	Psychologist
Sport management and organisation
(Egypt) Wael Gomaa	Football Director
(Egypt) Mokhtar Mokhtar	Head of Football Planning Committee
(Egypt) Zakaria Nassef	Member of Football Planning Committee
(Egypt) Khaled Bebo	Coordinator for Youth, Academy and Women's Football
(Egypt) Walid Soliman	Head of Youth Football
(Egypt) Badr Ragab	Youth Academy General Manager

== Board of directors ==
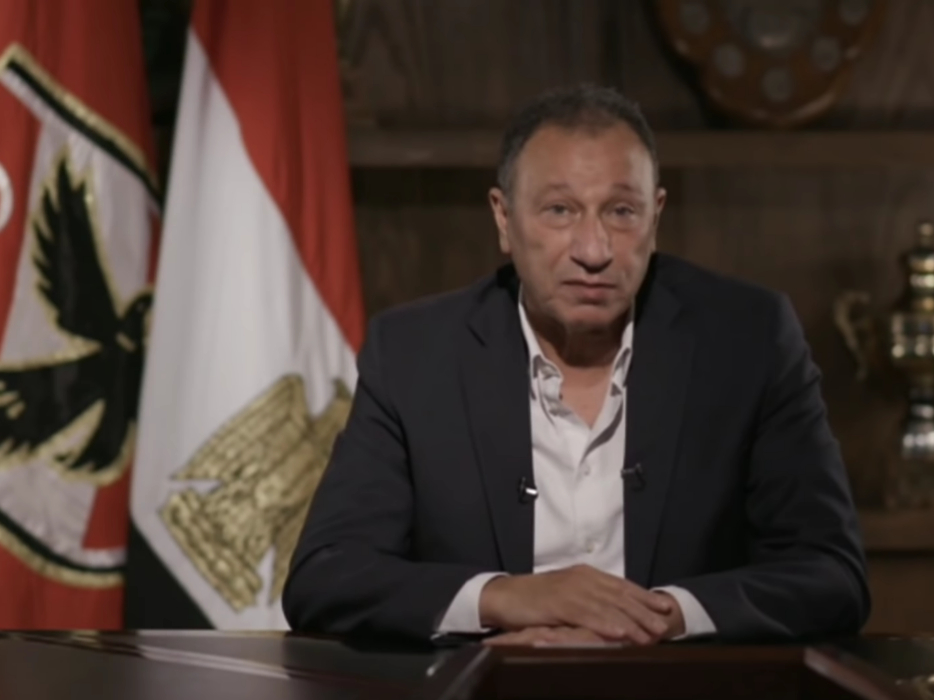
Mahmoud El Khatib, Al Ahly's current president

Office	Name
President	(Egypt) Mahmoud El Khatib
Vice President	(Egypt) Yasseen Mansour
Secretary of the fund	(Egypt) Khaled Mortagy
Board Member	(Egypt) Mohamed Shawky
Board Member	(Egypt) Mai Atef
Board Member	(Egypt) Tarek Kandil
Board Member	(Egypt) Mohamed Al-Ghazawy
Board Member	(Egypt) Mohamed Al-Damaty
Board Member	(Egypt) Mohamed Serag
Board Member	(Egypt) Mohamed El-Garhy

== Club figures ==
=== Presidents ===
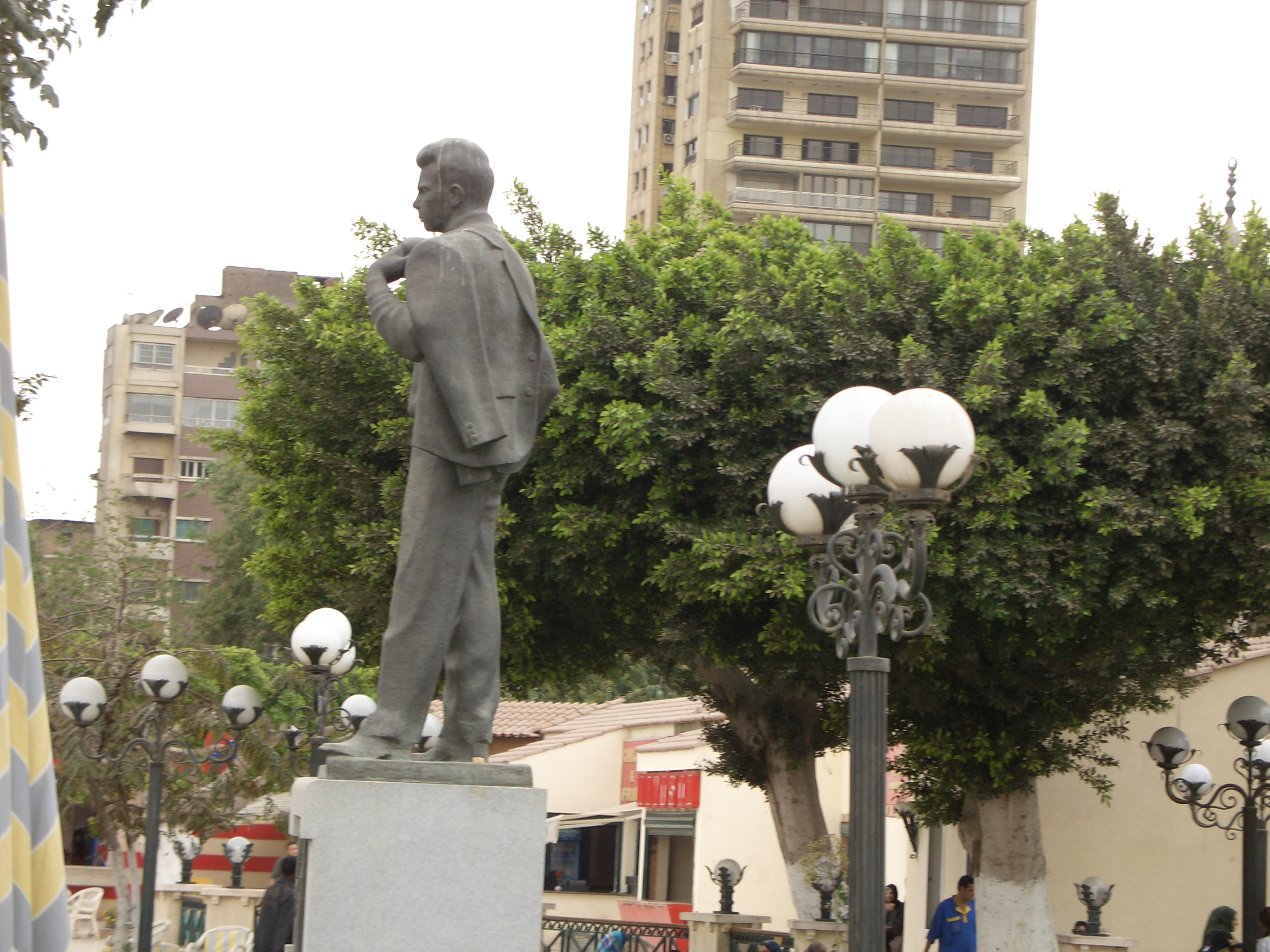
Statue of Saleh Selim, former player and president in the club's headquarters

No	Tenure	Name	From	To
1	1st	(United Kingdom) Alfred Mitchell-Innes	1907	1908
2	1st	(Egypt) Aziz Ezzat Pacha	1908	1916
3	1st	(Egypt) Abdelkhaleq Tharwat Pacha	1916	1924
4	1st	(Egypt) Gaafar Waly Pacha	1924	1940
5	1st	(Egypt) Mohamed Taher Pacha	1940	1941
6	2nd	(Egypt) Gaafar Waly Pacha	1941	1944
7	1st	(Egypt) Ahmed Hasanein Pacha	1944	1946
8	1st	(Egypt) Ahmed Aboud Pacha	1946	1961
9	1st	(Egypt) Salah Dessouki	1961	1965
10	1st	(Egypt) Abdelmohsen Kamel Mortagy	1965	1967
11	1st	(Egypt) Ibrahim El Wakil	1967	1972
12	2nd	(Egypt) Abdelmohsen Kamel Mortagy	1972	1980
13	1st	(Egypt) Saleh Selim	1980	1988
14	1st	(Egypt) Saleh El Wahsh	1988	1992
15	2nd	(Egypt) Saleh Selim	1992	2002
16	1st	(Egypt) Hassan Hamdy	2002	2014
17	1st	(Egypt) Mahmoud Taher	2014	2017
18	1st	(Egypt) Mahmoud El Khatib	2017	Present

=== Captains ===
Throughout its history, Al Ahly has had 48 club captains, the first captain was Ahmed Fouad Anwar.
Mohamed El Shenawy is the current captain since 2020.

No.	Name
1	(Egypt) Ahmed Fouad Anwar
2	(Egypt) Hussein Hegazi
3	(Egypt) Riyad Shawki
4	(Egypt) Ali El-Hassani
5	(Egypt) Mahmoud Mokhtar El-Tetch
6	(Egypt) Mohamed Ali Rasmi
7	(Egypt) Ahmed Soliman
8	(Egypt) Amin Shoa'air
9	(Egypt) Moustafa Kamel Mansour
10	(Egypt) Saleh El-Sawwaf
11	(Egypt) Hussein Madkour
12	(Egypt) Mohamed El-Guindi
13	(Egypt) Ahmed Mekawi
14	(Egypt) Abdel Galil Hemaida
15	(Egypt) Saleh Selim
16	(Egypt) Rifaat El-Fanagily
17	(Egypt) Taha Ismail
18	(Egypt) Mimi El-Sherbini
19	(Egypt) Essam Abdel Monem
20	(Egypt) Hany Moustafa
21	(Egypt) Anwar Salama
22	(Egypt) Hassan Hamdy
23	(Egypt) Mustafa Younis
24	(Egypt) Moustafa Abdou
25	(Egypt) Mahmoud El-Khateeb
26	(Egypt) Thabet El-Batal
27	(Egypt) Taher Abouzaid
28	(Egypt) Rabie Yassin
29	(Egypt) Magdi Abdelghani
30	(Egypt) Ahmed Shobair
31	(Egypt) Osama Orabi
32	(Egypt) Hossam Hassan
33	(Egypt) Walid Salah El-Din
34	(Egypt) Hady Khashaba
35	(Egypt) Sayed Abdel Hafeez
36	(Egypt) Essam El Hadary
37	(Egypt) Shady Mohamed
38	(Egypt) Ahmed Belal
39	(Egypt) Osama Hosny
40	(Egypt) Ahmad El-Sayed
41	(Egypt) Wael Gomaa
42	(Egypt) Mohamed Aboutrika
43	(Egypt) Hossam Ghaly
44	(Egypt) Emad Moteab
45	(Egypt) Hossam Ashour
46	(Egypt) Sherif Ekramy
47	(Egypt) Ahmed Fathy
48	(Egypt) Mohamed El Shenawy

== See also ==
- Al Ahly FC Women
- Al Ahly (basketball)
- Al Ahly (handball)
- Al Ahly (men's volleyball)
