= 2005 Egyptian Super Cup =

2005–06 Egyptian Super Cup
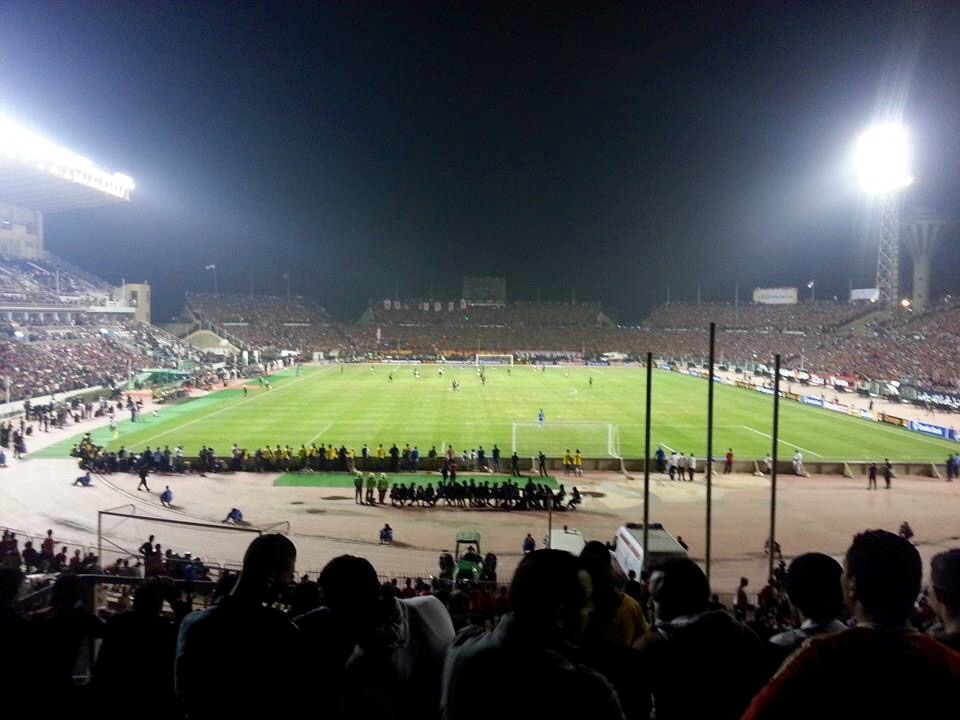
- Osman Ahmad Osman Stadium hosted the match
Al Ahly	ENPPI
1	0
- After extra time
- Date: 27 July 2005
- Venue: Osman Ahmed Osman Stadium, Cairo
- Referee: Abdel Fatah (Egypt)

The 2005–06 Egyptian Super Cup was the fifth edition of the Egyptian Super Cup, an annual football match between the winners of the previous season's Egyptian Premier League and Egypt Cup. The match is usually contested by the winners of the Premier League and the Egypt Cup, Al Ahly won the 2004–05 Egyptian Premier League and ENPPI won the 2004–05 Egypt Cup. The match was played at the Osman Ahmed Osman Stadium in Cairo. Al Ahly won the match 1–0 at extra time, after the match finished 0–0 after 90 minutes.

== Details ==
27 July 2005

Al Ahly	1–0 (a.e.t.)	ENPPI
Wael Gomaa 93'

Osman Ahmed Osman Stadium, Cairo
Referee: Abdel Fatah (Egypt)

GK	1	(Egypt) Essam El Hadary
CB	26	(Egypt) Wael Gomaa
CB	4	(Egypt) Emad El Nahhas
CB	5	(Egypt) Ahmad El-Sayed
LWB	12	(Angola) Gilberto	Booked	(substituted off) 105'
CM	14	(Egypt) Hassan Mostafa	Booked
CM	17	(Egypt) Mohamed Shawky	Booked
RWB	2	(Egypt) Islam El-Shater		(substituted off) 75'
AM	22	(Egypt) Mohamed Aboutrika		(substituted off) 63'
FW	9	(Egypt) Emad Moteab
FW	23	(Angola) Flávio Amado
Substitutes:
MF	8	(Egypt) Mohamed Barakat		(substituted in) 63'
AM	10	(Egypt) Wael Riad		(substituted in) 75'
FW	7	(Egypt) Shady Mohamed		(substituted in) 105'
Manager:
(Portugal) Manuel José

GK	16	(Egypt) Mostafa Kamal
LB	3	(Egypt) Osama Hassan	Booked
CB	15	(Egypt) Mohamed Younis	Booked Sent off (straight red)
SW	8	(Egypt) Amr Abdo	Booked
CB		(Egypt) Amr Fahim	Booked
RB	30	(Egypt) Ayman Said
CM	12	(Egypt) Samir Sabry
CM	4	(Egypt) Mohamed Thabet	Booked	(substituted off) 65'
CM	29	(Nigeria) Ghazali Mohamed		(substituted off) 60'
FW		(Egypt) Amr Zaki
FW	17	(Egypt) Magdy Abd El Aatey		(substituted off) 95'
Substitutes:
CM		(Egypt) Hamada Shanah		(substituted in) 60'
CM		(Egypt) Reda Shehata		(substituted in) 65'
MF	9	(Egypt) Abdelhamid Hassan		(substituted in) 95'
Manager:
(Egypt) Taha Basry

Match rules

- 90 minutes.
- 30 minutes of extra time if necessary.
- Penalty shoot-out if scores still level.
- Seven named substitutes, of which up to three may be used.
