= 1951–52 Al Ahly SC season =

Al Ahly
1951–52 season
- Chairman: Ahmed Aboud Pacha
- Stadium: Al-Hawsh
- Egypt Cup: Runner-up
- Cairo League: Runner-up

The 1951–52 Al Ahly SC season was to be a football contest in Egypt.

The 1951–52 league championship was cancelled due to the revolution of 1952 and to allow the national team to prepare for the 1952 Summer Olympics. However, the Egypt Cup and the Cairo League were played normally. Al Ahly lost both tournaments to Zamalek.

== Competitions ==
=== Overview ===
Competition	Starting round	Final position	Record							
Competition	Starting round	Final position	Pld	W	D	L	GF	GA	GD	Win %
Cairo League	Matchday 1	Runners-up	6	2	2	2	8	5	+3	33.33
Egypt Cup	Round of 16	Runners-up	4	3	0	1	4	3	+1	75.00
Total			10	5	2	3	12	8	+4	50.00

Source: Competitions

== Cairo Zone League ==
Cairo league champion was decided by results of Cairo teams in national league with no separate matches for Cairo league competition.

=== Table ===
==== League table ====
Pos	Club	Pld	W	D	L	F	A	Pts
1	Zamalek(C)	6	3	3	0	14	9	9
2	Al-Ahly	6	2	2	2	8	5	6
3	Tersana	6	3	0	3	11	12	6
4	El Sekka El Hadid	6	1	1	4	10	17	3

(C)= Champions, Pld = Matches played; W = Matches won; D = Matches drawn; L = Matches lost; F = Goals for; A = Goals against; Pts = Points
Source: ^{[usurped]}.

=== Matches ===
Opponent	Venue	Result	Scorers
Tersana	A	1–2	
El Sekka El Hadid	H	2–0	
Zamalek	A	1–1	Hussein Madkour
Tersana	H	0–1	
El Sekka El Hadid	A	3–0	Wageeh Moustafa (2), Fouad Sedki
Zamalek	H	1–1	Wageeh Moustafa

== Egypt Cup ==
=== First round ===
Team 1	Score	Team 2
Al Ahly	1–0	El Qanah

=== Quarter-final ===
Team 1	Score	Team 2
Al Ahly	1–0	El Sekka El Hadid

=== Semi-final ===
Team 1	Score	Team 2
Al Ahly	2–1	Ismaily

=== Final ===
11 May 1952

Zamalek	2–0	Al Ahly
Sherif El-Far 8', 86'
