= 1953–54 Al Ahly SC season =

Al Ahly
1952–53 season
- Chairman: Ahmed Aboud Pacha
- Stadium: Al-Hawsh
- Egyptian Premier League: Winners
- Egypt Cup: Semi Final
- Top goalscorer: Toto (10 goals)

The 1953–54 Al Ahly SC season was the

Al Ahly entered the league as the defending 1952–53 champions They experienced and recovered well well after a three match winless start and won their 5th consecutive and 5th overall Egyptian Premier League title in the club's history. In the cup they were eliminated from the semifinal by Al Masry.

== Competitions ==
=== Overview ===
Competition	Starting round	Final position	Record							
Competition	Starting round	Final position	Pld	W	D	L	GF	GA	GD	Win %
Egyptian Premier League	Matchday 1	Winners	18	11	4	3	44	27	+17	61.11
Egypt Cup	Quarter Final	Semi Final	3	2	0	1	7	4	+3	66.67
Total			21	13	4	4	51	31	+20	61.90

Source: Competitions

=== Egyptian Premier League ===
==== League table ====
Pos	Club	Pld	W	D	L	F	A	Pts
1	Al Ahly (C)	18	11	4	3	44	27	26
2	Zamalek	18	9	6	3	34	22	24
3	Tersana SC	18	10	1	7	54	27	21
4	Ismaily SC	18	7	4	7	27	28	18
5	Al Masry	18	5	7	6	23	27	17
6	Al Ittihad	18	5	7	6	27	34	17
7	El Qanah	18	7	2	9	30	30	16
8	Teram	18	6	4	8	25	33	16
9	Olympic	18	5	3	10	33	48	13
10	El Sekka El Hadid (R)	18	4	4	10	17	38	12

(C)= Champions, (R)= Relegated, Pld = Matches played; W = Matches won; D = Matches drawn; L = Matches lost; F = Goals for; A = Goals against; ± = Goal difference; Pts = Points.

=== Matches ===
Opponent	Venue	Result	Scorers
Ismaily	A	2–0	
Al Ittihad	A	2–2	Sayed Osman, Fouad Sedki
Teram	H	1–2	Ahmed Mekkawi
Tersana	H	3–1	Toto, Sherif El-Guindi, Kaddoura
Al Masry	H	1–1	Sayed Osman
Olympic	H	5–0	El-Nahhas (2), Toto, Kaddoura, Wageeh Moustafa
Zamalek	A	1–1	Ahmed Mekkawi
El Qanah	H	4–3	Toto (2), Sokrat, Ahmed Mekkawi
El Sekka El Hadid	H	3–2	Ahmed Mekkawi, Toto, Wageeh Moustafa
Ismaily	H	1–0	Ahmed Mekkawi
Tersana	A	3–1	Helmi Aboul Maaty
Al Masry	H	3–2	Helmi Aboul Maaty, Toto (2)
Olympic	A	3–3	Fathi Khattab (2), Wageeh Moustafa
El Sekka El Hadid	H	3–1	Wageeh Moustafa, Fathi Khattab, El Zohairy
Zamalek	H	4–2	Toto (3), Ahmed Mekkawi
Al Ittihad	H	5–0	Wageeh Moustafa, Ahmed Mekkawi (3), Sayed Saleh
El Qanah	A	1–2	Fathi Khattab, Fouad Sedki
Teram	A	1–2	Fahmi Gemaei, Fouad Sedki

== Egypt Cup ==
Date	Round	Opponent	Venue	Result	Scorers
26 May 1954	FR	Olympic	H	3–0	Toto, Wageeh Moustafa, ??
30 May 1954	QF	El Qanah	H	3–2	Fahmi Gema'ei, Ahmed Mekkawi, Fathi Khattab
6 June 1954	SF	Al Masry	H	3–1	Ahmed Mekkawi
