= Hany Moustafa =

Egyptian footballer and manager (1947–2023)

Personal information
- Date of birth: 27 October 1947
- Place of birth: Shubra, Kingdom of Egypt
- Date of death: 5 May 2023 (aged 75)
- Position: Defender

Youth career
- 1961–1965: Al Ahly

Senior career*
Years	Team	Apps	(Gls)
1965–1977	Al Ahly		
1969	→ Ismaily (loan)		

International career
1968–1976	Egypt	42	(0)
1972	Africa	4	(0)

Managerial career
- 1981: Egypt U20
- 1990: Egypt
Medal record
Men's football
Representing Egypt
All-Africa Games
Bronze medal – third place	1973 Nigeria
- * Club domestic league appearances and goals

Hany Moustafa (Arabic: هاني مصطفى; 27 October 1947 – 5 May 2023) was an Egyptian footballer and manager who played as a defender.

== Early life and club career ==
Moustafa began to play football at school in Ismailia, where he caught the attention of Al Ahly, joining their under-14 team as a right winger. In 1965, he was promoted to Al Ahly's first team at the age of 18, with manager Fouad Sedki switching him from a right winger to a defender. Following the suspension of sports after the Six-Day War, Ismaily requested to sign him on loan for the 1969 African Cup of Champions Clubs, which he helped them win. Later in his career, he served as the captain of both Al Ahly and the Egypt national team.

He was named Egyptian Footballer of the Year in 1971, and three years later, he finished fourth in the African Footballer of the Year. In 2007, the Confederation of African Football included Moustafa in their list of the best 200 African footballers of the last 50 years. In October 2021, the IFFHS included him in their men's all-time Egypt dream team.

== International career ==
Between 1968 and 1976, Moustafa made 42 appearances for the Egypt national team, representing them at the 1970 and 1974 African Cup of Nations, as well as the 1971 Mediterranean Games and 1973 All-Africa Games.

In 1972, he was chosen as one of two Egyptian players, alongside Hassan Shehata, to represent an African side at the Brazil Independence Cup, where he played four matches.

== Managerial career ==
Following his retirement, Moustafa became a coach, where he studied in West Germany. In 1981, he was the manager of Egypt's under-20 national team at that year's FIFA World Youth Championship, where he helped them reach the quarter-finals. Later, he served as an assistant manager with Egypt under Fouad Sedki in 1988.

During the 1980s, Moustafa also served as a football director at Al-Ahly. He also worked as a lecturer for the Confederation of African Football.

In 1990, Moustafa was the manager of the Egypt national team at the 1990 African Cup of Nations in Algeria, where he lost all three matches.

== Personal life and death ==
Moustafa died on 5 May 2023, at the age of 75, following a long battle with illness.
