= 2002 CAF Super Cup =

Al Ahly	Kaizer Chiefs
(Egypt)	(South Africa)
4	1
- Date: 15 March 2002
- Venue: Cairo Stadium, Cairo
- Referee: Abdel Hakim Shelmani (Libya)

The 2002 CAF Super Cup was the tenth CAF Super Cup, an annual football match in Africa organized by the Confederation of African Football (CAF), between the winners of the previous season's two CAF club competitions, the African Cup of Champions Clubs and the African Cup Winners' Cup.

The match took place on 15 March 2002, on Cairo International Stadium in Cairo, Egypt, between Al Ahly, the 2001 CAF Champions League winner, and Kaizer Chiefs, the 2001 African Cup Winners' Cup winner. Al-Ahly won the match 4–1 to get his first title.

== Teams ==
Team	Qualification	Previous participation (bold indicates winners)
(Egypt) Al Ahly	2001 CAF Champions League winner	1994
(South Africa) Kaizer Chiefs	2001 African Cup Winners' Cup winner	None

== Match details ==
15 March 2002
18:00 UTC+2

Al Ahly (Egypt)	4-2	(South Africa) Kaizer Chiefs
Bebo 7'; Ghaly 30'; El-Hadary 65'; Sayed 69'	Report	Nzama 20'

Cairo International Stadium, Cairo
Referee: Abdel Hakim Shelmani (Libya)

**Al-Ahly**	**Kaizer Chiefs**

GK	1	(Egypt) Essam El-Hadary
RB	6	(Egypt) Sayed Abdel Hafeez
CB	26	(Egypt) Wael Gomaa
CB	20	(Egypt) Hady Khashaba
CB	5	(Egypt) Ahmad El-Sayed
LB	11	(Egypt) Ahmed Abou Moslem		(substituted off) 81'
RM	14	(Egypt) Hossam Ghaly	(yellow card) ?'
CM	13	(Egypt) Adel Mostafa
LM	12	(Angola) Sebastião Gilberto		(substituted off) 46'
CF	9	(Egypt) Khaled Bebo
CF	24	(Egypt) Reda Shehata		(substituted off) 84'
Substitutes:
CM	4	(Egypt) Ibrahim Said		(substituted on) 46'
LB	7	(Egypt) Shady Mohamed		(substituted on) 81'
CF	10	(Egypt) Walid Salah El-Din		(substituted on) 84'
Manager:
(Portugal) Manuel José de Jesus

GK	(South Africa) Brian Baloyi
CB	(Malawi) Patrick Mabedi
CB	(South Africa) Isaac Mabotsa
CB	(South Africa) Cyril Nzama
RM	(Mozambique) Jossias Macamo	(substituted off) 50'
CM	(South Africa) Thabo Mooki
CM	(South Africa) Jabu Mahlangu Pule
LM	(South Africa) Arthur Zwane
CM	(South Africa) Stanton Fredericks	(substituted off) 67'
CF	(South Africa) Mmthembu
CF	(South Africa) Shaun Permall	(substituted off) 60'
Substitutes:
MF	(South Africa) René Richards	(substituted on) 50'
MF	(South Africa) Goali Sithole	(substituted on) 60'
FW	(South Africa) Doctor Khumalo	(substituted on) 67'
Manager:
(Turkey) Muhsin Ertuğral
