= Ahmad El-Sayed =

Egyptian footballer (born 1980)

Ahmed El Sayed
Personal information
- Full name: Ahmed Mohamed El Sayed Moussa
- Date of birth: 13 October 1980 (age 46)
- Place of birth: Sharqia, Egypt
- Height: 1.81 m (5 ft 11 in)
- Position: Centre back

Youth career
- Al Ahly

Senior career*
Years	Team	Apps	(Gls)
2000–2012	Al Ahly	197	(4)
2012–2013	Telephonat Beni Suef	5	(0)
2013–2015	Misr Lel Makkasa	42	(1)
2015–2017	Al Ittihad	26	(1)

International career
2004–2009	Egypt	8	(0)
Medal record
Men's football
Representing Egypt
Africa Cup of Nations
Winner	2006 Egypt
- * Club domestic league appearances and goals

Ahmed Mohamed El Sayed Moussa (Arabic: أحمد محمد السيد موسى; born 13 October 1980) is an Egyptian retired professional footballer who played as a centre back.

== Honours and achievements ==
=== Club ===
Al Ahly

- Egyptian Premier League: 2004–05, 2005–06, 2006–07, 2007–08, 2008–19, 2009–10, 2010–11
- Egypt Cup: 2001, 2003, 2006, 2007
- Egyptian Super Cup: 2003, 2005, 2006, 2007, 2008, 2010
- CAF Champions League: 2001, 2005, 2006, 2008
- CAF Super Cup: 2002, 2006, 2007, 2009

=== International ===
Egypt

- Africa Cup of Nations: 2006
