= Wael Gomaa =

Egyptian footballer (born 1975)

Wael Gomaa وَائِل جُمْعَة
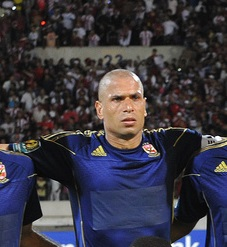
- Gomaa with Al Ahly in 2011

Personal information
- Full name: Wael Kamel Gomaa El Hawty
- Date of birth: 3 August 1975 (age 51)
- Place of birth: Kotoor, Gharbia, Egypt
- Height: 1.84 m (6 ft 0 in)
- Position: Centre-back

Youth career
- –1993: Ghazl El Mahalla

Senior career*
Years	Team	Apps	(Gls)
1993–2001	Ghazl El Mahalla	82	(6)
2001–2014	Al Ahly	213	(10)
2007–2008	→ Al-Sailiya (loan)	29	(10)
Total		324	(26)

International career
2001–2013	Egypt	114	(1)
- * Club domestic league appearances and goals

Wael Kamel Gomaa El Hawty (Arabic: وَائِل كَامِل جُمْعَة الْحُوتِيّ; born 3 August 1975) is an Egyptian retired professional footballer who played as a centre-back. He is regarded as one of the best African defenders of all time.

== Club career ==
Gomaa's performances with Ghazl El Mahalla in the 2000–01 season earned him a move to Al Ahly after the Egypt Cup final match with Ghazl El Mahalla against Al Ahly.

He made his debut for Al Ahly in a friendly match against Real Madrid in August 2001. His official debut was in the match against Angolan side Petro Atletico in CAF Champions League 2001 on 12 August in Luanda.

He is known for his passing accuracy and the ability to score from corners and free kicks. He could also score powerful headers, as evidenced by his goal in the CAF Champions League 2008 final against Cotonsport Garoua of Cameroon.

In the 2006–07 season, he had pre-season trials with Blackburn Rovers with a view to a January transfer.

In week 23 of the 2010–11 season, in his 200th appearance for Al Ahly in the Egyptian Premier League, he conceded a penalty for Haras El Hodoud which Ahmed Abdel-Ghani missed.

In February 2014, Gomaa announced that he would retire from football at the end of the season. In May 2014, he confirmed that he had officially retired from football. He won 26 trophies with Al Ahly including six CAF Champions League titles. He won 113 caps for Egypt, helping the Pharaohs clinch three Africa Cup of Nations titles.

== International career ==
Gomaa made his international debut on 26 April 2001 in a friendly match against South Korea.

He was pivotal in the Egypt national team's African Cup of Nations in 2006, 2008 and 2010. He appeared in every match for the Egyptian side in both tournaments, defending against top European league players such as Drogba, Eto'o, Manucho and Lomana LuaLua.

Gomaa was chosen by CAF in Best Africa XI three times, in 2006, 2008 and 2010.

Gomaa participated with Egypt in FIFA Confederations Cup and appeared in every match for the Egyptian side. He made his 100th International appearance for Egypt when Egypt played against Uganda on 8 January 2011 in the 2011 Nile Basin Tournament. During the tournament he scored his only international goal, against Kenya in the semi-final. Egypt went on to win the match 5–1.

== Post-retirement advertising ==
In March 2014, Gomaa starred in a Coca-Cola advertisement that saw him get a lot of praise for his good spirit as he acted numerous different characters that had a chance to go to the FIFA World Cup with Coca-Cola after Egypt failed to qualify for the tournament. The ad received a lot of praise for its creativity and had widely received positive reviews.

== Career statistics ==
=== International ===
Appearances and goals by national team and year
National team	Year	Apps	Goals
Egypt	2001	1	0
Egypt	2002	11	0
Egypt	2003	2	0
Egypt	2004	6	0
Egypt	2005	14	0
Egypt	2006	12	0
Egypt	2007	4	0
Egypt	2008	17	0
Egypt	2009	15	0
Egypt	2010	12	0
Egypt	2011	8	1
Egypt	2012	2	0
Egypt	2013	10	0
Total		114	1

Scores and results list Egypt's goal tally first, score column indicates score after each Gomaa goal.

List of international goals scored by Wael Gomaa
No.	Date	Venue	Opponent	Score	Result	Competition
1	14 January 2011	Petrosport Stadium, Cairo, Egypt	Kenya	3–0	5–1	2011 Nile Basin Tournament

== Honours ==
Al Ahly

- Egyptian Premier League: 2004–05, 2005–06, 2006–07, 2008–09, 2009–10, 2010–11, 2013–14
- Egypt Cup: 2003, 2006, 2007
- Egyptian Super Cup: 2003, 2005, 2006, 2007, 2008, 2010, 2012
- CAF Champions League: 2001, 2005, 2006, 2008, 2012, 2013
- CAF Super Cup: 2002, 2006, 2007, 2009, 2013, 2014

Egypt

- African Cup of Nations: 2006, 2008, 2010

Individual

- CAF Team of the Year: 2005, 2008, 2009, 2010
- World Military Cup best player: 2001
- African Cup of Nations Team of the Tournament: 2006, 2008, 2010

== See also ==
- List of men's footballers with 100 or more international caps
