= 1950–51 Egyptian Premier League =

Egyptian Premier League
- Season: 1950–51
- Dates: 29 September 1950 – 29 April 1951
- Champions: Al Ahly (3rd title)
- Relegated: No teams were relegated as the second division was cancelled
- Matches played: 89
- Goals scored: 206 (2.31 per match)
- Top goalscorer: El-Dhizui and Awad Abdel Rahman (13 goals)
- Biggest home win: Al Ahly 4–0 Olympic (3 December 1950)
- Biggest away win: Teram 0–4 El Sekka El Hadid (17 December 1950)
- Highest scoring: Teram 4–6 Al Masry (19 November 1950)
- All statistics correct as of 11 March 2020.

The 1950–51 Egyptian Premier League started in September 1950. Al Ahly were crowned champions for the third time in the club's history.

== League table ==
Pos	Team	Pld	W	D	L	GF	GA	GD	Pts
1	Al Ahly (C)	18	10	5	3	31	12	+19	25
2	Zamalek	18	11	3	4	27	17	+10	25
3	Al Masry	18	8	6	4	25	21	+4	22
4	Tersana SC	18	8	4	6	17	14	+3	20
5	El Sekka El Hadid	18	7	4	7	23	17	+6	18
6	Ismaily SC	18	5	7	6	23	24	−1	17
7	Al Ittihad	18	5	5	8	14	20	−6	15
8	Olympic	18	5	5	8	12	20	−8	15
9	Port Fuad	18	5	3	10	19	27	−8	13
10	Teram	18	3	4	11	15	34	−19	10

(C) Champions
