= Abdel Galil Hamza =

Egyptian footballer (1923-2000)

Personal information
- Date of birth: 28 December 1923
- Date of death: 8 August 2000 (aged 76)
- Position: Goalkeeper

International career
Years	Team	Apps	(Gls)
- Egypt

Abdel Galil Hamza (28 December 1923 – 8 August 2000) was an Egyptian footballer. He competed in the men's tournament at the 1952 Summer Olympics.
