= Walid Salah El-Din =

Egyptian footballer (born 1971)

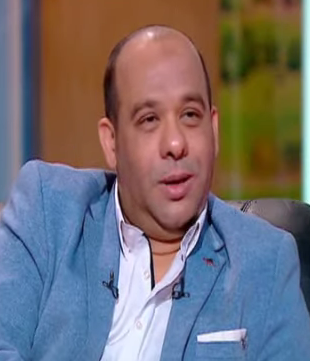

Personal information
- Full name: Walid Salah El-Din Mustafa
- Date of birth: October 27, 1971 (age 55)
- Place of birth: Cairo, Egypt
- Height: 1.68 m (5 ft 6 in)
- Position: Attacking midfielder

Youth career
- 1983–1988: El-Ahly

Senior career*
Years	Team	Apps	(Gls)
1989–2003	El-Ahly	297	(50)
2003–2005	Ittihad	76	(2)

International career
1991–1992	Egypt U21		
1994–2001	Egypt	41	(4)
- * Club domestic league appearances and goals

Walid Salah El-Din (Arabic وليد صلاح الدين) (born October 27, 1971) is an Egyptian footballer. Walid played as an attacking midfielder for Egyptian club side El-Ahly as well as the Egypt national football team.

He played for Egypt at the 1999 FIFA Confederations Cup.

== Career statistics ==
=== International ===
Scores and results list Egypt's goal tally first, score column indicates score after each El-Din goal.

List of international goals scored by Seo Dong-won
No.	Date	Venue	Opponent	Score	Result	Competition
1	14 October 1994	Cairo International Stadium, Cairo, Egypt	Tanzania	3–1	5–1	1996 Africa Cup of Nations qualification
2	11 November 1994	Cairo International Stadium, Cairo, Egypt	Ethiopia	4–0	5–0	1996 Africa Cup of Nations qualification
3	9 July 1995	Abbasiyyin Stadium, Damascus Syria	Syria	1–0	1–1	Friendly
4	25 January 1998	Rajamangala Stadium, Bangkok, Thailand	Thailand	1–1	3–1	1998 King's Cup
