= Hussein Madkour =

Egyptian footballer (1919–2001)

Personal information
- Date of birth: 1919
- Place of birth: Cairo, Egypt
- Date of death: 30 June 2001 (aged 81–82)

International career
Years	Team	Apps	(Gls)
- Egypt

Hussein Madkour (1919 – 30 June 2001) was an Egyptian footballer. He competed in the men's tournament at the 1948 Summer Olympics.
