= 2004–05 Egyptian Premier League =

Egyptian Premier League
- Season: 2004–05
- Champions: Al Ahly
- Relegated: Baladeyet El-Mahalla; Tersana; Mansoura
- CAF Champions League: Al Ahly (1st), ENNPI (2nd)
- CAF Confederation Cup: Al-Ittihad Al-Sakndary (Cup 2nd), Haras El Hodood (3rd)
- Top goalscorer: Emad Moteab (15)
- Longest unbeaten run: Al Ahly; 26 matches (all)

In the 2004–05 Egyptian Premier League, 14 teams participated. The first-placed team was the champion, and qualified to the CAF Champions League 2006 along with the team finishing in second place. The third-placed team qualified to the CAF Confederation Cup. Finally, the bottom three in the league are relegated to play the next season in the second division.

Each team played 26 matches from September 2004 to April 2005. Al Ahly were crowned champions by a 31-point margin and did not lose a game during the campaign (only dropping four points via two draws), a feat they repeated the following season.

== League table ==
Pos	Team	Pld	W	D	L	GF	GA	GD	Pts	Qualification or relegation
1	Al Ahly (C)	26	24	2	0	59	13	+46	74	2006 CAF Champions League
2	ENPPI	26	11	10	5	43	26	+17	43	2006 CAF Champions League
3	Haras El Hodood	26	10	9	7	42	33	+9	39	2006 CAF Confederation Cup
4	Ismaily	26	10	9	7	30	25	+5	39	
5	Suez Cement	26	10	7	9	29	31	−2	37	
6	Zamalek	26	9	9	8	37	30	+7	36	
7	Al Masry	26	7	11	8	29	22	+7	32	
8	Ghazl Al Mehalla	26	8	7	11	25	28	−3	31	
9	Al Itthad Al Sakandary	26	9	4	13	25	37	−12	31	2006 CAF Confederation Cup
10	El-Gaish	26	7	9	10	23	33	−10	30	
11	Asmant Asyut	26	7	8	11	24	36	−12	29	
12	Baladeyet El-Mahalla	26	6	8	12	27	42	−15	26	Relegation to Egyptian Second Division
13	Tersana	26	6	7	13	25	42	−17	25	Relegation to Egyptian Second Division
14	Mansoura	26	4	8	14	18	38	−20	20	Relegation to Egyptian Second Division

(C) Champions
