= Ahmed Mekkawi =

Egyptian footballer (1923–1996)

Personal information
- Date of birth: 5 March 1923
- Place of birth: Zagazig, Egypt
- Date of death: 5 April 1996 (aged 73)

International career
Years	Team	Apps	(Gls)
- Egypt

Ahmed Mekkawi (5 March 1923 – 5 April 1996) was an Egyptian footballer. He competed at the 1948 Summer Olympics and the 1952 Summer Olympics.
