= Fouad Sedki =

Egyptian footballer (1925-1996)

Personal information
- Date of birth: 24 October 1925
- Place of birth: Cairo, Egypt
- Date of death: 12 January 1996 (aged 70)
- Place of death: Giza

International career
Years	Team	Apps	(Gls)
- Egypt
Medal record
Men's football
Representing United Arab Republic (as manager)
Africa Cup of Nations
Third place	1963 Ghana

Fouad Sedki (Arabic: فؤاذ صدقي; 24 October 1925 – 12 January 1996) was an Egyptian footballer who played for the national team. He competed in the 1948 Summer Olympics and the 1952 Summer Olympics.

== Honours ==
=== Manager ===
United Arab Republic

- African Cup of Nations: 3rd place, 1963
