= 1961–62 Al Ahly SC season =

Al Ahly
1961–62 season
- Chairman: Salah Dessouki
- Stadium: Cairo Stadium
- Egyptian Premier League: Winners
- Egypt Cup: First round
- Top goalscorer: Taha Ismail (11 goals)

The 1961–62 Al Ahly SC season lists the results of the Egyptian association football team Al Ahly SC in the 1961–62 season.

== Competitions ==
=== Overview ===
Competition	Starting round	Final position	Record							
Competition	Starting round	Final position	Pld	W	D	L	GF	GA	GD	Win %
Egyptian Premier League	Matchday 1	Winners	18	13	3	2	37	16	+21	72.22
Egypt Cup	First round	First round	1	0	0	1	0	4	−4	0.00
Total			19	13	3	3	37	20	+17	68.42

Source: Competitions

=== Egyptian Premier League ===
==== League table ====
Pos	Club	Pld	W	D	L	F	A	Pts
1	Al Ahly (C)	18	13	3	2	37	16	29
2	Zamalek	18	12	2	4	35	15	26
3	Tersana	18	12	1	5	36	21	25
4	El Qanah	18	11	2	5	36	20	24
5	Al Masry	18	5	6	7	29	32	16
6	Suez	18	7	2	9	24	27	16
7	Al Ittihad	18	5	3	10	23	42	13
8	Tanta	18	4	4	10	16	28	12
9	Olympic	18	3	5	10	21	39	11
10	El Sekka El Hadid	18	1	6	11	17	34	8

(C)= Champions, (R)= Relegated, Pld = Matches played; W = Matches won; D = Matches drawn; L = Matches lost; F = Goals for; A = Goals against; ± = Goal difference; Pts = Points.

=== Matches ===
Opponent	Venue	Result	Scorers
Suez	A	1–3	Saleh Selim, Taha Ismail (2)
Tersana	H	4–0	Taha Ismail (2), Mahmoud El-Gohary (2)
El Qanah	A	1–0	
Al Ittihad	H	3–2	Mimi El-Sherbini, Saleh Selim, Mahmoud El-Gohary
El Sekka El Hadid	A	0–1	Tarek Salim
Al Masry	H	2–1	Saleh Selim (2)
Tanta	A	1–1	Saleh Selim
Olympic	H	3–0	Saleh Selim, Mahmoud El-Gohary, Awadian
Zamalek	A	0–3	Saleh Selim, Mahmoud El-Gohary, Taha Ismail
Suez	H	3–0	Taha Ismail (3)
Tersana	A	5–1	Saleh Selim
El Qanah	H	2–1	Sobhi Toql, Moustafa Abdel Ghali
Al Ittihad	A	2–3	Rifaat El-Fanagily, Tarek Selim, Moustafa Abdel Ghali
El Sekka El Hadid	H	0–0	
Al Masry	A	2–2	Taha Ismail (2)
Tanta	H	1–0	Taha Ismail
Olympic	A	0–2	Elwi Matar, Rifaat El-Fanagily
Zamalek	H	3–0	Mahmoud El-Sayes, Tarek Selim, Rifaat El-Fanagily

== Egypt Cup ==
Date	Round	Opponent	Venue	Result	Scorers
2 March 1962	FR	Tersana	A	4–0	Badawi Abdel Fattah (2), Hassan El-Shazly, Mimi Abdel Hamid (O.G)

== Friendly matches ==
1 June 1962	Al Ahly (Egypt)	3–2	(Portugal) Benfica	Cairo, Egypt
	Badawi Abdel Fattah 4', 28'; Taha Ismail 64'	Report	José Águas 23'; Eusébio 66'	Stadium: Cairo Stadium
