= Rifaat El-Fanagily =

Egyptian footballer (1936-2004)

Personal information
- Full name: Rifaat El-Fanagily
- Date of birth: 1 May 1936
- Place of birth: Damietta, Egypt
- Date of death: 23 June 2004 (aged 68)
- Position: Midfielder

Senior career*
Years	Team	Apps	(Gls)
1953–1970	Al-Ahly		

International career
1955–1967	Egypt	56	(13)
Medal record
Men's Football
Representing Egypt
Africa Cup of Nations
Winner	1957 Sudan
Representing United Arab Republic
Africa Cup of Nations
Winner	1959 United Arab Republic
Runner-up	1962 Ethiopia
Third place	1963 Ghana
- * Club domestic league appearances and goals

Rifaat El-Fanagily (Arabic: رفعت الفناجيلي; 1 May 1936, in Damietta – 23 June 2004) was an Egyptian footballer who played as a midfielder for Al-Ahly. He also played for the Egyptian national team, and was part of the team that won the 1957 and 1959 Africa Cup of Nations, and represented his country in the 1960 and 1964 Summer Olympics.

== Honours ==
Al Ahly

- Egyptian Premier League: 1953–54, 1955–56, 1956–57, 1957–58, 1958–59, 1960–61, 1961–62
- Egypt Cup: 1952–53, 1955–56, 1957–58, 1960–61, 1965–66

Egypt

- African Cup of Nations: 1957

United Arab Republic

- African Cup of Nations: 1959; runner-up, 1962; 3rd place, 1963
