= Abdou Noshi =

Egyptian footballer (1939-1992)

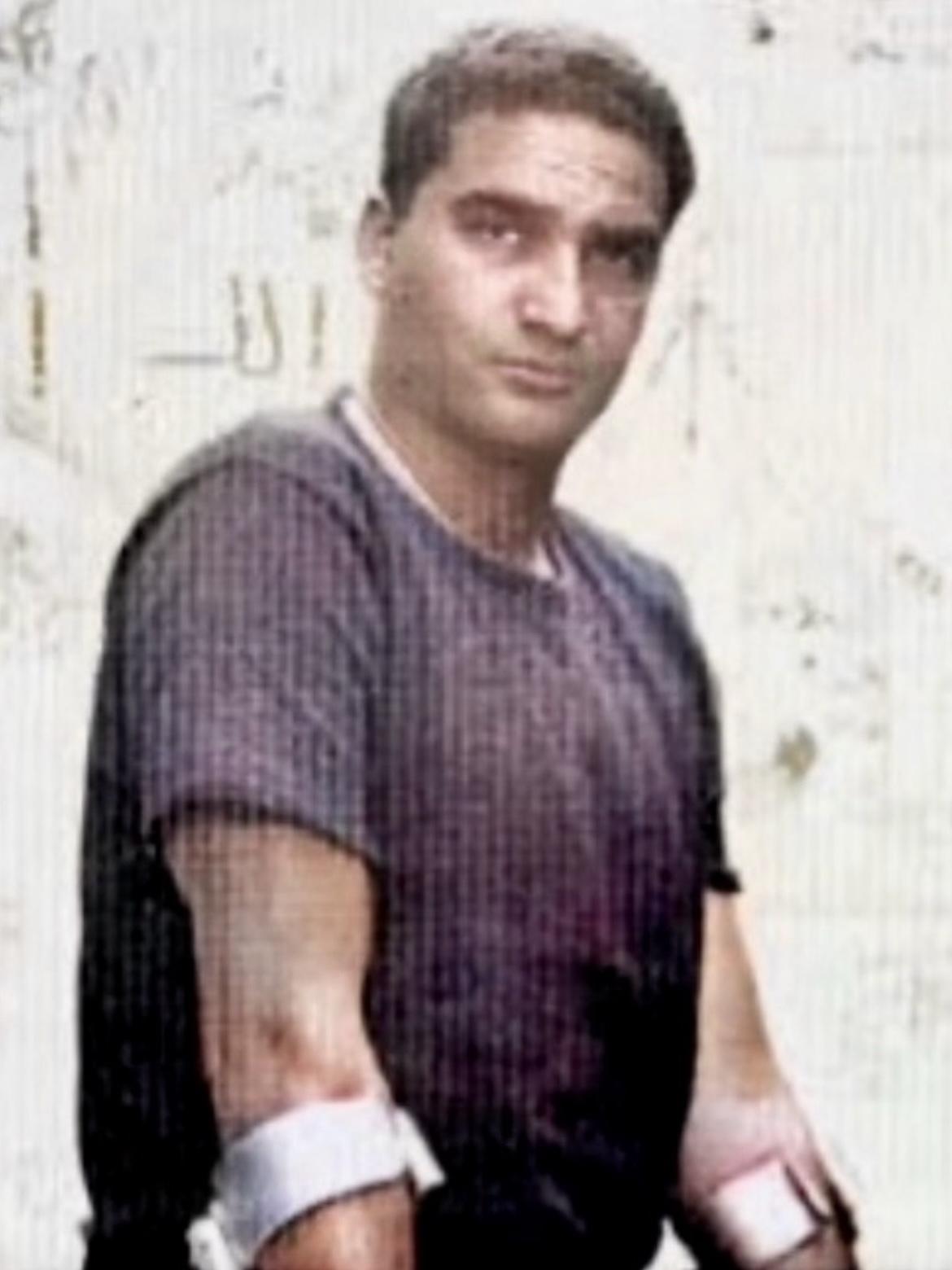
- Noshi in 1964

Personal information
- Date of birth: 1 September 1939
- Place of birth: Cairo, Egypt
- Date of death: 6 March 1992 (aged 52)
- Place of death: Cairo, Egypt
- Position: Midfielder

Youth career
- 1952–1956: Zamalek

Senior career*
Years	Team	Apps	(Gls)
1956–1966	Zamalek		(36)
1966–1967	El-Tayaran		
1971–1973	El-Mokawloon		

International career
1958–1965	Egypt		
Medal record
Men's football
Representing Egypt
Africa Cup of Nations
Winner	1959 Egypt
- * Club domestic league appearances and goals

Abdou Noshi (1 September 1939 – 6 March 1992) was an Egyptian footballer. He played most of his career with Zamalek, he competed with Egypt in the men's tournament at the 1960 Summer Olympics and the 1964 Summer Olympics.

== Football career ==
=== Club career ===
Noshi began his youth career in Zamalek, his debut with thel first team was at the end of the 1956–57 league season with a match with Ismaily, during which he scored a goal. He played for Zamalek for ten seasons until the 1965–66 season. During his career with Zamalek, Noshi won three Egyptian Premier League titles in (1959–60, 1963–64, 1964–65) and five Egypt Cup titles in (1957, 1958, 1959, 1960, 1962).

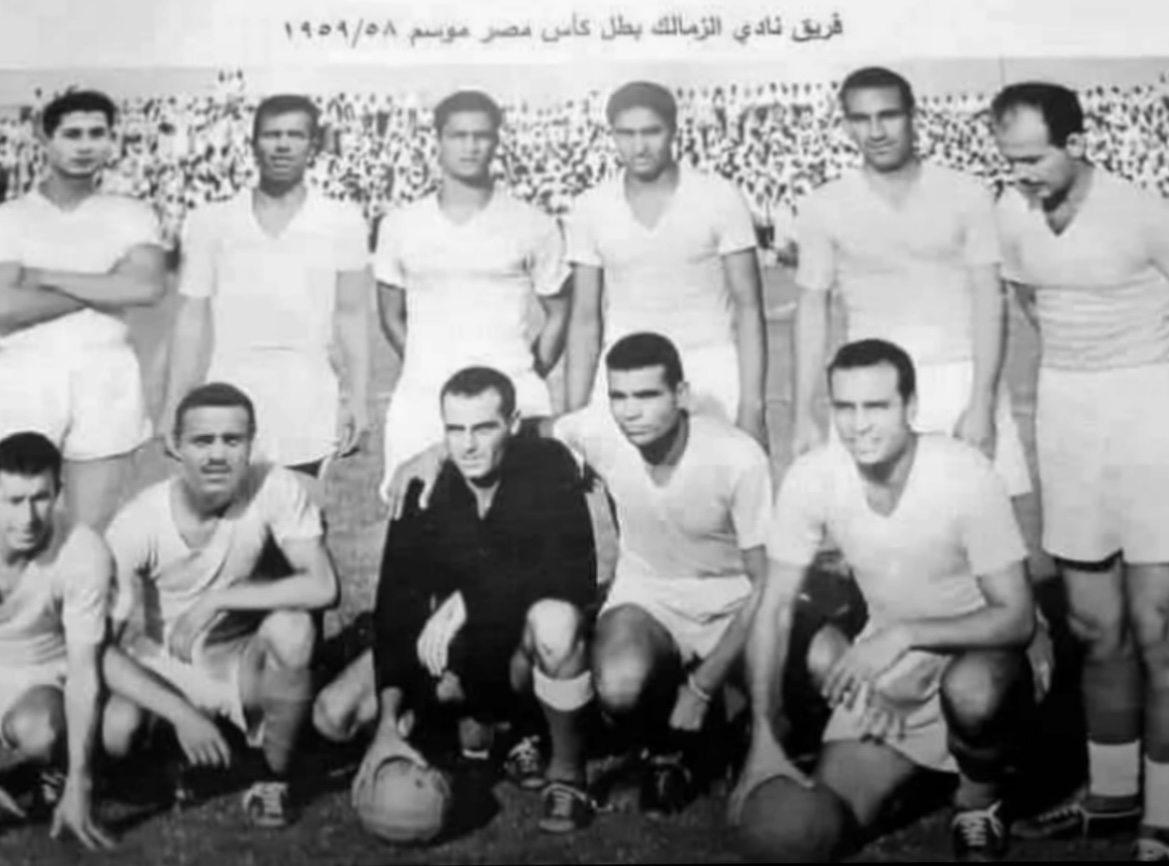
Noshi (third standing from right) with Zamalek in 1959

He scored 36 goals in the league and 4 goals in the Egypt Cup with Zamalek. He moved from Zamalek to El-Tayaran Club and from there to El-Mokawloon. He was famous for his powerful shots, which prompted football critic Naguib Al-Mestakawi to give Noshi the nickname “Polaris” after a missile, and he was famous for his propulsion and power.

=== International career ===
With the Egypt national football team, Noshi was part of the team that won the trophy at the 1959 African Cup of Nations while he was just 20. He played in the 1962 African Cup of Nations reaching the final and achieving the silver medal.

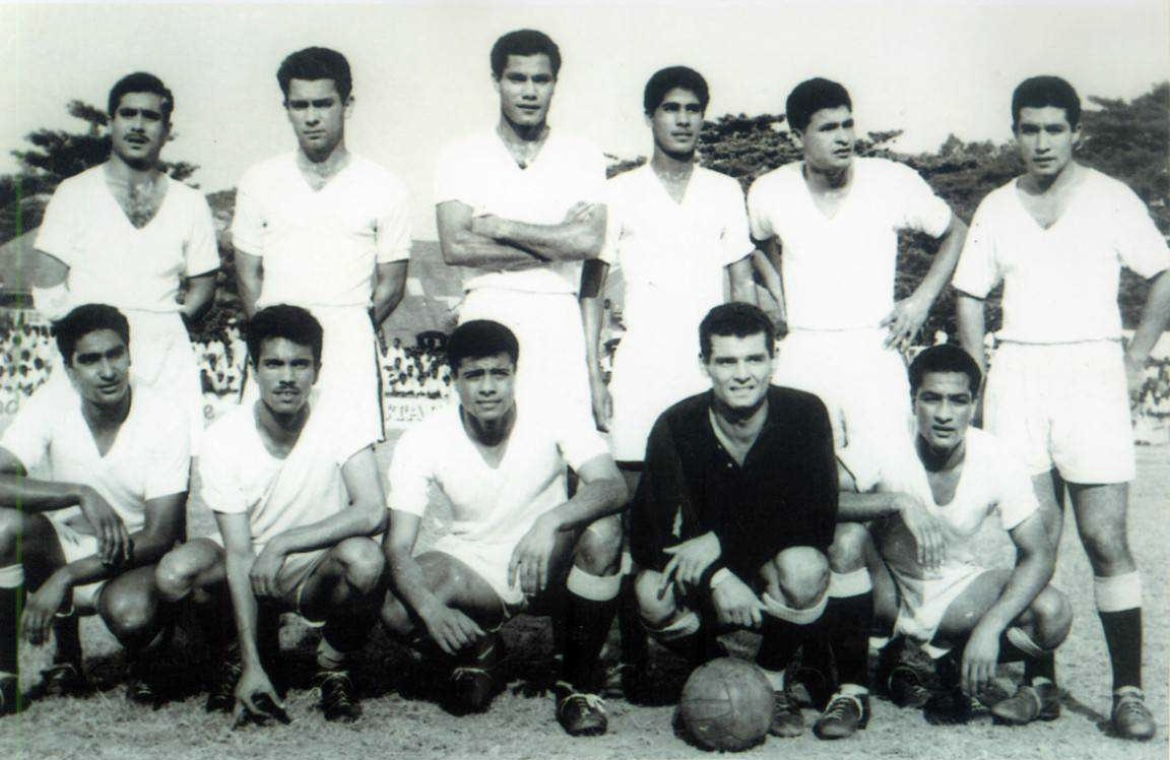
Noshi (first sitting from left) with Egypt in 1959

In the Olympic Games, Noshi participated with his country in the men’s tournament for the 1960 Olympics in Rome. Also, he participated in the men’s tournament in the 1964 Olympics in Tokyo, where Egypt reached the semi final and achieved the fourth place.

== Honours ==
Zamalek

- Egyptian Premier League: 1959–60, 1963-64, 1964–65
- Egypt Cup: 1957, 1958, 1959, 1960, 1962

Egypt

- Africa Cup of Nations: 1959
- Summer Olympic Games fourth place: 1964
