= 1972–73 Egyptian Premier League =

Egyptian Premier League
- Season: 1972–73
- Dates: 6 October 1972 – 22 April 1973
- Champions: Ghazl El Mahalla (1st title)
- Relegated: Aviation; El Plastic
- Matches played: 132
- Goals scored: 216 (1.64 per match)
- Top goalscorer: Omasha Omasha (12 goals)

The 1972–73 Egyptian Premier League, was the 18th season of the Egyptian Premier League, the top Egyptian professional league for association football clubs, since its establishment in 1948. The season started on 6 October 1972 and concluded on 22 April 1973. Ghazl El Mahalla won the league for the first time in the club's history.

== League table ==
Pos	Club	Pld	W	D	L	F	A	Pts
1	Ghazl El Mahalla (C)	22	13	7	2	29	10	33
2	Zamalek	22	11	10	1	25	10	32
3	Ismaily	22	11	8	3	29	13	30
4	Al Ahly	22	10	7	5	20	10	27
5	Al Ittihad	22	11	5	6	25	17	27
6	Tersana	22	9	6	7	18	18	24
7	Olympic Club	22	4	10	8	13	19	18
8	El Qanah	22	5	7	10	8	15	17
9	Damietta	22	4	9	9	13	22	17
10	Al Masry	22	7	2	13	13	27	16
11	El Plastic (R)	22	3	8	11	14	29	14
12	Aviation (R)	22	2	5	15	9	26	9

(C)= Champion, (R)= Relegated, Pld = Matches played; W = Matches won; D = Matches drawn; L = Matches lost; F = Goals for; A = Goals against; ± = Goal difference; Pts = Points.

== Top goalscorers ==
Rank	Player	Club	Goals
1	(Egypt) Omasha Omasha	Ghazl El Mahalla	12
2	(Egypt) Ali Abo Gresha	Ismaily	10
3	(Egypt) Sayed Abdel Razek	Ismaily	7
4	(Egypt) Ossama Khalil	Ismaily	7
5	(Egypt) Mussad Nur	Al Masry	6

== Teams location ==
Team	Home city
Al Ahly	Cairo
Aviation	Cairo
Al Masry	Port Said
Al Ittihad	Alexandria
Damietta SC	Damietta
El Qanah	Ismailia
El Plastic	Cairo
Ghazl El Mahalla	El Mahalla
Ismaily	Ismailia
Olympic	Alexandria
Tersana	Giza
Zamalek	Giza

Locations of the 1972–73 Egyptian Premier League teams
