= Mahmoud El-Gohary =

Egyptian footballer and coach (1938–2012)

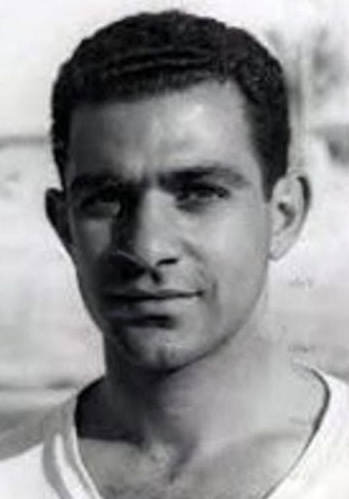
- El-Gohary in 1959

Personal information
- Full name: Mahmoud Nuseir Youssef El-Gohary
- Date of birth: 20 February 1938
- Place of birth: Cairo, Kingdom of Egypt
- Date of death: 31 August 2012 (aged 74)
- Place of death: Amman, Jordan
- Position: Striker

Senior career*
Years	Team	Apps	(Gls)
1955–1961	Al Ahly		

International career
1958–1961	Egypt	5	(3)

Managerial career
- 1965–1977: Al Ahly (assistant)
- 1977–1981: Al-Ittihad (assistant)
- 1981–1982: Al-Ittihad
- 1982–1984: Al Ahly
- 1984–1985: Al-Sharjah
- 1985–1986: Al Ahly
- 1986–1988: Al-Ahli Jeddah
- 1988–1990: Egypt
- 1991–1993: Al Ahly
- 1993–1994: Zamalek
- 1995–1996: Al-Wahda
- 1996–1997: Oman
- 1997–2002: Egypt
- 2002–2007: Jordan
Medal record
Men's football
Representing United Arab Republic (as player)
Africa Cup of Nations
Winner	1959 United Arab Republic
Representing Egypt (as manager)
Winner	1998
- * Club domestic league appearances and goals

Mahmoud Nuseir Youssef El-Gohary (Arabic: محمود نصير يوسف الجوهري; 20 February 1938 – 31 August 2012) was an Egyptian footballer and football coach.

== Career ==
As a player, El-Gohary had a short-lived career. A persistent knee injury forced him into early retirement in 1961, cutting short a promising career. In the 1959 African Cup of Nations, which Egypt won, he ended as the top scorer in the competition. He was also part of Egypt's squad for the 1960 Summer Olympics. After his retirement from the game, El-Gohary became a coach with Al Ahly, eventually becoming an assistant manager from 1965 to 1977.

In 1977, he became assistant manager to Dettmar Cramer at Al-Ittihad in Saudi Arabia. Cramer left Al-Ittihad at the end of the 1981 season and El-Gohary was promoted to manager. Al-Ittihad won their first ever Saudi Premier League and El-Gohary won the first of many trophies as a manager. At Al Ahly, he won the first African League titles – African League Winners and African League Cup winners. With Zamalek, he won the 1993 African Cup of Champions Clubs and the first African Super Cup in 1994 against Al Ahly in the famous African Super of the 20th Century.

Under his leadership, Egypt's national football team, he qualified for the FIFA World Cup in 1990, after the country's 56-year absence from the tournament (at the time, the longest record for a team to be absent between one tournament and another, later equaled by Norway in 1994 and overcome by Wales in 2022). Under your command, Egypt drew with Netherlands by 1–1 and Republic of Ireland by 0–0, and lost for England by 0–1, being eliminated in the group stage in the Group F. He also won with Egypt the Arab Cup in 1992 and the Africa Cup of Nations in 1998. Under El-Gohary's management, the Jordanian national football team reached the highest FIFA World Rankings in history when they reached 37th rank in August 2004. Under the leadership of El-Gohary, the Jordanian national team qualified for their first (AFC) Asian Football Confederation in China 2004. Jordan reached the quarterfinals of the tournament but failed to qualify for the semifinals after losing to Japan in a penalty shoot-out, resulting in a score of 1–1. In the West Asian Football Federation Championship Tournaments of 2004 and 2007, El-Gohary helped Jordan win third place.

After he retired as a football coach, he worked as the technical director for the Egyptian Football Association. Later, he became the technical adviser for the Jordan Football Association. He helped to transform the Jordanian Football League into a professional body. He died on 31 August 2012, in Amman, Jordan.

== Honours ==
=== Player ===
Al Ahly

- Egyptian Premier League: 1955–56, 1956–57, 1957–58, 1958–59, 1960–61
- Egypt Cup: 1956, 1958, 1961

United Arab Republic

- African Cup of Nations: 1959

=== Manager ===
Al-Ittihad Club

- Saudi Premier League: 1981–82

Al Ahly

- Egyptian Premier League: 1985–86
- Egypt Cup: 1984, 1985
- African Cup of Champions Clubs: 1982
- African Cup Winners' Cup: 1985

Zamalek

- African Cup of Champions Clubs: 1993
- CAF Super Cup: 1994

Egypt

- Arab Nations Cup: 1992
- African Cup of Nations: 1998
