= 1975–76 Egyptian Premier League =

Egyptian Premier League
- Season: 1975–76
- Dates: 26 September 1975 – 21 May 1976
- Champions: Al Ahly (13th title)
- Relegated: El Qanah; Damietta; Belkas; Beni Suef; Tanta; El Sharkia; Factory 36; El Minya; Shourta
- Matches played: 306
- Goals scored: 522 (1.71 per match)
- Top goalscorer: Ossama Khalil (18 goals)

The 1975–76 Egyptian Premier League, was the 19th season of the Egyptian Premier League, the top Egyptian professional league for association football clubs, since its establishment in 1948. The season started on 26 September 1975 and concluded on 21 May 1976. Al Ahly won the league for the 13th time in the club's history.

== League table ==
=== Group 1 ===
Pos	Club	Pld	W	D	L	F	A	Pts
1	El Mahalla (Q)	22	14	8	9	37	9	36
2	Zamalek	22	14	5	3	34	14	33
3	Olympic	22	11	8	3	34	17	30
4	Tersana	22	10	6	6	32	18	26
5	El Sekka	22	9	7	6	24	17	25
6	Esco	22	10	5	7	22	17	25
7	El Plastic	22	9	7	6	19	17	25
8	Suez	22	8	8	6	19	11	24
9	El Qanah (R)	22	2	9	11	10	28	13
10	Damietta (R)	22	3	5	14	11	31	11
11	Belkas (R)	22	3	5	14	12	40	11
12	Beni Suef (R)	22	1	3	18	7	51	5

(Q)= Qualification to Championship play-off, (R)= Relegated, Pld = Matches played; W = Matches won; D = Matches drawn; L = Matches lost; F = Goals for; A = Goals against; ± = Goal difference; Pts = Points.

=== Group 2 ===
Pos	Club	Pld	W	D	L	F	A	Pts
1	Al Ahly (Q)	21	17	4	0	49	2	38
2	Ismaily	21	12	6	3	40	17	30
3	El Mansoura	21	6	13	2	18	11	25
4	Al Masry	21	8	7	6	29	22	23
5	Kafr El Sheikh	21	9	5	7	22	17	23
6	Al Ittihad	21	7	9	5	19	16	23
7	Aviation	21	6	11	4	16	16	23
8	Tanta (R)	21	6	10	5	14	16	22
9	El Sharkia (R)	21	4	9	8	9	16	17
10	Factory 36 (R)	21	2	5	14	16	42	9
11	El Minya (R)	21	0	3	18	2	44	3
12	Shourta (R)	11	2	2	7	8	23	0

(Q)= Qualification to Championship play-off, (R)= Relegated, Pld = Matches played; W = Matches won; D = Matches drawn; L = Matches lost; F = Goals for; A = Goals against; ± = Goal difference; Pts = Points.

== Final stage ==
=== Championship play-off matches ===
17 May 1976	Al Ahly	1–0	Ghazl El Mahalla	Cairo Stadium
	Mahmoud El Khatib 58'

21 May 1976	Al Ahly	4–0	Ghazl El Mahalla	Cairo Stadium
	Ahmed Abdel Baquy 47'; Mahmoud El Khatib 65'; Moustafa Abdou 77'; Mohsen Saleh 83'

Al Ahly won 5–0 on aggregate.

== Top goalscorers ==
Rank	Player	Club	Goals
1	(Egypt) Ossama Khalil	Ismaily	18
2	(Egypt) Mahmoud El Khatib	Al Ahly	16
3	(Egypt) Ali Abo Gresha	Ismaily	15
4	(Egypt) Hassan El-Shazly	Tersana	14
5	(Egypt) Hassan Shehata	Zamalek	13
