= 1957–58 Egyptian Premier League =

Egyptian Premier League
- Season: 1957–58
- Dates: 25 October 1957 – 23 May 1958
- Champions: Al Ahly (8th title)
- Relegated: Ismaily; Maleyat Kafr El Zayat; Suez; Al Masry; El Mansoura; Al Ittihad
- Matches played: 132
- Goals scored: 384 (2.91 per match)
- Top goalscorer: Hamdi Abdel Fattah (19 goals)
- Biggest home win: Tersana 9–0 Al Ittihad (18 April 1958)
- Biggest away win: El Mansoura 0–5 Suez (6 June 1958)
- Highest scoring: Tersana 9–0 Al Ittihad (18 April 1958)

The 1957–58 Egyptian Premier League, was the eighth season of the Egyptian Premier League, the top Egyptian professional league for association football clubs. The season started on 25 October 1957 and concluded on 23 May 1958, and it was the first time that the league table consisted of two groups consisting of 8 clubs. Defending champions Al Ahly won their 8th consecutive and 8th overall Egyptian Premier League title in the season.

== League table ==
=== Group 1 ===
Pos	Team	Pld	W	D	L	GF	GA	GD	Pts	Qualification or relegation
1	Al Ahly (Q)	14	10	1	3	45	16	+29	31	Qualification to Championship play-off
2	Tersana	14	7	3	4	36	18	+18	24	
3	Teram	14	7	3	4	16	15	+1	24	
4	Suez	14	6	2	6	17	19	−2	20	
5	Al Masry (R)	14	5	4	5	14	15	−1	19	Qualification to Relegation play-off
6	Al Ittihad (R)	14	4	3	7	13	30	−17	15	Qualification to Relegation play-off
7	El Mansoura (R)	14	3	4	7	10	23	−13	13	Qualification to Relegation play-off
8	Ismaily (R)	14	1	6	7	16	31	−15	9	Relegation to Second Division

Rules for classification: 1) Points; 2) Goal difference; 3) Goals scored.
(Q) Qualified to the phase indicated; (R) Relegated

=== Group 2 ===
Pos	Team	Pld	W	D	L	GF	GA	GD	Pts	Qualification or relegation
1	Zamalek (Q)	14	12	2	0	31	9	+22	38	Qualification to Championship play-off
2	Olympic	14	8	2	4	27	15	+12	26	
3	El Sekka El Hadid	14	6	4	4	14	14	0	22	
4	El Qanah	14	5	5	4	19	14	+5	20	
5	El Suez (R)	14	4	5	5	22	22	0	17	Qualification to Relegation play-off
6	Tanta	14	4	4	6	21	27	−6	16	Qualification to Relegation play-off
7	Ghazl El Mahalla	14	2	4	8	11	20	−9	10	Qualification to Relegation play-off
8	Maleyat Kafr El Zayat (R)	14	0	4	10	9	33	−24	4	Relegation to Second Division

Rules for classification: 1) Points; 2) Goal difference; 3) Goals scored.
(Q) Qualified to the phase indicated; (R) Relegated

== Play-off ==
18 May 1958

Zamalek	1–1	Al Ahly
Khalil Kadry 43'		Rifaat El-Fanagily 84'

23 May 1958

Al Ahly	3–1	Zamalek
El-Dhizui 6'; Saleh Selim 55', 85'		Essam Baheeg 88'
