= 1999–2000 Egyptian Premier League =

Egyptian Premier League
- Season: 1999–2000
- Champions: Al Ahly
- Relegated: Aluminium Nag Hammâdi; Suez SC; El Sharkia SC
- CAF Champions League: Al Ahly (1st), Ismaily SC (2nd)
- CAF Cup: Zamalek SC (3rd)
- Top goalscorer: John Utaka (17 goals)

Fourteen teams contested the 1999–2000 edition of the league. The first team in the league, Al Ahly, were crowned the champions, and qualified for the first round of the CAF Champions League in 2000 along with the team finishing in second place. Third placed team qualified to confederation cup. Finally, the last three in the league will play next season in the second division.

== League table ==
Pos	Team	Pld	W	D	L	GF	GA	GD	Pts	Qualification or relegation
1	Al Ahly (C)	26	18	6	2	41	14	+27	60	2001 CAF Champions League
2	Ismaily	26	17	3	6	53	22	+31	54	2001 CAF Champions League
3	Zamalek SC	26	14	10	2	48	23	+25	52	2001 CAF Cup
4	El Mansoura SC	26	11	5	10	33	30	+3	38	
5	El Mokawloon SC	26	9	9	8	25	22	+3	36	
6	Mazarea Dina FC	26	8	11	7	27	28	−1	35	
7	Al Masry	26	8	9	9	25	25	0	33	
8	Goldi SC	26	8	9	9	28	31	−3	33	
9	El Qanah FC	26	8	9	9	22	25	−3	33	
10	Al Ittihad Alexandria Club	26	7	10	9	19	27	−8	31	
11	Koroum	26	7	8	11	28	28	0	29	
12	Suez SC	26	6	9	11	14	35	−21	27	Relegation to Egyptian Second Division
13	Aluminium Nag Hammâdi	26	4	4	18	18	39	−21	16	Relegation to Egyptian Second Division
14	El Sharkia SC	26	3	6	17	22	54	−32	15	Relegation to Egyptian Second Division

(C) Champions
