= Mahmoud El Khatib =

Egyptian footballer (born 1954)

- محمود الخطيب
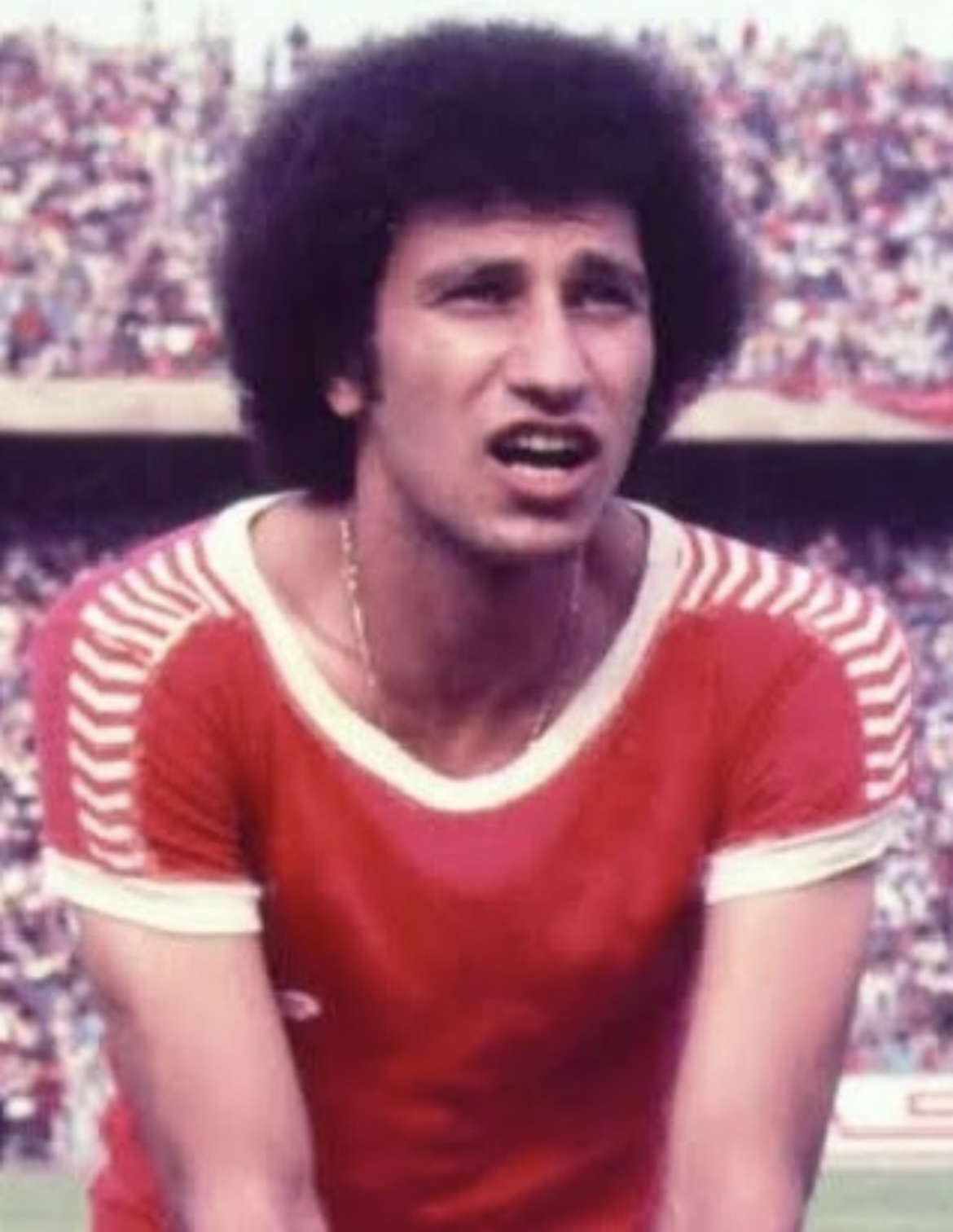
- Bibo with Al Ahly in the 1970s

18th President of Al Ahly SC
- Incumbent
- Assumed office 1 December 2017
- Preceded by: Mahmoud Taher

Personal details
- Born: Mahmoud Ibrahim Ibrahim El Khatib; 30 October 1954 (age 72) Qarqirah, El Senbellawein, Dakahlia, Egypt
- Height: 1.84 m (6 ft 0 in)
- Occupation: Footballer
Association football career
- Position: Forward
Youth career
- 1969–1971: Al Nasr
- 1971–1972: Al Ahly
Senior career*
Years	Team	Apps	(Gls)
1972–1988	Al Ahly	164	(109)
International career
1974–1986	Egypt	54	(24)
Medal record
Men's football
Representing Egypt
Africa Cup of Nations
Winner	1986 Egypt
Third place	1974 Egypt
- * Club domestic league appearances and goals

Mahmoud Ibrahim Ibrahim El Khatib (Arabic: محمود إبراهيم إبراهيم الخطيب; born 30 October 1954), popularly nicknamed Bibo (Arabic: بيبو), is an Egyptian retired footballer and current President of Al Ahly. He is considered as one of the best forwards in the history of African football.

== Early life and education ==
El Khatib was born on 30 October 1954 in Qarqirah, El Senbellawein, Dakahlia. He studied in local schools and obtained his college degree from the Cooperation Institute.

== Career ==
El Khatib played his entire career in Al Ahly, where he won ten Egyptian Premier League titles, five Egypt Cup titles, two African Cup of Champions Clubs titles and three African Cup Winners' Cup titles with Al Ahly. He won the Egyptian League top scorer twice.

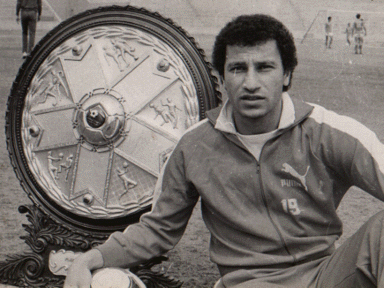
Mahmoud El Khatib with the 1976–77 Egyptian Premier League trophy

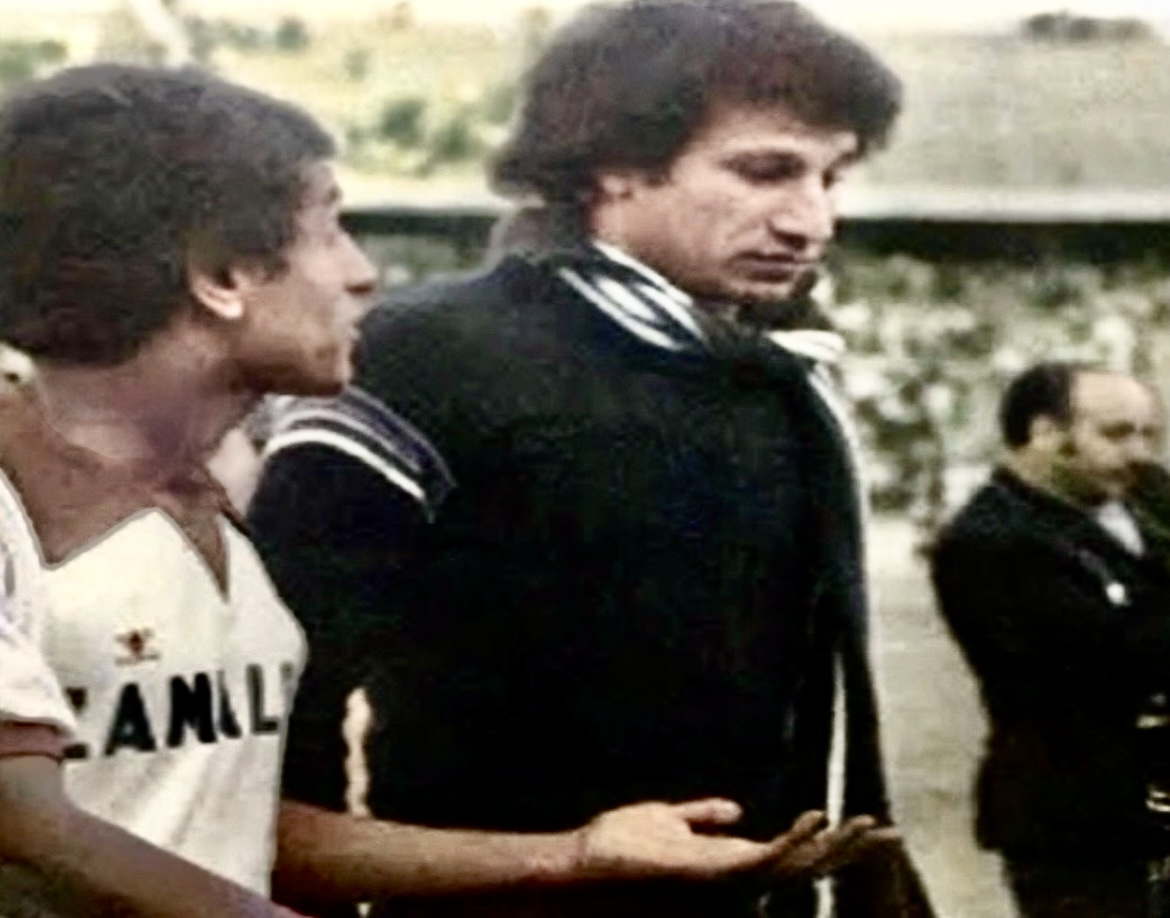
El Khatib (injured) with Zamalek's midfielder Farouk Gaafar during a Cairo derby in 1979

Although he did not achieve the success he achieved with the club with his country and was usually fitter with Al Ahly than Egypt's national team, he was always included in the starting lineup. El-Khatib played for Egypt a total of 54 caps and scored 24 goals. He played with his country in the Africa Cup of Nations in the 1974, 1976, 1980, 1984 editions, and he was a part of the team that won the 1986 Africa Cup of Nations title. He also played in the 1984 Olympics in Los Angeles.

After retirement, he worked in sport management where he was elected Al Ahly's board member for more than a period. In 2004, he became the vice-president of Al Ahly, before being elected as president in 2017.

== Honours and achievements ==
=== Club ===
Al Ahly

- Egyptian Premier League: 1974–75, 1975–76, 1976–77, 1978–79, 1979–80, 1980–81, 1981–82, 1984–85, 1985–86, 1986–87
- Egypt Cup: 1978, 1981, 1983, 1984, 1985
- African Cup of Champions Clubs: 1982, 1987
- African Cup Winners' Cup: 1984, 1985, 1986

=== International ===
Egypt

- African Cup of Nations: 1986

=== Individual ===
==== Awards ====
- Africa Cup of Nations Dream Team: 1980
- African Footballer of the Year: 1983
- CAF Awards: 2004
- IFFHS Legends: 2016
- Al Ahram Al Arabi Arba Sportsman of 20th Century (Note: Other soccer players in the top10 were: Majed Abdullah, Saleh Selim, and Mahmoud El-Gohary.)

==== Performances ====
- Egyptian Premier League top goalscorer: 1977–78, 1980–81
- African Cup of Champions Clubs top scorer: 1977, 1981, 1982, 1983, 1987
