= 1952–53 Al Ahly SC season =

Al Ahly
1952–53 season
- Chairman: Ahmed Aboud Pacha
- Stadium: Al-Hawsh
- Egyptian Premier League: Winners
- Egypt Cup: Winners
- Top goalscorer: Ahmed Mekkawi (13 goals)

The 1952–53 Al Ahly SC season was the

In the 1952–53 season, Al Ahly won the double for the second time after winning it in the 1950–51 season, by winning the league for the fourth time, with only two points ahead of Zamalek, and winning the Egypt Cup after defeating Zamalek in the final 4–1.

The Egyptian Football Association decided this season to play the Cairo League with the youth teams instead of the first team as usual.

== Competitions ==
=== Overview ===
| Competition | Starting round | Final position | Record | | | | | | | |
| Competition | Starting round | Final position | Pld | W | D | L | GF | GA | GD | Win % |
|---|---|---|---|---|---|---|---|---|---|---|
| Egyptian Premier League | Matchday 1 | Winners | 18 | 12 | 4 | 2 | 37 | 23 | +14 | 66.67 |
| Egypt Cup | Quarter Final | Winners | 3 | 3 | 0 | 0 | 10 | 3 | +7 | 100.00 |
| Total | | | 21 | 15 | 4 | 2 | 47 | 26 | +21 | 71.43 |

Source: Competitions

== League table ==
| Pos | Club | Pld | W | D | L | F | A | Pts |
|---|---|---|---|---|---|---|---|---|
| 1 | Al Ahly (C) | 18 | 12 | 4 | 2 | 37 | 23 | 28 |
| 2 | Zamalek | 18 | 10 | 6 | 2 | 33 | 19 | 26 |
| 3 | Al Masry | 18 | 10 | 4 | 4 | 40 | 23 | 24 |
| 4 | Tersana SC | 18 | 9 | 2 | 7 | 42 | 38 | 20 |
| 5 | El Sekka El Hadid | 18 | 7 | 5 | 6 | 32 | 33 | 19 |
| 6 | Al Ittihad | 18 | 8 | 2 | 8 | 36 | 32 | 18 |
| 7 | Olympic | 18 | 6 | 2 | 10 | 29 | 35 | 14 |
| 8 | Port Fuad (R) | 18 | 5 | 3 | 10 | 22 | 31 | 13 |
| 9 | Ismaily SC | 18 | 4 | 3 | 11 | 27 | 41 | 11 |
| 10 | Teram | 18 | 1 | 5 | 12 | 19 | 42 | 7 |

(C)= Champions, (R)= Relegated, Pld = Matches played; W = Matches won; D = Matches drawn; L = Matches lost; F = Goals for; A = Goals against; ± = Goal difference; Pts = Points.

=== Matches ===
| Opponent | Venue | Result | Scorers |
|---|---|---|---|
| Teram | H | 2–0 | Saleh Selim, Ahmed Mekkawi |
| El Sekka El Hadid | A | 2–1 | Saleh Selim, Ahmed Mekkawi |
| Tersana | H | 3–1 | Hussein Madkour, Ahmed Mekkawi (2) |
| Al Ittihad | A | 0–3 | |
| Port Fuad | H | 3–0 | Toto, Fathi Khattab, Ahmed Mekkawi |
| Al Masry | H | 3–0 | Ahmed Mekkawi (2), Wageeh Moustafa |
| Zamalek | A | 0–0 | |
| Olympic | A | 2–1 | Wageeh Moustafa, Nasr |
| Al Ittihad | H | 2–1 | Wageeh Moustafa, Ahmed Mekkawi |
| Tersana | A | 2–6 | Ahmed Mekkawi, Toto |
| Teram | A | 2–2 | Ahmed Mekkawi, El-Hammami |
| Ismaily | H | 2–1 | Ahmed Sokrat, Ahmed Mekkawi |
| Al Masry | A | 1–1 | Fathi Khattab |
| El Sekka El Hadid | H | 3–2 | Ahmed Mekkawi, Fathi Khattab (2) |
| Ismaily | A | 5–2 | Toto (4), Fathi Khattab |
| Port Fuad | A | Withdrawal | |
| Olympic | H | 3–0 | Saleh Selim (2), Ahmed Mekkawi |
| Zamalek | A | 2–2 | Wageeh Moustafa (2) |

== Egypt Cup ==
| Date | Round | Opponent | Venue | Result | Scorers |
|---|---|---|---|---|---|
| 8 March 1953 | QF | El Sekka El Hadid | H | 3–0 | Ahmed Mekkawi, Saleh Selim (2) |
| 1 May 1953 | SF | Al Ittihad | H | 3–2 | Wageeh Moustafa, Hussein Madkour, Saleh Selim |

=== Final ===
8 May 1953

| Al Ahly | 4–1 | Zamalek |
|---|---|---|
| Ahmed Mekkawi 33'; Saleh Selim 38', 43'; Abdel Wahab Selim 87' | Report | Ahmed Abou Hussein 29' |

Referee: Ismail Kaseb
