= Bilqas SC =

Football Club in Bilqas, Egypt

Belkas
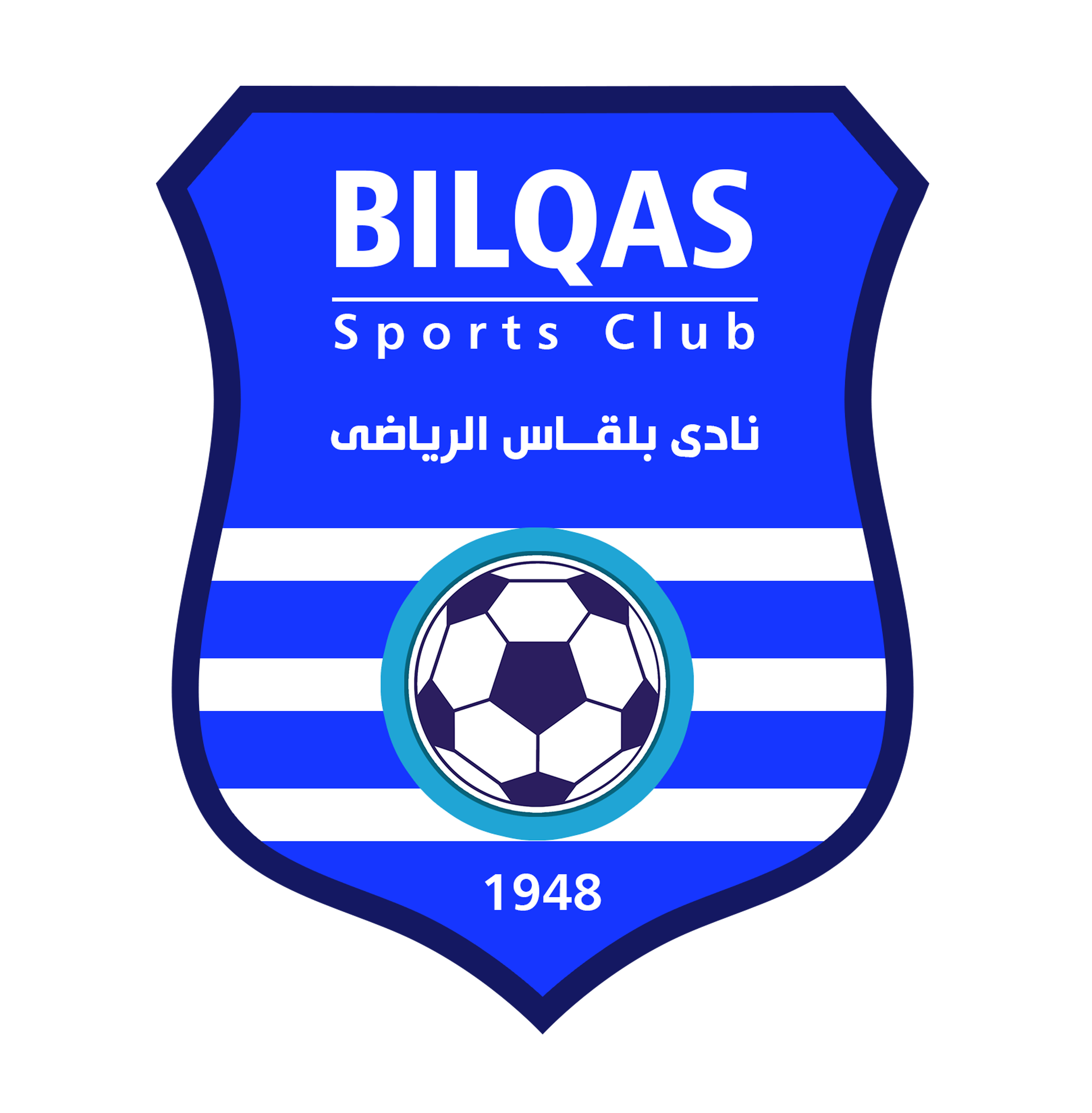
- Full name: Belkas Sports Club
- Founded: 1948
- Ground: Bilqas Stadium, Belqas
- Chairman: Mohamed Tolba
- Manager: Emad Hassan
- League: Third Division, Group 10

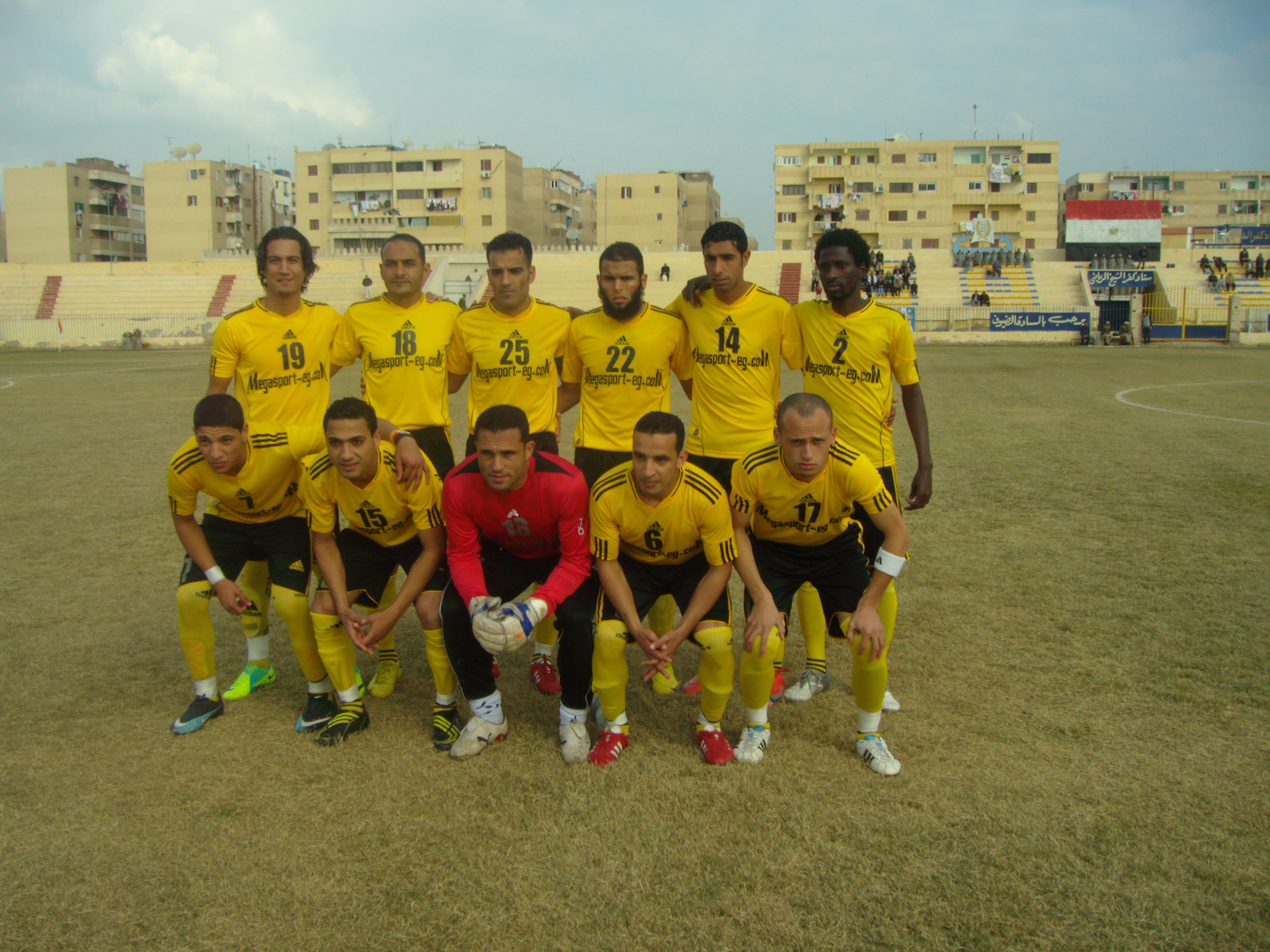
FC Belkas

Belkas Sports Club (Arabic: نادي بلقاس الرياضي) is a football club based in Belqas, Egypt. They are currently members of the Egyptian Third Division.

== History ==
The club was established in 1948. They were promoted to the Egyptian Premier League at the end of the 1974–75 season. Placed in Group A, they finished second-from-bottom of the division in 1975–76 and were relegated back to the second tier.

Belkas were relegated to the third tier after finishing in the relegation zone in 2014–15.
