= Egyptian Premier League =

Association football league in Egypt

Egyptian Premier League EPL ORA League دوري أورا
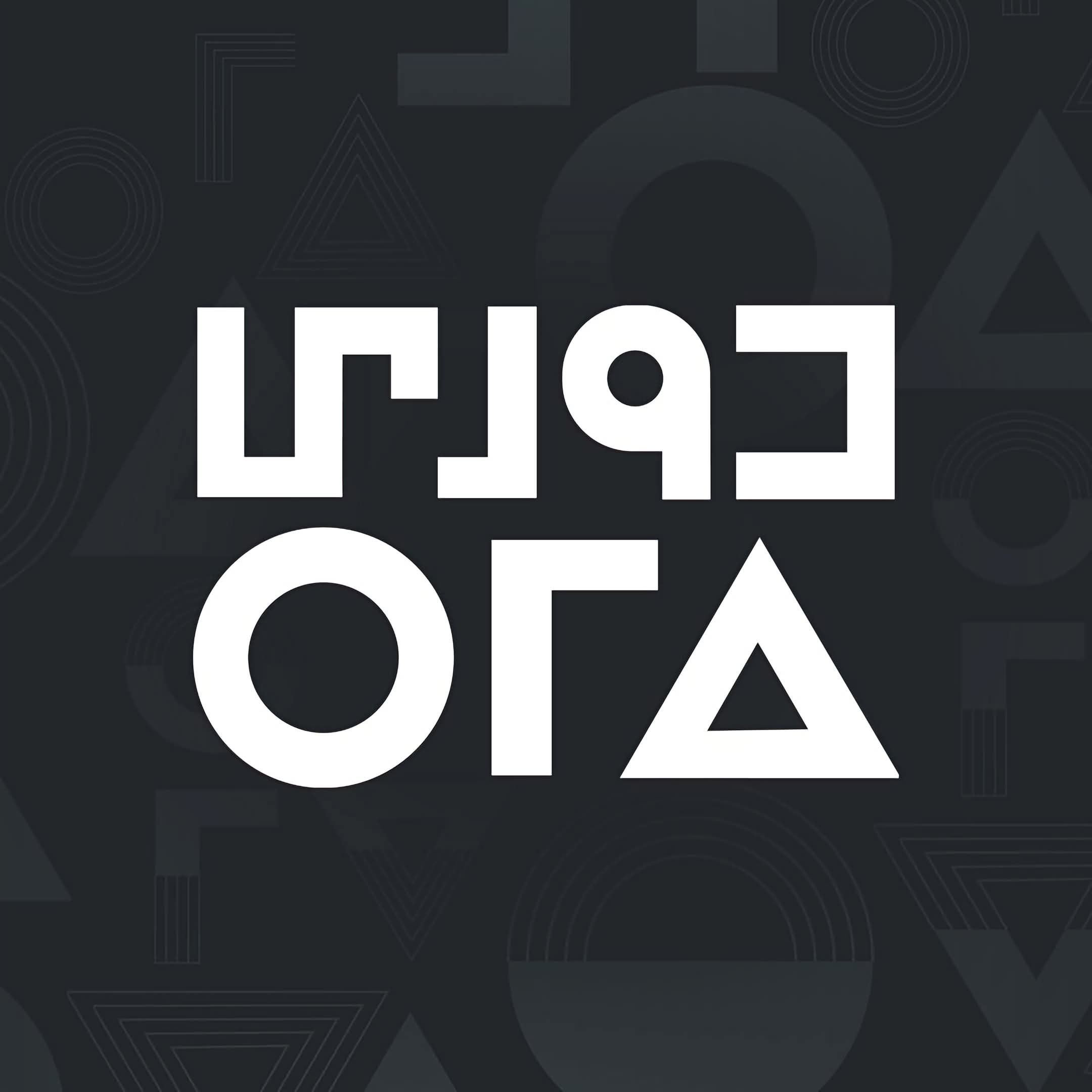
- Organising body: Egyptian Football Association
- Founded: 22 October 1948; 78 years ago
- Country: Egypt
- Confederation: CAF
- Number of clubs: 20
- Level on pyramid: 1st
- Relegation to: Egyptian Second Division A
- Domestic cups: Egypt Cup; Egyptian Super Cup
- League cup: Egyptian League Cup
- International cup(s): CAF Champions League; CAF Confederation Cup
- Current champions: Zamalek (15th title) (2025–26)
- Most championships: Al Ahly (45 titles)
- Most appearances: Abdallah Said (461)
- Top scorer: Hassan El-Shazly (173)
- Broadcaster: ON Sport
- Website: egyptianproleague.com
- Current: 2026–27 Egyptian Premier League

The Egyptian Premier League (Egyptian Arabic: الدوري المصري الممتاز), commonly known as the El Dawry (Egyptian Arabic: الدوري) and officially known as the ORA League (Egyptian Arabic: دوري أورا) for sponsorship reasons, is a professional association football league in Egypt and the highest level of the Egyptian football league system. The league comprises 20 teams and operates on a system of promotion and relegation with the Egyptian Second Division A. Seasons mostly run from August to May. Unlike most other leagues, games are played on all days of the week.

The Egyptian Premier League was founded in 1948, unifying the local leagues that existed previously. 70 clubs have competed in the league since its founding. Al Ahly have won the title 45 times, more than any other club. Their closest rivals, Zamalek, have won the league 15 times. Only five other clubs have won the league; those clubs are Ghazl El Mahalla, Ismaily, Al Mokawloon Al Arab, Olympic Club, and Tersana.

The Egyptian Premier League is one of the top national leagues, ranked First in Africa according to CAF's 5-year ranking for the 2024–25 season, based on performances in African competitions over the past five seasons. Egyptian teams have won the CAF Champions League a record 18 times, and Al Ahly was named the African Club of the Century by CAF. Two clubs have also won the CAF Confederation Cup.

The Egyptian Premier League once had among highest average stadium attendance in Africa and the Middle East until the Port Said Stadium riot occurred on 1 February 2012 after a league match involving Al Masry and Al Ahly, where 74 people were killed and more than 500 were injured. Since that date, all domestic football matches were played behind closed doors until 2017, when the local security authorities started to allow fans to attend selected matches with gradually increasing numbers starting from 100 attendance only and in 2021, the league started to welcome back thousands of supporters.

== History ==
Association football was introduced to Egypt while it was occupied by the British. The first football club in Egypt was El Sekka El Hadid, which was founded in 1903. The Sultan Hussein Cup was founded in 1917, and though it was dominated by English clubs in its first years, until Zamalek won it for the first time in 1921, Egyptian clubs quickly gained power. The Egypt Cup, which no British teams competed in, began in 1922, and won by Zamalek.

The first major football league in Egypt also began play in 1922; consisting of clubs from Cairo, it was called the Cairo League. Three other leagues, in Alexandria, on the Suez Canal, and an obscure league in Bahary (Note: Bahary is an area of Alexandria, but it is not clear whether the league represented that area or not) began soon afterwards. It was at this time that the clubs Zamalek and Al-Ahly (Note: first named El-Mokhtalat and then King Farouk Club) began their dominance, with the two clubs regularly winning the Cairo League and the Egypt Cup.

In 1938, the Egyptian Football Association (EFA) took control of the Cairo Zone Competition, along with the other three leagues. The Cairo Zone Competition was renamed the Cairo League, but otherwise remained mostly unchanged until the mid-1940s. The EFA felt that a national league, rather than many local leagues, was necessary. The President of the EFA passed the idea on to King Farouk I, who was an avid football fan. The Egyptian Premier League was founded by royal decree, and began play in 1948.

=== Early years (1948–1960) ===
The first match, played on 22 October, was between Zamalek and Al Masry SC, and finished in a 5–1 victory for Zamalek. The match featured the first goal in the Egyptian Premier League, scored by Zamalek's Mohamed Amin, and the first hat-trick in the new league, by Zamalek's Saad Rustom.

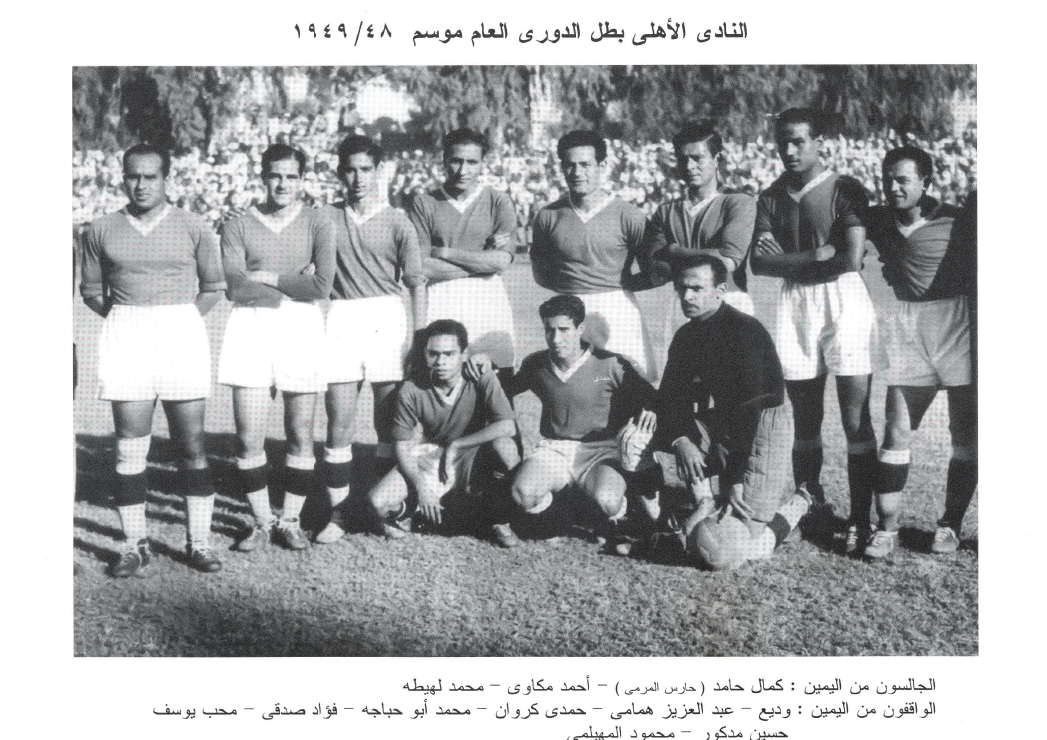
The Al Ahly squad that won the first Egyptian Premier League season.

During this time, Premier League results in matches between clubs from Cairo were counted as Cairo League results as well. The Cairo League ceased play in the 1952–53 season and was once played again in the 1957–58 season and cancelled after that season with a narrow difference in the list of title winners between Cairo rivals, 15 titles for Al Ahly and 14 titles for Zamalek. Zamalek was focused on the Cairo League, winning three consecutive titles from 1949 to 1952, while Al Ahly was dominating the newly born Egyptian League. Despite the importance for this league, few informed and statistics are available.

Few players rose to prominence in Egyptian football in the 1950s, such as; El-Sayed El-Dhizui, Essam Baheeg, Saleh Selim, Hanafy Bastan, Yakan Hussein, Ahmed Mekkawi, Sharif El-Far, Rifaat El-Fanagily, Alaa El-Hamouly, Ad-Diba, Abdou Noshi, Mahmoud El-Gohary, Nour El-Dali and Adel Hekal. Al Ahly won the first three competitions, though in 1949–50 they required a playoff against Tersana SC. The league was not contested during what would have been the 1951–52 season, as Egypt's national team were competing in the 1952 Summer Olympics. The season also did not take place due to the 1952 Egyptian revolution, in which King Farouk was overthrown. Farouk had allowed his name to be used by his favourite club, which quickly renamed itself Zamalek after the revolution.

Gamal Abdel Nasser, who led the coup and took power after Farouk, was a supporter of Al Ahly, and was named club's honorary president soon after he came to power. This increased the intensity of the already fierce Cairo derby between Al-Ahly and Zamalek. Al Ahly won the competition every season until the 1959–60 season, with the majority in a narrow difference with Zamalek. The 1954–55 season was even stopped when Al Ahly conflicted with the Egyptian Football Association and withdrew. No title was awarded.

=== Turbulent Times (1960–1974) ===
In the 1959–60 season, Zamalek finally won their first title after consistently being runners-up, and Tersana were runners-up and Al Ahly finished third. Zamalek won three titles this decade with the help of a new generation led by Hamada Emam, Nabil Nosair, Raafat Attia, Abdou Noshi, Samir Qotb, Yakan Hussein, Ahmed Rifaat, Mahmoud Abou-Regaila and others.

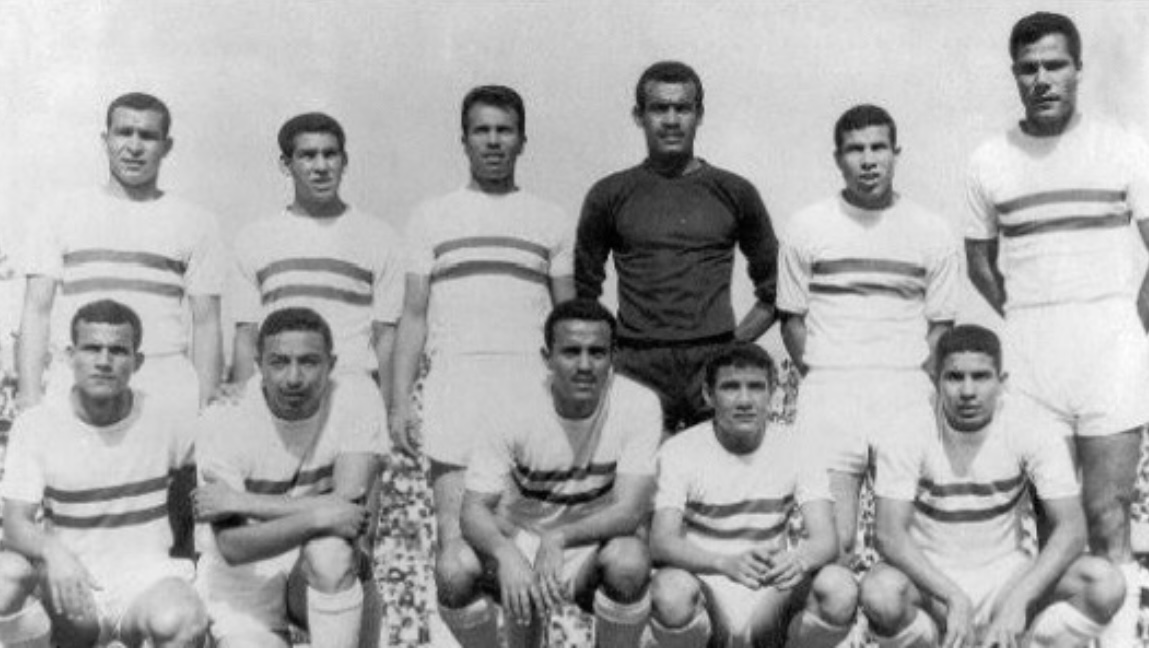
The Zamalek squad that won the 1963–64 Egyptian Premier League season.

Al Ahly's grip on the league loosened; though they did win some titles, in the 1965–66 edition, they finished in 6th out of 12, closer to relegation than to the championship. The decade had five different champions: Ismaily won their first title during this decade, and El-Olympi and Tersana won the league for the only time. Also, the 1962–63 and 1963–64 seasons featured 24 teams, a higher number than ever before.

The league ceased play in 1967 due to the Six-Day War and league play was not resumed until the 1971–72 season. In 1969, Ismaily were allowed to play in the CAF Champions League (then the African Cup of Champion Clubs) as the most recent champions (1966–67 champions). (Note: They won in the 1966–67 season.) They became the first Egyptian club to win that competition in 1969, though both Al Ahly and Zamalek have now won it many more times.

In 1971, the league was restarted, only to be swiftly suspended again due to fighting at a match between Al Ahly and Zamalek. A controversial penalty for Zamalek which was scored by Farouk Gaafar, this resulted in a pitch invasion from Al Ahly fans after Al Ahly goalkeeper Marwan Kanafany asked the fans to protest, and the dispute was so intense that the league was not allowed to continue, and no winner was declared, despite Zamalek finishing 1st in the table. Ghazl El Mahalla won the league in the 1972–73 season for the only time in their history, but the league was then suspended again for the 1973–74 season because of the Yom Kippur War, and replaced with the October League Cup, which was played once and won by Zamalek.

=== Post-war Period (1974–2002) ===
In the 1970s, a new generation of talented players emerged in the Egyptian football such as; Hassan Shehata, Mahmoud El Khatib, Taha Basry, Ekramy, Farouk Gaafar, Abdel Aziz Abdel Shafy, Moustafa Abdou, Hassan El Shazly, Ali Khalil, Ali Abo Gresha, Mussad Nur and others. Although this generation did not achieve positive results with their country's national team in the 1970s, the league was a strong tournament and full of talent.

After the Yom Kippur War, Al Ahly won three championships straight, followed by a single championship for Zamalek. This pattern would continue until 1990: Al Ahly would win many championships, followed by a single win for Zamalek, who won their single title in the 1977–78 season with a narrow lead over Al Ahly. This was only interrupted by Al Mokawloon winning the 1982–83 edition. This is the latest time a team has won the League for the first time. The league returned to its 24-team format for the 1975–76 season, but it quickly reverted to a format featuring between 12 and 16 teams. Tersana were close of winning the 1974–75 season and lost in the final week to Al Ahly with a narrow difference. Top goal scorers fluctuated between Hassan Shehata, Mahmoud El Khatib and Ali Khalil. The 1978–79 season was a 12-team format.

In the 1980s, selected foreign players were chosen to play in the league such as Zamalek's Emmanuel Quarshie, and Al Mokawloon's Joseph-Antoine Bell, until the rules were changed with new limitations on foreign players in 1985. Zamalek and Al Ahly also dominated the CAF Champions League, starting with a 1982 triumph for Al Ahly, and Zamalek in 1984 and 1986, followed by Afro-Asian Club Championship for Zamalek in 1987, which Al Ahly won the next year. Al Ahly also won the African Cup Winners' Cup for three consecutive times from 1984 to 1986. Al Mokawloon won the 1983 African Cup Winners' Cup as well. The Egyptian Premier League became the most successful league in that tournament when Zamalek won in 1993, followed by their win in the CAF Super Cup over Al Ahly in 1994, with two Egyptian contenders for the first time in a continental final.

The league was not played in 1990 because of Egypt's qualification for the 1990 World Cup. After this delay, Ismaily won the 1990–91 season, followed by Zamalek winning twice in a row in the 1991–92 and 1992–93 seasons, and after that Al Ahly won every season until the turn of the century. Zamalek and Ismaily briefly rose in power once again between 2000 and 2004, with Zamalek winning 2000–01, 2002–03 and 2003–04 seasons and Ismaily's 2001–02 win is the latest time that a team other than Zamalek and Al Ahly have won the title.

=== Normalcy, then Disaster (2002–2013) ===
Between 2004 and 2011, Al Ahly won every edition of the Egyptian Premier League, occasionally being challenged by Zamalek or Ismaily. They also continued to dominate the CAF Champions League, becoming the most successful team in the competition.

The league was one of the strongest and best-attended in Africa, ranking near the top of the CAF 5-year ranking since its inception. In 2011, another revolution began, part of the Arab Spring, which eventually resulted in the overthrow of Hosni Mubarak. Football featured heavily in the popular uprising, as ultras from clubs such as Al Ahly took part in the revolution.

==== Port Said Stadium Disaster ====
On 1 February 2012, a riot began at Port Said Stadium at a match between Al Masry and Al Ahly. Fans of Al Masry had brought weapons and stormed the field after their team won the match. These fans then charged Al Ahly fans, who could not flee because the gates behind them were locked. 74 people, mostly fans of Al Ahly, died of stab wounds, concussions, and suffocation. Over 500 people were injured. In the days after the riot, the police response was questioned—they appeared to do little to protect Al Ahly fans. It was widely speculated that the police themselves had incited the riot, perhaps as revenge for the role of Al Ahly ultras in the overthrow of Hosni Mubarak the previous year.

The violence and resulting trial tore Egypt apart for weeks. The season was cancelled, with Haras El Hodoud at the top of the table and possibly heading for a surprise victory. Fans were to be barred from entering matches for years afterwards, but the Egyptian Premier League attempted to get back on its feet the next season.

=== Behind Closed Doors (2013–2021) ===
The 2012–13 season was cancelled as a result of the 2013 Egyptian coup d'état. After this, the Egyptian Premier League gradually returned to power. Al Ahly has won most seasons since 2013, and have also won two CAF Champions Leagues. Zamalek has won two league titles as well. An attempted return of fans was cancelled when a riot at a match between Zamalek and ENPPI resulted in 19 deaths. Fans were finally going to be let back into stadiums when the COVID-19 pandemic began, delaying the return until 2021.

| Teams | 2009–10 | 2010–11 | 2013–14 | 2014–15 | 2015–16 | 2016–17 | 2017–18 | 2018–19 | 2019–20 | 2020–21 | 2021-2022 |
|---|---|---|---|---|---|---|---|---|---|---|---|
| Al Ahly SC | 1 | 1 | 1 | 2 | 1 | 1 | 1 | 1 | 1 | 2 | 3 |
| Zamalek SC | 2 | 2 | 3 | 1 | 2 | 2 | 4 | 2 | 2 | 1 | 1 |
| Ismaily SC | 3 | 3 | 4 | 6 | 6 | 6 | 2 | 7 | 11 | 13 | 11 |
| Pyramids FC | | | | | | | 9 | 3 | 3 | 3 | 2 |
League champions Champions League Confederation Cup

In general, Al Ahly and Zamalek are seen as dominant forces in the league, with budgets that dwarf those of all the other clubs, and Ismaily seen as a distant third place club, occasionally challenging the big teams. In 2018, Al Assiouty Sport were bought by Saudi billionaire Turki Al-Sheikh and renamed Pyramids FC. They have since become a strong competitor in the Premier League and also the CAF Confederation Cup, replacing Ismaily as the third-strongest team in the league.

=== Partial fans return (since 2021) ===
At the beginning of the 2021–22 season, 2000 fans were allowed in every match (1000 per team). The situation was getting better so in May 2022 the number increased to 5000 (2500 per team). The season witnessed an improvement of the Egyptian Premier League, the appearance of teams such as: Cairo-based Future FC and Alexandria-based Pharco FC made the league more challenging and entertaining.

Zamalek defended their title after they won the 2021–22 edition of the league, while Al Ahly witnessed a mass deterioration and even finished the league in third place (behind Pyramids FC and Zamalek) to be out of the top two since 1992 when the club ended the league in the 4th place. Ismaily was on the verge of relegation to the second division but the club eventually managed to improve its results and finished the season in 9th place, while the newly founded Future FC finished in 5th place and managed to qualify for the CAF Confederation Cup, as it was in fourth place in most of the 2021–22 season but lost the position to Tala'ea El Gaish right at the end of the season. At the start of the 2022–23 season, 3000 fans per team were allowed to attend matches.

== Trophy ==
The Egyptian Premier League shield was unveiled in 2023, crowning Al Ahly as its first-ever winners at the end of the 2023/24 season. The shield was designed and manufactured by London-based trophy designers and makers Thomas Lyte.

The shield's design features the wings of Maat, the goddess of truth, justice and fair play. The trophy includes a sundial to symbolise Egypt's connections to cosmology, and a series of motifs inspired by ancient Egyptian art and architecture.

== Competition format and sponsorship ==
=== Competition ===
There are 18 clubs in the Egyptian Premier League. The season lasts from August to May. During the course of the season, each club plays the others twice, once at their home stadium and once at that of their opponents, for a total of 34 games. Teams receive three points for a win and one point for a draw. No points are awarded for a loss. Teams are ranked by total points, then the head-to-head record between the teams in question, then goal difference, and then goals scored. At the end of each season, the club with the most points is crowned champion. If points are equal, the head-to-head record between the teams in question, then goal difference, and then goals scored determine the winner. At the end of the season, the three lowest-placed teams are relegated into the Egyptian Second League. The Egyptian Second League consists of three groups; the winner of each group is promoted. This system has been around since 2015; before then, the number of teams and relegation places was variable.

=== Sponsorship ===
The Egyptian Premier League has been sponsored since 2005. The sponsor has been able to determine the league's sponsorship name. The list below details who the sponsors have been and what they called the competition:

- 2005–07: Vodafone Egyptian Premier League
- 2007–11: Etisalat Egyptian Premier League
- 2011–14: Vodafone Egyptian Premier League
- 2014–2023: Egyptian Premier League (Sponsored by Presentation Sports)
- 2023-2026: Nile League (Sponsored by Nile Developments)
- 2026-Present: ORA League (Sponsored by ORA Developments)

== Qualification for African competitions ==
=== Association ranking for the 2025–26 CAF club season ===
The association ranking for the 2025–26 CAF Champions League and the 2025–26 CAF Confederation Cup was based on results from each CAF club competition from 2020–21 to the 2024–25 season.

Legend

- CL: CAF Champions League
- CC: CAF Confederation Cup
- ≥: Associations points might increase on basis of its clubs performance in 2024–25 CAF club competitions
- Associations ranked 1–12 are eligible to enter two teams in each CAF club competition.

| Rank | | | Association | 2020–21 (× 1) | | 2021–22 (× 2) | | 2022–23 (× 3) | | 2023–24 (× 4) | | 2024–25 (× 5) | | Total |
| 2025 | 2024 | Mvt | Association | CL | CC | CL | CC | CL | CC | CL | CC | CL | CC | Total |
|---|---|---|---|---|---|---|---|---|---|---|---|---|---|---|
| 1 | 1 | — | Egypt | 8 | 3 | 7 | 4 | 8 | 2.5 | 7 | 7 | 10 | 4 | 190.5 |
| 2 | 2 | — | Morocco | 4 | 6 | 9 | 5 | 8 | 2 | 2 | 4 | 5 | 5 | 142 |
| 3 | 4 | +1 | South Africa | 8 | 2 | 5 | 4 | 4 | 3 | 4 | 1.5 | 9 | 3 | 131 |
| 4 | 3 | -1 | Algeria | 6 | 5 | 7 | 1 | 6 | 5 | 2 | 3 | 5 | 5 | 130 |
| 5 | 6 | +1 | Tanzania | 3 | 0.5 | 0 | 2 | 3 | 4 | 6 | 0 | 2 | 4 | 82.5 |
| 6 | 5 | -1 | Tunisia | 4 | 3 | 5 | 1 | 4 | 2 | 6 | 1 | 3 | 0.5 | 82.5 |

== Media coverage ==
As the two most powerful clubs, Al Ahly and Zamalek were, before 2014, allowed to negotiate their own television deals. This allowed them to gain the largest television revenue of any club. In 2014, the league negotiated a £E 70,000,000 ($10,160,000) deal with the state-owned Nile Sport Network. However, the deal still guaranteed a great deal of money for Al Ahly and Zamalek, with 10% of revenue going to the team that had won the most Egyptian Premier Leagues (which is, comfortably, Al Ahly), and 10% going to the teams who appeared on television most frequently. Still, the deal did break the tradition of allowing the two clubs to negotiate deals that produced far more profit than the rest of the clubs in the league.

In 2016, ON Sport TV was granted the rights to televise Egyptian Premier League games. The network is part of the state-owned Egyptian Media Group, which also controls EPL sponsor Presentation Sports. On Sport launched TIME SPORTS to televise the 2019 Africa Cup of Nations which was hosted by Egypt, right and after the end of the tournament, ON sport TV merged with TIME SPORTS and became known as ON TIME Sports.

== Clubs ==
A total of 70 clubs have played in the Egyptian Premier League from its inception in 1948–49 up to and including the 2020–21 season. Al Ahly and Zamalek have been members for every season since its inception, with Al-Ittihad and Al Masry members for all but two seasons.

=== Egyptian Premier League current clubs ===
The following 20 clubs are competing in the Egyptian Premier League as of the 2026–27 season.

- Abou Qir Fertilizers
- Al Ahly
- Al-Ittihad
- Al Masry
- Al Mokawloon Al Arab
- Asyut Petroleum
- Ceramica Cleopatra
- El Gouna
- El Qanah
- El Sharkia Enppi
- Ghazl El Mahalla
- Modern Sport
- National Bank
- Montakhab El Suez Petrojet
- Pyramids
- Smouha
- Tala'ea El Geish
- Wadi Degla
- Zamalek
- ZED

== Teams ==
Locations of the 2026–27 Egyptian Premier League teams

=== Stadiums and locations ===
| Team | Location | Stadium (Note: Main stadiums for the 2026-27 season are listed only. Clubs are allowed to play selected matches at alternative venues; whether due to unavailability, security concerns, or other reasons. For example, Al Ittihad, a team from Alexandria, may play some home games at Borg El Arab Stadium, instead of their regular home stadium, Alexandria Stadium.) | Capacity |
|---|---|---|---|
| Abou Qir Fertilizers | Alexandria | Alexandria Stadium | 19,676 |
| Al Ahly | Gezira | Cairo International Stadium | 75,000 |
| Al Mokawloon Al Arab SC | Nasr City | Osman Ahmed Osman Stadium | 35,000 |
| Asyut Petroleum | Asyut | Asiut University Stadium | 6,000 |
| Ceramica Cleopatra | 6th of October | Osman Ahmed Osman Stadium | 35,000 |
| El Sharkia Enppi | Sharkia | Petrosport Stadium | 16,000 |
| Ghazl El Mahalla | El Mahalla El Kubra | Ghazl El Mahalla Stadium | 14,564 |
| El Gouna | El Gouna | Khaled Bichara Stadium | 12,000 |
| El Qanah | Ismailia (Sheikh Zayed) | Suez Canal Stadium | 22,000 |
| Al Ittihad | Alexandria | Alexandria Stadium | 19,676 |
| Al Masry | Port Said (Al Dawahy) | Suez Stadium | 27,000 |
| Modern Sport | Mokattam | Cairo International Stadium | 75,000 |
| National Bank of Egypt | Agouza | Cairo International Stadium | 75,000 |
| Montakhab El Suez Petrojet | Suez (Faisal) | Cairo Military Academy Stadium | 28,500 |
| Pyramids | New Cairo | 30 June Stadium | 30,000 |
| Smouha | Alexandria | Borg El Arab Stadium | 86,000 |
| Tala'ea El Gaish | Al Waili | Gehaz El Reyada Stadium | 20,000 |
| Wadi Degla SC | Zahraa El Maadi | Petrosport Stadium | 16,000 |
| Zamalek | Mit Okba | Cairo International Stadium | 75,000 |
| ZED | Sheikh Zayed City | Cairo International Stadium | 75,000 |

== List of seasons ==
The following table provides a summary of seasons:

| Season | Champions | Notes |
|---|---|---|
| 1948–49 | Al Ahly (1) | |
| 1949–50 | Al Ahly (2) | |
| 1950–51 | Al Ahly (3) | |
| 1951–52 | Not played | (Note: due to participation in the 1952 Summer Olympics) |
| 1952–53 | Al Ahly (4) | |
| 1953–54 | Al Ahly (5) | |
| 1954–55 | Not finished | (Note: due to refusal of Al Ahly to comply with the Federation's penalty of playing one match away from home) |
| 1955–56 | Al Ahly (6) | |
| 1956–57 | Al Ahly (7) | |
| 1957–58 | Al Ahly (8) | |
| 1958–59 | Al Ahly (9) | |
| 1959–60 | Zamalek (1) | |
| 1960–61 | Al Ahly (10) | |
| 1961–62 | Al Ahly (11) | |
| 1962–63 | Tersana (1) | |
| 1963–64 | Zamalek (2) | |
| 1964–65 | Zamalek (3) | |
| 1965–66 | El Olympi (1) | |
| 1966–67 | Ismaily (1) | |
| 1967–71 | Not played | (Note: due to the Six-Day War) |
| 1971–72 | Not finished | (Note: due to violence during a match between Al Ahly and Zamalek) |
| 1972–73 | Ghazl El Mahalla (1) | |
| 1973–74 | Not finished | (Note: due to the Yom Kippur War) |
| 1974–75 | Al Ahly (12) | |
| 1975–76 | Al Ahly (13) | |
| 1976–77 | Al Ahly (14) | |
| 1977–78 | Zamalek (4) | |
| 1978–79 | Al Ahly (15) | |
| 1979–80 | Al Ahly (16) | |
| 1980–81 | Al Ahly (17) | |
| 1981–82 | Al Ahly (18) | |
| 1982–83 | Al Mokawloon (1) | |
| 1983–84 | Zamalek (5) | |
| 1984–85 | Al Ahly (19) | |
| 1985–86 | Al Ahly (20) | |
| 1986–87 | Al Ahly (21) | |
| 1987–88 | Zamalek (6) | |
| 1988–89 | Al Ahly (22) | |
| 1989–90 | Not finished | (Note: due to preparation for the Egypt national football team for the 1990 FIFA World Cup) |
| 1990–91 | Ismaily (2) | |
| 1991–92 | Zamalek (7) | |
| 1992–93 | Zamalek (8) | |
| 1993–94 | Al Ahly (23) | |
| 1994–95 | Al Ahly (24) | |
| 1995–96 | Al Ahly (25) | |
| 1996–97 | Al Ahly (26) | |
| 1997–98 | Al Ahly (27) | |
| 1998–99 | Al Ahly (28) | |
| 1999–2000 | Al Ahly (29) | |
| 2000–01 | Zamalek (9) | |
| 2001–02 | Ismaily (3) | |
| 2002–03 | Zamalek (10) | |
| 2003–04 | Zamalek (11) | |
| 2004–05 | Al Ahly (30) | |
| 2005–06 | Al Ahly (31) | |
| 2006–07 | Al Ahly (32) | |
| 2007–08 | Al Ahly (33) | |
| 2008–09 | Al Ahly (34) | |
| 2009–10 | Al Ahly (35) | |
| 2010–11 | Al Ahly (36) | |
| 2011–12 | Not finished | (Note: due to the Port Said Stadium riot) |
| 2012–13 | Not finished | (Note: due to the June 2013 Egyptian protests) |
| 2013–14 | Al Ahly (37) | |
| 2014–15 | Zamalek (12) | |
| 2015–16 | Al Ahly (38) | |
| 2016–17 | Al Ahly (39) | |
| 2017–18 | Al Ahly (40) | |
| 2018–19 | Al Ahly (41) | |
| 2019–20 | Al Ahly (42) | |
| 2020–21 | Zamalek (13) | |
| 2021–22 | Zamalek (14) | |
| 2022–23 | Al Ahly (43) | |
| 2023–24 | Al Ahly (44) | |
| 2024–25 | Al Ahly (45) | |
| 2025–26 | Zamalek (15) | |

== Performance ==
=== Performance by club ===
| Club | Winners | Runners-up | Third places | Winning Seasons |
|---|---|---|---|---|
| Al Ahly SC | 45 | 12 | 5 | 1948–49, 1949–50, 1950–51, 1952–53, 1953–54, 1955–56, 1956–57, 1957–58, 1958–59, 1960–61, 1961–62, 1974–75, 1975–76, 1976–77, 1978–79, 1979–80, 1980–81, 1981–82, 1984–85, 1985–86, 1986–87, 1988–89, 1993–94, 1994–95, 1995–96, 1996–97, 1997–98, 1998–99, 1999–00, 2004–05, 2005–06, 2006–07, 2007–08, 2008–09, 2009–10, 2010–11, 2013–14, 2015–16, 2016–17, 2017–18, 2018–19, 2019–20, 2022–23, 2023–24, 2024–25 |
| Zamalek SC | 15 | 34 | 11 | 1959–60, 1963–64, 1964–65, 1977–78, 1983–84, 1987–88, 1991–92, 1992–93, 2000–01, 2002–03, 2003–04, 2014–15, 2020–21, 2021–22, 2025–26 |
| Ismaily SC | 3 | 7 | 17 | 1966–67, 1990–91, 2001–02 |
| Tersana SC | 1 | 5 | 7 | 1962–63 |
| Ghazl El Mahalla SC | 1 | 1 | 5 | 1972–73 |
| Olympic Club | 1 | – | 2 | 1965–66 |
| Al Mokawloon Al Arab SC | 1 | – | 1 | 1982–83 |
| Pyramids FC | – | 5 | 3 | |
| ENPPI SC | – | 1 | 2 | |
| Smouha SC | – | 1 | 1 | |
| Misr Lel Makkasa SC | – | 1 | – | |
| Al Masry SC | – | – | 6 | |
| Al Ittihad Alexandria Club | – | – | 2 | |
| El Qanah FC | – | – | 1 | |
| El Mansoura SC | – | – | 1 | |
| Haras El Hodoud SC | – | – | 1 | |
| Petrojet SC | – | – | 1 | |

Titles won by club (%)
1. Al Ahly – 45 (68.2%)
2. Zamalek – 15 (21.2%)
3. Ismaily – 3 (4.60%)
4. All others – 4 (6.10%)

=== Performance by city ===
| City | Winners | Club(s) |
|---|---|---|
| Cairo | 46 | Al Ahly (45) and Al Mokawloon Al Arab (1) |
| Giza | 16 | Zamalek (15) and Tersana (1) |
| Ismaïlia | 3 | Ismaily (3) |
| El Mahalla El Kubra | 1 | Ghazl El Mahalla (1) |
| Alexandria | 1 | Olympic Club (1) |

=== Doubles ===
Two teams have won the double of the Egyptian Premier League and the Egypt Cup :

| Club | Number | Seasons |
|---|---|---|
| Al Ahly | 16 | 1948–49, 1949–50, 1950–51, 1952–53, 1955–56, 1957–58, 1960–61, 1980–81, 1984–85, 1988–89, 1995–96, 2005–06, 2006–07, 2016–17, 2019–20, 2022–23 |
| Zamalek | 4 | 1959–60, 1987–88, 2014–15, 2020–21 |

== Statistics ==
=== All seasons top goalscorers ===
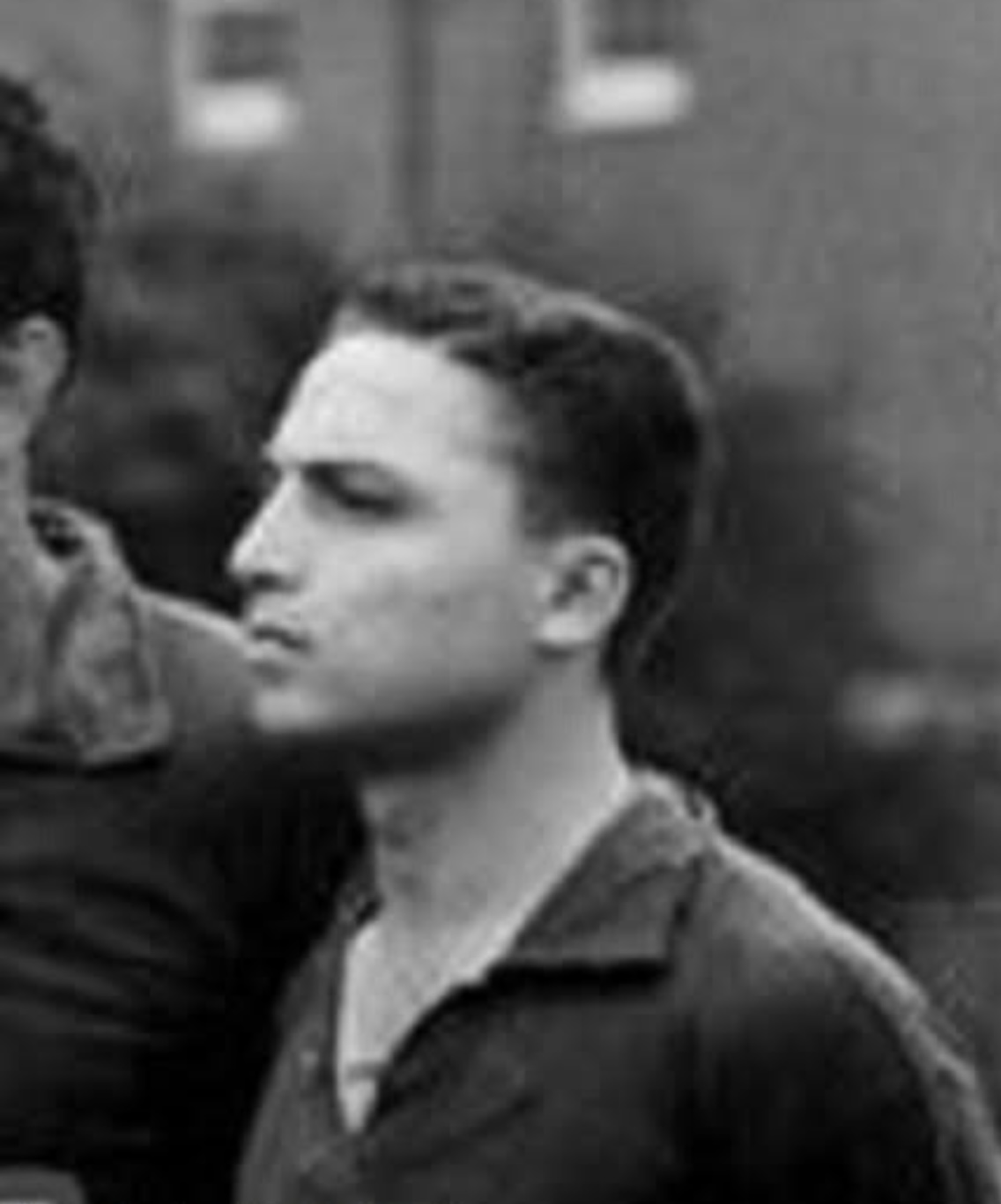
Ad-Diba, first season's top scorer.

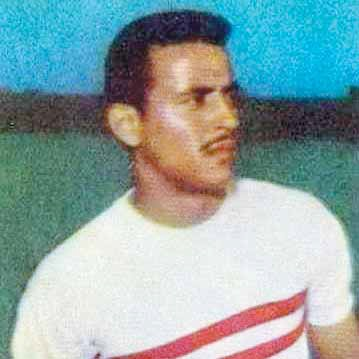
Ali Mohsen, the first non-Egyptian top scorer.

Ahmed El-Kass, three consecutive times, top scorer.

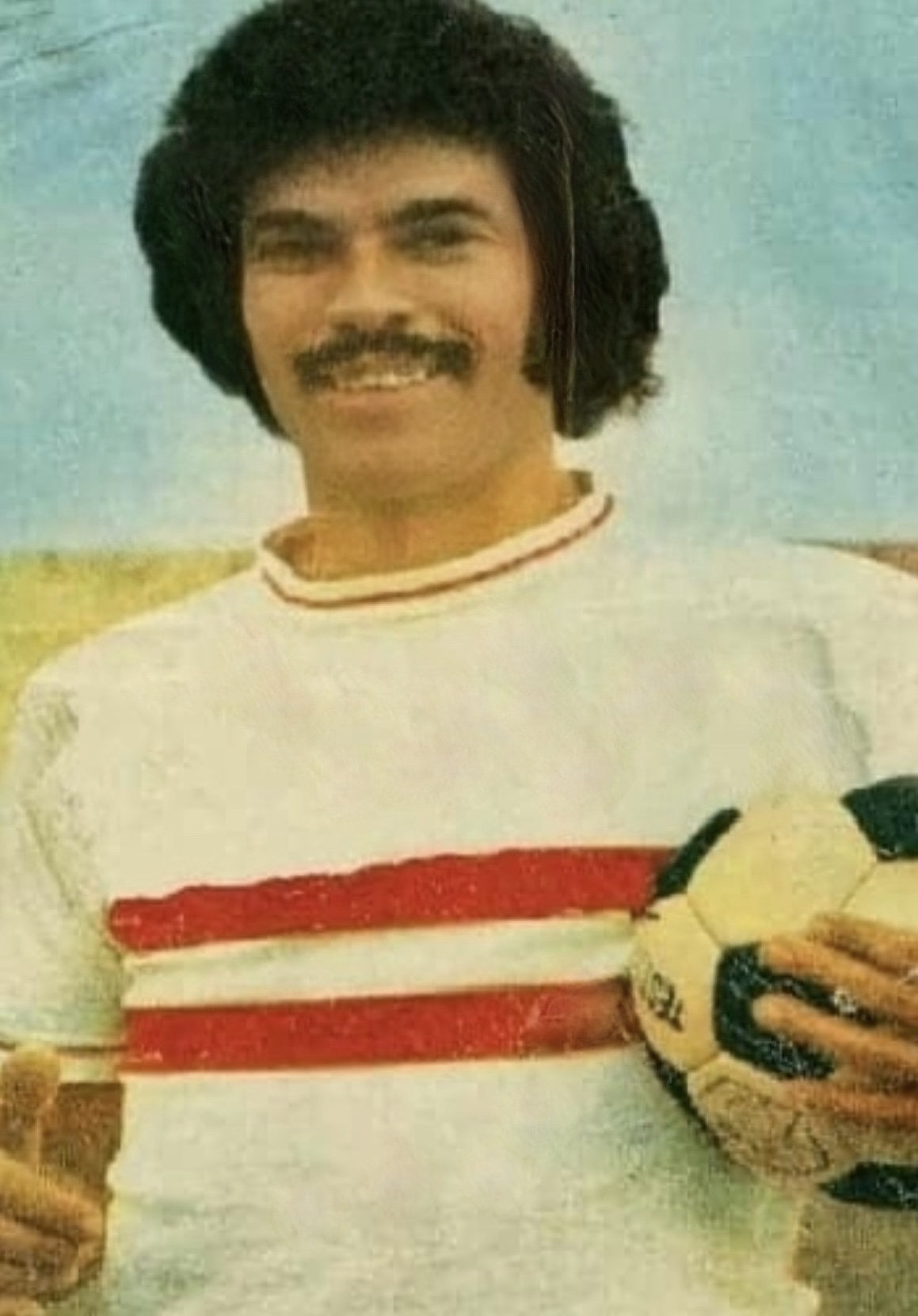
Hassan Shehata, twice top scorer.

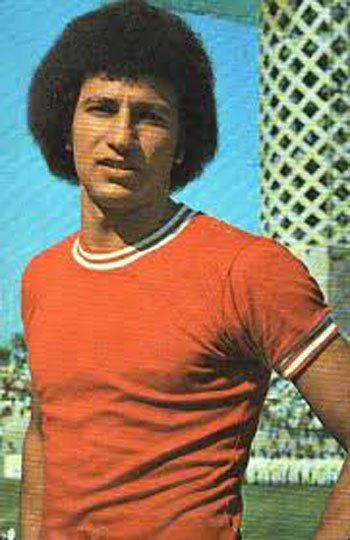
Mahmoud El Khatib, twice top scorer.

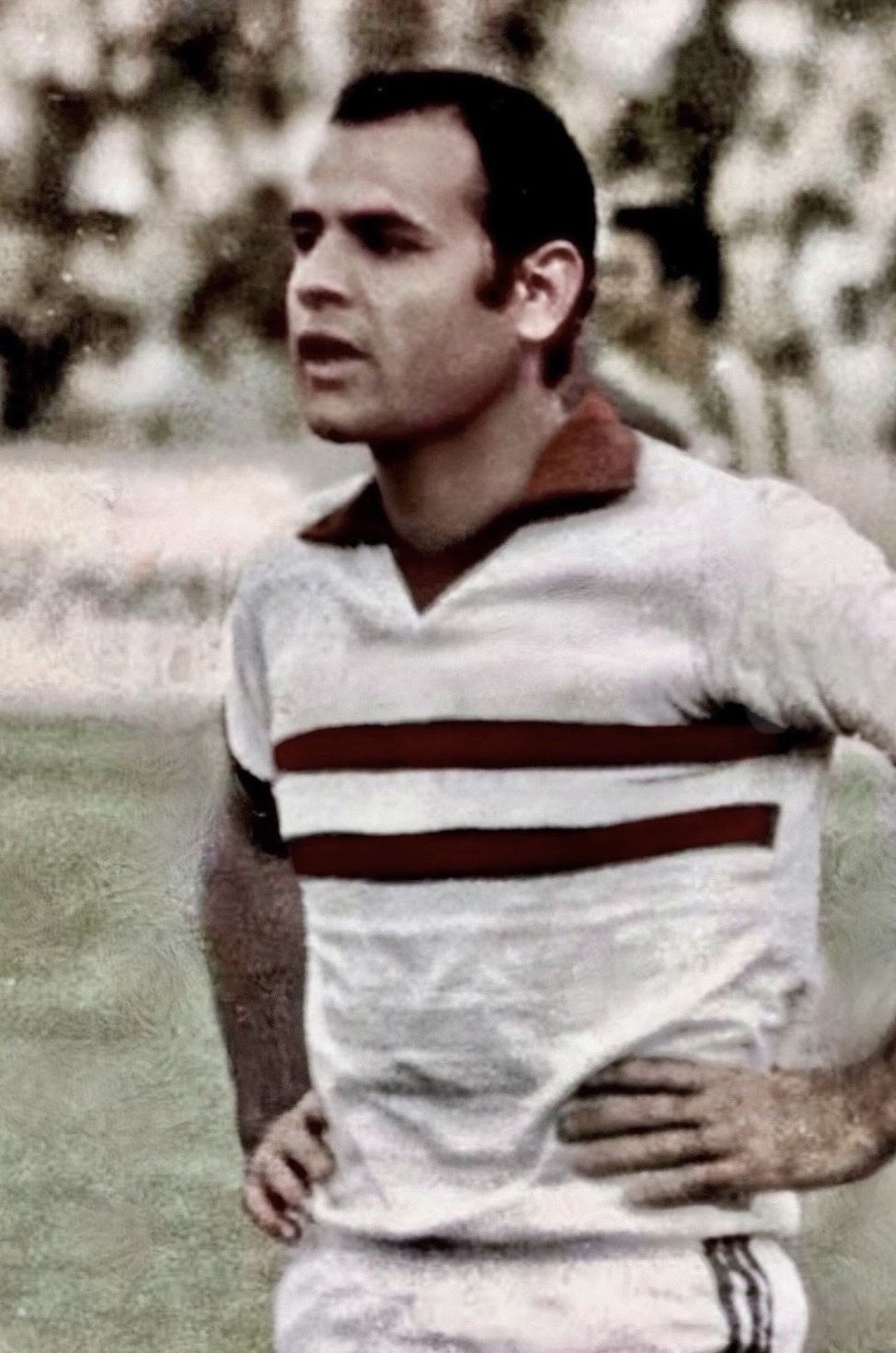
Ali Khalil, twice top scorer.

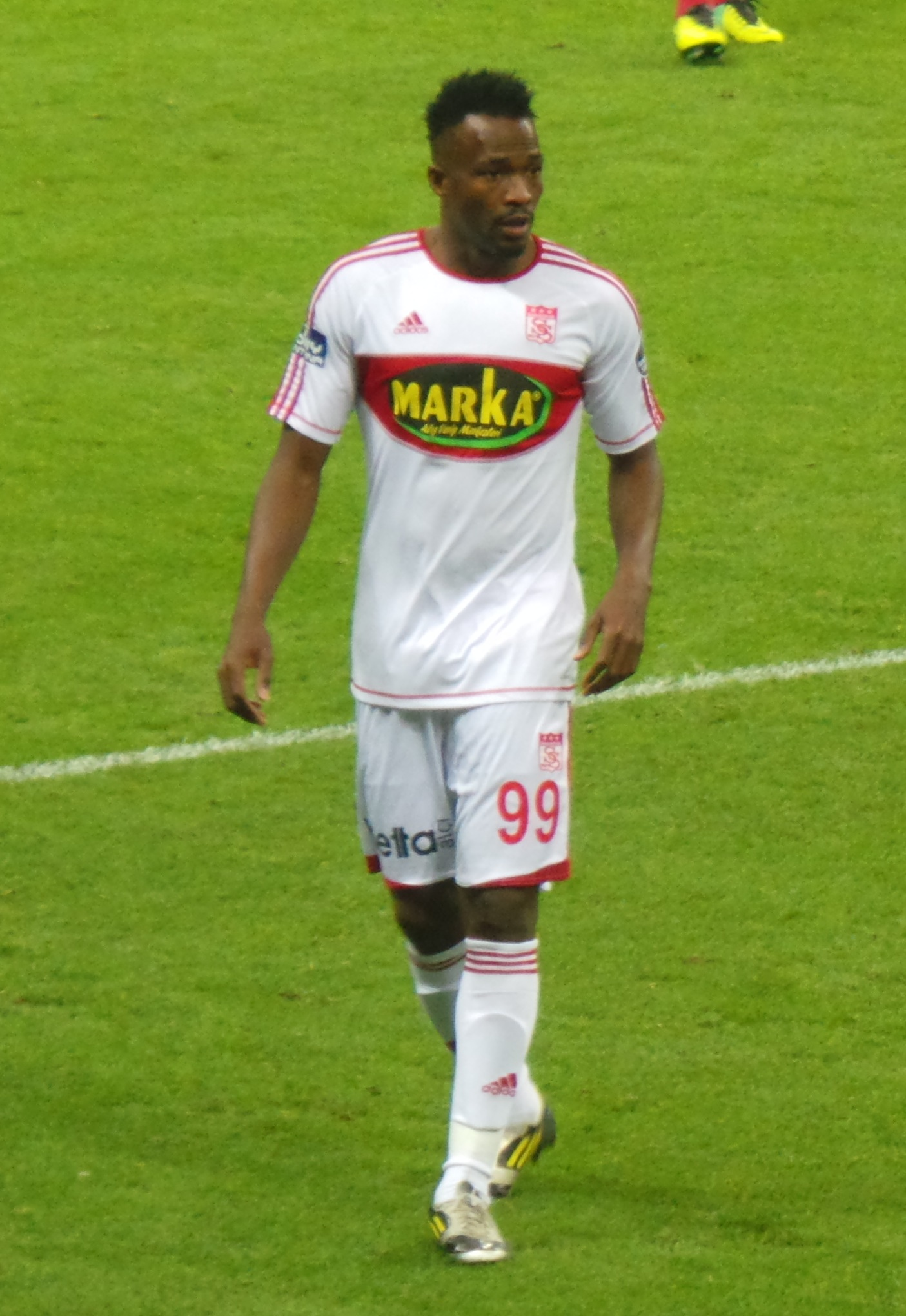
John Utaka, first non-Arab top scorer.

| Season | Player | Club | Goals |
|---|---|---|---|
| 1948–49 | (Egypt) Ad-Diba | El Ittihad El Sakandary | 15 |
| 1948–49 | (Egypt) El-Sayed El-Dhizui | Al Masry | 15 |
| 1949–50 | (Egypt) El-Sayed El-Dhizui | Al Masry | 13 |
| 1950–51 | (Egypt) El-Sayed El-Dhizui | Al Masry | 13 |
| 1952–53 | (Egypt) Ahmed Mekkawi | Al Ahly | 12 |
| 1953–54 | (Egypt) Abdel Nabi | Tersana | 18 |
| 1955–56 | (Egypt) Sayed Saleh | Al Ahly | 12 |
| 1956–57 | (Egypt) Hamdi Abdel Fattah | Tersana | 22 |
| 1957–58 | (Egypt) Hamdi Abdel Fattah | Tersana | 19 |
| 1958–59 | (Egypt) El-Sayed El-Dhizui | Al Ahly | 16 |
| 1959–60 | (Egypt) Hamdi Abdel Fattah | Tersana | 15 |
| 1960–61 | (Yemen) Ali Mohsen | Zamalek | 16 |
| 1961–62 | (Egypt) Moustafa Reyadh | Tersana | 18 |
| 1962–63 | (Egypt) Hassan El-Shazly | Tersana | 32 |
| 1963–64 | (Egypt) Moustafa Reyadh | Tersana | 27 |
| 1964–65 | (Egypt) Hassan El-Shazly | Tersana | 23 |
| 1965–66 | (Egypt) Hassan El-Shazly | Tersana | 16 |
| 1966–67 | (Egypt) Ali Abo Gresha | Ismaily | 15 |
| 1972–73 | (Egypt) Omasha Omasha | Ghazl El Mahalla | 11 |
| 1974–75 | (Egypt) Hassan El-Shazly | Tersana | 34 |
| 1975–76 | (Egypt) Ossama Khalil | Ismaily | 17 |
| 1976–77 | (Egypt) Ali Khalil | Zamalek | 17 |
| 1976–77 | (Egypt) Hassan Shehata | Zamalek | 17 |
| 1977–78 | (Egypt) Mahmoud El Khatib | Al Ahly | 11 |
| 1978–79 | (Egypt) Ali Khalil | Zamalek | 12 |
| 1979–80 | (Egypt) Hassan Shehata | Zamalek | 14 |
| 1980–81 | (Egypt) Mahmoud El Khatib | Al Ahly | 11 |
| 1981–82 | (Egypt) Gamal Gouda | Al Masry | 8 |
| 1982–83 | (Egypt) Mahmoud El-Mashaqui | Ghazl El Mahalla | 9 |
| 1983–84 | (Egypt) Ayman Shawky | Koroum | 8 |
| 1984–85 | (Egypt) Mohamed Hazem | Ismaily | 11 |
| 1985–86 | (Egypt) Mohamed Hazem | Ismaily | 11 |
| 1986–87 | (Egypt) Emad Soliman | Ismaily | 11 |
| 1987–88 | (Egypt) Gamal Abdel-Hameed | Zamalek | 11 |
| 1988–89 | (Egypt) Mahmoud El-Mashaqui | Ghazl El Mahalla | 11 |
| 1990–91 | (Egypt) Mohamed Ramadan | Al Ahly | 14 |
| 1991–92 | (Egypt) Ahmed El-Kass | El Olympi | 14 |
| 1992–93 | (Egypt) Ahmed El-Kass | El Olympi | 16 |
| 1993–94 | (Egypt) Ahmed El-Kass | El Olympi | 15 |
| 1993–94 | (Egypt) Bashir Abdel Samad | Ismaily | 15 |
| 1994–95 | (Egypt) Abdullah El-Sawy | El Qannah | 10 |
| 1994–95 | (Egypt) Ahmed Sary | El Ittihad El Sakandary | 10 |
| 1995–96 | (Egypt) Mohamed Salah Abo Gresha | Ismaily | 14 |
| 1996–97 | (Egypt) Ayman Moheb | El Mansoura | 17 |
| 1997–98 | (Egypt) Abdul-Hamid Bassiouny | Zamalek | 15 |
| 1998–99 | (Egypt) Hossam Hassan | Al Ahly | 15 |
| 1999–2000 | (Nigeria) John Utaka | Ismaily | 17 |
| 2000–01 | (Egypt) Tarek El-Said | Zamalek | 13 |
| 2001–02 | (Egypt) Hossam Hassan | Zamalek | 18 |
| 2002–03 | (Egypt) Ahmad Belal | Al Ahly | 19 |
| 2003–04 | (Egypt) Abdel Halim Ali | Zamalek | 20 |
| 2004–05 | (Egypt) Emad Moteab | Al Ahly | 15 |
| 2005–06 | (Egypt) Mohamed Aboutrika | Al Ahly | 18 |
| 2006–07 | (Angola) Flávio Amado | Al Ahly | 17 |
| 2007–08 | (Egypt) Alaa Ibrahim | Petrojet | 15 |
| 2008–09 | (Ghana) Ernest Papa Arko | Tala'ea El Gaish | 12 |
| 2008–09 | (Angola) Flávio Amado | Al Ahly | 12 |
| 2009–10 | (Nigeria) Minusu Buba | Ittihad El Shorta | 14 |
| 2010–11 | (Egypt) Ahmed Abd El-Zaher | ENPPI | 13 |
| 2010–11 | (Egypt) Shikabala | Zamalek | 13 |
| 2013–14 | (Ghana) John Antwi | Ismaily | 11 |
| 2014–15 | (Egypt) Hossam Salama | El-Dakhleya | 20 |
| 2015–16 | (Egypt) Hossam Salama | Smouha | 17 |
| 2016–17 | (Egypt) Ahmed El Sheikh | Misr Lel Makasa | 17 |
| 2017–18 | (Morocco) Walid Azaro | Al Ahly | 18 |
| 2018–19 | (Egypt) Ahmed Ali | Al Mokawloon | 18 |
| 2019–20 | (Egypt) Abdallah El Said | Pyramids | 17 |
| 2020–21 | (Egypt) Mohamed Sherif | Al Ahly | 21 |
| 2021–22 | (Egypt) Ahmed Sayed (Zizo) | Zamalek | 19 |
| 2022–23 | (Angola) Mabululu | El Ittihad El Sakandary | 16 |
| 2023–24 | (Palestine) Wessam Abou Ali | Al Ahly | 18 |
| 2024–25 | (Egypt) Emam Ashour | Al Ahly | 13 |
| 2025–26 | (Egypt) Ahmed Yasser Rayyan | National Bank of Egypt | 13 |

=== All time top goalscorers ===
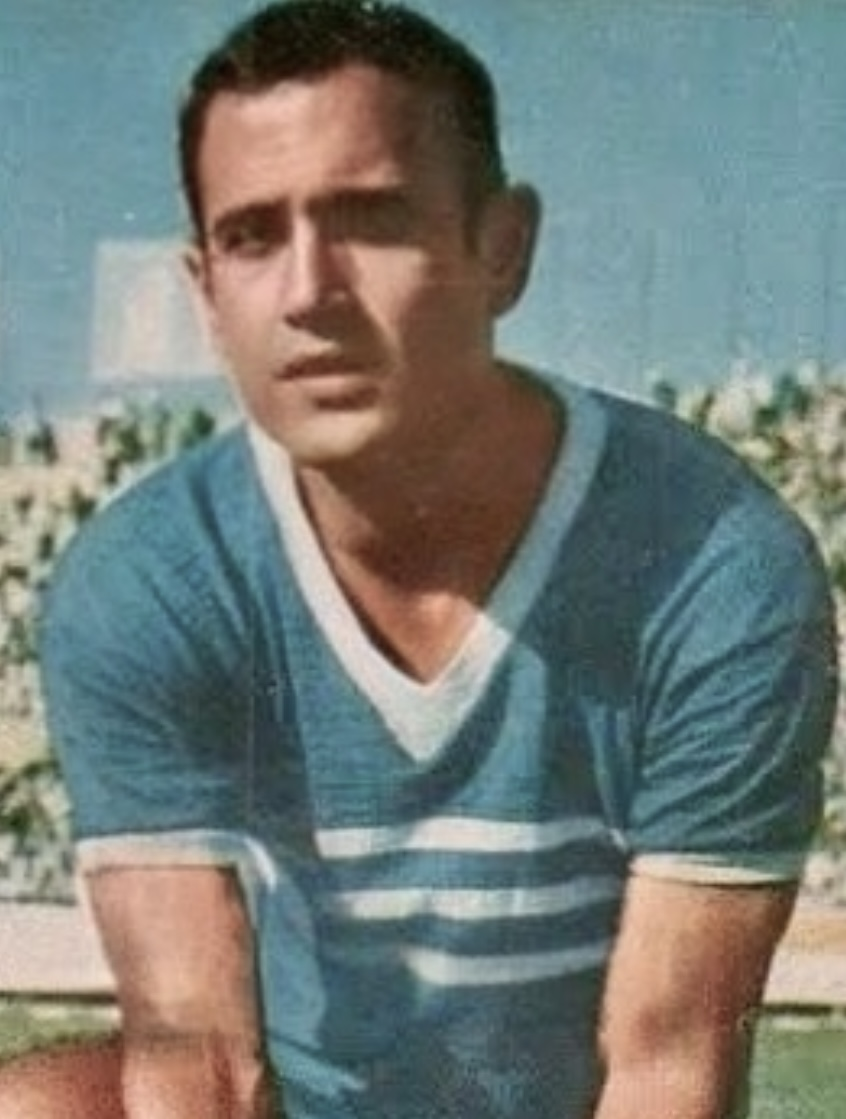
Hassan El-Shazly, all-time top scorer.

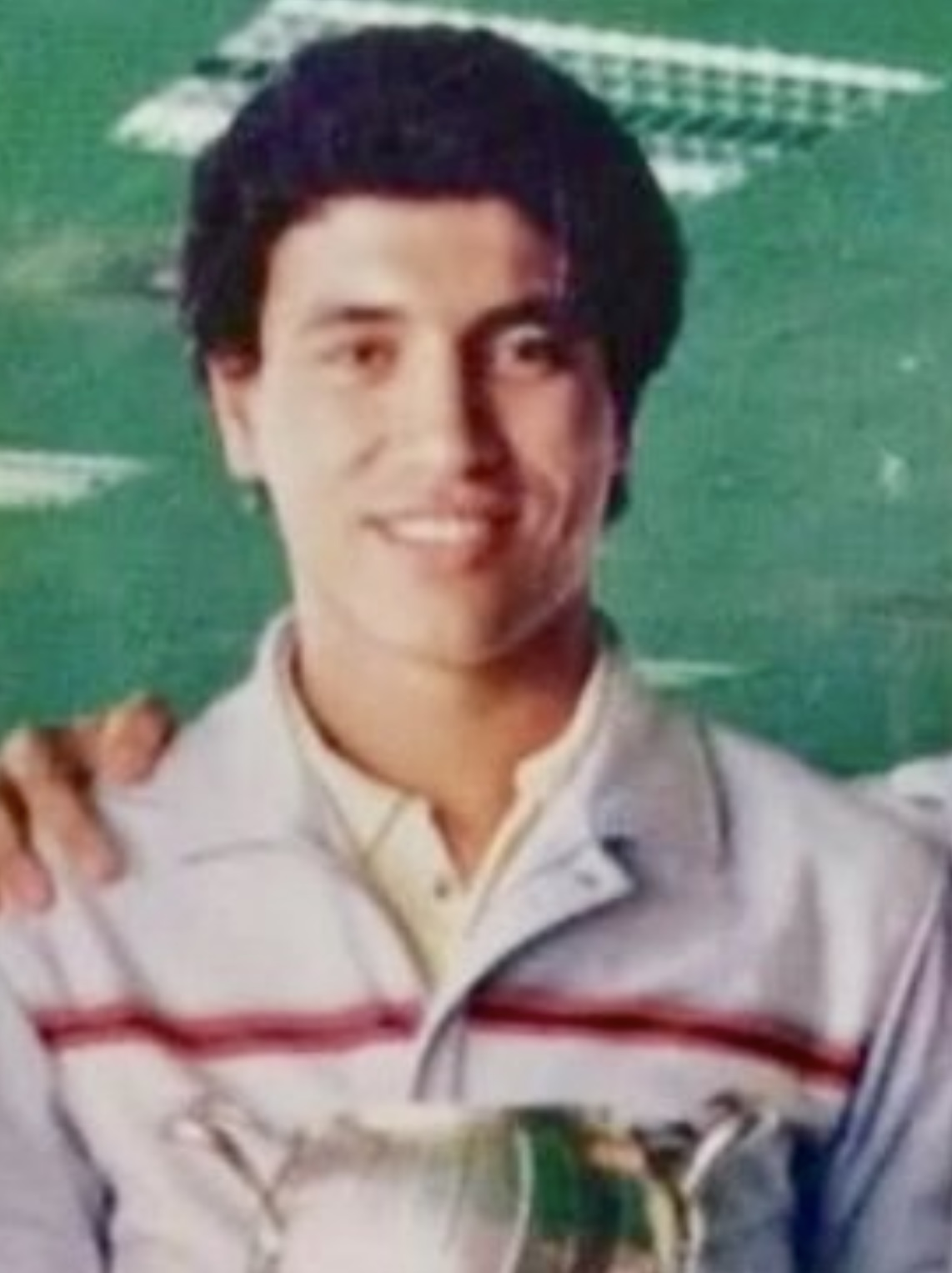
Gamal Abdel-Hamid, ninth all-time top scorer.

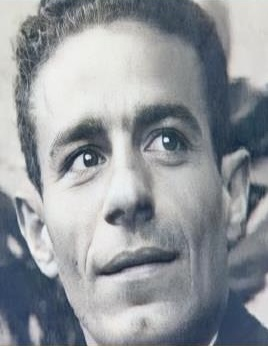
El-Sayed El-Dhizwi, fifth all-time top scorer.

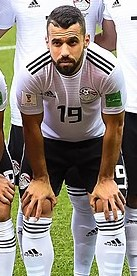
Abdallah El Said, scored the most goals of any active player and the third all-time top scorer.

Last updated 1 October 2025.

| No. | Player | Teams | Goals |
|---|---|---|---|
| 1 | Hassan El-Shazly | Tersana | 173 |
| 2 | Hossam Hassan | Al Ahly / Zamalek / Al Masry / Tersana / Al Ittihad | 168 |
| 3 | Abdallah Said | Ismaily / Al Ahly / Pyramids / Zamalek | 133 |
| 4 | Moustafa Reyadh | Tersana | 123 |
| 5 | El-Sayed El-Dhizui | Al Masry / Al Ahly | 112 |
| 6 | Mahmoud El Khatib | Al Ahly | 109 |
| 7 | Ahmed El-Kass | El Olympi / Zamalek / Al Ittihad | 107 |
| 8 | Mohamed Aboutrika | Tersana / Al Ahly | 106 |
| 9 | Gamal Abdel-Hamid | Al Ahly / Zamalek | 101 |

=== All time most appearances ===
| No. | Player | Matches |
|---|---|---|
| 1 | Abdallah Said | 481 |
| 2 | Mohamed Abdel Monsef | 458 |
| 3 | Essam El Hadary | 455 |
| 4 | Ahmed Shedid Qenawi | 421 |
| 5 | Hossam Hassan | 401 |
| 6 | El Hany Soliman | 390 |
| 7 | Nour El Sayed | 380 |
| 8 | Ahmed Fathy | 374 |
| 9 | Mohamed El Shenawy | 352 |
| 9 | Amr El Solia | 352 |

== See also ==
- Football in Egypt
