= 1952–53 Egyptian Premier League =

Egyptian Premier League
- Season: 1952–53
- Dates: 14 November 1952 – 2 August 1953
- Champions: Al Ahly (4th title)
- Relegated: Port Fuad relegated after playing playoffs with Ismaily and Teram
- Matches played: 89
- Goals scored: 322 (3.62 per match)
- Top goalscorer: El-Dhizui (18 goals)
- Biggest home win: Zamalek 6–0 El Sekka El Hadid (30 November 1952)
- Biggest away win: Zamalek 1–4 Al Masry (10 April 1953)
- Highest scoring: Teram 4–7 Ismaily (24 May 1953)
- All statistics correct as of 30 July 2020.

The 1952–53 Egyptian Premier League started in November 1952. Al Ahly were crowned champions for the fourth time in the club's history.

== League table ==
Pos	Club	Pld	W	D	L	F	A	Pts
1	Al Ahly (C)	18	12	4	2	37	23	28
2	Zamalek	18	10	6	2	33	19	26
3	Al Masry	18	10	4	4	40	23	24
4	Tersana SC	18	9	2	7	42	38	20
5	El Sekka El Hadid	18	7	5	6	32	33	19
6	Al Ittihad	18	8	2	8	36	32	18
7	Olympic	18	6	2	10	29	35	14
8	Port Fuad (R)	18	5	3	10	22	31	13
9	Ismaily SC	18	4	3	11	27	41	11
10	Teram	18	1	5	12	19	42	7

(C)= Champions, (R)= Relegated, Pld = Matches played; W = Matches won; D = Matches drawn; L = Matches lost; F = Goals for; A = Goals against; ± = Goal difference; Pts = Points.
