= 1958–59 Egyptian Premier League =

Egyptian Premier League
- Season: 1958–59
- Dates: 3 October 1958 – 17 April 1959
- Champions: Al Ahly (9th title)
- Relegated: Teram
- Matches played: 90
- Goals scored: 282 (3.13 per match)
- Top goalscorer: El-Sayed El-Dhizui (15goals)
- Biggest home win: Al Ahly 7–0 Teram (25 January 1959)
- Biggest away win: Tersana 0–5 Al Ahly (3 October 1958)
- Highest scoring: Al Ahly 6–3 Tersana (11 January 1959)

The 1958–59 Egyptian Premier League, was the ninth season of the Egyptian Premier League, the top Egyptian professional league for association football clubs, since its establishment in 1948. The season started on 3 October 1958 and concluded on 17 April 1959. Defending champions Al Ahly won their 9th consecutive and 9th overall Egyptian Premier League title in the club history.

== League table ==
| Pos | Club | Pld | W | D | L | F | A | Pts |
|---|---|---|---|---|---|---|---|---|
| 1 | Al Ahly (C) | 18 | 14 | 3 | 1 | 55 | 13 | 31 |
| 2 | Zamalek | 18 | 9 | 5 | 4 | 33 | 22 | 23 |
| 3 | Tersana | 18 | 7 | 7 | 4 | 32 | 24 | 21 |
| 4 | Olympic | 18 | 8 | 5 | 5 | 31 | 29 | 21 |
| 5 | Suez | 18 | 7 | 5 | 6 | 21 | 20 | 19 |
| 6 | El Qanah | 18 | 5 | 7 | 6 | 22 | 26 | 17 |
| 7 | El Sekka El Hadid | 18 | 5 | 4 | 9 | 30 | 38 | 14 |
| 8 | Tanta | 18 | 4 | 5 | 9 | 20 | 34 | 13 |
| 9 | Ghazl El Mahalla | 18 | 3 | 6 | 9 | 20 | 35 | 12 |
| 10 | Teram (R) | 18 | 3 | 3 | 12 | 18 | 41 | 9 |

(C)= Champions, (R)= Relegated, Pld = Matches played; W = Matches won; D = Matches drawn; L = Matches lost; F = Goals for; A = Goals against; ± = Goal difference; Pts = Points.

== Teams ==
Locations of the 1958–59 Egyptian Premier League teams
