= Mohamed Hamdy =

Mohamed Hamdy may refer to:

- Mohamed Hamdy Zaky (born 1991), Egyptian football striker
- Mohamed Hamdy (footballer, born 1995), Egyptian football defender
- Mohamed Hamdy (footballer, born 2003), Egyptian football defender

== See also ==
- Mahmoud Hamdy (born 1995), or El-Wensh, Egyptian football defender
- Mohamed Hamdi (disambiguation)
