= 1959–60 Egyptian Premier League =

Egyptian Premier League
- Season: 1959–60
- Dates: 11 September 1959 – 17 June 1960
- Champions: Zamalek (1st title)
- Relegated: Al Ittihad
- Matches played: 92
- Goals scored: 245 (2.66 per match)
- Top goalscorer: Hamdi Abdel Fattah (14 goals)
- Biggest home win: Tersana 6–1 Suez (29 May 1960)
- Biggest away win: Al Ittihad 1–4 Zamalek (25 September 1959)
- Highest scoring: Zamalek 6–2 Olympic (16 October 1959)

The 1959–60 Egyptian Premier League, was the tenth season of the Egyptian Premier League, the top Egyptian professional league for association football clubs, since its establishment in 1948. The season started on 11 September 1959 and concluded on 17 June 1960. Zamalek won the league for the first time.

== League table ==
| Pos | Club | Pld | W | D | L | F | A | Pts |
|---|---|---|---|---|---|---|---|---|
| 1 | Zamalek (C) | 18 | 12 | 4 | 2 | 38 | 14 | 28 |
| 2 | Tersana | 18 | 11 | 5 | 2 | 39 | 20 | 27 |
| 3 | Al Ahly | 18 | 8 | 6 | 4 | 29 | 16 | 22 |
| 4 | El Qanah | 18 | 4 | 11 | 3 | 22 | 20 | 19 |
| 5 | Ghazl El Mahalla | 18 | 5 | 7 | 6 | 16 | 17 | 17 |
| 6 | Tanta | 18 | 5 | 6 | 7 | 18 | 25 | 16 |
| 7 | Suez | 18 | 4 | 7 | 7 | 19 | 24 | 15 |
| 8 | Olympic | 18 | 5 | 4 | 9 | 24 | 38 | 14 |
| 9 | El Sekka El Hadid | 18 | 3 | 5 | 10 | 21 | 38 | 11 |
| 10 | Al Ittihad (R) | 18 | 4 | 3 | 11 | 16 | 31 | 11 |

(C)= Champions, (R)= Relegated, Pld = Matches played; W = Matches won; D = Matches drawn; L = Matches lost; F = Goals for; A = Goals against; ± = Goal difference; Pts = Points.

== Top goalscorers ==
| Rank | Player | Club | Goals |
|---|---|---|---|
| 1 | (United Arab Republic) Hamdi Abdel Fattah | Tersana | 14 |
| 2 | (United Arab Republic) Raafat Attia | Zamalek | 10 |
| 3 | (United Arab Republic) Badawi Abdel Fattah | Tersana | 10 |
| 4 | (United Arab Republic) Abou Sereaa | El Sekka El Hadid | 10 |
| 5 | (United Arab Republic) Essam Baheeg | Zamalek | 8 |

== Teams ==
Locations of the 1959–60 Egyptian Premier League teams
