= 1961–62 Egyptian Premier League =

Egyptian Premier League
- Season: 1961–62
- Dates: 6 October 1961 – 22 April 1962
- Champions: Ahly (11th title)
- Relegated: Relegation was cancelled
- Matches played: 90
- Goals scored: 274 (3.04 per match)
- Top goalscorer: Moustafa Reyadh (20 goals)
- Biggest home win: Zamalek 7–0 Al Ittihad (12 November 1961)
- Biggest away win: Zamalek 0–3 Al Ahly (20 April 1962)
- Highest scoring: Zamalek 7–0 Al Ittihad (12 November 1961)

The 1961–62 Egyptian Premier League, was the 12th season of the Egyptian Premier League, the top Egyptian professional league for association football clubs, since its establishment in 1948. The season started on 6 October 1961 and concluded on 22 April 1962. Al Ahly won the league for the eleventh time in the club's history.

== League table ==
Pos	Club	Pld	W	D	L	F	A	Pts
1	Al Ahly (C)	18	13	3	2	37	16	29
2	Zamalek	18	12	2	4	35	15	26
3	Tersana	18	12	1	5	36	21	22
4	El Qanah	18	11	2	5	36	20	24
5	Al Masry	18	5	6	7	29	32	16
6	Suez	18	7	2	9	24	27	16
7	Al Ittihad	18	5	3	10	23	42	13
8	Tanta	18	4	4	10	16	28	12
9	Olympic	18	3	5	10	21	39	11
10	El Sekka El Hadid	18	1	6	11	17	34	8

(C)= Champions, (R)= Relegated, Pld = Matches played; W = Matches won; D = Matches drawn; L = Matches lost; F = Goals for; A = Goals against; ± = Goal difference; Pts = Points.

== Top goalscorers ==
Rank	Player	Club	Goals
1	(United Arab Republic) Moustafa Reyadh	Tersana	20
2	(United Arab Republic) Loufa	El Qanah	14
3	(United Arab Republic) Taha Ismail	Al Ahly	11
4	(United Arab Republic) Badawi Abdel Fattah	Tersana	8
5	(United Arab Republic) Adel Zain	El Qanah	8

== Teams ==
Locations of the 1961–62 Egyptian Premier League teams
