= 1953–54 Egyptian Premier League =

Egyptian Premier League
- Season: 1953–54
- Dates: 27 September 1953 – 23 May 1954
- Champions: Al Ahly (5th title)
- Relegated: El Sekka El Hadid
- Matches: 90
- Goals: 314 (3.49 per match)
- Top goalscorer: Abdel Nabi Mahmoud (21 goals)
- Biggest home win: Tersana 9–1 Olympic (19 March 1954)
- Biggest away win: Al Ittihad 0–4 Tersana (18 April 1954)
- Highest scoring: Tersana 9–1 Olympic (19 March 1954)

The 1953–54 Egyptian Premier League, was the fifth season of the Egyptian Premier League, the top Egyptian professional league for association football clubs, since its establishment in 1948. The season started on 27 September 1953 and concluded on 23 May 1954. El Qanah entered as the promoted team from the Egyptian Second Division. They replaced Port Fuad, who was relegated.

Defending champions Al Ahly won their 5th consecutive and 5th overall Egyptian Premier League title in the club's history.

== League table ==
Pos	Club	Pld	W	D	L	F	A	Pts
1	Al Ahly (C)	18	11	4	3	44	27	26
2	Zamalek	18	9	6	3	34	22	24
3	Tersana SC	18	10	1	7	54	27	21
4	Ismaily SC	18	7	4	7	27	28	18
5	Al Masry	18	5	7	6	23	27	17
6	Al Ittihad	18	5	7	6	27	34	17
7	El Qanah	18	7	2	9	30	30	16
8	Teram	18	6	4	8	25	33	16
9	Olympic	18	5	3	10	33	48	13
10	El Sekka El Hadid (R)	18	4	4	10	17	38	12

(C)= Champions, (R)= Relegated, Pld = Matches played; W = Matches won; D = Matches drawn; L = Matches lost; F = Goals for; A = Goals against; ± = Goal difference; Pts = Points.
