= 1955–56 Egyptian Premier League =

Egyptian Premier League
- Season: 1955–56
- Dates: 23 September 1955 – 23 July 1956
- Champions: Al Ahly (6th title)
- Matches: 110
- Goals: 319 (2.9 per match)
- Top goalscorer: Salah Abo Gresha (13 goals)
- Biggest home win: Al Ahly 6–1 Tersana (15 January 1956)
- Biggest away win: Suez 1–4 Al Masry (15 September 1955)
- Highest scoring: El Mansoura SC 4–4 Al Ittihad (14 October 1955)
- All statistics correct as of 31 July 2020.

The 1955–56 Egyptian Premier League, was the sixth season of the Egyptian Premier League, the top Egyptian professional league for association football clubs, since its establishment in 1948. The season started on 23 September 1955 and concluded on 23 July 1956. Defending champions Al Ahly won their 6th consecutive and 6th overall Egyptian Premier League title in the club history.

== League table ==
Pos	Club	Pld	W	D	L	F	A	Pts
1	Al Ahly (C)	20	12	4	4	43	20	28
2	Zamalek	20	10	7	3	31	15	27
3	El Qanah	20	10	6	4	34	22	26
4	Al Ittihad	20	8	7	5	42	36	23
5	Ismaily	20	9	4	7	43	27	22
6	Al Masry	20	7	8	7	33	36	20
7	Suez	20	7	4	9	22	29	18
8	Tersana	20	4	8	8	22	31	16
9	Olympic	20	3	7	10	16	29	16
10	Teram	20	3	7	10	20	31	13
11	El Mansoura	20	1	9	10	22	43	11

(C)= Champions, (R)= Relegated, Pld = Matches played; W = Matches won; D = Matches drawn; L = Matches lost; F = Goals for; A = Goals against; ± = Goal difference; Pts = Points.
