= Mohamed Hamdi =

Mohamed Hamdi may refer to:

- Sayed Hamdi, Egyptian gymnast
- Mohamed Hamdi (footballer, born 2000), Egyptian footballer
- Mohamed Hamdi Messi (born 2003), Egyptian footballer

== See also ==
- Mohamed Hamdy (disambiguation)
