= Taha Ismail =

Egyptian footballer (born 1939)

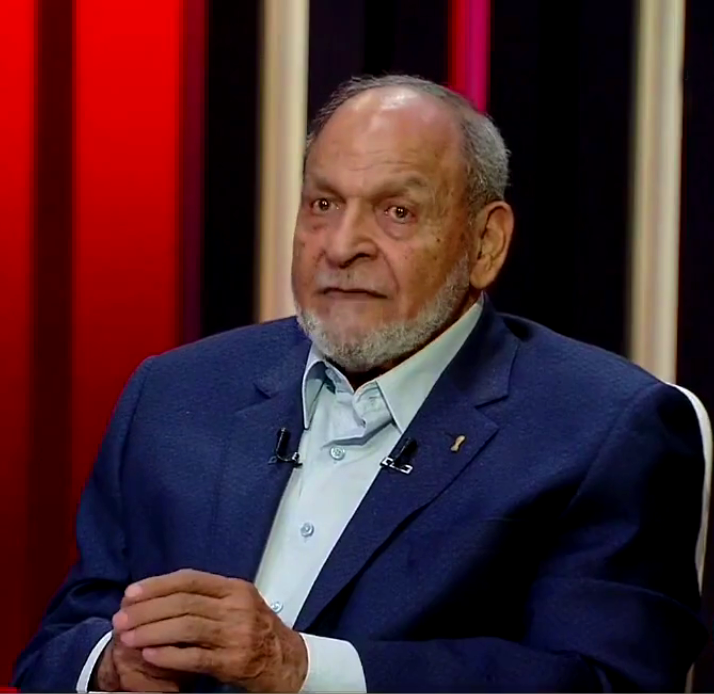
- Ismail in 2022

Personal information
- Full name: Taha Mahmood Ismail Badran
- Date of birth: 8 February 1939 (age 87)
- Place of birth: Egypt
- Position: Forward

Senior career*
Years	Team	Apps	(Gls)
1957–1970	Al-Ahly	166	(64)

International career
1959–1967	Egypt		

Managerial career
- 1972: Saudi Arabia
- 1972–1974: Al-Ahli Jeddah
- 1978: Egypt
- 1982–1983: Al-Wehda
- 1994: Egypt
- 1998–1999: Ismaily
Medal record
Men's football
Representing United Arab Republic
Africa Cup of Nations
Winner	1959 United Arab Republic
Runner-up	1962 Ethiopia
Third place	1963 Ghana
- * Club domestic league appearances and goals

Taha Mahmood Ismail Badran (Arabic: طٰهٰ مَحْمُود إِسْمَاعِيل بَدْرَان; born 8 February 1939) is an Egyptian former footballer who played as a forward for Al-Ahly and the Egypt national team. He represented his country in the 1964 Summer Olympics.

After retiring, Ismail transitioned to managing the Saudi Arabia national team from 1972 to 1974, and had two short spells managing the Egypt national team.

== Honours ==
United Arab Republic

- African Cup of Nations: 1959; runner-up, 1962; 3rd place, 1963
