= 1956–57 Egyptian Premier League =

Egyptian Premier League
- Season: 1956–57
- Dates: 31 August 1956 – 9 June 1957
- Champions: Al Ahly (7th title)
- Relegated: Relegation was cancelled
- Matches played: 185
- Goals scored: 534 (2.89 per match)
- Top goalscorer: Hamdi Abdel Fattah (22 goals)
- Biggest home win: Al Ahly 6–0 El Sekka El Hadid (16 September 1956)
- Biggest away win: El Mansoura 0–6 Tanta (19 October 1956)
- Highest scoring: Ismaily 5–4 Tersana (5 October 1956)
- All statistics correct as of 2 January 2021.

The 1956–57 Egyptian Premier League, was the seventh season of the Egyptian Premier League, the top Egyptian professional league for association football clubs, since its establishment in 1948. The season started on 31 August 1956 and concluded on 9 June 1957. Defending champions Al Ahly won their 7th consecutive and 7th overall Egyptian Premier League title in the club history.

== League table ==
Pos	Club	Pld	W	D	L	F	A	Pts
1	Al Ahly (C)	26	18	4	4	55	21	40
2	Zamalek	26	13	5	8	51	36	31
3	Ismaily	26	11	8	7	45	38	30
4	Olympic	26	11	6	9	47	43	28
5	Al Masry	26	11	6	9	30	30	28
6	Tanta	26	9	7	10	39	30	25
7	Tersana	26	9	7	10	36	39	25
8	El Qanah	26	8	8	10	26	29	24
9	Teram	26	7	9	10	32	31	23
10	El Sekka El Hadid	26	9	5	12	32	41	23
11	Al Ittihad	26	8	7	11	40	54	23
12	Ghazl El Mahalla	26	7	8	11	26	39	22
13	Suez	26	7	7	12	28	38	21
14	El Mansoura	26	7	7	12	37	55	21

(C)= Champions, (R)= Relegated, Pld = Matches played; W = Matches won; D = Matches drawn; L = Matches lost; F = Goals for; A = Goals against; ± = Goal difference; Pts = Points.
