= El-Sayed El-Dhizui =

Egyptian footballer (1926–1991)

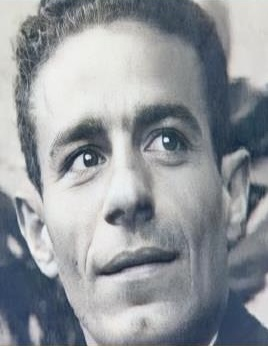
- El-Dhizui in 1961

Personal information
- Full name: El-Sayed Mohammed Al-Tabei
- Date of birth: 14 September 1926
- Place of birth: Port Said, Egypt
- Date of death: 24 December 1991 (aged 65)

Senior career*
Years	Team	Apps	(Gls)
1943–1956	Al Masry		
1956–1961	Al Ahly		
1961–1964	Al Masry		

International career
1948–1960	Egypt	50	(41)
Medal record
Men's football
Representing Egypt (as player)
Mediterranean Games
Gold medal – first place	1955
- * Club domestic league appearances and goals

El-Sayed Mohammed Al-Tabei "El-Dhizui" (Arabic: السيد محمد التابعي الضظوي; 14 September 1926 – 24 December 1991) was an Egyptian footballer. He was born in Port Said. He competed for Egypt at the 1948 Summer Olympics and the 1952 Summer Olympics. He is the fourth all-time top scorer of the Egypt national football team.

Al-Tabei was given the nickname El-Dhizui for his likeness to a local-based Italian player called Desi Lucetti. He was first known in his home city of Port Said as Desi Al-Saghir or Desi Junior, which later changed to Deswi or El-Dhizui.

== Club career ==
El-Dhizui began his playing career at an early age with his school at the Nile Primary School and later at Port Said Secondary, where he was spotted playing in a school league by Hussein Al-Deeb, coach of the Al-Masry Club, who was astounded by the youngster's ability on the ball. The coach alerted the club's president Abdel-Rahman Lotfi Pasha and, at the age of 16, the player was signed up for the team.

He quickly became a regular in the first team helping the club to win six titles in the Canal Zone League in 1943, 1944, 1945, 1946, 1947, and 1948, also reaching three Egyptian Cup finals. He was eventually called into the national team for the first time in a friendly game with Hungary in 1947. El-Dhizui ended up on the losing side with a 3–2 defeat but did manage to score on his debut. One year later he played at the 1948 Olympic Games in London. He scored five goals in three games to help Egypt win the 1st Pan Arab Games in Alexandria in 1953. When he played against the Netherlands, he impressed Queen Juliana of the Netherlands so much that after the game she half-jokingly asked for El-Dhizui's boots to be checked for magnets, as it seemed to her that the ball was glued to his feet for most of the game. The remark earned him another nickname, "El-Magnatis" or the Magnet. With his home club Al-Masry, he was leading scorer in the Egyptian league three times in consecutive years in 1949, 1950 and 1951, and after his move to Al Ahly in Cairo his 14 goals gave him his fourth title in 1959 and ended his career with Al-Ahly with 49 goals in five seasons for the club. In one game against Norway in Oslo in 1955, El-Dhizui scored all five goals for Egypt in their 5–4 win over the Scandinavians and was offered contracts from various European based clubs. He did not pursue these, however, and eventually joined Al-Ahly, winning four league titles and two cups in his five seasons at the club. He rejoined his first club Al-Masry in 1961, and retired in 1964 at the age of 37 with a record 112 goals in the Egyptian league.

== International career ==
He competed for Egypt at the 1948 Summer Olympics and the 1952 Summer Olympics, scoring 4 goals in the later, including a 14-minute hat-trick in a 5–4 win over Chile in the preliminary round on 16 July.

== Honours and achievements ==
=== Club ===
Al Masry

- Canal Zone League: (6) 1943, 1944, 1945, 1946, 1947, 1948

Al Ahly

- Egyptian League: (4) 1956–57, 1957–58, 1958–1959, 1960–61
- Egypt Cup: (2) 1957–58, 1960–61

Egypt

- Mediterranean Games: (1) 1955

=== Individual ===
- Egyptian League top goalscorer: 1948–49, 1949–50, 1950–51, 1958–59
