= Ossama Khalil =

Egyptian footballer (born 1954)

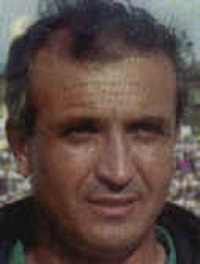

Personal information
- Full name: Ossama Mohammed Ahmed Khalil
- Date of birth: 5 February 1954 (age 72)
- Place of birth: Port Said, Egypt
- Height: 5 ft 11 in (1.80 m)
- Position: Striker

Senior career*
Years	Team	Apps	(Gls)
1972–1980	Ismaily		
1980	Philadelphia Fury	20	(1)
1981	Montreal Manic	0	(0)
1981	California Surf	15	(12)
1981–1982	Al Masry		
Total		35+	(13+)

International career
- Egypt
- * Club domestic league appearances and goals

Ossama Mohammed Ahmed Khalil (Arabic: أسامة خليل; born 5 February 1954) is an Egyptian retired footballer who played at both professional and international levels as a striker.

== Career ==
Born in Port Said, Khalil played club football for Ismaily, before moving to the United States, where he played in the North American Soccer League for the Philadelphia Fury, the Montreal Manic, and the California Surf. He returned to Egypt to play for Al Masry.

Khalil also played at international level for Egypt between 1973 and 1979.
