= El Qanah FC =

Egyptian football club

- Full name: El Qanah Football Club
- Short name: QAN
- Founded: 1946; 80 years ago
- Ground: Suez Canal Stadium
- Capacity: 22,000
- League: Egyptian Premier League
- 2025–26: Egyptian Second Division A, 1st of 18 (champions)
Home colours	Away colours

El Qanah Football Club (Arabic: نادى القناة الرياضي), also known as Canal SC or Suez Canal, is a football club based in Ismailia, Egypt. They compete in the Egyptian Premier League, following promotion in 2025–26.

== History ==
The club was founded in 1935 when a group of Ismailia-born contractors formed a football team, calling it "Badran Club". In 1948 the club members convinced the board of the Suez Canal company to merge the Badran club with the company to form "El Qanah", with the Frenchman Paul Blan as president, to take part in the league. The club was promoted to the Egyptian Premier League for the 1953–54 season, and played for 27 seasons in the top flight.

The club achieved the 2025–26 Egyptian Second Division A, securing promotion to the Egyptian Premier League.

== Players ==
=== Current squad ===
As of 22 September 2026

Note: Flags indicate national team as defined under FIFA eligibility rules; some limited exceptions apply. Players may hold more than one non-FIFA nationality.

No.	Pos.	Nation	Player
1	GK	EGY	Mostafa Mahmoud
2	DF	EGY	Momen Mahdy
3	DF	EGY	Ali Elfil
4	DF	EGY	Mahmoud Rizk
5	DF	EGY	Ibrahim Samy
6	MF	EGY	Momen Rady
7	MF	EGY	Hossam Greisha
8	MF	EGY	Mahmoud Hersha
9	FW	EGY	Hazem Abosena
10	FW	EGY	Mody Shalata
11	FW	EGY	Mohamed Hamdi
13	DF	EGY	Mohamed Hany Treka
14	MF	EGY	Mohamed El Kout
15	DF	EGY	Mohab Samy
16	GK	EGY	Mohamed Shaaban
17	FW	GHA	Rudolf Mensah

No.	Pos.	Nation	Player
18	FW	GHA	Mawuli Wayo
19	DF	EGY	Mohamed El Shebini
20	MF	GHA	Hafiz Ibrahim
21	DF	EGY	Islam Halima
22	MF	EGY	Mohamed Antar
24	MF	EGY	Mohamed Diab
25	MF	EGY	Mostafa Hamada
27	MF	EGY	Ahmed Ali (on loan from Al Masry)
30	DF	EGY	Osama El Nagar
33	MF	EGY	Mohamed Sadek (on loan from Cleopatra)
40	FW	EGY	Ibrahim El Sayed
66	MF	EGY	Mohamed Helal
77	GK	EGY	Ahmed Castelo
98	DF	EGY	Hassan El Shazly
—	FW	LBN	Ramy Najjarine

=== Former players ===
- Ally Badru – played for Zanzibar national team
- Mohammed Saleh – played for Palestine national team

== Basketball team ==
Suez Canal SC also has a men's basketball team that has played in the Egyptian Basketball Premier League.

== Honours ==
- Egypt Cup
  - Winners (1): 1963–64
- Egyptian Second Division A
  - Winners (1): 2025–26
