= History of Al Ahly SC =

Al Ahly Football Club (Arabic: النادي الاهلي لكرة القدم, lit.: 'The National Club'), commonly referred to as Al Ahly, is an Egyptian professional football club based in Cairo, and is considered as the most successful team in Africa and as one of the continent's giants.

The club has a record of 44 national league titles, 39 national cup titles, and 15 national super cup titles, making them the most decorated club in Egypt. In addition, Al Ahly has never been relegated to the Egyptian Second Division.

In international competitions, Al Ahly has won a record of 12 CAF Champions League titles, a CAF Confederation Cup, a record of 8 CAF Super Cups, a record of 4 African Cup Winners' Cups, an Afro-Asian Club Championship, an Arab Club Champions Cup, an Arab Cup Winners' Cup, a record of 2 Arab Super Cups, and has won 4 bronze medals in the FIFA Club World Cup. With 26 African titles, Al Ahly is the most successful football club in African history, and was voted by CAF as African club of the 20th century Al Ahly is the most successful club in the world in terms of number of trophies won and second in terms of international titles won with 26.

== Establishment and start of the club ==
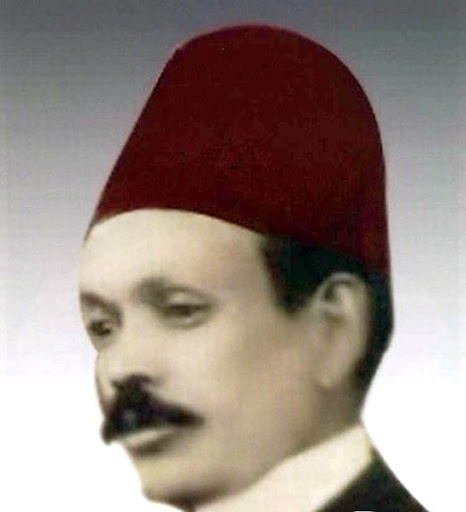
Omar Lotfy, the founder of Al Ahly.

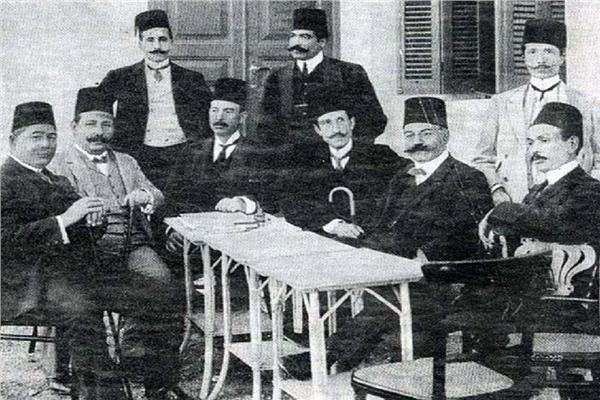
The first official meeting of the club's board.

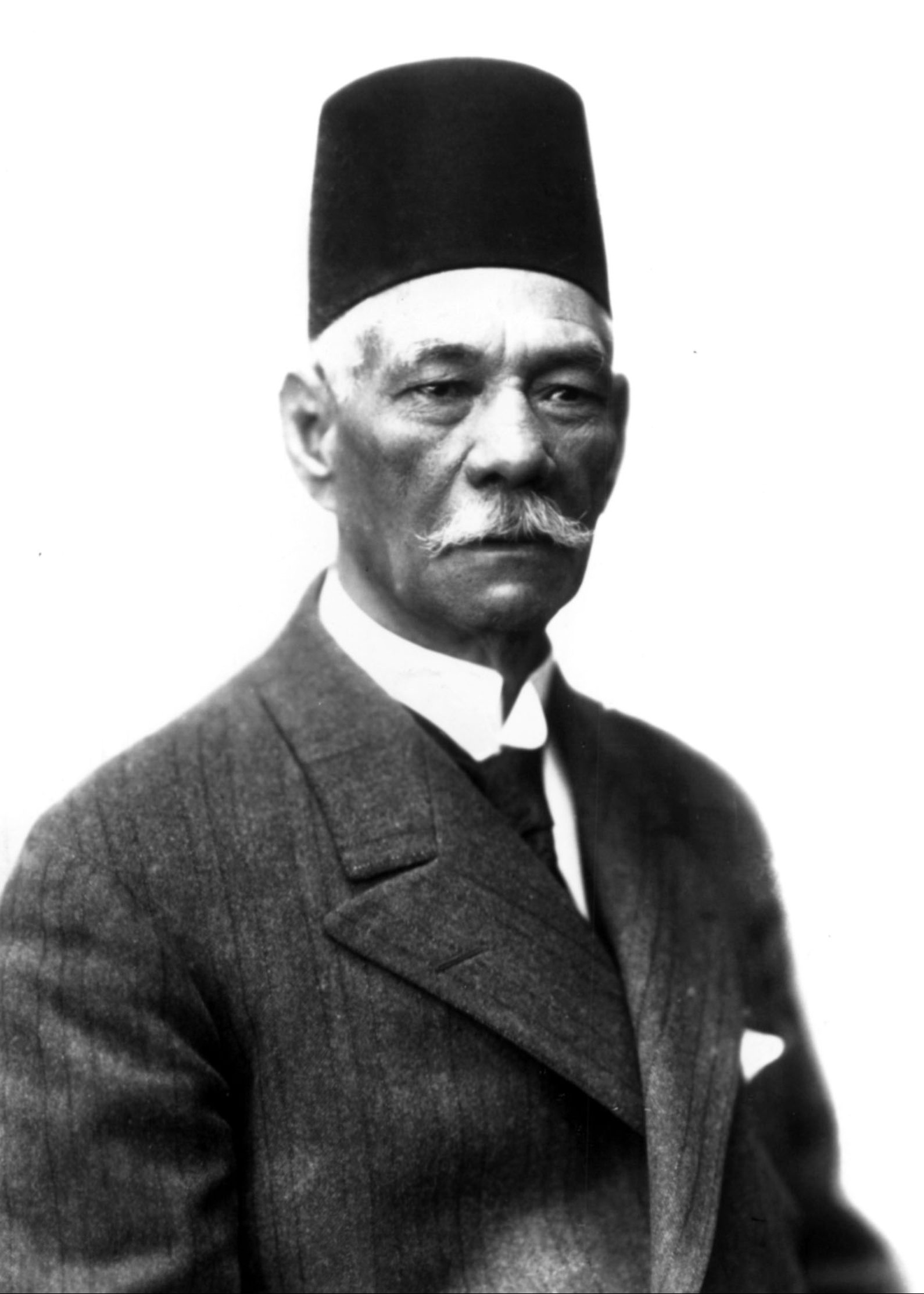
Saad Zaghloul, the Minister of Education, became the first honorary president of Al Ahly.

The idea of establishing Al Ahly in the first decade of the 20th century was raised by Omar Lotfy during his presidency of the High School Students Club which was established in 1905. The establishment of the club of high school students was for political reasons, and found that these students needed a sports club that gathers them for leisure and exercise. He discussed the idea of establishing the club with a group of friends who were enthusiastic about it, and in 1907 Al Ahly was established.

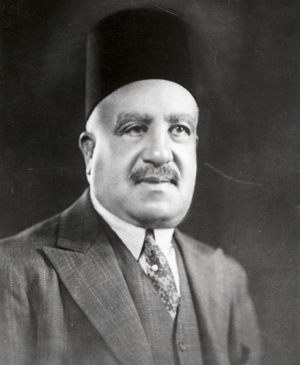
Talaat Harb, president of the Bank of Egypt, contributed 100 pounds to the establishment of the club.

The club was first headed by Alfred Mitchell-Innes, who was a British advisor to the Ministry of Finance at the time, in order to facilitate financial support for the club. An official meeting of the club's board was held on 24 April 1907. The committee met at 5:30 pm in the house of Mitchell-Innes in Giza under his chairmanship and the membership of Idris Ragheb Bey, Ismael Seri Pasha, Amin Sami Pasha, Omar Lotfi Bek and Mohamed Effendi Sherif as secretary.

The establishment of the club was approved and Ismail Seri, as an architect, designed the main building of the club which was revised by Mitchell-Innes to locate the building in the south eastern corner of the land so that the building main entrance would face north. A civil company on behalf of Al Ahly Sports Club was established and shares of the company were valued at 5 pounds per share. With this, Al Ahly intended to raise £E5000 pounds, but fell short of their target, collecting £E3165 pounds over the course of a year. The club then sought to borrow £E1,000 from the National Bank of Egypt in March 1908 whose president, Talaat Harb, personally contributed £E100 to aid the establishment of the club. The first honorary president of the club was the Minister of Education Saad Zaghloul. The name of the Al Ahly Sporting Club was suggested by Amine Samy Amin, to serve the students and graduates of high schools who were the mainstay of the revolution against the British occupation.

On 2 April 1908, Mitchell-Innes stepped down as president of the club. Aziz Ezzat was appointed as the new president and became the first Egyptian president of Al Ahly. The official opening ceremony of the club was held in the club's main building on 26 February 1908.

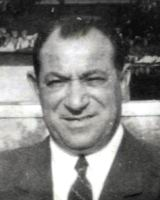
Mokhtar El Tetsh, one of the club legends, the club's old stadium and current training stadium was named after him

Although the game of football was not one of the goals of the founders of Al Ahly club the goal of the club was opening its doors to students of higher schools to meet and practice political dialogues, but the graduates of high schools members of the club have fallen in love with football, which prompted Ahly to build the first stadium in 1909 and they used to call it the time (Al-Hawsh), which is a colloquial word from Egyptian dialect means the courtyard in Arabic. The stadium was developed over the years to be Mokhtar El-Tetsh Stadium.

The first official football team was established in 1911. The team is one of the primary and secondary school players who played the ball in Al-Hawash, which was established in 1909 in the club's land. The names of the first players of Al Ahly club were as follows: Hussain Higazi, Abdel Fattah Taher, Fouad Darwish, Hussein Mansour, and Ibrahim Fahmy. The star of this team was the striker Hussein Hegazi.

In 1915, Al Ahly made tours inside Egypt cities in order to play various matches and to spread football and its culture. Al Ahly played in Alexandria, Port Said, Assiut, and Ismailia. The team, led by the star Hussein Hegazy, faced many teams, including foreign teams belonging to the British army, which increased the popularity of Al Ahly and the new game in Egypt. Ahly contributed with Zamalek SC, El Sekka El Hadid SC in the formation of the first football team of Egypt to participate in the Olympic games 1920. Al-Ahly contributed to the establishment of the Egyptian Football Association. In 1923, Al Ahly played an active role in the establishment of the Egyptian Tennis Federation.

=== First Titles (1918–1948) ===
After Al Ahly refused to compete with foreign Allied clubs in the Sultan Hussein Cup in its first edition in 1917, the club's management decided to participate in the 1918 championship. In 1923, Al-Ahly won the Sultan Hussain Cup after beating the defending champion Zamalek, then added 6 other titles to be the record holder in the number of wins until the last edition in 1938.

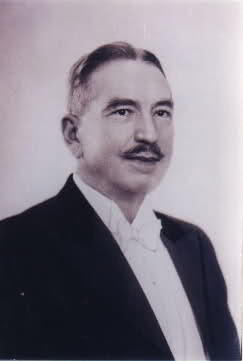
Gaafar Waly, The first president of both the Egyptian Football Association and Al Ahly sports club at the same time

After one year of winning the Sultan Hussain Cup, Al Ahly won the King Farouk Cup in 1924 for the first time after defeating El Sekka El Hadid 4–1. The man of the match was Mokhtar Eltetsh, who scored two goals.

In the summer of 1929, the Al Ahly football team made a tour, the first of its kind where the team traveled to face several European clubs, such as Fenerbahçe and Galatasaray in Turkey and BFC Preussen, 1860 Munich and Schalke in Germany. The tour ended after Al Ahly played the last two games in Bulgaria against Levski Sofia and Slavia Sofia.

In November 1930, Al-Ahly defeated traditional rival Zamalek 4–0 in a match in the Cairo League. In that game, Mokhtar El Tetsh was the first player to score a hat trick in the Cairo Derby.

At the end of the 1936–1937 season, Al Ahly won the double by winning the Cairo League tournaments and then the Egypt Cup, beating Zamalek and El Sekka El Hadid. Al Ahly managed to win the league in the last round, defeating Zamalek 4–1 and winning the league 3 points ahead of its traditional rival. In the cup final, Al Ahly defeated Al Sikka 3–2 in an exciting match. Al Ahly's winning goal was scored by Abdel Karim Saqr in the last minutes.

1938 was the last year in which the Sultan Hussein Cup was held, which started in 1917, and Al Ahly won its last version with a difficult 1–0 victory over Al Masry in the final match after Mustafa Latif scored a goal in the first half of extra time. In the Cairo League competition, Al Ahly won it in the last round again, with a large 5–1 victory over the second placed team Zamalek, in a match in which Saleh Al Sawwaf scored two goals, and Mokhtar El-Tetsh, Jamil Saber and Abdel-Majid El-Ashry scored one goal.

Al Ahly football team traveled to Palestine in 1943 on a 23-day tour headed by the legend Mokhtar El Tetsh to play several matches with Arab teams to support Palestine against the Zionists. The decision came, despite the refusal of the president of the Egyptian Football Association Haider Pasha due to the pressure from the British, due to their known position against the Palestinian issue.

=== Dominating the league (1948–1967) ===
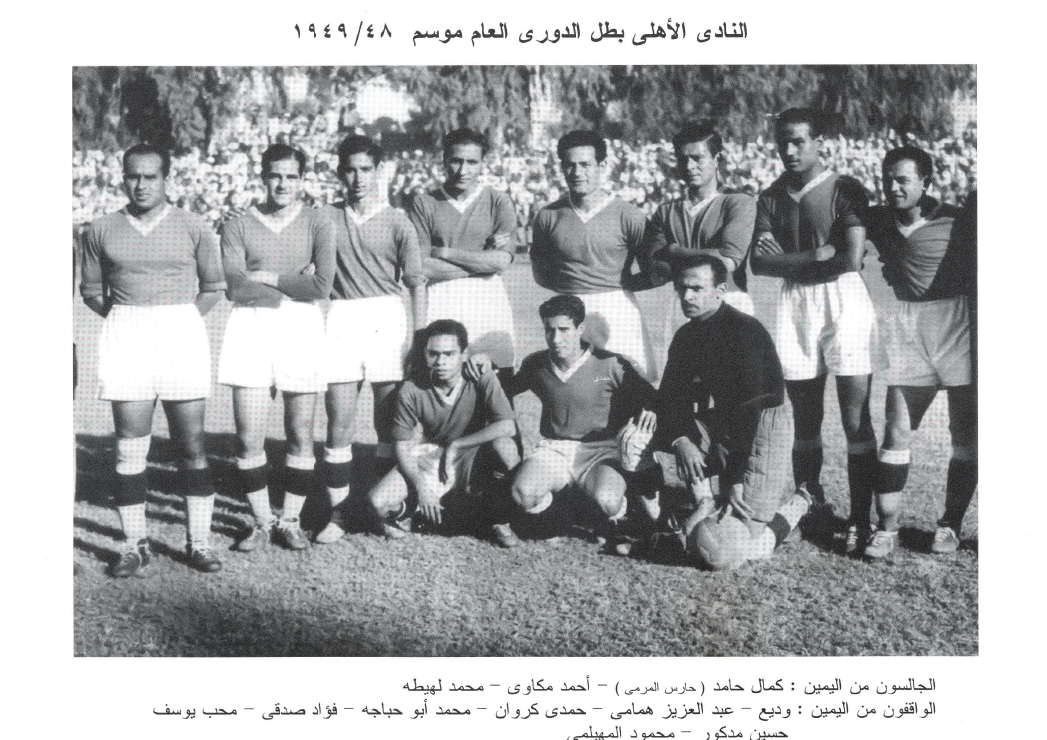
Al Ahly squad in First Egyptian League.

In the first edition of the Egyptian Premier League that was held for the first time in 1948, Al Ahly won the first match 5–0 against Greek Alexandria. Ahmed Makkawi scored the first goal for Al Ahly in the history of the competition in the 11th minute. Mekkawi added a second goal in the second half, and Helmy Abu El-Maaty, Mohamed Lahita and Fathi Khattab each scored one goal. The first team to represent Al Ahly in the competition was composed of: Kamal Hamed – Abdulaziz Hamami – Muhammad Abu Habajah – Abdel Moneim Shatara – Sayed Othman – Hilmi Abu Al-Moaty – Fouad Sidqi – Muhammad Lheta – Ahmed Mekkawi – Saleh Selim – Fathi Khattab. Mokhatr al Tetsh led Al Ahly to win the first championship in the club's history as a player and also led Al Ahly to win the first league in the club's history as a manager, Al Ahly snapped the league and cup (the double) for the first time after defeating Zamalek 3–1 in the 1949 Egypt Cup final. Toto, Hussein Madkour and Fathi Khattab scored for Al Ahly.

The 1949–50 season witnessed a historical superiority for Al Ahly by the golden fifties generation led by Saleh Selim and Toto and Ahmed Makkawi, winning all the local championships. Al Ahly won the Egyptian Premier League after strong competition with Tersana ended with the two teams tying in points. The league winner was decided by a play-off match; Al Ahly clinched the league the after defeating Tersana 2–1 in the play-off. Goals were scored by Toto and Fathi Khattab. Al Ahly also won the Cairo League, one point ahead of Tersana. In the Egypt Cup, Al Ahly Defeated Tersana in the final by a big score 6–0.

In the 1950–51 season, Al Ahly won the double, by winning the league for the third consecutive time despite the strong competition with Zamalek, Then the Red Giants completed the double with a difficult victory in the Egyptian Cup final against El Sekka El Hadid.

Following the dethroning of King Farouk in the revolution of 1952, Ahly appointed Gamal Abdel Nasser as club honorary president.

The 1951–52 league championship was canceled due to the revolution of 1952. The competition returned the following season and Al Ahly managed to win it for the fourth time in a row with only two points ahead of Zamalek, after the two teams tied 2–2 in the last round, In the Egypt Cup, Al Ahly managed to defeat the defending champions Zamalek 4–1 in the final in a match in which Saleh Selim scored two goals and his older brother Abdel-Wahab Selim also scored a goal.

In the 1956–57 season, the number of teams increased to 14 teams, and Al-Ahly managed to win the league with a difference of 9 points ahead from Zamalek the runner-up, to win the seventh title in a row. It was the first time that the team had reached 40 points.

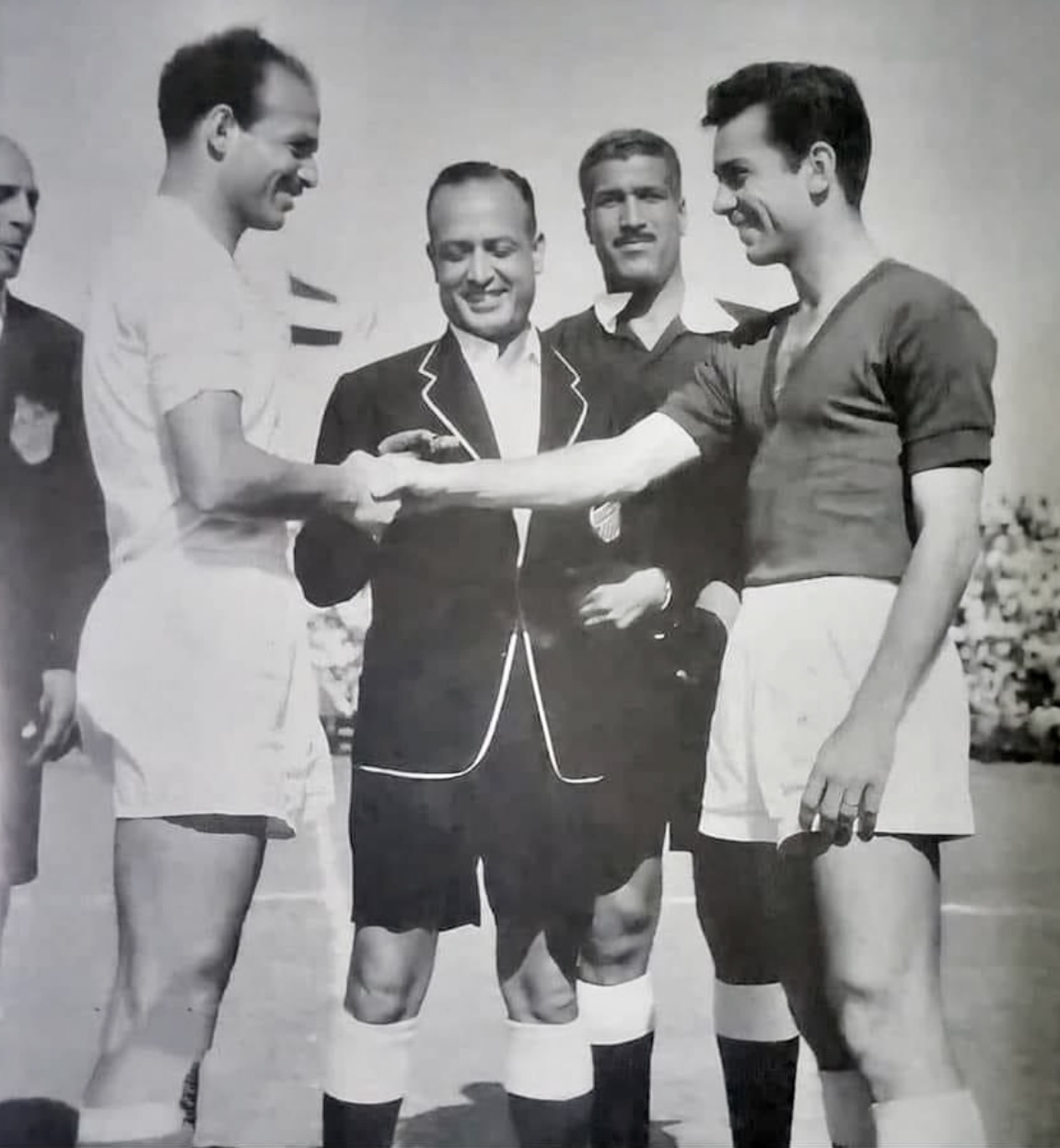
Al Ahly's captain Saleh Selim shaking hands with Zamalek's captain Nour El-Dali and referee preparing to make a coin toss before playing the 1959 Egypt Cup final

Al Ahly won the 1958–59 league championship for the ninth time in a row. El-Sayed El-Dhizui became the first Al Ahly player to be the top goal scorer in the league. Al Ahly scored 55 goals in just 18 games this season, more than 20 goals from its nearest competitors.

After losing the league for the first time since the start of the competition, Al Ahly won the league for the tenth time in the club history in 1960–61 season. Al Ahly won the Egypt Cup after defeating El Qanah 5–0. Mimi El-Sherbini scored two goals for Al Ahly.

=== First participation in African championships (1967–1980) ===
After the 1967 war and the suspension of sporting activity in Egypt, the Club Board headed by Ibrahim Kamel El-Wakil announced that the club will host the military training for the members that will volunteer in the army, as well as collect donations in the name of the club to support the army.

An entire generation of football stars retired because of the war, like Saleh Selim, Tariq Salim, Taha Ismail, Rifaat El-Fanagily, Adel Haikal and Mahmoud El-Gohary. Al-Ahly did not win the league for another 13 years.

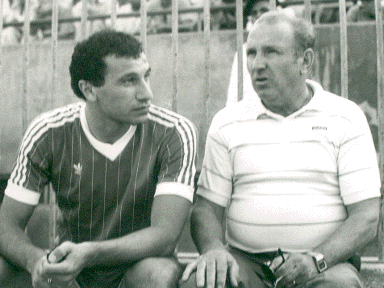
Nándor Hidegkuti and Mahmoud El Khatib

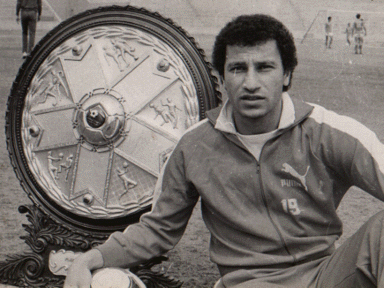
El Khatib with the 1976–77 League championship.

After years of deterioration, Ahly took the first steps to recovery when the management decided to sign Nándor Hidegkuti as head coach in September 1973 at a salary of fewer than 600 dollars. Hidegkuti brought up a new generation known as El Talamza (the students). The league title returned to Al Ahly in 1974–75, with the team scoring 70 goals in 34 games.

Al Ahly's first participation in the African Champions League was in 1976, and the start was unsuccessful for the future Club of the Century, as the team got knocked out from the first round by MC Alger. Al Khatib scored the first continental goal for Al Ahly.

Ahly won the league championship in 1975–76 and 1976–77. This season saw the second participation in African competition, where the team fared better than the first time. They eventually bowed out in the quarter-finals by Hearts of Oak. From 1978 to 1980, Hidegkuti refused to take part in the African Cup of Champions Clubs due to lack of financial resources and exhausting journeys in Africa.

=== Invading Africa (1980–1990) ===
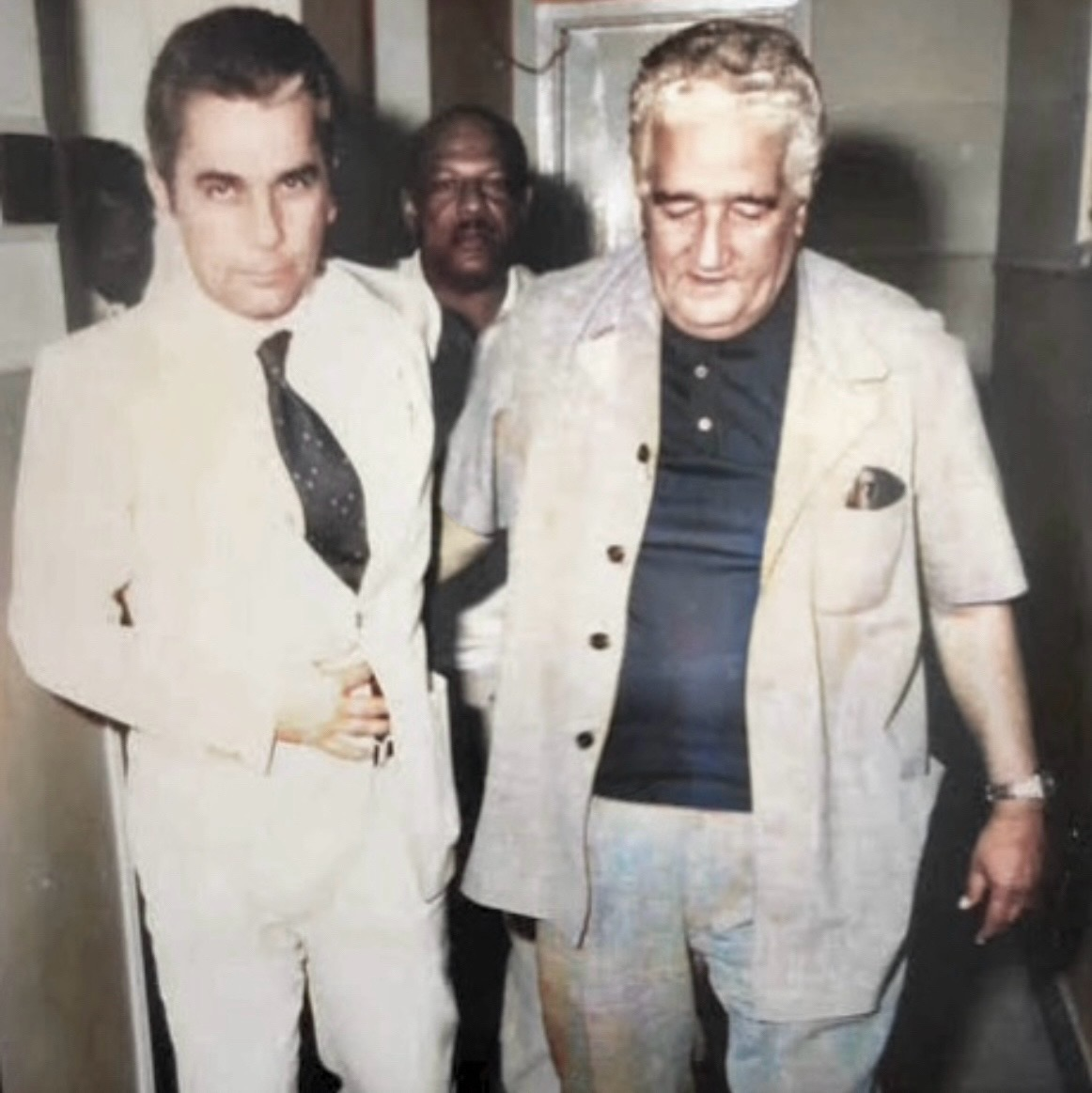
Al Ahly's president Saleh Selim (left) and Zamalek's president Mohamed Hassan Helmy meeting in Zamalek headquarters, 1980

Zamalek remained ahead of Al Ahly by six points in the 1981–82 Egyptian Premier League season. In this season the winner of the game received two points and not three. Last matches in the competition witnessed bad performance by Zamalek until Al Ahly managed to win the championship after a goalless draw against Zamalek in the last round. Al Ahly won the championship in the end by three points ahead of Zamalek. Al Ahly reached the semi-final of 1981 African Cup of Champions Clubs but withdrew because of the assassination of the President Anwar Sadat.

Al Ahly won the 1982 African Cup of Champions Clubs (which was later renamed to CAF Champions League), defeating Asante Kotoko S.C. in the final. They won the first leg 3–0. Mahmoud El Khatib scored two goals and Alaa Mayhoub scored one goal. The first leg was held on Sunday (28 November) at the Cairo Stadium in front of 60,000 spectators. In the second leg match in Kumasi, Mahmoud El Khatib returned to score again and the game ended 1–1. The second leg was held on Wednesday (12 December) in Kumasi, Ghana, and was attended by more than 70,000 spectators. Al Ahly during this edition of the tournament played ten games, achieved victory in five games at home, lost two games and tied in three away. The biggest result was a 5–0 victory against Young Africans in the round of 16. Al Ahly scored 16 goals and conceded 5 goals only in this tournament. After 15 years, Al-Ahly finally won their first continental championship.

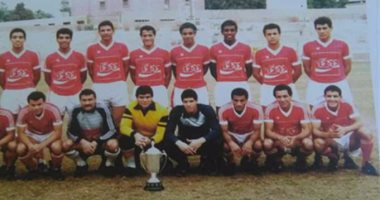
Al Ahly Players with the 1982 CAF Champions League.

Al Ahly reached the final of the African Champions League for the second time in a row in 1983, but rivals Kotoko managed to avenge their defeat by scoring the only goal in both matches. The first leg was played on Sunday (27 November) at Cairo Stadium in the presence of 90,000 spectators, attended by the former President Hosni Mubarak, and ended 0–0. The second leg, which took place on Sunday (11 December) in Kumasi in the presence of 70,000 spectators, ended with 1–0 win scored by Opoku Nti in the 22nd minute. The goal of the match was from a clear offside.

Al Ahly reached a continental final again in 1984 this time in the African Cup Winners' Cup against Canon Yaoundé. Al-Ahly won on penalties in the Cameroonian capital after a 1–1 draw in both games. The 1984–85 season was one of the best seasons in the history of Al Ahly, as the Red Giants won the cup and the league and won the African Cup Winners Cup for the second time in a row by defeating Leventis United 2–1 on aggregate. For the third time in a row, Al Ahly won the African Cup Winners' Cup in 1986 after winning the league, by defeating AS Sogara in the final 3–2 on aggregate, with Taher Abouzeid scoring two goals and Magdi Abdel Ghani scoring once.

Al Ahly won the Egyptian League in the 1986–87 season under the management of the coach Taha Ismail. The competition with Zamalek continued until the last round, when Al Ahly was two points ahead. Al Ahly was able to beat Zamalek in the last round 2–1 with two goals scored by Ayman Shawky.

Al Ahly won the 1987 African Cup of Champions Clubs by defeating Al-Hilal Club in the final. The first leg was a 0–0 draw played on Sunday (29 November) in the Sudanese capital Khartoum attended by 50,000 Sudanese and 500 Egyptian spectators. The second leg in Cairo ended 2–0 for Al Ahly, Jamal Thaalab scored an own goal and Ayman Shawky scored the second goal. The match was held on Friday 18 December at Cairo Stadium in the presence of 80,000 spectators. Three days after the match, Al Ahly legend Mahmoud El Khatib decided to retire after 17 years at a press conference attended by a large crowd of journalists.

=== Arab Tournaments Glory & Boycotting CAF (1990–2005) ===
Al Ahly won the Egypt Cup title in 1992 by defeating the league champion Zamalek 2–1 in an exciting final. The hero was Ayman Shawky, who scored the winning goal in the 92nd minute after he scored a spectacular header.

After winning the Egypt Cup for the third time in a row in 1993, Al Ahly returned to Africa by winning the African Cup Winners' Cup for the fourth time in its history in 1993, which was the last participation of the club in this tournament, Al Ahly defeated Africa Sports d'Abidjan in the final with a penalty scored by Adel Abdelrahman in Cairo Stadium after a 1–1 draw in the first leg. In the same season, Al Ahly won the Egypt Cup by beating Ghazl El Mahalla SC 3–2 in the final.

After three years without winning the league, the title returned to Al Ahly in the 1993–94 season under the management of Alan Harris after a strong competition with Ismaily SC, which was only decided by a playoff match in which the Red Giants won 4–3 in Alexandria by a wonderful hat-trick scored by Mohamed Ramadan.

Al Ahly participated in the Arab Championships for the first time in 1994 after a decision to boycott the African tournaments due to weak financial returns and complaints on the referee decisions in the 1994 CAF Super Cup. Al Ahly won the 1994 Arab Cup Winners' Cup by defeating Al-Shabab FC (Riyadh) in the final 1–0 with a goal scored by Felix Aboagye. After leading Al Ahly to its second consecutive league title and the Arab Super Cup in Morocco, Reiner Hollmann left Al Ahly at the end of 1997, after finishing second in the 1997 Arab Club Champions Cup in Tunisia. He was replaced by his countryman Rainer Zobel, who succeeded in winning the league championship for the fifth consecutive season in 1997–98 and winning the 1998 Arab Super Cup title with Zobel for the second successive season after beating MC Oran, Al-Shabab, and drawing with Club Africain. In 1998, Al Ahly returned to the African championships for the first time in six years.

In the summer of 2001, Ahly signed Manuel José to take on the leadership of the team and this was the first time in the history of the club to have a manager from Portugal. Jose's first acquaintance with Al Ahly was the friendly match against Real Madrid in August 2001, when Al Ahly stunned Spanish giants Real Madrid with a 1–0 win with a goal by Sunday Chibuike at the Cairo Stadium. The goal came after Khaled Bebo embarked on a superb counter-attacking solo run before passing to Hossam Ghaly who beat the Real goalkeeper and passed it Sunday who shoot it into the empty net. This was the fourth time Al Ahly had defeated a European team with a newly crowned Champions League title, after defeating Benfica 3–2 in 1963 who had won the European Cup in 1961 and 1962 and reached the final in 1963, Bayern Munich in 1977 winning 2–1 and finally, Steaua București in 1986, winning 3–0.

Al-Ahly won the African Champions League title after a 4–1 victory over Mamelodi Sundowns F.C. The first leg was held on Saturday (8 December) at the Loftus Versfeld Stadium in the South African capital Pretoria and ended in a 1–1 draw. Gift Kampamba scored in the 26th minute, and Sayed Abdel Hafeez equalized in the 58th minute. The second leg was held on 21 December at Cairo International Stadium in the presence of 75,000 spectators, and ended with a victory for Al Ahly with three goals scored: Khaled Bebo in the 36th minute from a penalty, at the 45th minute from an assist by Mohamed Farouk, and at the 90th minute from an assist by Walid Salah.

Al Ahly also confirmed its continental supremacy by grabbing the Super Cup with a victory over yet another South African team. This time the victim was Kaizer Chiefs F.C., who lost 4–1 in Cairo in a match in which Al Ahly goalkeeper Essam El Hadary scored his historic goal. Jose was unable to collect any local championships in his first term, but he was able to achieve a very special achievement by beating Zamalek 6–1 in the league. The defending champions Zamalek had a very strong team, but Khaled Bebo, the star of Al Ahly, managed to score 4 goals. It is the first and only time in the history of the Cairo derby that any player had achieved this. At the end of the season Jose was sacked and replaced by the Dutchman Johannes Bonfrere on a one-year contract, on a monthly salary of $18,000, The club's decision to sack Jose was not welcomed by the majority of the fans.

=== The Golden Era (2005–2013) ===
Al Ahly achieved victory in all the matches of the first 14 rounds of the 2004–05 Egyptian Premier League, to win the Premier League title for the 29th time in the club history and the first local championship for the Portuguese coach Manuel José who was rehired again by the club. Al Ahly won the league by a record 31 point difference from Enppi, the closest competitor, a first in the history of the competition. It was the first time that a club won all their matches in the first half of a season since the league began in 1948.

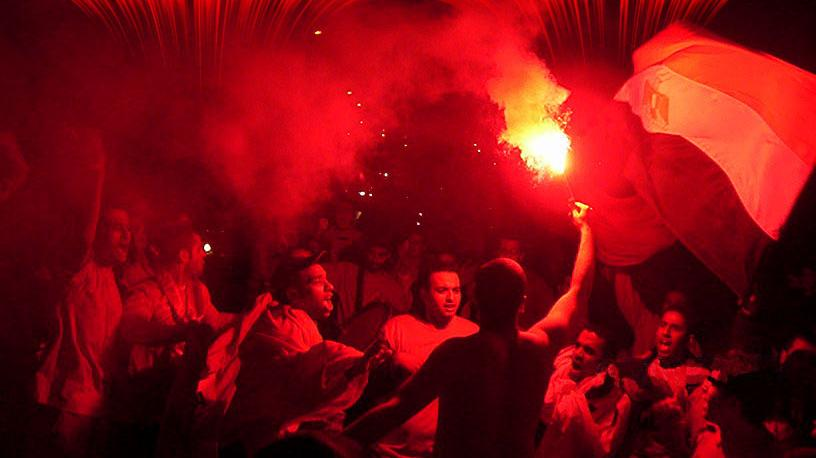
Al Ahly fans Celebrating after winning the 2005 CAF Champions League

Al Ahly also won the first Egyptian Super Cup with an exciting win over ENPPI Club 1–0, with a goal in extra time by Wael Gomaa. At the end of 2005, Ahly clinched the CAF Champions League for the fourth time in their history after defeating Étoile Sportive du Sahel 3–0 in Cairo. The first leg was played on Saturday (29 October) at the Stade Olympique de Sousse, Tunisia, and ended 0–0. The second leg was played on Saturday (12 November) at the Cairo Military Academy Stadium in the presence of 30,000 spectators, due to renovations at Cairo International Stadium in preparation for hosting the 2006 African Nations Cup. Al Ahly won 3–0, with goals scored by Mohamed Aboutrika in the 19th minute, Osama Hosni from a header in the 52nd minute, and Mohammed Barakat from a screamer. Al Ahly set a record of not losing in 52 games in 852 days. Ahly also won the Super Cup by beating ASFAR with penalties. Al Ahly then appeared at the FIFA Club World Cup in Japan for the first time, but the start was not successful as the team lost to Sydney FC and then Al-Ittihad.

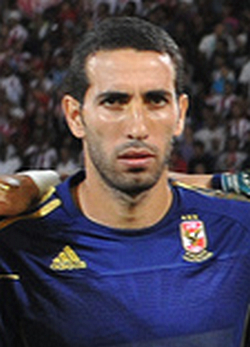
Mohamed Aboutrika, one of the club legends.

Many believe that 2006 is the best in the history of Al Ahly in terms of various achievements, starting with the Egyptian Super Cup for the second time with another exciting win over Enppi with a goal of in the stoppage time. Al Ahly also won the league title for the second time in a row. Al Ahly then returned to the Egyptian Cup with a big 3–0 win over Zamalek SC, scoring the full mark in local championships. They dominated Africa again by reaching the final against CS Sfaxien. The result of the first leg between Al Ahly and Sfaxien ended 1–1 in Cairo Stadium, with goals scored by Abu Trika in the first half from a direct free kick, and then an equalizer from Frimpong for Sfaxien after only five minutes of the second half. Every one predicted that the cup will go to CS Sfaxien for the first time in its history and that Ahly was only 90 minutes away from losing the title. In the last seconds of the second leg, the result was 0–0 until the historic moment where the left foot of Mohamed Aboutrika scoring a spectacular goal, setting a new history in the letters of gold in the records of Ahly. Al Ahly returned to participate in 2006 FIFA Club World Cup for the second time in a row in the championship that was held in Japan. Al Ahly's participation this time was much better than the first time, as Al Ahly defeated Auckland City FC in the quarter-final 2–0 with two goals scored by Flávio Amado and Mohamed Aboutrika in the second half. The team qualified for the semi-finals to face the Brazilian club Internacional. Al Ahly played a great match but lost 2–1. Alexandre Pato and Luiz Adriano scored for the Brazilian team and Flavio scored for Al Ahly in the second half. Al Ahly played a match to determine the third and fourth places. Al Ahly managed to defeat Club América in Yokohama 2–1 for the bronze medal. Mohamed Aboutrika scored the two goals for Al Ahly, while Salvador Cabañas scored the only goal for the Mexican club. Al Ahly won the bronze medal for the first time in African history.

Al Ahly played the 2007 CAF Super Cup on 18 February at the Addis Ababa Stadium. As the champion of the 2006 CAF Champions League against the ES Sahel, the champion of the 2006 CAF Confederation Cup, Al Ahly suffered from many absences at this time because of injuries. However, the match reached to penalties after extra time ended with a goalless draw, and Al Ahly won the penalty shootout 5–4. After achieving the Super Cup title, Al Ahly was able to equal the record set by Zamalek with 3 Super Cup titles, before achieving three other titles more than any other club. Al Ahly also set another record as the club that participated most in the African Super Cups (8 times).

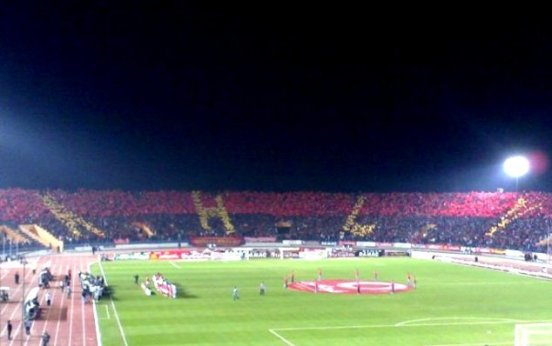
Ultras Ahlawy Tifo before Cairo derby in 2007–08 Egyptian Premier League.

The red control continued on the league's shield. Al Ahly won the Egyptian Premier League for the 4th consecutive time by 17 points away from Ismaily SC. The team also won the Super Cup for the fourth time in a row by beating Zamalek 2–0 with goals by Ahmed Hassan and Moataz Eno. It was the second victory in a week for Ahly over Zamalek after they met in the CAF Champions League a week earlier. Al Ahly won the CAF Champions league for the sixth time with a 4–2 win on aggregate over Coton Sport FC de Garoua in the final after finishing the first leg with a 2–0 win and drawing in the second leg 2–2. Ahly set off for the Club World Cup again, but this time the results were not good, with two defeats from C.F. Pachuca and Adelaide Football Club.

Al Ahly started the 2008–09 season with the title of the CAF Super Cup after defeating CS Sfaxien 2–1. Al Ahly had two goals scored by Flávio Amado before the start of an exciting race on the league's shield with Ismaily. The two teams played a playoff match to determine the champion. Al Ahly won the match 1–0 by Flavio's goal that came after just five minutes with a header from a free kick delivered by his compatriot Gilberto. It was the last championship for Manuel José during his second term before leaving the team's leadership to Hossam El-Badry. Hossam Al Badry managed to keep the 2009–10 league shield in Al Ahly's cupboard to become the first national coach to win the league championship in 23 years. Al Ahly won the Egyptian Super Cup by defeating Haras El Hodoud SC 1–0.

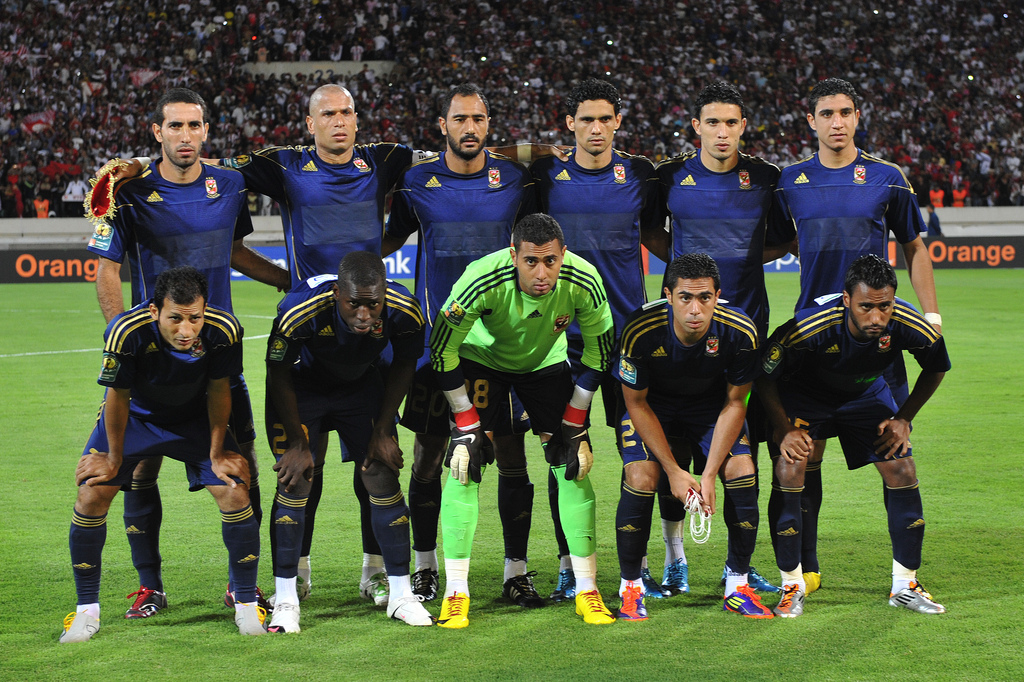
Al Ahly starting line up in 2011.

In the CAF Champions League, Al Ahly qualified for the semi-finals but was knocked out by Espérance Sportive de Tunis because of a famous referee Joseph Lamptey mistake that gave the hosts a win in the second leg with a clear handball in the goal scored by Michael Eneramo.

The sports activity in Egypt was postponed because of the Port Said Stadium riot. In the first match after the return of sports activity, Ahly won the Egyptian Super Cup after defeating Enppi 2–1 in a sad match at the empty stadium of Borg El Arab Stadium. Despite the difficult events, Al Ahly players overcame all circumstances and achieved the 2012 CAF Champions League for the seventh time after they beat Esperance in the Final. After finishing the first leg 1–1 at the Borg El Arab Stadium, Al Ahly was able to defeat Esperance in the second leg at the Stade Olympique de Radès 2–1. Gedo scored Al Ahly's opener from a shot inside the 18 yard box before half-time, and Walid Soliman scored to make the score 2–0 in the 61st minute. Esperance's striker Yannick N'Djeng pulled a goal back to give Esperance fans hope again. Mohamed Aboutrika missed a penalty, but Al Ahly held on to become African champions for a seventh time.

Al Ahly, led by Hossam Al Badri, achieved fourth place in the 2012 FIFA Club World Cup in Japan, achieving victory in the first match against Sanfrecce Hiroshima 2–1, with goals by El Sayed Hamdy and Ahly's talismanic striker Mohamed Aboutrika who came off the bench to score the winning goal after only 12 minutes into the second half. Then, Al Ahly lost 1–0 to the Copa Libertadores champion Corinthians, and then Al Ahly was defeated by Monterrey in the third-place match.

Hossam Al Badri left the team to Mohamed Youssef, who managed to complete the march successfully and lead Ahly to achieve the 2013 CAF Champions League for the eighth time by beating the South African club Orlando Pirates 2–0 in the second leg match after a 1–1 draw in the first leg. Mohamed Aboutrika scored for Al Ahly in the first leg from a freekick from outside the penalty area on the 14th minute. The second leg match was the last impression of the fans of the legend Mohamed Aboutrika when he scored the first goal of the match to be the last goal of his eternal journey in the red shirt.

=== Mahmoud Taher Era (2014–2017) ===
Al Ahly made their way to the African Confederations Cup after an early exit from the Champions League, but the Red Giants had a strong new impetus, which was the addition of this continental tournament to the club's cupboard for the first time. Indeed, Al Ahly reached the final against Séwé FC but lost the first leg 2–1. In the return match, the score stayed 0–0 until the sixth minute of stoppage time. At a historic moment, Ahly's determination to win, Emad Moteab grabbed the goal of the coronation with a deadly header that made every fan celebrating in Cairo Stadium and made coach Juan Carlos Garrido run in Hysteria on the pitch. Garrido was sacked after the club was eliminated from CAF Champions League on penalties to Moghreb Tétouan.

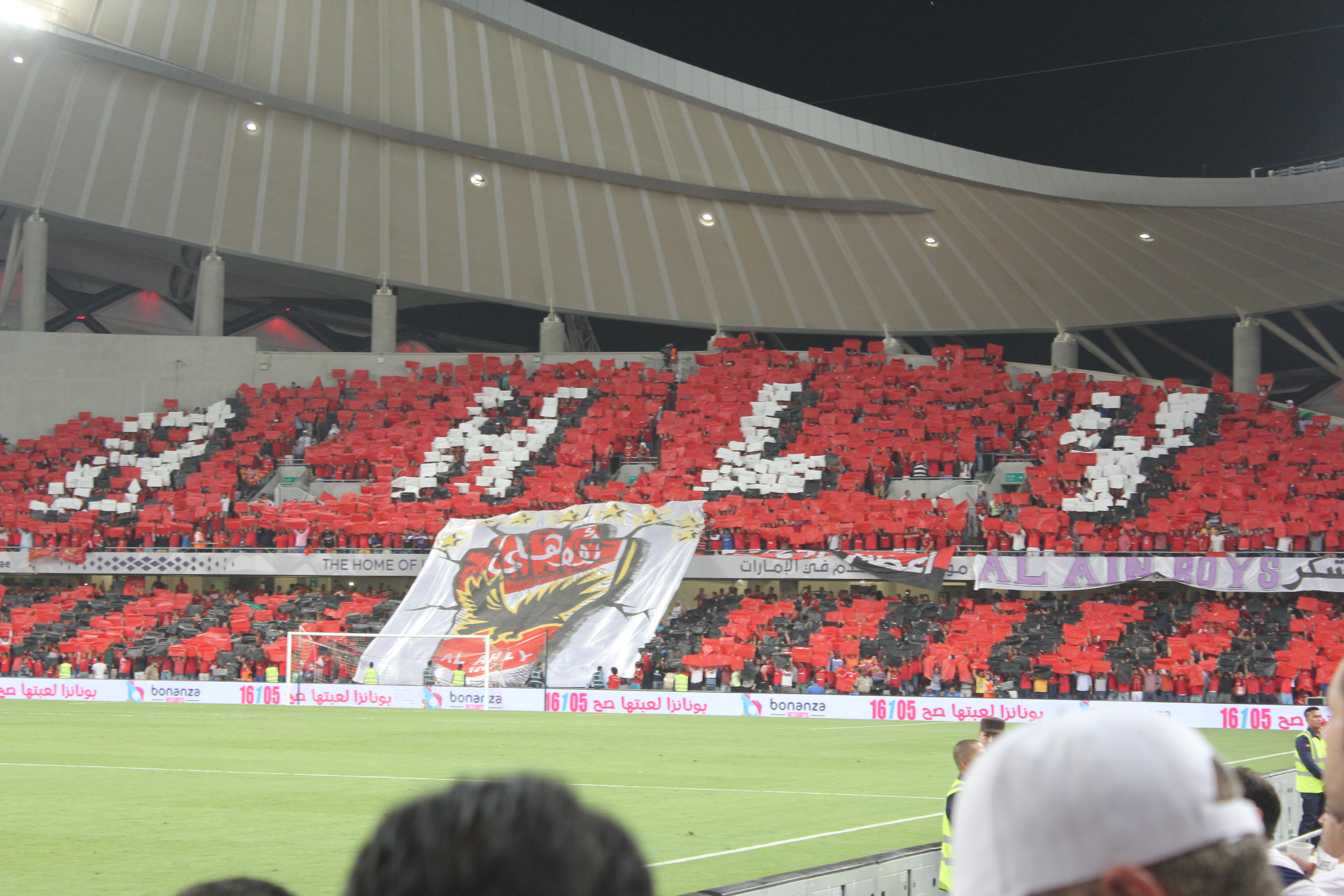
Al Ahly fans Tifo before the Egyptian Super Cup in 2015.

Al Ahly went through a critical phase after most of the stars of the old generation retired, causing the loss of a number of tournaments until the team regained its balance when they met with Zamalek to determine the Super Cup champion in the game that was held in Dubai for the first time at the end of 2015. Abdul-Aziz Abdul-Shafi led the Red Giants to a 3–2 win over Zamalek to add the ninth Egyptian Super Cup in the club's history.

Al Ahly won the league title after only missing only one season in 2015–16, a seven-point difference between the defending champions Zamalek. Ahly finished the competition with the strongest attack and the strongest defense under the leadership of Dutchman Martin Jol who replaced the Portuguese coach Jose Peseiro who left the club in January to take over at Porto. Al Ahly won the Premier League title for the 39th time in club history before the end of the league with four rounds. Al Ahly also managed to play the 39th game in a row without losing any match at all competitions. Al Ahly has achieved a special record in the number of games without defeat with 30 games in the league. Under the leadership of Hossam El-Badry, Al Ahly was able to keep a clean sheet in 30 games this season in various local and continental competitions so far this season.

Al Ahly won the Egyptian Cup for the 36th time in his history after beating Al Masry 2–1 in a strong match at the Egyptian Cup final at Borg El Arab Stadium. Al Masry scored in the 102nd minute before Amr Gamal equalized in the 117th minute and Ahmed Fathy added the winning goal in the 120th minute.

=== Mahmoud El Khatib Era & Return to African Triumph (2017–Present) ===
On 1 December 2017 Mahmoud El Khatib was elected as the new club president. El Khatib won the polls ahead of Mahmoud Taher. El Khatib won 20,956 votes while Taher, who had been president since 2014 until 2017, polled 13,182. In the race to be vice-president Mustafa Fahmy collected 14,269 votes compared to former Egyptian sports minister El Amry Farouk who won 19,923 votes.

Al Ahly won the Egyptian Super Cup title for the tenth time in its history, after defeating Al Masry SC 1–0, in the match that was held on 12 January 2019 at the Hazza bin Zayed Stadium Al Ain, United Arab Emirates. The winning goal was scored by Walid Azaro in the 12th minute of the first extra half of the match, which gave the Red Devils the title.

The first football team in Al Ahly managed to clinch the Egyptian Premier League for the third consecutive season under the leadership of the manager Hossam El-Badry, and fortieth in its history, reaching the fourth star. Al Ahly officially won the title 6 weeks before the end of the championship, achieving the second fastest league in its history after the historic 2004–05 Egyptian Premier League season.

Al Ahly managed to win the 2018–19 Egyptian Premier League title for the fourth consecutive season and for the 41st in its history under the leadership of the Uruguayan manager Martín Lasarte, after defeating Al Mokawloon Al Arab 3–1 in a meeting that gathered the two on 23 July 2019. This result put Ahly five points clear of their rivals Zamalek with one game of the league season left to play. Al Ahly winning the 2018–19 Egyptian Premier League Shield raised the club tournaments to 136 trophies. This made Al Ahly the most crowned club in the world with 20 continental titles: 9 Champions Leagues, one Confederation Cup, 4 Cup Winners' Cups, 6 Super Cups and one Afro-Asian Club Championship. Al Ahly won CAF Champions League in 1982 and 1987. They triumphed again in 2001, 2005, 2006 and 2008 under the coaching of the Portuguese Manuel José, in 2012 and finally in 2013 under the coaching of Hossam El-Badry in 2012 and Mohamed Youssef in 2013; making them the most crowned team in Africa. At the national level, Al Ahly achieved 41 Egyptian Premier League and 36 Egypt Cup, 11 Egyptian Super Cup title, and 7 Sultan Hussein Cup, 16 Cairo League more than any other club, along with winning the cup of the United Arab Republic on one occasion and the cup of the Egyptian Confederation Cup once also.

On 31 August, Rene Weiler was named as the new coach of Al Ahly. Weiler replaced Martin Lasarte who was sacked despite guiding Ahly to win the Egyptian Premier League title with a game to spare. Weiler was able to win his first title with the club in less than one month as Al Ahly managed to win the Egyptian Super Cup for the 11th time in the club history after defeating Zamalek 3–2 in the match that gathered the two teams on 20 September 2019 at the Borg El Arab Stadium. The Nigerian striker Junior Ajayi scored the first and third goals in Zamalek, to become the second foreigner to score in the history of the Egyptian Super Cup. The first foreign player to score in the tournament was Moroccan striker Walid Azaro when he scored the winning goal against Al Masry in the 2017–18 Egyptian Super Cup. However, Junior Ajayi became the first foreign player to score two goals in Egyptian Super Cup. On September 18, after Zamalek's loss to Aswan SC, Al Ahly won their 42nd Egyptian Premier League title in the 2019-20 season; this was the second title for the Swiss manager Rene Weiler before he left the club and replaced by Pitso Mosimane, the first South African manager in the history of the club.

On November 27, Al Ahly faced Zamalek in the 2020 CAF Champions League Final, which Al Ahly won 2–1 with goals from El Solia and Afsha in the 86th minute to clinch their ninth title and their first since 2013. No other club has won the CAF Champions League Final more than five times. About a week later, Al Ahly defeated El-Gaish in the Egypt Cup Final 3–2 on penalties. With this Victory, Al Ahly won the treble for the third time in their history, also becoming the first African team to complete the continental treble three times.

The FIFA Club World Cup was up next in February. In the first match, Al Ahly defeated the hosts Al Duhail thanks to a wonderful strike from Hussein El Shahat, sending Al Ahly to its first official match with the European champs FC Bayern Munich in the Semi-finals. Bayern were able to defeat Al Ahly 2–0 by a brace scored by Robert Lewandowski. However, Al Ahly was able to secure the bronze medal for the second time in the club's history after defeating Palmeiras, the winners of the 2020 Copa Libertadores in the Third place play off, becoming the first and only Arab or African team to have won two medals in the tournament.

== See also ==
- List of Al Ahly SC records and statistics
- History of Zamalek SC
- Football in Egypt
