= List of Al Ahly SC records and statistics =

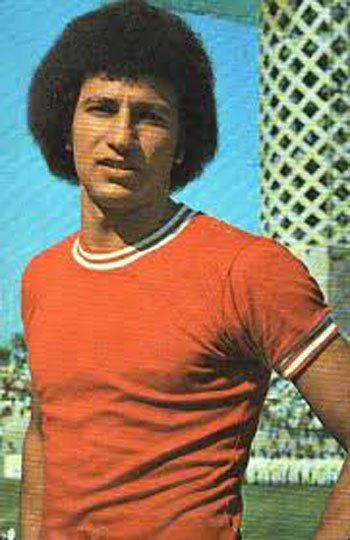
Mahmoud El Khatib Al Ahly's all-time top-scorer with 159 goals in all competitions

Al Ahly Sporting Club (Arabic: النادي الأهلى للرياضة البدنية), commonly referred to as AlAhly, is an Egyptian professional football club based in Cairo, It is known as "The Club of the Century" in African football. It is best known for its professional football team that plays in the Egyptian Premier League, the top tier in the Egyptian football league system, and is the most decorated football club in the world. It was founded on 24 April 1907, as a gathering place for Cairo's Student Unions.

Al Ahly has a record of 44 national league titles, 39 national cup titles, and 15 national super cup titles, making them the most decorated club in Egypt. In addition, Al Ahly has never been relegated to the Egyptian Second Division. In international competitions, the club has won a record twelve CAF Champions League titles, a CAF Confederation Cup, a record Eight CAF Super Cups, a record four African Cup Winners' Cups, an Afro-Asian Club Championship, an Arab Club Champions Cup, an Arab Cup Winners' Cup, a record two Arab Super Cups, and won a bronze medal in the 2006, 2020, 2021 and 2023 Club World Cup.

== Honours ==
Al Ahly winning the 2023 Egyptian Super Cup raised the club's trophy count to 155, making them the most decorated club in the world. This includes 26 continental titles. Al Ahly won the African Cup of Champions Clubs in 1982 and 1987. Following the tournament's rebranding as the CAF Champions League, Al Ahly triumphed again in 2001, 2005, 2006 and 2008 under the coaching of the Portuguese Manuel José, in 2012 under Hossam El-Badry, in 2013 under Mohamed Youssef, and in 2020 and 2021 under Pitso Mosimane. This makes them the most decorated team in continental competitions in Africa with eleven Champions League titles, as well as one CAF Confederation Cup, four African Cup Winners' Cups, eight CAF Super Cups and one Afro-Asian Club Championship. At local level, Al Ahly has won more titles than any other club, with 44 Egyptian Premier League titles, 39 Egypt Cups, 16 Egyptian Super Cups, 7 Sultan Hussein Cups and 15 Cairo League titles, along with winning the cup of the United Arab Republic on one occasion and the Egyptian Confederation Cup once as well.

=== Domestic (124 titles) ===
Type	Competition	Titles	Winning seasons	Runners up
Egyptian	Egyptian Premier League	45	1948–49, 1949–50, 1950–51, 1952–53, 1953–54, 1955–56, 1956–57, 1957–58, 1958–59, 1960–61, 1961–62, 1974–75, 1975–76, 1976–77, 1978–79, 1979–80, 1980–81, 1981–82, 1984–85, 1985–86, 1986–87, 1988–89, 1993–94, 1994–95, 1995–96, 1996–97, 1997–98, 1998–99, 1999–00, 2004–05, 2005–06, 2006–07, 2007–08, 2008–09, 2009–10, 2010–11, 2013–14, 2015–16, 2016–17, 2017–18, 2018–19, 2019–20, 2022–23, 2023–24, 2024–25	1966–67, 1977–78, 1983–84, 1987–88, 1990–91, 1992–93, 2000–01, 2001–02, 2002–03, 2003–04, 2014–15, 2020–21
Egyptian	Egypt Cup	39	1923–24, 1924–25, 1926–27, 1927–28, 1929–30, 1930–31, 1936–37, 1939–40, 1941–42, 1942–43, 1944–45, 1945–46, 1946–47, 1948–49, 1949–50, 1950–51, 1952–53, 1955–56, 1957–58, 1960–61, 1965–66, 1977–78, 1980–81, 1982–83, 1983–84, 1984–85, 1988–89, 1990–91, 1991–92, 1992–93, 1995–96, 2000–01, 2002–03, 2005–06, 2006–07, 2016–17, 2019–20, 2021–22, 2022–23	1925–26, 1931–32, 1932–33, 1934–35, 1937–38, 1943–44, 1951–52, 1958–59, 1972–73, 1975–76, 1996–97, 2003–04, 2009–10, 2014–15, 2015–16, 2020–21
Egyptian	Egyptian Super Cup	16	2003, 2005, 2006, 2007, 2008, 2010, 2011, 2014, 2015, 2017, 2018, 2021, 2022, 2023, 2024, 2025	2009, 2016, 2019, 2020
Egyptian	Sultan Hussein Cup	7	1922–23, 1924–25, 1925–26, 1926–27, 1928–29, 1930–31, 1937–38	1927–28, 1933–34, 1934–35, 1935–36
Egyptian	Cairo League	15	1924–25, 1926–27, 1927–28, 1930–31, 1934–35, 1935–36, 1936–37, 1937–38, 1938–39, 1941–42, 1942–43, 1945–46, 1947–48, 1949–50, 1957–58	1928–29, 1929–30, 1931–32, 1939–40, 1940–41, 1944–45, 1948–49, 1951–52
Egyptian	Egyptian Confederation Cup	1	1989	
	United Arab Republic Cup	1	1961	

=== Africa (25 titles) ===
Type	Competition	Titles	Winning seasons	Runners up
CAF	CAF Champions League	12	1982, 1987, 2001, 2005, 2006, 2008, 2012, 2013, 2019–20, 2020–21, 2022–23, 2023–24	1983, 2007, 2017, 2018, 2021–22
CAF	African Cup Winners' Cup	4	1984, 1985, 1986, 1993	–
CAF	CAF Confederation Cup	1	2014	–
CAF	CAF Super Cup	8	2002, 2006, 2007, 2009, 2013, 2014, 2021 (May), 2021 (December)	1994, 2015, 2023, 2024

=== Continental and intercontinental trophies (6 Titles) ===
Type	Competition	Titles	Winning seasons	Runners up
Intercontinental	African-Asian-Pacific Cup	1	2024	
Intercontinental	Afro-Asian Cup	1	1988	
UAFA	Arab Club Champions Cup	1	1996	1997
UAFA	Arab Cup Winners' Cup	1	1994	–
UAFA	Arab Super Cup	2^{S}	1997, 1998	–

- record
- ^{S} shared record

=== Awards & recognitions ===
- CAF Club of the 20th Century: 2001
- African Inter-Club Team of the Year (6): (2005), (2006), (2008), (2012), (2013), (2023)
- Globe soccer Top Titles Winners in the Middle East: 2020
- Globe Soccer for The Best Middle East Club: 2023
- First place in the monthly international rankings of football history and strength (2): June 2006, July 2007
- Certificate of Conformity to International Standards (ISO 9001:2015): 2020

=== All-time statistics ===
All stats correct as of 26 December 2021.

Competition	Matches	Wins	Draws	Losses	Win %
Egyptian Premier League	1,590	1,073	355	162	67.48
African Competitions	384	199	101	84	51.82

== Players records ==
- Youngest first-team player: Ramadan Sobhi – 17 years, 34 days (against Ghazl El Mahalla SC, 2013–14 Egyptian Premier League, 6 February 2014)

=== Most appearances ===
Competitive, professional matches only. Goals (in parentheses) included in total.

	Name	Years	League	Cup	Africa	World Cup	Other	Total
1	(Egypt) Hossam Ashour	2003–2020	292 (3)	37 (0)	156 (0)	11 (0)	16 (0)	512 (3)
2	(Egypt) Hady Khashaba	1991–2006	301 (26)	43 (5)	57 (3)	0 (0)	40 (1)	444 (42)
3	(Egypt) Essam El Hadary	1996–2008	306 (0)	17 (?)	91 (1)	3 (0)	4 (0)	421 (1)
4	(Egypt) Osama Orabi	1982–1999	280 (?)	? (?)	? (?)	0 (0)	? (?)	400 (?)
5	(Egypt) Wael Gomaa	2001–2014	241 (11)	18 (0)	114 (4)	11 (0)	15 (0)	399 (16)
6	(Egypt) Ahmed Fathy	2007–2014; 2015–2020	224 (16)	21 (4)	103 (5)	7 (0)	10 (1)	364 (26)
7	(Egypt) Shady Mohamed	1999–2009	203 (6)	25 (1)	89 (3)	7 (0)	13 (1)	337 (11)
8	(Egypt) Emad Moteab	2003–2018	190 (75)	24 (19)	93 (28)	9 (2)	4 (0)	320 (124)
9	(Egypt) Ahmed Shobair	1980–1997	222 (0)	32 (0)	49 (0)	0 (0)	12 (0)	316 (0)
10	(Egypt) Moustafa Abdou	1972–1987	234 (43)	? (?)	? (?)	0 (0)	0 (0)	311 (?)

=== Top goalscorers ===
==== All Competitions ====
Ranking	Name	Nationality	Years	Matches	Goals	Percentage%
1	Mahmoud El Khatib	Egypt	1972–1988	275	159	0.57
2	Hossam Hassan	Egypt	1984-1990; 1992–2000	301	142	0.47
3	Mohamed Aboutrika	Egypt	2004–2014	287	126	0.44
4	Emad Moteab	Egypt	2003–2018	320	124	0.39
5	Mokhtar El Tetsh	Egypt	1922–1940	119	112	1.19
6	Saleh Selim	Egypt	1948–1962; 1963–1967	202	100	0.49
7	Ahmed Mekkawi	Egypt	?	137	95	0.74
8	El Sayed Ateya (Toto)	Egypt	?	133	88	0.69
9	Taha Ismail	Egypt	1958–1970	199	81	0.41
10	Walid Soliman	Egypt	2011–2022	313	75	0.44

==== League ====
Ranking	Name	Nationality	Years	Goals
1	Mahmoud El Khatib	Egypt	1972–1988	109
2	Hossam Hassan	Egypt	1984–1990; 1992–2000	109
3	Mohamed Aboutrika	Egypt	2004–2014	79
4	Saleh Selim	Egypt	1948–1962; 1963–1967	78
5	El Sayed Ateya (Toto)	Egypt	?	75
6	Emad Moteab	Egypt	2003–2018	75
7	Taha Ismail	Egypt	1958–1970	64
8	Ahmad Belal	Egypt	2000–2005; 2007–2010	55
9	Abdallah El Said	Egypt	2011–2018	50
10	Felix Aboagye	Ghana	1993–1998	47

=== Africa ===
Ranking	Name	Nationality	Years	Goals
1	Mahmoud El Khatib	Egypt	1972–1988	37
2	Mohamed Aboutrika	Egypt	2004–2014	32
3	Emad Moteab	Egypt	2003–2018	28
4	Walid Soliman	Egypt	2011–2022	20
5	Mohamed Barakat	Egypt	2004–2013	18
6	Flávio Amado	Angola	2005–2009	18
7	Hossam Hassan	Egypt	1984–1990; 1992–2000	17
8	Ayman Shawky	Egypt	1984–1995	15
9	Walid Azaro	Morocco	2017–2020	13
10	Taher Abouzeid	Egypt	1980–1993	13

== Individual honours ==
=== Player of the season ===
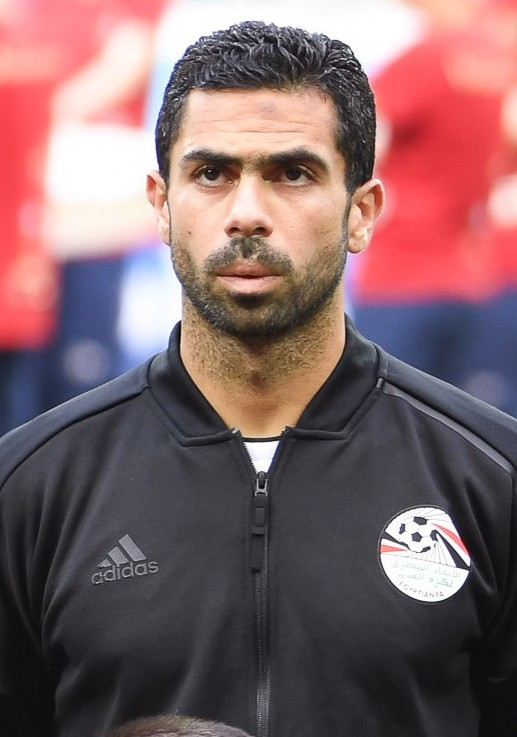
Ahmed Fathy, one of the club legends.

Season	Nationality	Player
2022–2023	Tunisia	Ali Maâloul
2019–2020	Egypt	Mohamed El Shenawy
2018–2019	Tunisia	Ali Maâloul
2017–2018	Morocco	Walid Azaro
2016–2017	Egypt	Saad Samir
2015–2016	Egypt	Abdallah El Said
2014–2015	Egypt	Moamen Zakaria
2013–2014	Egypt	Ahmed Fathy
2012–2013	Egypt	Mohamed Aboutrika
2010–2011	Egypt	Ahmed Fathy
2009–2010	Egypt	Mohamed Barakat

== Players' individual honours and awards while playing with Al Ahly ==
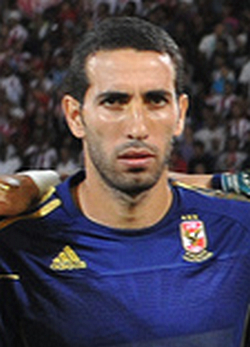
Mohamed Aboutrika, one of the club legends.

- African Footballer of the Year:
  - (Egypt) Mahmoud El Khatib (1): 1983
- African Inter-Club Player of the Year:
  - (Egypt) Mohamed Aboutrika (4): 2006, 2008, 2012, 2013
  - (Egypt) Mohamed Barakat (1): 2005
  - (Egypt) Ahmed Hassan (1): 2010
  - (Egypt) Mohamed El Shenawy (1): 2022
  - (South Africa) Percy Tau (1): 2023
- EFA Egyptian Player of the Year:
  - (Egypt) Mohamed Aboutrika (4): 2005, 2006, 2007, 2008
  - (Egypt) Abdallah El Said (1): 2016
- Egyptian Premier League top scorer:
  - (Egypt) El-Dhizui (1): 1958–59
  - (Egypt) Mahmoud El Khatib (2): 1977–78, 1980–81
  - (Egypt) Mohamed Ramadan (1): 1990–91
  - (Egypt) Hossam Hassan (1): 1998–99
  - (Egypt) Ahmad Belal (1): 2002–03
  - (Egypt) Emad Moteab (1): 2004–05
  - (Egypt) Mohamed Aboutrika (1): 2005–06
  - (Angola) Flávio Amado (2): 2006–07, 2008–09
  - (Morocco) Walid Azaro (1): 2017–18
  - (Egypt) Mohamed Sherif (1): 2020–21
  - (Palestine) Wessam Abou Ali (1): 2023–24
  - (Egypt) Emam Ashour (1): 2024–25
- CAF Team of the Tournament:
  - (Egypt) Wael Gomaa (3): 2006 2008 2010
  - (Egypt) Taher Abouzeid (2): 1984 1986
  - (Egypt) Mohamed Aboutrika (2): 2006 2008
  - (Egypt) Essam El Hadary (2): 2006 2008
  - (Egypt) Mahmoud El Khatib (1): 1980
  - (Egypt) Rabie Yassin (1): 1986
  - (Egypt) Magdi Abdelghani (1): 1986
  - (Egypt) Moustafa Abdou (1): 1986
  - (Egypt) Ahmed Shobair (1): 1994
  - (Egypt) Hossam Hassan (1): 1998
  - (Egypt) Mohamed Emara (1): 1998
  - (Egypt) Ahmed Fathy (1): 2010
  - (Egypt) Ahmed Hassan (1): 2010
  - (Egypt) Ahmed Hegazi (1): 2017
  - (Egypt) Mohamed Abdelmonem (1): 2021
- CAF Team of the Year:
  - (Egypt) Mahmoud El Khatib (1): 1980
  - (Egypt) Mohamed Barakat (1): 2005
  - (Egypt) Essam El Hadary (1): 2006
  - (Egypt) Wael Gomaa (4): 2005, 2008, 2009, 2010
  - (Egypt) Mohamed Aboutrika (4): 2006, 2008, 2012, 2013
  - (Egypt) Ahmed Hassan (1): 2010
  - (Egypt) Ahmed Fathy (3): 2012, 2013, 2017
  - (Tunisia) Ali Maâloul (1): 2017
  - (Nigeria) Junior Ajayi (1): 2017
- BBC African Footballer of the Year:
  - (Egypt) Mohamed Barakat (1): 2005
  - (Egypt) Mohamed Aboutrika (1): 2008
- CAF Goalkeeper of the Year:
  - (Egypt) Essam El Hadary (4): 2001, 2006, 2007, 2008
- FIFA Club World Cup Top Goalscorer:
  - (Egypt) Mohamed Aboutrika (1): 2006
  - (Egypt) Yasser Ibrahim (1): 2021
  - (Tunisia) Ali Maâloul (1): 2023

== Team records ==
=== Matches ===
==== Firsts ====
- First Egyptian League match: Al Ahly 5–0 Greek Alexandria 24 October 1948.
- First Egypt Cup match: Al Ahly ? Nile FC, 1921-1922 Egypt Cup first round.
- First African match: MC Alger 3–0 Al Ahly, 1976 African Cup of Champions Clubs Second round.

==== Record wins ====
- Record league win: 8–0 against Ismaily, 1957–58 Egyptian League, 4 April 1958
- Record Cup win: 13–0 against El Gouna, 2014–15 Egypt Cup round of 16, 13 August 2015
- Record African win: 9–0 against Atlabara, 2019–20 CAF Champions League qualifying rounds, 23 August 2019

=== League ===
==== Points ====
- Most points in a season (record):
  - 89 points in the 2019–20 season (Egyptian League record).
- Highest Point Average (record):
  - 2.84 points during the 2004–05 season (Egyptian League Record).

==== Goals ====
- Season with most goals scored in League matches (record):
  - 75 goals scored in the 2017–18.
- Highest Goal Average Scored by a club in 1 season (record):
  - 3.06 in 1957–58 season (Egyptian League Record).
- Season with fewest goals conceded in League matches (record):
  - The club conceded a total number of 2 goals in 23 games in the 1975–76 season.
- Lowest Goals Received Average by a season (record):
  - 0.09 in the 1975–76 season (Egyptian League Record).

==== Streaks ====
- Consecutive Egyptian League titles (record):
  - Won 9 championship titles: 1948–49, 1949–50, 1950–51, 1952–53, 1953–54, 1955–56, 1956–57, 1957–58, 1958–59 seasons.
- Longest consecutive unbeaten matches in the league (record):
  - 71 (between loss to Zamalek on 15 May 2004 and loss to Ismaily on 25 May 2007)
- Longest consecutive unbeaten matches in one league season (record):
  - 26 games during the 1974–75 season.

=== Record transfer fee paid ===
Ranking	Name	Nationality	From	Transfer Fee (€ millions)	Year	Ref
1	Hussein El Shahat	Egypt	(United Arab Emirates) Al Ain	€4.35m	2019	
2	Junior Ajayi	Nigeria	(Tunisia) Sfaxien	€2.50m	2016	
3	Malick Evouna	Gabon	(Morocco) Wydad	€2.25m	2015	
4	Aliou Badji	Senegal	(Austria) Rapid Wien	€2.00m	2020	
5	Percy Tau	South Africa	(England) Brighton & Hove Albion	€1.80m	2021	

=== Record transfer fee received ===
Ranking	Name	Nationality	To	Transfer Fee (€ millions)	Year	Ref
1	Malick Evouna	Gabon	(China) Tianjin	€7.25m	2016	
2	Wessam Abou Ali	Palestine	(United States) Columbus Crew	€6.42m	2025	
3	Ahmed Hegazi	Egypt	(England) West Bromwich Albion	€5.00m	2017	
4	Ramadan Sobhi	Egypt	(England) Stoke City	€5.00m	2016	
5	Mohamed Abdelmonem	Egypt	(France) Nice	€4.20m	2024	
6	Hamdy Fathy	Egypt	Qatar	€3.00m	2023	
7	Flávio Amado	Angola	(Saudi Arabia) Al Shabab	€2.75m	2009	

== See also ==
- History of Al Ahly SC
- List of Zamalek SC records and statistics
