= 2001 CAF Champions League final =

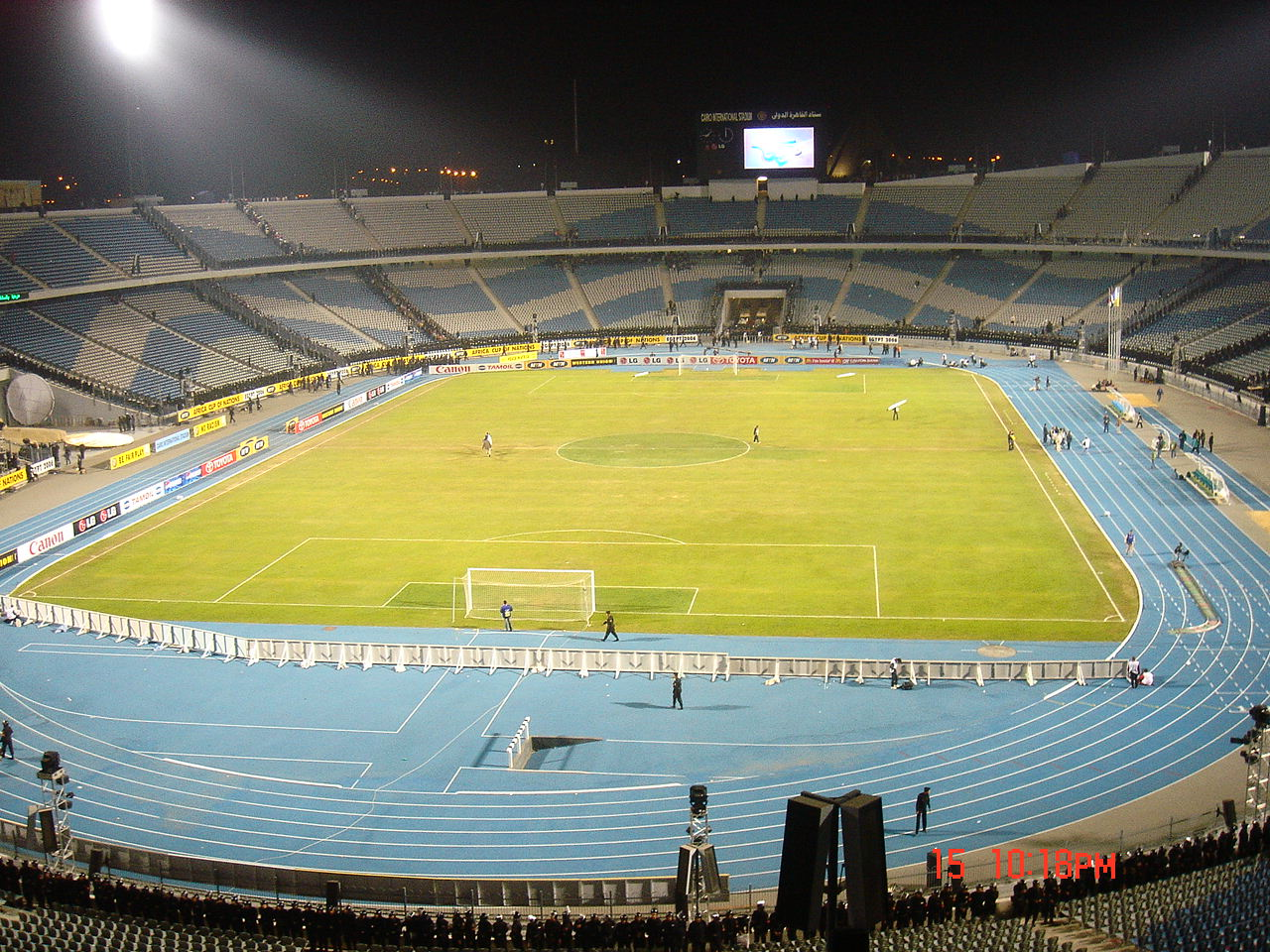
- Cairo International Stadium hosted the podium where Al Ahly lifted the trophy
- Event: 2001 CAF Champions League
Mamelodi Sundowns	Al Ahly
(South Africa)	(Egypt)
1	4
- Al-Ahly won 4–1 on aggregate

First leg
Mamelodi Sundowns	Al Ahly
1	1
- Date: 8 December 2001
- Venue: Loftus Versfeld Stadium, Pretoria
- Referee: Coffi Codjia (Benin)
- Attendance: 5,000

Second leg
Al Ahly	Mamelodi Sundowns
3	0
- Date: 21 December 2001
- Venue: Cairo International Stadium, Cairo
- Referee: Abderrahim El Arjoun (Morocco)
- Attendance: 75,000

The 2001 CAF Champions League final was the final of the 2001 CAF Champions League.

It was a football tie held over two legs in December 2001 between Al-Ahly of Egypt, and Mamelodi Sundowns of South Africa.

Al-Ahly won the final with aggregate 4-1, first leg 1-1 and second 3-0

== Qualified teams ==
In the following table, finals until 1996 were in the African Cup of Champions Club era, since 1997 were in the CAF Champions League era.

Team	Region	Previous finals appearances (bold indicates winners)
(South Africa) Mamelodi Sundowns	COSAFA (Southern Africa)	none
(Egypt) Al Ahly	UNAF (North Africa)	**1982**, 1983, **1987**

== Venues ==
=== Loftus Versfeld Stadium ===
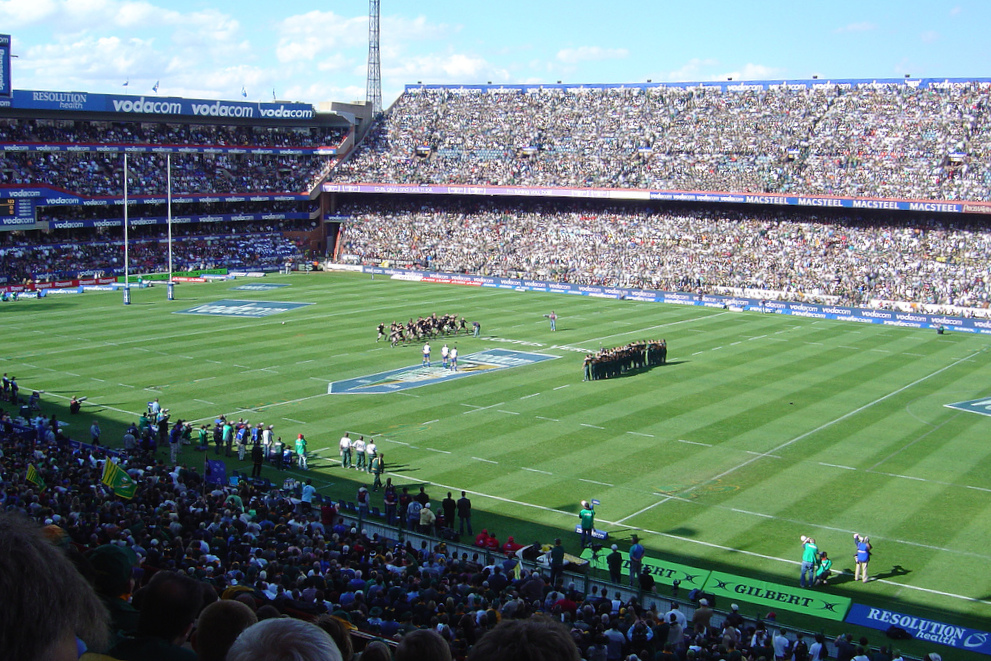
Loftus Versfeld Stadium in Pretoria, South Africa hosted the first leg.

Loftus Versfeld Stadium is a rugby and football stadium situated in the Arcadia suburb of Pretoria, Gauteng, South Africa. The stadium has a capacity of 51,762 for rugby union and it is occasionally used for football matches.

The stadium was named after Robert Loftus Owen Versfeld, the founder of organized sports in Pretoria. Through the years the stadium has undergone various name changes as sponsors came and went, though locals have always referred to the stadium as Loftus Versfeld.

The stadium is the home ground of the Bulls franchise of the Super Rugby tournament and the Blue Bulls union in South Africa's Currie Cup. Also home ground for the South African premier soccer league champions Mamelodi Sundowns.

Also, the South Africa national rugby union team has played several test matches at the Loftus Versfeld Stadium. They played New Zealand in 1970, 1996, and 1999, Australia in 1967, 1997, 2001, England in 1994 and 2000, and Ireland in 1998.

=== Cairo International Stadium ===
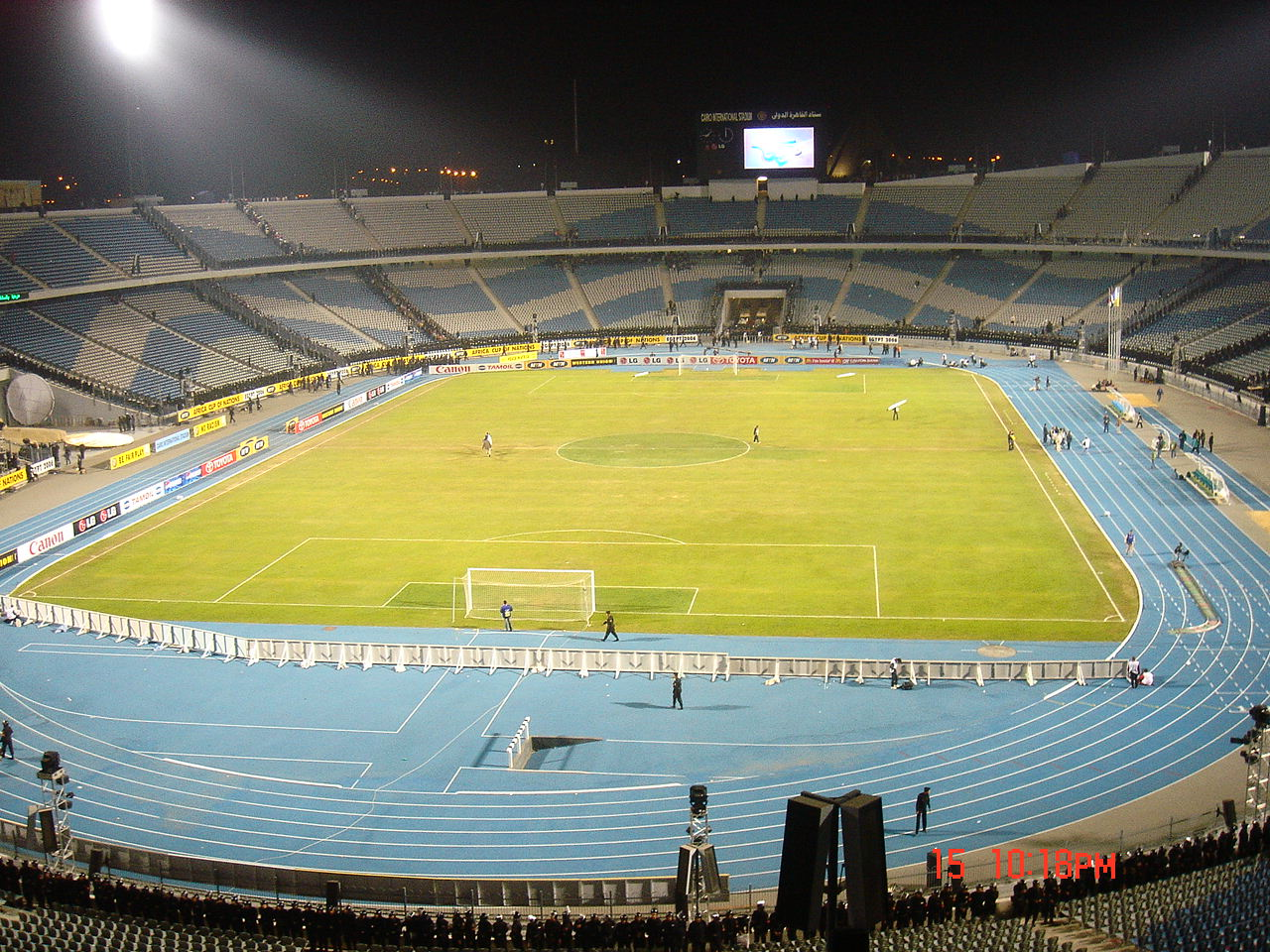
International Stadium in Cairo, Egypt hosted the second leg.

Cairo International Stadium, formerly known as Nasser Stadium, is an Olympic-standard, multi-use stadium with an all-seated capacity of 75,000. The architect of the stadium is the German Werner March, who had built from 1934 to 1936 the Olympic Stadium in Berlin. Before becoming an all seater stadium, it had the ability to hold over 100,000 spectators, reaching a record of 120,000. It is the foremost Olympic-standard facility befitting the role of Cairo, Egypt as the center of events in the region. It is also the 69th largest stadium in the world. Located in Nasr City; a suburb north east of Cairo, it was completed in 1960, and was inaugurated by President Gamal Abd El Nasser on 23 July that year, the eighth anniversary of the Egyptian Revolution of 1952. Zamalek SC currently use the Petro Sport Stadium for most of their home games and Al Ahly use Al Salam Stadium for most of their home games.

== Road to final ==
(South Africa) Mamelodi Sundowns				Round	(Egypt) Al Ahly			
Opponent	Agg.	1st leg	2nd leg	Qualifying rounds	Opponent	Agg.	1st leg	2nd leg
(Mozambique) Costa do Sol	2–0	0–0 (H)	2–0 (A)	First round	(Eritrea) Red Sea FC	3–1	3–0 (H)	0–1 (A)
(Tanzania) Young Africans	6–5	3–2 (H)	3–3 (A)	Second round	(Seychelles) St.-Michel United	6–0	5–0 (H)	1–0 (A)
Opponent	Result			Group stage	Opponent	Result		
(Tunisia) ES Tunis	0–0 (H)			Matchday 1	(Angola) Petro Atlético	3–1 (A)		
(Nigeria) Julius Berger	0–2 (A)			Matchday 2	(Algeria) CR Belouizdad	1–0 (H)		
(Democratic Republic of the Congo) TP Mazembe	0–0 (A)			Matchday 3	(Ivory Coast) ASEC Mimosas	0–1 (A)		
(Democratic Republic of the Congo) TP Mazembe	1–0 (H)			Matchday 4	(Ivory Coast) ASEC Mimosas	2–1 (H)		
(Tunisia) ES Tunis	0–0 (A)			Matchday 5	(Angola) Petro Atlético	2–4 (H)		
(Nigeria) Julius Berger	1–0 (H)			Matchday 6	(Algeria) CR Belouizdad	1–0 (A)		
Group A Winner: Pos / Team / Pld / W / D / L / GF / GA / GD / Pts / Qualification; 1 / (Tunisia) ES Tunis / 6 / 2 / 3 / 1 / 8 / 7 / +1 / **9** / Advance to knockout stage; 2 / (South Africa) Mamelodi Sundowns / 6 / 2 / 3 / 1 / 2 / 2 / 0 / **9** / Advance to knockout stage; 3 / (Nigeria) Julius Berger / 6 / 2 / 1 / 3 / 6 / 6 / 0 / **7**; 4 / (Democratic Republic of the Congo) TP Mazembe / 6 / 2 / 1 / 3 / 5 / 6 / −1 / **7**; Source:				Final standings	Group B Winner: Pos / Team / Pld / W / D / L / GF / GA / GD / Pts / Qualification; 1 / (Angola) Petro Atlético / 6 / 4 / 0 / 2 / 10 / 8 / +2 / **12** / Advance to knockout stage; 2 / (Egypt) Al Ahly / 6 / 4 / 0 / 2 / 9 / 7 / +2 / **12** / Advance to knockout stage; 3 / (Ivory Coast) ASEC Mimosas / 6 / 3 / 1 / 2 / 12 / 5 / +7 / **10**; 4 / (Algeria) CR Belouizdad / 6 / 0 / 1 / 5 / 2 / 13 / −11 / **1**; Source:			
Opponent	Agg.	1st leg	2nd leg	Knock-out stage	Opponent	Agg.	1st leg	2nd leg
(Angola) Petro Atlético	2–2 (5-3 p)	2–0 (H)	0–2 (A)	Semifinals	(Tunisia) ES Tunis	1–1 (a)	0–0 (H)	1–1 (A)

== Format ==
The final was decided over two legs, with aggregate goals used to determine the winner. If the sides were level on aggregate after the second leg, the away goals rule would have been applied, and if still level, the tie would have proceeded directly to a penalty shootout (no extra time is played).

== Matches ==
=== First leg ===
8 December 2001
--:-- UTC+2

Mamelodi Sundowns (South Africa)	1–1	(Egypt) Al Ahly
Kampamba 26'		Abdel Hafeez 58'

Loftus Versfeld Stadium, Pretoria
Attendance: 5,000
Referee: Coffi Codjia (Benin)

=== Second leg ===
21 December 2001
--:-- UTC+2

Al Ahly (Egypt)	3–0	(South Africa) Mamelodi Sundowns
Bebo 37' (pen.), 45', 90'

Cairo International Stadium, Cairo
Attendance: 75,000
Referee: Abderrahim El Arjoun (Morocco)
