= 1987 African Cup of Champions Clubs final =

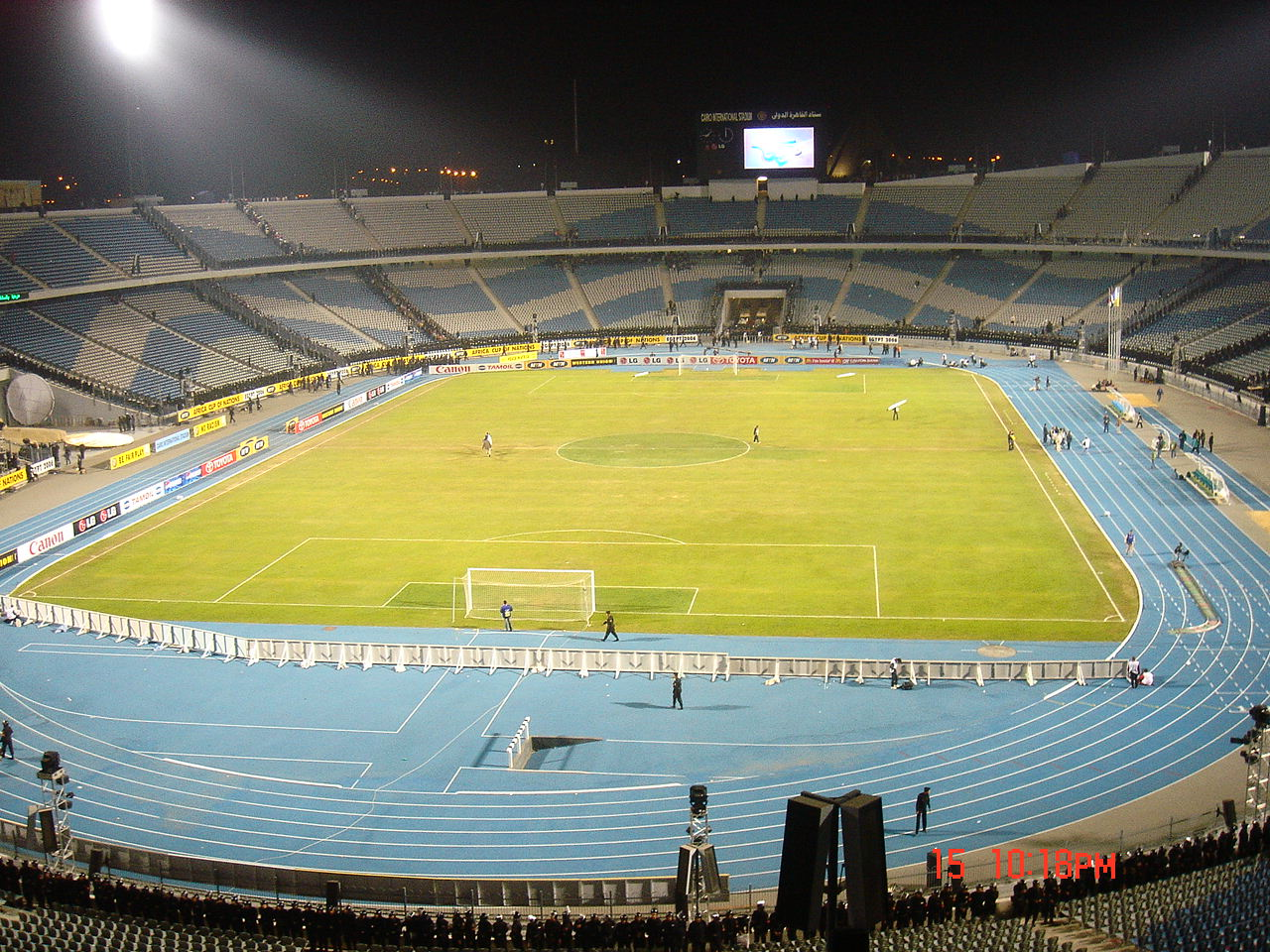
- Cairo International Stadium hosted the podium where Al Ahly lifted the trophy
- Event: 1987 African Cup of Champions Clubs
Al-Hilal	Al Ahly
(Sudan)	(Egypt)
0	2
- Al Ahly won 2–0 on aggregate

First leg
Al-Hilal	Al Ahly
0	0
- Date: 29 November 1987
- Venue: Khartoum Stadium, Khartoum
- Attendance: 50,000

Second leg
Al Ahly	Al-Hilal
2	0
- Date: 18 December 1987
- Venue: Cairo International Stadium, Cairo
- Attendance: 80,000

The 1987 African Cup of Champions Clubs final was the final of the 1987 African Cup of Champions Clubs.

It was a football tie held over two legs in December 1987 between Al Ahly of Egypt, and Al-Hilal Club of Sudan. The second leg was the last match for the Egyptian legend Mahmoud El Khatib who announced his retirement three days after the match.

Al Ahly won the final with aggregate 2–0, first leg 0-0 and second 2–0.

== Qualified teams ==
Team	Region	Previous finals appearances (bold indicates winners)
(Sudan) Al-Hilal	UNAF (North Africa)	none
(Egypt) Al Ahly	UNAF (North Africa)	**1982**, 1983

== Venues ==
=== Khartoum International Stadium ===
The Khartoum International Stadium is a multi-purpose stadium in Khartoum, Sudan. It is currently used mostly for football matches. The stadium has a capacity of 23,000 people. It is also the home stadium of the Sudanese national football team and of the club Al Ahli SC Khartoum. In 2010, it was renovated for the 2011 African cup of nations championships .

=== Cairo International Stadium ===
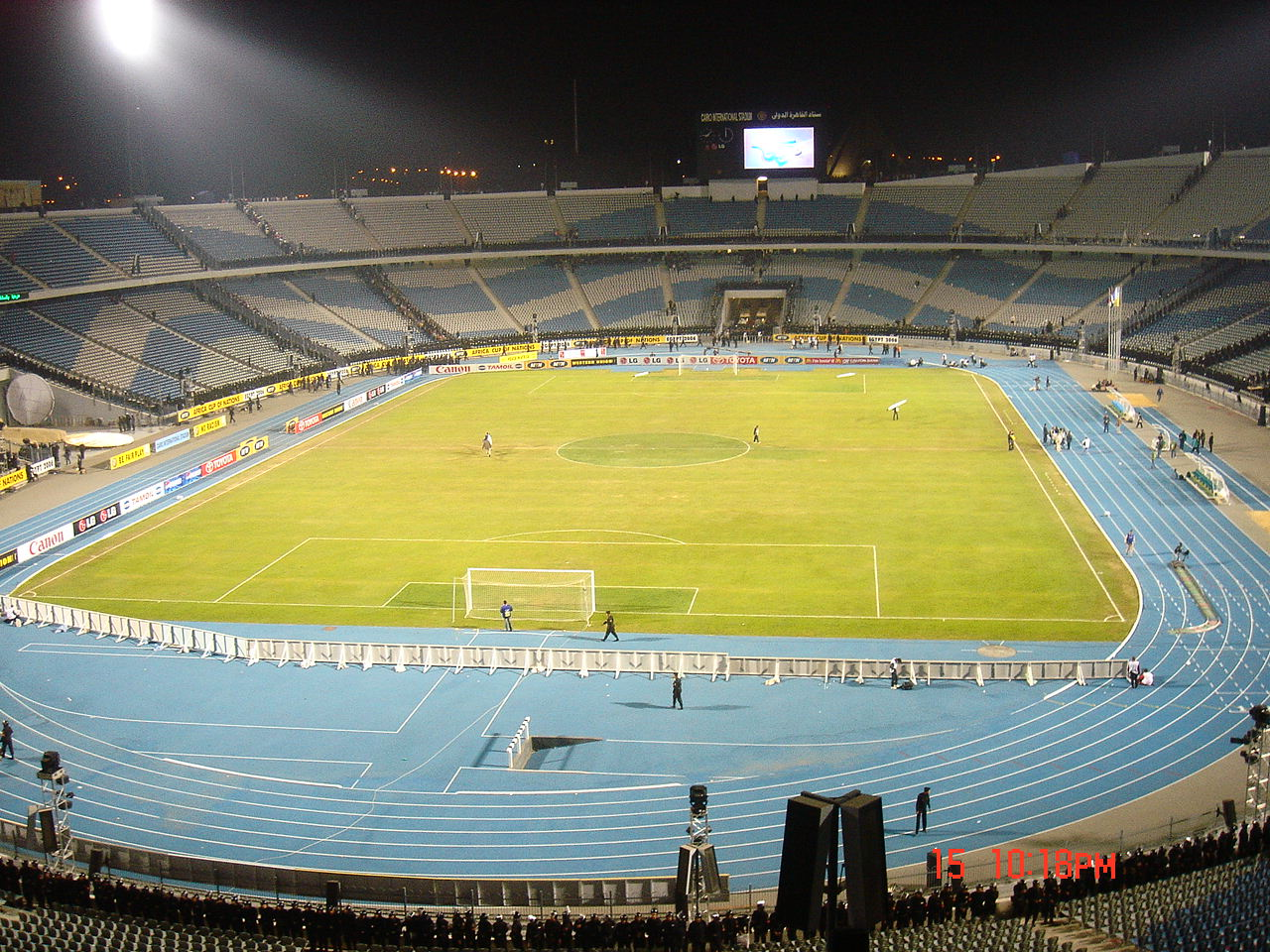
International Stadium in Cairo, Egypt hosted the second leg.

Cairo International Stadium, formerly known as Nasser Stadium, is an Olympic-standard, multi-use stadium with an all-seated capacity of 75,000. The architect of the stadium is the German Werner March, who had built from 1934 to 1936 the Olympic Stadium in Berlin. Before becoming an all seater stadium, it had the ability to hold over 100,000 spectators, reaching a record of 120,000. It is the foremost Olympic-standard facility befitting the role of Cairo, Egypt as the center of events in the region. It is also the 69th largest stadium in the world. Located in Nasr City; a suburb north east of Cairo, it was completed in 1960, and was inaugurated by President Gamal Abd El Nasser on 23 July that year, the eighth anniversary of the Egyptian Revolution of 1952.

== Road to final ==
(Sudan) Al-Hilal				Round	(Egypt) Al Ahly			
Opponent	Agg.	1st leg	2nd leg	First Round	Opponent	Agg.	1st leg	2nd leg
(Burundi) AS Inter Star	3–0	2–0 (H)	1–0 (A)	First round	(Rwanda) Panthères Noires	5–1	4–0 (H)	1–1 (A)
(Uganda) SC Villa	2–2	1–0 (H)	1–2 (A)	Second round	(Kenya) AFC Leopards	7–2	6–0 (H)	1–2 (A)
(Nigeria) Leventis United	2–1	2–1 (H)	0–0 (A)	Quarter-Finals	(Ivory Coast) Africa Sports	2–2 (4-2 p)	2–0 (H)	0–2 (A)
(Cameroon) Canon Yaoundé	1–1 (4-1 p)	1–0 (H)	0–1 (A)	Semi-Finals	(Ghana) Asante Kotoko	2–1	2–0 (H)	0–1 (A)

== Format ==
The final was decided over two legs, with aggregate goals used to determine the winner. If the sides were level on aggregate after the second leg, the away goals rule would have been applied, and if still level, the tie would have proceeded directly to a penalty shootout (no extra time is played).

== Matches ==
=== First leg ===
29 November 1987
--:-- UTC+2

Al-Hilal Club (Sudan)	0–0	(Egypt) Al Ahly

Khartoum Stadium, Khartoum
Attendance: 50,000

=== Second leg ===
18 December 1987
--:-- UTC+2

Al Ahly (Egypt)	2–0	(Sudan) Al-Hilal
Jamal Thaalab 5' (o.g.); Shawky 43'

Cairo International Stadium, Cairo
Attendance: 80,000
