= Football Club of Greeks of Alexandria =

Egyptian football club

- Formation: 1910
- Type: Sports club
- Location: Alexandria, Egypt
- Affiliations: Greek community of Alexandria

The Football Club of Greeks of Alexandria or "Greek Football Club", often mentioned, was founded in 1910 by Greek of the city gather every Sunday and played soccer being Ron Pointe.

== History ==
The club was founded in 1910 by Greek residents of Alexandria, at a time when the city had a large and economically influential Greek population. Sporting and cultural clubs played an important role in community life, providing social cohesion and recreational opportunities.

Like other diaspora clubs, the Football Club of Greeks of Alexandria was formed by local enthusiasts and amateur players, reflecting broader trends in the spread of football among Greek communities outside Greece. In 1911 the chair of the group took his son Emmanuel Benaki, Alexander.

== Action ==
The club used the Shatby stadium and the rent was paid by the chairman Alexander Benakis. Chaired by the Football Club has created a significant group of players: K. Salvagos, G. Vassiliadis, P. Vassiliadis, Al. Vassiliadis, D. Father, author, C. Melas, G. Armantzopoulo, A. Chrambanis, A. loss, etc. After the death of the president took Benaki N. Kanavos.

In 1927 the squad for the Group included: Balis, Skouloudis, Andreadis, Papafingos, Klonaris, Marinakis, Marinakis, Michelepis, Craps, Makris, Michaelides, Papadopoulos Valianatos, Yannis Ioannidis, Michelis, Patrinos et al.

After the war, the Group merged with the Athletic Union of Greek Alexandria, forming part of football.

== Sources ==
- This article is the translation of el:Ποδοσφαιρικός Όμιλος Ελλήνων Αλεξάνδρειας
