= Walid Azaro =

Moroccan footballer (born 1995)

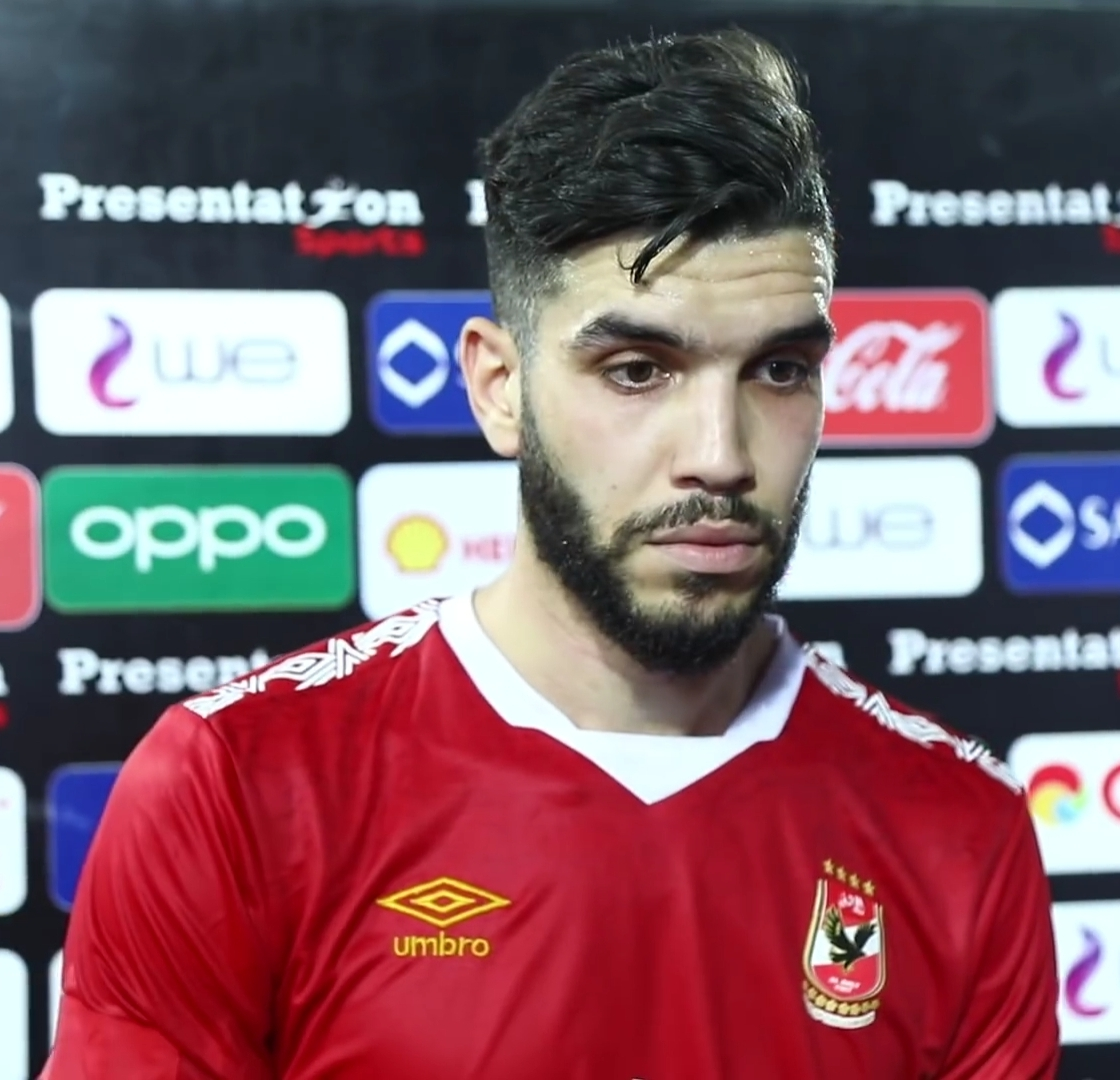
- Azaro with Al Ahly in 2020

Personal information
- Full name: Walid Azaro
- Date of birth: 11 June 1995 (age 31)
- Place of birth: Ait Melloul, Morocco
- Height: 1.86 m (6 ft 1 in)
- Position: Striker

Team information
- Current team: Ajman
- Number: 9

Youth career
- 2008–2015: Adrar Union Athletique Souss

Senior career*
Years	Team	Apps	(Gls)
2015–2017	Difaâ El Jadidi	53	(18)
2017–2020	Al Ahly	60	(26)
2020	→ Al-Ettifaq (loan)	7	(3)
2020–2022	Al-Ettifaq	42	(11)
2022–	Ajman	71	(33)

International career^{‡}
2017–	Morocco A'	15	(11)
2017–	Morocco	15	(1)
Medal record
Representing Morocco
Men's football
FIFA Arab Cup
Winner	2025 Qatar	Team
- * Club domestic league appearances and goals as of 1 February 2025 (UTC) ‡ National team caps and goals as of 17 October 2024 (UTC)

Walid Azaro (Arabic: وليد أزارو; born 11 June 1995) is a Moroccan professional footballer who plays as a striker for Ajman and the Morocco national team.

== Club career ==
Azaro was born in Aït Melloul. He started his career with Adrar Souss in the third division of the Moroccan league. He joined Difaâ Hassani El Jadidi in 2015, signing for them on a three-year contract. During the 2016–17 season, he finished as the club's top goalscorer with twelve league goals.

In June 2017, Azaro turned down several offers from European clubs to join Egyptian Premier League club Al Ahly on a four-year deal for a fee of $1.4 million, despite Moroccan national team manager Hervé Renard attempting to convince him to move to Europe. His transfer saw him become the first Moroccan to play for the club.

In his first season with the club, Azaro scored 18 league goals to finish as the top goalscorer in the Egyptian Premier League and help Al-Ahly win their 40th league title. His tally saw him break the record for the most goals scored by a foreign player in the Egyptian Premier League, surpassing the previous record of 17 jointly held by Flávio Amado and John Utaka. He also surpassed Stanley Ohawuchi's record for the most goals scored in the Egyptian Premier League by a player in their first season. He also scored the only goal of the 2017 Egyptian Super Cup and scored a hat-trick against Tunisian side Étoile Sportive du Sahel in the semi-final of the 2017 CAF Champions League. His performances attracted attention from several clubs and Al Ahly rejected an offer from Saudi club Al-Nassr of William Jebor plus a cash sum.

In October 2020, Azaro agreed to join Saudi club Al-Ettifaq on a permanent deal for two years, after being on loan since January. On 30 January 2022, Azaro was released by Al-Ettifaq.

In 2022, Azaro joined UAE club Ajman.

== Career statistics ==
=== Club ===
As of match played 1 February 2025

Club	Season	League			National cup (Note: Includes Moroccan Throne Cup, UAE President's Cup)		League cup (Note: Includes UAE League Cup)		Continental		Other		Total	
Club	Season	Division	Apps	Goals	Apps	Goals	Apps	Goals	Apps	Goals	Apps	Goals	Apps	Goals
DHJ	2015–16	Botola	25	6	2	1	–		–		–		27	7
DHJ	2016–17	Botola	28	12	5	2	–		–		–		33	14
DHJ	Total		53	18	8	3	–		–		–		61	21
Al Ahly	2017–18	EPL	30	18	1	1	–		8	6	2	2	41	27
Al Ahly	2018–19	EPL	23	6	1	0	–		14	5	1	0	39	11
Al Ahly	2019–20	EPL	7	2	1	2	–		4	1	–		12	5
Al Ahly	Total		60	26	3	3	–		26	12	3	2	92	43
Al-Ettifaq	2019-20	SPL	7	3	0	0	–		–		–		7	3
Al-Ettifaq	2020–21	SPL	25	9	1	0	–		–		–		26	9
Al-Ettifaq	2021–22	SPL	17	2	1	0	–		–		–		18	2
Al-Ettifaq	Total		49	14	2	0	–		–		–		51	14
Ajman	2021–22	UPL	12	5	0	0	0	0	–		–		12	5
Ajman	2022–23	UPL	26	12	5	2	1	0	–		–		32	14
Ajman	2023–24	UPL	20	12	2	0	2	2	–		–		24	14
Ajman	2024–25	UPL	12	4	1	0	2	1	–		–		15	5
Ajman	Total		71	33	8	2	5	3	–		–		84	38
Career total			233	91	21	8	5	3	26	12	3	2	288	116

=== International Goals ===
No.	Date	Venue	Opponent	Score	Result	Competition
1	11 December 2025	Khalifa International Stadium, Al Rayyan, Qatar	Syria	1–0	1–0	2025 FIFA Arab Cup

== International career ==
Azaro made his debut for Morocco on 24 March 2017 as a substitute during a 2–0 victory over Burkina Faso. He was named in Morocco's preliminary squad for the 2018 FIFA World Cup but was later omitted from the final squad.

Azaro participated in the 2025 FIFA Arab Cup with Morocco and scored v Syria to help Morocco advance to the semi finals and won best player award after shining against Syria. Azaro played vs UAE in the semi finals, the team won 3–0. In the final, Azaro played vs Jordan until the 105th minute, when Marouane Louadni replaced him. Morocco won the game 3–2.

== Honours ==
=== Club ===
Al Ahly

- Egyptian Premier League: 2017–18, 2018–19, 2019–20
- Egyptian Cup: 2016–17
- Egyptian Super Cup: 2018

=== International ===
Morocco

- FIFA Arab Cup: 2025

Individual

- (Mars d'Or) Moroccan Footballer of the Year: 2017
- Egyptian Premier League Best Striker: 2017–18
- Egyptian Premier League top goalscorer: 2017–18

== See also ==
- List of Al Ahly SC records and statistics
