= 2001 CAF Champions League =

Tournament details
- Dates: 18 February – 21 December
- Teams: 39 (from 39 associations)

Final positions
- Champions: (Egypt) Al Ahly (3rd title)
- Runners-up: (South Africa) Mamelodi Sundowns

Tournament statistics
- Matches played: 92
- Goals scored: 224 (2.43 per match)

The 2001 CAF Champions League was the 37th awarding of Africa's premier club football tournament prize organized by the Confederation of African Football (CAF), and the 5th prize under the CAF Champions League format.

In the knockout stage, was added the semifinal rounds so that the runners up as well as the winners from the group stage would progress. In the final, Al Ahly of Egypt defeated Mamelodi Sundowns of South Africa to win their third title.

== Qualifying rounds ==
=== Preliminary round ===
Team 1	Agg.	Team 2	1st leg	2nd leg
Real Banjul (The Gambia)	1–0	(Cape Verde) FC Derby	0–0	1–0
Inter Bom-Bom (São Tomé and Príncipe)	0–3	(Equatorial Guinea) Sony Elá Nguema	0–2	0–1
AS Fortior (Madagascar)	1–3	(Seychelles) St.-Michel United	0–0	1–3
Red Sea (Eritrea)	2–2 (4–2 p)	(Chad) Tourbillon FC	2–0	0–2
Anges de Fatima (Central African Republic)	1–1 (p)	(Rwanda) Rayon Sport	1–0	0–1
AS Marsouins (Réunion)	3–1	(Eswatini) Mbabane Highlanders	1–1	2–0
Mangasport (Gabon)	0–4	(Burkina Faso) USFA	0–1	0–3

=== First round ===
Team 1	Agg.	Team 2	1st leg	2nd leg
ASC Diaraf (Senegal)	2–1	(The Gambia) Real Banjul	1–0	1–1
ASEC Mimosas (Ivory Coast)	2–2 (4–3 p)	(Mali) Stade Malien	2–0	0–2
Julius Berger (Nigeria)	8–0	(Equatorial Guinea) Sony Elá Nguema	5–0	3–0
SC Villa (Uganda)	4–3	(Burundi) Vital'O FC	2–2	2–1
AS Marsouins (Réunion)	4–4 (a)	(Seychelles) St.-Michel United	3–2	1–2
Al Ahly (Egypt)	3–1	(Eritrea) Red Sea FC	3–0	0–1
ES Tunis (Tunisia)	4–1	(Niger) JS du Ténéré	1–0	3–1
Saint George (Ethiopia)	1–1 (a)	(Kenya) Tusker FC	1–1	0–0
Young Africans (Tanzania)	4–2	(Zimbabwe) Highlanders FC	2–2	2–0^{1}
Mamelodi Sundowns (South Africa)	2–0	(Mozambique) Costa do Sol	0–0	2–0
CR Belouizdad (Algeria)	3–1	(Libya) Al Ahli Tripoli	2–0	1–1
Al-Merrikh (Sudan)	4–1	(Zambia) Power Dynamos	2–0	2–1
Raja Casablanca (Morocco)	3–3 (a)	(Burkina Faso) USFA	2–0	1–3
TP Mazembe (Democratic Republic of the Congo)	2–0	(Central African Republic) Anges de Fatima	1–0	1–0
Hearts of Oak (Ghana)	4–6	(Republic of the Congo) Étoile du Congo	3–1	1–5
Fovu Club (Cameroon)	4–5	(Angola) Petro Atlético	2–2	2–3

^{1} The match was abandoned at 80' with Young Africans leading 2–0 and about to take a penalty, after local fans hurled plastic chairs onto the pitch and at the players and officials.

=== Second round ===
Team 1	Agg.	Team 2	1st leg	2nd leg
ASEC Mimosas (Ivory Coast)	2–2 (3–2 p)	(Senegal) ASC Diaraf	2–0	0–2
SC Villa (Uganda)	1–3	(Nigeria) Julius Berger	1–0	0–3
Al Ahly (Egypt)	6–0	(Seychelles) St.-Michel United	5–0	1–0
Tusker FC (Kenya)	2–2 (a)	(Tunisia) ES Tunis	2–1	0–1
Mamelodi Sundowns (South Africa)	6–5	(Tanzania) Young Africans	3–2	3–3
Al-Merrikh (Sudan)	2–3	(Algeria) CR Belouizdad	2–0	0–3
TP Mazembe (Democratic Republic of the Congo)	3–2	(Morocco) Raja Casablanca	2–0	1–2
Petro Atlético (Angola)	6–3	(Republic of the Congo) Étoile du Congo	4–1	2–2

== Group stage ==
Key to colours in group tables
Group winners and runners-up advance to the Knockout stage

=== Group A ===
Pos	Team	Pld	W	D	L	GF	GA	GD	Pts	Qualification	ESP	SUN	JUL	TPM
1	(Tunisia) ES Tunis	6	2	3	1	8	7	+1	9	Advance to knockout stage	—	0–0	3–2	2–1
2	(South Africa) Mamelodi Sundowns	6	2	3	1	2	2	0	9	Advance to knockout stage	0–0	—	1–0	1–0
3	(Nigeria) Julius Berger	6	2	1	3	6	6	0	7		1–1	2–0	—	1–0
4	(Democratic Republic of the Congo) TP Mazembe	6	2	1	3	5	6	−1	7		3–2	0–0	1–0	—

=== Group B ===
Pos	Team	Pld	W	D	L	GF	GA	GD	Pts	Qualification	PET	AHL	ASEC	BEL
1	(Angola) Petro Atlético	6	4	0	2	10	8	+2	12	Advance to knockout stage	—	1–3	0–1	2–1
2	(Egypt) Al Ahly	6	4	0	2	9	7	+2	12	Advance to knockout stage	2–4	—	2–1	1–0
3	(Ivory Coast) ASEC Mimosas	6	3	1	2	12	5	+7	10		1–2	1–0	—	7–0
4	(Algeria) CR Belouizdad	6	0	1	5	2	13	−11	1		0–1	0–1	1–1	—

== Knockout stage ==
=== Bracket ===
Semi-finals
(South Africa)	Mamelodi Sundowns (p)	2	0	2 (5)
(Angola)	Petro Atlético	0	2	2 (3)
(Egypt)	Al Ahly (a)	0	1	1
(Tunisia)	ES Tunis	0	1	1

Final
(South Africa)	Mamelodi Sundowns	1	0	1
(Egypt)	Al Ahly	1	3	4

=== Semifinals ===
Team 1	Agg.	Team 2	1st leg	2nd leg
Mamelodi Sundowns (South Africa)	2–2 (5–3 p)	(Angola) Petro Atlético	2–0	0–2
Al Ahly (Egypt)	1–1 (a)	(Tunisia) ES Tunis	0–0	1–1

=== Final ===
8 December 2001
--:-- UTC+2

Mamelodi Sundowns (South Africa)	1–1	(Egypt) Al Ahly
Kampamba 26'		Abdel Hafeez 58'

Loftus Versfeld Stadium, Pretoria
Attendance: 5,000
Referee: Coffi Codjia (Benin)
21 December 2001
--:-- UTC+2

Al Ahly (Egypt)	3–0	(South Africa) Mamelodi Sundowns
Bebo 37' (pen.), 45', 90'

Cairo International Stadium, Cairo
Attendance: 75,000
Referee: Abderrahim El Arjoun (Morocco)

== Top goalscorers ==
The top scorers from the 2001 CAF Champions League are as follows:

Rank	Name	Team	Goals
1	(Democratic Republic of the Congo) Kapela Mbiyavanga	(Angola) Petro Atlético	9
2	(Angola) Flávio	(Angola) Petro Atlético	7
3	(Egypt) Khaled Bebo	(Egypt) Al Ahly	6
4	(Angola) Avelino Lopes	(Angola) Petro Atlético	5
4	(Egypt) Alaa Ibrahim	(Egypt) Al Ahly	5
6	(Republic of the Congo) Patrick Lolo	(Republic of the Congo) Étoile du Congo	4
6	(Ghana) Emmanuel Osei Kuffour	(Ghana) Hearts of Oak	4
6	(Ivory Coast) Antonin Koutouan	(Ivory Coast) ASEC Mimosas	4
6	(Nigeria) Oluwasegun Abiodun	(Nigeria) Julius Berger	4
6	(Brazil) Adailton	(Tunisia) ES Tunis	4
6	(Brazil) Reinaldo	(Tunisia) ES Tunis	4
6	(Tunisia) Mourad Melki	(Tunisia) ES Tunis	4
