= Athletic Union of Greek Alexandria =

Egyptian sports club

- Sport: Football, basketball, volleyball, gymnastics, athletics, field hockey, and table tennis
- Founded: 1910; 116 years ago
- Location: Alexandria, Egypt
- Stadium: Greek Community Stadium
- Affiliation: Hellenic Athletics Federation

The Athletic Union of Greek Alexandria (AEEA) is a sports club serving the Greek community of Alexandria, Egypt. It was founded in 1910 with blue and white colors and a double-headed eagle emblem. Later, the Football Club of Greeks of Alexandria, also founded in 1910, was merged into the AEEA.

Over its history, the Association has had men's and women's football, men's and women's basketball, men's and women's volleyball, gymnastics, athletics, field hockey, and table tennis. The club competed at the Greek Community stadium in Alexandria. It is a regional member of the Hellenic Athletics Federation (SEGAS) in Egypt.

In July 1939 the Association started publishing a sports magazine entitled Athletiki Enosis, Bulletin of the Athletic Union of Greek Alexandria. It was published until at least 1975.

== Athletics ==
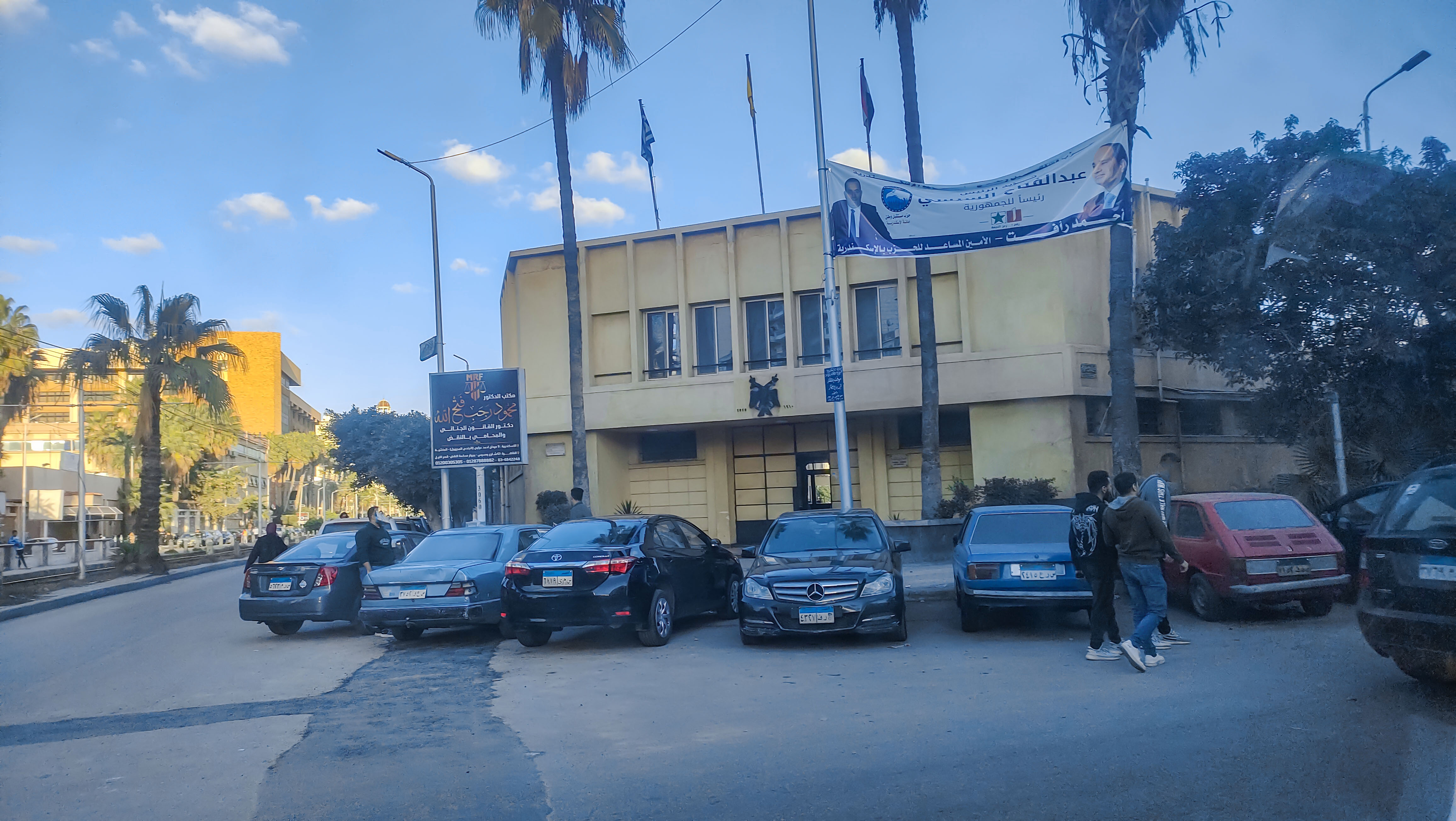
Gateway

In classical athletics the AEEA has participated in many national championships as well as in local championships of the SEGAS Egypt. Notable athletes include Nikolaou in the 60m, Gerolaimou in the long jump, discus and shot put, Alexandros Papafigos in the speed races, K. Varotsis in the jumps, A. Parodos also in jumping, Hatzikostas in shot put, Giannopoulos and Assouad in discus throwing, Koutlaki, Borz, Annie Shock, Suartz and Nikolaou in speedway, Maha in discus throwing[5], Vlastoudaki in javelin throwing who repeatedly broke the Pan-Egyptian record.

In 1955, the AEEA won the Egyptian inter-club championship with 69 points to National Cairo's 68, with 6 gold, 5 silver, and 7 bronze medals. All of the athletes were expatriates except for one Egyptian.

=== Football ===
The football department was struggling early in the local championship winning Alexandria many times the big league with the enemy "Juno Regkresion. At that time in Egypt were three local – regional championships: Cairo, Alexandria and Suez. The first bidding for the Egyptian league.

With the introduction of the League to Egypt AEEA played two years of the National D Egypt and has numerous appearances in the League. The first time in 1948–1949 finishing in ninth place with 17 points, 5 wins, 7 draws, eight defeats and finishes 20–30. And 1949–1950, occupying the 10th place with 14 points, 4 wins, six draws, eight defeats and ending 16–29.

After 1960, when the Greek community has shrunk, the football department at times participate in tournaments or local infrastructure of Alexandria.

=== Hockey ===
The field hockey part was founded in 1937 and was among the first groups to cultivate the sport to Egypt. The first league matches due to lack of English was by military groups and the group of "French Union, which disintegrated in the course and athletes joined the AEEA. By the end of World War II participated in Egyptian league leading role in many athletic events.

=== Table tennis ===
The table tennis section of AEEA had many athletes participating primarily in diaspora and the local leagues of Alexandria. The greatest athlete who was revealed Alekos Cassavetes, champion Egypt in 1948 and later Australia s when they migrated there. The Cassavetes had participated with the national team in world championship in 1939 at the Greek individual championship in 1950, where she lost the final by 3–0 Leventis and declared second panellinionikis. In the same event in terms of AEEA had taken part and: Vavakis, Andreadis. Also, see Psiakis were young Egyptian champion in 1959 and showed other ping ponistes.

The female section highlighted several major athletes. Among them were: Lite and coconut, which moved to Panathinaikos. The coconut had even grown champions Egypt in maidens (under 17) in 1965. Thalia also highlighted Kyriakou, girls champions Egypt and second in the girls 1967 and Kiki Karampella, homogeny champion league 1959.

== Sources ==
- "Athletic Echo" 6 April 1966, dedicated to Greek clubs in Egypt.
- "Sports Enosis", Bulletin of the Greek league Alexandria, v. 1 (03/07/1939).
- This article is the translation of el:Αθλητική Ένωση Ελλήνων Αλεξάνδρειας
