= 1949–50 Egyptian Premier League =

Tournament details
- Host country: Egypt
- Dates: October 1949
- Teams: 10

Final positions
- Champions: (Egypt) Al-Ahly (2nd title)
- Runners-up: (Egypt) Tersana
- Third place: (Egypt) Farouk Club
- Fourth place: (Egypt) Al-Ismaily

Tournament statistics
- Goals scored: 233
- Top scorer: (Egypt) El-Dhizui (13 goals)

The 1949–50 Egyptian Premier League started in October 1948. Al-Ahly were crowned champions for the second time in the club's history.

== Clubs ==
No.	Club
1	Al-Ahly
2	Tersana
3	Farouk Club
4	Ismaily
5	Ittihad
6	Port Fouad
7	Al-Masry
8	Al-Olympi
9	Al-Sekka Al-Hadid
10	Younan Alexandria

== Title Playoff ==
2 June 1950

Al Ahly	2–1	Tersana
Fathi Khattab; Toto		El-Samman (red card) 5'; Abdel Khair

Ahly	Tersana

== League table ==
Pos	Team	Pld	W	D	L	GF	GA	GD	Pts
1	Al-Ahly (C)	18	9	5	4	27	10	+17	23
2	Tersana	18	10	3	5	30	22	+8	23
3	Farouk Club	18	8	4	6	27	19	+8	20
4	Ismaily	18	7	4	7	26	28	−2	18
5	Ittihad	18	7	4	7	19	20	−1	18
6	Port Fouad	18	7	4	7	21	24	−3	18
7	Al-Masry	18	4	8	6	21	24	−3	16
8	Al-Olympi	18	6	4	8	25	29	−4	16
9	Al-Sekka Al-Hadid	18	4	6	8	18	25	−7	14
10	Younan	18	4	6	8	16	29	−13	10 (Note: 4 points deducted?)

Source: rsssf.com
(C) Champions

== Top goalscorers ==
Place	Player	Nationality	Club	Goals
1	El-Dhizui	Egypt	Al-Masry	12

== Al-Ahly Results ==
Team 1	Agg.	Team 2	1st leg	2nd leg
Al-Ahly (Egypt)	Vs.	(Egypt) Younan	2–0	0–0
Al-Ahly (Egypt)	Vs.	(Egypt) Farouk Club	2–0	0–0
Al-Ahly (Egypt)	Vs.	(Egypt) Tersana	4–1	0–3
Al-Ahly (Egypt)	Vs.	(Egypt) Olympic	5–0	2–0
Al-Ahly (Egypt)	Vs.	(Egypt) Al-Masry	4–1	0–2
Al-Ahly (Egypt)	Vs.	(Egypt) Ittihad	0–0	0–1
Al-Ahly (Egypt)	Vs.	(Egypt) Ismaily	1–2	2–0
Al-Ahly (Egypt)	Vs.	(Egypt) Al-Sekka Al-Hadid	2–0	1–0
Al-Ahly (Egypt)	Vs.	(Egypt) Port Fouad	2–0	0–0

Egyptian Premier League 1949-50 Winners
(Egypt)
Al-Ahly
Second title
