= Khaled Bebo =

Egyptian footballer (born 1976)

Personal information
- Date of birth: 6 October 1976 (age 50)
- Place of birth: Suez, Egypt
- Height: 1.82 m (6 ft 0 in)
- Position: Forward

Team information
- Current team: Al Ahly SC (Football director)

Youth career
- Suez

Senior career*
| Years | Team | Apps | (Gls) |
| 1995–1997 | Suez | | |
| 1997–2000 | Ismaily | | |
| 2000–2005 | Al Ahly | | |
| 2005–2006 | Al Masry | | |
| 2006–2008 | Petrojet | | |

International career
| 1998–2003 | Egypt | 19 | (2) |

Managerial career
- 2018–2019: Al Ahly SC (Director of Academies)
- 2019–2020: Al Ahly SC (Member of the Planning Committee)
- 2020–2023: Al Ahly SC (Head of Junior Section)
- 2023–: Al Ahly SC (Football director)
- * Club domestic league appearances and goals

Khaled Ali Mohamed El Amin (Arabic: خالد بيبو; born 6 October 1976), known as Khaled Bebo, is an Egyptian former professional footballer who played as a forward.

Bebo is mostly famous for scoring four goals in Cairo Derby against Zamalek in a game ended 6–1 on 16 May 2002. It is Zamalek's biggest derby loss since the commencement of the Egyptian league fixture in 1948. It is the first and only time in the history of the fixture that any player had achieved this feat.

He also scored three goals in the CAF Champions League 2001 2nd leg final against Mamelodi Sundowns in a game ended 3–0. Helping Al Ahly to win the competition.

== Personal life ==
Khaled is the father of Aarau winger Amr Khaled.

== Career statistics ==
Scores and results list Egypt's goal tally first:

| # | Date | Venue | Opponent | Score | Result | Competition |
|---|---|---|---|---|---|---|
| . | 4 January 2002 | Ismailia Stadium, Ismailia | Ghana | 1–0 | 2–0 | Friendly |
