= 1948–49 Egyptian Premier League =

Tournament details
- Host country: Egypt
- Dates: 22 October 1948
- Teams: 11

Final positions
- Champions: (Egypt) Al Ahly (1st title)
- Runners-up: (Egypt) Tersana
- Third place: (Egypt) Al-Ismaily
- Fourth place: (Egypt) Al-Masry

Tournament statistics
- Matches played: 220
- Goals scored: 310 (1.41 per match)
- Top scorer: (Egypt) Ad-Diba (15 goals) (Egypt) El-Dhizui (15 goals)

The 1948–49 Egyptian Premier League started on 22 October 1948. Al Ahly were crowned champions for the first time.

== Clubs ==
No.	Club
1	Al Ahly
2	Tersana
3	Ismaily
4	Al-Masry
5	Farouk Club
6	Ittihad
7	Al-Olympi
8	Al-Sekka Al-Hadid
9	Younan Alexandria
10	Teram
11	Port Fouad

== League table ==
Pos	Team	Pld	W	D	L	GF	GA	GD	Pts
1	Al Ahly (C)	20	13	3	4	48	21	+27	29
2	Tersana	20	10	5	5	30	22	+8	25
3	Ismaily	20	10	5	5	25	23	+2	25
4	Al-Masry	20	8	7	5	30	28	+2	23
5	Zamalek	20	9	5	6	26	22	+4	23
6	Ittihad	20	10	2	8	42	32	+10	22
7	Al-Olympi	20	6	7	7	24	29	−5	19
8	Al-Sekka Al-Hadid	20	7	4	9	32	36	−4	18
9	Younan	20	5	7	8	20	30	−10	17
10	Teram	20	2	6	12	20	34	−14	10
11	Port Fouad	20	3	3	14	13	33	−20	9

Source: rsssf.com
(C) Champions

== Top goalscorers ==
Place	Player	Nationality	Club	Goals
1	Mohamed Diab El-Attar "Diba"	Egypt	Al-Ittihad Al-Iskandary	15
-	El-Dhizui	Egypt	Al-Masry	15

== Al-Ahly Results ==
Team 1	Agg.	Team 2	1st leg	2nd leg
Al Ahly (Egypt)	Vs.	(Egypt) Younan	5–0	3–0
Al Ahly (Egypt)	Vs.	(Egypt) Zamalek	2–2	0–1
Al Ahly (Egypt)	Vs.	(Egypt) Tersana	2–2	1–1
Al Ahly (Egypt)	Vs.	(Egypt) Olympic	5–2	2–0
Al Ahly (Egypt)	Vs.	(Egypt) Al-Masry	3–0	3–1
Al Ahly (Egypt)	Vs.	(Egypt) Ittihad	1–2	1–0
Al Ahly (Egypt)	Vs.	(Egypt) Ismaily	2–0	1–2
Al Ahly (Egypt)	Vs.	(Egypt) Al-Sekka Al-Hadid	7–0	4–2
Al Ahly (Egypt)	Vs.	(Egypt) Teram	2–1	2–1
Al Ahly (Egypt)	Vs.	(Egypt) Port Fouad	2–1	2–0

Egyptian Premier League 1948-49 Winners
(Egypt)
Al Ahly
First title
