= Hossam El Badry =

Egyptian football manager (born 1960)

Personal information
- Full name: Hossam El Badry
- Date of birth: 23 March 1960 (age 66)
- Place of birth: Suez, Egypt
- Height: 1.75 m (5 ft 9 in)
- Position: Defender

Youth career
- 1970–1978: Al Ahly

Senior career*
| Years | Team | Apps | (Gls) |
| 1978–1987 | Al Ahly | | |

International career
| 1977–1980 | Egypt U21 | | |
| 1980–1985 | Egypt | | |

Managerial career
- 2001–2009: Al Ahly (assistant)
- 2009–2010: Al Ahly
- 2010–2011: Al-Merreikh
- 2011–2012: ENPPI
- 2012–2013: Al Ahly
- 2013: Al Ahli
- 2013–2015: Egypt U23
- 2016–2018: Al Ahly
- 2019–2021: Egypt
- 2022: ES Sétif
- 2023: CS Sfaxien
- 2023–2024: Al-Zawraa
- * Club domestic league appearances and goals

Hossam Mohamed El Badry (Arabic: حُسَام مُحَمَّد الْبَدْرِيّ; born 23 March 1960) is an Egyptian football coach and former player, currently managing Al-Zawraa.

== Career ==
El Badry played club football for Al Ahly. After he retired from playing, El Badry began coaching football beginning at his former club Al Ahly.

El Badry was appointed manager of the Egypt national football team in 2019. He led the team through a successful 2021 Africa Cup of Nations qualification campaign, but was replaced by Carlos Queiroz before the final tournament.

=== President of Pyramids FC ===
On 28 June 2018, Saudi billionaire Turki Al-Sheikh purchased Beni Suef based club Al Assyouti Sport and renamed the club to Pyramids FC. On the same day, he appointed Hossam Al Badry as the club’s chairman. Hossam defected from the club after it was taken over by Salem Al Shamsi and went on to coach the Egyptian national team until he was sacked in 2021 due to poor results.

== Honours and achievements ==
=== Player ===
Al Ahly

- Egyptian Premier League: 1978–79, 1980–81, 1981–82, 1984–85, 1985–86, 1986–87
- Egypt Cup: 1980–81, 1982–83, 1983–84, 1984–85
- African Cup of Champions Clubs: 1982, 1987
- African Cup Winners' Cup: 1984, 1985, 1986

=== Manager ===
Al Ahly

- Egyptian Premier League: 2009–10, 2016–17, 2017–18
- Egypt Cup: 2016–17
- Egyptian Super Cup: 2010, 2011, 2017
- CAF Champions League: 2012
- CAF Super Cup: 2013

Al-Merrikh

- Sudan Premier League: 2011
