= Ayman Shawky =

Egyptian association footballer (born 1962)

Personal information
- Full name: Ayman Shawky Mahmood Kunsowa
- Date of birth: December 9, 1962 (age 63)
- Place of birth: Egypt

Senior career*
Years	Team	Apps	(Gls)
1982-1984	El Koroum SC		
1984-1995	Al Ahly SC		
1995-1996	Zamalek SC		
1996-1997	El Koroum SC		

International career
1984-1990	Egypt		
- * Club domestic league appearances and goals

Ayman Shawky Kusowa (Arabic: أيمن شوقي), born on 9 December 1962, is a former Egyptian international striker who played most of his career with El-Ahly and a short spell with Zamalek SC.

He worked as a teacher and a coach at the King Abdullah Academy in Virginia, United States.

He participated in the 1990 World Cup in Italy.

== Clubs ==
- Koroum (Egypt)
- Ahly (Egypt)
- Zamalek (Egypt)
- Koroum (Egypt)

== Titles ==
Personal Titles

- Egyptian League Top Scorer (1983/84) with Koroum Club
- Scored 15 goals in African Club Cups (4th highest all-time record)

For Ahly

- 6 Egyptian League titles
- 5 Egyptian Cup titles
- 1 African Champions League title
- 3 African Cup Winners' Cup titles
- 1 Afro-Asian Cup titles

For Zamalek

- 1 African Champions League title
