= Gift Kampamba =

Zambian footballer (born 1979)

Personal information
- Full name: Gift Kampamba Muntanga
- Date of birth: January 1, 1979 (age 47)
- Place of birth: Kitwe, Zambia
- Height: 1.70 m (5 ft 7 in)
- Position: Midfielder

Senior career*
| Years | Team | Apps | (Gls) |
| 1999–2000 | Nkana | 40 | (15) |
| 2000–2001 | Mamelodi Sundowns | 63 | (9) |
| 2002 | IFK Hässleholm | | |
| 2002–2005 | Rostov | 44 | (2) |
| 2005 | City Pillars | | |
| 2005–2007 | Sabah FA | | |
| 2007–2008 | Nkana | | |
| 2008–2009 | Mpumalanga Black Aces | | |
| 2009–2010 | Green Buffaloes | | |

International career
| 1998–2005 | Zambia | 30 | (5) |
- * Club domestic league appearances and goals

Gift Kampamba (born January 1, 1979) is a Zambian former professional footballer who played as a midfielder.

== Honours ==
Rostov

- Russian Cup runner-up: 2003
