= Ahmed Salem =

Egyptian footballer (1898–1969)

Ahmed Mohamed Abdallah Salem
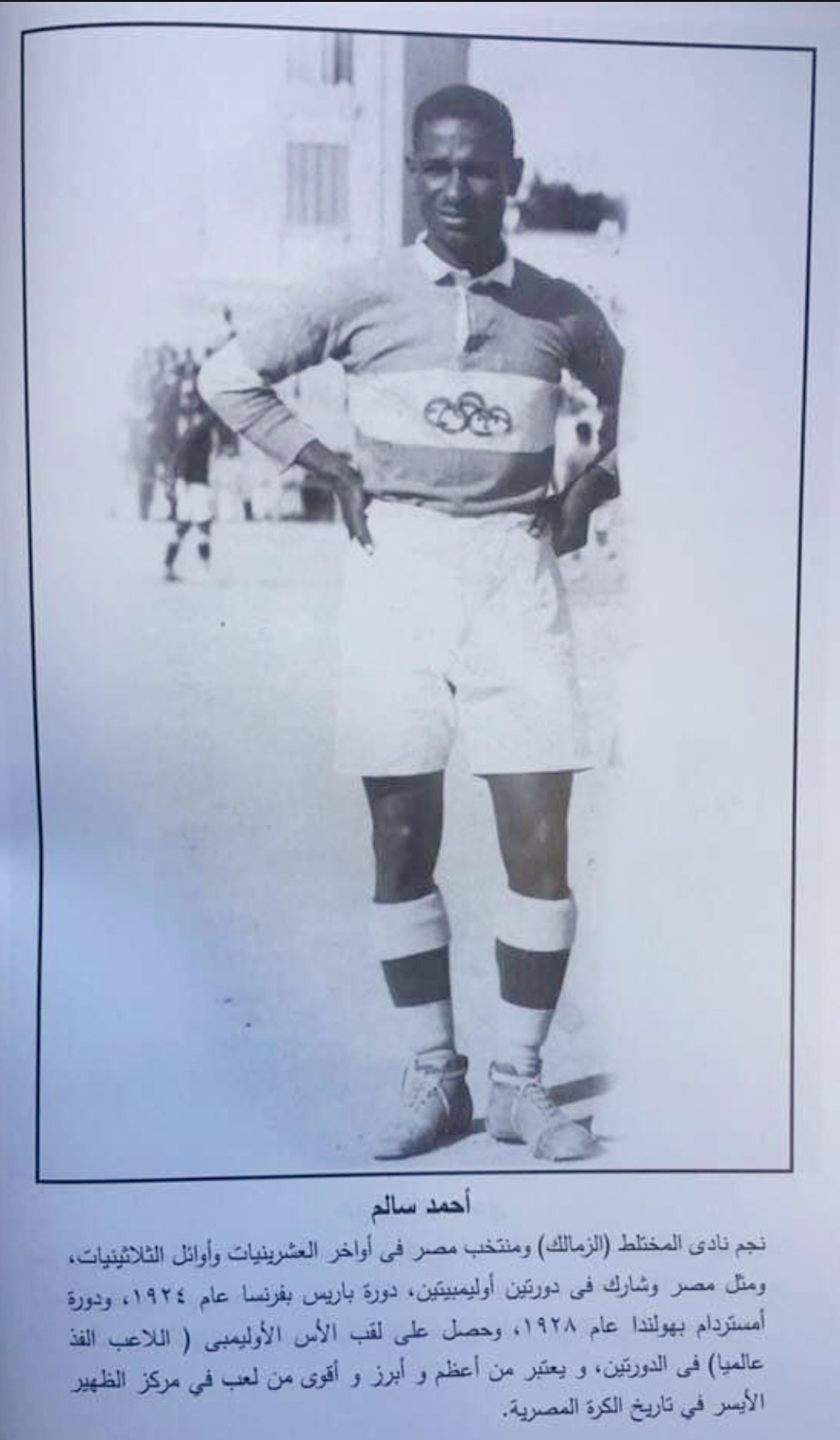
- Salem during the 1924 Olympics with Egypt

Personal information
- Full name: Ahmed Mohamed Salem
- Date of birth: 25 December 1898
- Place of birth: Damietta, Egypt
- Date of death: 28 October 1969 (aged 70)
- Place of death: Cairo, Egypt
- Position: Winger

Senior career*
Years	Team	Apps	(Gls)
1918–1926	Zamalek		
1926–1927	Olympic		
1927–1934	Zamalek		

International career
1921–1931	Egypt		
- * Club domestic league appearances and goals

Ahmed Mohamed Abdallah Salem was an Egyptian 2 time Olympian as a footballer and Track & Field Champion. He played for Zamalek and Egypt. He competed at the 1924 Summer Olympics and the 1928 Summer Olympics.

== Early life ==
Ahmed Mohamed Abdallah Salem was born on 25 December 1898, to Egyptian father Naval Colonel Mohamed Abdallah Salem and Egyptian mother (of Turkish descent) Adila Alhon.

Ahmed was born in Damietta because his father was stationed there at the time. His father typically rotated cities repeatedly in Egypt serving for the Egyptian Navy. Ahmed was the eldest of three boys. His two younger brothers were Mahmoud Salem (Captain of Railway Soccer Club) and youngest Abdel Monaem (Captain of Al Ahly Soccer Club).

Ahmed Salem graduated from the Egyptian Military College and entered the Egyptian Army. General Mohammed Haidar Pasha (Commander of Egyptian Army and Police) appointed Ahmed to transfer from an Army Officer to a Police Officer once General Haidar discovered Ahmed's passion for soccer and his exquisite skill. The General saw this rare and gifted talent from Ahmed and seized the opportunity to position him to play for the Egyptian National Team and clubs as a defender. This transfer would allow Ahmed flexibility for soccer training.

== Football career ==
Ahmed Salem joined Zamalek SC (an elite soccer club in Egypt that has many achievements amongst other Soccer clubs in the world) in 1923 and played only 1 season. During his time of play, the team won the Farouk Cup (recently titled Egypt Cup).

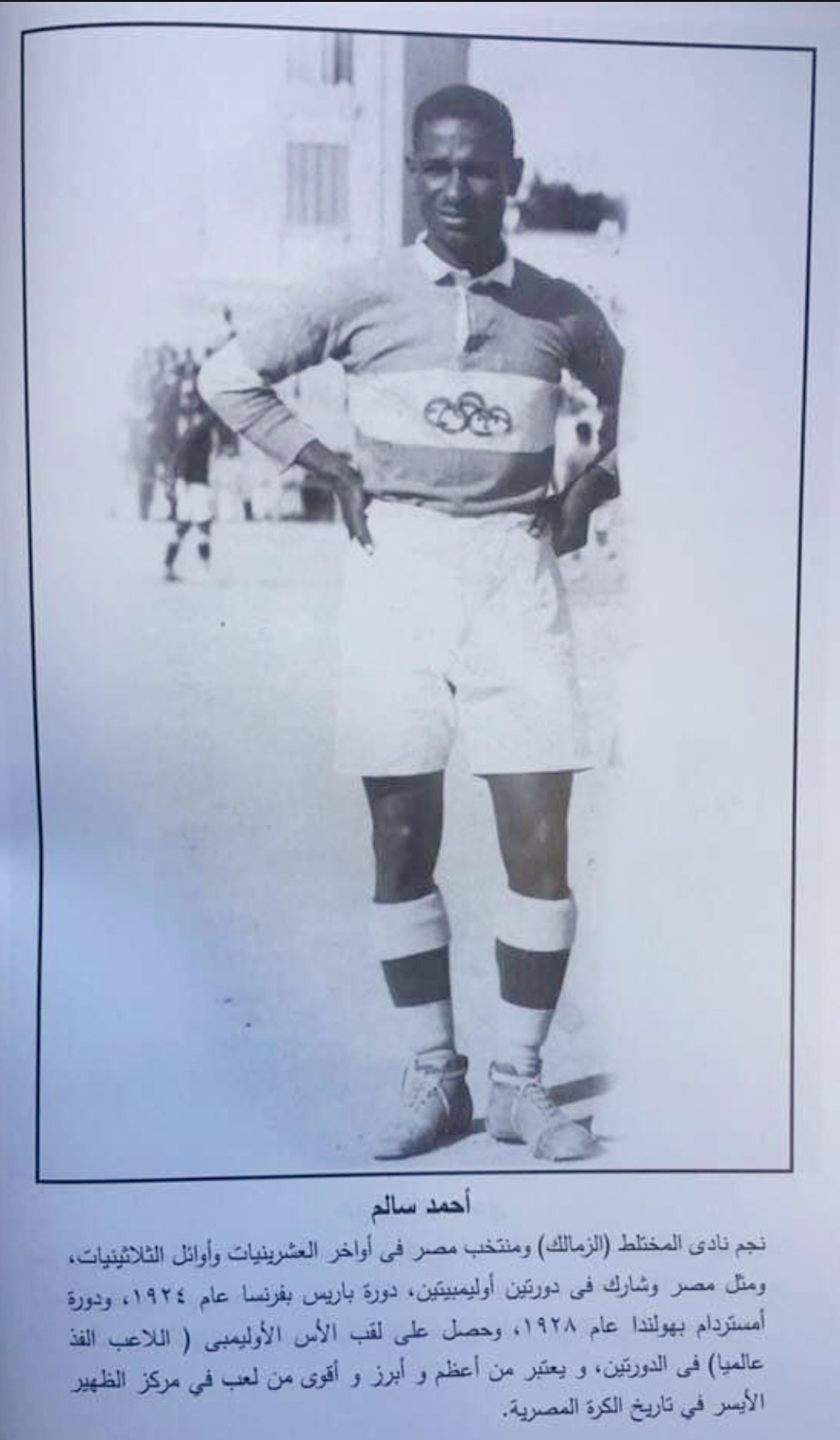
Zamalek's Ahmed Salem at 1924 Olympics in Paris, France

Ahmed Salem represented the Egyptian National Team in the Olympic games held in Paris, France in 1924 (Egypt at the 1924 Summer Olympics). He was chosen as the best left back (recently titled left full back) in the World. After the Olympics, Ahmed played for the Employees Club of Alexandria. In 1926, Prince Abbas Halim (cousin of Egyptian King Farouk I) renamed the Employees Club of Alexandria the Egyptian Olympic Ace Club. The name Olympic Ace derives from the name given to Ahmed Salem during the Olympic games in Paris. This was the first time in the world that a Soccer Club was renamed after a player's name. He played with the club until 1927.

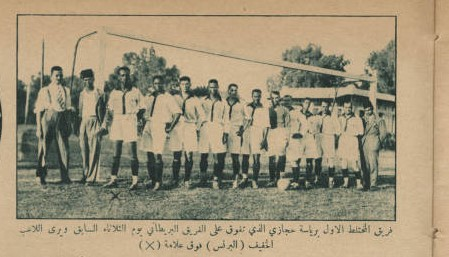
Salem (fourth from left) with Zamalek in 1928

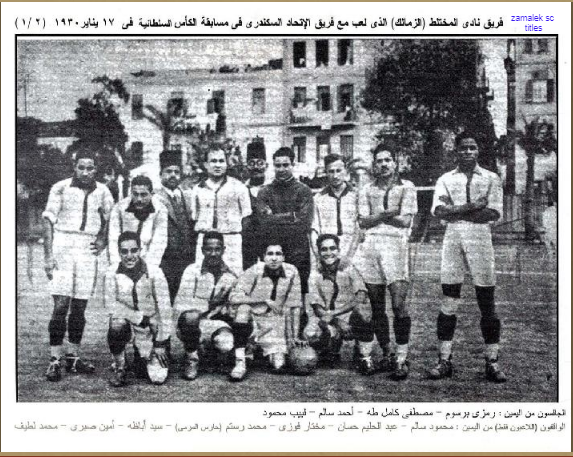
Salem (second sitting from left) with Zamalek in 1930

In 1927, he returned to Zamalek. In 1932, the team won the Egypt Cup after playing the Cairo derby against Al Ahly and winning the final by a score of 2-1, goals scored by Ismail Raafat and Said El-Hadary. Ahmed Salem personally received the Egyptian cup from the Egyptian Price Farouk (See photo). In 1928, Ahmed Salem once again represented the Egyptian National Team in the Olympic games held in Amsterdam, Netherlands. For the Soccer competition, he won as best defender for the Olympics. (Egypt at the 1928 Summer Olympics)

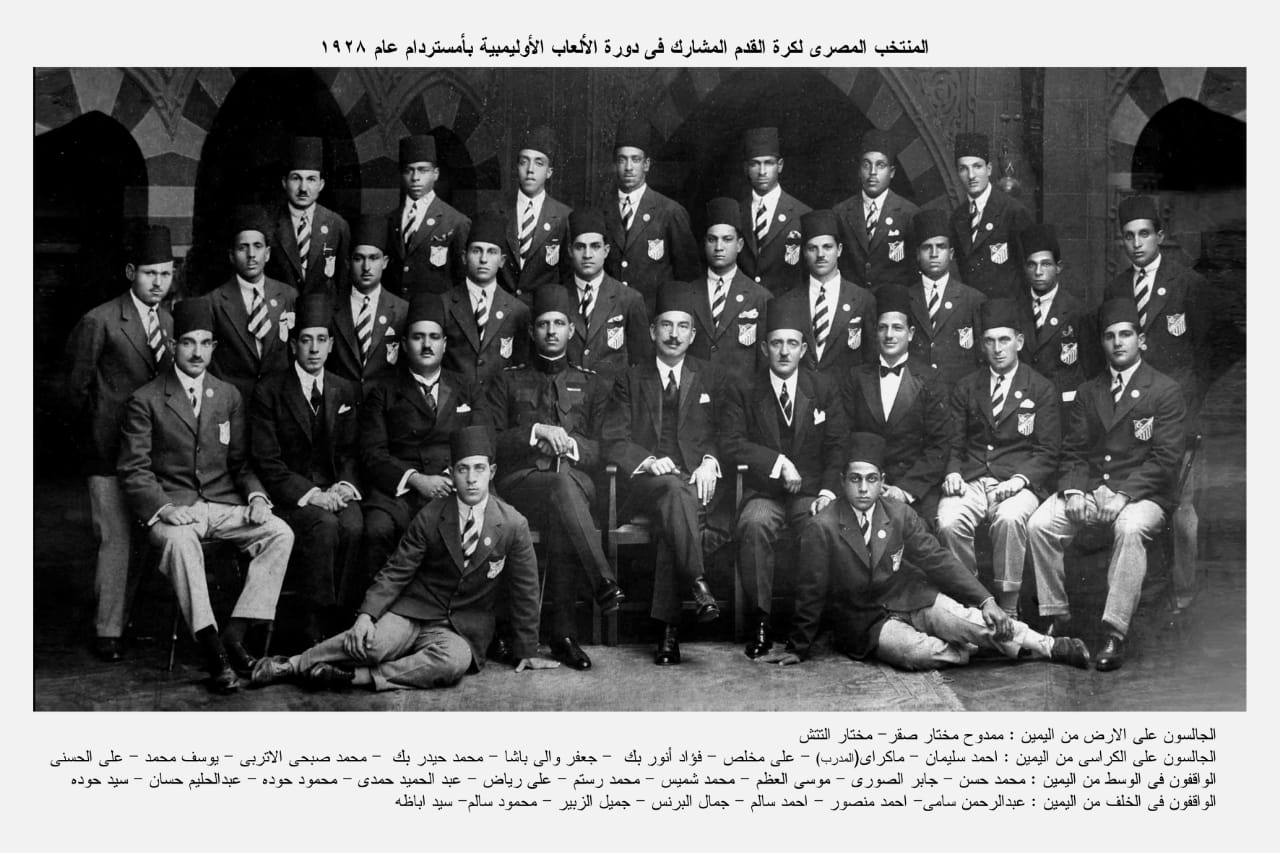
1928 Egyptian National Soccer Team participating in the Olympics held in Amsterdam

In 1930 and 1932, under the leadership of Ahmed Salem during his time at the Zamalek Club, they won the Cairo League (Esteemed leagues in Egypt) for several seasons. He was considered to be one of the best left back defender soccer players as well as the most prominent and strongest in Egyptian soccer history.

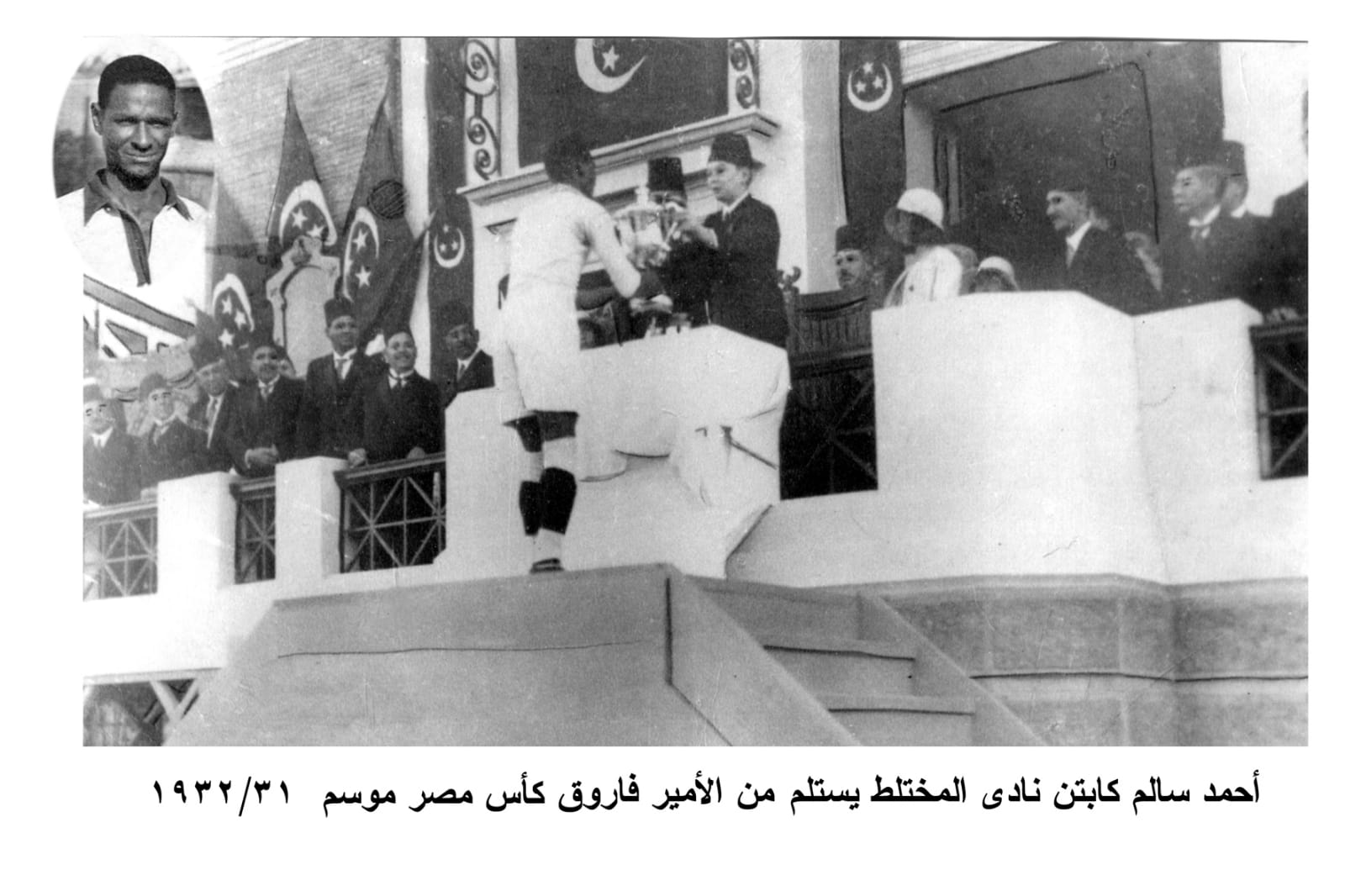
Ahmed Salem, Zamalek's captain receiving Egypt Cup trophy from Egyptian Prince Farouk in 1932

Ahmed Salem retired his Soccer career in 1934. Following that, in 1950, he established the Coast Guards Club (Hares el Hedoud) as a Coast Guard Officer and co-founder. He was the Football Manager for the Alexendria club, the Olympic Club.

In 1960, President of Egypt, Gamal Abdel Nasser awarded Ahmed Salem the honour to carry the Egyptian flag during the grand opening of the Cairo Stadium. He was chosen because he had the highest title in the history of Egyptian Soccer (Olympic Ace). In 1960-1964, Ahmed Salem was the Soccer Manager for the Railway Club of Alexandria. He concluded his military career with the rank of Prince Brigadier (now titled Brigadier General)

== Military career ==
During ceremonies and other royal engagements of King Farouk I's reign, Ahmed Salem was frequently appointed to guard and protect high ranking Egyptian rulers and nationals such as Prime Ministers Mostafa el-Nahas, Aly Maher and El Nokrashy Pasha, etc.

== Personal life ==
Ahmed Salem lived the rest of his life in Alexandria, Egypt with his two younger brothers. He married Fardous Yousef Atwa Bou Kortam (an Egyptian of Moroccan descent; her father was Moroccan) and they had nine children. From eldest, Major General Kamal Salem, Dr Adel Salem, Ansaf Salem, Wafaya "Fifi" Salem, Soad Salem, Samia Salem, Fawzia "Nanny" Salem, Brigadier General Farouk Salem and youngest son Ahmed "Hamada" Salem. Ahmed Salem's children eventually started their own families with some living in Alexandria, Egypt and others immigrating to the USA (Houston, Texas).

Ahmed Salem suffered a blood clot in his brain and died at the age of 71 at the Hospital Maadi Armed Forces in Cairo.

== Noted Relative ==
Ahmed Salem was the grandson of Lieutenant Colonel Abdallah Salem of the Egyptian Sudanese Army (Prior to Sudan's independence from Egypt in 1956).

In 1863, Napoleon III of France invited Maximilian, Archduke of Austria to become Emperor of Mexico. Maximilian accepted the offer and arrived in Mexico in 1864. Unfortunately the people of Mexico started a revolution against Maximilian. Napoleon III requested military assistance from Egypt's ruler Khedive Said Pasha. The Khedive sent a battalion headed by Brig-Gen Muhammad al-Mas Pasha and Assistant Commander was Lieutenant Colonel Abdallah Salem. The lead commander died quickly upon his arrival during the revolution and Lieutenant Colonel Abdallah Salem took command. Thanks to the Egyptian Battalion, they were successful in the revolution in 1867 and Lieutenant Colonel Abdallah Salem was awarded by Napoleon III the Legion of Honor, the highest military award in France.

Ahmed Salem was also the descendent of soldier Salem Poor. There is evidence that Salem Poor/Salem El Fakir/Salem El Fakih could be the same person. This is due to "El Fakir" in Arabic being translated to "Poor" in English. Additionally, the letter "r" and "h" looks very similar in Arabic font titled Rekaa. Over time, the names were used interchangeably not realizing they were the same person.

== Honours ==
=== Zamalek ===
- Sultan Hussein Cup: 1921, 1922
- Egypt Cup: 1922, 1932
- Cairo League: 1922–23, 1928–29, 1929–30, 1931–32, 1933–34
- King Fouad Cup: 1925, 1934

=== Egypt ===
- Summer Olympics fourth place: 1928
