= 1929–30 Egypt Cup =

Tournament details
- Country: Egypt

Final positions
- Champions: Al Ahly (5th title)
- Runner-up: Al Ittihad Alexandria

The 1929–30 Egypt Cup was the ninth edition of the Egypt Cup.

The final was held on 16 May 1930. The match was contested by Al Ahly and Al Ittihad Alexandria, with Al Ahly winning 2–0.

== Quarter-finals ==
Home team	Score	Away team
Olympic	1–2	Al Ahly
Al Masry	4–1	El Sekka El Hadid
Al Ittihad Alexandria	bye	
Tersana	bye	

== Semi-finals ==
Home team	Score	Away team
Al Ittihad Alexandria	5–2	Tersana
Al Masry	1–1	Al Ahly

== Final ==
16 May 1930

Al Ahly	2–0	Al Ittihad Alexandria
Hafez Kaseb; Mokhtar El Tetsh

Referee: Hussien Emam
