= 1930–31 Egypt Cup =

Tournament details
- Country: Egypt

Final positions
- Champions: Al Ahly (6th title)
- Runners-up: Zamalek

The 1930–31 Egypt Cup was the tenth edition of the Egypt Cup.

The final was held on 26 June 1931. The match was contested by Al Ahly and Zamalek, with Al Ahly winning 4–1. In that game, Mokhtar El Tetsh was the first player to score a hat trick in the Cairo Derby.

== Quarter-finals ==
Home team	Score	Away team
Zamalek	4–1	El Sekka El Hadid
Tersana		Al Ahly B
Al Ahly	3–0	El Sekka El Hadid Ismailia
Al Ittihad Alexandria	2–1	Olympic

== Semi-finals ==
Home team	Score	Away team
Al Ahly	3–2	Tersana
Zamalek	1–0	Al Ittihad Alexandria

== Final ==
26 June 1931

Al Ahly	4–1	Zamalek
Mostafa Taha 23'; Labib Mahmoud 24'; Mokhtar El Tetsh 65'; Mahmoud Mahran 86'		Ramzy Barsoum 70' (red card)

Referee: Mohamed El-Sayed
