= 1932–33 Egypt Cup =

Tournament details
- Country: Egypt

Final positions
- Champions: Olympic Club (1st title)
- Runners-up: Al Ahly

The 1931–32 Egypt Cup was the 12th edition of the Egypt Cup.

The final was held on 5 May 1933. The match was contested by Al Ahly and Olympic Club, with Olympic winning 4–1.

== Quarter-finals ==
Home team	Score	Away team
Zamalek	2–0	Ismaily
Olympic Club	3–0	Tersana
Al Ahly	4-2	Al Masry
Al Ittihad Alexandria	2–3	El Sekka El Hadid

== Semi-finals ==
Home team	Score	Away team
Al Ahly	3–1	Zamalek
El Sekka El Hadid	0–3	Olympic Club

== Final ==
5 May 1933

Al Ahly	1–3	Olympic Club
Amin Shoair 82'	Report	Gamal El-Prince 14'; Abdeen 17'; Hassan Ragab 20'
