= Ad-Diba =

Egyptian footballer and referee (1927–2016)

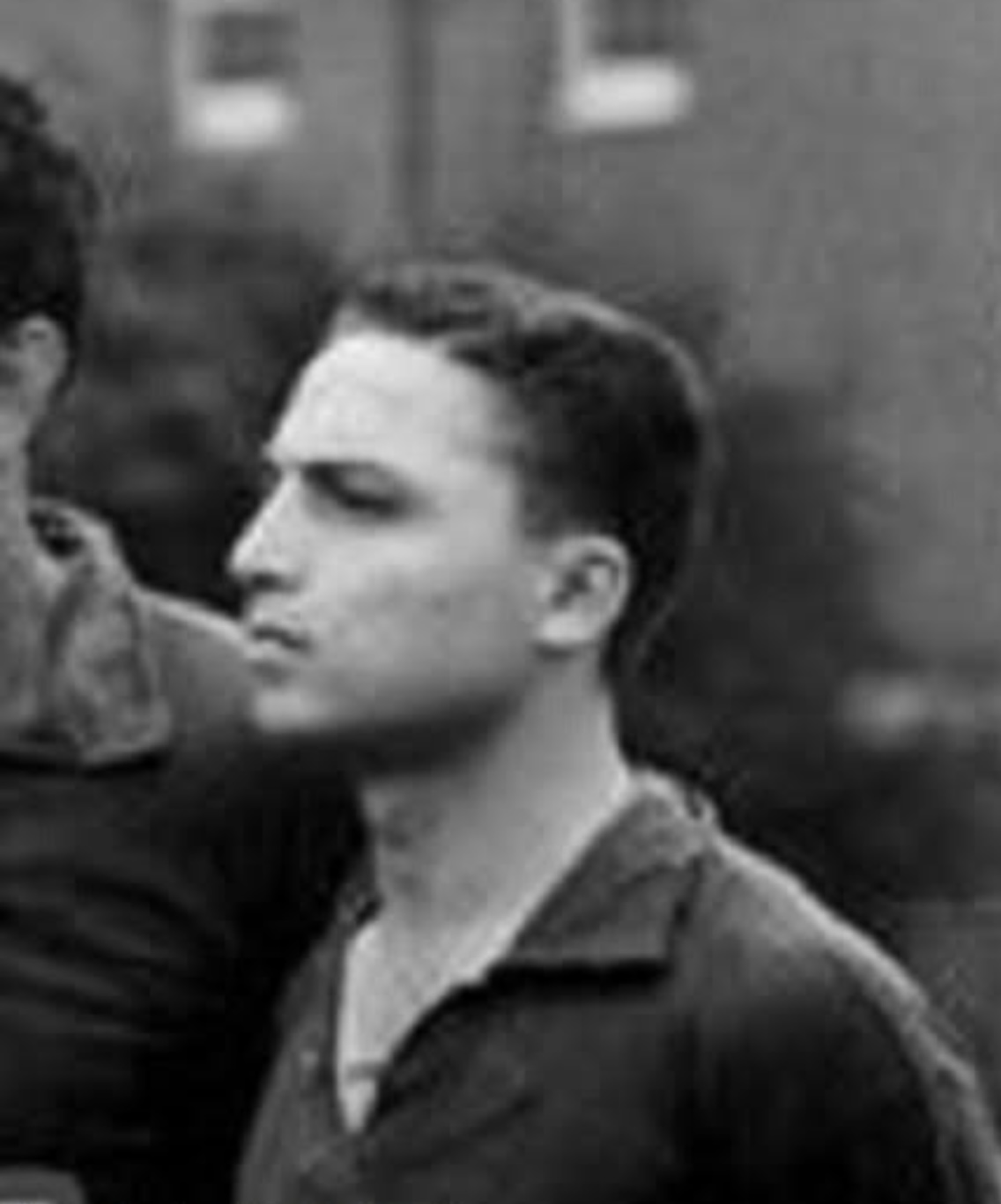
- Ad-Diba in 1948

Personal information
- Full name: Mohamed Diab Al-Attar
- Date of birth: 17 November 1927
- Place of birth: Alexandria, Egypt
- Date of death: 30 December 2016 (aged 89)
- Place of death: Alexandria, Egypt
- Position: Centre forward

Senior career*
Years	Team	Apps	(Gls)
1944–1958	Al Ittihad Alexandria Club	–	(81)

International career
1948–1957	Egypt	29	(22)
Medal record
Men's Football
Representing Egypt
Africa Cup of Nations
Winner	1957 Sudan
- * Club domestic league appearances and goals

Mohamed Diab Al-Attar (Arabic: مُحَمَّد دِيَاب الْعَطَّار; 17 November 1927 – 30 December 2016), known as Ad-Diba (Arabic: الدِّيبَة), was a footballer who played for the Al Ittihad Alexandria Club and the Egypt national football team. He later served as an international football referee. In 2007, he was named one of the 200 greatest African footballers.

== Biography ==
Ad-Diba was born in Alexandria and joined the Al Ittihad Alexandria Club as a centre forward in 1944. In 1948 he helped the team win the Egypt Cup and was the top scorer in the first Egyptian Premier League tournament (alongside El-Sayed El-Dhizui). He remained with the team until 1958, when they were relegated to the Egyptian Second Division, and retired to take up refereeing. Internationally, he was a member of the Egypt national football team and competed at two editions of the Summer Olympic Games in 1948 and 1952. He also helped Egypt win the first edition of both football at the Pan Arab Games in 1953 and the Africa Cup of Nations in 1957. In the latter case, he was the tournament's top scorer with five goals, four of which came in Egypt's 4–0 victory over Ethiopia in the final.

As a referee, Ad-Diab presided over the final of the 1968 African Cup of Nations and also refereed during the 2nd Arabian Gulf Cup and the 1976 Summer Olympics. By career he was a water manager and a journalist. In 2007, he was included in an initial list by the Confederation of African Football of the top 200 African footballers of all time. In September 2016 it was reported that he was suffering from Alzheimer's disease and in critical condition in an Alexandria hospital. He died on 30 December 2016 at the age of 89.

== Honours and achievements ==
=== Player ===
Al Ittihad

- Egypt Cup: 1948
- Alexandria Zone League: 1944–45, 1945–46, 1946–47, 1947–48, 1948–49, 1949–50, 1950–51, 1951–52, 1952–53

Egypt

- African Cup of Nations: 1957
- Arab Games: 1953

=== Individual ===
- Egyptian League top goalscorer: 1948–49
- Africa Cup of Nations top scorer: 1957
- Africa Cup of Nations Best Player: 1957, 1959
