= 1933–34 Egypt Cup =

Tournament details
- Country: Egypt

Final positions
- Champions: Olympic Club (2nd title)
- Runners-up: Zamalek

The 1932–33 Egypt Cup was the 13th edition of the Egypt Cup.

The final was held on 13 May 1934. The match was contested by Zamalek and Olympic Club, with Olympic winning 1–0.

== Quarter-finals ==
Home team	Score	Away team
Al Masry	4–2	Cairo Police
Zamalek	4–1	El Sekka El Hadid
Al Ahly	1-0	Al Ittihad Alexandria
Olympic Club	3–2	Tersana

== Semi-finals ==
Home team	Score	Away team
Zamalek	3–0	Al Ahly
Olympic Club	2–1	Al Masry

== Final ==
13 May 1934

Zamalek	0–1 (a.e.t.)	Olympic Club
	Report	Fetaiha Warda 134'
