= 1931–32 Egypt Cup =

Tournament details
- Country: Egypt

Final positions
- Champions: Zamalek (2nd title)
- Runners-up: Al Ahly

The 1931–32 Egypt Cup was the 11th edition of the Egypt Cup.

The final was held on 6 May 1932. The match was contested by Al Ahly and Zamalek, with Zamalek winning 2–1.

== Quarter-finals ==
Home team	Score	Away team
Al Ahly	6–0	Ismaily
Zamalek	9-0	El Minya
Olympic Club	3–1	Tersana
Al Ittihad Alexandria	1–0	El Sekka El Hadid

== Semi-finals ==
Home team	Score	Away team
Zamalek	2–0	Al Ittihad Alexandria
Al Ahly	5–1	Olympic Club

== Final ==
6 May 1932

Zamalek	2–1	Al Ahly
Ismail Rafaat 39'; Said El-Hadary 83'	Report	Amin Shoair 8'
