= 1936–37 Egypt Cup =

Tournament details
- Country: Egypt

Final positions
- Champions: Al Ahly (7th title)
- Runners-up: El Sekka El Hadid

The 1936–37 Egypt Cup was the 16th edition of the Egypt Cup.

The final was held on 11 June 1937. The match was contested by Al Ahly and El Sekka El Hadid, with Al Ahly winning 3–2.

== Quarter-finals ==
Team 1	Score	Team 2
Zamalek	1–1	Al Ahly
Olympic Club	1–2	El Sekka El Hadid
Al Masry	3–1	Tersana
Teram	0–1	Al Ittihad Alexandria

- Replays

Team 1	Score	Team 2
Zamalek	2–2	Al Ahly
Zamalek	0–5	Al Ahly

== Semi-finals ==
Team 1	Score	Team 2
El Sekka El Hadid	4–0	Al Ittihad Alexandria
Al Ahly	5–0	Al Masry

== Final ==
11 June 1937

Al Ahly	3–2	El Sekka El Hadid
Hamdi 20'; El-Sawwaf 23'; Abdel-Karim Sakr 87'	Report	Mourad 75'; Mansour 78'

Egypt Cup 1936-1937 Winners
Al Ahly
7th title
