= Mahmoud Mokhtar El Tetsh =

Egyptian footballer (1905-1965)

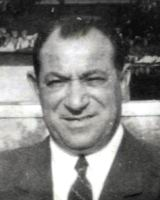

Personal information
- Full name: Mahmoud Mokhtar Refai
- Date of birth: 12 October 1905
- Place of birth: Cairo, Khedivate of Egypt
- Date of death: 21 February 1965 (aged 59)
- Place of death: Cairo, United Arab Republic
- Height: 1.72 m (5 ft 8 in)
- Position: Striker

Youth career
- Al Ahly

Senior career*
Years	Team	Apps	(Gls)
1922–1940	Al Ahly		

International career
1928–1936	Egypt	10	(9)

Managerial career
- Al Ahly
- * Club domestic league appearances and goals

Mahmoud Mokhtar Refai (Arabic: محمود مختار رفاعي; 12 October 1905 – 21 February 1965) was an Egyptian footballer. A prolific striker, he scored 9 goals in 10 international matches for Egypt. He represented Egypt at the 1924 Summer Olympics, 1928 Summer Olympics and the 1936 Summer Olympics.He is generally considered the best player in Africa in the 1920s and 1930s.

His nickname, "El Tetsh", was given to him by the High Commissioner in Egypt, George Lloyd, in reference to his skillful performance, likened to that of the contortionist.

== Career statistics ==
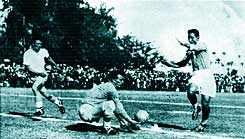
Israeli goalkeeper Willy Berger and defender Pinhas Fiddler trying to stop El-Tetsh from scoring a goal, 1934

=== International goals ===
#	Date	Venue	Opponent	Score	Result	Competition
1.	28 May 1928	Olympic Stadium, Amsterdam, Netherlands	Turkey	3–0	7–1	1928 Summer Olympics
2.	28 May 1928	Olympic Stadium, Amsterdam, Netherlands	Turkey	4–0	7–1	1928 Summer Olympics
3.	28 May 1928	Olympic Stadium, Amsterdam, Netherlands	Turkey	6–0	7–1	1928 Summer Olympics
4.	3 June 1928	Olympic Stadium, Amsterdam, Netherlands	Portugal	1–0	2–1	1928 Summer Olympics
5.	16 March 1934	British Army Ground, Cairo, Egypt	Mandatory Palestine	1–0	7–1	1934 FIFA World Cup qualification
6.	16 March 1934	British Army Ground, Cairo, Egypt	Mandatory Palestine	3–0	7–1	1934 FIFA World Cup qualification
7.	16 March 1934	British Army Ground, Cairo, Egypt	Mandatory Palestine	5–0	7–1	1934 FIFA World Cup qualification
8.	6 April 1934	Palms Stadium, Tel Aviv, Mandatory Palestine	Mandatory Palestine	2–0	4–1	1934 FIFA World Cup qualification
9.	6 April 1934	Palms Stadium, Tel Aviv, Mandatory Palestine	Mandatory Palestine	3–0	4–1	1934 FIFA World Cup qualification
Correct as of 27 December 2011

== Honours ==
=== Club ===
Al Ahly

- Egypt Cup: 1923–24, 1924–25, 1926–27, 1927–28, 1929–30, 1930–31, 1936–37, 1939–40
- Sultan Hussein Cup: 1922–23, 1924–25, 1925–26, 1926–27, 1928–29, 1930–31, 1937–38
- Cairo League: 1924–25, 1926–27, 1927–28, 1928–29, 1930–31, 1934–35, 1935–36, 1936–37, 1937–38, 1938–39

=== International ===
Egypt

- Summer Olympics: fourth place 1928

== See also ==
- Mokhtar El-Tetsh Stadium
- Saleh Selim
