= Ahmed Sary =

Egyptian footballer and manager (born 1968)

Personal information
- Full name: Ahmed Sary
- Date of birth: August 20, 1968 (age 58)
- Place of birth: Alexandria, Egypt
- Height: 1.80 m (5 ft 11 in)
- Position: Forward

Youth career
- Al Ittihad Al Sakandary

Senior career*
Years	Team	Apps	(Gls)
1990 – 2001	Al Ittihad Al Sakandary		
2001–2002	El-Olympi		

International career
1994–2002	Egypt	12	(5)

Managerial career
- 2006–2009: Yemen (assistant)
- 2010: Al Nile
- 2011: Amal Atbara
- 2012–2014: Al Ittihad Al Sakandary
- 2017–2018: Al-Adalah FC
- 2024–: Al Ittihad Al Sakandary
- * Club domestic league appearances and goals

Ahmed Sary (Arabic أحمد ساري); (born August 20, 1968), is an Egyptian former football striker. He was the top scorer of Egyptian Premier League (1994–95) with 10 goals playing for Al Ittihad Al Sakandary. He is currently a manager for Al Ittihad Al Sakandary after short spills in Yemen and Sudan.

== International career ==
Sary made some appearances for the Egypt national football team, including 1998 FIFA World Cup qualifying matches.

== Career statistics ==
=== International ===
Appearances and goals by national team and year
National team	Year	Apps	Goals
Egypt	1994	1	1
Egypt	1995	7	2
Egypt	1996	1	1
Egypt	1997	2	1
Egypt	1998	–	
Egypt	1999	–	
Egypt	2000	–	
Egypt	2001	–	
Egypt	2002	1	0
Total		12	5

Scores and results list Egypt's goal tally first, score column indicates score after each Sary goal.

List of international goals scored by Ahmed Sary
No.	Date	Venue	Opponent	Score	Result	Competition
1	11 November 1994	Cairo International Stadium, Cairo, Egypt	Ethiopia	2–0	5–0	1996 Africa Cup of Nations qualification
2	30 July 1995	Alexandria Stadium, Alexandria, Egypt	Uganda	2–0	6–0	1996 Africa Cup of Nations qualification
3	30 July 1995	Alexandria Stadium, Alexandria, Egypt	Uganda	4–0	6–0	1996 Africa Cup of Nations qualification
4	26 May 1996	Accra Sports Stadium, Accra, Ghana	Ghana	1–0	2–0	Friendly
5	5 January 1997	Alexandria Stadium, Alexandria, Egypt	Belarus	2–0	2–0	Friendly

== Titles and honours ==
- Top scorer in Egyptian Premier League (1994–95) with 10 goals.
