= Alexandria Zone League =

Alexandria League
- Founded: 1927
- Folded: 1953
- Country: Egypt
- Number of clubs: 5
- Level on pyramid: 1
- Domestic cup: Egypt Cup
- Last champions: El Ittihad Alexandria (1952–53)
- Most championships: El Ittihad Alexandria (27 titles)

Alexandria League 1924–1953 & 1952–53, is an old Egyptian football tournament. Before the start of Egyptian Premier League in its current form, the main competition was the Egypt Cup which started 1921. Egyptian federation started its 1st league competition (1938) in the form of regional leagues (Cairo, Alexandria, Bahary & Canal). The competition was played along with the new league form (1948–1953) then finally stopped. Five teams participated in this league El Ittihad Alexandria, El-Olympi, Teram & other clubs.

== Honours ==
The past Winners are:

Season	Winner
1926–27	El Ittihad Alexandria
1927–28	El Ittihad Alexandria
1928–29	El Ittihad Alexandria
1929–30	El Ittihad Alexandria
1930–31	El Ittihad Alexandria
1931–32	El Ittihad Alexandria
1932–33	El Ittihad Alexandria
1933–34	El Ittihad Alexandria
1934–35	El Ittihad Alexandria
1935–36	El Ittihad Alexandria
1936–37	El Ittihad Alexandria
1937–38	El Ittihad Alexandria
1938–39	El Ittihad Alexandria
1939–40	El Ittihad Alexandria
1940–41	El Ittihad Alexandria
1941–42	El Ittihad Alexandria
1942–43	El Ittihad Alexandria
1943–44	El Ittihad Alexandria
1944–45	El Ittihad Alexandria
1945–46	El Ittihad Alexandria
1946–47	El Ittihad Alexandria
1947–48	El Ittihad Alexandria
1948–49	El Ittihad Alexandria
1949–50	El Ittihad Alexandria
1950–51	El Ittihad Alexandria
1951–52	El Ittihad Alexandria
1952–53	El Ittihad Alexandria

== Performances ==
Team	Titles
El Ittihad Alexandria	27
El-Olympi	0
Teram	0
