= 1935–36 Egypt Cup =

Tournament details
- Country: Egypt

Final positions
- Champions: Al Ittihad Alexandria (2nd title)
- Runners-up: El Sekka El Hadid

The 1935–36 Egypt Cup was the 15th edition of the Egypt Cup.

The final was held on 10 April 1936. The match was contested by Al Ittihad Alexandria and El Sekka El Hadid, with Al Ittihad winning 3–1.

== Quarter-finals ==
Team 1	Score	Team 2
Zamalek	2–1	Olympic Club
Al Masry	0–1	El Sekka El Hadid
Al Ittihad Alexandria	3–1	Tersana
Teram	0–1	Al Ahly

== Semi-finals ==
Team 1	Score	Team 2
Zamalek	0–1	El Sekka El Hadid
Al Ittihad Alexandria	4–1	Al Ahly

== Final ==
10 April 1936

Al Ittihad Alexandria	3–1	El Sekka El Hadid
Houda ?', ?'; Abdou Helmi ?'	Report	Mansour ?'

Egypt Cup 1935-1936 Winners
Al Ittihad Alexandria
2nd title
