= Ismail Rafaat =

Egyptian footballer (1912-2004)

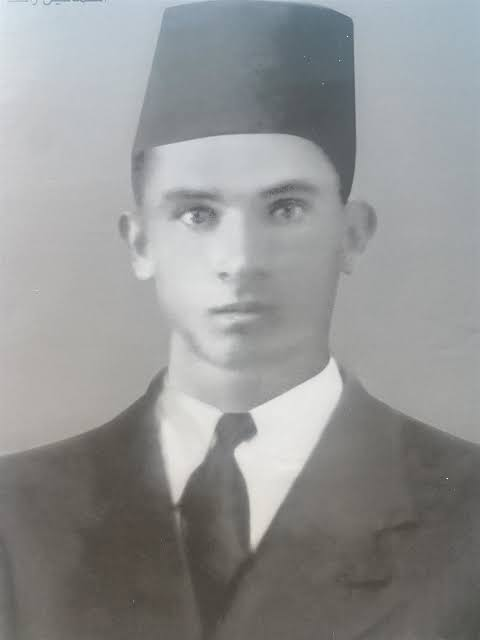
- Ismail Raafat in 1932

Personal information
- Date of birth: 3 January 1912
- Place of birth: Egypt
- Date of death: 2004 (aged 92)
- Position: Midfielder

Senior career*
Years	Team	Apps	(Gls)
1929-1930	El Sekka El Hadid SC		
1930-1932	Zamalek SC		
1932-1933	Tersana SC		
1933-1934	Zamalek SC		
1934-1935	Red Star F.C.		
1935-1937	FC Sochaux-Montbéliard		
1937-1939	FC Sète 34		
1939-1940	El Tram Sports Club		

International career
- Egypt
- * Club domestic league appearances and goals

Ismail Rafaat (Arabic: إِسْمَاعِيل رَأْفَت; 3 January 1912 – 2004) was an Egyptian football midfielder who played for Egypt in the 1934 FIFA World Cup. He also played for Zamalek SC.

== Honours ==
Zamalek

- Egypt Cup: 1932
- Cairo League: 1931–32, 1933–34
- King Fouad Cup: 1934

FC Sochaux-Montbéliard

- Ligue 1: 1937–38
