= Egypt Cup =

Association football tournament

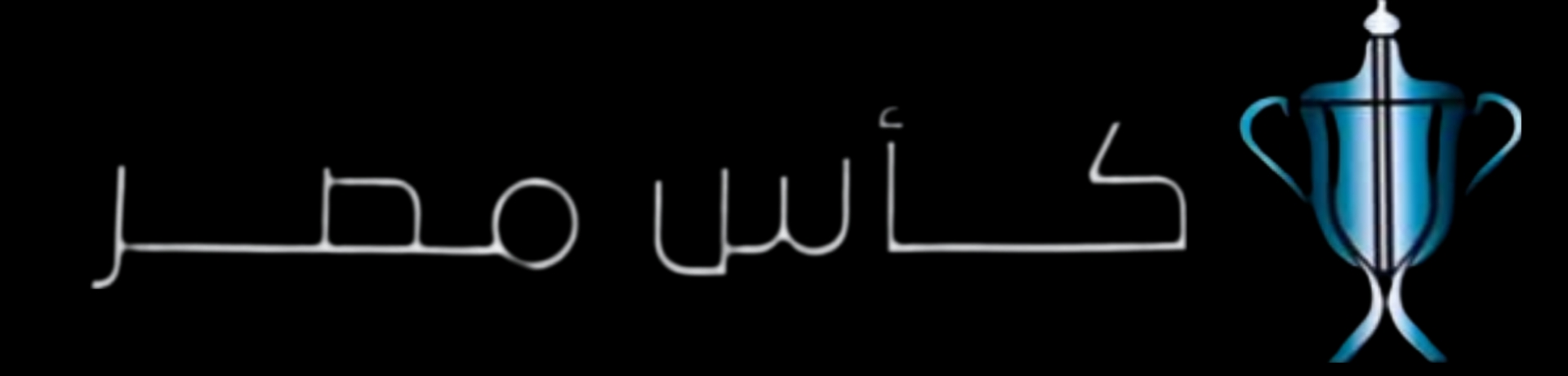
- Organiser(s): Egyptian Football Association (EFA)
- Founded: 1921
- Region: Egypt
- Qualifier for: CAF Confederation Cup
- Domestic cup: Super Cup
- Current champions: Pyramids (2nd title)
- Most championships: Al Ahly (39 titles)
- 2026–27 Egypt Cup

The Egypt Cup is the main knockout football cup competition in Egypt. It is the oldest club competition in Africa. It is organized by the Egyptian Football Association (EFA). The Egypt Cup is considered the oldest club football competition in Africa that is still held today.

Zamalek is the first team to win the title in 1922. Al Ahly hold the record of total number of titles with a total of 39 titles, Zamalek also holds the distinction of being the only club to have won the Egypt Cup four consecutive times on two separate occasions, from 1957 to 1960 and from 2013 to 2016.

== History ==
The Egypt Cup is the oldest tournament in the history of Egyptian football that is still being held to-date, and it is the first competition to be organized by the Egyptian Football Association. However, it is not the first football tournament to be held in the country. The first local football tournament in Egypt was the Sultan Hussein Cup. It was launched in 1917, and its last edition was held in the 1937–38 season. The Sultan Hussein Cup witnessed the participation of Egyptian clubs with clubs belonging to the British army, which was present in Egypt at the time. With the establishment of the Egyptian Football Association in 1921, the need arose to launch a tournament with only Egyptian clubs participating, and from this time the Egypt Cup tournament emerged with the participation of Zamalek, Al Ahly, Tersana, Olympic, Schools team, Railway, Al-Abbasiya, Al Ittihad, Al-Haditha, and the Nile.

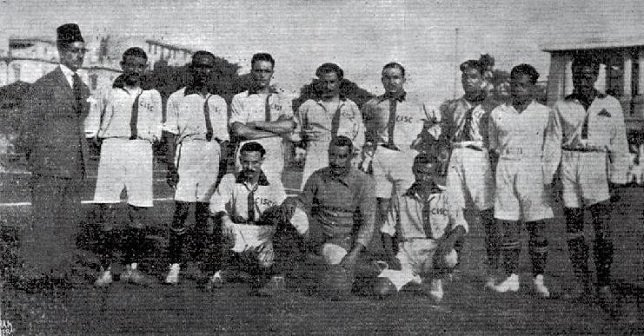
The Zamalek squad, winners of the first edition in 1922

Zamalek achieved the title of the first edition of the Egypt Cup, after defeating Al Ittihad; 5–0 in the 1922 final match. Tersana won the second edition in 1923, followed by Al Ahly in 1924. The first Cairo derby between Zamalek and Al Ahly to be played in the final was in the 1928 edition which Al Ahly won by a score of 1–0, winning goal scored by Mamdouh Sakr. The 1930–31 edition saw Al Ahly winning Zamalek in the final by a score of 4–1. The next year in the 1932 final between Zamalek and Al Ahly, Zamalek retaliated and defeated Al Ahly by a score of 2–1, winners goals were scored by Ismail Raafat, Said El-Hadary and Amin Shoeir scored for Al Ahly. In the 1934–35 edition, the final was held on 10 May 1935. The match was again contested by Zamalek and Al Ahly, with Zamalek winning by a score of 3–0, goals were scored by Helmy Zamora, El-Samkary and Marei.

The biggest win in the 1944 final match between the Cairo giants; Zamalek and Al Ahly with a 6–0 win for Zamalek, goals scored by Zoklot (hat-trick), Mohsen El-Sehaimi (2 goals) and Abdel-Karim Sakr. This was the second Cairo Derby in two years to end with a 6–0 win for Zamalek after the 1941–42 Cairo League match. After this huge score for Zamalek, Al Ahly won three consecutive titles in (1945, 1946, 1947), however, they didn't meet Zamalek in the final.

Zamalek dominated the 1950s, as the Cairo giants won seven titles between the years of 1952 to 1962, starting from 1952, 1955, followed by four consecutive titles in (1957, 1958 (title shared with Al Ahly), 1959, 1960) and finally in 1962. In 1958, and 1959, Zamalek claimed their title from Al Ahly, who won the 1961 title after winning El Qanah 5–0 in the final, the next year, Zamalek also claimed their title by winning Al Ittihad by a score of 5–1 in the final. From 1962 to 1976, Zamalek and Al Ahly only won one title each, as El Qanah, Tersana and Al Ittihad dominated this era. However, Zamalek won the 1975, 1977, and 1979 titles, with Al Ahly claiming their title from their rivals in the 1978 final. In the early 1980s, Al Ahly dominated the championship, they won the 1981, 1983, 1984 and 1985. Followed by the final and sixth title for Tersana in 1986, before Zamalek winning their 18th title in the 1988 edition after nine years from their last title.

In the 1990s, the tournament saw the Cairo derby in the final for the first time in 14 years, after Al Ahly won Zamalek by a score of 2–1 in the 1992 final. This decade saw new champions, as Ismaily won their first title in the 1997 edition after defeating Al Ahly by a score of 1–0 in the final, followed by Al Masry in 1998 after defeating Al Mokawloon in the final.

Despite its launch more than 100 years ago, the Egypt Cup has witnessed the holding of 90 editions so far, and has been canceled on more than one occasion. The tournament was canceled in the 1942–43 season, after players from Zamalek and Al-Ahly (the final belligerents) were suspended after their travel to Palestine, and opposition to the Football Association’s decision in this regard. The tournament was not played between 1967 and 1971 due to the War of Attrition, and it was canceled in the 1973–74 season due to the October War. For several other reasons, the tournament was canceled in 1979–80, 1986–87 and 1993–94 seasons, and was canceled in the 1981–82 edition due to Zamalek’s dispute with the Football Association. The cup was also canceled in the 2011–12 season after the Port Said Stadium riot in the league match between Al-Masry and Al-Ahly.

== List of finals ==
The following table provides a summary of seasons:

No.	Season	Winner	Score	Runner-up
1	1921–22	Zamalek (1)	5–0	Ittihad Alexandria
2	1922–23	Tersana (1)	1–0	El Sekka El Hadid SC
3	1923–24	Al Ahly (1)	0–0 / 4–1 (R)	El Sekka El Hadid SC
4	1924–25	Al Ahly (2)	1–1 / 3–0 (R)	Ittihad Alexandria
5	1925–26	Ittihad Alexandria (1)	2–2 / 3–2 (R)	Al Ahly
6	1926–27	Al Ahly (3)	5–0	Al-Masry
7	1927–28	Al Ahly (4)	1–0	Zamalek
8	1928–29	Tersana (2)	2–2 (aet) 1–0 (R)	Ittihad Alexandria
9	1929–30	Al Ahly (5)	2–0	Ittihad Alexandria
10	1930–31	Al Ahly (6)	4–1	Zamalek
11	1931–32	Zamalek (2)	2–1	Al Ahly
12	1932–33	El Olympi (1)	3–1	Al Ahly
13	1933–34	El Olympi (2)	1–0 (aet)	Zamalek
14	1934–35	Zamalek (3)	3–0	Al Ahly
15	1935–36	Ittihad Alexandria (2)	3–1	El Sekka El Hadid SC
16	1936–37	Al Ahly (7)	3–2	El Sekka El Hadid SC
17	1937–38	Zamalek (4)	1–1 (aet) 1–0 (R)	Al Ahly
18	1938–39	Al Teram (1)	1–1 (aet) 2–0 (R)	Cairo Police
19	1939–40	Al Ahly (8)	3–1	Al Teram
20	1940–41	Zamalek (5)	5–0	Cairo Police
21	1941–42	Al Ahly (9)	3–0	Zamalek
22	1942–43	Al Ahly (10); Zamalek (6)	Not played (TS) ‡	—
23	1943–44	Zamalek (7)	6–0	Al Ahly
24	1944–45	Al Ahly (11)	3–2	Al-Masry
25	1945–46	Al Ahly (12)	3–0	El Sekka El Hadid SC
26	1946–47	Al Ahly (13)	2–1	Al-Masry
27	1947–48	El Ittihad El Sakandary (3)	2–1	Zamalek
28	1948–49	Al Ahly (14)	3–1 (aet)	Zamalek
29	1949–50	Al Ahly (15)	6–0	Tersana
30	1950–51	Al Ahly (16)	1–0	El Sekka El Hadid SC
31	1951–52	Zamalek (8)	2–0	Al Ahly
32	1952–53	Al Ahly (17)	4–1	Zamalek
33	1953–54	Tersana (3)	4–1	Al-Masry
34	1954–55	Zamalek (9)	2–1	Ittihad Alexandria
35	1955–56	Al Ahly (18)	1–0	Tersana
36	1956–57	Zamalek (10)	3–0	Al-Masry
37	1957–58	Al Ahly (19); Zamalek (11)	0–0 (aet) 2–2 (aet) (R) (TS) ‡	—
38	1958–59	Zamalek (12)	2–1	Al Ahly
39	1959–60	Zamalek (13)	3–2	El Olympi
40	1960–61	Al Ahly (20)†	5–0	El Qanah †
41	1961–62	Zamalek (14)	5–1	Ittihad Alexandria
42	1962–63	El Ittihad El Sakandary (4)	3–2	Zamalek
43	1963–64	El Qanah (1)	2–0	El Sekka El Hadid SC
44	1964–65	Tersana (4)	4–1	Suez El-Riyadi
45	1965–66	Al Ahly (21)	1–0	Tersana
46	1966–67	Tersana (5)	1–0	El Olympi
—	1967–1972	Not played due to the Six-Day War.		
47	1972–73	El Ittihad El Sakandary (5)	0–0 (aet) 2–1 (R)	Al Ahly
—	1973–74	Not played due to the Yom Kippur War.		
48	1974–75	Zamalek (15)	1–0	Ghazl El Mahalla
49	1975–76	El Ittihad El Sakandary (6)	1–0	Al Ahly
50	1976–77	Zamalek (16)	3–1	Ismaily
51	1977–78	Al Ahly (22)	4–2	Zamalek SC
52	1978–79	Zamalek (17)	3–0	Ghazl El Mahalla
—	1979–80	Not played due to a very late finish of 1979–80 Egyptian Premier League.		
53	1980–81	Al Ahly (23)	1–1 (3–2 p)	El Mokawloon
—	1981–82	Not Finished due to a conflict between Zamalek and EFA.		
54	1982–83	Al Ahly (24)	1–0	Al-Masry
55	1983–84	Al Ahly (25)	3–1 (aet)	Al-Masry
56	1984–85	Al Ahly (26)	1–0	Ismaily
57	1985–86	Tersana (6)	3–2	Ghazl El Mahalla
—	1986–87	Not played due to a very tight schedule because of African commitments by National Team, Al Ahly, Zamalek and Tersana.		
58	1987–88	Zamalek (18)	1–0	Ittihad Alexandria
59	1988–89	Al Ahly (27)	3–0	Al-Masry
60	1989–90	El Mokawloon (1)	2–1	Suez Montakhab
61	1990–91	Al Ahly (28)	1–0	Aswan SC
62	1991–92	Al Ahly (29)	2–1	Zamalek
63	1992–93	Al Ahly (30)	3–2	Ghazl El Mahalla
—	1993–94	Not Finished due to late finish of the Egyptian League and start of 1994 FIFA World Cup.		
64	1994–95	El Mokawloon (2)	2–0	Ghazl El Mahalla
65	1995–96	Al Ahly (31)	3–1	El Mansoura
66	1996–97	Ismaily (1)	1–0	Al Ahly
67	1997–98	Al Masry (1)	4–3	El Mokawloon
68	1998–99	Zamalek (19)	3–1	Ismaily
69	1999–2000	Ismaily (2)	4–0	El Mokawloon
70	2000–01	Al Ahly (32)	2–0 (aet)	Ghazl El Mahalla
71	2001–02	Zamalek (20)	1–0	Baladeyet El Mahalla
72	2002–03	Al Ahly (33)	1–1 (4–3 p)	Ismaily
73	2003–04	El Mokawloon (3)	2–1	Al Ahly
74	2004–05	ENPPI (1)	1–0 (aet)	Ittihad Alexandria
75	2005–06	Al Ahly (34)	3–0	Zamalek
76	2006–07	Al Ahly (35)	4–3 (aet)	Zamalek
77	2007–08	Zamalek (21)	2–1	ENPPI
78	2008–09	Haras El Hodood (1)	1–1 (4–1 p)	ENPPI
79	2009–10	Haras El Hodood (2)	1–1 (5–4 p)	Al Ahly
80	2010–11	ENPPI (2)	2–1	Zamalek
—	2011–12	Not played due to the tragic events from Port Said Stadium riot.		
81	2012–13	Zamalek (22)	3–0	Wadi Degla
82	2013–14	Zamalek (23)	1–0	Smouha
83	2014–15	Zamalek (24)	2–0	Al Ahly
84	2015–16	Zamalek (25)	3–1	Al Ahly
85	2016–17	Al Ahly (36)	2–1 (aet)	Al Masry
86	2017–18	Zamalek (26)	1–1 (5–4 p)	Smouha
87	2018–19	Zamalek (27)	3–0	Pyramids
88	2019–20	Al Ahly (37)	1–1 (3–2 p)	El Gaish
89	2020–21	Zamalek (28)	2–1	Al Ahly
90	2021–22	Al Ahly (38)	2–1	Pyramids
91	2022–23	Al Ahly (39)	2–0	Zamalek
92	2023–24	Pyramids (1)	1–0	ZED FC
93	2024–25	Zamalek (29)	1–1 (8–7 p)	Pyramids
94	2025–26	Pyramids (2)	2–1	ZED FC

Notes:

- † The Winner and Runner-up of 1960–61 Egypt Cup qualified for United Arab Republic Cup.
- ‡ Title Shared.

== Performances ==
=== Performances by club ===
Club	Winner	Runner-up	Winning years
Al Ahly SC	39	16	1924, 1925, 1927, 1928, 1930, 1931, 1937, 1940, 1942, 1943, 1945, 1946, 1947, 1949, 1950, 1951, 1953, 1956, 1958, 1961, 1966, 1978, 1981, 1983, 1984, 1985, 1989, 1991, 1992, 1993, 1996, 2001, 2003, 2006, 2007, 2017, 2020, 2022, 2023
Zamalek SC	29	14	1922, 1932, 1935, 1938, 1941, 1943, 1944, 1952, 1955, 1957, 1958, 1959, 1960, 1962, 1975, 1977, 1979, 1988, 1999, 2002, 2008, 2013, 2014, 2015, 2016, 2018, 2019, 2021, 2025
El Ittihad Alexandria Club	6	8	1926, 1936, 1948, 1963, 1973, 1976
Tersana SC	6	3	1923, 1929, 1954, 1965, 1967, 1986
Al Mokawloon Al Arab SC	3	3	1990, 1995, 2004
Ismaily SC	2	4	1997, 2000
Pyramids FC	2	3	2024, 2026
Olympic Club	2	2	1933, 1934
ENPPI SC	2	2	2005, 2011
Haras El Hodoud SC	2	–	2009, 2010
Al Masry SC	1	9	1998
Al Teram SC	1	1	1939
El Qanah FC	1	1	1964
El Sekka El Hadid SC	–	7	—
Ghazl El Mahalla SC	–	6	—
Smouha SC	–	2	—
Ittihad El Shorta SC	–	2	—
Suez SC	–	2	—
ZED FC	–	2	—
Aswan SC	–	1	—
El Mansoura SC	–	1	—
Baladiyat El Mahalla SC	–	1	—
Wadi Degla SC	–	1	—
Tala'ea El Gaish SC	–	1	—

Notes:

- ‡ The 1942–43 and 1957–58 titles were shared.

== Scorers ==
=== All-time top scorers ===
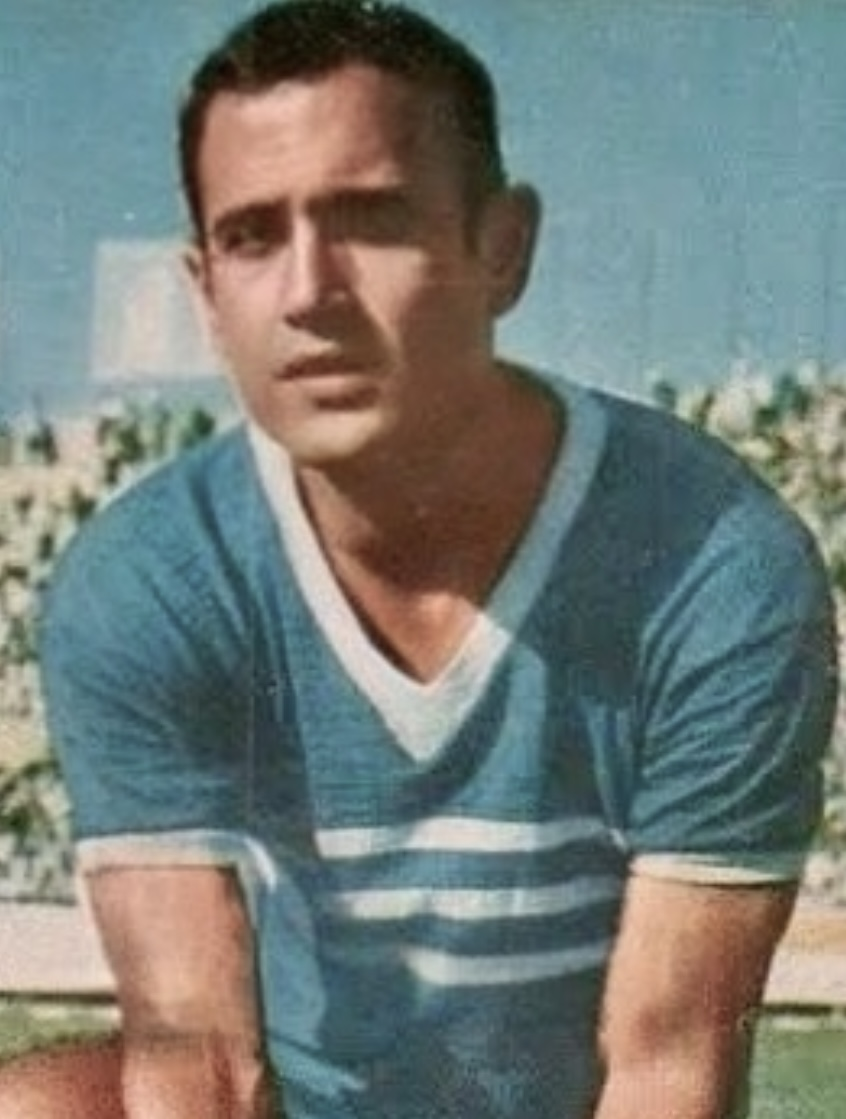
Hassan El-Shazly

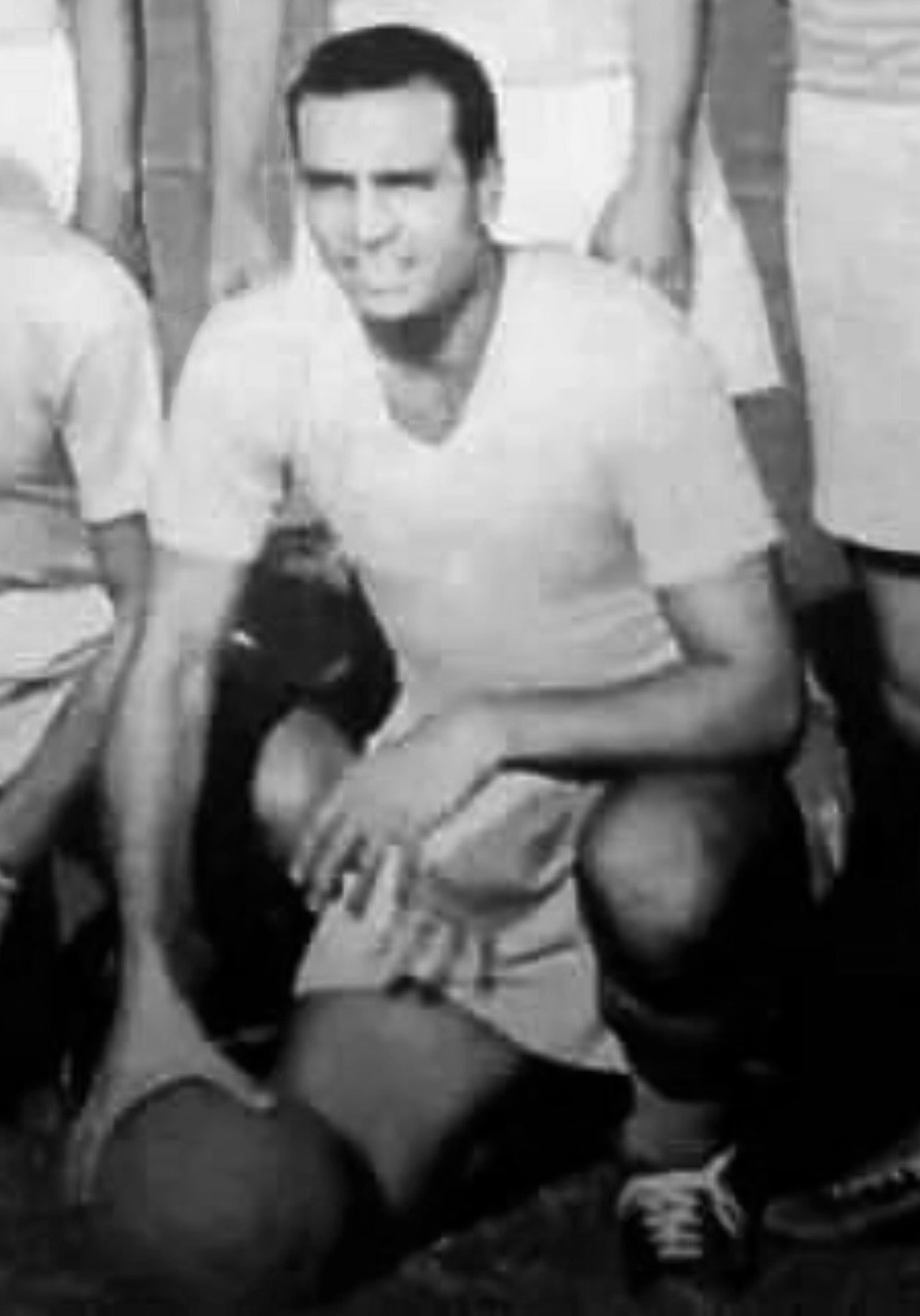
Alaa El-Hamouly

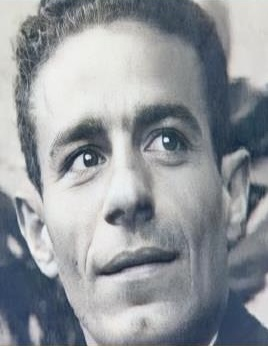
El-Sayed El-Dhizui

No.	Player	Teams	Goals
1	Ahmed Mekkawi	Al Ahly	35
2	Hassan El-Shazly	Tersana	32
3	Abdel-Karim Sakr	Zamalek / Al Ahly	31
4	El-Sayed El-Dhizui	Al Masry / Al Ahly	28
5	Alaa El-Hamouly	Zamalek	23
6	Mokhtar El Tetsh	Al Ahly	21
6	Akram Abdel-Majeed	Baladiyat El Mahalla SC / Zamalek / El Qanah	21
7	Abdel Halim Ali	Zamalek	20
8	Sharif El-Far	Zamalek	19
8	Emad Moteab	Al Ahly	19
9	Mohamed Latif	Zamalek	17

=== Per season ===
Year	Player	Goals	Club
2009–10	(Egypt) Mohamed Fadl	5	Al Ahly SC
2010–11			
2011–12		not played	
2012–13	(Egypt) Ahmed Gaafar	5	Zamalek SC
2013–14	(Egypt) Ahmed Hamoudi	6	Smouha SC
2014–15	(Ghana) John Antwi	6	Ismaily SC
2015–16	(Egypt) Basem Morsy	5	Zamalek SC
2016–17			
2017–18	(Democratic Republic of the Congo) Kabongo Kasongo	4	Zamalek SC
2018–19	(Ghana) John Antwi (Burkina Faso) Eric Traoré (Egypt) Khaled Kamar (Egypt) Mahmoud Kaoud (Egypt) Ahmed Raouf	3	Misr Lel Makkasa SC; Misr Lel Makkasa SC; Al Ittihad Alexandria Club; ENPPI SC; El Entag
2019–20	(Egypt) Shoukry Naguib	3	
2020–21	(Egypt) Youssef Obama	3	Zamalek SC
2021–22			
2022–23	(Tunisia) Seifeddine Jaziri	4	Zamalek SC
2023–24	(Egypt) Marwan Hamdy	4	Al Masry SC
2024–25			
2025–26			

== See also ==
- Egyptian Premier League
- Egyptian Super Cup
- Cairo League
- King's Cup
- EFA League Cup
- List of football clubs in Egypt
- Cairo derby
