= Al Ittihad Alexandria Club =

Association football club in Egypt

Al Ittihad
- Full name: Al Ittihad Alexandria Club (Al Ittihad Al Skandary)
- Nicknames: سيد البلد (Masters of the City) زعيم الثغر (El Thagher's Leaders)
- Founded: 4 August 1914; 112 years ago
- Ground: Alexandria Stadium, Alexandria
- Capacity: 13,660
- Chairman: Mohamed Ahmed Salama
- Manager: Hamza El Gamal
- League: Egyptian Premier League
- 2025–26: 17th
- Website: itthadalexsc.com
Home colours	Away colours	Third colours

Al Ittihad Alexandria Club (Arabic: نادي الإتحاد السكندري), locally known as El Ittihad El Skandary, is an Egyptian sports club based in Alexandria. The club is mainly known for its professional football team, which currently plays in the Egyptian Premier League, the highest league in the Egyptian football league system.

Founded in 1914 in Alexandria, the club is one of the oldest and most popular football clubs in Egypt. Al Ittihad was the first club that rushed to endorse the idea of founding the Egyptian Football Association in 1921, which significantly contributed to increasing the club's popularity in Alexandria. Its famous Chairman was Tawfik Abouhashem.

== Highlights ==
- 1906 Establishment of a club under the name of the club of the Union headed by Hassan Ismail.
- 1908 Change the name of the club from Union club to the Union National Club.
- 1910 Creation of United Champions Club headed by Abu Zeidi.
- 1912 Abdo El Hamami heads the United Champions Club.
- 1912 The merger of the National Union Club with El Haditha club under the name of the modern club headed by Hassan Rasmi, and this club became the strongest football club in Alexandria.
- 1914 The merger of El Haditha club with the United Champions Club under the name of Al Ittihad Club and so the name of Al Ittihad Club reappeared.
- 1918 The merger of Al Ittihad Club with the Alexandria Club under the name of Al Ittihad Club of Alexandria headed by Mohammed Shaheen.
- 2014 As Al Ittihad club was celebrating their year number (100) A match was held for Al Ittihad Club of Alexandria in the Alexandria Stadium against Sporting CP, Portugal, and ended the match with a positive draw 2–2.

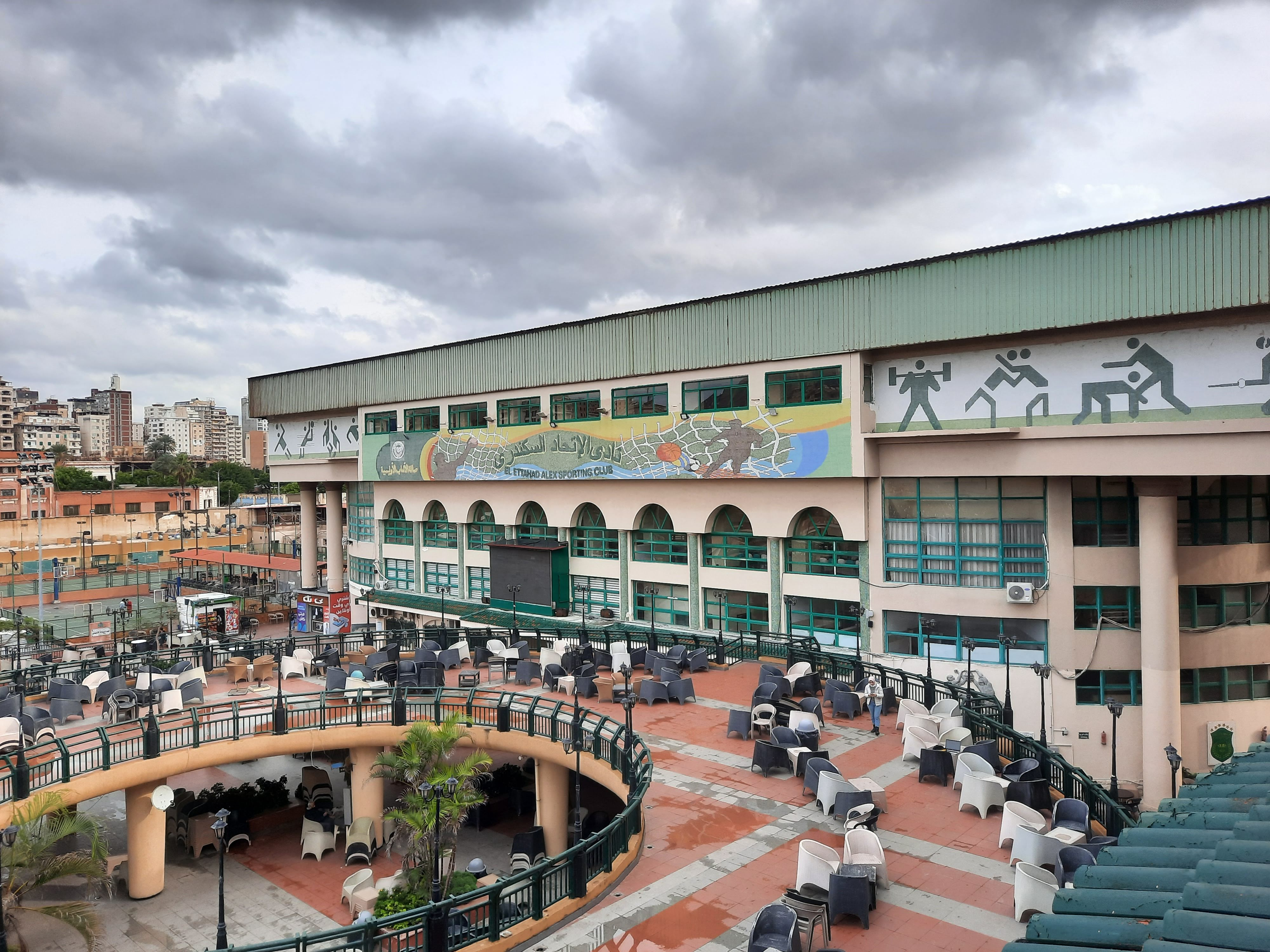
Al-Ittihad Alexandria Club from the inside.

== Kits and colours ==
=== Kit manufacturers ===
Period	Kit manufacturer	Notes
2011–2013	(Italy) Givova	
2013–2014	(Italy) Macron	
2014	(Italy) Erreà	Used in centenary match only
2014–2017	(Germany) Adidas	
2017–2020	(Germany) Uhlsport	
2020–2022	(China) Xtep	
2022–2023	(Germany) Adidas	
2023–	(Spain) Kelme	

=== Kits gallery ===
2018-2019 Home	2018-2019 Away	2019-2020 Home	2019-2020 Away

2020-2021 Home	2020-2021 Away	2021-2022 Home	2021-2022 Away

== Alexandria Derby ==
Both being based in Alexandria; Smouha and Al Ittihad have a famous rivalry. The rivalry stems from the fact that both teams are the biggest in Alexandria and share the same stadium Alexandria International Stadium.

== Honours ==
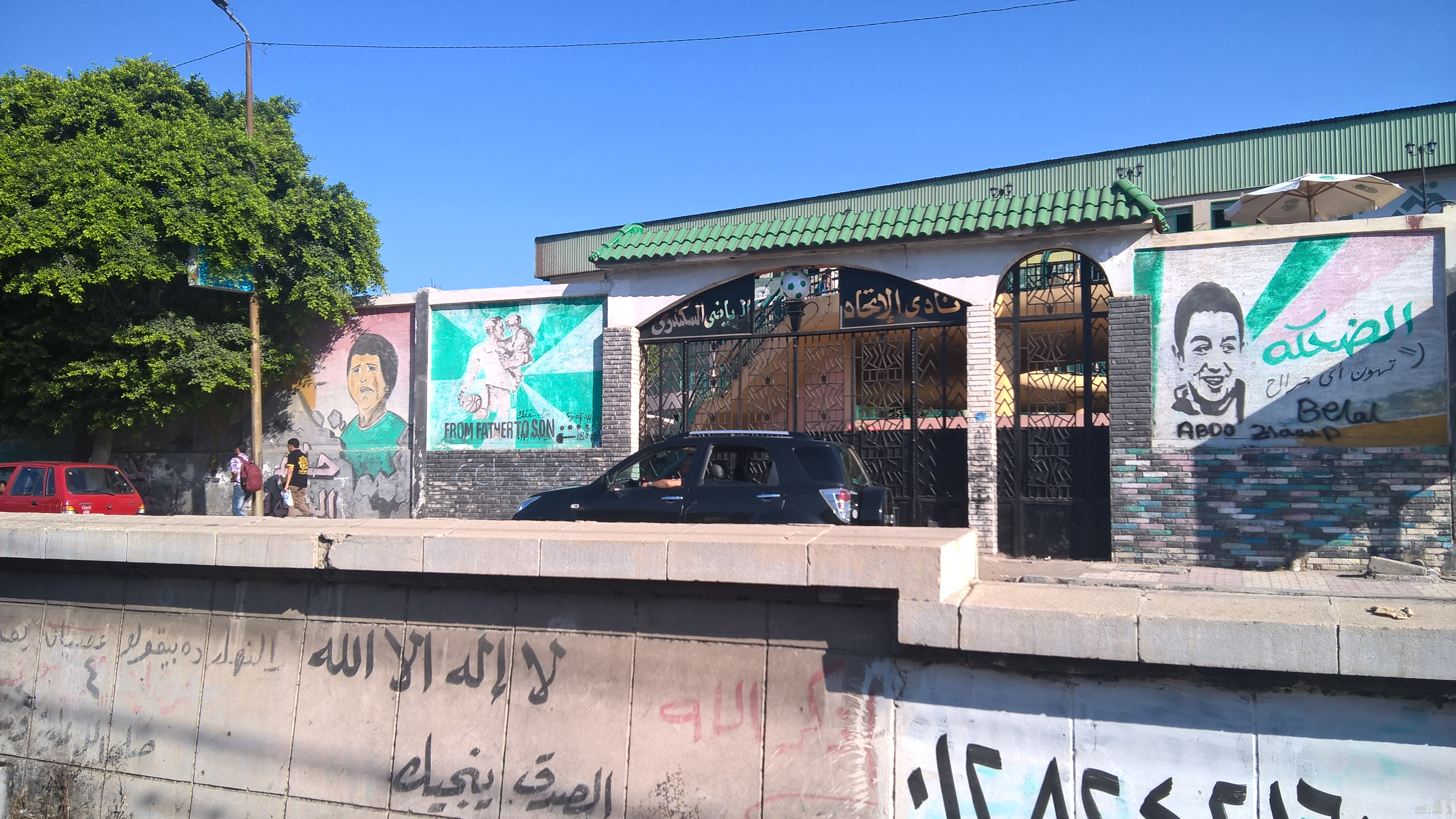
A view outside the club's headquarters in Shatby in 2017.

- Egypt Cup: 6

1926, 1935–36, 1948, 1963, 1973, 1976

- Sultan Hussein Cup: 1

1935

=== Regional ===
- Alexandria Zone League: 27 (record)

From 1927 to 1953

== Performance in CAF competitions ==
- FR = First round
- SR = Second round
- QF = Quarter-final
- SF = Semi-final

Season	Competition	Round	Country	Club	Home	Away	Aggregate
1975	African Cup Winners' Cup	FR	Ethiopia	Saint George	2–0	0–0	2–0
1975	African Cup Winners' Cup	QF	Cameroon	Tonnerre Yaoundé	4–0	w/o	w/o (Note: The second leg was abandoned in the second half with Tonnerre Yaoundé leading 3–0 after Al Ittihad players walked off to protest the officiating and the improper match atmosphere. Al Ittihad were disqualified from the competition by CAF and the tie was awarded to Tonnerre Yaoundé. After coming back to Egypt, Al Ittihad players said that they were attacked by both the fans and the local police officers during the match after protesting against the match officials.)
1977	African Cup Winners' Cup	SR	Algeria	MO Constantine	3–1	0–1	3–2
1977	African Cup Winners' Cup	QF	Tanzania	Rangers International	2–0	0–0	2–0
1977	African Cup Winners' Cup	SF	Cameroon	Tonnerre Yaoundé	1–0	0–2	1–2
1979	African Cup Winners' Cup	FR	Kenya	Gor Mahia	w/o (Note: Gor Mahia won on walkover after Al Ittihad withdrew.)		
2006	CAF Confederation Cup	FR	Rwanda	Rayon Sports	3–0	0–1	3–1
2006	CAF Confederation Cup	SR	Tunisia	Espérance de Tunis	1–0	0–1	1–1 (3–4 p)

== Performance in Arab competitions ==
Season	Competition	Round	Country	Club	Result
2018–19	Arab Club Champions Cup	Play-off round	Morocco	FUS Rabat	1-1
2018–19	Arab Club Champions Cup	Play-off round	Kuwait	Al-Salmiya	5-0
2018–19	Arab Club Champions Cup	Play-off round	Djibouti	ASAS Djibouti Télécom	8-0
2018–19	Arab Club Champions Cup	First Round	Tunisia	Espérance Sportive de Tunis	3-3 on aggregate Al Ittihad won on away goals
2018–19	Arab Club Champions Cup	Second Round	Egypt	Zamalek	1-1 on aggregate Al Ittihad won 4-3 on penalties
2018–19	Arab Club Champions Cup	Quarter Final	Saudi Arabia	Al Hilal	Al Hilal won 3-0 on aggregate.

== Performance in domestic competitions ==
Egyptian Clubs Competitions
Year	League	Position	Egypt Cup	League Cup	Super Cup
2003–04	Egyptian Premier League	5	Round of 16	not held	
2004–05	Egyptian Premier League	9	Runner Up	not held	
2005–06	Egyptian Premier League	7	Round of 16	not held	
2006–07	Egyptian Premier League	13	Round of 32	not held	
2007–08	Egyptian Premier League	10	Quarter Final	not held	
2008–09	Egyptian Premier League	11	Round of 32	not held	
2009–10	Egyptian Premier League	10	Quarter-finals	not held	
2010–11	Egyptian Premier League	14	Round of 16	not held	
2011–12	Egyptian Premier League	not finished	not held	not held	
2012–13	Egyptian Premier League	not finished	Round of 16	not held	
2013–14	Egyptian Premier League	3 (Group 1)	Round of 32	not held	
2014–15	Egyptian Premier League	14	Quarter Final	not held	
2015–16	Egyptian Premier League	14	Quarter Final	not held	
2016–17	Egyptian Premier League	8	Round of 16	not held	
2017–18	Egyptian Premier League	11	Round of 16	not held	
2018–19	Egyptian Premier League	11	Semi Final	not held	
2019–20	Egyptian Premier League	10	Semi Final	not held	
2020–21	Egyptian Premier League	7	Round of 16	not held	
2021–22	Egyptian Premier League	12	Round of 32	Group Stage	
2022–23	Egyptian Premier League	8	Round of 16	Semi Final	
2023–24	Egyptian Premier League	11	Round of 32	Semi Final	
2024–25	Egyptian Premier League	15	Round of 32	Group Stage	
2025–26	Egyptian Premier League	17	Round of 32	Group Stage	

== Players ==
=== Current squad ===
As of 22 September 2026

Note: Flags indicate national team as defined under FIFA eligibility rules; some limited exceptions apply. Players may hold more than one non-FIFA nationality.

No.	Pos.	Nation	Player
1	GK	EGY	Sobhi Soliman
4	DF	EGY	Islam Abdellah (on loan from ZED)
5	DF	EGY	Mostafa Ibrahim
7	DF	EGY	Mido Mostafa
—	DF	EGY	Mazen Osama
8	MF	EGY	Mohamed Tony
—	DF	EGY	Abdo Hesham
10	FW	EGY	Hossam Hassan
11	FW	EGY	Youssry Wahid (on loan from National Bank)
12	DF	EGY	Moamen Sherif
—	MF	EGY	Anas Wael
14	MF	EGY	Mohamed Fakhri
16	GK	EGY	Ahmed El Arabi
18	FW	NGR	John Ebuka
19	MF	EGY	Ahmed El Sayed

No.	Pos.	Nation	Player
21	MF	EGY	Ahmed Hamdi
22	FW	EGY	Nour Alaa (on loan from Cleopatra)
23	MF	NGR	Saviour Isaac
24	DF	EGY	Momen Awad
25	MF	EGY	Mahmoud Emad (on loan from National Bank)
30	DF	EGY	Khaled Mosaad
31	GK	EGY	Ali El Gabry
35	FW	ZAM	Pascal Phiri (on loan from Pyramids)
37	MF	EGY	Ahmed Atef
44	MF	UGA	Kenneth Semakula
47	DF	EGY	Mostafa Moawad
77	MF	EGY	Ahmed Eid
80	FW	NGR	Joseph Arumala

== All time top Egyptian Premier League Scorers ==
Goalscorers
#	Player	Goals
1	Mohamed Diab Al Attar	81
2	Ahmed Sary	40
=2	Mabululu	40
4	Eid Ahmed	38
5	Abdel Fattah El Garm	36
6	Shehta (Abdel Rehim Younes)	31
7	Raafat Attia	26
=7	Youssef Hamdy	26
9	Gaber El Khawaga	25
10	Ahmed Saleh	24
=10	Fouad Morsi	24

== Management ==
=== Board of directors ===
Office	Name
President	(Egypt) Mohamed Salama
Vice President	(Egypt) Ibrahim Shaaban
Fund Secretary	(Egypt) Hazem ElRegal
Executive Manager	(Egypt) Gasser Mounir
Member	(Egypt) Mohamed ElHelw
Member	(Egypt) Mohamed Khamis
Member	(Egypt) Ahmed Rafaat
Member	(Egypt) Yasser Abdallah
Member	(Egypt) Ismail Mohamed
Member	(Egypt) Hesham ElTorky
Member	(Egypt) Elsayed Faisal
Member	(Egypt) Samy Bateaa
Member	(Egypt) Mohamed Ramadan

== Managers ==
- (Germany) Diethelm Ferner (1 July 2000 – 30 June 2002)
- (Egypt) Mohamed Omar (Jan 2002 – 2 July)
- (Germany) Rainer Zobel (4 November 2002 – 31 December 2003)
- (Egypt) Mohamed Omar (May 2003 – 4 April)
- (Egypt) Mohamed Salah (July 2004 – 4 Oct)
- (Serbia) Slobodan Pavković (July 2006 – 6 Dec)
- (Egypt) Mohamed Omar (Dec 2006 – 7 Aug)
- (Egypt) Mohamed Salah (Sept 2007 – 8 Jan)
- (Egypt) Taha Basry (1 January 2008 – 26 August 2009)
- (Brazil) Cabralzinho (4 September 2009 – 21 November 2010)
- (Egypt) Mohamed Amer (22 November 2010 – 6 April 2011)
- (Egypt) Ahmed Sary (April 2011)
- (Spain) José Maqueda (2 August 2011 – 1 December 2012)
- (Egypt) Ahmed Sary (16 December 2012 – 12 March 2013)
- (Brazil) Jose Kléber (20 March 2013 – 12 May 2013)
- (Egypt) Ahmed Sary (12 May 2013 – 22 July 2013)
- (Egypt) Talaat Youssef (23 July 2013 – 16 December 2013)
- (Egypt) Mounir Oukala (interim) (21 December 2013 – 31 December 2013)
- (France) Denis Lavagne (31 December 2013–14)
- (Egypt) Talaat Youssef (Aug 2014 – Oct 2014)
- (Egypt) Hossam Hassan (Oct 2014 – July 2015)
- (Bulgaria) Stoycho Mladenov (July 2015 – Nov 2015)
- (Portugal) Leonel Pontes (Nov 2015 – March 2016)
- (Egypt) Mokhtar Mokhtar (March 2016 – Feb 2017)
- (Spain) José Maqueda (February 2017 – 2018)
- (Egypt) Talaat Youssef (Jun 2019 – Oct 2020)
- (Egypt) Mounir Oukala (interim) (Oct 2020 – Oct 2020)
- (Egypt) Hossam Hassan (Oct 2020 – March 2022)
- (Egypt) Emad El Nahhas (March 2022 – 9 August 2022)
- (Egypt) Mohamed Omar (9 August 2022 – 9 September 2022)
- (Serbia) Zoran Manojlović (10 September 2022 – 17 July 2023)
- (Cyprus) Nikodimos Papavasiliou (19 August 2024 – 8 January 2025)
- (Egypt) Talaat Youssef (9 January 2025 – 14 March 2025)
- (Egypt) Magdy Abdelaty (14 March 2025 – June 2025)
- (Egypt) Ahmed Sami (25 June 2025 – 18 September 2025)
- (Egypt) Tamer Mostafa (20 September 2025 – 10 April 2026)
- (Algeria) Miloud Hamdi (11 April 2026 – 29 May 2026)
- (Egypt) Hamza El Gamal (9 June 2026 – present)
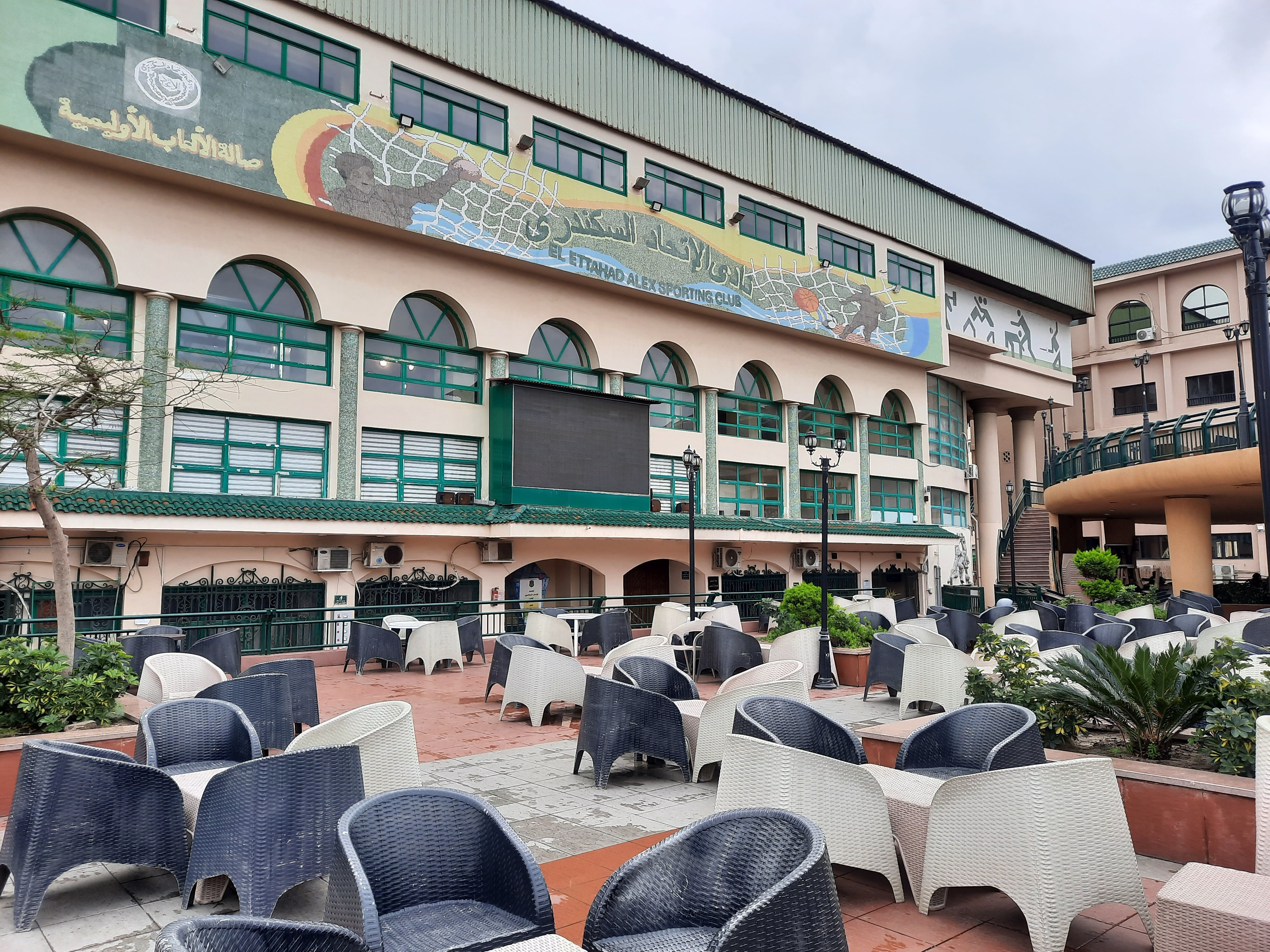

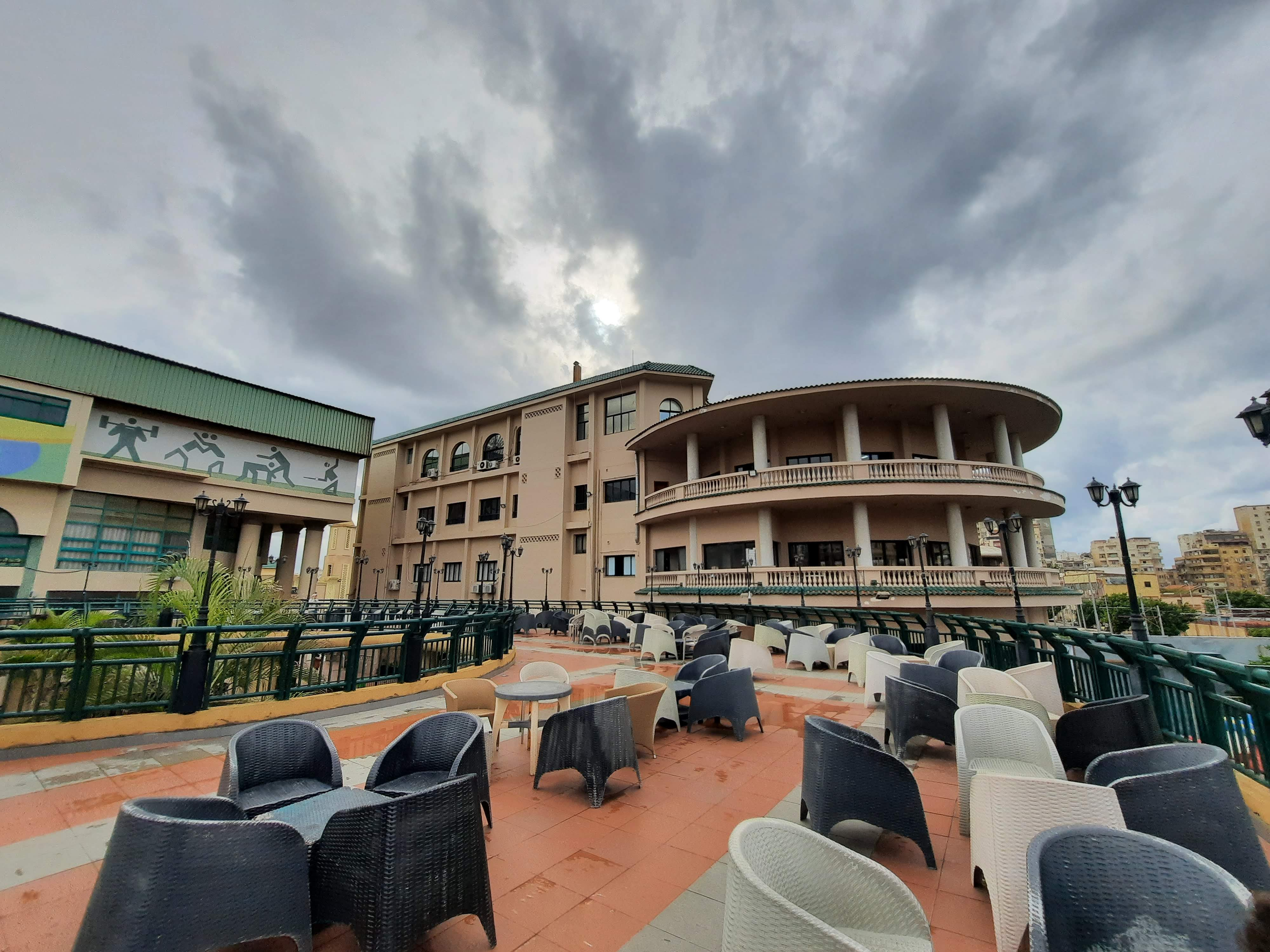

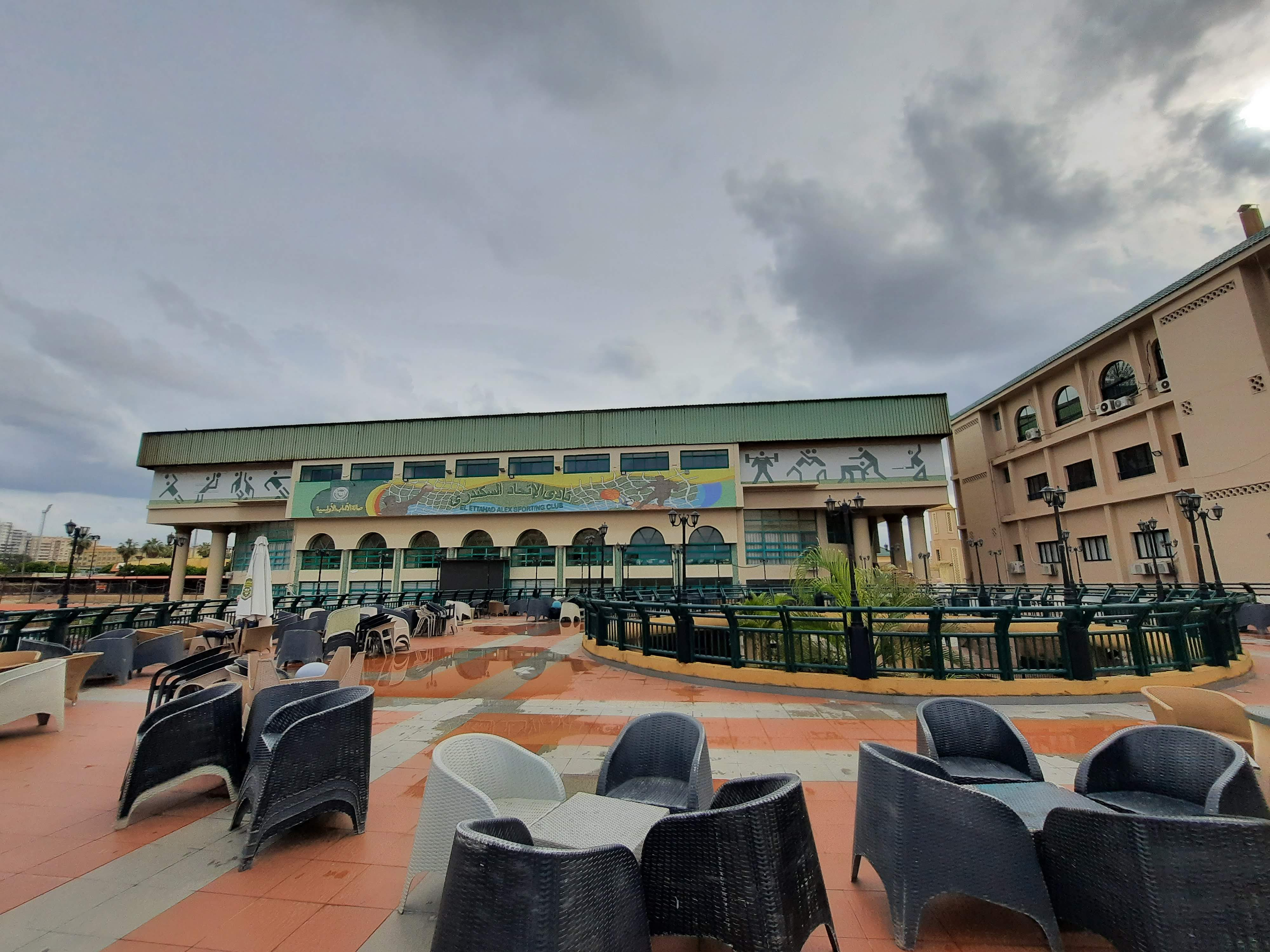

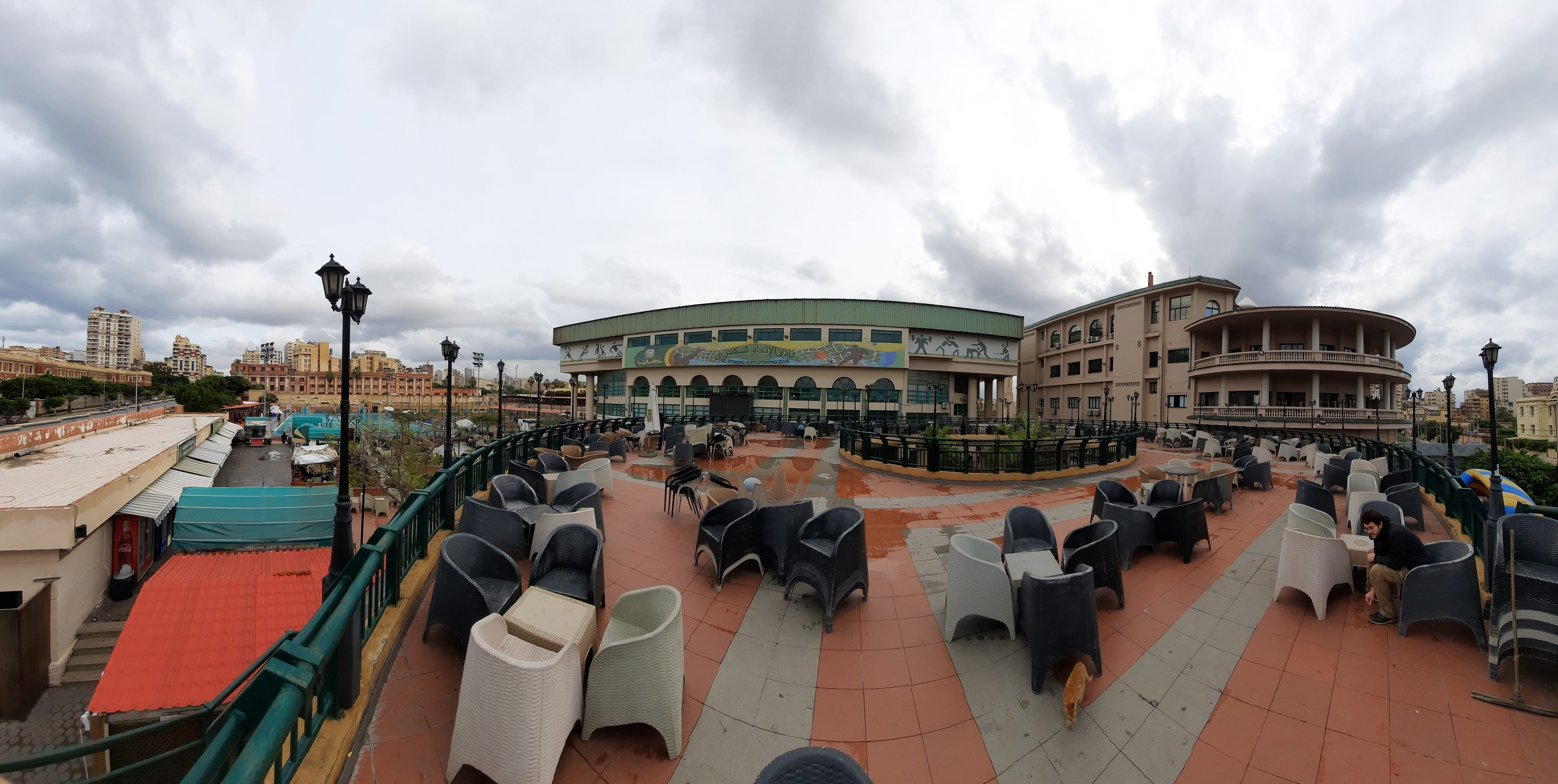

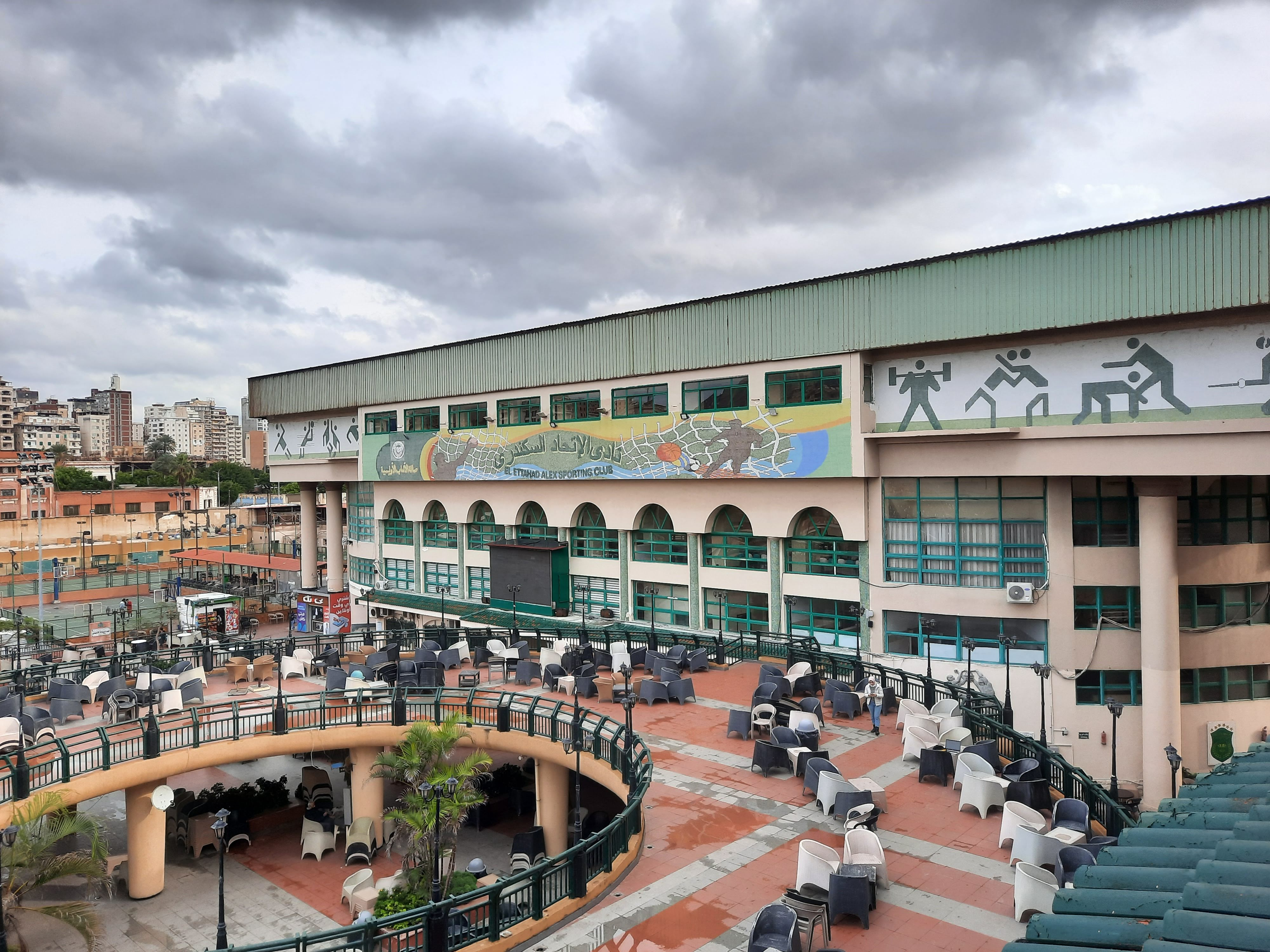

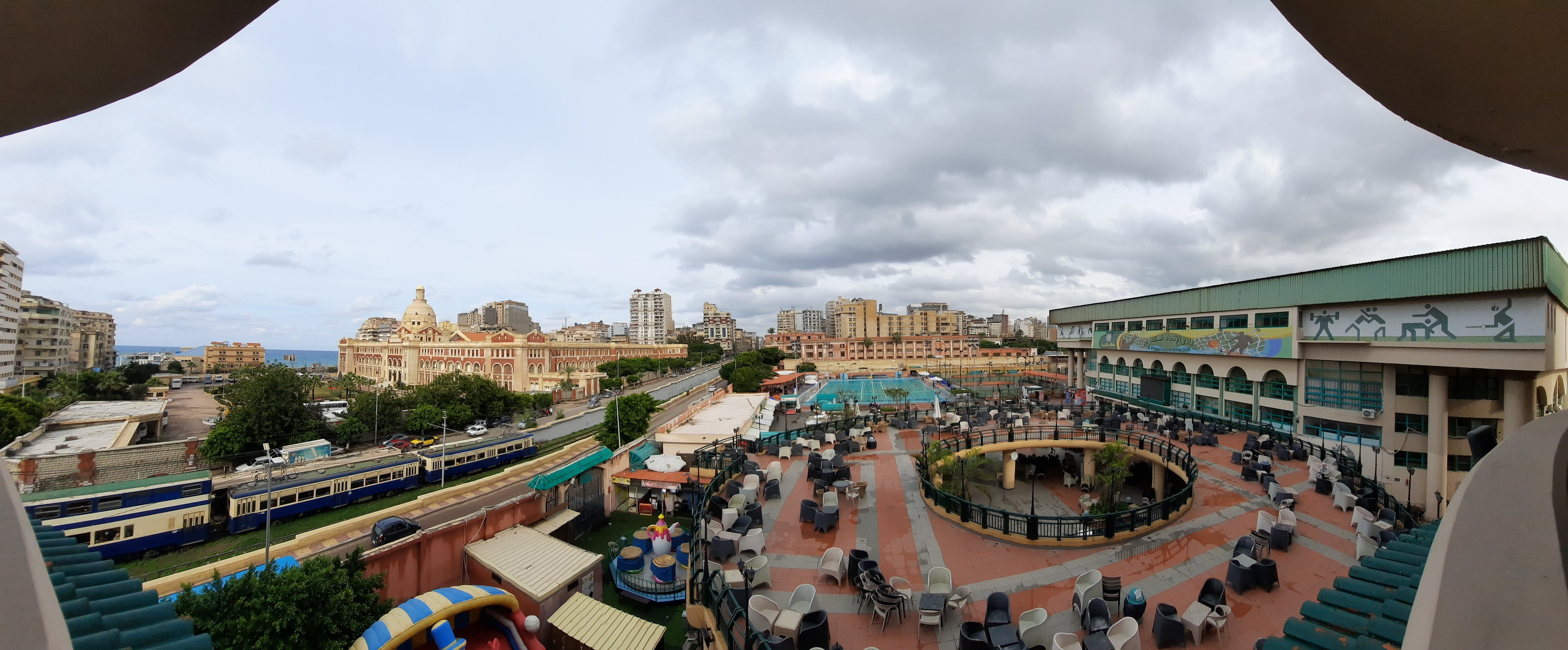

== See also ==
- Al Ittihad Alexandria (basketball)
- Egyptian Premier League
- Egypt Cup
- Egyptian League Cup
- Sultan Hussein Cup
