= El Sekka El Hadid SC =

Association football club in Cairo, Egypt

- Full name: El Sekka El Hadid Sporting Club نادي السكة الحديد للألعاب الرياضية
- Nickname(s): Sekka Hadid
- Short name: SKH
- Founded: 1903; 122 years ago
- Ground: El Sekka El Hadid Stadium
- Capacity: 25,000
- Chairman: Alaa Ezz El-Din
- Manager: Mohammed Torky kareem
- League: Egyptian Second Division
- 2023–24: Second Division, 7th of 20
Home colours	Away colours

El Sekka El Hadid Sporting Club (Arabic: نادي السكة الحديد للألعاب الرياضية), is an Egyptian football club based in Cairo, Egypt. The club plays in the Egyptian Third Division, the third tier of the Egyptian football league system.

Founded in 1903, the club is the oldest football club in Egypt, and the Middle East.

== History ==
In 1903, El Sekka El Hadid Club formed the first football team in Egypt. The team was mainly formed of British and Italian engineers working in the maintenance workshops affiliated to the Railway Authority of the time. Among the former club players is Hussein Hegazi, Dulwich Hamlet's former player. When it was necessary to have a national football competition in Egypt, El Sekka El Hadid became one of the Egyptian Premier League founders. The team secured eighth place (out of 11) in the league's first season (1948–49).

As of 2010, El Sekka El Hadid participated in 23 seasons of the Egyptian Premier League; 1992–93 season being the team's last. By the end of 2009–10 Egyptian Second Division, Al-Sekka Al-Hadid occupied the last place in Group B and were relegated to the Egyptian Third Division.

== Honours ==
- Cairo League
  - Winners (2): 1923–24, 1925–26
- Sultan Hussein Cup
  - Winners (2): 1923–24, 1935–36
- Egypt Cup
  - Runners-up (7): 1922–23, 1923–24, 1935–36, 1936–37, 1945–46, 1950–51, 1963–64
