= Olympic Club (Egypt) =

Association football club in Alexandria, Egypt

- Full name: Egyptian Olympic Club النادي الأوليمبي المصري
- Short name: OLY
- Founded: 17 April 1905; 121 years ago (as Red Star Club)
- Ground: Izz al-Din Yacoub Stadium
- Capacity: 15,000
- Chairman: Nasser El Shazly
- Manager: Ahmed Sari
- League: Egyptian Second Division
- 2020–2021: Second Division, 1st (Group C)
- Website: http://olympiclub.com/
Home colours	Away colours	Third colours

Egyptian Olympic Club (Arabic: النادي الأوليمبي المصري) is an Egyptian football and sports club based in Alexandria, Egypt. The club currently plays in the Egyptian Second Division, the second-highest tier in the Egyptian football league system. 'Izz al-Din Yacoub' Stadium is the home ground for the club, which has been renovated in 2019 for 20 million EGP.

Founded in 1905, the club is one of the oldest clubs in Egypt and Africa. Its football team is also known for winning the Egyptian Premier League once in 1966 and for winning the Egypt Cup twice in 1933 and 1934.

== Name changes ==
- Red Star Club (1905–1924)
- Olympic Club (1924–Present)

== Football ==
The football Team won the Egyptian Premier League in 1966. The team's level began to drop due to financial problems, until it was relegated in the 2008–09 season and has never showed up in the Premier League since.

== Honors ==
- Egyptian Premier League: 1

1965–66

- Egypt Cup: 2

1932–33, 1933–34

== Performance in CAF competitions ==
- FR = First round
- SR = Second round

Season	Competition	Round	Country	Club	Home	Away	Aggregate
1967	African Cup of Champions Clubs	FR	Sudan	Al Hilal	3–1	1–0	4–1
1967	African Cup of Champions Clubs	SR	Ethiopia	Saint George	w/o	2–3	w/o (Note: Olympic Club withdrew after the first leg due to the Six-Day War.)
