= 1987–88 Zamalek SC season =

Zamalek
1987–88 season
- Chairman: Hassan Amer
- Manager: (England) Richie Barker (Egypt) Essam Baheeg
- Stadium: Cairo International Stadium
- Egyptian Premier League: Winners
- Egypt Cup: Winners
- Afro-Asian Championship: Winners
- African Cup of Champions Clubs: Quarter-Finals
- Top goalscorer: Gamal Abdel Hamid (10)

The 1987-88 Zamalek SC season was Zamalek SC association football club's 78th season in existence. The club competed in the Egyptian Premier League, Egypt Cup, Afro-Asian Club Championship and the African Cup of Champions Clubs. The club were crowned champions of their domestic league, the Egyptian Premier League for the sixth time in their history because of a tie breaker on goal difference against the defending champions, Al Ahly SC. The Egyptian club also won the Egypt Cup, and the Afro-Asian Club Championship this season.

== Squad ==
Note: Flags indicate national team as defined under FIFA eligibility rules; some limited exceptions apply. Players may hold more than one non-FIFA nationality.

Pos.	Nation	Player
GK	EGY	Adel El-Maamour
GK	EGY	Ayman Taher
GK	EGY	Emad El-Mandouh
DF	EGY	Ahmed Ramzy
DF	EGY	Ashraf Kasem
DF	EGY	Badr Hamed
DF	EGY	Gamal Abdullah
DF	EGY	Hesham Ibrahim
DF	EGY	Hesham Yakan
DF	EGY	Ibrahim Youssef
DF	EGY	Khaled Galal
DF	EGY	Mohamed Salah El-Din
DF	EGY	Nabil Mahmoud
DF	EGY	Said El-Godaii
MF	EGY	Ayman Younes
MF	EGY	Effat Nssar
MF	EGY	Farouk Gaafar
MF	EGY	Hamada Abdel Latif
MF	EGY	Ismail Youssef
MF	EGY	Magdi Shalabi
MF	EGY	Magdy Tolba
MF	EGY	Medhat Mekki
MF	EGY	Mohamed Helmy
MF	EGY	Reda Abdel-Aal
FW	EGY	Adel Abdel Wahed
FW	EGY	Ahmed El-Shazly
FW	EGY	Gamal Abdel Hamid
FW	EGY	Nasr Ibrahim
FW	EGY	Tarek Yehia
FW	EGY	Zakaria Nasef

== Egyptian Premier League ==
=== League table ===
Pos	Team	Pld	W	D	L	GF	GA	GD	Pts
1	Zamalek SC (C)	22	16	5	1	43	8	+35	53
2	Al Ahly	22	17	2	3	37	10	+27	53
3	Ghazl El Mahalla	22	11	8	3	30	14	+16	41
4	Ismaily	22	10	6	6	19	14	+5	36
5	Al Masry	22	7	9	6	19	20	−1	30

Source: rsssf.com
(C) Champions

=== Matches ===
Win Draw Loss

15 December 1987 Week 1	Zamalek SC	0 – 0	Tersana SC
Note: The match was postponed.

11 September 1987 Week 2	Al Ittihad Alexandria	1 – 0	Zamalek SC
	Abbas (?) (pen.)

23 October 1987 Week 3	Zamalek SC	9 – 0	Naseeg Helwan
	Abdel-Latif 6'; Helmy 27'; Abdel-Hameed 28', 53', 66'; Yehia 29', 31'; Nasef 73', 85' (pen.)
Note: The match was postponed.

11 October 1987 Week 4	Ghazl El Mahalla SC	1 – 2	Zamalek SC
	Mahmoud El-Mashaqui 10'		Abdel-Hameed 5', 79'

18 October 1987 Week 5	Zamalek SC	2 – 0	El Masry
	Yehia 6' (pen.); Abdel-Hameed 32'

25 December 1987 Week 6	Al Ahly SC	1 – 1	Zamalek SC
	Hassan 87'		Younes 24'

1 November 1987 Week 7	Zamalek SC	3 – 0	El-Olympi
	Abdel-Hameed 17'; Youssef 47'; Helmy 53'

17 November 1987 Week 8	Zamalek SC	0 – 0	Ismaily SC

21 November 1987 Week 9	Zamalek SC	3 – 0	Ghazl Domiat
	Helmy 31'; Abdel-Hameed 45+4'; Abdel-Aal (?)

27 November 1987 Week 10	Zamalek SC	1 – 1	Al Merreikh
	El-Desouki El-Amalawi 6'		Helmy 65'

13 January 1988 Week 11	Zamalek SC	3 – 2	El-Mokawloon SC
	Younes 2'; Yehia 40', 63'

17 January 1988 Week 12	Tersana SC	1 – 1	Zamalek SC
	Fouad 77'		Nasef 54'

23 January 1988 Week 13	Zamalek SC	2 – 0	El Ittihad Alexandria
	Younes 65'; Nassar 80'

27 Jan 1988 Week 14	Naseeg Helwan	0 – 2	Zamalek SC
			Nassar 2', 89'

9 June 1988 Week 15	Zamalek SC	1 – 0	Ghazl El Mahalla SC
	Younes 24'

8 April 1988 Week 16	El Masry	0 – 2	Zamalek SC
	Abdel-Hameed 45+1', 61'

24 June 1988 Week 17	Zamalek SC	2 – 1	Al Ahly SC
	El-Shazly 40'; Mahmoud 53'		Hamed 22'

18 April 1988 Week 17	El-Olympi	0 – 3	Zamalek SC
	=		Ramzy 28'; Yehia 85'; Galal 88'

24 April 1988 Week 18	Zamalek SC	1 – 0	Ismaily SC
	Yehia 57'

6 May 1988 Week 19	Ghazl Domiat	0 – 1	Zamalek SC
			Ramzy 86'

13 May 1988 Week 20	Zamalek SC	3 – 0	Al Merreikh
	Nassar 55'; Abdel-Aal 75'; Youssef 85'

6 May 1988 Week 21	El Mokawloon SC	0 – 1	Zamalek SC
			Younes 50'

== Egypt Cup ==
Win Draw Loss

25 May 1988 Round 2	Gomhoriat Shebien	1 – 3	Zamalek SC
	??		Gamal Abdel Hamid 37'; Effat Nssar 40'; Tarek Yehia 75'

8 July 1988 Quarter Final	Zamalek SC	2 – 1	El Masry
	Medhat Mekki 13'; Ahmed Ramzy 21'

1 July 1988 Semifinal	Zamalek SC	3 – 1	Ismaily SC
	Tarek Yehia 7' (pen.), 73'; Reda Abdel-Aal 52'		Ismail Toto 58'

22 July 1988 Final	Zamalek SC	1 – 0	El Ittihad Alexandria
	Tarek Yehia 7'

== Afro-Asian Championship ==
5 February 1988	Zamalek (Egypt)	2 – 0	(Japan) Furukawa Electric	Cairo Stadium
15:00	Nssar 47'; Abd El-Hamid 60'			Attendance: 40,000; Referee: Mohamed Hansal (Algeria)

== African Cup of Champions Clubs ==
=== First round ===
First leg	Zamalek (Egypt)	v	(Equatorial Guinea) Juvenil Reyes

Second leg	Juvenil Reyes (Equatorial Guinea)	v (w/o agg.)	(Egypt) Zamalek

Juvenil Reyes withdrew.

== See also ==
- Football in Egypt
- List of football clubs in Egypt
