= Ismail Youssef =

Egyptian football manager (born 1964)

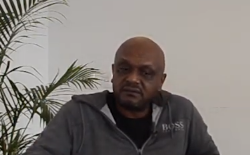

Personal information
- Full name: Ismail Youssef Awadallah Mohamed
- Date of birth: 28 June 1964 (age 62)
- Position: Midfielder

Senior career*
Years	Team	Apps	(Gls)
1983–1997	Zamalek		

International career
1987–1997	Egypt	86	(4)

Managerial career
- Egypt U-20 (Assistant)
- Egypt (Assistant)
- 2007–2010: El Gouna
- 2010–2011: Itesalat
- 2011–2012: Zamalek (Assistant)
- 2012: Zamalek (Caretaker)
- 2013–2014: El-Entag El-Harby
- 2014–2016: Zamalek (Football Director)
- * Club domestic league appearances and goals

Ismail Youssef Awadallah Mohamed (Arabic: إِسْمَاعِيل يُوسُف عَوَض الله مُحَمَّد; born 28 June 1964 in Giza) is a former Egyptian football player. He is currently the assistant manager of the Egyptian Premier League team; Zamalek. Ismail is the youngest brother of two football players; El Sayed and Ibrahim.

== Playing career ==
=== Club ===
Youssef spent his entire career with Zamalek, he played from 1983 through 1997. He played a total of 325 matches for Zamalek in both the league and the cup. He won with Zamalek the Egyptian Premier League for four times in (1983–84, 1987–88, 1991–92, 1992–93). He also won with his team the Egypt Cup once in 1987–88, and the Egyptian Friendship Cup in 1986. On the continental level, he won with Zamalek four titles of the African Cup of Champions Clubs in (1984, 1986, 1993, 1996), the CAF Super Cup for twice in (1994, 1997), and the Afro-Asian Club Championship twice in (1987, 1997).

=== International ===
Youssef played 97 international matches for the Egypt national football team. He scored four goals for his country. Notably, he played in the Egyptian squad that participated in the 1990 FIFA World Cup. He played all of Egypt's matches. Youssef also participated in three Africa Cup of Nation tournaments; 1992, 1994 and 1996 editions.

== Coaching career ==
Former Assistant manager of Egyptian national youth team under 20 years
Qualified for World Cup & Won African Cup of nations

Ismail Youssef coached El Gouna from 2007 till 2010. Ismail joined El Gouna FC after the sacking of Ramadan El Sayed following a disastrous run in the early stages of the competition.

He was hired as the head coach of Itesalat after leaving El Gouna in 2010 but resigned 10 months later to join the technical staff of his former club Zamalek SC as the assistant coach to Egyptian coaching legend Hassan Shehata.

He was hired as the assistant coach of Zamalek SC with Hassan Shehata, and he took command for only one match against TP Mazembe when Zamalek SC lose by 2 goals, he return to his position as assistant coach with the new manager Jorvan Vieira, leave the club after two matches when the season is finished.

== Honours ==
=== As a Player ===
Zamalek

14 Titles for Zamalek as a player

- Egyptian Premier League [4]: 1983–84, 1987–88, 1991–92, 1992–93.
- Egypt Cup [1]: 1987–88.
- Egyptian Friendship Cup [1]: 1986.
- African Cup of Champions Clubs [4]: 1984, 1986, 1993, 1996.
- CAF Super Cup [2]: 1994, 1997.
- Afro-Asian Club Championship [2]: 1987, 1997.
- Al-Ahram Hebdo Award: Player of the Year in Egypt 1996

=== As a Coach ===
Egypt

- African Youth Cup of Nations Champion 2003

=== As assistant coach ===
Egypt

- Egypt youth team he qualified for World Cup under 20 years
- Egypt youth team he qualified for African Nation Cup under 20 years
