= Mohamed Salah (footballer, born 1956) =

Egyptian football manager

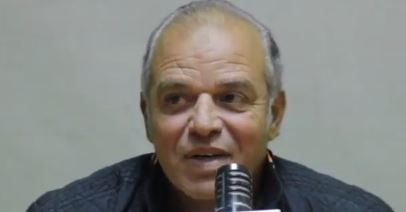

Personal information
- Full name: Mohamed Salah El-Din
- Date of birth: 29 March 1956 (age 70)
- Place of birth: Cairo, Egypt

Youth career
- Zamalek

Senior career*
Years	Team	Apps	(Gls)
1975–1988	Zamalek		

International career
1978–1987	Egypt		

Managerial career
- 1999–2001: Maaden
- 2001–2002: Baladyet El Mahalla
- 2002–2002: Goldi
- 2003–2004: Ghazl El Mahalla
- 2004–2004: Ittihad El Iskandary
- 2005–2006: El Masry
- 2006–2007: Tanta
- 2007–2008: Ittihad El Iskandary
- 2008–2008: Baladyet El Mahalla
- 2008–2008: El Tersana
- 2009–2010: El Mansoura SC
- 2010–2011: El Telefonat
- 2011–2011: Al-Shoulla
- 2013–2014: Wehda Mecca
- 2014–2015: Zamalek (Assist. coach)
- 2015–2015: Zamalek SC
- 2015–2015: Zamalek (Managing Director)
- 2015–2015: Zamalek
- 2015–2016: Zamalek (Assist. coach)
- 2016–2016: Zamalek (Caretaker Manager)
- 2016–2016: Zamalek (Assist. coach)
- 2016–2016: Zamalek (Caretaker Manager)
- 2016–2016: Zamalek (Assist. coach)
- 2017–2017: Haras El Hodoud
- 2017–2017: Zamalek (Caretaker Manager)
- 2017–2018: Nogoom El Mostakbal
- 2018–2018: Pharco
- 2018–2019: FC Masr
- 2019–2019: Suez SC
- 2019–2020: Al Tarsana SC
- 2020–2020: Nogoom FC
- 2020–2020: Tanta SC
- 2023: Al-Shoulla
Medal record
Men's football
Representing Egypt
Africa Cup of Nations
Winner	1986 Egypt
- * Club domestic league appearances and goals

Mohamed Salah (Arabic: محمد صلاح; born 19 June 1958) is an Egyptian former footballer and head coach. He spent his whole football career with Zamalek. He also played for the Egypt national football team, and was a part of the team that won the 1986 African Cup of Nations.

== Playing career ==
Playing in his youth in Zamalek, Salah played for the first team in 1975. At the prime of his career, he played alongside great players such as Taha Basry, Hassan Shehata, Ali Khalil and Farouk Gaafar.

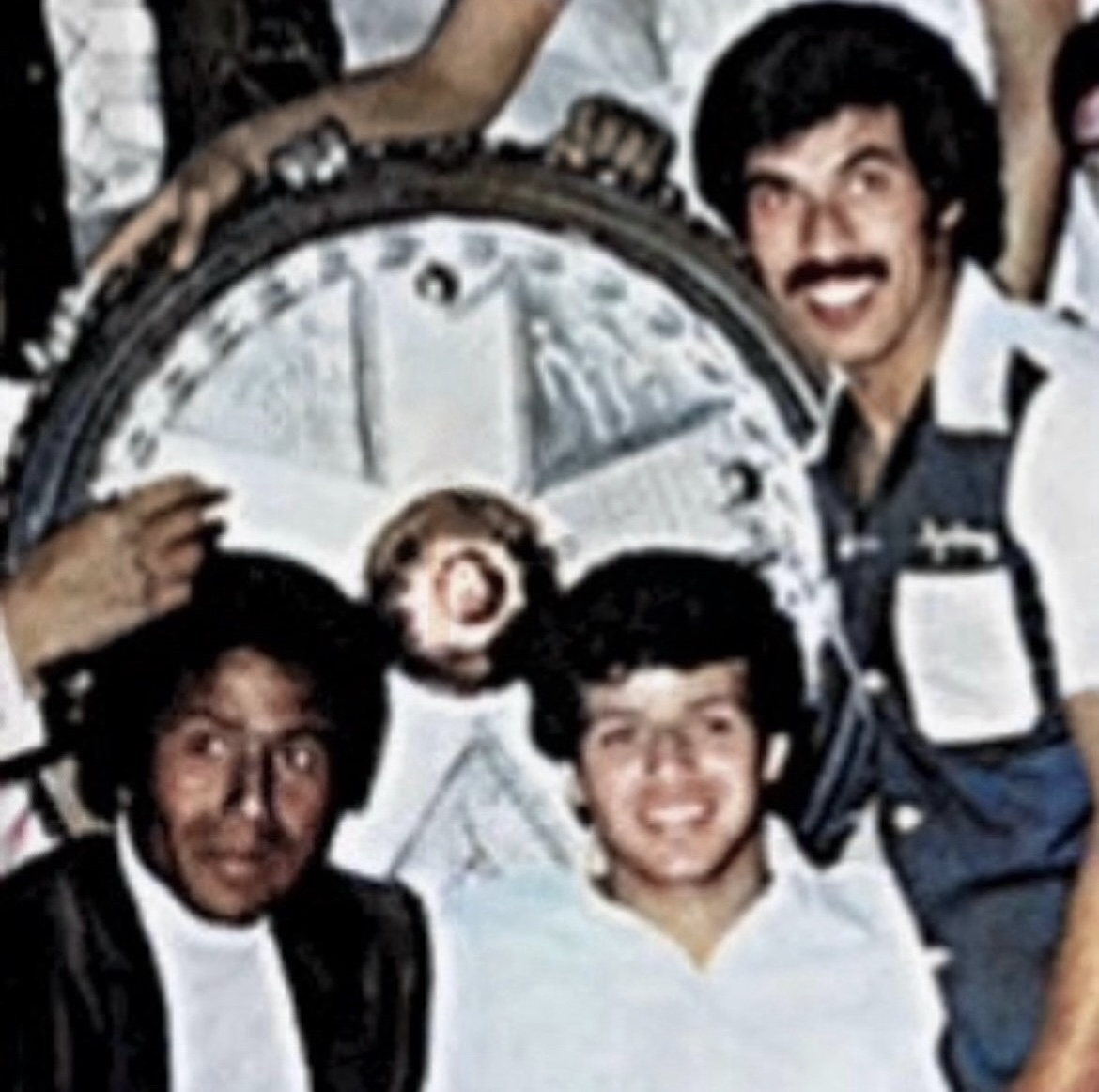
Zamalek players; Salah (middle), Hassan Shehata and Taha Basry with the Egyptian Premier League trophy in 1978

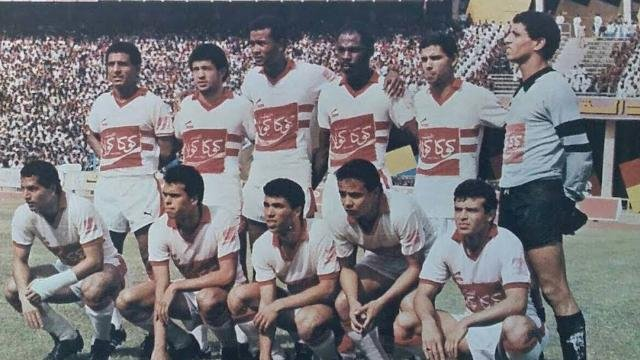
Salah (first sitting from right) with Zamalek in 1984

Salah spent his entire professional career with the Zamalek. He won with Zamalek the Egyptian Premier League for three times in (1977–78, 1983–84, 1987–88), and three titles of the Egypt Cup in (1977, 1979, 1988). He also won the Egyptian Friendship Cup once in 1986. At the continental level, he won the African Cup of Champions Clubs twice in (1984, 1986), and the Afro-Asian Club Championship in 1987.

With Egypt he played in three Africa Cup of Nations tournaments, in his first appearance in the 1980 edition, he was included in the Africa Cup of Nations Dream Team, where Egypt finished fourth, the same place as the 1984 edition which Salah was present in the starting lineup. He was part of the team that won the 1986 African Cup of Nations title.

== Managerial career ==
=== Early Managerial Career ===
He began his journey in football management with Maaden, where he served from 1999 to 2001. This initial experience laid the foundation for his future roles. Following his tenure at Maaden, he took the helm at Baladyet El Mahalla for the 2001–2002 season and then moved to manage Goldi in 2002.

=== Progression Through Egyptian Clubs ===
Continuing his career, he coached Ghazl El Mahalla between 2003 and 2004. After this, he briefly led Ittihad El Iskandary in 2004. His next appointment was with El Masry, where he managed the team from 2005 to 2006. He subsequently took charge at Tanta for the 2006–2007 season and returned to Ittihad El Iskandary for the 2007–2008 campaign.

=== Further Appointments and Short-Term Roles ===
In 2008, he had short spells with both Baladyet El Mahalla and El Tersana. He was then appointed as manager of El Mansoura SC from 2009 to 2010, followed by a period at El Telefonat in 2010–2011.

=== International Experience and Return to Egypt ===
His managerial career then extended to Saudi Arabia, where he led Al-Shoulla in 2011. He returned to the region in 2013 to manage Wehda Mecca, remaining there until 2014. Roles at Zamalek and Further Positions He joined Zamalek in various capacities between 2014 and 2016, undertaking several roles including assistant coach, managing director, first-team manager, and caretaker manager. His versatility and reliability were evident through the club’s trust in him for multiple positions.

=== Later career ===
After his time at Zamalek, he managed Haras El Hodoud in 2017 and again served as caretaker at Zamalek in the same year. He continued his career with Nogoom El Mostakbal from 2017 to 2018, Pharco in 2018, FC Masr from 2018 to 2019, Suez SC in 2019, and Al Tarsana SC from 2019 to 2020. His subsequent appointments included Nogoom FC and Tanta SC in 2020, underlining a long and varied career across numerous Egyptian and Saudi clubs.

=== Al-Shoulla ===
Salah was appointed manager of the Saudi club Al-Shoulla in June 2011. He made a big impact after winning the Saudi First Division with Al-Shoulla in the 2011–12 season. He then lead Al-Shoulla to 3 wins and 4 losses in the 2012–13 Saudi Premier League season. He then went back to Egypt and had an agreement with Almokaweleen.

On 21 February 2023, Salah returned to manage Al-Shoulla 11 years after his first stint at the club.

== Managerial statistics ==
As of match played 31 August 2020

Managerial record by team and tenure
Team	From	To	Record					Ref.
Team	From	To	P	W	D	L	Win %	Ref.
Goldi SC	1 July 1999	9 April 2001	49	16	17	16	32.7	
Baladeyet El Mahalla SC	1 July 2001	1 January 2002	13	3	5	5	23.1	
Goldi SC	1 January 2002	21 October 2002	18	6	3	9	33.3	
Ghazl El Mahalla SC	1 July 2003	11 June 2004	25	11	7	7	44.0	
Al Ittihad Alexandria	10 January 2004	23 December 2004	37	15	7	15	40.5	
Al Masry SC	30 November 2005	30 June 2006	19	8	4	7	42.1	
Tanta SC	25 August 2006	30 June 2007	29	6	11	12	20.7	
Al Ittihad Alexandria	2 September 2007	1 January 2008	12	2	4	6	16.7	
Baladeyet El Mahalla SC	10 January 2008	30 June 2008	15	2	6	7	13.3	
Al Tarsana SC	1 July 2008	3 November 2008	13	5	1	7	38.5	
El Mansoura SC	12 December 2009	7 January 2010	4	1	1	2	25.0	
Telephonat Beni Suef SC	1 February 2010	17 August 2011	18	8	6	4	44.4	
Al-Shoulla FC	1 December 2011	30 December 2011	6	3	1	2	50.0	
Al-Wehda	1 October 2013	28 February 2014	23	11	7	5	47.8	
Zamalek SC	1 January 2015	10 February 2015	7	5	2	0	71.4	
FC Masr	22 September 2015	30 December 2015	9	5	2	2	55.6	
Zamalek SC (Caretaker)	10 February 2016	23 February 2016	3	2	1	0	66.7	
Zamalek SC (Caretaker)	19 November 2016	29 November 2016	3	1	2	0	33.3	
Haras El Hodoud SC	7 January 2017	4 April 2017	17	10	5	2	58.8	
Zamalek SC (Caretaker)	4 April 2017	6 April 2017	1	0	0	1	0.0	
Nogoom FC	1 July 2017	22 May 2018	33	19	10	4	57.6	
Pharco FC	1 July 2018	11 October 2018	11	5	4	2	45.5	
FC Masr	13 October 2018	5 August 2019	21	13	7	1	61.9	
Suez SC	6 October 2019	3 December 2019	8	4	2	2	50.0	
Al Tarsana SC	4 December 2019	19 February 2020	10	3	4	3	30.0	
Nogoom FC	19 February 2020	12 August 2020	2	0	0	2	0.0	
Tanta SC	12 August 2020	31 August 2020	4	0	0	4	0.0	
Al-Shoulla	21 February 2023	29 May 2023	12	3	3	6	25.0	
Total			422	167	122	133	39.6	—

== Honours ==
=== Player ===
==== Zamalek ====
- Egyptian Premier League: 1977–78, 1983–84, 1987–88
- Egypt Cup: 1977, 1979, 1988
- Egyptian Friendship Cup: 1986
- CAF Champions League: 1984, 1986
- Afro-Asian Club Championship: 1987

==== Egypt ====
- African Cup of Nations: 1986

==== Individual ====
- Africa Cup of Nations Dream Team: 1980

=== Manager ===
==== Maaden ====
- Egyptian Second Division

==== Al-Shoulla ====
- Saudi First Division: 2011–12

==== Nogoom El Mostakbal ====
- Egyptian Second Division: 2017–18
