= Adel El-Maamour =

Egyptian footballer (born 1955)

Adel El Maamour
Personal information
- Date of birth: 11 November 1955 (age 70)
- Place of birth: Egypt
- Position: Goalkeeper

Senior career*
Years	Team	Apps	(Gls)
1973–1975	Cairo's Water company club	-	(-)
1975–1988	Zamalek SC	-	(-)

International career
1977–1985	Egypt	9	(0)
- * Club domestic league appearances and goals

Adel El Maamour (Arabic: عادل المأمور, born 11 November 1955) is an Egyptian football goalkeeper who played for Egypt in the 1984 Summer Olympics, He also played for Zamalek. He represented Egypt in the 1980 African Cup of Nations and 1984 Summer Olympics.

== Honours ==
=== Club ===
==== Zamalek ====
- Egyptian Premier League: 1977–78, 1983–84, 1987–88
- Egypt Cup: 1975, 1977, 1979, 1988
- Egyptian Friendship Cup: 1986
- CAF Champions League: 1984, 1986
- Afro-Asian Club Championship: 1987
