= Reda Abdel Aal =

Egyptian football manager (born 1965)

Personal information
- Full name: Reda Mohamed Abdel Aal Sultan
- Date of birth: 15 March 1965 (age 61)
- Place of birth: Qalyubia, Egypt
- Height: 1.66 m (5 ft 5 in)
- Position: Midfielder

Youth career
- Nile Lel Adwiah

Senior career*
Years	Team	Apps	(Gls)
1984–1987	Nile Lel Adwiah		
1987–1993	Zamalek	164	(4)
1993–1998	Al Ahly	168	(8)
1999–2000	El Qanah	26	(0)

International career
1988–1996	Egypt	14	(1)

Managerial career
- 2001–2002: Bahtem SC
- 2002: Olympic Club
- 2002–2003: Nile Sohag
- 2004: Nile Sohag
- 2006–2007: Beni Ebeid
- 2007–2008: Al Zarka
- 2008: Ittihad Nabarouh
- 2009: Ala'ab Damanhour
- 2009–2010: Ittihad Nabarouh
- 2010–2014: Tanta
- 2014–2015: El Entag El Harby
- 2016: Gomhoriat Shebin
- 2016–2017: Ala'ab Damanhour
- 2017: Ittihad Nabarouh
- 2019–2020: Baladeyet El Mahalla
- 2020–2021: Tanta
- * Club domestic league appearances and goals

Reda Abdel Aal (Arabic: رضا عبد العال; born 15 March 1965) is an Egyptian football manager and former player who last managed Tanta.

== International career ==
Reda was a member of Egypt national team in 1994 African Nations Cup. He made some appearances with the team in 1994 FIFA World Cup qualification matches.

== Managerial statistics ==
As of match played 23 December 2020

Managerial record by team and tenure
Team	From	To	Record					Ref.
Team	From	To	P	W	D	L	Win %	Ref.
Ittihad Nabarouh SC	1 October 2009	18 May 2010	31	11	9	11	35.5	
Tanta	4 June 2010	3 July 2014	66	34	19	13	51.5	
El Entag El Harby	3 July 2014	8 February 2015	19	6	9	4	31.6	
Gomhoriat Shebin	12 May 2016	8 November 2016	5	0	4	1	0.0	
Ala'ab Damanhour	12 December 2016	15 February 2017	11	4	5	2	36.4	
Ittihad Nabarouh	13 June 2017	6 October 2017	4	1	0	3	25.0	
Al Baladeyet	17 November 2019	23 January 2020	9	4	3	2	44.4	
Tanta	15 September 2020	17 February 2021	11	2	4	5	18.2	
Total			161	63	53	45	39.1	—

== Honours ==
=== Player ===
Zamalek

- Egyptian Premier League: 1987-88, 1991-92, 1992-93
- Egypt Cup: 1988
- Egyptian Friendship Cup: 1986
- African Cup of Champions Clubs: 1984, 1986
- Afro-Asian Club Championship: 1987
