= Tarek Yehia =

Egyptian football manager (born 1961)

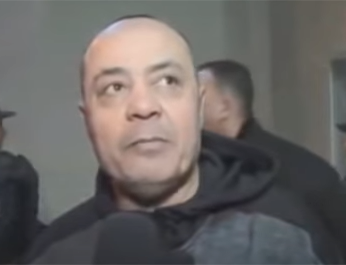
- Yehia in 2019

Personal information
- Full name: Tarek Mohamed Yehia Abdel Hamid
- Date of birth: 10 September 1961 (age 65)
- Place of birth: Kafr el-Sheikh, Egypt
- Height: 1.75 m (5 ft 9 in)
- Position: Winger

Senior career*
Years	Team	Apps	(Gls)
1981–1992	Zamalek SC	+300	(89)
1992–1994	Nejmeh SC		

Managerial career
- 2000–2001: El Sharkia
- 2002–2003: Zamalek (assistant)
- 2003–2004: Nabarouh
- 2004–2005: Tanta FC
- 2006–2008: Itesalat
- 2008–2008: Al-Wahda (youth)
- 2008–2008: Zamalek (assistant)
- 2008–2009: Suez Cement
- 2009–2010: El-Entag El-Harby
- 2010–2012: Misr Lel-Makkasa
- 2012–2013: Hajer Club
- 2013–2014: Misr Lel-Makkasa
- 2014–2014: Al-Masry SC
- 2015–2015: Ismaily SC
- 2015–2016: Tala'ea El-Gaish SC
- 2016–2016: El Sharkia
- 2017–2017: Tala'ea El-Gaish SC
- 2017–2017: Zamalek (caretaker)
- 2017–2017: Zamalek (assistant)
- 2017–2018: Petrojet
- 2018–2019: Smouha SC
- 2019–2019: Zamalek (caretaker)
- 2019–2020: Tala'ea El-Gaish SC
- 2020: Zamalek (caretaker)
- * Club domestic league appearances and goals

Tarek Mohamed Yehia Abdel Hamid (Arabic: طارق محمد يحيي عبد الحميد; born 10 September 1961) is an Egyptian former football player and Zamalek former international left winger. He worked as caretaker at Zamalek for many terms.

== Playing career ==
=== Early career ===
Yehia was born in Kafr el-Sheikh. He started his career as a footballer when he was 19. Luck played a big role as Zamalek went to Kafr el-Sheikh to play a friendly match with Zamalek-kelen. Fortunately, he played this match and scored 2 goals in Zamalek. The coach at this time was Mr. Micheal Everts, who was very amused by the young player's performance. Eventually, the transition was made by Zamalek under supervision of captain Ahmad Mustafa and the 19-year-old player signed for Zamalek.

He did not have any idea, that he was going to be one of the greatest players in the club's history. At first, he started by playing for the U-21 team at Zamalek and made a stunning performance, which eventually led him to the first team. The match which introduced the left wing as a fan idol was against Esco, as Zamalek won by half a dozen goals; his share from it was a hat-trick. He then reserved a place in Zamalek's starting 11 instead of a reserve, which was the first step on the way of glory with his club.

=== Zamalek ===
In his career he brought to Zamalek 8 titles: 4 Egyptian Premier League, 1 Egypt Cup, 2 African Champions League, and 1 Afro-Asian Cup. Specialized in African Club cups, he scored 10 Goals for Zamalek in African matches only.

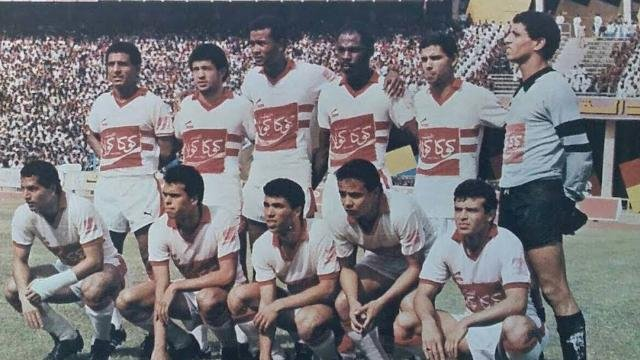
Yehia (lower row, second from right) with Zamalek in 1984

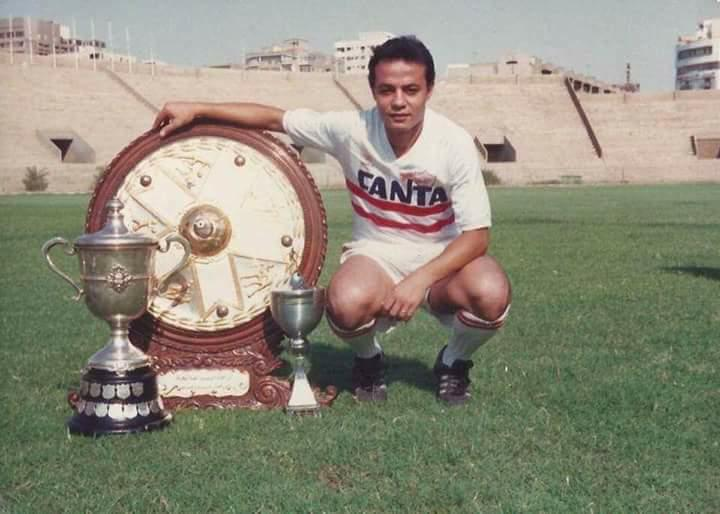
Tarek Yehia

Also, he scored one of the greatest goals in Egyptian football history against Al Ahly as he passed two Central backs as well as the goalkeeper and tore the nets of the red devils with one of the best goals ever recorded in Egyptian football. He set the record as the 2nd best scorer in Zamalek history with 99 goals after Gamal Abdelhamid. Yehia scored 78 goal in the Egyptian league (3 of them in Al Ahli club) and 11 goals in Egyptian Cup and 10 goals in African contests.

=== National team ===
His History with the Egyptian football team is also great, as he contributed with his efforts in winning the bronze medal in the Mediterranean sea Championship 1983 and also the 1986 African Cup of Nations. He played in the 1988 and 1990 African Cup of Nations. He played for Egypt in the 1986 FIFA World Cup qualifying rounds.

== Coaching career ==
=== Early career ===
The young coach started as an assistant coach under Essam Baheeg for Suez canal club Al-kanah in 1994 which won the FA cup which replaced in this year the Egyptian cup title. then he moved with Baheeg to Dina Farms in 1996 as the team scored his best ever ranking in Egyptian Premier League (5th position) In addition, he trained Zamalek in 2002-2003 season under the Brazilian Carlos Roberto Cabral and won 1 African champions league title and 1 Egyptian super cup before resigning from the team as he wanted to start his sole coaching career.

=== Tanta ===
He became the coach of Tanta in the Egyptian Second Division, which he was about to promote it to the Premier League but he failed. The team played a decisive game with Koroum and lost 1-0.

=== Itesalat ===
He then accepted an offer from Itesalat (aka Telecom Egypt), which was a challenge for him as the goal of the newly founded team (1974) and the chairman was to promote the team to the Egyptian Premier League. He achieved the goal by promoting them in addition to setting many records which included best defence, attack and best scorer in Second Division.

Then, Yehia became the Assistant Coach for Zamalek once more. He accepted the challenge after the resignation of Mohammed Helmy, and he started his job under the lead of the German coach Reiner Hollmann.

=== El-Entag El-Harby ===
In preparation for its premier league campaign, El-Entag El-Harby (aka Military Production) appointed Tarek Yehia as the new manager. The team had recently won promotion to the Egyptian Premier League in the 2008–09 Egyptian Second Division for its first time with the previous coaching staff. Yehia quickly looked for the option of signing experienced Egyptian players that could lead the team to prevent relegation. He signed players such as Mohamed Aboul Ela (Zamalek former captain), Mostafa Kamal (Veteran Goal Keeper), Hassan Mousa, and others.

Tarek Yehia enjoyed great success with his team. He managed to lead the team to 4th place by the end of the first round of 2009–10 Egyptian Premier League. However, El-Entag El-Harby's form slightly fell to finish 7th by the end of the season.

Despite the great success with El-Entag El-Harby, Yehia's era at the club lasted for only that season. He preferred to move to newly promoted Misr El-Maqasha. Osama Orabi replaced him at El-Entag El-Harby.

== Managerial statistics ==
As of match played 27 September 2020

Managerial record by team and tenure
Team	From	To	Record					Ref.
Team	From	To	P	W	D	L	Win %	Ref.
El Entag El Harby SC	5 May 2009	6 June 2010	34	13	9	12	38.2	
Misr Lel Makkasa SC	6 June 2010	3 October 2012	49	17	22	10	34.7	
Hajer FC	19 October 2012	28 April 2013	17	2	3	12	11.8	
Misr Lel Makkasa SC	27 May 2013	13 July 2014	23	5	11	7	21.7	
Al Masry SC	14 July 2014	16 December 2014	13	5	2	6	38.5	
Ismaily SC	7 February 2015	12 July 2015	18	6	8	4	33.3	
Tala'ea El-Gaish SC	7 February 2015	12 July 2015	37	10	15	12	27.0	
El Sharkia SC	29 July 2016	4 November 2016	8	1	1	6	12.5	
Tala'ea El-Gaish SC	11 January 2017	5 May 2017	12	3	3	6	25.0	
Zamalek SC	19 July 2017	28 August 2017	4	1	1	2	25.0	
Petrojet SC	31 December 2017	6 November 2018	33	9	13	11	27.3	
Smouha SC	14 November 2018	16 January 2019	7	0	4	3	0.0	
Zamalek SC (Caretaker)	3 August 2019	16 August 2019	1	1	0	0	100.0	
Tala'ea El-Gaish SC	12 November 2019	20 January 2020	12	3	3	6	25.0	
Zamalek SC (Caretaker)	16 September 2020	27 September 2020	3	2	0	1	66.7	
Total			271	78	95	98	28.8	—

== Honours ==
=== Player ===
Zamalek

- Egyptian Premier League: 1983-84, 1987-88, 1991-92
- Egypt Cup: 1987–88
- Egyptian Friendship Cup: 1986
- African Cup of Champions Clubs: 1984, 1986
- Afro-Asian Club Championship: 1987

Egypt

- Africa Cup of Nations: 1986
- African Games Bronze: 1983

=== Coach ===
Zamalek

- Egyptian Super Cup: 2002 (Assistant coach)
- CAF Champions League: 2002 (Assistant coach)
