= Mohamed Helmy =

Egyptian footballer (born 1962)

Personal information
- Date of birth: 29 October 1962 (age 64)
- Place of birth: Diyarb Negm, Sharkia, Egypt
- Position: Forward

Senior career*
Years	Team	Apps	(Gls)
1978–1991	Zamalek		
1991–1994	Suez club		

International career
- Egypt

Managerial career
- 2000–2001: Nabaroh
- 2001–2002: Sinbelaween
- 2002–2003: Itesalat
- 2004–2006: Telephonat Beni Suef
- 2006–2008: Baladeyet El-Mahalla
- 2008: Zamalek (assistant)
- 2008–2009: El-Olympi
- 2009: Mansoura
- 2010: Al-Masry
- 2010: Itesalat
- 2012: El-Entag El-Harby
- 2012–2013: Ittihad El Shorta
- 2013–2014: ENPPI
- 2016: Zamalek (assistant)
- 2016: Zamalek
- 2016–2017: Zamalek
- 2018–2019: Tala'ea El Gaish
- * Club domestic league appearances and goals

Mohamed Helmy (born 29 October 1962) is an Egyptian football manager and former player who spent the majority of his playing career with Zamalek. He is Zamalek's Head of Junior Sector. He also competed with Egypt in the men's tournament at the 1984 Summer Olympics.

== Career ==
Helmy is a former forward, and most recently coach of Zamalek, a post from which he resigned in 2016 following successive Champions League defeats to South Africa's Mamelodi Sundowns. He also played for the Egypt national team, and was instrumental in helping Zamalek win the Egyptian Cup on 25 May 2008.

== Honours ==
=== Player ===
Zamalek

- Egyptian Premier League: 2
  1983–84, 1987–88
- Egypt Cup: 2
  1979, 1988
- Egyptian Friendship Cup: 1
  1986
- African Cup of Champions Clubs: 2
  1984, 1986
- Afro-Asian Club Championship: 1
  1987

=== Manager ===
Zamalek

- Egypt Cup: 1
  2008 (Assistant)
- Egyptian Super Cup: 1
  2017
