= Ayman Younes =

Egyptian footballer (born 1964)

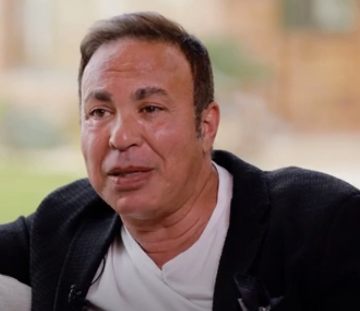

Personal information
- Date of birth: 20 February 1964 (age 62)
- Place of birth: Cairo, Egypt
- Positions: Midfielder; forward

Senior career*
Years	Team	Apps	(Gls)
1983–1993	Zamalek		
1993–1994	Al Wehda		

International career
1985-1990	Egypt	26	(5)
Medal record
Men's football
Representing Egypt
African Games
Gold medal – first place	1987 Nairobi
- * Club domestic league appearances and goals

Ayman Younes (Arabic: أيمن يونس; born 20 February 1964) is an Egyptian sports executive and a retired footballer who played as a midfielder and forward. He played for Zamalek and the Egypt national team. Nicknamed the "Philosopher", he was a talented midfielder with great pace and attacking ability. He was a part of the team that won the gold medal at the 1987 All-Africa Games. Younes was a key player for Zamalek and Egypt in the 1980s. He scored the fastest goal in Egyptian Premier League in 1990 against Suez SC after 13 seconds.

He retired from professional football in 1994. After retirement, he was elected as Zamalek's board member for more than a period, he was also elected as a board member of the Egyptian Football Association. He currently works as football analyst at the ON Time Sports channel.

== Club career ==
Ayman Younes started his career in 1980 with Zamalek. He is the only one who officially participated in 11 positions on the pitch in various matches, whether with the national team or Zamalek, despite his participation mainly in the midfield position, but he occupied all positions inside the field, including goalkeeping in an incident. He is famous when he participated as a goalkeeper against Tersana in the league match in the 1987–88 season for a full 40 minutes of the match after the main goalkeeper was injured. He is also considered the scorer of one of the fastest goals in the history of the Egyptian Premier League after he scored it in the 11th second of the Zamalek match against the Suez SC.

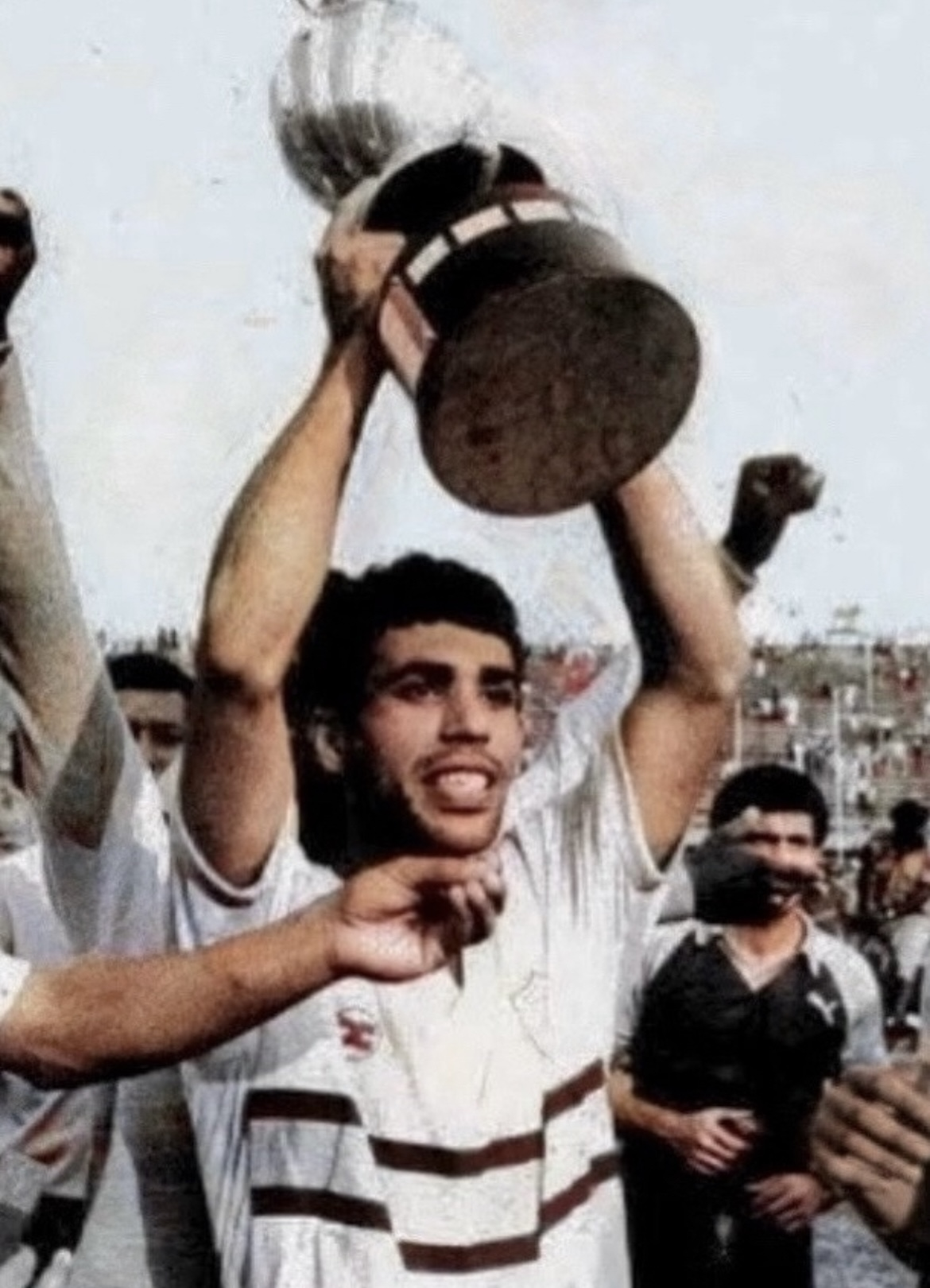
Younes lifting the African Cup of Champions Clubs trophy in 1984

Younes won several titles with Zamalek during his football career, and won the League for 4 times in the years (1983–84, 1987–88, 1991–92, 1992–93). He also won the Egypt Cup in 1988 and the CAF Champions League titles (1984, 1986), as well as the Afro-Asian Club Championship in the year in 1987. He scored a famous goal in the Cairo derby in 1990.

Taha Ismail, the former Al Ahly forward, said about Ayman Younes: "He made analysis a sophisticated philosophical art with a different imagination, and possessed a linguistic dictionary and a diverse culture that was exciting for viewers".

== International career ==
Ayman Younes participated in the 1987 African Games in Nairobi and scored the winning goal against Senegal in the group stage, Egypt won the gold medal. He also played in the 1988 Africa Cup of Nations in Morocco and scored two goals against the Cameroon and Senegal.

Mike Smith, the former coach of the Egypt national team, called Ayman Younes "the philosopher", stressing that he has a liberal philosophical style for moving between the lines of the field and shifting to attack in a terrifying way to any defense, and he said that he is a unique player of his kind.

== Post-football career ==
After retirement, he moved into the field of football analysis through several television channels beginning in 1996. He was distinguished by his strong and profound opinions, earning him the title of philosopher due to his ability. I have to deliver information in a unique way.

Younes held many administrative positions in Zamalek as well as the Egyptian Football Association, where he assumed the position of a member of the Board of Directors in Zamalek in the years 2013 - 2014, and participated as a member of the Egyptian Football Association Council during the period from 2004 to 2012, during which the team won 3 African Cup Nations under the leadership of the head coach Hassan Shehata.

== Honours ==
Zamalek

- Egyptian Premier League: 1983–84, 1987–88, 1991–92, 1992–93
- Egypt Cup: 1988
- Egyptian Friendship Cup: 1986
- African Cup of Champions Clubs: 1984, 1986
- Afro-Asian Club Championship: 1987

Egypt

- African Games: 1987
