= 1984 African Cup of Champions Clubs final =

1984 African Champions Cup final
- Event: 1984 African Cup of Champions Clubs
Zamalek	Shooting Stars
(Egypt)	(Nigeria)
3	0
- Zamalek won 3–0 on aggregate

First leg
Zamalek	Shooting Stars
2	0
- Date: 23 November 1984
- Venue: Cairo Stadium, Cairo
- Referee: J F Diamba (Gabon)

Second leg
Shooting Stars	Zamalek
0	1
- Date: 8 December 1984
- Venue: Surulere Stadium, Lagos
- Attendance: 90,000

The 1984 African Cup of Champions Clubs final was a football tie held over two legs in November and December 1984 between Zamalek, and Shooting Stars.

Zamalek from Egypt won the final's two legs, with a score on aggregate 3–0, earning their 1st African Cup.

The day after the 2nd leg, Shooting Stars FC were disbanded by the government for "putting shame on Nigeria".

== Match details ==
=== First leg ===
23 November 1984

Zamalek (Egypt)	2–0	(Nigeria) Shooting Stars
Abd El-Hamid 60', 70' (pen.)

Cairo Stadium, Cairo
Referee: Jean-Fidèle Diramba (Gabon)

Zamalek	Shooting Stars

Zamalek:
GK	(Egypt) Adel El-Maamour
CB	2	(Egypt) Mohamed Salah
CB	(Egypt) Ibrahim Youssef
LB	(Egypt) Said El-Godaii (substituted off) ?'
CM	(Egypt) Hesham Yakan
CM	(Egypt) Ayman Younes
RW	(Egypt) Farouk Gaafar (c)
AM	(Egypt) Magdy Tolba (substituted off) ?'
AM	(Egypt) Nasr Ibrahim
FW	(Ghana) Emmanuel Quarshie
FW	9	(Egypt) Gamal Abdel Hamid
Substitutions:
(Egypt) Gamal Abdullah	(substituted on) ?'
(Egypt) Adel Abdel Wahed	(substituted on) ?'
Manager:
(Egypt) Mahmoud Abou-Regaila

Shooting Stars:
GK	(Nigeria) Raymond King
CB	(Nigeria) Fawole Obeng
CB
CB
RM
CM
CM	(Nigeria) Ademola Adeshina
LM	(Nigeria) Felix Owolabi
CM	(Nigeria) Mudashiru Lawal
CF	(Nigeria) Segun Odegbami
CF	(Nigeria) Rashidi Yekini
Substitutes:
Manager:
(Nigeria) Festus Onigbinde

=== Second leg ===
8 December 1984
14:45

Shooting Stars (Nigeria)	0–1	(Egypt) Zamalek
		Obeng 56' (o.g.)

Surulere Stadium, Lagos
Attendance: 90,000

Shooting Stars	Zamalek

== Notes and references ==
- African Club Competitions 1984
