= Ibrahim Youssef =

Egyptian footballer (1959–2013)

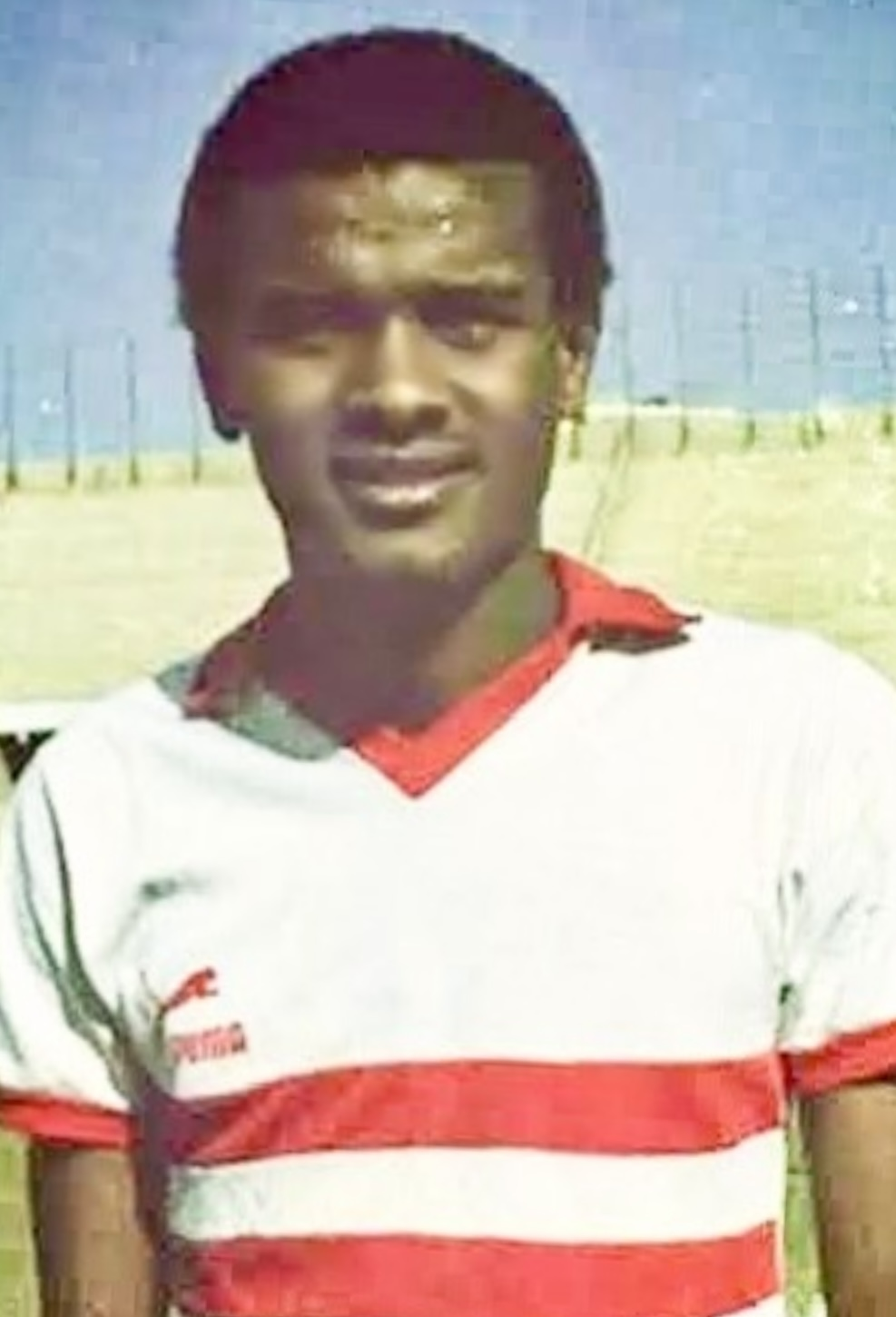
- Youssef with Zamalek SC in 1979

Personal information
- Full name: Ibrahim Youssef Awadallah Mohamed
- Date of birth: 1 January 1959
- Place of birth: Imbaba, Giza, Egypt
- Date of death: 10 July 2013 (aged 54)
- Place of death: Cairo, Egypt
- Position: Defender

Youth career
- Zamalek

Senior career*
Years	Team	Apps	(Gls)
1975-1988	Zamalek		

International career
1976–1988	Egypt	57	(4)
Medal record
Men's football
Representing Egypt
Mediterranean Games
Bronze medal – third place	1983 Casablanca
African Games
Gold medal – first place	1987 Nairobi
- * Club domestic league appearances and goals

Ibrahim Youssef Awadallah Mohamed (Arabic: إبراهيم يوسف عوض الله محمد; 1 January 1959 – 10 July 2013), nicknamed "Black Deer الغزال الاسمر", was an Egyptian football executive, former football player and police officer. He spent all of his football career with Zamalek. He also played for the Egypt national football team. Youssef won the Egyptian footballer of the year for several times. He was chosen the best Libero in 1984 African Cup of Nations. He finished 2nd in the African footballer of the year by France Football in 1984, and 3rd in 1985.

He is considered the best Libero in Egypt's history. Youssef is included in MasterCard African Team of the 20th Century in 1998. After his retirement from football in 1988, he worked in sports management. He was elected as Zamalek's board member for several periods.

== Early life ==
Ibrahim Youssef was born in the Imbaba, Giza on 1 January 1959. He comes from a football family, as he is the younger brother of footballer El-Sayed, and the elder brother of footballer Ismail.

== Career ==
=== Club career ===
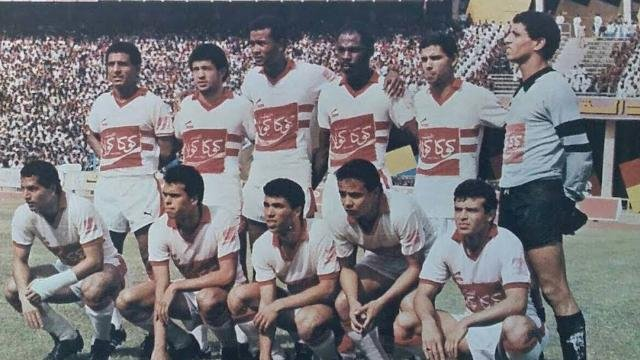
Youssef (third standing from left) with Zamalek in 1984

Youssef started his career in Zamalek, which he played for throughout his entire career. He played for 13 years in Zamalek, he won the Egyptian Premier League for three times in (1977–78, 1983–84, 1987–88) seasons.

He also won with Zamalek the Egypt Cup for three times (1977, 1979, 1988). On the continental level, he won with Zamalek the CAF Champions League twice in (1984, 1986), as well as the Afro-Asian Club Championship in (1987).

=== International career ===
Youssef was called to the Egypt national football team for the 1976, 1980 and the 1984 African Cup of Nations. He also played for Egypt at the 1984 Summer Olympics in Los Angeles. In the 1986 African Cup of Nations, he was injured and did not play. Youssef played for Egypt in the 1983 Mediterranean Games, where his team won a bronze medal, and the 1984 African Cup of Nations, where Egypt finished in the fourth place. He won the gold medal with Egypt at the 1987 African Games.

=== Post-football career ===
Besides his career as a police officer in the Egyptian National Police, after his retirement from football in an early age due to his injury, Youssef coached the Egypt national under-17 football team and Zamalek for a brief period. Later, he worked in football management and became Zamalek's board member for more than a period.

== Death ==
Youssef died of a sudden heart attack at the age of 54 on 10 July 2013 in Cairo. A military funeral service was held, attended by officers of the Ministry of Interior and the Police Sports Association, of which Youssef was a member, as well as his family and colleagues.

== Honours ==
Zamalek

- Egyptian Premier League: 1977–78, 1983–84, 1987–88
- Egypt Cup: 1976–77, 1978–79, 1987–88
- Egyptian Friendship Cup: 1986
- CAF Champions League: 1984, 1986
- Afro-Asian Club Championship: 1987

Egypt

- African Games: 1987

Individual

- Best Egyptian footballer several times
- Best Libero in Africa Cup of Nations: 1984
- 2nd place - African footballer of the year by France Football: 1984
- 3rd place - African footballer of the year by France Football: 1985
- Considered the best Libero in Egypt's history
- MasterCard African Team of the 20th Century: 1998
