= Gamal Abdel-Hamid =

Egyptian footballer (born 1957)

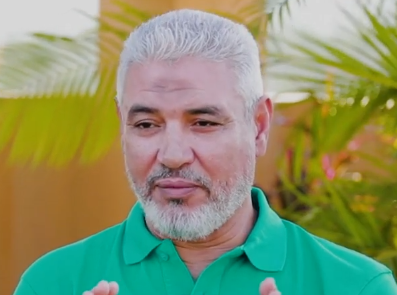
- Abdel-Hamid in 2020

Personal information
- Date of birth: 24 November 1957 (age 68)
- Place of birth: Cairo, Egypt
- Height: 1.71 m (5 ft 7 in)
- Position: Forward

Senior career*
Years	Team	Apps	(Gls)
1977–1983	Al Ahly		(28)
1983–1993	Zamalek	180	(73)

International career
1979–1993	Egypt	79	(24)

Managerial career
- 2003: Al-Hazem
- 2003–2004: Al-Taawoun
Medal record
Men's football
Representing Egypt
Africa Cup of Nations
Gold medal – first place	1986 Egypt
African Games
Gold medal – first place	1987 Nairobi
- * Club domestic league appearances and goals

Gamal Abdel-Hamid (Arabic: جمال عبد الحميد; born 24 November 1957) is an Egyptian football manager and former footballer who played as a forward. He played for Zamalek and the Egypt national football team. He is one of the all-time top scorers of the Egyptian Premier League. He is regarded as one of the best forwards in the history of African football. Abdel-Hamid was a part of the team that won the 1986 African Cup of Nations. He captained Egypt at the 1990 World Cup.

He started his professional career in Al Ahly, however, after his injury, he signed for Zamalek in a highly publicized move in 1983. He spent the rest of his career with in the White Castle. After his retirement, he was elected as Zamalek's board member for more than a period. He also works as a football analyst in Egyptian sports channels.

== Club career ==
=== Al-Ahly ===
Gamal Abdel-Hamid began his career by playing for the Ain El-Sira Youth Center, afterwards, he took tests at the 54 El-Harby Club in 1976, and was picked up by Chico and presented to Captain Awadin, Al Ahly's Youth coach.

He began his professional career with Al Ahly on April 24, 1977, when he replaced Al-Ahly striker Mahmoud El-Khatib at the beginning of the second half against El-Sekka El-Hadid in the 26th week of the Egyptian Premier League, and scored his first goal only 23 minutes after his participation, scoring the third and final goal for Al Ahly in the match against Ahmed. Before. Abdel-Hamid scored his last goal for Al Ahly, against El-Salergani, Isco's goalkeeper, on May 1, 1982, in the 25th round, in the 67th minute, to lead Al-Ahly to a 3-0 victory. His career with Al Ahly continued for 6 years until he suffered a serious injury on October 10, 1982 in a joint match with goalkeeper Ekramy, which completely changed his football path.

His career in Al Ahly witnessed his participation in 110 matches, during which he scored 33 goals, including 28 in the league in 91 matches, 3 goals in 10 matches in the Egypt Cup, and two African goals in 9 matches. With Al-Ahly, he achieved 8 championships in 6 years, including 5 league championships in 1976-77, 1978-79, 1979-80, 1980-81, 1981-82, and two Egypt Cup titles in 1978 and 1981, Al Ahly’s first African championship in 1982, and he was Al-Ahly's top scorer along with El-Khatib in the Egyptian Premier League’s 1978-79 season with 7 goals.

=== Zamalek ===
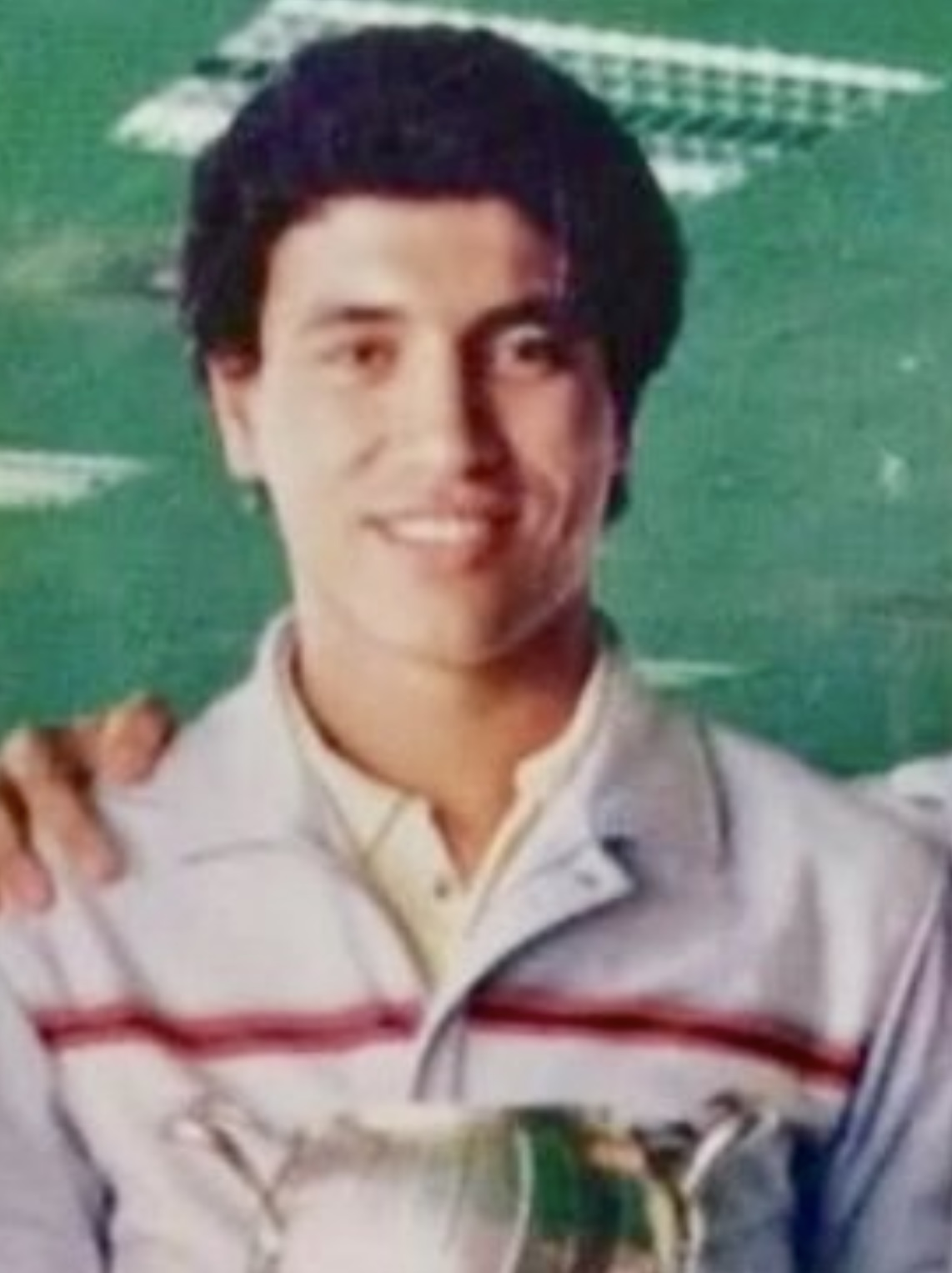
Abdel-Hamid with Zamalek in 1984

Abdel-Hamid missed the 1982-83 season due to injury after Al Ahly released him, and Zamalek coach Ahmed Rifaat picked him up, starting to write a new history for him with his new club over 10 consecutive seasons. He scored 96 goals in Zamalek shirt across 232 matches, succeeding Abdel Halim Ali and Hassan Shehata as Zamalek’s top scorer in the last six decades. Abdel-Hamid scored 73 goals in the Egyptian Premier league, placing him in fourth place on the list of Zamalek’s top scorers, behind Abdel Halim Ali, Ali Khalil, and Hassan Shehata, ahead of Hamada Emam by one goal, his record in 188 matches.

Abdel-Hamid became the fifth player to score 100 goals in the history of the Egyptian league, when he scored a goal against Ismaily in the second round of the 1992-93 season, with 101 goals in 279 league matches, and he came ninth in the list of the all-time top scorers. He scored 7 goals in the Egypt Cup in 12 matches, bringing his number of his goals in domestic competitions to 111 goals in 301 matches with both clubs he played for. Abdel-Hamid also scored 16 African goals in 31 matches, with Zamalek shirt. He also scored a goal in a single participation in the 1987 Afro-Asian Club Championship. Abdel-Hamid achieved 9 titles with Zamalek, including 4 league titles in the seasons; 1983-84, 1987-88, 1991-92, 1992-93. He also won the Egypt Cup once in 1988, and won the CAF Champions League twice in 1984 and 1986, and he achieved the Afro-Asian title in 1987. He won the title of top scorer in the Egyptian Premier league in the 1987-88 season, with 10 goals.

== International career ==
Abdel-Hamid's career with Egypt began in 1979 when Abdel Moneim El-Hag, the national team coach at the time, included him in his ranks to participate in the 1980 Summer Olympics qualifiers. He played his first match against Kenya at Zamalek Stadium, and Egypt won with a score of 3-0.

By 1984, Abdel-Hamid became one of the stars of Egyptian football and participated in winning the 1986 African Cup of Nations. He then became Egypt's captain in the 1987 African Games in Nairobi, and Egypt won the gold medal. He was also joint top-scorer at the 1988 African Cup of Nations, with 2 goals. Abdel-Hamid captained Egypt at the 1990 FIFA World Cup group stage. He scored 24 international goals for his country.

== Post retirement career ==
After Gamal Abdel Hamid retired from football, he headed to training for a short period at Saudi club Al-Hazem in 2003, an Al-Taawoun for the 2003-04 season, both clubs in the Saudi Pro League. Then he moved to the field of sports management and held the position of member of the Board of Directors of Zamalek for more than a period. He also works as a football analyst in television for Egyptian sports channels.

== Honours ==
=== Club ===
Ahly

- Egyptian League: 1978-79, 1979-80, 1980-81, 1981-82
- Egypt Cup: 1977-78, 1980-81, 1982-83
- CAF Champions League: 1982

Zamalek

- Egyptian League: 1983-84, 1987-88, 1991-92, 1992-93
- Egypt Cup: 1987-88
- Egyptian Friendship Cup: 1986
- CAF Champions League: 1984, 1986
- Afro-Asian Club Championship: 1987

=== International ===
Egypt

- Africa Cup of Nations: 1986
- African Games Gold Medal: 1987

=== Individual ===
- CAF Champions League Top Scorer: 1986
- Africa Cup Of Nations Top Scorer: 1988
- Egyptian League Top Scorer: 1987–88
- Captain of Egypt in 1990 FIFA World Cup
- Scored 101 goals in Egyptian league
- Scored 18 Goals in African Club Cups (16 goals for Zamalek and 2 goals for Ahly)

== See also ==
- Football in Egypt
