= Effat Nssar =

Egyptian footballer and coach (born 1964)

Personal information
- Full name: Effat Sayed Nassar
- Date of birth: 21 July 1964 (age 62)
- Place of birth: Cairo, Egypt
- Position: Left midfielder

Senior career*
Years	Team	Apps	(Gls)
1986–1996	Zamalek		
1996	Al-Raed		
1997	Al-Wehda Club		
1997–1999	Masry		
2000	Siirtspor		

International career
?	Egypt	4	

Managerial career
- 2007: Ala'ab Damanhour
- 2008–2010: Baladeyet Mahalla
- 2010: Al Hammam
- 2010: Meyah El Behira
- 2011: El Sharkia
- 2013–2014: YC Kom Hamada
- 2014–2015: Gomhoria Shebeen SC
- 2015: Seid El Mahalla
- 2017–2018: Ala'ab Damanhour
- * Club domestic league appearances and goals

Effat Nssar (Arabic: عفت نصار; born July 21, 1964) is a retired Egyptian football midfielder and current football coach. He is the son of a Kuwaiti father and an Egyptian mother. He played for Zamalek & Masry in Egypt.

== Honours ==
=== Club ===
Zamalek SC

- Egyptian Premier League: 3
  1988, 1992, 1993
- Egypt Cup: 1
  1988
- African Cup of Champions Clubs: 2
  1993, 1996
- CAF Super Cup: 1
  1994
- Afro-Asian Club Championship: 1
  1987
