= Juvenil Reyes =

- Full name: Juvenil Reyes Bata
- Ground: Estadio de Bata; Bata, Equatorial Guinea
- Capacity: 22,000
- League: Equatoguinean Premier League

Juvenil Reyes Bata is an Equatoguinean football club based in the city of Bata, Equatorial Guinea. The club has played many season in Equatoguinean Premier League.

== Performance in CAF competitions ==
- CAF Champions League: 2 appearances

1986 African Cup of Champions Clubs – first round
1987 African Cup of Champions Clubs – first round

== Stadium ==
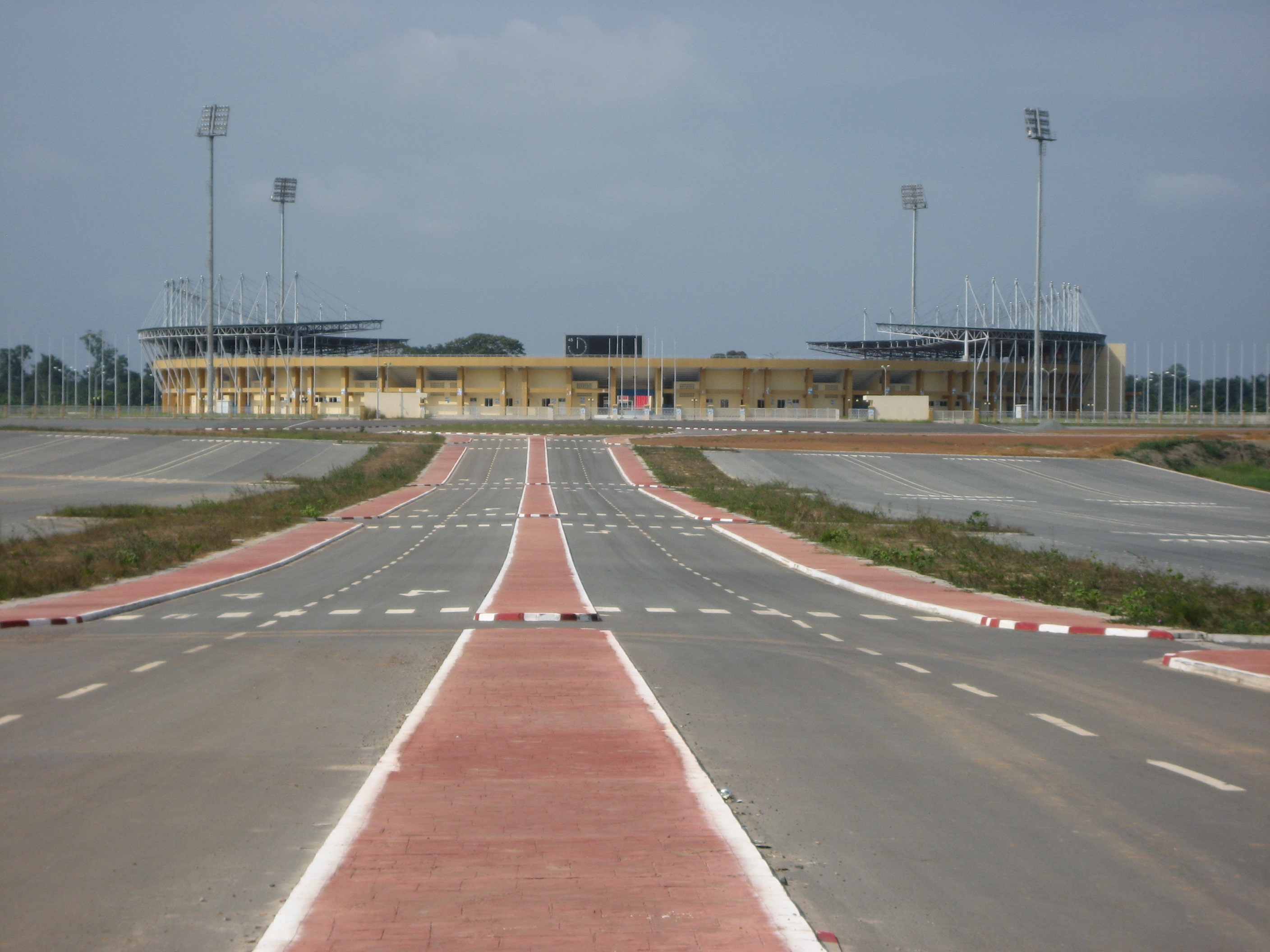
Currently the team plays at the 22,000 capacity Estadio de Bata.
