= 1987 African Cup of Champions Clubs =

Tournament details
- Teams: 39 (from 1 confederation)

Final positions
- Champions: (Egypt) Al Ahly (2nd title)
- Runners-up: (Sudan) Al-Hilal

Tournament statistics
- Matches played: 65
- Goals scored: 145 (2.23 per match)

The 1987 African Cup of Champions Clubs was the 23rd edition of the annual international club football competition held in the CAF region (Africa), the African Cup of Champions Clubs. It determined that year's club champion of association football in Africa.

The tournament was played by 39 teams and was used a playoff scheme with home and away matches. Al Ahly SC from Egypt won that final, and became for the second time CAF club champion.

== Preliminary round ==
| Team 1 | Agg. | Team 2 | 1st leg | 2nd leg |
|---|---|---|---|---|
| BTM Antananarivo (Madagascar) | 2–3 | (Tanzania) Maji Maji FC | 1–1 | 1–2 |
| Juvenil Reyes (Equatorial Guinea) | w/o^{1} | (Central African Republic) Sporting Moura | — | — |
| Matlama FC (Lesotho) | 3–0 | (Botswana) Gaborone United | 1–0 | 2–0 |
| Mogadishu Municipality (Somalia) | 1–2 | (Rwanda) Panthères Noires | 1–0 | 0–2 |
| Petro Atlético (Angola) | 4–1 | (Mozambique) Maxaquene | 3–1 | 1–0 |
| Sporting de Bissau (Guinea-Bissau) | w/o^{1} | (Sierra Leone) Old Edwards | — | — |
| Cadets Club (Mauritius) | 4–4 (a) | (Eswatini) Mbabane Highlanders | 3–2 | 1–2 |

^{1} Sporting Moura and Old Edwardians F.C. both withdrew.

== First round ==
| Team 1 | Agg. | Team 2 | 1st leg | 2nd leg |
|---|---|---|---|---|
| AFC Leopards (Kenya) | 2–0 | (Tanzania) Maji Maji FC | 1–0 | 1–0 |
| Africa Sports (Ivory Coast) | 3–1 | (Togo) ASFOSA Lomé | 2–1 | 1–0 |
| Al Ahly (Egypt) | 5–1 | (Rwanda) Panthères Noires | 4–0 | 1–1 |
| Al-Hilal (Sudan) | 3–0 | (Burundi) AS Inter Star | 2–0 | 1–0 |
| Asante Kotoko (Ghana) | w/o^{1} | (Guinea-Bissau) Sporting de Bissau | — | — |
| Dynamos FC (Zimbabwe) | 8–2 | (Eswatini) Mbabane Highlanders | 6–1 | 2–1 |
| Étoile du Sahel (Tunisia) | w/o^{1} | (Libya) Al-Ittihad Tripoli | — | — |
| FC Lupopo (Zaire) | 1–0 | (Gabon) FC 105 Libreville | 1–0 | 0–0 |
| ASC Jeanne d'Arc (Senegal) | 2–3 | (Algeria) EP Sétif | 2–1 | 0–2 |
| Mighty Barolle (Liberia) | 2–1 | (Guinea) Horoya AC | 2–1 | 0–0 |
| SC Villa (Uganda) | 5–0 | (Lesotho) Matlama FC | 4–0 | 1–0 |
| Nkana Red Devils (Zambia) | 2–1 | (Angola) Petro Atlético | 1–1 | 1–0 |
| Real Bamako (Mali) | 0–4 | (Nigeria) Leventis United | 0–0 | 0–4 |
| Requins de l'Atlantique (Benin) | 0–7 | (Cameroon) Canon Yaoundé | 0–0 | 0–7 |
| Wydad AC (Morocco) | 5–1 | (Mauritania) ASC Police | 3–1 | w/o^{2} |
| Zamalek (Egypt) | w/o^{1} | (Equatorial Guinea) Juvenil Reyes | — | — |

^{1} Sporting de Bissau, Al-Ittihad and Juvenil Reyes all withdrew.
^{2} ASC Police were disqualified after the first leg as the Mauritanian federation failed to pay the first round entry fee.

== Second round ==
| Team 1 | Agg. | Team 2 | 1st leg | 2nd leg |
|---|---|---|---|---|
| Africa Sports (Ivory Coast) | 3–2 | (Liberia) Mighty Barolle | 2–1 | 1–1 |
| Al Ahly (Egypt) | 7–2 | (Kenya) AFC Leopards | 6–0 | 1–2 |
| Dynamos FC (Zimbabwe) | 4–2 | (Zaire) FC Lupopo | 3–1 | 1–1 |
| EP Sétif (Algeria) | 1–2 | (Cameroon) Canon Yaoundé | 0–0 | 1–2 |
| Étoile du Sahel (Tunisia) | 2–2 (a) | (Nigeria) Leventis United | 2–1 | 0–1 |
| SC Villa (Uganda) | 2–2 (a) | (Sudan) Al-Hilal | 2–1 | 0–1 |
| Nkana Red Devils (Zambia) | 1–2 | (Egypt) Zamalek | 1–0 | 0–2 |
| Wydad AC (Morocco) | 1–3 | (Ghana) Asante Kotoko | 1–1 | 0–2 |

== Quarter-finals ==
| Team 1 | Agg. | Team 2 | 1st leg | 2nd leg |
|---|---|---|---|---|
| Africa Sports (Ivory Coast) | 2–2 (2–4 p) | (Egypt) Al Ahly | 2–0 | 0–2 |
| Al-Hilal (Sudan) | 2–1 | (Nigeria) Leventis United | 2–1 | 0–0 |
| Canon Yaoundé (Cameroon) | 3–2 | (Zimbabwe) Dynamos FC | 2–1 | 1–1 |
| Zamalek (Egypt) | 3–5 | (Ghana) Asante Kotoko | 2–0 | 1–5 |

== Semi-finals ==
| Team 1 | Agg. | Team 2 | 1st leg | 2nd leg |
|---|---|---|---|---|
| Al Ahly (Egypt) | 2–1 | (Ghana) Asante Kotoko | 2–0 | 0–1 |
| Al-Hilal (Sudan) | 1–1 (4–1 p) | (Cameroon) Canon Yaoundé | 1–0 | 0–1 |

== Final ==
29 November 1987
--:-- UTC+2

| Al-Hilal (Sudan) | 0–0 | (Egypt) Al Ahly |

Khartoum Stadium, Khartoum
18 December 1987
--:-- UTC+2

| Al Ahly (Egypt) | 2–0 | (Sudan) Al-Hilal |
|---|---|---|
| Jamal Thaalab 5' (o.g.); Shawky 43' |

Cairo International Stadium, Cairo

== Champion ==
1987 African Cup of Champions Clubs winners
(Egypt)
Al Ahly
Second title

== Top scorers ==
The top scorers from the 1987 African Cup of Champions Clubs are as follows:

| Rank | Name | Team | Goals |
|---|---|---|---|
| 1 | (Egypt) Mahmoud El Khatib | (Egypt) Al Ahly | 5 |
| 2 | (Egypt) Ayman Shawky | (Egypt) Al Ahly | 3 |
| 2 | (Egypt) Ayman Younes | (Egypt) Zamalek | 3 |
| 2 | (Ghana) Sarfo Gyamfi | (Ghana) Asante Kotoko | 3 |
| 2 | (Sudan) Waleed Tashein | (Sudan) Al-Hilal Club | 3 |
| 5 | (Angola) Luizinho | (Angola) Petro Atlético | 2 |
| 5 | (Egypt) Moustafa Abdou | (Egypt) Al Ahly | 2 |
| 5 | (Egypt) Alaa Mayhoub | (Egypt) Al Ahly | 2 |
| 5 | (Ghana) Prince Polley | (Ghana) Asante Kotoko | 2 |
