= Ashraf Kasem =

Egyptian footballer and manager (born 1966)

Ashraf Kassem
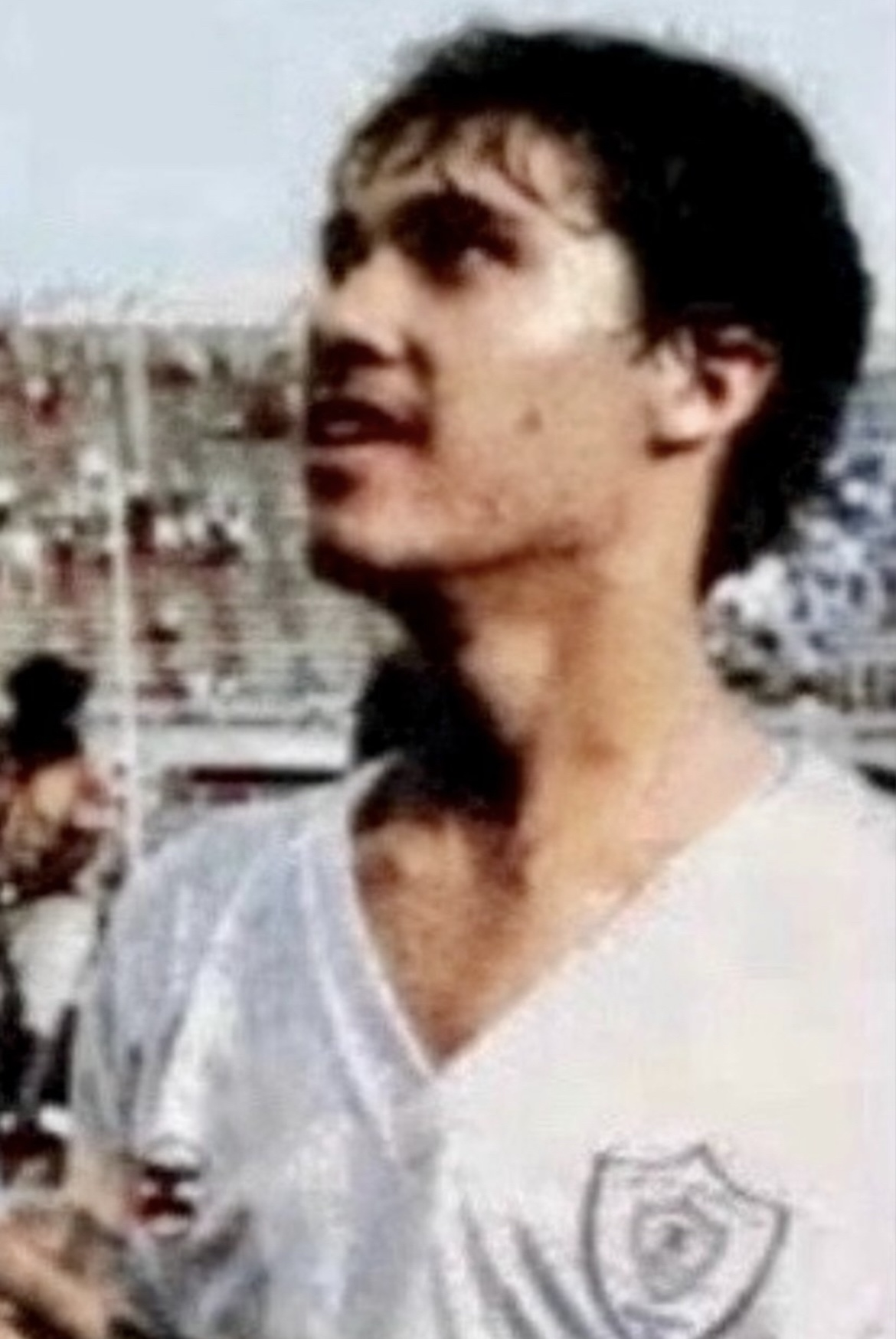

Personal information
- Full name: Ashraf Kassem Raman
- Date of birth: 25 July 1966 (age 60)
- Place of birth: Egypt
- Height: 1.81 m (5 ft 11 in)
- Position: Defender

Team information
- Current team: Al-Hussein Irbid (manager)

Senior career*
Years	Team	Apps	(Gls)
1984–1993	Zamalek		
1993–1994	Al Hilal		
1994–1997	Zamalek		

International career
1984–1994	Egypt	74	(3)

Managerial career
- 1999–2001: Zamalek (Staff)
- 2002–2004: Egypt (Asst Coach)
- 2006–2007: Al-Arabi (Asst Coach)
- 2006–2007: El-Olympi
- 2007–2008: El Shams
- 2008–2009: Tanta
- 2009–2010: El Mansoura
- 2012–2013: Telephonat Beni Sweif
- 2013: Sur
- 2014: Ghazl El-Mahalla
- 2016–2017: El Dakhleya
- 2019–: Al-Hussein Irbid
- * Club domestic league appearances and goals

Ashraf Kassem Raman (Arabic: أَشْرَف قَاسِم عَبْد الرَّحْمٰن; born 25 July 1966) is an Egyptian football manager and former player who is in charge of Al-Hussein Irbid.

== Career ==
Kasem played as a defender for Zamalek from 1984 to 1997. He also played for Al-Hilal of Saudi Arabia in 1994. He won three Egyptian Premier League titles, one Egypt Cup title, three CAF champions League titles, two African Super Cup titles and one Afro-Asian Club Championship title.

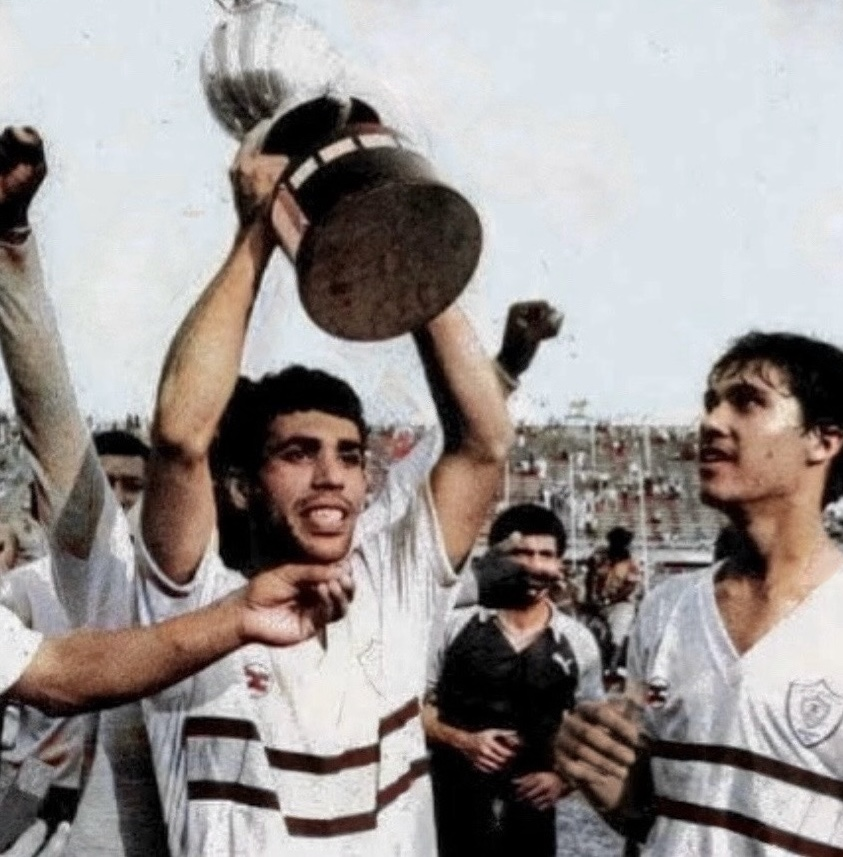
Zamalek players Ayman Younes (left) and Ashraf Kasem lifting the first African Cup of Champions Clubstrophy for the club in the 1984

Kasem played for the Egypt national team from 1986 to 1993, including ten FIFA World Cup qualifying matches. He won with his country the 1986 African Cup of Nations in Egypt. He also played at the 1994 African Cup of Nations.

== Titles ==
Personal titles
Twice times Egyptian footballer of the year 92 & 1993
Arab footballer of the year 1994
As a player for National Team
Participated in World Cup Squad 1990
1 African Cup of Nation title 1986 (Scored decisive penalty kick in final Vs Cameroon)
1 All Africa Games Gold Medal for Egypt 1987
12 Titles As a player for Zamalek
4 Egyptian League titles
1 Egyptian Cup title
1 Egyptian Friendship Cup title
3 African Champion League titles
2 African Super Cup titles
1 Afro-Asian Cup title
As a coach for Zamalek
1 Egyptian League title
1 Egyptian Super Cup title
1 African Cup Winners' Cup title
