= 1987 Afro-Asian Club Championship =

Zamalek	Furukawa Electric
(Egypt)	(Japan)
2	0
- Date: 5 February 1988
- Venue: Cairo Stadium, Cairo
- Referee: Mohamed Hansal (Algeria)
- Attendance: 40,000

The 1987 Afro-Asian Club Championship, was the 2nd Afro-Asian Club Championship competition endorsed by the Confederation of African Football (CAF) and Asian Football Confederation (AFC), contested between the winners of the African Champions' Cup and the Asian Club Championship. This was the last time the game was contested over a single match; from 1988 until 1998 the competition was held in a two-legged tie format.

The match took place on 5 February 1988, in Cairo Stadium in Cairo, Egypt. It was between Zamalek, the 1986 African Cup of Champions Clubs winner, and Furukawa Electric (Now JEF United Ichihara), the 1986 Asian Club Championship winner. Zamalek won the match 2–0 and became the first African team to win the championship.

== Teams ==
Team	Qualification	Previous participation (bold indicates winners)
(Egypt) Zamalek	1986 African Cup of Champions Clubs winner	None
(Japan) Furukawa Electric	1986 Asian Club Championship winner	None

== Match details ==
5 February 1988
15:00

Zamalek (Egypt)	2–0	(Japan) Furukawa Electric
Nssar 47'; Abd El-Hamid 60'

Cairo Stadium
Attendance: 40,000
Referee: Mohamed Hansal (Algeria)

**Zamalek**	**Furukawa Electric**

Zamalek:
GK		(Egypt) Ayman Taher
RB		(Egypt) Hesham Ibrahim
CB		(Egypt) Hesham Yakan
CB		(Egypt) Ismail Youssef
LB		(Egypt) Ahmed Ramzy
CM	**9**	(Egypt) Hamada Abdel-Latif	(substituted off) ?'
CM		(Egypt) Mohamed Helmy	(substituted off) ?'
RW		(Egypt) Reda Abdel-Aal
AM		(Egypt) Ayman Younes
LW	**21**	(Egypt) Effat Nssar
CF		(Egypt) Tarek Yehia
Substitutions:
DF		(Egypt) Ibrahim Youssef	(substituted on) ?'
FW		(Egypt) Gamal Abdel Hamid	(substituted on) ?'
Manager:
(Egypt) Essam Baheeg

Furukawa Electric:
GK	21	(Japan) Yoshio Kato
RB	17	(Japan) Kazuya Igarashi
CB	5	(Japan) Hisashi Kaneko
CB	6	(Japan) Hiroshi Kobayashi
LB	2	(Japan) Takeshi Okada (c)
CM		(Japan) Goto Gotoshi
CM	7	(Japan) Yoshikazu Goto
RW	10	(Japan) Hiroshi Yoshida	(substituted off) ?'
AM	12	(Japan) Masaaki Kanno
LF	11	(Japan) Yoshikazu Nagai
RF	3	(Japan) Yasuhiko Okudera
Substitutions:
MF	9	(Japan) Hideki Maeda	(substituted on) ?'
Manager:
(Japan) Eijun Kiyokumo

Assistant referees:
... ... (...)
... ... (...)
Fourth official:
... ... (...)

Man of the Match:
... ... (...)

== Winners ==
1987 Afro-Asian Club
Championship winners
(Egypt)
Zamalek
First title
