= Badr Hamed =

Egyptian footballer (born 1959)

Personal information
- Full name: Hamed Mohamoud El Badr
- Date of birth: 1959 (age 66–67)
- Position: Defender

Senior career*
| Years | Team | Apps | (Gls) |
- Zamalek SC

International career
- Egypt
- * Club domestic league appearances and goals

Badr Hamed (born 1959) is an Egyptian former footballer. He competed in the men's tournament at the 1984 Summer Olympics.
