= 1991–92 Egyptian Premier League =

Egyptian Premier League
- Dates: 11 October 1991 – 12 June 1992
- Champions: Zamalek (7th title)
- Relegated: Al Mokawloon; Ala'ab Damanhour; Tersana; El Mansoura
- African Cup of Champions Clubs: Zamalek (1st)
- African Cup Winners' Cup: Al Ahly (Cup winner)
- Matches: 184
- Goals: 292 (1.59 per match)
- Top goalscorer: Ahmed El-Kass (14 Goals)

14 teams participated in the 1991–92 Egyptian Premier League season. The first team in the league was the champion, and qualified to the African Cup of Champions Clubs. Zamalek won the league for the 7th time in the club's history.

== League table ==
Pos	Team	Pld	W	D	L	GF	GA	GD	Pts	Qualification or relegation
1	Zamalek (C)	26	15	10	1	36	7	+29	55	1993 African Cup of Champions Clubs
2	Ismaily	26	13	11	2	27	12	+15	50	
3	Ghazl El Mahalla	26	11	11	4	27	11	+16	44	
4	Al Ahly	26	10	10	6	25	14	+11	40	African Cup Winners' Cup
5	Olympic Club	26	9	11	6	34	21	+13	38	
6	Al Masry	26	8	9	9	26	22	+4	33	
7	Al Ittihad	26	6	12	8	12	23	−11	30	
8	El Qanah	26	7	9	10	21	30	−9	30	
9	Al Merreikh	26	5	13	8	14	25	−11	28	
10	Al Mokawloon	26	6	10	10	12	15	−3	28	Relegation play-off
11	El Sekka El Hadid	26	4	14	8	16	26	−10	26	Relegation play-off
12	Ala'ab Damanhour	26	6	8	12	12	26	−14	26	Relegation to Egyptian Second Division
13	Tersana	26	2	14	10	16	28	−12	20	Relegation to Egyptian Second Division
14	El Mansoura	26	2	14	10	11	29	−18	20	Relegation to Egyptian Second Division

(C) Champions

== Relegation play-off ==
=== First leg ===
3 July 1992

El Sekka El Hadid	0–0	Al Mokawloon

=== Second leg ===
6 July 1992

Al Mokawloon	0–0	El Sekka El Hadid
Penalties
	4–5

== Top goalscorers ==
Rank	Player	Club	Goals
1	(Egypt) Ahmed El-Kass	Olympic Club	14
2	(Egypt) Gamal Abdel-Hamid	Zamalek	11
3	(Egypt) Ahmed Sary	Olympic Club	11
4	(Egypt) Mohamed Ramadan	Al Ahly	11
5	(Egypt) Atef El-Quabbani	El Sekka El Hadid	8
