= 1992–93 Egyptian Premier League =

Egyptian Premier League
- Dates: 25 September 1992 – 11 June 1993
- Champions: Zamalek (8th title)
- Relegated: Tanta; El Minya; El Sekka El Hadid
- African Cup of Champions Clubs: Zamalek (1st)
- African Cup Winners' Cup: Al Ahly (Cup winner)
- Matches: 182
- Goals: 340 (1.87 per match)
- Top goalscorer: Ahmed El-Kass (16 Goals)

14 teams participated in the 1992–93 Egyptian Premier League season. The first team in the league was the champion, and qualified to the African Cup of Champions Clubs. Zamalek won the league for the 8th time in the club's history.

== League table ==
Pos	Team	Pld	W	D	L	GF	GA	GD	Pts	Qualification or relegation
1	Zamalek (C)	26	20	5	1	51	11	+40	65	1994 African Cup of Champions Clubs
2	Al Ahly	26	16	7	3	38	12	+26	55	African Cup Winners' Cup
3	Ghazl El Mahalla	26	10	11	5	35	23	+12	41	
4	Ismaily	26	10	11	5	25	18	+7	41	
5	El Qanah	26	7	13	6	19	20	−1	34	
6	Al Masry	26	6	13	7	19	16	+3	31	
7	Gomhoriat Shebin	26	6	13	7	19	21	−2	31	
8	Baladeyet El Mahalla	26	8	9	9	25	28	−3	33	
9	Olympic Club	26	7	11	8	29	34	−5	32	
10	Al Merreikh	25	5	12	8	15	21	−6	27	
11	Al Ittihad	26	6	10	10	15	26	−11	28	
12	Tanta	26	4	11	11	14	33	−19	23	Relegation to Egyptian Second Division
13	El Minya	25	2	10	13	15	35	−20	16	Relegation to Egyptian Second Division
14	El Sekka El Hadid	26	1	10	15	17	38	−21	13	Relegation to Egyptian Second Division

(C) Champions

== Top goalscorers ==
Rank	Player	Club	Goals
1	(Egypt) Ahmed El-Kass	Olympic Club	16
2	(Egypt) Hossam Hassan	Al Ahly	15
3	(Egypt) Moustafa Negm	Zamalek	11
4	(Egypt) Akram Abdel Maguid	Baladeyet El Mahalla	11
5	(Egypt) Yasser Ezzat	Ismaily	9

== Teams ==
Team	Home city
Al Ahly	Cairo
Al Ittihad	Alexandria
Al Merreikh	Port Said
Al Masry	Port Said
Baladeyet El Mahalla	El Mahalla
El Minya	El Minya
El Qanah	Ismailia
El Sekka El Hadid	Cairo
Ghazl El Mahalla	El Mahalla
Gomhoriat Shebin	Shibin El Kom
Ismaily	Ismailia
Olympic	Alexandria
Tanta	Tanta
Zamalek	Giza
