= 1988 Egypt Cup final =

- Event: 1987–88 Egypt Cup
Zamalek	Al Ittihad Alexandria
1	0
- Date: 22 July 1988

1988 Egypt Cup final, was the final match of the 1987–88 Egypt Cup, between football clubs Zamalek and Al Ittihad Alexandria, Zamalek won the match 1–0.

== Route to the final ==
Zamalek		Round	Al Ittihad Alexandria
Opponent	Result	1954–55 Egypt Cup	Opponent	Result
	BYE	First Round		?
Masry	2–1	Quarterfinals		?
Ismaily	3–1	Semifinals		?

== Match details ==
22 July 1988

Zamalek	1 – 0	Al Ittihad Alexandria
Yehia 7'

Zamalek:
GK	?	(Egypt) Ayman Taher
?	?	(Egypt) Medhat Mekki
?	?	(Egypt) Nabil Mahmoud
?	?	(Egypt) Ibrahim Youssef (Mohamed Genaidi)
?	?	(Egypt) Badr Hamed
?	?	(Egypt) Hamada Abdel Latif
?	?	(Egypt) Reda Abdel-Aal
?	?	(Egypt) Hesham Ibrahim
?	?	(Egypt) Mohamed Helmy
?	?	(Egypt) Ahmed El-Shazly
?	?	(Egypt) Tarek Yehia (Zakaria Nasef)
Substitutions:
?	?	(Egypt) Mohamed Genaidi
?	?	(Egypt) Zakaria Nasef
Manager:
(Egypt) Essam Baheeg

Al Ittihad Alexandria:
GK	?	(Egypt) Khaled Moustafa
?	?	(Egypt) El-Esnawi
?	?	(Egypt) Tarek El-Ashry
?	?	(Egypt) Hassan Abbas
?	?	(Egypt) Said Abdel Ghaffar
?	?	(Egypt) Hassan Morsi
?	?	(Egypt) Moanes El-Sawi
?	?	(Egypt) Mahmoud Atta (Magdi Ezzat)
?	?	(Egypt) Eid Ahmed (Aman Fadl)
?	?	(Egypt) Moustafa Negm
?	?	(Egypt) Ahmed Sharaf
Substitutions:
?	?	(Egypt) Magdi Ezzat
?	?	(Egypt) Aman Fadl
Manager:
