= 1986 African Cup of Champions Clubs =

Tournament details
- Teams: 38 (from 1 confederation)

Final positions
- Champions: (Egypt) Zamalek (2nd title)
- Runners-up: (Ivory Coast) Africa Sports

Tournament statistics
- Matches played: 67
- Goals scored: 169 (2.52 per match)
- Top scorer: (Egypt) Gamal Abdel Hamid (7 goals)

The 1986 African Cup of Champions Clubs was the 22nd edition of the annual international club football competition held in the CAF region (Africa), the African Cup of Champions Clubs. It determined that year's club champion of association football in Africa.

The tournament was played by 38 teams and was used a playoff scheme with home and away matches. Zamalek SC from Egypt won that final against Africa Sports from Ivory Coast, and became CAF club champion for the second time.

== Preliminary round ==
| Team 1 | Agg. | Team 2 | 1st leg | 2nd leg |
|---|---|---|---|---|
| EF Ouagadougou (Burkina Faso) | w/o^{1} | (Mauritania) ACS Ksar | — | — |
| Lioli FC (Lesotho) | 2–7 | (Tanzania) Maji Maji FC | 2–3 | 0–4 |
| Manzini Wanderers (Eswatini) | 3–6 | (Madagascar) AS Sotema | 1–3 | 2–3 |
| Panthères Noires (Rwanda) | 5–1 | (Somalia) Wagad FC | 3–0 | 2–1 |
| Stade Centrafricain (Central African Republic) | 6–2 | (Equatorial Guinea) Juvenil Reyes | 4–1 | 2–1 |
| UD Internacional (Guinea-Bissau) | w/o^{1} | (Sierra Leone) East End Lions | — | — |

^{1} ACS Ksar and East End Lions both withdrew.

== First round ==
| Team 1 | Agg. | Team 2 | 1st leg | 2nd leg |
|---|---|---|---|---|
| ASFOSA Lomé (Togo) | 0–4 | (Nigeria) NNB | 0–2 | 0–2 |
| Africa Sports (Ivory Coast) | 1–1 (4–3 p) | (Benin) Requins de l'Atlantique FC | 1–0 | 0–1 |
| Al-Merrikh (Sudan) | 2–2 (a) | (Tunisia) Espérance de Tunis | 2–1 | 0–1 |
| Kenya Breweries | 1–2 | (Ethiopia) Brewery Jimma | 0–0 | 1–2 |
| Canon Yaoundé (Cameroon) | 3–2 | (Angola) Primeiro de Maio | 3–0 | 0–2 |
| Al-Dhahra SC (Libya) | 2–3 | (Uganda) KCC | 2–1 | 0–2 |
| Dynamos FC (Zimbabwe) | 5–1 | (Tanzania) Maji Maji FC | 5–1 | w/o^{1} |
| FAR Rabat (Morocco) | w/o^{2} | (Guinea-Bissau) UD Internacional | — | — |
| FC 105 Libreville (Gabon) | 1–2 | (Central African Republic) Stade Centrafricain | 1–0 | 0–2 |
| Hearts of Oak (Ghana) | 2–1 | (The Gambia) Wallidan FC | 2–0 | 0–1 |
| Horoya AC (Guinea) | 5–3 | (Liberia) Invincible Eleven | 4–0 | 1–3 |
| AS Inter Star (Burundi) | 3–2 | (Zaire) US Tshinkunku | 2–1 | 1–1 |
| JE Tizi Ouzou (Algeria) | 6–1 | (Burkina Faso) EF Ouagadougou | 5–0 | 1–1 |
| ASC Jeanne d'Arc (Senegal) | 0–2 | (Morocco) Maghreb Fez | 0–0 | 0–2 |
| Nkana Red Devils (Zambia) | 5–3 | (Madagascar) AS Sotema | 4–1 | 1–2 |
| Zamalek (Egypt) | 6–2 | (Rwanda) Panthères Noires | 5–1 | 1–1 |

^{1} Maji Maji FC withdrew after the 1st leg.
^{2} UD Internacional withdrew.

== Second round ==
| Team 1 | Agg. | Team 2 | 1st leg | 2nd leg |
|---|---|---|---|---|
| Africa Sports (Ivory Coast) | 5–2 | (Nigeria) NNB | 5–0 | 0–2 |
| Brewery Jimma (Ethiopia) | 0–0 (3–4 p) | (Zambia) Nkana Red Devils | 0–0 | 0–0 |
| Horoya AC (Guinea) | 1–4 | (Ghana) Hearts of Oak | 1–2 | 0–2 |
| JE Tizi Ouzou (Algeria) | 2–2 (a) | (Tunisia) Espérance de Tunis | 2–1 | 0–1 |
| KCC (Uganda) | 2–3 | (Burundi) AS Inter Star | 1–1 | 1–2 |
| Maghreb Fez (Morocco) | 1–3 | (Cameroon) Canon Yaoundé | 1–0 | 0–3 |
| Stade Centrafricain (Central African Republic) | 1–7 | (Morocco) FAR Rabat | 0–1 | 1–6 |
| Zamalek (Egypt) | 4–1 | (Zimbabwe) Dynamos FC | 2–1 | 2–0 |

== Quarter-finals ==
| Team 1 | Agg. | Team 2 | 1st leg | 2nd leg |
|---|---|---|---|---|
| Africa Sports (Ivory Coast) | 2–2 (a) | (Tunisia) Espérance de Tunis | 1–0 | 1–2 |
| Canon Yaoundé (Cameroon) | 2–1 | (Morocco) FAR Rabat | 2–0 | 0–1 |
| AS Inter Star (Burundi) | 1–3 | (Egypt) Zamalek | 1–0 | 0–3 |
| Nkana Red Devils (Zambia) | 3–1 | (Ghana) Hearts of Oak | 2–0 | 1–1 |

== Semi-finals ==
| Team 1 | Agg. | Team 2 | 1st leg | 2nd leg |
|---|---|---|---|---|
| Canon Yaoundé (Cameroon) | 2–3 | (Egypt) Zamalek | 2–1 | 0–2 |
| Nkana Red Devils (Zambia) | 1–1 (a) | (Ivory Coast) Africa Sports | 1–1 | 0–0 |

== Final ==
28 November 1986
--:-- UTC+2

| Zamalek (Egypt) | 2–0 | (Ivory Coast) Africa Sports |
|---|---|---|
| Younes 45', 48' |

Cairo International Stadium, Cairo
21 December 1986
--:-- UTC+0

| Africa Sports (Ivory Coast) | 2–0 | (Egypt) Zamalek |
|---|---|---|
| Guédé Gba ?'; Lué 58' (pen.) |
Penalties
| Penalty scored Penalty missed | 2–4 | (penalty missed) Tolba; (penalty scored) Abdel-Hamid; (penalty scored) Helmy; (penalty scored) Abdel-Latif; (penalty scored) Kasem |

Stade Félix Houphouët-Boigny, Abidjan

== Champion ==
1986 African Cup of Champions Clubs winners
(Egypt)
Zamalek
Second title

== Top scorers ==
The top scorers from the 1986 African Cup of Champions Clubs are as follows:

| Rank | Name | Team | Goals |
|---|---|---|---|
| 1 | (Egypt) Gamal Abdel Hamid | (Egypt) Zamalek | 7 |
| 2 | (Egypt) Tarek Yehia | (Egypt) Zamalek | 4 |
| 2 | (Egypt) Ayman Younes | (Egypt) Zamalek | 4 |
| 2 | (Algeria) Nacer Bouiche | (Algeria) JS Kabylie | 4 |
| 4 | (Cameroon) François Omam-Biyik | (Cameroon) Canon Yaoundé | 2 |
| 4 | (Morocco) Abderrazak Khairi | (Morocco) FAR Rabat | 2 |
| 4 | (Morocco) Abdeslam Laghrissi | (Morocco) FAR Rabat | 2 |
| 4 | (Morocco) Mohamed Timoumi | (Morocco) FAR Rabat | 2 |
