= Egyptian Friendship Cup =

- Organiser(s): Ministry of Youth and Sport; Egyptian Football Association
- Founded: 1986
- Region: Egypt
- Domestic cup: Egypt Cup
- Most championships: Zamalek (1 title)

Egyptian Friendship Cup, is an Egyptian official football tournament. It was organized by the Egyptian Ministry of Youth and Sport and the Egyptian Football Association. The tournament was held once in 1986. It was launched for fundraising for the Egyptian external debt minimization program. The final match took place in the Cairo Stadium.

== Overview ==
The tournament was organized by the Egyptian higher Council for youth and sports (Ministry of Youth and Sport) in coordination with the Egyptian Football Association. It was held once in 1986. Zamalek won the Egyptian Friendship Cup after defeating Al Ahly by a score of 1–0, Zamalek's striker Gamal Abdel-Hamid scored the single winning goal in Ahmed Shobair's net in the 82nd minute.

"The Black Deer", Ibrahim Youssef was the one who raised the cup as he was Zamalek's captain in 1986.

== Match details ==
14 February 1986
Final

Zamalek	1–0	Al Ahly
Abdel-Hamid 82'

Cairo International Stadium
Attendance: 81,000

Zamalek	Al Ahly

== See also ==
- Egypt Cup
- Egyptian Super Cup
- Sultan Hussein Cup
- Football in Egypt
