= 1983–84 Egyptian Premier League =

Egyptian Premier League
- Season: 1983–84
- Champions: Zamalek (5th title)
- Relegated: Plastic; El Koroum
- Top goalscorer: Ayman Shawki (8)

The twenty-eighth season of the Egyptian Premier League ended with Zamalek crowning its fifth title. After Zamalek got 36 points, Al-Ahly ranked second with 34 points.

== Teams ==
- Al Ahly
- Al Masry
- Ghazl El Mahalla
- Al Ittihad
- Ismaily
- El Koroum
- Al Mokawloon Al Arab
- El Minya
- Olympic
- Tersana
- Zamalek
- Plastic

== League Table ==
Pos	Team	Pld	W	D	L	GF	GA	GD	Pts	Qualification or relegation
1	Zamalek	22	15	6	1	26	8	+18	36	Champions
2	Al Ahly	22	14	6	2	30	9	+21	34	
3	Ismaily	22	9	8	5	22	13	+9	26	
4	Al Masry	22	9	5	8	26	21	+5	23	
5	Al Mokawloon Al Arab	22	6	10	6	15	17	−2	22	
6	Ghazl El Mahalla	22	3	13	6	18	18	0	19	
7	El Minya	22	5	9	8	12	12	0	19	
8	Tersana	22	6	7	9	15	21	−6	19	
9	Al Ittihad	22	3	11	8	8	17	−9	17	
10	Olympic	22	5	7	10	15	26	−11	17	
11	Plastic	22	5	7	10	16	28	−12	17	Relegation
12	El Koroum	22	5	5	12	13	26	−13	15	Relegation

Source: RSSSF

== Scorers ==
Ayman Shouky from El Koroum with 8 goals
