= 1987–88 Egyptian Premier League =

Egyptian Premier League
- Season: 1987–88
- Champions: Zamalek; 6th title
- Relegated: Ghazl Domiat; Naseeg Helwan
- Top goalscorer: Gamal Abdel Hamid (Zamalek) - 10 Goals

The 1987–88 Egyptian Premier League is the 31 season of the Egyptian Premier League since its establishment in 1948. It was contested by one group of 12 teams.

== League table ==
Pos	Team	Pld	W	D	L	GF	GA	GD	Pts
1	Zamalek SC (C)	22	16	5	1	43	8	+35	53
2	Al Ahly	22	17	2	3	37	10	+27	53
3	Ghazl El Mahalla	22	11	8	3	30	14	+16	41
4	Ismaily	22	10	6	6	19	14	+5	36
5	Al Masry	22	7	9	6	19	20	−1	30
6	Tersana	22	6	7	9	25	27	−2	25
7	Olympic	22	6	6	10	14	21	−7	24
8	Al Mokawloon Al Arab	22	4	11	7	23	22	+1	23
9	Al Ittihad	22	4	10	8	12	21	−9	22
10	Al Merreikh	22	5	7	10	11	25	−14	22
11	Ghazl Domiat (R)	22	4	9	9	10	17	−7	21
12	Naseeg Helwan (R)	22	0	4	18	6	50	−44	4

Source: rsssf.com
(C) Champions; (R) Relegated
