= CAF Champions League =

African association football tournament

- Organiser(s): CAF
- Founded: 1964; 62 years ago (rebranded in 1997)
- Region: Africa
- Teams: 16 (group stage); 68 (total); (from 56 associations)
- Qualifier for: FIFA Club World Cup; FIFA Intercontinental Cup; CAF Super Cup
- Related competitions: CAF Confederation Cup
- Current champions: (South Africa) Mamelodi Sundowns (2nd title)
- Most championships: (Egypt) Al Ahly (12 titles)
- Broadcasters: List of broadcasters
- Website: Official website
- 2026–27 CAF Champions League

The CAF Champions League, known for sponsorship purposes as the TotalEnergies CAF Champions League and formerly the African Cup of Champions Clubs, is an annual club football competition organized by the Confederation of African Football (CAF) and contested by top-division African clubs, deciding the competition winners through a round robin group stage to qualify for a double-legged knockout stage, and then a home and away final. It is the most prestigious club competition in African football.

The winner of each season of the competition earns a berth for the FIFA Club World Cup, faces the winner of the CAF Confederation Cup in the following season's CAF Super Cup and from 2024 onwards, along with the next 4 best teams, a place in the new FIFA Intercontinental Cup. Clubs that finish as runners-up their national leagues, having not qualified for the Champions League, are eligible for the second-tier CAF Confederation Cup.

Egyptian clubs have the highest number of victories (19 titles), followed by Morocco with 7. Egypt also has the largest number of winning teams, with four clubs having won the title. The competition has been won by 26 clubs, 12 of which have won it more than once. Al Ahly is the most successful club in the competition's history, having it a record 12 times. The current champions are Mamelodi Sundowns, having beaten AS FAR 2–1 on aggregate in the 2026 final.

== History ==
List of winners
Season	Winners
African Cup of Champions Clubs
1965	(Cameroon) Oryx Douala
1966	(Ivory Coast) Stade d'Abidjan
1967	(Democratic Republic of the Congo) TP Englebert
1968	(Democratic Republic of the Congo) TP Englebert (2)
1969	(United Arab Republic) Ismaily
1970	(Ghana) Asante Kotoko
1971	(Cameroon) Canon Yaoundé
1972	(Guinea) Hafia FC
1973	(Zaire) AS Vita Club
1974	(Republic of the Congo) CARA Brazzaville
1975	(Guinea) Hafia FC (2)
1976	(Algeria) MC Alger
1977	(Guinea) Hafia FC (3)
1978	(Cameroon) Canon Yaoundé (2)
1979	(Cameroon) Union Douala
1980	(Cameroon) Canon Yaoundé (3)
1981	(Algeria) JE Tizi Ouzou
1982	(Egypt) Al Ahly
1983	(Ghana) Asante Kotoko (2)
1984	(Egypt) Zamalek
1985	(Morocco) FAR Rabat
1986	(Egypt) Zamalek (2)
1987	(Egypt) Al Ahly (2)
1988	(Algeria) Entente de Sétif
1989	(Morocco) Raja CA
1990	(Algeria) JS Kabylie (2)
1991	(Tunisia) Club Africain
1992	(Morocco) Wydad AC
1993	(Egypt) Zamalek (3)
1994	(Tunisia) Espérance de Tunis
1995	(South Africa) Orlando Pirates
1996	(Egypt) Zamalek (4)
CAF Champions League
1997	(Morocco) Raja CA (2)
1998	(Ivory Coast) ASEC Mimosas
1999	(Morocco) Raja CA (3)
2000	(Ghana) Hearts of Oak
2001	(Egypt) Al Ahly (3)
2002	(Egypt) Zamalek (5)
2003	(Nigeria) Enyimba
2004	(Nigeria) Enyimba (2)
2005	(Egypt) Al Ahly (4)
2006	(Egypt) Al Ahly (5)
2007	(Tunisia) Étoile du Sahel
2008	(Egypt) Al Ahly (6)
2009	(Democratic Republic of the Congo) TP Mazembe (3)
2010	(Democratic Republic of the Congo) TP Mazembe (4)
2011	(Tunisia) Espérance de Tunis (2)
2012	(Egypt) Al Ahly (7)
2013	(Egypt) Al Ahly (8)
2014	(Algeria) ES Sétif (2)
2015	(Democratic Republic of the Congo) TP Mazembe (5)
2016	(South Africa) Mamelodi Sundowns
2017	(Morocco) Wydad AC (2)
2018	(Tunisia) Espérance de Tunis (3)
2019	(Tunisia) Espérance de Tunis (4)
2020	(Egypt) Al Ahly (9)
2021	(Egypt) Al Ahly (10)
2022	(Morocco) Wydad AC (3)
2023	(Egypt) Al Ahly (11)
2024	(Egypt) Al Ahly (12)
2025	(Egypt) Pyramids
2026	(South Africa) Mamelodi Sundowns (2)

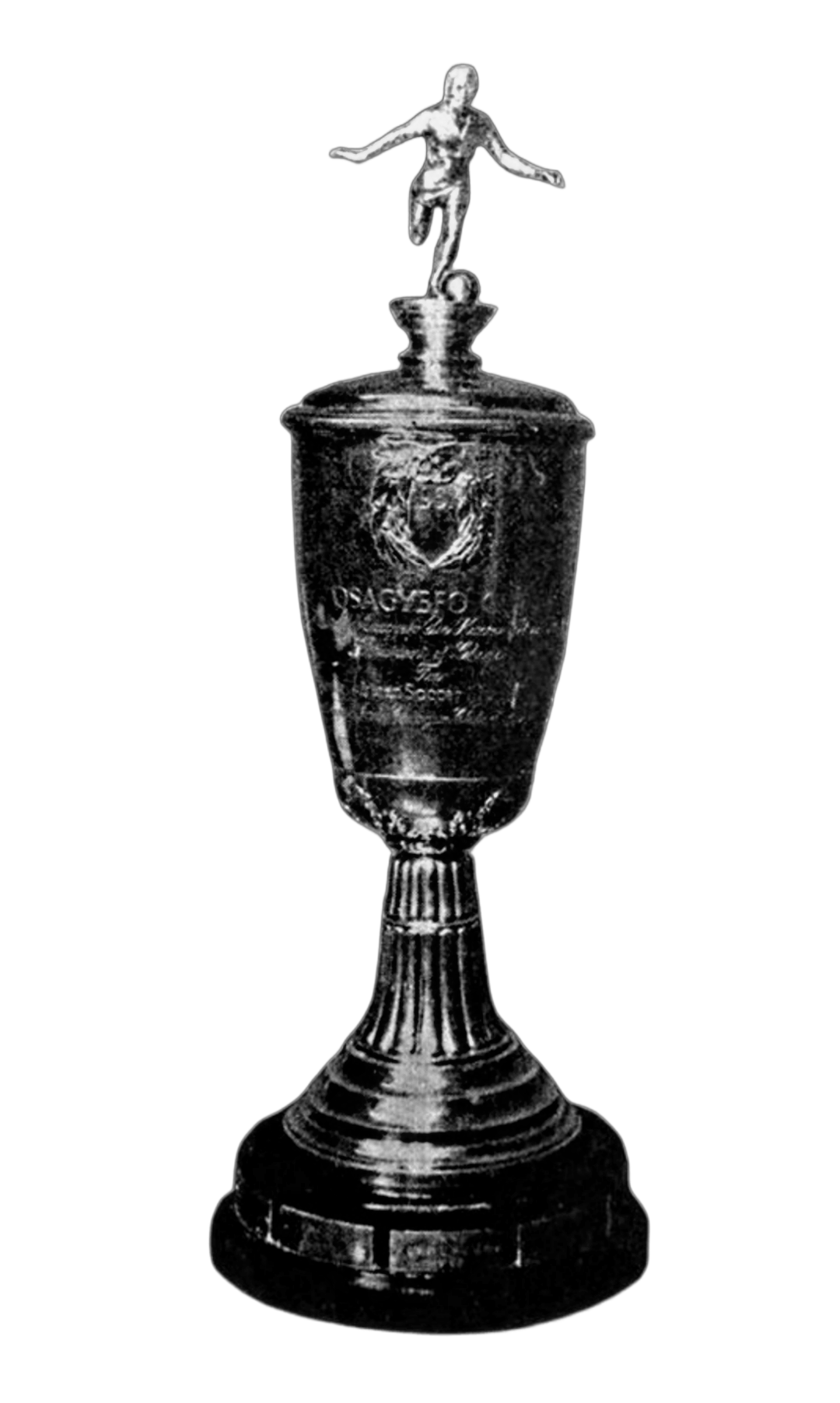
First-ever trophy, designed in 1964 (used until 1977).

Established in 1964 as the African Cup of Champions Clubs and following the lead of UEFA, who created the European Champion Clubs Cup 9 years earlier in 1955, the first team to lift the trophy was Cameroonian team Oryx Douala who beat Stade Malien of Mali 2–1 in a one-off final.

The 1966 edition introduced the two-legged 'home and away' final, which saw another Malian team AS Real Bamako take on Stade d'Abidjan of Ivory Coast. Real Bamako won the home leg 3–1 but it all came apart for them in the away game in Abidjan as the Ivorians went on to win 4–1 to take the title 5–4 on aggregate.

In 1967 when Asante Kotoko of Ghana met TP Mazembe of the Democratic Republic of the Congo (or the DRC for short), both matches ended in draws (1–1 and 2–2 respectively). CAF arranged a play-off, but Kotoko failed to appear and the title was handed to Mazembe, who went on to win the title again the following year.

However, the Ghanaians got their revenge in 1970, when Kotoko and Mazembe once again met in the final. Once again, the first game ended 1–1, but against expectation, the Ghanaians ran out 2–1 winners in their away game to lift the title that had eluded them three years earlier.

The 1970s saw a remarkable rise in the fortunes of Cameroonian club football, which created the platform of success enjoyed by Cameroonian football at international level today.

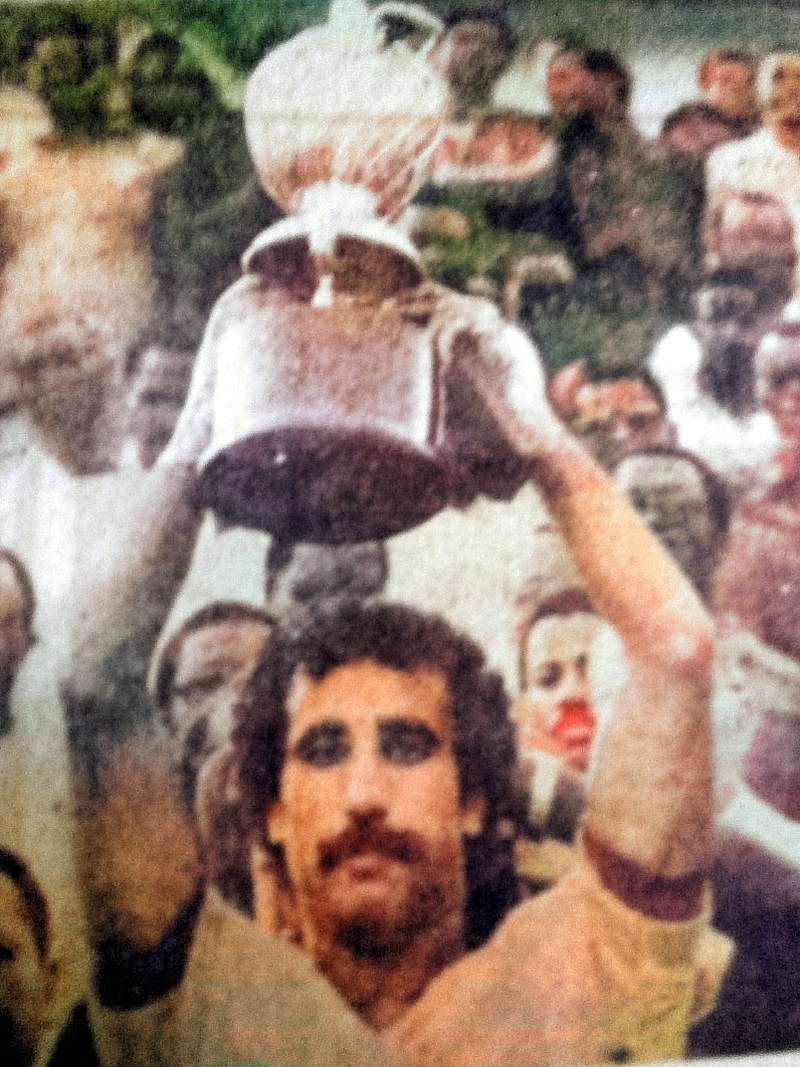
JS Kabylie in 1981

Between 1971 and 1980 Cameroonian teams won the cup four times, with Canon Yaoundé taking three titles (1971, 1978 and 1980) and US Douala lifting the cup in 1979. In between the Cameroonian victories the honor was shared with another team enjoying a golden age, Guinean side Hafia Conakry, who won it three times during this period (1972, 1975 and 1977)

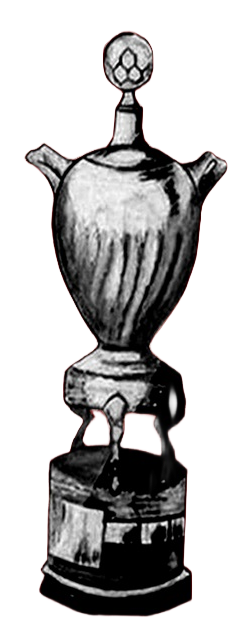
Second trophy, in use from 1977 to 1993.

=== 1997–present: Change of name and rise in reputation ===
Apart from the introduction of the away goals rule, very little changed in this competition until 1997, when CAF under Issa Hayatou took the bold step to follow the lead established a few years earlier by UEFA by creating a league/group stage in the tournament and changing the name to the CAF Champions League (in line with UEFA's own Champions League). CAF also introduced prize money for participants for the first time with the initial offering of US$1 million to the winners and US$750,000 to the runners-up, making the rebranded competition the richest African club competition at the time.

In the new format, the league champions of the respective CAF member countries go through a series of qualification rounds until a round of 16 stage. The 8 winners are then drawn into two groups of 4 teams each, with each team playing each other on a home and away basis. At the end of the league stage, the top team in each group met in the final, in two-legged games (home and away). In the 2001 season, the CAF introduced the semi-final stage after group stage, then the top two teams in each group would meet in the semi-finals, with the winners going through to contest the final.

Beginning with the 2009 season, the prize money increased to $1.5 million for the champions and $1 million for the runner-ups. Since the competition rebranded in 1997, teams from North Africa have come to dominate the competition and its records. Morocco's Raja Casablanca won two of the first three editions, but Al Ahly became the most successful team, winning the 2001, 2005, 2006, 2008 and 2012 editions, while Zamalek managed to be champions in 2002. Tunisian teams broke into the winners' circle with Étoile du Sahel winning the 2007 edition after being a losing finalist in 2004 and 2005. For its part, Espérance de Tunis achieved its second continental title in 2011 after having lost in the finals in the 1999, 2000, 2010 and 2012 editions.

Despite the clear dominance of North African teams, Nigerian club Enyimba won their first two titles back-to-back in 2003 and 2004. ASEC Mimosas from Ivory Coast and Accra Hearts of Oak from Ghana added two titles for West Africa, which to date would be the latest of such feats. In 2010, TP Mazembe from the DRC became the first club to repeat as champions on two occasions, with the first pair of wins arriving in 1967 and 1968, before repeating the feat again in 2009 and 2010. In 2017, the group phase was expanded from 2 groups of 4 teams to 4 groups of 16, with the automatic addition of the quarter-finals stage.

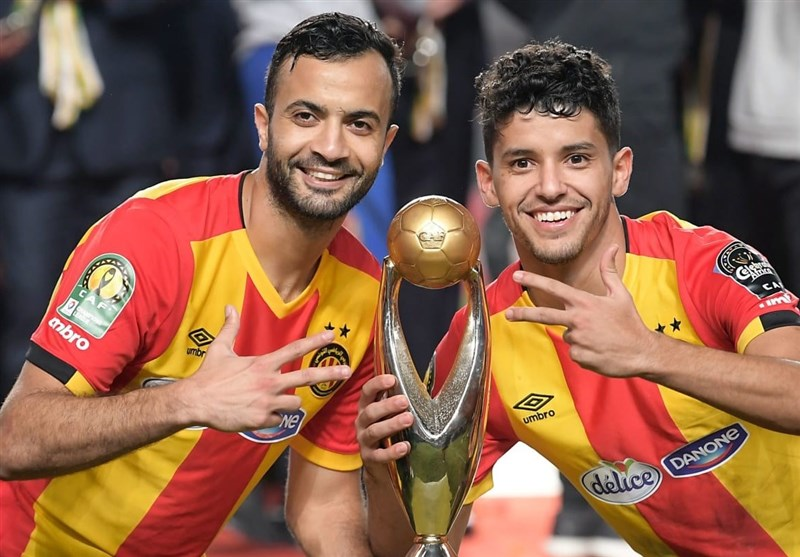
Espérance Sportive players celebrating the 2018 CAF Champions League title.

The 2020–21 season was played behind closed doors due to the COVID-19 pandemic in Africa in line with global football leagues and competitions. Nevertheless, Al Ahly faced bitter rivals Zamalek in an-all Egyptian final (the first time two clubs from the same country compete in any final in the competition's history), with the former emerging victorious and winning its ninth title. Al Ahly successfully defended their title for a record-extending 10th time the following season by beating 10-men Kaizer Chiefs of South Africa, but were unable to secure a 3rd consecutive title in a row and 11th title in 2022 as they were defeated 2–0 by Moroccan club Wydad AC who instead captured their 3rd title. With a return to two-legged finals after a 24-month hiatus owing to the pandemic, Al Ahly roared back, got their revenge the following season and wrestled the title back from Wydad, thus claiming their 11th title in 2023 with a 3–2 aggregate win thanks to forward Mohamed Abdelmoneim's tie-breaking goal and successfully defended it for the second time in the space of half a decade (5 years) in 2024 for a record extending 12th title with a 1–0 aggregate win over Tunisia's Esperance.

With the introduction of the Africa Football League in the 2023–24 season, CAF attempted to establish a new competition to rival the CAF Champions League. However, the Africa Football League failed to generate the same level of popular enthusiasm and only lasted for a single edition. The CAF Champions League remains Africa's premier club competition, boasting the highest prize money on the continent. The 2026 edition was won by South Africa's Mamelodi Sundowns after a decade-long dominance of North African clubs, marking their second CAF Champions League title and first since 2016 after defeating Moroccan side AS FAR in the final.

== Structure and qualification ==
=== Qualification and allocation ===
The CAF Champions League is open to the champions of all national top-flight leagues affiliated with CAF, as well as the defending Champions League title holders from the previous season.

Starting with the 2004 season — following the merger of the CAF Cup and the African Cup Winners' Cup to create the second-tier CAF Confederation Cup — the runners-up of the domestic leagues from the 12 highest-ranked associations in the CAF 5-year ranking are also granted entry, establishing a 64-team competition field. The 12 associations are determined annually based on the performance of their representative clubs in CAF interclub competitions over the preceding five seasons.

Associations with higher coefficient rankings receive more berths and may receive byes for their clubs to later qualifying stages, as determined by the CAF Organising Committee for Interclub Competitions.

=== Tournament format ===
The tournament consists of two main phases: the qualifying rounds and the tournament proper (group stage and knockout phase).

- Qualifying rounds: The competition begins with two knockout qualification stages played over two legs (home and away)—the preliminary round and the first round. Teams from lower-ranked national associations enter in the preliminary round, while top-ranked clubs enter directly in the first round based on individual club coefficient rankings.
- Group stage: The 16 winning teams from the first qualifying round advance to the group stage, where they are drawn into four groups of four teams each. Teams play each opponent in their group on a home-and-away round-robin basis (six total matches per club). The group winners and runners-up advance to the knockout stage.
- Knockout phase: The top eight teams compete in a two-legged knockout bracket starting from the quarter-finals, progressing to the semi-finals and the final. All ties, including the final, are played across two legs on a home-and-away basis.

=== Tie-breaking and progression rules ===
In two-legged knockout ties, the team that scores the higher aggregate number of goals over both legs qualifies for the next round. If aggregate scores are tied, the away goals rule is applied. If still tied, extra time is omitted and the tie is decided immediately by a penalty shoot-out.

Teams eliminated in the second preliminary round of the CAF Champions League automatically transfer to the play-off round of the CAF Confederation Cup for a second chance at reaching group stage football.

== Officiating and technology ==
=== Video Assistant Referee (VAR) ===
Video Assistant Referee (VAR) technology was first deployed in African continental football during the 2018 CAF Super Cup match between Wydad AC and TP Mazembe in Casablanca.

In November 2018, CAF officially introduced VAR to the CAF Champions League for the first time during the first leg of the 2018 CAF Champions League Final between Al Ahly and Espérance Sportive de Tunis. Following its inaugural rollout, CAF progressively implemented VAR across all quarter-final, semi-final, and final fixtures in subsequent editions before mandating full technological coverage across all group stage and knockout matches.

== Qualification to international competitions ==
=== CAF Super Cup ===
The winner of the CAF Champions League earns an automatic spot in the annual CAF Super Cup, where they face the winner of the second-tier CAF Confederation Cup in a single-match title showdown.

=== FIFA Intercontinental Cup and FIFA Club World Cup ===
As Africa's premier club competition, the CAF Champions League serves as the primary qualification pathway for FIFA's global club tournaments:

- FIFA Intercontinental Cup: The tournament winner represents CAF in the annual FIFA Intercontinental Cup, entering the African–Asian–Pacific Cup stage. In odd-numbered years, they enter into the playoff stage and play against the winner of the OFC Professional League (OFC Champions League in 2025) for the chance to play the AFC Champions League Elite winner for the African–Asian–Pacific Cup, while in even-numbered years they swap places with the AFC representative and enter in the main stage to face the playoff winner.
- FIFA Club World Cup: Under FIFA's expanded quadrennial 32-team FIFA Club World Cup structure, Africa is allocated four slots. The winners of the CAF Champions League across each four-year cycle earn direct entry into the tournament alongside top-ranked African clubs determined by the CAF four-year ranking coefficient. No more than two teams per country qualify for the Club World Cup from CAF unless three or more clubs from the same country have won the CAF Champions League in the four-year period. Should one club win more than one CAF Champions League title, their additional place(s) are reallocated to the best-performing team(s) in the coefficient that haven't qualified.

== Regional dominance and dynamics ==
Historically, the competition has witnessed shifts in regional dominance across the African continent:

- Sub-Saharan Era (1965–1980): Clubs from West and Central Africa dominated the early decades of the tournament, led by clubs such as Hafia FC (Guinea), TP Englebert (DR Congo), and Canon Yaoundé (Cameroon).
- North African Dominance (1981–present): North African clubs from Egypt, Tunisia, Morocco and Algeria emerged as the dominant force in continental football, winning a majority of titles since the 1980s. Egyptian clubs Al Ahly and Zamalek, alongside Moroccan powers Raja CA and Wydad AC, and Tunisian side Espérance Sportive de Tunis, have consistently headlined the latter stages of the tournament.

== Sponsorship ==
In October 2004, MTN contracted a four-year deal to sponsor CAF's competitions worth US$12.5 million, which at that time was the biggest sponsorship deal in African sporting history.

In 2008, CAF put a value of €100 million for a comprehensive and long-term package of its competitions when it opened tenders for a new sponsor, which was scooped up by French telecommunications giant Orange through the signing of an eight-year deal the following year in July, whose terms were not disclosed.

On 21 July 2016, French energy and petroleum giant, TotalEnergies (at the time known as Total S.A.) secured an 8-year sponsorship package from CAF to sponsore its competitions, including its main competition, the Africa Cup of Nations, which was extended for four more years, i.e. until 2028.

=== Commercial partners ===
Title Sponsor	Official Sponsors	Technical Partner / Ball Supplier
TotalEnergies	Orange; 1xBet; TikTok; QNET	Puma

== Trophy and awards ==
=== Evolution of the trophy ===
Throughout the history of the tournament, three distinct trophies have been presented to the champions:

- Kwame Nkrumah Cup (1965–1977): The inaugural trophy, named in honor of Ghana's first president Kwame Nkrumah, was permanently retained by Guinean club Hafia FC in 1977 after becoming the first club to win the African Cup of Champions Clubs three times (1975, 1977, 1977).
- Ahmed Sékou Touré Cup (1978–1993): Named after Guinean leader Ahmed Sékou Touré, this trophy was permanently awarded to Cameroonian side Canon Yaoundé in 1980 after their third title. Subsequent permanent awardings went to Egyptian side Zamalek in 1993 following their third tournament victory.
- CAF Champions League Trophy (1997–2025): Introduced during the 1997 rebranding of the competition, the current silver trophy features a globe held aloft by abstract football figures. Egyptian giants Al Ahly earned the right to permanently retain the initial version of this trophy after winning their third Champions League title under the rebranded era in 2006.
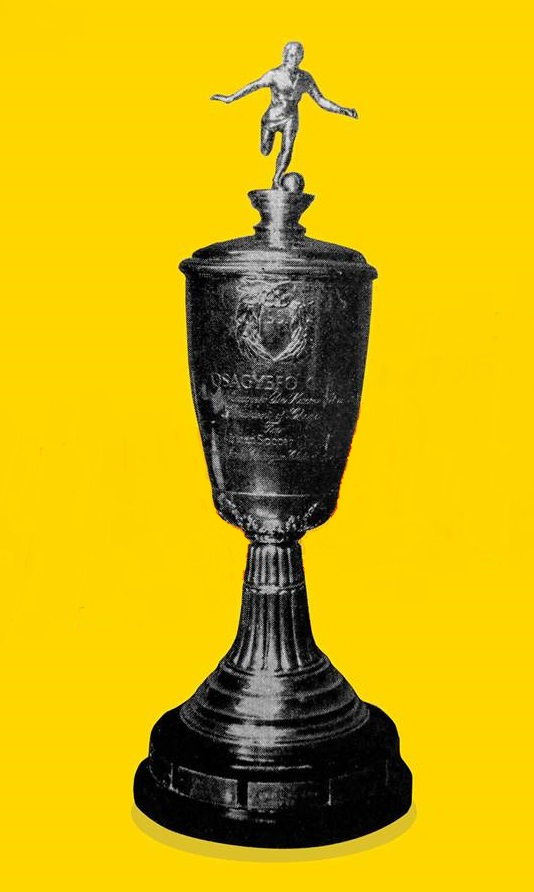
First trophy: Kwame Nkrumah Cup (1965–1977)

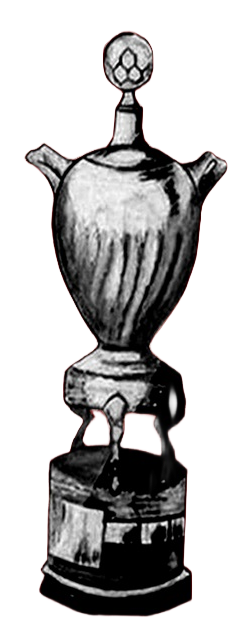
Second trophy: Ahmed Sékou Touré Cup (1978–1993)

== Prizes ==
=== Trophy and medals ===
Each year, the winning team is presented with the CAF Champions League, the current version of which has been awarded since the competition name change in 1997. Forty gold medals are presented to the competition winners and 40 silver medals to the runners-up. On May 22, 2025, CAF unveiled a striking new design for the TotalEnergies CAF Champions League trophy at TotalEnergies' Johannesburg headquarters. Crafted in sleek silver with bold gold accents, the trophy features a golden sphere adorned with African motifs at its peak—symbolizing the ultimate triumph—while the alternating silver and gold lines reflect unity, rivalry, and competitive balance that define Africa's premier club competition. The update is part of CAF's broader effort to modernize its competitions and enhance their appeal.

=== 1997–2008 ===
Following the competition rebranding to its current name in 1997, CAF introduced prize money for the eight participants in the group stage for the first time in an African club football competition. This first tranche lasted until 2008.

Final position	Prize money
Champions	US$1,000,000
Runners-up	US$750,000
Semi-finalists	US$427,500
3rd in group stage	US$261,250
4th in group stage	US$190,000

=== 2009–2016 ===
CAF increased prize money to be shared between the group stage clubs (8 teams at the time) as follows:

Final position	Prize money
Champions	US$1,500,000
Runners-up	US$1,000,000
Semi-finalists	US$700,000
3rd in group stage	US$500,000
4th in group stage	US$400,000

=== 2017–2022 ===
This third tranche of prize money from CAF showed an overall increase to be shared between the group stage clubs, which expanded from 8 to 16 teams starting in 2017:

Final position	Prize money
Champions	US$2,500,000
Runners-up	US$1,250,000
Semi-finalists	US$875,000
Quarter-finalists	US$650,000
3rd in group stage	US$550,000
4th in group stage	US$550,000

* Note: National Associations receive an additional equivalent share of 5% for each amount awarded to clubs.

=== 2023–2025 ===
On 16 August 2024, CAF announced an increase in prize money to be shared between the 16 group stage clubs as well as preliminary rounds participants:

Final position	Prize money
Champions	US$4,000,000
Runners-up	US$2,000,000
Semi-finalists	US$1,200,000
Quarter-finalists	US$900,000
3rd in group stage	US$700,000
4th in group stage	US$700,000
Preliminary Stages	US$50,000

=== 2026–present ===
In March 2026, further increases were announced by CAF President Patrice Motsepe:

Final position	Prize money
Champions	US$6,000,000
Runners-up	US$2,000,000
Semi-finalists	US$1,200,000
Quarter-finalists	US$900,000
3rd in group stage	US$700,000
4th in group stage	US$700,000
Preliminary Stages	US$100,000

== Broadcast coverage ==
Below are the official broadcast rights holders for the competition:

Country/Region	Channels
Algeria	EPTV
ASEAN	beIN Sports
Benin	ORTB
Burkina Faso	RTB
Europe	Sportfive
France	beIN Sports
Ghana	GTV Sports+; StarTimes
Morocco	Arryadia
Mozambique	SuperSport
Portugal	Sport TV
Latin America	ESPN
Nigeria	SuperSport
(Arab League) MENA	beIN Sports
South Africa	SuperSport; SABC Sport
Serbia; Croatia; Bosnia and Herzegovina; Montenegro	Arena Sport
United States	beIN Sports
Sub-Saharan Africa	Canal+; SuperSport (selected matches); StarTimes (except South Africa)
East Africa	TVZ; ZBC

== Records and statistics ==
=== Performance by club ===
Performance in the African Cup and CAF Champions League by club
Club	Titles	Runners-up	Seasons won	Seasons runner-up
(Egypt) Al Ahly	12	5	1982, 1987, 2001, 2005, 2006, 2008, 2012, 2013, 2020, 2021, 2023, 2024	1983, 2007, 2017, 2018, 2022
(Egypt) Zamalek	5	3	1984, 1986, 1993, 1996, 2002	1994, 2016, 2020
(Democratic Republic of the Congo) TP Mazembe	5	2	1967, 1968, 2009, 2010, 2015	1969, 1970
(Tunisia) ES Tunis	4	5	1994, 2011, 2018, 2019	1999, 2000, 2010, 2012, 2024
(Morocco) Wydad AC	3	3	1992, 2017, 2022	2011, 2019, 2023
(Guinea) Hafia FC	3	2	1972, 1975, 1977	1976, 1978
(Morocco) Raja CA	3	1	1989, 1997, 1999	2002
(Cameroon) Canon Yaoundé	3	0	1971, 1978, 1980	—
(Ghana) Asante Kotoko	2	5	1970, 1983	1967, 1971, 1973, 1982, 1993
(South Africa) Mamelodi Sundowns	2	2	2016, 2026	2001, 2025
(Algeria) JS Kabylie	2	0	1981, 1990	—
(Algeria) ES Sétif	2	0	1988, 2014	—
(Nigeria) Enyimba	2	0	2003, 2004	—
(Democratic Republic of the Congo) Vita Club	1	2	1973	1981, 2014
(Ghana) Hearts of Oak	1	2	2000	1977, 1979
(Tunisia) ES Sahel	1	2	2007	2004, 2005
(Egypt) Ismaily	1	1	1969	2003
(Morocco) AS FAR	1	1	1985	2026
(South Africa) Orlando Pirates	1	1	1995	2013
(Ivory Coast) ASEC Mimosas	1	1	1998	1995
(Cameroon) Oryx Douala	1	0	1965	—
(Ivory Coast) Stade d'Abidjan	1	0	1966	—
(Republic of the Congo) CARA Brazzaville	1	0	1974	—
(Algeria) MC Alger	1	0	1976	—
(Cameroon) Union Douala	1	0	1979	—
(Tunisia) Club Africain	1	0	1991	—
(Egypt) Pyramids	1	0	2025	—
(Democratic Republic of the Congo) AS Bilima	0	2	—	1980, 1985
(Sudan) Al-Hilal	0	2	—	1987, 1992
(Nigeria) Shooting Stars	0	2	—	1984, 1996
(Nigeria) Heartland	0	2	—	1988, 2009
(Mali) Stade Malien	0	1	—	1965
(Mali) Real Bamako	0	1	—	1966
Étoile Filante du Togo	0	1	—	1968
(Uganda) Simba FC	0	1	—	1972
(Egypt) Ghazl Al-Mehalla	0	1	—	1974
(Nigeria) Enugu Rangers	0	1	—	1975
(Ivory Coast) Africa Sports	0	1	—	1986
(Algeria) MC Oran	0	1	—	1989
(Zambia) Nkana FC	0	1	—	1990
(Uganda) SC Villa	0	1	—	1991
(Ghana) Ashanti Gold	0	1	—	1997
(Zimbabwe) Dynamos FC	0	1	—	1998
(Tunisia) CS Sfaxien	0	1	—	2006
(Cameroon) Coton Sport	0	1	—	2008
(Algeria) USM Alger	0	1	—	2015
(South Africa) Kaizer Chiefs	0	1	—	2021

=== Performance by nation ===
Performances in finals by nation
Nation	Winners	Runners-up	Total
Egypt	19	10	29
Morocco	7	5	12
Tunisia	6	8	14
DR Congo	6	6	12
Algeria	5	2	7
Cameroon	5	1	6
Ghana	3	8	11
South Africa	3	4	7
Guinea	3	2	5
Nigeria	2	5	7
Ivory Coast	2	2	4
Congo	1	0	1
Mali	0	2	2
Uganda	0	2	2
Sudan	0	2	2
Togo	0	1	1
Zambia	0	1	1
Zimbabwe	0	1	1

=== Performances by region ===
Federation (Region)	Clubs	Titles
UNAF (North Africa)	Al Ahly (12), Zamalek (5), Espérance de Tunis (4), Wydad AC (3), Raja CA (3), ES Sétif (2), JS Kabylie (2), Étoile du Sahel (1), Ismaily (1), MC Alger (1), FAR Rabat (1), Club Africain (1), Pyramids (1)	37
UNIFFAC (Central Africa)	TP Mazembe (5), Canon Yaoundé (3), CARA Brazzaville (1), Oryx Douala (1), Union Douala (1), Vita Club (1)	12
WAFU (West Africa)	Hafia (3), Asante Kotoko (2), Enyimba (2), ASEC Mimosas (1), Hearts of Oak (1), Stade d'Abidjan (1)	10
COSAFA (Southern Africa)	Mamelodi Sundowns (2), Orlando Pirates (1)	3
CECAFA (East Africa)	—	0

== Notable controversies ==
=== 2019 Final VAR controversy ===
The second leg of the 2019 final between Espérance Sportive de Tunis and Wydad AC at the Stade Olympique de Radès ended in unprecedented controversy. In the 59th minute, Wydad midfielder Walid El Karti scored an equalizer that was ruled out for offside. The referee was unable to review the decision because the VAR system was non-functional due to a technical failure before kick-off, a situation the teams were not informed of prior to the match. However, Espérance captain Khalil Chemmam later stated that the referee had informed both captains, but that it seemed Wydad's captain did not understand French.

Wydad players walked off the pitch in protest and refused to resume play without a VAR review. After an hour and twenty minutes of interruption, referee Bakari Gassama declared Espérance the winners by forfeit. Although CAF initially ordered a replay at a neutral venue, the Court of Arbitration for Sport (CAS) overturned CAF's decision on appeal, confirming Espérance as official champions after ruling that Wydad's refusal to return constituted an abandonment of the match under CAF Disciplinary Regulations.

== See also ==
- African Football League
- CAF Women's Champions League
- CAF Confederation Cup
- CAF Super Cup
- African Cup Winners' Cup
- CAF Cup
