= 2008 CAF Champions League final =

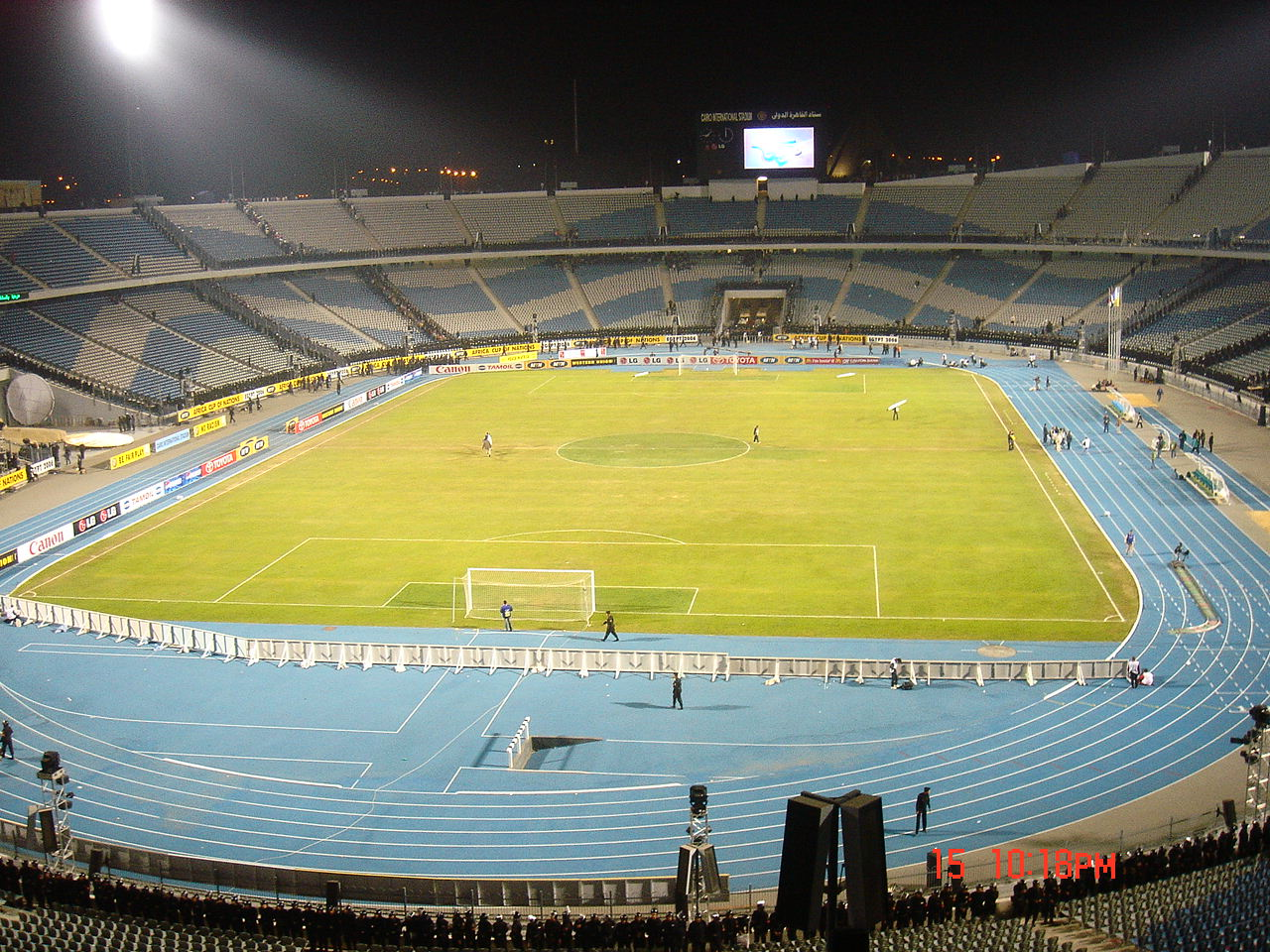
- Cairo International Stadium hosted the first leg of the final
- Event: 2008 CAF Champions League
Al Ahly	Coton Sport FC
(Egypt)	(Cameroon)
4	2

First leg
Al Ahly	Coton Sport FC
2	0
- Date: 2 November 2008
- Venue: Cairo International Stadium, Cairo
- Referee: Jerome Damon (South Africa)

Second Leg
Coton Sport FC	Al Ahly
2	2
- Date: 16 November 2008
- Venue: Roumdé Adjia Stadium, Garoua
- Referee: Djamel Haimoudi (Algeria)

The 2008 CAF Champions League final was a football tie held over two legs in December 2008 between Al-Ahly, and Coton Sport FC de Garoua.

== Qualified teams ==
In the following table, finals until 1996 were in the African Cup of Champions Club era, since 1997 were in the CAF Champions League era.

Team	Region	Previous finals appearances (bold indicates winners)
(Egypt) Al Ahly	UNAF (North Africa)	**1982**, 1983, **1987**, **2001**, **2005**, **2006**, 2007
(Cameroon) Coton Sport	UNIFFAC (Central Africa)	none

== Venues ==
=== Cairo International Stadium ===
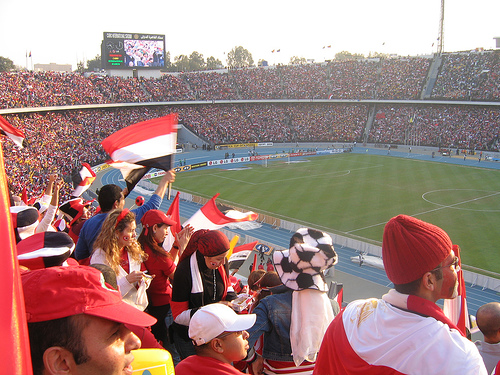
International Stadium in Cairo, Egypt hosted the second leg.

Cairo International Stadium, formerly known as Nasser Stadium, is an Olympic-standard, multi-use stadium with an all-seated capacity of 75,000. The architect of the stadium is the German Werner March, who had built from 1934 to 1936 the Olympic Stadium in Berlin. Before becoming an all seater stadium, it had the ability to hold over 100,000 spectators, reaching a record of 120,000. It is the foremost Olympic-standard facility befitting the role of Cairo, Egypt as the center of events in the region. It is also the 69th largest stadium in the world. Located in Nasr City; a suburb north east of Cairo, it was completed in 1960, and was inaugurated by President Gamal Abd El Nasser on 23 July that year, the eighth anniversary of the Egyptian Revolution of 1952. Zamalek SC currently use the Petro Sport Stadium for most of their home games and Al Ahly use Al Salam Stadium for most of their home games.

=== Roumdé Adjia Stadium ===
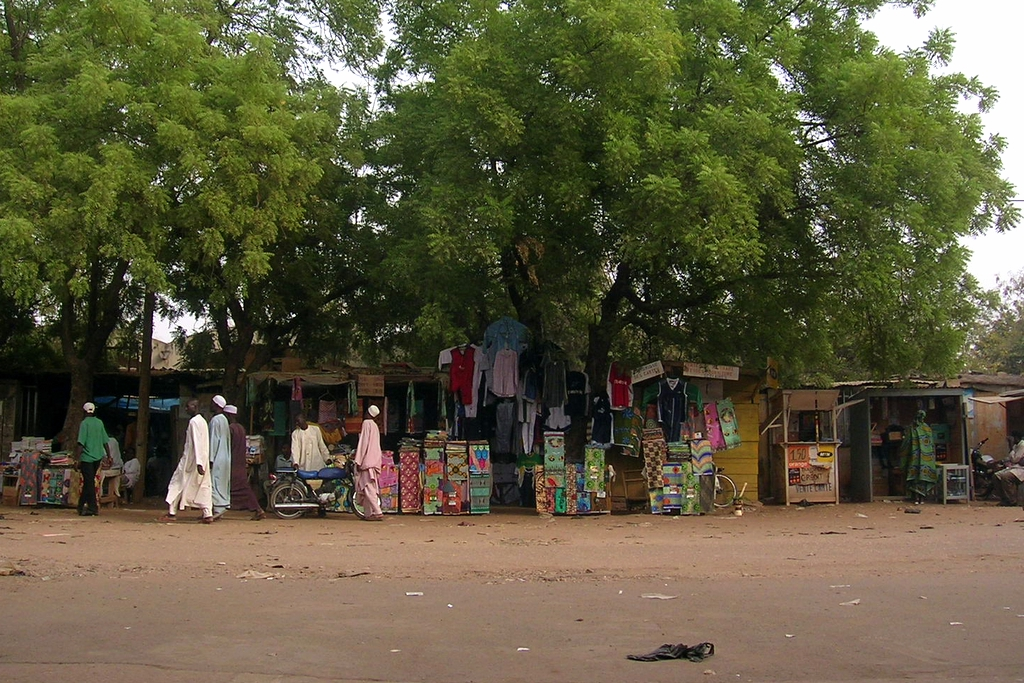
Garoua, Cameroon hosted the second leg.

Stade Roumdé Adjia is a multi-purpose stadium in Garoua, Cameroon. It is currently used mostly for football matches. It serves as a home ground of Cotonsport Garoua. The stadium holds 30,000 people and was built in 1978. The capacity is 22,000 people. This stadium is set to be one of the stadiums used in the African Cup of Nations in 2021. It'will be renovated by Mota-Engil.

== Road to final ==
(Egypt) Al Ahly				Round	(Cameroon) Coton Sport FC			
Opponent	Agg.	1st leg	2nd leg	Qualifying rounds	Opponent	Agg.	1st leg	2nd leg
Bye				Preliminary round	(Burundi) Vital'O FC	2–0	1–0 (A)	1–0 (H)
(Eritrea) Al Tahrir	6–0^{1}	3–0 (H)	3–0 (A)	First round	(Nigeria) Gombe United F.C.	6–2	5–0 (H)	1–2 (A)
(South Africa) Platinum Stars	3–2	0–1 (A)	1–0 (H)	Second round	(Algeria) JS Kabylie	4–2	3–0 (H)	1–2 (A)
Opponent	Result			Group stage	Opponent	Result		
(Egypt) Zamalek	2–1 (H)			Matchday 1	(Democratic Republic of the Congo) TP Mazembe	1–0 (H)		
(Ivory Coast) Africa Sports National	0–0 (A)			Matchday 2	(Nigeria) Enyimba	0–2 (A)		
(Zimbabwe) Dynamos	2–1 (H)			Matchday 3	(Sudan) Al Hilal	1–1 (A)		
(Zimbabwe) Dynamos	1–0 (A)			Matchday 4	(Sudan) Al Hilal	1–0 (H)		
(Egypt) Zamalek	2–2 (A)			Matchday 5	(Democratic Republic of the Congo) TP Mazembe	0–2 (A)		
(Ivory Coast) ASEC Mimosas	2–2 (H)			Matchday 6	(Nigeria) Enyimba	3–0 (H)		
Group A Winner: Pos / Team / Pld / W / D / L / GF / GA / GD / Pts / Qualification; **1** / (Egypt) Al Ahly / **6** / **3** / **3** / **0** / **9** / **6** / **+3** / **12** / **Advance to knockout stage**; 2 / (Zimbabwe) Dynamos / 6 / 3 / 0 / 3 / 6 / 6 / 0 / **9** / **Advance to knockout stage**; 3 / (Ivory Coast) ASEC Mimosas / 6 / 1 / 3 / 2 / 7 / 6 / +1 / **6**; 4 / (Egypt) Zamalek / 6 / 1 / 2 / 3 / 4 / 8 / −4 / **5**; Source:				Final standings	Group B Winner: Pos / Team / Pld / W / D / L / GF / GA / GD / Pts / Qualification; **1** / (Cameroon) Coton Sport / **6** / **3** / **1** / **2** / **6** / **5** / **+1** / **10** / **Advance to knockout stage**; 2 / (Nigeria) Enyimba / 6 / 3 / 0 / 3 / 10 / 10 / 0 / **9** / **Advance to knockout stage**; 3 / (Democratic Republic of the Congo) TP Mazembe / 6 / 2 / 2 / 2 / 7 / 5 / +2 / **8**; 4 / (Sudan) Al Hilal / 6 / 1 / 3 / 2 / 7 / 10 / −3 / **6**; Source:			
Opponent	Agg.	1st leg	2nd leg	Knock-out stage	Opponent	Agg.	1st leg	2nd leg
(Nigeria) Enyimba	1–0	0–0 (A)	1–0 (H)	Semifinals	(Zimbabwe) Dynamos	5–0	1–0 (A)	4–0 (H)

^{1}Al Tahrir of Eritrea withdrew because of an internal club problem.

== Format ==
The final was decided over two legs, with aggregate goals used to determine the winner. If the sides were level on aggregate after the second leg, the away goals rule would have been applied, and if still level, the tie would have proceeded directly to a penalty shootout (no extra time is played).

== Matches ==
=== First leg ===
2 November 2008
18:00 GMT

Al Ahly (Egypt)	2–0	(Cameroon) Coton Sport FC
Gomaa 4'; Flávio 15'	Report

Cairo International Stadium, Cairo
Referee: Jerome Damon (South Africa)

**Al-Ahly**	**Coton Sport**

Al-Ahly:
GK	**27**	(Egypt) Amir Abdelhamid
DF	**7**	(Egypt) Shady Mohamed
DF	**5**	(Egypt) Ahmad El-Sayed
DF	**26**	(Egypt) Wael Gomaa
DF	**6**	(Egypt) Ahmad Sedik		(substituted off) 74'
DF	**25**	(Egypt) Hossam Ashour	Booked
MF	**12**	(Angola) Gilberto		(substituted off) 78'
MF	**16**	(Egypt) Ahmed Hassan
MF	**8**	(Egypt) Mohamed Barakat
MF	**22**	(Egypt) Mohamed Aboutrika		(substituted off) 87'
FW	**23**	(Angola) Flávio		(substituted off) 90'
Substitutes:
MF	**11**	(Egypt) Sayed Moawad		(substituted on) 78'
FW	**17**	(Tunisia) Anis Boujelbene		(substituted on) 74'
MF	?	(Egypt) Osama Hosny		(substituted on) 90'
Manager:
(Portugal) Manuel José

Coton Sport:
GK	?	(Niger) Kassaly Daouda
DF	?	(Cameroon) Ahmadou Eboa Ngomna		(substituted off) 86'
DF	?	(Cameroon) Henri Minka	Booked
DF	?	(Cameroon) Haman Daouda
DF	?	(Cameroon) Sébastien Ndzana Kana
DF	?	(Cameroon) Makadji Boukar
MF	?	(Cameroon) Stéphane Kingué Mpondo
MF	**2**	(Niger) Karim Lancina
MF	?	(Cameroon) Ousmaïla Baba
FW	?	(Cameroon) Jacques Zoua		(substituted off) 75'
FW	?	(Niger) Kamilou Daouda
Substitutes:
MF	?	(Cameroon) André Ndame Ndame		(substituted on) 86'
FW	**10**	(Cameroon) Sanda Oumarou		(substituted on) 75'
Manager:
(Ivory Coast) Alain Ouombleon

Assistant referees:
Malebo Toko (South Africa)
Rezeers Andrew (South Africa)

=== Second leg ===
16 November 2008
14:00 GMT

Coton Sport FC (Cameroon)	2–2	(Egypt) Al Ahly
Lassina Abdoul Karim 45'; Ousmaïla Baba 63'	Report	Ahmed Hassan 38'; Shady 89'

Stade Omnisport de Garoua, Garoua
Referee: Djamel Haimoudi (Algeria)

**Coton Sport**	**Al-Ahly**

Coton Sport:
GK	?	(Niger) Kassaly Daouda
DF	?	(Cameroon) Henri Minka	Booked	(substituted off) 71'
DF	?	(Cameroon) Marcellin Gaha Djiadeu
DF	?	(Cameroon) Sébastien Ndzana Kana
DF	?	(Cameroon) Makadji Boukar
MF	?	(Cameroon) Stéphane Kingué Mpondo	Booked
MF	**2**	(Niger) Karim Lancina	Booked
MF	?	(Cameroon) Ousmaïla Baba
FW	**10**	(Cameroon) Sanda Oumarou		(substituted off) 81'
FW	?	(Cameroon) Jacques Zoua
FW	?	(Niger) Kamilou Daouda	Booked
Substitutes:
MF	?	(Cameroon) André Ndame Ndame		(substituted on) 71'
FW	?	(Niger) Fankélé Traoré		(substituted on) 81'
Manager:
(Ivory Coast) Alain Ouombleon

Al-Ahly:
GK	27	(Egypt) Amir Abdelhamid
DF	7	(Egypt) Shady Mohamed
DF	5	(Egypt) Ahmad El-Sayed
DF	26	(Egypt) Wael Gomaa	Booked
DF	6	(Egypt) Ahmad Sedik		(substituted off) 46'
DF	25	(Egypt) Hossam Ashour
MF	12	(Angola) Gilberto
MF	16	(Egypt) Ahmed Hassan		(substituted off) 65'
MF	8	(Egypt) Mohamed Barakat
MF	22	(Egypt) Mohamed Aboutrika		(substituted off) 75'
FW	23	(Angola) Flávio
Substitutes:
MF	11	(Egypt) Sayed Moawad		(substituted on) 46'
FW	17	(Tunisia) Anis Boujelbene		(substituted on) 65'
MF	24	(Egypt) Ahmed Fathy		(substituted on) 75'
Manager:
(Portugal) Manuel José

Assistant referees:
Ahmed Sedrati (Algeria)
Omari Bouabdallah (Algeria)

Coton Sport's captain, Ahmadou Ngomna was suspended for the second leg.
