= 2008 CAF Champions League group stage =

- Dates: 18 July – 21 September 2008

Tournament statistics
- Matches played: 24
- Goals scored: 56 (2.33 per match)

The group stage of the 2008 CAF Champions League was played from 18 July to 21 September 2008. A total of eight teams competed in the group stage, the group winners and runners-up advance to the Knockout stage playing semifinal rounds before the final.

== Format ==
In the group stage, each group was played on a home-and-away round-robin basis. The winners and the runners-up of each group advanced to the Knockout stage.

== Groups ==
Key to colours in group tables
Group winners and runners-up advance to the Knockout stage

=== Group A ===
Pos	Team	Pld	W	D	L	GF	GA	GD	Pts	Qualification
1	(Egypt) Al Ahly	6	3	3	0	9	6	+3	12	Advance to knockout stage
2	(Zimbabwe) Dynamos	6	3	0	3	6	6	0	9	Advance to knockout stage
3	(Ivory Coast) ASEC Mimosas	6	1	3	2	7	6	+1	6	
4	(Egypt) Zamalek	6	1	2	3	4	8	−4	5	

20 July 2008
17:30 GMT

Al Ahly (Egypt)	2–1	(Egypt) Zamalek
Flávio 28'; Ahmed Hassan 67'		Hamza 62'

Cairo Stadium, Cairo
Referee: Coffi Codjia (Benin)
20 July 2008
13:00 GMT

Dynamos (Zimbabwe)	2–1	(Ivory Coast) ASEC Mimosas
Sadomba 4' 73'		Wawa 30'

Rufaro Stadium, Harare
Referee: Divine Evehe (Cameroon)

2 August 2008
15:30 GMT

ASEC Mimosas (Ivory Coast)	0–0	(Egypt) Al Ahly

Stade Félix Houphouët-Boigny, Abidjan
Referee: Badara Diatta (Senegal)
3 August 2008
18:00 GMT

Zamalek (Egypt)	1–0	(Zimbabwe) Dynamos
El Safty 4'

Cairo Stadium, Cairo
Referee: Mohamed Benouza (Algeria)

17 August 2008
17:00 GMT

Al Ahly (Egypt)	2–1	(Zimbabwe) Dynamos
Barakat 3'; Aboutrika 93'		Lazarus Muhone 80'

Cairo Stadium, Cairo
16 August 2008
18:00 GMT

Zamalek (Egypt)	0–0	(Ivory Coast) ASEC Mimosas

Cairo Stadium, Cairo
Referee: Djamel Haimoudi (Algeria)

30 August 2008
12:30 GMT

Dynamos (Zimbabwe)	0–1	(Egypt) Al Ahly
		Barakat 10'

Rufaro Stadium, Harare
Referee: Lassina Paré (Burkina Faso)
31 August 2008
15:30 GMT

ASEC Mimosas (Ivory Coast)	3–0	(Egypt) Zamalek
Guindo 24'; Bamba 68'; N'Gossan 72'

Stade Félix Houphouët-Boigny, Abidjan
Referee: Kokou Djaoupe (Togo)

14 September 2008
20:00 GMT

Zamalek (Egypt)	2–2	(Egypt) Al Ahly
Hamza 40'; Agogo 51'		Flavio 9'; Aboutrika 70'

Cairo Stadium, Cairo
Referee: Eddy Maillet (Seychelles)
13 September 2008
15:30 GMT

ASEC Mimosas (Ivory Coast)	1–2	(Zimbabwe) Dynamos
Bi Cyriac Gohi 73'	Report	Philip Marufu 53'; Philip Marufu 96'

Stade Félix Houphouët-Boigny, Abidjan

21 September 2008
13:00 GMT

Dynamos (Zimbabwe)	1–0	(Egypt) Zamalek
David Shoko 90'

Rufaro Stadium, Harare
Referee: Alex Kotey (Ghana)
21 September 2008
20:00 GMT

Al Ahly (Egypt)	2–2	(Ivory Coast) ASEC Mimosas
Aboutrika 4'; Mahmoud Samir 76'		Ladji Kone 5'; Cyriac Gohi Bi 78'

Military Academy Stadium, Cairo
Referee: Rajindraparsad Seechurn (Mauritius)

=== Group B ===
Pos	Team	Pld	W	D	L	GF	GA	GD	Pts	Qualification
1	(Cameroon) Coton Sport	6	3	1	2	6	5	+1	10	Advance to knockout stage
2	(Nigeria) Enyimba	6	3	0	3	10	10	0	9	Advance to knockout stage
3	(Democratic Republic of the Congo) TP Mazembe	6	2	2	2	7	5	+2	8	
4	(Sudan) Al Hilal	6	1	3	2	7	10	−3	6	

19 July 2008
14:30 GMT

Coton Sport (Cameroon)	1–0	(Democratic Republic of the Congo) TP Mazembe
Kamilou 90'

Stade Omnisports Roumde-Adja, Garoua
Referee: Koman Coulibaly (Mali)
18 July 2008
17:00 GMT

Al Hilal (Sudan)	3–2	(Nigeria) Enyimba
Mustafa 41'; Mohamed 47'; Ifeanyi 90'		Itodo 35'; Worgu 88'

AlHilal Stadium, Omdurman
Referee: Ahmed Auda (Egypt)

3 August 2008
15:00 GMT

Enyimba (Nigeria)	2–0	(Cameroon) Coton Sport
Otorogu 45+'; Worgu (2H)	Report

Enyimba International Stadium, Aba
Attendance: 25,000
Referee: Eddy Maillet (Seychelles)
2 August 2008
13:00 GMT

TP Mazembe (Democratic Republic of the Congo)	0–0	(Sudan) Al Hilal

Stade Municipal, Lubumbashi
Referee: Mathews Katjimune (Namibia)

15 August 2008
17:00 GMT

Al Hilal (Sudan)	1–1	(Cameroon) Coton Sport
Osunwa 25'		Ousmaila 76'

AlHilal Stadium, Omdurman
17 August 2008
14:30 GMT

Enyimba (Nigeria)	2–0	(Democratic Republic of the Congo) TP Mazembe
Otorogu 70'; Worgu 80'

Enyimba International Stadium, Aba
Attendance: 25,000

30 August 2008
15:00 GMT

Coton Sport (Cameroon)	1–0	(Sudan) Al Hilal
Ousmaila 62'

Stade Omnisports Roumde-Adja, Garoua
31 August 2008
13:00 GMT

TP Mazembe (Democratic Republic of the Congo)	3–0	(Nigeria) Enyimba
Luyeye 18'; Mputu 60'; Kabangu 80'	Report

Stade Municipal, Lubumbashi

14 September 2008
12:30 GMT

TP Mazembe (Democratic Republic of the Congo)	2–0	(Cameroon) Coton Sport
Mputu 02'; Dioko Kaluyituka 48'	Report

Stade Municipal, Lubumbashi
15 September 2008
14:00 GMT

Enyimba (Nigeria)	4–1	(Sudan) Al Hilal
Worgu 6'; Owoeri 60'; Otorogu (2H); Akueme (2H)	Report	Saif Eldin (red card) 40'; Muhanned 57'

Enyimba International Stadium, Aba

20 September 2008
15:00 GMT

Coton Sport (Cameroon)	3–0	(Nigeria) Enyimba
Ahmadou 39'; Kamilou 62'; Ousmaila 75'	Report; Report(french)	Saminou (red card) 14'

Stade Omnisports Roumde-Adja, Garoua
19 September 2008
20:00 GMT

Al Hilal (Sudan)	2–2	(Democratic Republic of the Congo) TP Mazembe
Muhannad El Tahir 2' 63'

AlHilal Stadium, Omdurman
