= 2008 CAF Champions League knockout stage =

The knockout stage of the 2008 CAF Champions League was played from 5 October to 16 November 2008.

== Bracket ==
Semi-Finals
1	(Nigeria) Enyimba	0	0	0
4	(Egypt) Al Ahly	0	1	1
3	(Zimbabwe) Dynamos	0	0	0
2	(Cameroon) Coton Sport	1	4	5

Final
(Egypt) Al Ahly	2	2	4
(Cameroon) Coton Sport	0	2	2

== Semi finals ==
The first legs were played on 5 October and the second legs on 17–19 October.

Team 1	Agg.	Team 2	1st leg	2nd leg
Enyimba (Nigeria)	0–1	(Egypt) Al Ahly	0–0	0–1
Dynamos (Zimbabwe)	0–5	(Cameroon) Coton Sport	0–1	0–4

5 October 2008
15:00 GMT

Enyimba FC (Nigeria)	0–0	(Egypt) Al Ahly
	Report

Enyimba International Stadium, Aba
Referee: Daniel Bennett (South Africa)
18 October 2008
18:30 GMT

Al Ahly (Egypt)	1–0	(Nigeria) Enyimba FC
Flávio 26'

Cairo International Stadium, Cairo
Referee: Mohammed Ssegonga (Uganda)

5 October 2008
13:00 GMT

Dynamos (Zimbabwe)	0–1	(Cameroon) Coton Sport
	Report	Kamilou 32'

Rufaro Stadium, Harare
Referee: Koman Coulibaly (Mali)
18 October 2008
14:30 GMT

Coton Sport (Cameroon)	4–0	(Zimbabwe) Dynamos
Koua 1'; Zoua 52'; Kamilou 65'; Ousmaïla Baba 76'	Report

Stade Omnisport de Garoua, Garoua
Referee: Kacem Bin Nasser (Tunisia)

== Final ==
Team 1	Agg.	Team 2	1st leg	2nd leg
Al Ahly (Egypt)	4–2	(Cameroon) Coton Sport	2–0	2–2

2 November 2008
18:00 GMT

Al Ahly (Egypt)	2–0	(Cameroon) Coton Sport
Gomaa 4'; Flávio 15'	Report

Cairo International Stadium, Cairo
Referee: Jerome Damon (South Africa)
16 November 2008
14:00 GMT

Coton Sport (Cameroon)	2–2	(Egypt) Al Ahly
Lassina Abdoul Karim 45'; Ousmaïla Baba 63'	Report	Ahmed Hassan 38'; Shady 89'

Stade Omnisport de Garoua, Garoua
Referee: Djamel Haimoudi (Algeria)
