= 1998 CAF Champions League group stage =

The group stage of the 1998 CAF Champions League was played from 22 August to 8 November 1998. A total of eight teams competed in the group stage.

== Format ==
In the group stage, each group was played on a home-and-away round-robin basis. The winners of each group advanced directly to the final.

== Groups ==
The matchdays were 22–23 August, 4–6 September, 19–20 September, 9–11 October, 24–25 October, and 7–8 November 1998.

Key to colours in group tables
Group winners advance to the final

=== Group A ===
Pos	Team	Pld	W	D	L	GF	GA	GD	Pts	Qualification
1	(Zimbabwe) Dynamos Harare	6	3	1	2	6	3	+3	10	Final
2	(Ghana) Hearts of Oak	6	3	1	2	7	6	+1	10	
3	(Tunisia) ES Sahel	6	3	0	3	11	7	+4	9	
4	(Nigeria) Eagle Cement	6	2	0	4	3	11	−8	6	

Rules for classification: Group stage tiebreakers
22 August 1998

ES Sahel (Tunisia)	2–1	(Ghana) Hearts of Oak

Stade Olympique de Sousse, Sousse
23 August 1998

Dynamos Harare (Zimbabwe)	3–0	(Nigeria) Eagle Cement

National Sports Stadium, Harare

5 September 1998

Eagle Cement (Nigeria)	2–1	(Tunisia) ES Sahel

Liberation Stadium, Port Harcourt
6 September 1998

Hearts of Oak (Ghana)	1–1	(Zimbabwe) Dynamos Harare

Accra Sports Stadium, Accra

19 September 1998

Dynamos Harare (Zimbabwe)	1–0	(Tunisia) ES Sahel

National Sports Stadium, Harare
19 September 1998

Eagle Cement (Nigeria)	1–0	(Ghana) Hearts of Oak

Liberation Stadium, Port Harcourt

11 October 1998

ES Sahel (Tunisia)	1–0	(Zimbabwe) Dynamos Harare

Stade Olympique de Sousse, Sousse
11 October 1998

Hearts of Oak (Ghana)	1–0	(Nigeria) Eagle Cement

Accra Sports Stadium, Accra

24 October 1998

Eagle Cement (Nigeria)	0–1	(Zimbabwe) Dynamos Harare

Liberation Stadium, Port Harcourt
25 October 1998

Hearts of Oak (Ghana)	3–2	(Tunisia) ES Sahel

Accra Sports Stadium, Accra

7 November 1998

ES Sahel (Tunisia)	5–0	(Nigeria) Eagle Cement

Stade Olympique de Sousse, Sousse
7 November 1998

Dynamos Harare (Zimbabwe)	0–1	(Ghana) Hearts of Oak

National Sports Stadium, Harare

=== Group B ===
Pos	Team	Pld	W	D	L	GF	GA	GD	Pts	Qualification
1	(Ivory Coast) ASEC Mimosas	6	4	1	1	10	4	+6	13	Final
2	(South Africa) Manning Rangers	6	3	1	2	9	6	+3	10	
3	(Morocco) Raja Casablanca	6	2	2	2	12	7	+5	8	
4	(Tanzania) Young Africans	6	0	2	4	5	19	−14	2	

Rules for classification: Group stage tiebreakers
22 August 1998

Young Africans (Tanzania)	1–1	(South Africa) Manning Rangers

National Stadium, Dar es Salaam
23 August 1998

Raja Casablanca (Morocco)	0–1	(Ivory Coast) ASEC Mimosas

Stade Mohammed V, Casablanca

4 September 1998

Manning Rangers (South Africa)	1–0	(Morocco) Raja Casablanca

Kings Park Soccer Stadium, Durban
6 September 1998

ASEC Mimosas (Ivory Coast)	2–1	(Tanzania) Young Africans

Stade Félix Houphouët-Boigny, Abidjan

18 September 1998

Raja Casablanca (Morocco)	6–0	(Tanzania) Young Africans

Stade Mohammed V, Casablanca
19 September 1998

ASEC Mimosas (Ivory Coast)	3–1	(South Africa) Manning Rangers

Stade Félix Houphouët-Boigny, Abidjan

9 October 1998

Manning Rangers (South Africa)	1–0	(Ivory Coast) ASEC Mimosas

Kings Park Soccer Stadium, Durban
10 October 1998

Young Africans (Tanzania)	3–3	(Morocco) Raja Casablanca

National Stadium, Dar es Salaam

24 October 1998

Manning Rangers (South Africa)	4–0	(Tanzania) Young Africans

Kings Park Soccer Stadium, Durban
25 October 1998

ASEC Mimosas (Ivory Coast)	1–1	(Morocco) Raja Casablanca

Stade Félix Houphouët-Boigny, Abidjan

8 November 1998

Young Africans (Tanzania)	0–3	(Ivory Coast) ASEC Mimosas

National Stadium, Dar es Salaam
8 November 1998

Raja Casablanca (Morocco)	2–1	(South Africa) Manning Rangers

Stade Mohammed V, Casablanca
