= Ahmadou Eboa Ngomna =

Cameroonian footballer (born 1983)

Ahmado Ngomna
Personal information
- Full name: Ahmadou Eboa Ngomna
- Date of birth: December 4, 1983 (age 42)
- Place of birth: Kaélé, Cameroon
- Height: 1.80 m (5 ft 11 in)
- Position: Defender

Senior career*
Years	Team	Apps	(Gls)
2000–2010	Cotonsport Garoua		
2010–2011	Sur Club		
2011	New Star de Douala		
2014–2015	Al-Kahrabaa FC		
- * Club domestic league appearances and goals

Ahmadou Eboa Ngomna (born December 4, 1983) is a Cameroonian former footballer.

== Career ==
Ngomna began playing football with Cotonsport Garoua, and made his Elite One debut during a one-year spell at Espérance Guider. He would return to Cotonsport where he played for 8 seasons in Elite One.

Ngomna played recently for Cameroonian side Cotonsport Garoua, and Sur Club in Oman.

With Cotonsport, Ngomna captained the club to the 2003 CAF Cup Final and the 2008 CAF Champions League Final. After the club's success in the 2008 CAF Champions League, Ngomna was one of several star players who looked for a transfer to a professional club abroad, but returned to Cotonsport without finalizing a transfer, going on to play in the 2009 CAF Champions League.

Ngomna ultimately secured a move to Omani side Sur Club, where he helped the club win the 2010–11 Oman First Division League championship, scoring as Sur won the final on penalties.

Ngomna played for Al-Kahrabaa FC in the Iraqi Premier League during the 2014–15 season.

Ngomna's older brother, Bouba, is a journalist for a Yaoundé radio station, leading to speculation that Ngomna wasn't selected for the Cameroon national football team due to his brother's criticism of the sports minister.
