= 1998 CAF Champions League =

Tournament details
- Dates: 30 January – 12 December
- Teams: 42 (from 42 associations)

Final positions
- Champions: (Ivory Coast) ASEC Mimosas (1st title)
- Runners-up: (Zimbabwe) Dynamos Harare

Tournament statistics
- Matches played: 87
- Goals scored: 155 (1.78 per match)

The 1998 CAF Champions League was the 34th awarding of Africa's premier club football tournament prize organized by the Confederation of African Football (CAF), and the 2nd edition under the current CAF Champions League format. ASEC Mimosas of Ivory Coast defeated Dynamos Harare of Zimbabwe in the final to win their first title.

== Qualifying rounds ==
=== Preliminary round ===
| Team 1 | Agg. | Team 2 | 1st leg | 2nd leg |
|---|---|---|---|---|
| St.-Michel United (Seychelles) | 2–8 | (Ethiopia) Ethiopian Coffee SC | 1–0 | 1–8 |
| Rayon Sport (Rwanda) | 6–1 | (Burundi) Maniema FC | 6–1 | w/o^{1} |
| Telecom Wanderers (Malawi) | 4–1 | (Botswana) BDF XI | 3–0 | 1–1 |
| Mbabane Swallows (Eswatini) | 1–6 | (Lesotho) LDF | 1–4 | 0–2 |
| Mdlaw Megbi (Eritrea) | 0–2 | (Kenya) Utalii | 0–1 | 0–1 |
| SS Saint-Louisienne (Réunion) | 1–3 | (Mauritius) Sunrise Flacq United | 1–2 | 0–1 |
| Deportivo Mongomo (Equatorial Guinea) | w/o^{2} | (Republic of the Congo) Muni Sport | – | – |
| Wallidan FC (The Gambia) | 0–2 | (Senegal) AS Douanes | 0–0 | 0–2 |
| Mogas 90 FC (Benin) | w/o^{2} | (Sierra Leone) East End Lions | – | – |
| Tourbillon FC (Chad) | w/o^{3} | (Central African Republic) AS Tempête Mocaf | – | – |

^{1} Maniema FC withdrew after the 1st leg.
^{2} Muni Sport and East End Lions both withdrew.
^{3} AS Tempête Mocaf were disqualified for not paying the entry fee.

=== First round ===
| Team 1 | Agg. | Team 2 | 1st leg | 2nd leg |
|---|---|---|---|---|
| Ethiopian Coffee SC (Ethiopia) | 3–3 (a) | (Egypt) Al Ahly | 1–1 | 2–2 |
| Rayon Sport (Rwanda) | 3–3 (a) | (Tanzania) Young Africans | 2–2 | 1–1 |
| Telecom Wanderers (Malawi) | 2–4 | (Zimbabwe) Dynamos Harare | 1–2 | 1–2 |
| Sunrise Flacq United (Mauritius) | 0–4 | (Mozambique) Ferroviário | 0–4 | 0–0 |
| KCC (Uganda) | 1–3 | (Zambia) Power Dynamos | 0–1 | 1–2 |
| LDF (Lesotho) | 4–5 | (South Africa) Manning Rangers | 3–3 | 1–2 |
| Utalii (Kenya) | 4–3 | (Sudan) Al-Merrikh | 4–0 | 0–3 |
| CI Kamsar (Guinea) | 3–5 | (Tunisia) ES Sahel | 1–2 | 2–3 |
| Deportivo Mongomo (Equatorial Guinea) | 3–13 | (Angola) Petro Atlético | 1–4 | 2–9 |
| Eagle Cement (Nigeria) | 4–3 | (Democratic Republic of the Congo) AS Vita Club | 4–1 | 0–2 |
| RC Bobo (Burkina Faso) | 2–4 | (Ivory Coast) ASEC Mimosas | 1–0 | 1–4 |
| Dynamic Lomé (Togo) | 5–9 | (Gabon) FC 105 Libreville | 3–3 | 2–6 |
| AS Douanes (Senegal) | 2–1 | (Algeria) CS Constantine | 2–1 | 0–0 |
| Mogas 90 FC (Benin) | 1–6 | (Morocco) Raja Casablanca | 0–0 | 1–6 |
| Tourbillon FC (Chad) | 1–4 | (Cameroon) Coton Sport FC | 0–0 | 1–4 |
| Djoliba AC (Mali) | 0–1 | (Ghana) Hearts of Oak | 0–0 | 0–1 |

=== Second round ===
| Team 1 | Agg. | Team 2 | 1st leg | 2nd leg |
|---|---|---|---|---|
| Ethiopian Coffee SC (Ethiopia) | 3–8 | (Tanzania) Young Africans | 2–2 | 1–6 |
| Dynamos Harare (Zimbabwe) | 2–1 | (Mozambique) Ferroviário | 1–1 | 1–0 |
| Power Dynamos (Zambia) | 0–4 | (South Africa) Manning Rangers | 0–2 | 0–2 |
| Utalii (Kenya) | 1–1 (2-4 p) | (Tunisia) ES Sahel | 1–0 | 0–1 |
| Petro Atlético (Angola) | 0–3 | (Nigeria) Eagle Cement | 0–1 | 0–2 |
| ASEC Mimosas (Ivory Coast) | 4–2 | (Gabon) FC 105 Libreville | 2–0 | 2–2 |
| AS Douanes (Senegal) | 1–2 | (Morocco) Raja Casablanca | 1–0 | 0–2 |
| Coton Sport FC (Cameroon) | 2–2 (a) | (Ghana) Hearts of Oak | 2–1 | 0–1 |

== Group stage ==
Key to colours in group tables
Group winners advance to the Knockout stage

=== Group A ===
| Pos | Team | Pld | W | D | L | GF | GA | GD | Pts | Qualification | DYN | HEA | ESS | EAG |
|---|---|---|---|---|---|---|---|---|---|---|---|---|---|---|
| 1 | (Zimbabwe) Dynamos Harare | 6 | 3 | 1 | 2 | 6 | 3 | +3 | 10 | Final | — | 0–1 | 1–0 | 3–0 |
| 2 | (Ghana) Hearts of Oak | 6 | 3 | 1 | 2 | 7 | 6 | +1 | 10 | | 1–1 | — | 3–2 | 1–0 |
| 3 | (Tunisia) ES Sahel | 6 | 3 | 0 | 3 | 11 | 7 | +4 | 9 | | 1–0 | 2–1 | — | 5–0 |
| 4 | (Nigeria) Eagle Cement | 6 | 2 | 0 | 4 | 3 | 11 | −8 | 6 | | 0–1 | 1–0 | 2–1 | — |

Rules for classification: Group stage tiebreakers

=== Group B ===
| Pos | Team | Pld | W | D | L | GF | GA | GD | Pts | Qualification | ASEC | MAN | RCA | YOU |
|---|---|---|---|---|---|---|---|---|---|---|---|---|---|---|
| 1 | (Ivory Coast) ASEC Mimosas | 6 | 4 | 1 | 1 | 10 | 4 | +6 | 13 | Final | — | 3–1 | 1–1 | 2–1 |
| 2 | (South Africa) Manning Rangers | 6 | 3 | 1 | 2 | 9 | 6 | +3 | 10 | | 1–0 | — | 1–0 | 4–0 |
| 3 | (Morocco) Raja Casablanca | 6 | 2 | 2 | 2 | 12 | 7 | +5 | 8 | | 0–1 | 2–1 | — | 6–0 |
| 4 | (Tanzania) Young Africans | 6 | 0 | 2 | 4 | 5 | 19 | −14 | 2 | | 0–3 | 1–1 | 3–3 | — |

Rules for classification: Group stage tiebreakers

== Final ==
28 November 1998
--:-- UTC+2

| Dynamos Harare (Zimbabwe) | 0–0 | (Ivory Coast) ASEC Mimosas |

National Sports Stadium, Harare
Attendance: 45,000
Referee: Karim Daho (Algeria)
12 December 1998
--:-- UTC+0

| ASEC Mimosas (Ivory Coast) | 4–2 | (Zimbabwe) Dynamos Harare |
|---|---|---|
| Camara 30', 38'; Sié 43'; Zaki 52' | | Phiri 60'; Owusu 81' |

Stade Félix Houphouët-Boigny, Abidjan
Attendance: 50,000
Referee: Mourad Daami (Tunisia)

== Top goalscorers ==
The top scorers from the 1998 CAF Champions League are as follows:

| Rank | Name | Team | Goals |
|---|---|---|---|
| 1 | (Ethiopia) Aseged Tesfaye | (Ethiopia) Ethiopian Coffee SC | 6 |
| 1 | (Morocco) Reda Ereyahi | (Morocco) Raja Casablanca | 6 |
| 3 | (Morocco) Mustapha Moustawdaa | (Morocco) Raja Casablanca | 4 |
| 4 | (Angola) Zico | (Angola) Petro Atlético | 3 |
| 4 | (Nigeria) Musa | (Nigeria) Eagle Cement | 3 |
