= Sanda Oumarou =

Cameroonian footballer (1982–2021)

Personal information
- Full name: Sanda Mallam Oumarou
- Date of birth: 6 November 1982
- Place of birth: Ngaoundéré, Cameroon
- Date of death: May 2021 (aged 38)
- Height: 1.82 m (6 ft 0 in)
- Position: Midfielder

Senior career*
Years	Team	Apps	(Gls)
2003–2005	Coton Sport		
2005–2007	Al Masry		
2007–2010	Coton Sport		
- * Club domestic league appearances and goals

Sanda Mallam Oumarou (6 November 1982 – May 2021) was a Cameroonian professional footballer who played as a midfielder for Coton Sport and Egyptian club Al Masry SC.

== Biography ==
Oumarou first played for Coton Sport FC de Garoua, with whom he reached the final of the 2003 CAF Cup.

He played for Egyptian club Al Masry SC between 2005 and 2007.

After returning to Coton Sport he helped the club to the final of the 2008 CAF Champions League.

He retired from playing in 2012 and became the coach of Cameroonian second-tier side Université FC de Ngaoundéré.

He died in May 2021 aged 38 after a long illness.

== Honours ==
Cotonsport Garoua

- CAF Champions League: runners-up 2008
- CAF Cup: 2003
