= Melody Wafawanaka =

Zimbabwean footballer (born 1983)

Nkanyiso Skizo
Personal information
- Full name: Nkanyiso Skizo Moyo
- Date of birth: 4 June 1983 (age 43)
- Place of birth: Gwanda, Matshetsheni Datata Village
- Height: 1.89 m (6 ft 2 in)
- Position: Defender

Youth career
- Datata Shinning stars: Nkashe Fc

Senior career*
Years	Team	Apps	(Gls)
2003-2004	Mhlangeni F.C.		
- Air Zimbabwe Jets F.C.
2008–2009	Black Rhinos F.C.		

International career
1998–2003	Zimbabwe	13	(0)
- * Club domestic league appearances and goals

Nkanyiso Moyo (born 4 June 1983) is a retired Zimbabwean football defender.
