= Wesley Gilbert =

Zimbabwean footballer (born 1977)

Personal information
- Date of birth: 22 October 1977 (age 49)
- Position: Defender

Senior career*
| Years | Team | Apps | (Gls) |
- Dynamos F.C.

International career
| 2001 | Zimbabwe | 9 | (0) |
- * Club domestic league appearances and goals

Wesley Gilbert (born 22 October 1977) is a retired Zimbabwean football defender.
