= 1984 African Cup of Champions Clubs =

Tournament details
- Teams: 39 (from 1 confederation)

Final positions
- Champions: (Egypt) Zamalek (1st title)
- Runners-up: (Nigeria) Shooting Stars

Tournament statistics
- Matches played: 66
- Goals scored: 175 (2.65 per match)
- Top scorer: (Nigeria) Felix Owolabi (5 goals)

The 1984 African Cup of Champions Clubs was the 20th edition of the annual international club football competition held in the CAF region (Africa), the African Cup of Champions Clubs. It determined that year's club champion of association football in Africa.

The tournament was played by 39 teams and was used a playoff scheme with home and away matches. Zamalek SC from Egypt won that final, and became for the first time CAF club champion.

== Preliminary round ==
Team 1	Agg.	Team 2	1st leg	2nd leg
Atlético Malabo (Equatorial Guinea)	3–6	(Angola) Primeiro de Maio	2–0	1–6
Desportivo Maputo (Mozambique)	2–1	(Eswatini) Manzini Wanderers	1–1	1–0
SC Kiyovu Sport (Rwanda)	w/o^{1}	(Malawi) ADMARC Tigers	—	—
Real Banjul (The Gambia)	0–2	(Guinea-Bissau) Sporting de Bissau	0–0	0–2
Real Republicans (Sierra Leone)	1–0	(Liberia) Invincible Eleven	1–0	0–0
Township Rollers (Botswana)	1–3	(Lesotho) LPF	0–2	1–1
US Ouagadougou (Republic of Upper Volta)	1–5	(Benin) Dragons de l'Ouémé	0–2	1–3

^{1} ADMARC Tigers withdrew.

== First round ==
Team 1	Agg.	Team 2	1st leg	2nd leg
Africa Sports (Ivory Coast)	4–5	(Togo) Semassi	2–1	2–4
Al-Hilal (Sudan)	1–2	(Somalia) Printing Agency	1–1	0–1
Al-Madina (Libya)	1–2	(Morocco) Maghreb Fès	0–0	1–2
Asante Kotoko (Ghana)	2–3	(Angola) Primeiro de Maio	1–1	1–2
FC 105 Libreville (Gabon)	8–2	(Central African Republic) Anges de Fatima	3–1	5–1
HTMF Mahajanga (Madagascar)	0–5	(Zimbabwe) Dynamos FC	0–3	w/o^{1}
JE Tizi Ouzou (Algeria)	3–1	(Sierra Leone) Real Republicans	1–0	2–1
KCC (Uganda)	9–3	(Mozambique) Desportivo Maputo	6–1	3–2
Nkana Red Devils (Zambia)	6–0	(Lesotho) LPF	5–0	1–0
Real Bamako (Mali)	2–4	(Benin) Dragons de l'Ouémé	2–2	0–2
SM Sanga Balende (Zaire)	6–2	(Rwanda) SC Kiyovu Sport	2–1	4–1
Shooting Stars (Nigeria)	2–1	(Senegal) SEIB Diourbel	2–0	0–1
Sporting de Bissau (Guinea-Bissau)	w/o^{2}	(Guinea) Hafia FC	—	—
Vital'O (Burundi)	1–3	(Cameroon) Tonnerre Yaoundé	1–0	0–3
Young Africans (Tanzania)	1–2	(Kenya) Gor Mahia	1–1	0–1
Zamalek (Egypt)	4–1	(Tunisia) CS Sfaxien	3–0	1–1

^{1} HTMF Mahajanga withdrew after 1st leg.
^{2} Hafia FC withdrew.

== Second round ==
Team 1	Agg.	Team 2	1st leg	2nd leg
JE Tizi Ouzou (Algeria)	w/o^{1}	(Guinea-Bissau) Sporting de Bissau	—	—
KCC (Uganda)	1–2	(Zimbabwe) Dynamos FC	0–0	1–2
Maghreb Fès (Morocco)	3–1	(Benin) Dragons de l'Ouémé	3–0	0–1
Primeiro de Maio (Angola)	2–2 (3–4 p)	(Togo) Semassi	2–0	0–2
Printing Agency (Somalia)	2–4	(Zambia) Nkana Red Devils	2–1	0–3
SM Sanga Balende (Zaire)	0–4	(Gabon) FC 105 Libreville	0–2	0–2^{2}
Shooting Stars (Nigeria)	4–4 (5–4 p)	(Cameroon) Tonnerre Yaoundé	4–0	0–4
Zamalek (Egypt)	1–0	(Kenya) Gor Mahia	1–0^{3}	n/p

^{1} Sporting de Bissau withdrew.
^{2} The second leg was abandoned in the 55th minute with FC 105 Libreville leading 2–0 after SM Sanga Balende walked off to protest the officiating: Sanga Balende were ejected from the competition and banned from CAF competitions for three years.
^{3} The first leg was abandoned in the 38th minute with Zamalek leading 1–0 after Gor Mahia's players attacked and threatened the match officials: the second leg was scratched and Zamalek SC qualified.

== Quarter-finals ==
Team 1	Agg.	Team 2	1st leg	2nd leg
Dynamos FC (Zimbabwe)	2–2 (2–3 p)	(Algeria) JE Tizi Ouzou	2–0	0–2
Maghreb Fès (Morocco)	2–5	(Nigeria) Shooting Stars	1–1	1–4
Nkana Red Devils (Zambia)	2–6	(Egypt) Zamalek	1–1	1–5
Semassi (Togo)	w/o^{1}	(Gabon) FC 105 Libreville	—	—

^{1} FC 105 Libreville were ejected from the competition for using an ineligible player in the 2nd round.

== Semi-finals ==
Team 1	Agg.	Team 2	1st leg	2nd leg
JE Tizi Ouzou (Algeria)	3–4	(Egypt) Zamalek	3–1	0–3
Shooting Stars (Nigeria)	6–3	(Togo) Semassi	5–1	1–2

== Final ==
23 November 1984
--:-- UTC+2

Zamalek (Egypt)	2–0	(Nigeria) Shooting Stars
Abdel Hamid 60', 70' (pen.)

Cairo Stadium, Cairo
Attendance: 120,000
Referee: Jean-Fidèle Diramba (Gabon)
8 December 1984
14:45 UTC+0

Shooting Stars (Nigeria)	0–1	(Egypt) Zamalek
		Ogbeyin Fawole 56' (o.g.)

Surulere Stadium, Lagos
Attendance: 90,000

== Champion ==
1984 African Cup of Champions Clubs winners
(Egypt)
Zamalek
First title

== Top scorers ==
The top scorers from the 1984 African Cup of Champions Clubs are as follows:

Rank	Name	Team	Goals
1	(Nigeria) Felix Owolabi	(Nigeria) Shooting Stars	5
2	(Egypt) Gamal Abdel Hamid	(Egypt) Zamalek	4
2	(Egypt) Nasr Ibrahim	(Egypt) Zamalek	4
4	(Egypt) Tarek Yehia	(Egypt) Zamalek	3
4	(Ghana) Emmanuel Quarshie	(Egypt) Zamalek	3
4	(Nigeria) Adebak Rotmi	(Nigeria) Shooting Stars	3
7	(Algeria) Ali Benlahcène	(Algeria) JE Tizi Ouzou	2
7	(Morocco) Abdeslam Bono	(Morocco) Maghreb Fès	2
