= Thomas Magorimbo =

Zimbabwean footballer (born 1985)

Personal information
- Date of birth: 28 July 1985 (age 41)
- Place of birth: Harare, Zimbabwe
- Position: Defender

Senior career*
Years	Team	Apps	(Gls)
–2008	Shooting Stars		
2009	Kiglon		
2010–2014	Dynamos		
2015	ZPC Kariba		
2016–2017	DSTV Rangers		

International career^{‡}
2015	Zimbabwe	3	(0)
- * Club domestic league appearances and goals as of 15 November 2020 ‡ National team caps and goals as of 15 November 2020

Thomas Magorimbo (born 28 July 1985) is a retired Zimbabwean football defender.
