= Harlington Shereni =

Zimbabwean footballer (born 1975)

Personal information
- Date of birth: 6 July 1975 (age 51)
- Place of birth: Chiredzi, Rhodesia
- Height: 1.86 m (6 ft 1 in)
- Position: Midfielder

Senior career*
Years	Team	Apps	(Gls)
1998–1999	Dynamos Harare		
1999–2003	SR Delémont		
2003–2004	FC Istres	14	(0)
2004–2007	En Avant Guingamp	71	(5)
2007–2010	FC Nantes	48	(7)
2008–2009	→ RC Strasbourg (loan)	26	(4)

International career
2004–2008	Zimbabwe	23	(5)
- * Club domestic league appearances and goals as of 20 March 2009

Harlington Shereni (born 6 July 1975) is a former Zimbabwean football midfielder.

== Career ==
Born in Chiredzi, Shereni was studying engineering at the Zimbabwe School of Aviation when he was signed by Dynamos Harare. He featured in the Dynamos' side that reached the 1998 CAF Champions League Final.

Prior to the end of the 2007 season it was confirmed by Sherini that he would not look to extend his contract at En Avant Guingamp beyond the summer and felt it was time to move on. This was met by great disappointment by the fans as he had been the rock in the centre of midfield for three years. Just a few days before his contract was to end in June Harlington announced he would be signing a one-year extension due to his love for the club and its fans. The Guingamp board thought it unnecessary to draw up the contract right away as they believed Shereni was true to his word. Under a week later FC Nantes announced Shereni had signed for them on a free transfer, causing many fans of En Avant Guingamp to question his loyalty and sources of motivation.

== International ==
On 29 May 2008 Shereni was named in the 18 men roster, to face Guinea on 06/01/08 for the first time in three years by new coach Valinhos.

Shereni retired from international football in October 2008.
