= 2008 CAF Champions League =

African Champions League

Tournament details
- Dates: 15 February – 16 November
- Teams: 58

Final positions
- Champions: (Egypt) Al Ahly (6th title)
- Runners-up: (Cameroon) Coton Sport

Tournament statistics
- Matches played: 110
- Goals scored: 281 (2.55 per match)
- Top scorer(s): (Nigeria) Stephen Worgu (13 goals)

The 2008 CAF Champions League was the 44th edition of the CAF Champions League, the Africa's premier club football tournament prize organized by the Confederation of African Football (CAF). Al Ahly of Egypt defeated Coton Sport of Cameroon in the final to win their record-breaking sixth title.

== Qualifying rounds ==
=== Preliminary round ===
The preliminary round first legs were played on 15–17 February, and the second legs were played on 29 February-2 March 2008.^{4}

Team 1	Agg.	Team 2	1st leg	2nd leg
ASC SNIM (Mauritania)	1–7	(Algeria) ES Setif	1–5	0–2
SC de Bissau (Guinea-Bissau)	0–4	(Morocco) Olympique Khouribga	0–2	0–2
Invincible Eleven (Liberia)	w/o^{1}	(Guinea) AS Kaloum Star		
Renacimiento FC (Equatorial Guinea)	2–4	(Angola) Interclube	1–2	1–2
FAR Rabat (Morocco)	3–3 (4–5 p)	(Cape Verde) Sporting Clube da Praia	3–0	0–3
Tonnerre d'Abomey FC (Benin)	0–3	(Ivory Coast) Africa Sports National	0–0	0–3
APR FC (Rwanda)	1–4	(Egypt) Zamalek	1–2	0–2
AS Douanes (Senegal)	3–2	(Burkina Faso) Commune FC	0–0	3–2
Costa do Sol (Mozambique)	2–1	(Madagascar) Ajesaia	2–0	0–1
Royal Leopards (Eswatini)	0–3	(Zimbabwe) Dynamos	0–1	0–2
Sahel SC (Niger)	2–6	(Ghana) Ashanti Gold SC	1–0	1–6
DC Motema Pembe (Democratic Republic of the Congo)	2–2 (1–4 p)	(Nigeria) Gombe United F.C.	2–0	0–2
Vital'O FC (Burundi)	0–2	(Cameroon) Coton Sport FC	0–1	0–1
FC 105 Libreville (Gabon)	4–3	(Ghana) Hearts of Oak SC	3–0	1–3
Renaissance FC (Chad)	0-3	(Democratic Republic of the Congo) TP Mazembe	0-3^{2}	n/p
Stade Malien (Mali)	1–2	(Angola) Primeiro de Agosto	1–2	0–0
ASC Saloum (Senegal)	1–3	(Tunisia) Club Africain	1–2	0–1
ASKO Kara (Togo)	4-1	(Cameroon) US Douala	3–1	1–0
Simba SC (Tanzania)	4–1	(Ethiopia) Awassa City FC	3–0	1–1
Enyimba FC (Nigeria)	7–3	(Republic of the Congo) CSMD Diables Noirs	4–1	3–2
Tusker FC (Kenya)	w/o	(Eritrea) Al Tahrir	^{3}	
US Stade Tamponnaise (Réunion)	4–1	(Seychelles) St Michel United	3–1	1–0
Platinum Stars (South Africa)	4–1	Lesotho Correctional Services	4–0	0–1
Curepipe Starlight SC (Mauritius)	2–1	(Comoros) Coin Nord	2–0	0–1
Miembeni SC (Zanzibar)	0–5	(South Africa) Mamelodi Sundowns	0–1	0–4
Uganda Revenue Authority SC	0–2	(Zambia) ZESCO United Football Club	0–2	0–0

Byes: ASEC Mimosas, Etoile du Sahel, JS Kabylie, Al Ittihad, Al Ahly, and Al Hilal.

^{1} Invincible Eleven withdrew.
^{2} CAF ordered that the tie was to be played over one leg in Kinshasa due to the civil war in Chad, but Renaissance FC objected to the ruling and refused to travel; they were ejected from the competition, fined $4000 and banned from CAF competitions for three years.
^{3} Tusker FC were ejected from the competition and fined $5000 after Kenyan immigration officials refused the appointed match officials for the first leg entry into the country.
^{4} Wallidan FC and FC Civics withdrew before the draw.

Note: Clubs from the Central African Republic, Djibouti, Kenya, Liberia, Malawi, São Tomé and Príncipe, Sierra Leone and Somalia all had their entries rejected for failure to fulfil their financial obligations.

=== First round ===
The 1/16 Finals first leg matches were played on 21–23 March and the second legs were played on 4–6 April 2008.

Team 1	Agg.	Team 2	1st leg	2nd leg
Olympique Khouribga (Morocco)	2–2 (3–0 p)	(Algeria) ES Setif	2–0	0–2
ASEC Mimosas (Ivory Coast)	2–1	(Guinea) AS Kaloum Star	1–1	1–0
Sporting Clube da Praia (Cape Verde)	2–2 (a)	(Angola) Interclube	2–1	0–1
Zamalek (Egypt)	2–2 (5–4p)	(Ivory Coast) Africa Sports National	2–0	0–2
Etoile du Sahel (Tunisia)	5–3	(Senegal) AS Douanes	5–0	0–3
Dynamos (Zimbabwe)	4–2	(Mozambique) Costa do Sol	3–0	1–2
JS Kabylie (Algeria)	3–0	(Ghana) Ashanti Gold SC	3–0	0–0
Coton Sport FC (Cameroon)	6–2	(Nigeria) Gombe United F.C.	5–0	1–2
TP Mazembe (Democratic Republic of the Congo)	2–1	(Gabon) FC 105 Libreville	1–1	1–0
Al Ittihad Tripoli (Libya)	2–2 (a)	(Angola) 1º de Agosto	1–0	1–2
ASKO Kara (Togo)	2–4	(Tunisia) Club Africain	2–0	0–4
Enyimba FC (Nigeria)	7–1	(Tanzania) Simba SC	4–0	3–1
Al Ahly (Egypt)	6–0^{1}	(Eritrea) Al Tahrir	3–0	3–0
Platinum Stars (South Africa)	3–1	(Réunion) US Stade Tamponnaise	2–0	1–1
Mamelodi Sundowns (South Africa)	4–0	(Mauritius) Curepipe Starlight SC	3–0	1–0
Al Hilal (Sudan)	3–1	(Zambia) ZESCO United Football Club	2–0	1–1

^{1}Al Tahrir withdrew due to internal dissent.

=== Second round ===
The 1/8 Finals first legs were played on 25–27 April and the second legs were played on 9–11 May 2008.

Team 1	Agg.	Team 2	1st leg	2nd leg
ASEC Mimosas (Ivory Coast)	(a) 1–1	(Morocco) Olympique Khouribga	0–0	1–1
Zamalek (Egypt)	4–2	(Angola) Interclube	3–0	1–2
Dynamos (Zimbabwe)	2–0	(Tunisia) Etoile du Sahel	1–0	1–0
Coton Sport FC (Cameroon)	4–2	(Algeria) JS Kabylie	3–0	1–2
Al Ittihad Tripoli (Libya)	2–3	(Democratic Republic of the Congo) TP Mazembe	2–1	0–2
Enyimba FC (Nigeria)	6–3	(Tunisia) Club Africain	5–1	1–2
Platinum Stars (South Africa)	2–3	(Egypt) Al Ahly	2–1	0–2
Al Hilal (Sudan)	4–3	(South Africa) Mamelodi Sundowns	4–2	0–1

== Group stage ==
Key to colours in group tables
Group winners and runners-up advance to the Knockout stage

=== Group A ===
Pos	Team	Pld	W	D	L	GF	GA	GD	Pts	Qualification	AHL	DYN	ASEC	ZAM
1	(Egypt) Al Ahly	6	3	3	0	9	6	+3	12	Advance to knockout stage	—			
2	(Zimbabwe) Dynamos	6	3	0	3	6	6	0	9	Advance to knockout stage		—		
3	(Ivory Coast) ASEC Mimosas	6	1	3	2	7	6	+1	6				—	
4	(Egypt) Zamalek	6	1	2	3	4	8	−4	5					—

=== Group B ===
Pos	Team	Pld	W	D	L	GF	GA	GD	Pts	Qualification	COT	ENY	TPM	HIL
1	(Cameroon) Coton Sport	6	3	1	2	6	5	+1	10	Advance to knockout stage	—			
2	(Nigeria) Enyimba	6	3	0	3	10	10	0	9	Advance to knockout stage		—		
3	(Democratic Republic of the Congo) TP Mazembe	6	2	2	2	7	5	+2	8				—	
4	(Sudan) Al Hilal	6	1	3	2	7	10	−3	6					—

== Knockout stage ==
=== Bracket ===
Semi-finals
1	(Nigeria) Enyimba	0	0	0
4	(Egypt) Al Ahly	0	1	1
3	(Zimbabwe) Dynamos	0	0	0
2	(Cameroon) Coton Sport	1	4	5

Final
(Egypt) Al Ahly	2	2	4
(Cameroon) Coton Sport	0	2	2

=== Semifinals ===
The first legs were played on 5 October and the second legs on 17–19 October.

Team 1	Agg.	Team 2	1st leg	2nd leg
Enyimba (Nigeria)	0–1	(Egypt) Al Ahly	0–0	0–1
Dynamos (Zimbabwe)	0–5	(Cameroon) Coton Sport	0–1	0–4

=== Final ===
2 November 2008
18:00 GMT

Al Ahly (Egypt)	2–0	(Cameroon) Coton Sport
Gomaa 4'; Flávio 15'	Report

Cairo International Stadium, Cairo
Referee: Jerome Damon (South Africa)
16 November 2008
14:00 GMT

Coton Sport (Cameroon)	2–2	(Egypt) Al Ahly
Lassina Abdoul Karim 45'; Ousmaïla Baba 63'	Report	Ahmed Hassan 38'; Shady 89'

Stade Omnisport de Garoua, Garoua
Referee: Djamel Haimoudi (Algeria)

== Top goalscorers ==
The top scorers from the 2008 CAF Champions League are as follows:

Rank	Name	Team	Goals
1	(Nigeria) Stephen Worgu	(Nigeria) Enyimba	13
2	(Niger) Daouda Kamilou	(Cameroon) Coton Sport	7
3	(Cameroon) Ousmaïla Baba	(Cameroon) Coton Sport	6
4	(Angola) Flávio	(Egypt) Al Ahly	5
4	(Nigeria) Ezenwa Otorogu	(Nigeria) Enyimba	5
4	(Zimbabwe) Edward Sadomba	(Zimbabwe) Dynamos Harare	5
7	(Democratic Republic of the Congo) Ghislain Mvete Luyeye	(Democratic Republic of the Congo) TP Mazembe	4
7	(Egypt) Gamal Hamza	(Egypt) Zamalek	4
7	(Nigeria) Kalu Uche	(Nigeria) Enyimba	4
7	(Nigeria) Kelechi Osunwa	(Sudan) Al Hilal	4
7	(Sudan) Muhannad El Tahir	(Sudan) Al Hilal	4
7	(South Africa) Surprise Moriri	(South Africa) Mamelodi Sundowns	4

== See also ==
- 2008 FIFA Club World Cup
