= Champions League 2008 =

Champions League 2008 may refer to:

- AFC Champions League 2008
- CAF Champions League 2008
