= Edmore Dube =

Zimbabwean footballer (born 1975)

Personal information
- Date of birth: 5 October 1975 (age 51)
- Position: Forward

Senior career*
Years	Team	Apps	(Gls)
–2003	Highlanders F.C.		
2004	Black Rhinos F.C.		

International career
2001	Zimbabwe	3	(0)
- * Club domestic league appearances and goals

Edmore Dube (born 5 October 1975) is a retired Zimbabwean football striker.
