= 1985 African Cup of Champions Clubs =

Tournament details
- Teams: 37 (from 1 confederation)

Final positions
- Champions: (Morocco) FAR Rabat (1st title)
- Runners-up: (Zaire) AS Bilima

Tournament statistics
- Matches played: 65
- Goals scored: 170 (2.62 per match)
- Best player: (Morocco) Mohamed Timoumi

The 1985 African Cup of Champions Clubs was the 21st edition of the annual international club football competition held in the CAF region (Africa), the African Cup of Champions Clubs. It determined that year's club champion of association football in Africa.

37 teams played in the tournament. The tournament consisted of six rounds of two-legged matches. FAR Rabat from Morocco won the final and became for the first time CAF club champion.

== Preliminary round ==
Team 1	Agg.	Team 2	1st leg	2nd leg
ASC Garde Nationale (Mauritania)	3–1	(Guinea-Bissau) Sporting de Bissau	1–0	2–1
Ground Force (Ethiopia)	1–4	(Burundi) Vital'O	1–2	0–2
Mbabane Highlanders (Eswatini)	4–3	(Lesotho) LPF	4–1	0–2
Petro Atlético (Angola)	5–2	(Central African Republic) AS Tempête Mocaf	4–1	1–1
Ports Authority (The Gambia)	w/o^{1}	(Burkina Faso) USFA	—	—

^{1} USFA Ouagadougou withdrew on the morning of the first leg.

== First round ==
Team 1	Agg.	Team 2	1st leg	2nd leg
AS Bilima (Zaire)	4–0	(Botswana) Township Rollers	3–0	1–0
AS Kaloum Star (Guinea)	3–2	(Sierra Leone) Real Republicans	1–0	2–2
OC Agaza (Togo)	1–3	(Republic of the Congo) CARA Brazzaville	0–1	1–2
Black Rhinos (Zimbabwe)	4–1	(Eswatini) Mbabane Highlanders	1–0	3–1
CA Bizertin (Tunisia)	2–1	(Mauritania) ASC Garde Nationale	1–0	1–1
Enugu Rangers (Nigeria)	4–1	(Angola) Petro Atlético	2–0	2–1
FAR Rabat (Morocco)	10–0	(The Gambia) Ports Authority	8–0	w/o^{1}
GCR Mascara (Algeria)	4–3	(Libya) Al-Ittihad	4–0	0–3
Invincible Eleven (Liberia)	4–1^{2}	(Mali) Stade Malien	3–0	1–1
Lions de l'Atakory (Benin)	0–4	(Ghana) Hearts of Oak	0–1	0–3
SC Villa (Uganda)	4–4 (a)	(Sudan) Al-Hilal	4–2	0–2
Power Dynamos (Zambia)	6–1	(Tanzania) KMKM FC	4–0	2–1
Scarlets (Nakuru) (Kenya)	2–2 (a)	(Burundi) Vital'O	2–1	0–1
Stella d'Abidjan (Ivory Coast)	1–4	(Senegal) US Gorée	1–1	0–3
Tonnerre Yaoundé (Cameroon)	2–2 (a)	(Gabon) AS Sogara	2–1	0–1
Zamalek (Egypt)	w/o^{3}	(Somalia) Marine Club	—	—

^{1} Ports Authority withdrew after the first leg.
^{2} Invincible Eleven were ejected from the competition for fielding an ineligible player.
^{3} Marine Club withdrew.

== Second round ==
Team 1	Agg.	Team 2	1st leg	2nd leg
AS Bilima (Zaire)	2–1	(Republic of the Congo) CARA Brazzaville	1–1	1–0
AS Kaloum Star (Guinea)	3–3 (a)	(Nigeria) Enugu Rangers	2–0	1–3
CA Bizertin (Tunisia)	2–4	(Morocco) FAR Rabat	1–4	1–0
Power Dynamos (Zambia)	1–3	(Zimbabwe) Black Rhinos	0–2	1–1
Stade Malien (Mali)	2–3	(Algeria) GCR Mascara	2–0	0–3
US Gorée (Senegal)	3–1	(Ghana) Hearts of Oak	3–0	0–1
Vital'O (Burundi)	4–2	(Gabon) AS Sogara	3–1	1–1
Zamalek (Egypt)	5–1	(Sudan) Al-Hilal	4–0	1–1

== Quarter-finals ==
Team 1	Agg.	Team 2	1st leg	2nd leg
Black Rhinos (Zimbabwe)	2–3	(Senegal) US Gorée	2–0	0–3
FAR Rabat (Morocco)	3–3 (3–1 p)	(Guinea) AS Kaloum Star	3–0	0–3
GCR Mascara (Algeria)	0–3	(Zaire) AS Bilima	0–0	0–3
Vital'O (Burundi)	3–5	(Egypt) Zamalek	1–0	2–5

== Semi-finals ==
Team 1	Agg.	Team 2	1st leg	2nd leg
AS Bilima (Zaire)	2–1	(Senegal) US Gorée	2–0	0–1
Zamalek (Egypt)	1–1 (3–4 p)	(Morocco) FAR Rabat	1–0	0–1

== Final ==
30 November 1985
--:-- UTC+0

FAR Rabat (Morocco)	5–2	(Zaire) AS Bilima
Khairi 18'; Haidamou 27', 57'; Chicha 46'; Barbouri 75'		Goal

Prince Moulay Abdellah Stadium, Rabat
22 December 1985
--:-- UTC+2

AS Bilima (Zaire)	1–1	(Morocco) FAR Rabat
Goal		Haidamou 39'

Mobutu Stadium, Lubumbashi

== Champion ==
1985 African Cup of Champions Clubs winners
(Morocco)
FAR Rabat
First title

== Top scorers ==
The top scorers from the 1985 African Cup of Champions Clubs are as follows:

Rank	Name	Team	Goals
1	(Morocco) Abderrazak Khairi	(Morocco) FAR Rabat	4
1	(Morocco) Saad Dahane	(Morocco) FAR Rabat	4
1	(Morocco) Abdellah Haidamou	(Morocco) FAR Rabat	4
1	(Algeria) Mokhtar Chibani	(Algeria) GCR Mascara	4
5	(Angola) Jesus	(Angola) Petro Atlético	3
5	(Egypt) Gamal Abdel Hamid	(Egypt) Zamalek	3
5	(Morocco) Lahcen Chicha	(Morocco) FAR Rabat	3
5	(Morocco) Mohamed Timoumi	(Morocco) FAR Rabat	3
9	(Algeria) Mourad Belhadj	(Algeria) GCR Mascara	2
9	(Egypt) Mohamed Helmy	(Egypt) Zamalek	2
9	(Egypt) Nasr Ibrahim	(Egypt) Zamalek	4
9	(Egypt) Tarek Yehia	(Egypt) Zamalek	2
9	(Morocco) Abdelmalek El Aziz	(Morocco) FAR Rabat	2
