= Lenny Gwata =

Zimbabwean footballer

Personal information
- Date of birth: December 13, 1976
- Date of death: April 12, 2010 (aged 33)
- Position: Defender

Youth career
- Zimbabwe Saints: Highlanders F.C

Senior career*
| Years | Team | Apps | (Gls) |
| 1999–2005 | Dynamos F.C. | | |
| 2006 | Buymore F.C. | | |

International career
| 2001–2003 | Zimbabwe | 5 | (0) |
- * Club domestic league appearances and goals

Lenny Gwata (born 4 January 1974 - 12 April 2010) was a Zimbabwean football defender who passed on in 2010. He survived with a wife Beatar Mangethe who passed on 2 months later and one son.
