= Robson Chisango =

Zimbabwean footballer (born 1975)

Personal information
- Date of birth: 27 May 1975 (age 51)
- Position: Forward

Senior career*
Years	Team	Apps	(Gls)
- Black Rhinos F.C.
- Hellenic F.C.
- Black Rhinos F.C.
- BMC Lobatse

International career
2000	Zimbabwe	3	(1)
- * Club domestic league appearances and goals

Robson Chisango (born 27 May 1975) is a retired Zimbabwean football striker. A Zimbabwe international, he played at the 2000 COSAFA Cup.
