= Sam Dauya =

Sam Dauya (October 22, 1937 – May 11, 2008) was the Zimbabwean founder of the Dynamos F.C. football team, which was founded in 1963 and is based in Harare. Dauya was born to Malawian parents in Waterfalls, Zimbabwe, on October 22, 1937. He attended St Michael's School as a student. His first job following the completion of his studies was as a credit controller at Zimbabwe Furnishers, which at the time was owned by Teddy Cohen.

Dauya began thinking of starting his own soccer team in the early 1960s, after authorities in what was then known as Rhodesia started a professional football in 1962 composed exclusively of White players. Black players were not permitted to play on the Rhodesian teams. Coincidentally, two Black football teams, Salisbury City and Salisbury United, were disbanded at approximately this time. Dauya approached members of the defunct teams about starting a new football club for Black players.

Dynamos F.C. was officially founded in 1963, composed of players from Black townships surrounding Harare. Dauya personally designed the team's first logo and wrote the club's constitution.

Sam Dauya died at a private hospital in Harare, Zimbabwe, on May 11, 2008, at the age of 70. He died just one day after Dynamos F.C. defeated the current African champions, Etoile du Sahel. Mourners gathered to remember Dauya at his home at Number 6 Smit Crescent in Eastlea, Zimbabwe. He was survived by three children Terry, Caroline and Jackie. He has eight grandchildren Tim, Will, Jon, Theo, Eli, Malachai, Livia and Jonathan. His wife was the late Chipo Judith Banda.
