= 1998 CAF Champions League final =

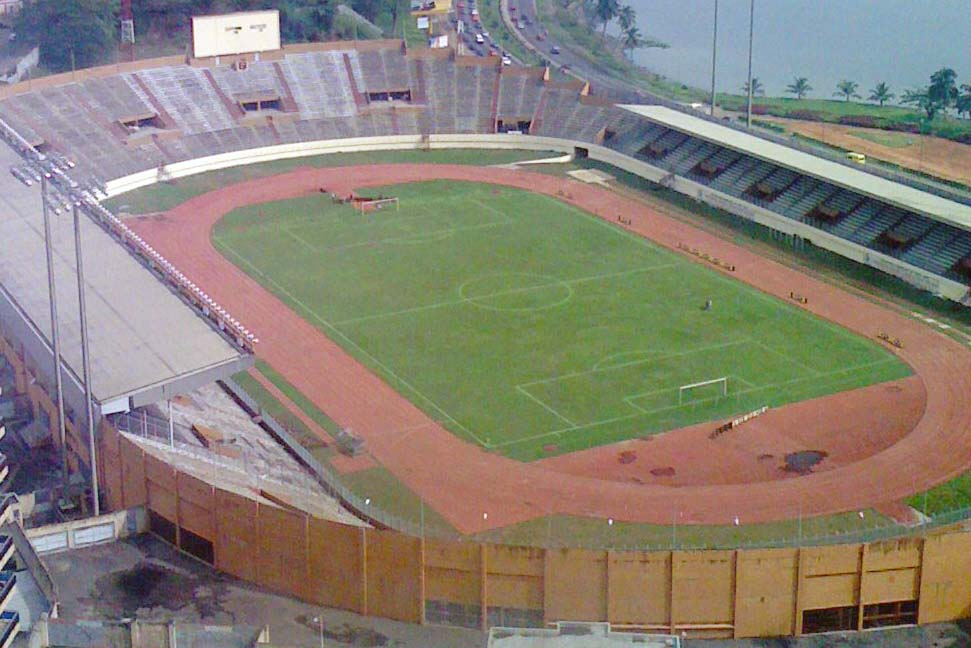
- Félix Houphouët-Boigny Stadium hosted the podium where ASEC Mimosas lifted the trophy
- Event: 1998 CAF Champions League
Dynamos Harare	ASEC Mimosas
(Zimbabwe)	(Ivory Coast)
2	4
- on aggregate

First leg
Dynamos Harare	ASEC Mimosas
0	0
- Date: 28 November 1998
- Venue: National Sports Stadium, Harare
- Referee: Karim Daho (Algeria)
- Attendance: 45 000

Second leg
ASEC Mimosas	Dynamos Harare
4	2
- Date: 12 December 1998
- Venue: Stade Félix Houphouët-Boigny, Abidjan
- Referee: Mourad Daami (Tunisia)
- Attendance: 50 000

The 1998 CAF Champions League final is the final of the 1998 CAF Champions League, the 34th edition of Africa's premier club football tournament organized by the Confederation of African Football (CAF), and the 2nd edition under the current CAF Champions League format.

The final is contested in two-legged home-and-away format between Dynamos FC of Zimbabwe and ASEC Mimosas of Côte d'Ivoire. The first leg was hosted by Dynamos FC at the National Sports Stadium in Harare on 28 November 1998, while the second leg was hosted by ASEC Mimosas at the Stade Félix Houphouët-Boigny in Abidjan on 12 December 1998. ASEC Mimosas won on aggregate and it earns the right to play in the 1999 CAF Super Cup against the winner of the 1998 African Cup Winners' Cup.

== Qualified teams ==
In the following table, finals until 1996 were in the African Cup of Champions Club era, since 1997 were in the CAF Champions League era.

Team	Region	Previous finals appearances (bold indicates winners)
(Zimbabwe) Dynamos Harare	COSAFA (Southern Africa)	none
(Ivory Coast) ASEC Mimosas	WAFU (West Africa)	1995

== Venues ==
=== Harare National Stadium ===
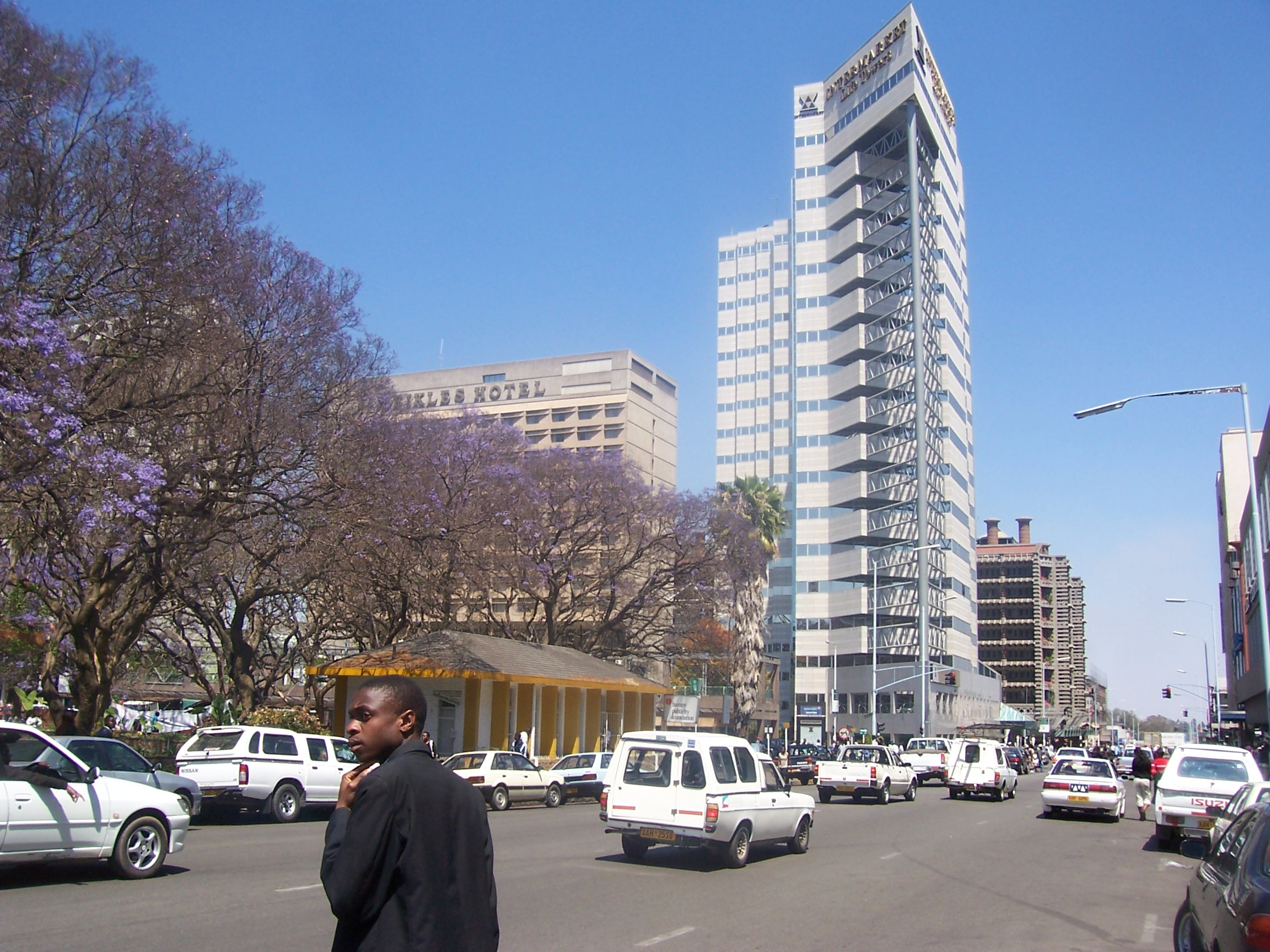
Harare, Zimbabwe hosted the first leg.

Harare National Stadium is a multi-purpose stadium, in Harare, Zimbabwe, with a maximum capacity of 60,000 people. It is the largest stadium in Zimbabwe. Located in Harare just a Few meters from Heroes Acre. It is used mostly for football matches, but is also used for rugby union. CAPS United F.C. use the venue, which opened in 1987, for most of their home games.

The stadium has hosted many important events since its construction such as the 1995 All-Africa Games.

Although it is not the stadium of Dynamos, it was used in the CAF Champions League because it is larger than Rufaro Stadium (stadium of the team) that has a capacity of 35,000 spectators.

=== Stade Félix Houphouët-Boigny ===
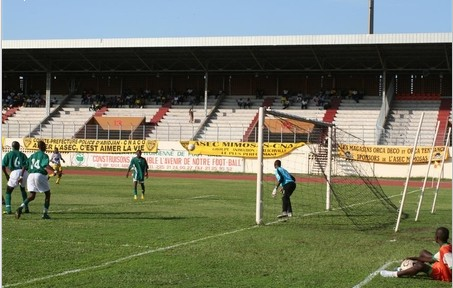
Stade Félix Houphouët-Boigny in Abidjan, Côte d'Ivoire hosted the second leg.

Félix Houphouët-Boigny Stadium, nicknamed Le Félicia, is a multi-purpose stadium, which can host football, rugby union and athletics, in Abidjan, Ivory Coast. It is the national stadium of the Ivory Coast national football team. It is named after the first president of the country, Félix Houphouët-Boigny, and is located in the commune of Le Plateau. The stadium has a capacity of 50,000. It also hosts matches of the ASEC Abidjan. It has been the site of several deadly stampedes.

== Road to final ==
(Zimbabwe) Dynamos Harare				Round	(Ivory Coast) ASEC Mimosas			
Opponent	Agg.	1st leg	2nd leg	Qualifying rounds	Opponent	Agg.	1st leg	2nd leg
(Malawi) Telecom Wanderers	4–2	2–1 (A)	2–1 (H)	First round	(Burkina Faso) RC Bobo	4–2	0–1 (A)	4–1 (H)
(Mozambique) Ferroviário Maputo	2–1	1–1 (H)	1–0 (A)	Second round	(Gabon) FC 105 Libreville	4–2	2–0 (H)	2–2 (A)
Opponent	Result			Group stage	Opponent	Result		
(Nigeria) Eagle Cement	3–0 (H)			Matchday 1	(Morocco) Raja Casablanca	1–0 (A)		
(Ghana) Hearts of Oak	1–1 (A)			Matchday 2	(Tanzania) Young Africans	2–1 (H)		
(Tunisia) Étoile du Sahel	1–0 (H)			Matchday 3	(South Africa) Manning Rangers	3–1 (H)		
(Tunisia) Étoile du Sahel	0–1 (A)			Matchday 4	(South Africa) Manning Rangers	0–1 (A)		
(Nigeria) Eagle Cement	1–0 (A)			Matchday 5	(Morocco) Raja Casablanca	1–1 (H)		
(Ghana) Hearts of Oak	0–1 (H)			Matchday 6	(Tanzania) Young Africans	3–0 (A)		
Group A Winner: Pos / Team / Pld / W / D / L / GF / GA / GD / Pts / Qualification; 1 / (Zimbabwe) Dynamos Harare / 6 / 3 / 1 / 2 / 6 / 3 / +3 / **10** / Final; 2 / (Ghana) Hearts of Oak / 6 / 3 / 1 / 2 / 7 / 6 / +1 / **10**; 3 / (Tunisia) ES Sahel / 6 / 3 / 0 / 3 / 11 / 7 / +4 / **9**; 4 / (Nigeria) Eagle Cement / 6 / 2 / 0 / 4 / 3 / 11 / −8 / **6**; Source: Rules for classification: Group stage tiebreakers				Final standings	Group B Winner: Pos / Team / Pld / W / D / L / GF / GA / GD / Pts / Qualification; 1 / (Ivory Coast) ASEC Mimosas / 6 / 4 / 1 / 1 / 10 / 4 / +6 / **13** / Final; 2 / (South Africa) Manning Rangers / 6 / 3 / 1 / 2 / 9 / 6 / +3 / **10**; 3 / (Morocco) Raja Casablanca / 6 / 2 / 2 / 2 / 12 / 7 / +5 / **8**; 4 / (Tanzania) Young Africans / 6 / 0 / 2 / 4 / 5 / 19 / −14 / **2**; Source: Rules for classification: Group stage tiebreakers			

== Format ==
The final was decided over two legs, with aggregate goals used to determine the winner. If the sides were level on aggregate after the second leg, the away goals rule would have been applied, and if still level, the tie would have proceeded directly to a penalty shootout (no extra time is played).

== Matches ==
=== First leg ===
28 November 1998
--:-- UTC+2

Dynamos Harare (Zimbabwe)	0–0	(Ivory Coast) ASEC Mimosas

National Sports Stadium, Harare
Attendance: 45,000
Referee: Karim Daho (Algeria)

=== Second leg ===
12 December 1998
--:-- UTC+0

ASEC Mimosas (Ivory Coast)	4–2	(Zimbabwe) Dynamos Harare
Camara 30', 38'; Sié 43'; Zaki 52'		Phiri 60'; Owusu 81'

Stade Félix Houphouët-Boigny, Abidjan
Attendance: 50,000
Referee: Mourad Daami (Tunisia)
