= Stephen Worgu =

Nigerian footballer

Stephen Worgu (born 6 April 1990 in Brass, Nigeria) is a Nigerian footballer who plays for Bowsher Club in Oman.

== Club career ==
=== Ocean Boys (2005–2007) and Enyimba (2007) ===
In 2006, Worgu was a member of the Ocean Boys F.C. team that won the Nigerian Premier League under the tutelage of former Enyimba International F.C. manager, Maurice Cooreman. Throughout his two-year stay with the Bayelsa State club, the diminutive player enjoyed a low profile rating compared to Ideye Aide Brown, team captain Blessing Okardi and goalkeeper Ikechukwu Ezenwa, before joining Enyimba in July 2007.

Worgu spent one year with Enyimba, which turned out to be a very successful year for the rising star. He lifted Enyimba to the semi-final of the CAF Champions League 2008, their best position since their championship title in 2004. Worgu was the top scorer in the competition, accumulating 13 goals, five goals ahead of Daouda Kamilou of Cotonsport Garoua.

=== Al-Merrikh (2009–2010) ===
On 22 October 2008, Worgu agreed to a 4-year contract with the Sudanese giant, Al-Merreikh who outbid the Egyptian club Al Ahly. The deal was worth an estimated $2.5 million, with $1 million annual salary and the remaining $1.5 million to the former club. Worgu cited the favour of the Sudanese bid over others, due to the seriousness of their offer. Along with his compatriots Idahor and Osunwa, Worgu becomes the third Nigerian attacker to join the Al-Merreikh squad that competed in the African Champions' League for the first time since 2003.

At Al-Merreikh, Worgu was given the number 10 jersey, which replaced the number 27 jersey that he wore in Enyimba. With the high salary and the former Champion's league top scoring performance, the expectations were set high for the Nigerian youth star. He got to a slow start, with Al-Merreikh defending their Sudan Premier League title, and he was yet to score a goal in seven premier league and three champion's league matches. On 21 April 2009, in an interview with the BBC, Worgu uttered his struggle to adapt to his new professional destination away from home, citing language and cultural barriers. "Going onto the pitch the fans are singing your name, but I don't know what they're saying, I have to ask a friend," he said.

On 23 April 2009, in the first match following the interview, Worgu managed to score his first goal in the Sudanese league against Al-Ittihad, where Al-Merreikh won 2/0. Despite his earlier yellow card in that match, Worgu rushed towards Al-Merreikh fans to celebrate his first league goal by taking his shirt off. He was shown a second yellow booking, which warranted him also his first red card in the competition.

Later on in August, Worgu was caught drinking which is illegal in Sudan. The club paid 24 million pounds on his behalf and he punished by 40 lashes.

=== Al-Ahly Benghazi (2010–2011) ===
Striker Stephen Worgu agreed to join Libyan side, Al-Ahly Benghazi, from Sudanese giants, Al-Merreikh, for a period of eight months. The deal for Worgu's move was concluded when Al-Merreikh undersecretary, Mutwakil Ahmed Ali and a representative of Al-Ahly Benghazi of Libya met and agreed on a fee for the short-term deal. Worgu, 20, confirmed this after his last game for the Sudanese side when they secured a 3–1 win over Hay Al-Arab in which he scored a hat-trick. He is expected to earn as much as $500,000 from the deal, while Al-Merreikh will be paid the sum of $200,000.

=== Return to Sudan ===
When the conflict in Libya started, it completely disrupted the Libyan Football league and he was forced to return to his hometown. His Sudanese club El-Merriekh, took him back following the expiration of loan term.

He was a key player in helping El-Merriekh win the Sudanese League, scoring several important goals during the last part of the season. During this time he was invited to the Nigerian U-23 team for the U-23 Olympic qualifying tournament in Morocco.

== Position ==
Worgu plays in variable positions, but mainly as attacking midfielder or striker.

== Honours ==
- 2006: Eritrean Premier League Winner
- 2008: CAF Champions League 2008 top scorer with 13 goals
