= Sébastien Ndzana Kana =

Cameroonian footballer (born 1983)

Sébastien Kana
Personal information
- Full name: Sébastien Ndjana Kana
- Date of birth: 18 November 1983 (age 42)
- Place of birth: Yaoundé, Cameroon
- Height: 1.75 m (5 ft 9 in)
- Position: Defender

Team information
- Current team: Union Douala
- Number: 21

Senior career*
Years	Team	Apps	(Gls)
–2000	Mount Cameroon		
2000–2002	Canon Yaoundé		
2002–2013	Cotonsport Garoua		
2013–?	Union Douala		
- * Club domestic league appearances and goals as of 22 December 2007

Sébastien Ndjana Kana (born 18 November 1983) is a professional Cameroonian footballer who last played as a defender for Union Douala.

== Career ==
Kana Ndzana was born in Yaoundé, Cameroon. After beginning his footballing career with Jeunesse Star Yaoundé, Mount Cameroon F.C. and Canon Yaoundé, he joined Coton Sport FC de Garoua in 2002. He was a key figure in Coton Sport's run to the 2008 CAF Champions League Final, scoring a goal in the club's semi-final win over Dynamos F.C. He also captained the side to a domestic league and cup double in 2008.

Kana Ndzana represented Cameroon at youth level, and was selected for the senior national team twice (without making a competitive appearance). He did play for the local national team, winning two editions of the CEMAC Cup.

After he retired from playing, Kana Ndzana became a football coach. He managed Sporting FC through a promotion to Cameroon's regionalized third level of club football in 2019.
