= Marcellin Gaha Djiadeu =

Cameroonian footballer

Marcellin Djiadeu
Personal information
- Full name: Marcellin Gaha Djiadeu
- Date of birth: March 24, 1982 (age 44)
- Place of birth: Bafang, Cameroon
- Height: 1.88 m (6 ft 2 in)
- Position: Defender

Senior career*
Years	Team	Apps	(Gls)
1998–2003	Unisport de Bafang		
2003–2008	Cotonsport Garoua		
2009	Arema FC		
2010–2012	Unisport de Bafang		

Managerial career
- 2013–: Unisport de Bafang
- * Club domestic league appearances and goals

Marcellin Gaha Djiadeu (born March 24, 1982, in Bafang) is a professional Cameroonian professional football coach and former player.

== Career ==
He began his career at FC Unisport de Bafang and signed in January 2003 with Cotonsport Garoua. Djiadeu left in December 2008 to Cotonsport FC de Garoua and signed in Indonesia for Arema FC. He returned in the Spring of 2010 to Cameroon and became the captain of Unisport de Bafang.

== Coaching career ==
In April 2013 he attained the B Coaching Licence and started as player-head coach of Unisport de Bafang.
