= 2003 CAF Cup =

Tournament details
- Dates: 11 April 2003 – 23 November 2003
- Teams: 30

Final positions
- Champions: (Morocco) Raja Casablanca (1st title)
- Runners-up: (Cameroon) Cotonsport Garoua

Tournament statistics
- Matches played: 56
- Goals scored: 126 (2.25 per match)

The 2003 CAF Cup was the 12th and final edition of the African continental club competition for runners up of the respective domestic leagues. It was won by Moroccan team Raja Casablanca who beat Cotonsport Garoua from Cameroon over two legs in the final.

In following seasons, the CAF Cup was merged with the African Cup Winners' Cup to form the CAF Confederation Cup.

== First round ==
Team 1	Agg.	Team 2	1st leg	2nd leg
St Michel United (Seychelles)	1–0	(Madagascar) DSA	0–0	1–0
Green Buffaloes (Zambia)	3–2	(Uganda) Express FC	2–1	1–1
Maxaquene (Mozambique)	1–1(a)	(Zimbabwe) Black Rhinos	1–1	0–0
Khartoum-3 (Sudan)	1–3	(Rwanda) Kiyovu Sport	1–1	0–2
Ethiopian Bunna (Ethiopia)	0–1	(Libya) Al-Nasr	0–0	0–1
AS Kaloum Star (Guinea)	0–0(p)	(Senegal) SONACOS	0–0	0–0
Étoile Filante (Burkina Faso)	2–7	(Morocco) Raja Casablanca	2–3	0–4
FC 105 (Gabon)	4–3	(Mali) Djoliba AC	3–0	1–3
Requins de l'Atlantique (Benin)	1–2	(Tunisia) Club Africain	1–0	0–2
CS La Mancha (Republic of the Congo)	1–2	(Ivory Coast) Jeunesse Club d'Abidjan	0–1	1–1
Cotonsport Garoua (Cameroon)	(p)0-0	(Togo) Maranatha F.C.	0–0	0–0
Primeiro de Agosto (Angola)	2–2(p)	(South Africa) Mamelodi Sundowns	2–0	0–2
DC Motema Pembe (Democratic Republic of the Congo)	7–1	(Equatorial Guinea) Renacimiento FC	4–1	3–0
Enugu Rangers (Nigeria)	w/o^{1}	(Liberia) LSCR FC		
Al-Ahly (Egypt)	bye			
JS Kabylie (Algeria)	bye			

^{1}LISCR withdrew before the first leg and were subsequently banned for 3 years by CAF.

=== First leg ===
2003-04-12

St Michel United FC (Seychelles)	0–0	(Madagascar) DSA

2003-04-13

Green Buffaloes (Zambia)	2–1	(Uganda) Express FC
Fichite 74'; Mwandila 79'		Okello 64'

2003-04-11

Maxaquene (Mozambique)	1–1	(Zimbabwe) Black Rhinos
Chavanne 88'		Phiri 38'

2003-04-12

Khartoum-3 (Sudan)	1–1	(Rwanda) Kiyovu Sport
Ibrahim 87'		Levis 62'

2003-04-13

Ethiopian Bunna (Ethiopia)	0–0	(Libya) Al-Nasr

2003-04-13

AS Kaloum Star (Guinea)	0–0	(Senegal) SONACOS

2003-04-13

Étoile Filante (Burkina Faso)	2–3	(Morocco) Raja Casablanca
Baga 51'; Kaboré 62'		Bidoudane 20', 22'; Koné 78'

2003-04-12

FC 105 Libreville (Gabon)	3–0	(Mali) Djoliba AC
Kota 51'; Kossi 72'; Nguema 89'

2003-04-13

Requins de l'Atlantique (Benin)	1–0	(Tunisia) Club Africain
Maiga 70'

2003-04-13

CS La Mancha (Republic of the Congo)	0–1	(Ivory Coast) Jeunesse Club d'Abidjan
		Dadie 9'

2003-04-13

Cotonsport Garoua (Cameroon)	0–0	(Togo) Maranatha FC

2003-04-13

Primeiro de Agosto (Angola)	2–0	(South Africa) Mamelodi Sundowns
Filipe 81' (pen.); Lucas 90'

2003-04-12

DC Motema Pembe (Democratic Republic of the Congo)	4–1	(Equatorial Guinea) Renacimiento FC
Biku 21'; Bolozi 40', 46'; Muziele 43'		Nka 48'

=== Second leg ===
2003-04-27

DSA (Madagascar)	0–1	(Seychelles) St Michel United FC
		Nibourette 84'

Saint Michel United win 1–0 on aggregate

2003-04-25

Express FC (Uganda)	1–1	(Zambia) Green Buffaloes
Mwandila 35'		Mubiru 9'

Green Buffaloes win 3–2 on aggregate

2003-04-27

Black Rhinos (Zimbabwe)	0–0	(Mozambique) Maxaquene

1–1 on aggregate, Black Rhinos win on away goals

2003-04-25

Kiyovu Sport (Rwanda)	2–0	(Sudan) Khartoum-3
Mugosha 12'; Masudi 40'

Kiyovu Sport win 3–1 on aggregate

2003-04-25

Al-Nasr (Libya)	1–0	(Ethiopia) Ethiopian Bunna
El Masli 46'

Al-Nasr win 1–0 on aggregate

2003-04-26

SONACOS (Senegal)	0 – 0 5 – 4 (p)	(Guinea) AS Kaloum Star

0–0 on aggregate, SONACOS win 5–4 on penalties

2003-04-26

Raja Casablanca (Morocco)	4–0	(Burkina Faso) Étoile Filante
Aboucherouane 40', 49'; Bidoudane 68'; Endene 77'

Raja Casablanca win 7–2 on aggregate

2003-04-26

Djoliba AC (Mali)	3–1	(Gabon) FC 105 Libreville
Malal 3'; Tounkara 79'; Sylla 82'		Ive N. 89'

FC 105 Libreville win 4–3 on aggregate

2003-04-26

Club Africain (Tunisia)	2–0	(Benin) Requins de l'Atlantique
Ben Khaled 1'; Rhouma 32'

Club Africain win 2–1 on aggregate

2003-04-27

Jeunesse Club d'Abidjan (Ivory Coast)	1–1	(Republic of the Congo) CS La Mancha
Mavoungou 45'		Gnize 54'

Jeunesse Club d'Abidjan win 2–1 on aggregate

2003-04-25

Maranatha FC (Togo)	0 – 0 2 – 4 (p)	(Cameroon) Cotonsport Garoua

0–0 on aggregate, Cotonsport Garoua win 4–2 on penalties

2003-04-25

Mamelodi Sundowns (South Africa)	2 – 0 9 – 8 (p)	(Angola) Primeiro de Agosto
dos Santos 5'; Marumo

2–2 on aggregate, Mamelodi Sundowns win 9–8 on penalties

2003-04-12

Renacimiento FC (Equatorial Guinea)	0–3	(Democratic Republic of the Congo) DC Motema Pembe
Biku 21'		Muziele 27'; Embo 37'; Bokese 79'

DC Motema Pembe win 7–1 on aggregate

== Second round ==
Team 1	Agg.	Team 2	1st leg	2nd leg
Green Buffaloes (Zambia)	7–1	(Seychelles) St Michel United	5–0	2–1
Kiyovu Sport (Rwanda)	1–2	(Zimbabwe) Black Rhinos	1–0	0–2
SONACOS (Senegal)	1–1(a)	(Algeria) JS Kabylie	1–1	0–0
Al-Nasr (Libya)	1–4	(Egypt) Al-Ahly	1–2	0–2
FC 105 (Gabon)	3–7	(Morocco) Raja Casablanca	2–1	1–6
Jeunesse Club d'Abidjan (Ivory Coast)	2–6	(Tunisia) Club Africain	2–0	0–6
Mamelodi Sundowns (South Africa)	1–2	(Cameroon) Cotonsport Garoua	1–0	0–2
Enugu Rangers (Nigeria)	2–1	(Democratic Republic of the Congo) DC Motema Pembe	2–0	0–1

=== First leg ===
2003-05-17

Green Buffaloes (Zambia)	5–0	(Seychelles) St Michel United FC
Katongo 27', 37', 62', 68'; Changa Chaiwa 41'

2003-05-17

Kiyovu Sport (Rwanda)	1–0	(Zimbabwe) Black Rhinos
Mugisha 55'

2003-05-17

SONACOS (Senegal)	1–1	(Algeria) JS Kabylie
Zafour 76' (o.g.)		Berguiga 17'

2003-05-16

Al-Nasr (Libya)	1–2	(Egypt) Al-Ahly
El-Mtkhtri 48'		Gilberto 31'; Ghaly 51'

2003-05-17

FC 105 Libreville (Gabon)	2–1	(Morocco) Raja Casablanca
Koto 52'; Nguema 90+1'		Aboucherouane 90+5'

2003-05-17

Jeunesse Club d'Abidjan (Ivory Coast)	2–0	(Tunisia) Club Africain
Okpo 21'; Gnize 81'

2003-05-18

Mamelodi Sundowns (South Africa)	1–0	(Cameroon) Cotonsport Garoua

2003-05-17

Enugu Rangers (Nigeria)	2–0	(Democratic Republic of the Congo) DC Motema Pembe
Okereke; Otegheri 81'

=== Second leg ===
2003-05-31

St Michel United FC (Seychelles)	1–2	(Zambia) Green Buffaloes
Zialor 5'		Ngosa 28'; Katongo 38'

Green Buffaloes win 7–1 on aggregate

2003-06-01

Black Rhinos (Zimbabwe)	2–0	(Rwanda) Kiyovu Sport
Muhone 23'; Chisango 60'

Black Rhinos win 2–1 on aggregate

2003-05-30

JS Kabylie (Algeria)	0–0	(Senegal) SONACOS

1–1 on aggregate, JS Kabylie win on away goals

2003-05-31

Al-Ahly (Egypt)	2–0	(Libya) Al-Nasr
Fadl 6'; Moustafa 71'

Al-Ahly win 4–1 on aggregate

2003-05-30

Raja Casablanca (Morocco)	6–1	(Gabon) FC 105 Libreville
Erbati 8'; Sami 16', 60'; Suliemane 47'; Aboucherouane 58'; El-Atlassi 89'		Matial 66'

Raja Casablanca win 7–3 on aggregate

2003-05-31

Club Africain (Tunisia)	6–0	(Ivory Coast) Jeunesse Club d'Abidjan
Daye 11', 67'; Mouelhi 29' (pen.); El Taib 42'; Bouzaiene 53'; Fathalli 64'

Club Africain win 6–2 on aggregate

2003-06-01

Cotonsport Garoua (Cameroon)	2–0	(South Africa) Mamelodi Sundowns
Soussia 34'; Nassourou 77'

Cotonsport Garoua win 2–1 on aggregate

2003-06-01

DC Motema Pembe (Democratic Republic of the Congo)	1–0	(Nigeria) Enugu Rangers
Monzua

Enugu Rangers win 1–0 on aggregate

== Quarter-finals ==
Team 1	Agg.	Team 2	1st leg	2nd leg
Black Rhinos (Zimbabwe)	2–6	(Morocco) Raja Casablanca	1–1	1–5
Enugu Rangers (Nigeria)	4–0	(Egypt) Al-Ahly	4–0	0–0
JS Kabylie (Algeria)	1–2	(Cameroon) Cotonsport Garoua	0–0	1–2
Club Africain (Tunisia)	5–2	(Zambia) Green Buffaloes	4–1	1–1

== Semi-finals ==
Team 1	Agg.	Team 2	1st leg	2nd leg
Raja Casablanca (Morocco)	4–3	(Nigeria) Enugu Rangers	4–1	0–2
Cotonsport Garoua (Cameroon)	4–2	(Tunisia) Club Africain	3–0	1–2

== Finals ==
=== First leg ===
November 9, 2003

Raja Casablanca (Morocco)	2–0	(Cameroon) Cotonsport Garoua
Bidoudane 11'; Diallo 72'

Casablanca

=== Second leg ===
November 23, 2003

Cotonsport Garoua (Cameroon)	0–0	(Morocco) Raja Casablanca

Garoua

Raja Casablanca win 2–0 on aggregate

== Champions ==
CAF Cup 2003

Raja Casablanca
First Title

== See also ==
- 2003 CAF Champions League
