= HTMF Mahajanga =

Malagasy football club

HTMF
- Full name: Herin Tanoro Milalao Fampianarana Mahajanga
- Ground: Rabemananjara Stadium; Mahajanga, Madagascar
- Capacity: 10,000
- League: THB Champions League

Herin Tanoro Milalao Fampianarana Mahajanga is a Malagasy football club based in Mahajanga, Madagascar.

In 1986 the team won the Coupe de Madagascar.

== Achievements ==
- Coupe de Madagascar: 1

1986

== Performance in CAF competitions ==
- African Cup of Champions Clubs: 1 appearance

1984 African Cup of Champions Clubs: First Round

== Stadium ==
Currently the team plays at the Rabemananjara Stadium.
