= Henri Pierre Armand Nnouck Minka =

Cameroonian footballer

Henri Pierre Minka
Personal information
- Full name: Henri Pierre Armand N'nouck Minka
- Date of birth: July 15, 1984 (age 42)
- Place of birth: Douala, Cameroon
- Height: 1.90 m (6 ft 3 in)
- Position: Defender

Team information
- Current team: Douala Athletic Club

Senior career*
Years	Team	Apps	(Gls)
2000–2004	Jeunesse Bonamoussadi		
2004–2010	Cotonsport Garoua		
2011–	DAC 2000		

International career
2004–2009	Cameroon	5	(0)
- * Club domestic league appearances and goals

Henri Pierre Armand Nnouck Minka (born July 15, 1984 in Douala) is a professional Cameroonian footballer who plays for Douala Athletic Club.

== Career ==
He also played previously from 2000 to 2004 with Jeunesse de Bonamoussadi and from 2004 until 2010 with Cotonsport Garoua.

=== International ===
Minka was 2004 first time nominated for the Cameroon national football team and played until 2009 in five national games. He played also for the Cameroonian national army football team and won 2007 the African Military Cup.
