= Kings Park Soccer Stadium =

Multi-use stadium in Durban, South Africa

Coordinates: 29°49′46″S 31°01′49″E

Kings Park Soccer Stadium was a multi-use stadium in Durban, South Africa that was built in 1958. It was formerly used mostly for football matches and was the home of Manning Rangers who played in the Premier Soccer League. The stadium had a capacity of 35,000 people.

The stadium was demolished in 2006 to make way for the Moses Mabhida Stadium, one of the key stadiums for the 2010 World Cup.
