= National Sports Stadium (Zimbabwe) =

Stadium in Harare, Zimbabwe

Coordinates: 17°49′16.89″S 30°59′41.05″E

- NSS
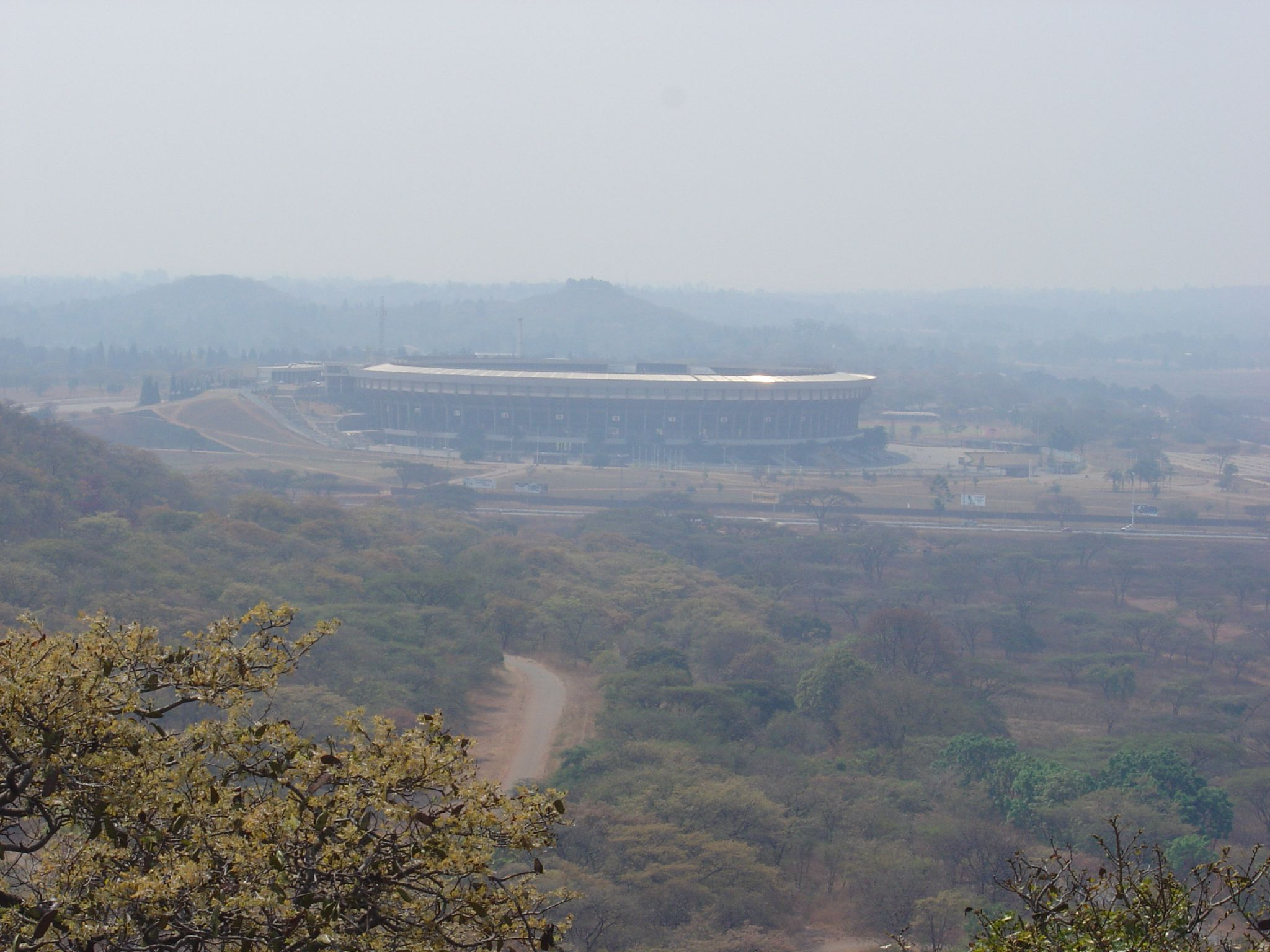
- The National Sports Stadium in 2003
- Interactive map of National Sports Stadium
- Full name: National Sports Stadium
- Location: Harare
- Capacity: 60,000
- Surface: GrassMaster
- Field size: 104 yd × 68 yd (95 m × 62 m)

Construction
- Opened: 1987
- Renovated: 2010, 2025–present

Tenant
- Zimbabwe national football team

The National Sports Stadium is a multi-purpose stadium, in Harare, Zimbabwe, with a maximum capacity of 60,000 people. It is the largest stadium in Zimbabwe, located in Harare, just a Few meters from Heroes Acre. It has been used mostly for football matches, but also for rugby union.

As of February 2026, it is being renovated.

== Overview ==
The stadium played host to Amnesty International's Human Rights Now! Benefit Concert on October 7, 1988. The show was headlined by Bruce Springsteen & The E Street Band and also featured Sting and Peter Gabriel, Tracy Chapman, Youssou N'Dour and Oliver "Tuku" Mtukudzi.

The 6th All-Africa Games were held at the National Sports Stadium in 1995.

The first leg of 1998 CAF Champions League final was held at the National Sports Stadium on 28 November 1998 between Dynamos Harare of Zimbabwe and ASEC Mimosas of Côte d'Ivoire that ended with goalless draw.

The stadium was closed for 20 months, starting November 2006, for major renovations.

On 14 September 2019, the stadium hosted Former Zimbabwean President Robert Mugabe's funeral, which was also open to public attendance, with an aerial photo showing the 60,000 capacity stadium to be about a quarter full. The funeral was attended by leaders of various African countries, including Zimbabwean President Emmerson Mnangagwa, Dr. Kenneth Kaunda of Zambia, Olusegun Obasanjo of Nigeria, Sam Nujoma, Hifikepunye Pohamba and Hage Geingob of Namibia, Joseph Kabila of DR Congo, Uhuru Kenyatta of Kenya and Cyril Ramaphosa of South Africa.

The stadium was banned from hosting international matches by the Confederation of African Football in 2020, and the stadium was closed. As of February 2026, renovations are underway.

== Major events ==
The stadium has hosted many important events since its construction such as the 1995 All-Africa Games.

== See also ==
- Lists of stadiums
