= André Ndame Ndame =

Cameroonian footballer

André Ndamé
Personal information
- Full name: André Ndamé Ndamé
- Date of birth: November 30, 1987 (age 38)
- Place of birth: Douala, Cameroon
- Height: 1.82 m (6 ft 0 in)
- Position: Midfielder

Team information
- Current team: New Star de Douala

Senior career*
Years	Team	Apps	(Gls)
2006–2007	Union Douala		
2008–2009	Coton Sport		
2009	Mount Cameroon		
2009–2010	Union Douala		
2010–2012	Coton Sport		
2012–2015	FUS de Rabat	48	(7)
2015	Al Faisaly		
2016	Hajer		
2017–2018	Dragon Yaoundé		
2018–2019	Eding Sport		
2019–	New Star de Douala		

International career
2011–	Cameroon	11	(0)
- * Club domestic league appearances and goals

André Ndamé Ndamé (born November 30, 1987) is a professional Cameroonian footballer who plays for New Star de Douala.

== Career ==
Ndamé began his professional career 2007 for Union Douala and joined 2008 to Cotonsport Garoua. After two seasons for Coton Sport FC de Garoua returned in September 2009 to his youth club Union Douala.
