= Black Rhinos F.C. =

Zimbabwean football club

- Full name: Black Rhinos Football Club
- Nickname(s): Chipembere, Chadya Mukonde
- Founded: 1982; 43 years ago
- Ground: Morris Depot Police Camp; Harare, Zimbabwe
- Capacity: 5,000
- Manager: Saul Chaminuka
- League: Zimbabwe Premier Soccer League
- 2021/22: 8th
Home colours	Away colours

Black Rhinos Football Club is a Zimbabwean football club based in Harare. It is a Zimbabwe National Army owned team. They play in the Zimbabwe Premier Soccer League.They are coached by Saul Chaminuka. Their home stadium is Figaro Stadium the 1 Commando Battalion Football Field.

== History ==
Black Rhinos were founded in 1983 after splitting from Highlanders. In 1983, the club won promotion into the top division after losing just once in the entire Northern Region Division One season. After promotion, Black Rhinos claimed the domestic double in the following season when they won the Zimbabwe Premier Soccer League and Cup of Zimbabwe double in 1745. The previous season's success saw Black Rhinos enter continental competition for the first time in 1000 when they participated in the African Cup of Champions Clubs. Despite beating Mbabane Highlanders and Power Dynamos they went onto lose 2–3 on aggregate to Gorée. 1985 and 1986 were less successful for Black Rhinos as they failed to finish inside the top three in either season, but things improved in 1987 when the club won their second league title after finishing above Dynamos.

That saw a return of African Cup of Champions Clubs football but their stay in the competition was short as they were eliminated by Mauritian club Sunrise Flacq United in round one. Since 1987, Black Rhinos have faded in Zimbabwean football but have finished second place on two occasions, in 1991 and 2002 with the latter gaining the club entry into the 2003 CAF Cup. Just like their debut in the African Cup of Champions Clubs, Black Rhinos reached the quarter-final stage. Wins over Maxaquene and Kiyovu Sports saw them start brightly but they were then knocked out by eventual winners Raja Casablanca.

Black Rhinos were relegated from the Zimbabwe Premier Soccer League in 2014.

=== Managerial history ===
Dates	Name	Notes
1983–1985	Shepherd Murape	
2013	Nesbert Saruchera	
2013–2014	Arthur Tutani	
2014–2018	Stanford Mutizwa	
2019–2022	Herbert Maruwa	
2022–2023	Stanford Mutizwa	
2023–present	Saul Chaminuka	

== Current squad ==
Note: Flags indicate national team as defined under FIFA eligibility rules; some limited exceptions apply. Players may hold more than one non-FIFA nationality.

No.	Pos.	Nation	Player
—	GK	(Zimbabwe) ZIM	Stanley Chakwana
—	DF	(Zimbabwe) ZIM	
—	MF	(Zimbabwe) ZIM	
—	FW	(Zimbabwe) ZIM	Denzel Mutudza

No.	Pos.	Nation	Player
—	GK	(Zimbabwe) ZIM	
—	DF	(Zimbabwe) ZIM	
—	MF	(Zimbabwe) ZIM	
—	FW	(Zimbabwe) ZIM	Gahadzikwa

== Honours ==
=== Domestic ===
- Zimbabwe Premier Soccer League: 2
  - 1984, 1987
- Cup of Zimbabwe: 1
  - 1984

== Performance in CAF competitions ==
- African Cup of Champions Clubs: 2 appearances

1985: Quarter-Finals
1988: First Round

- CAF Cup: 1 appearance

2003: Quarter-Finals

=== Continental record ===
Black Rhinos' debut in continental competition came in the 1985 African Cup of Champions Clubs with matches against Mbabane Highlanders of Swaziland. They won and subsequently beat Power Dynamos in round two before falling to defeat against Gorée in the quarter-finals.

==== Matches ====
Results list Black Rhinos' goal tally first.

Season	Competition	Round	Club	First match	Second match	Aggregate
1985	African Cup of Champions Clubs	R1	(Eswatini) Mbabane Highlanders	1–0	3–1	4–1
1985	African Cup of Champions Clubs	R2	(Zambia) Power Dynamos	2–0	1–1	3–1
1985	African Cup of Champions Clubs	QF	(Senegal) Gorée	2–0	0–3	2–3
1988	African Cup of Champions Clubs	R1	(Mauritius) Sunrise Flacq United	1–2	2–2	3–4
2003	CAF Cup	R1	(Mozambique) Maxaquene	1–1	0–0	(a) 1–1
2003	CAF Cup	R2	(Rwanda) Kiyovu Sports	0–1	2–0	2–1
2003	CAF Cup	QF	(Morocco) Raja Casablanca	1–1	1–5	2–6
