= Ezenwa Otorogu =

Nigerian footballer

Eze Otorogu
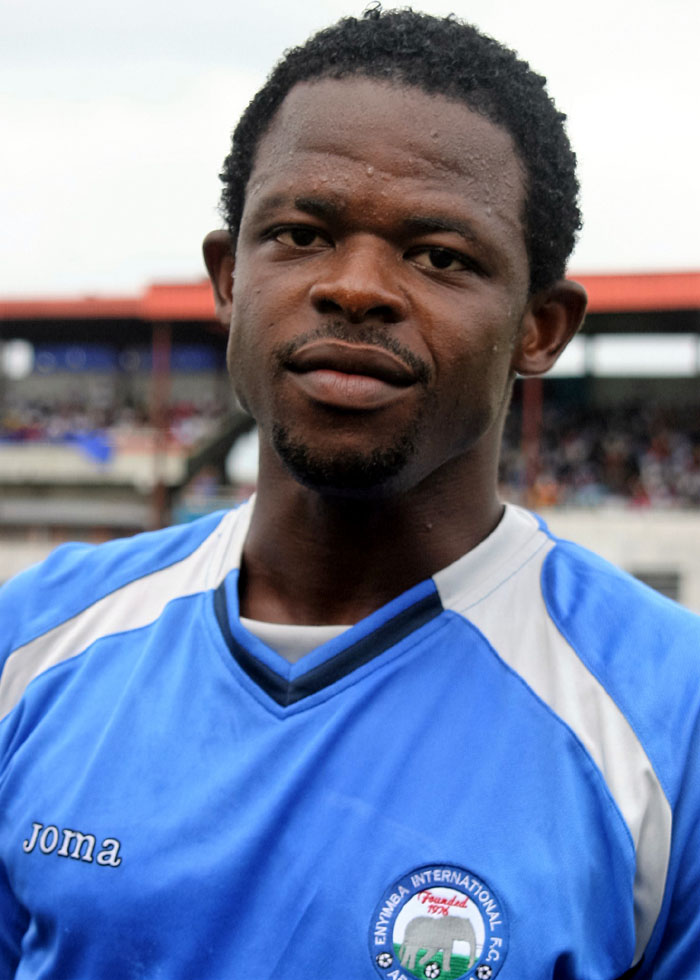
- Ezenwa Otorogu in 2010

Personal information
- Full name: Ezenwa Otorogu
- Date of birth: 13 May 1987 (age 39)
- Place of birth: Owerri, Nigeria
- Height: 1.91 m (6 ft 3 in)
- Position: Striker

Team information
- Current team: Hapoel Ashkelon
- Number: 27

Senior career*
Years	Team	Apps	(Gls)
2002–2005	El-Kanemi Warriors	?	(?)
2006–2008	Enyimba	27	(20)
2009–2010	Club Africain	8	(1)
2010–2011	Orlando Pirates	9	(2)
2011–2012	Bloemfontein Celtic	7	(0)
2013–2014	Hakoah Amidar Ramat Gan	29	(13)
2014–	Hapoel Ashkelon	13	(1)

International career
2006	Nigeria (beach soccer team)	3	(0)
- * Club domestic league appearances and goals

Ezenwa Otorogu // (born 13 May 1987, in Owerri) is a Nigerian footballer who plays for Hapoel Ashkelon in the Israeli second division.

== Club career ==
Tall striker who has been among Enyimba’s goal scorers this season 2008 with 15 goals in the league and 5 in the CAF Champions League.

He was courted by South African giants Ajax Cape Town, Denmark's Aalborg and Sudan club Al-Hilal (Omdurman), although the fee between the clubs has not been confirmed. He instead moved on 30 December 2008 to Club Africain, signing a contract until June 2011.

== International career ==
He played with Nigeria at the 2006 FIFA Beach Soccer World Cup in Brazil, he played 3 games.

== Honours ==
- Nigerian Premier League (1):
  - 2007
- MTN 8 (1):
  - 2010
- Premier Soccer League (1):
  - 2010-11
- 2008: Nigerian Premier League Top scorer with 15 goals
