= Lesotho Paramilitary Forces =

Association football club in Lesotho

LPF Maseru
- Full name: Lesotho Paramilitary Forces
- Ground: Ratjomose Stadium, Maseru, Lesotho
- Capacity: 1,000
- League: Lesotho Premier League

Lesotho Paramilitary Forces is a Lesotho football club based in Maseru. It is based in the city of Maseru in the Maseru District.

== Honours ==
The team has won the Lesotho Premier League twice; in 1983 and 1984.

== Stadium ==
The team plays at the 1000 capacity Ratjomose Stadium.
