= Karim Lancina =

Nigerien footballer

Personal information
- Full name: Lassina Abdoul Karim Konaté
- Date of birth: 20 May 1987 (age 39)
- Place of birth: Niamey, Niger
- Height: 1.84 m (6 ft 0 in)
- Positions: Midfielder; left back

Youth career
- 1999–2003: Sahel SC

Senior career*
Years	Team	Apps	(Gls)
2003–2005	Cotonsport Garoua		
2005–2007	Sahel SC		
2007–2009	Cotonsport Garoua		
2009–2010	Al-Ittihad		
2010–2013	Cotonsport Garoua		
2013	Lokomotiv Sofia		
2013–2014	Metz	3	(0)
2014–2015	SAS Épinal	28	(1)
2015–2016	ES Thaon	15	(2)
2017–2018	AS Pagny-sur-Moselle	18	(0)
2019–	US Acli		

International career
2006–2016	Niger	50	(1)
- * Club domestic league appearances and goals

Lassina Abdoul Karim Konaté (born 20 May 1987), known as Karim Lancina, is a Nigerien former professional footballer. He played either as a midfielder or as a left back.

== Club career ==
On 29 March 2013, Lancina left Cotonsport Garoua from Cameroon and signed for Bulgaria A Grupa side PFC Lokomotiv Sofia.

In August 2013, he joined French Ligue 2 team FC Metz.

== International career ==
Lancina was also a member of Niger national team amassing 50 appearances and one goal. He was called up to the 2012 and 2012 Africa Cup of Nations.

=== International goals ===
Score and result list Niger's goal tally first, score column indicates score after Lancina goal.

International goal scored by Karim Lancina
No.	Date	Venue	Opponent	Score	Result	Competition
1	9 October 2012	Stade Général-Seyni-Kountché, Niamey, Niger	Liberia	3–3	4–3	Friendly
