= Roumdé Adjia Stadium =

Sports venue in Garoua, Cameroon

- Two fans outside the stadium
- Interactive map of Roumdé Adjia Stadium
- Location: Garoua, Cameroon
- Coordinates: 9°19′34″N 13°23′57″E
- Capacity: 30,000
- Surface: Grass
- Record attendance: 18,000
- Field size: 68×105m

Construction
- Opened: 1978
- Renovated: December 2018 (expected)
- Main contractor: Mota-Engil

Tenants
- Coton Sport FC de Garoua (1986–present); Cameroon national football team (selected matches)

Roumdé Adjia Stadium (French: Stade Roumdé Adjia) is a multi-purpose stadium in Garoua, Cameroon. It is currently used mostly for football matches. It serves as the home ground of Coton Sport. The stadium holds 30,000 people and was built in 1978. This stadium was one of the stadiums used in the African Cup of Nations in 2021. It was renovated by Portuguese group Mota-Engil.
