= Ousmaïla Baba =

Cameroonian footballer

Baba Ousmaïla
Personal information
- Date of birth: 26 September 1986 (age 40)
- Place of birth: Garoua, Cameroon
- Height: 1.70 m (5 ft 7 in)
- Position: Midfielder

Team information
- Current team: Cotonsport Garoua
- Number: 20

Senior career*
Years	Team	Apps	(Gls)
2005–2008	Cotonsport Garoua	22	(12)
2008–2010	Club Sportif Sfaxien	6	(3)
2009	→ EGS Gafsa (loan)	20	(7)
2010–	Cotonsport Garoua		
- * Club domestic league appearances and goals

Baba Ousmaïla (born 26 September 1986 in Garoua) is a professional Cameroonian footballer currently playing for Cotonsport Garoua.

== Career ==
Ousmaïla played previously for ESG Gafsa on loan from Club Sportif Sfaxien.
