= Kamilou Daouda =

Nigerien footballer

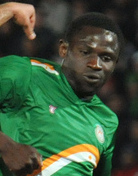
- Daouda playing for Niger in 2011

Personal information
- Full name: Daouda Kamilou
- Date of birth: 29 December 1987 (age 38)
- Place of birth: Agadez, Niger
- Height: 1.70 m (5 ft 7 in)
- Position: Striker

Team information
- Current team: Coton Sport

Senior career*
Years	Team	Apps	(Gls)
2004–2007	Akokana		
2007–2008	Cotonsport		
2008–2011	Al-Ittihad Tripoli		
2011–2012	CS Sfaxien	1	(0)
2013	JS Saoura	3	(1)
2013–2014	Coton Sport		
2015	Al Khartoum SC		
2016–	Coton Sport		

International career^{‡}
2007–2019	Niger	37	(10)
- * Club domestic league appearances and goals as of 16 ‡ National team caps and goals as of 13 October 2021

Kamilou Daouda (born 29 December 1987) is a Nigerien professional footballer who plays as a striker for Elite One club Coton Sport.

== Club career ==
His first steps were in Akokana F.C., an amateur club in Niger. He had two very good years before making a move to Coton Sport de Garoua, a top tier team in Cameroon's Elite One.

== International career ==
Daouda was a member of Niger national football team, having been called up to the 2012 Africa Cup of Nations.

=== International goals ===
Scores and results list Niger's goal tally first.

List of international goals scored by Kamilou Daouda
No.	Date	Venue	Opponent	Score	Result	Competition
1	25 March 2007	Setsoto Stadium, Maseru, Lesotho	Lesotho	1–3	1–3	2008 Africa Cup of Nations qualification
2	17 June 2007	Stade Général-Seyni-Kountché, Niamey, Niger	Nigeria	1–1	1–3	2008 Africa Cup of Nations qualification
3	7 September 2008	Stade Général-Seyni-Kountché, Niamey, Niger	Uganda	3–1	3–1	2010 FIFA World Cup qualification
4	27 March 2011	Stade Général-Seyni-Kountché, Niamey, Niger	Sierra Leone	3–1	3–1	2012 Africa Cup of Nations qualification
5	10 August 2011	Stade Général-Seyni-Kountché, Niamey, Niger	Togo	3–3	3–3	Friendly
6	9 October 2012	Stade Général-Seyni-Kountché, Niamey, Niger	Liberia	2–1	4–3	Friendly
7	9 October 2012	Stade Général-Seyni-Kountché, Niamey, Niger	Liberia	4–3	4–3	Friendly
8	7 September 2013	Stade Général-Seyni-Kountché, Niamey, Niger	Congo	2–1	2–2	2014 FIFA World Cup qualification
9	5 March 2014	Stade Olympique, Nouakchott, Mauritania	Mauritania	1–1	1–1	Friendly
10	2 September 2014	Stade Général-Seyni-Kountché, Niamey, Niger	Uganda	1–0	2–0	Friendly

== Honors ==
Coton Sport

- Elite One top scorer: 2009, 2017
