= Dynamos F.C. =

Zimbabwe football club

Dynamos Harare
- Full name: Dynamos Football Club
- Nicknames: DeMbare, The Glamour Boys
- Founded: 1963; 63 years ago
- Ground: Rufaro Stadium; Harare, Zimbabwe
- Capacity: 60,000
- Coach: Takesure Chinyama
- League: Zimbabwe Premier Soccer League
- 2025: 13th of 18
Home colours	Away colours

Dynamos F.C. (also referred to as both The Glamour Boys, and De-Mbare) is a Zimbabwean professional football club based since 1963 at Rufaro Stadium, Mbare, Harare. The team currently participates in Zimbabwe's top-tier, the Premier Soccer League. Founded in 1963 after a merger between two lesser teams in Mbare, Harare Township, Rhodesia, Dynamos quickly became one of the strongest sides in the Rhodesian league, and by the attainment of the independence of Zimbabwe in 1980 had become the country's most successful football team, having won six national championships. Dynamos have since won 22 league championships – a national record – and at least 16 trophy/cup honours.

In 1998, Dynamos contested the final of the CAF African Champions League against Ivorian side ASEC MIMOSAS, and lost the two-legged match under highly controversial circumstances.

== History ==
Dynamos Football Club was founded in 1963. The team's founder, Sam Dauya, was inspired to form a club for local black players in Salisbury (now Harare) by the establishment of an exclusively white club the previous year and the recent disbanding of two local black teams, Salisbury City and Salisbury United. To this end, Dauya prepared an emblem and wrote a club constitution. Former City and United players were then organised by Dauya into Dynamos, a combined team that, during its first year in existence, won the national championship ahead of white-dominated Salisbury Callies. Dynamos became the first black team to consistently challenge the predominantly white Rhodesia National Football League, winning successive championships in 1965 and 1966. A key player of the original Dynamos team was Patrick Dzvene, who became the first black Rhodesian to play outside his homeland in 1964 when he joined Zambian club Ndola United. Known as "Amato the Devil" or the "midfield magician", he was subsequently targeted by two English clubs, Arsenal and Aston Villa; however, Ndola refused to sell him.

The original first team poses with the Austin Cup in 1963

Dynamos acquired their nickname, the Glamour Boys, through their early style of playing: Dynamos played "carpet soccer" – football based around passes along the ground – and based their game around "entertainment and winning, attacking football". The club won three more domestic titles before the replacement of the Rhodesia National Football League with the Zimbabwe Premier Soccer League in 1980, and, during that year, became the first champions of Zimbabwe. Because of the recognition of Zimbabwe's independence following the end of Rhodesia (latterly Zimbabwe Rhodesia), Zimbabwean clubs were, from 1981, allowed to contest continental competitions for the first time. As Zimbabwean champions, the side therefore entered the African Cup of Champions Clubs for the first time in 1981. Dynamos won their first match in the Cup of Champions Clubs 5–0, and, as of 2010, have never lost a first-round match in continental competition. The team reached the quarter-finals during their first season in the tournament, an achievement that was matched twice more during the 1980s – in 1984 and 1987. Meanwhile, the team dominated the Zimbabwean league, winning six out of the first seven editions of the Zimbabwe Premier Soccer League, including the first four. Dynamos also clinched the Cup of Zimbabwe in 1985, 1986 and 1989 as well as the 1983 Zimbabwean Independence Trophy.

The team claimed four more Zimbabwean titles during the 1990s, as well as a further Cup of Zimbabwe and three more Independence Trophies. Following the 1997 league win – the club's 17th overall – Dynamos embarked on a run in the 1998 CAF Champions League that was ended only in the final by a 4–2 aggregate defeat by ASEC Mimosas, champions of the Côte d'Ivoire. After a barren start to the 2000s during which the side did not win a single title or Cup of Zimbabwe, Dynamos won their sixth Double in 2007, and, as a result of winning the Zimbabwean title, qualified once more for the Champions League. Despite defeating ASEC earlier in the tournament, Dynamos were overcome by Coton Sport of Cameroon in the semi-finals. This was the team's best Champions League run in their history. Much of this success was achieved when the much admired Patson Moyo was the chairman of the football club.

== Identity ==
Dynamos are known primarily by their nicknames: DeMbare, Chazunguza, 7 million or the Glamour Boys. DeMbare refers to the club's location and origins. Some sources have linked this to Charles Mabika while the Glamour Boys label has its roots in the elaborate and entertaining "carpet soccer" style of play exhibited by the team during its early years.

The club's colours are blue and white.

== Stadium ==
Dynamos FC have no Stadium of their own. The club relies on rented City Harare Council stadiums.

== Honours and achievements ==
As of 18 July 2016

=== Domestic honours ===
==== Pre-independence (pre–1980) ====
Honour		Title	Year(s)
Rhodesia National Football League	Champions	5	1963, 1965, 1970, 1976, 1978
Cup of Rhodesia	Winners	1	1976

==== Post-independence (post–1980) ====
Honour		Titles	Year(s)
Zimbabwe Premier Soccer League	Champions	16	1980, 1981, 1982, 1983, 1985, 1986, 1989, 1991, 1994, 1995, 1997, 2007, 2011, 2012, 2013, 2014
Zimbabwe Premier Soccer League	Runners-up	8	1987, 1988, 1996, 1999, 2008, 2009, 2010, 2015
Cup of Zimbabwe / Mbada Diamonds Cup	Winners	10	1985, 1988, 1989, 1996, 2007, 2011, 2012, 2023, 2024, 2025
Zimbabwean Independence Trophy	Winners	10	1983, 1990, 1995, 1998, 2004, 2010, 2013, 2017, 2021, 2024
Zimbabwean Charity Shield	Winners	5	2002, 2008, 2010, 2011, 2012

== Performance in continental competitions ==
- African Cup of Champions Clubs/CAF Champions League: 17 appearances

1981 – Quarter-final
1982 – Second round
1983 – Second round
1984 – Quarter-final
1986 – Second round
1987 – Quarter-final
1990 – Second round
1995 – Quarter-final
1996 – Second round
1998 – Runner-up
1999 – Group stage (Top 8)
2008 – Semi-finalist
2010 – Group stage (Top 8)
2011 – First round
2012 – Second round
2013 – First round
2014 – First round

- CAF Confederation Cup: 2 appearances

2004 – Round of 32
2012 – Play-off round

- African Cup Winners' Cup: 3 appearances

1989 – First round
1991 – Quarter-final
1997 – Second round

=== Continental record ===
Rhodesian clubs were barred from African continental competitions as the Rhodesia Football Association was not a member of the CAF. The newly renamed Zimbabwe Football Association was admitted to the CAF following Zimbabwe's independence in 1980, allowing its member clubs to enter continental competitions starting from the 1981 season.

Following Zimbabwe's independence, Dynamos began to compete in the African Cup of Champions Clubs in 1981 as Zimbabwean champions. Dynamos reached the quarter-finals at the first attempt. This was matched in 1984 and 1987, then topped in 1998; Dynamos reached the final before losing 4–2 on aggregate to Ivorian champions ASEC Mimosas. Dynamos reached the CAF Champions League semi-finals in 2008, but despite defeating ASEC earlier in the tournament, were overcome by Coton Sport of Cameroon.

Continental football started for Dynamos in the 1981 African Cup of Champions Clubs where they reached the quarter-final stage. They beat Linare and Shooting Stars before being eliminated by JE Tizi-Ouzou. Dynamos did not participate in the 2015 CAF Champions League due to a lack of sponsorship.

=== Controversy ===
Dynamos FC have long been accused of benefiting from biased officiating. Their biggest rivals Highlanders FC have constantly complained about tribalism in the administration and officiating of local games.

==== Matches ====
Results list Dynamos' goal tally first.

Season	Competition	Round	Club	First match	Second match	Aggregate
1981	African Cup of Champions Clubs	R1	(Lesotho) Linare	5–0	1–1	6–1
1981	African Cup of Champions Clubs	R2	(Nigeria) Shooting Stars	2–1	3–0	5–1
1981	African Cup of Champions Clubs	QF	(Algeria) JE Tizi-Ouzou	0–3	2–2	2–5
1982	African Cup of Champions Clubs	R1	Botswana Defence Force XI	2–2	2–1	4–3
1982	African Cup of Champions Clubs	R2	(Zaire) Saint-Éloi Lupopo	0–0	1–1	1–1 (a)
1983	African Cup of Champions Clubs	R1	(Kenya) AFC Leopards	5–1	0–3	5–4
1983	African Cup of Champions Clubs	R2	(Egypt) Al Ahly	1–4	1–2	2–6
1984	African Cup of Champions Clubs	R1	(Madagascar) HTMF Mahajanga	3–0	2–0 (Note: HTMF Mahajanga withdrew after the first leg, Dynamos were awarded a 2–0 win.)	5–0
1984	African Cup of Champions Clubs	R2	(Uganda) Kampala City Council	0–0	2–1	2–1
1984	African Cup of Champions Clubs	QF	(Algeria) JE Tizi-Ouzou	2–0	0–2	2–2
1986	African Cup of Champions Clubs	R1	(Tanzania) Maji Maji	5–1	2–0 (Note: Maji Maji withdrew after the first leg, Dynamos were awarded a 2–0 win.)	7–1
1986	African Cup of Champions Clubs	R2	(Egypt) Zamalek	1–2	0–2	1–4
1987	African Cup of Champions Clubs	R1	(Eswatini) Mbabane Highlanders	6–1	2–1	8–2
1987	African Cup of Champions Clubs	R2	(Zaire) Lupopo	3–1	1–1	4–2
1987	African Cup of Champions Clubs	QF	(Cameroon) Canon Yaoundé	1–2	1–1	2–3
1989	African Cup Winners' Cup	R1	(Madagascar) BFV	1–1	0–1	1–2
1990	African Cup of Champions Clubs	R1	(Angola) Petro Atlético	1–1	1–1	1–1 (5–4 p)
1990	African Cup of Champions Clubs	R2	(Sudan) Al-Hilal	2–1	0–1	2–2 (a)
1991	African Cup Winners' Cup	R1	(Mozambique) Maxaquene	5–1	2–0	7–1
1991	African Cup Winners' Cup	R2	(Republic of the Congo) Diables Noirs	2–0	1–1	3–1
1991	African Cup Winners' Cup	QF	(Nigeria) BCC Lions	1–1	0–3	1–4
1995	African Cup of Champions Clubs	R1	(Sudan) Al-Hilal	1–0	1–0	2–0
1995	African Cup of Champions Clubs	R2	(Algeria) Chaouia	1–1	3–2	4–3
1995	African Cup of Champions Clubs	QF	(Uganda) Express	1–0	1–2	2–2 (a)
1996	African Cup of Champions Clubs	R1	(Kenya) Gor Mahia	1–0	1–0	2–0
1996	African Cup of Champions Clubs	R2	(Nigeria) Shooting Stars	1–5	3–1	4–6
1997	African Cup Winners' Cup	PR	(Tanzania) Sigara	0–1	3–0	3–1
1997	African Cup Winners' Cup	R1	(Malawi) Bata Bullets	1–0	1–0	2–0
1997	African Cup Winners' Cup	R2	(South Africa) Jomo Cosmos	2–1	0–2	2–3
1998	CAF Champions League	R1	(Malawi) Telecom Wanderers	2–1	2–1	4–2
1998	CAF Champions League	R2	(Mozambique) Ferroviário Maputo	1–1	1–0	2–1
1998	CAF Champions League	GS, GA	(Nigeria) Eagle Cement	3–0	1–0	N/A
1998	CAF Champions League	GS, GA	(Ghana) Accra Hearts of Oak	1–1	0–1	N/A
1998	CAF Champions League	GS, GA	(Tunisia) Étoile du Sahel	1–0	0–1	N/A
1998	CAF Champions League	F	(Ivory Coast) ASEC Mimosas	0–0	2–4	2–4
1999	CAF Champions League	R1	Lesotho Defence Force	3–0	1–0	4–0
1999	CAF Champions League	R2	(Burundi) Vital'O	2–0	1–0	3–0
1999	CAF Champions League	GS, GB	(Réunion) Saint-Louisienne	0–1	7–2	N/A
1999	CAF Champions League	GS, GB	(Tunisia) Espérance	0–2	0–1	N/A
1999	CAF Champions League	GS, GB	(Ivory Coast) ASEC Mimosas	0–2	2–1	N/A
2004	CAF Confederation Cup	PR	(Mauritius) Savanne	0–0	3–0	3–0
2004	CAF Confederation Cup	R32	(Ghana) King Faisal Babes	0–1	0–4	0–5
2008	CAF Champions League	PR	(Eswatini) Royal Leopards	1–0	2–0	3–0
2008	CAF Champions League	R1	(Mozambique) Costa do Sol	3–0	1–2	4–2
2008	CAF Champions League	R2	(Tunisia) Étoile du Sahel	1–0	1–0	2–0
2008	CAF Champions League	GS, GA	(Ivory Coast) ASEC Mimosas	2–1	2–1	N/A
2008	CAF Champions League	GS, GA	(Egypt) Zamalek	0–1	1–0	N/A
2008	CAF Champions League	GS, GA	(Egypt) Al Ahly	1–2	0–1	N/A
2008	CAF Champions League	SF	(Cameroon) Coton Sport	0–1	0–4	0–5
2010	CAF Champions League	R1	(Democratic Republic of the Congo) Saint-Éloi Lupopo	1–0	1–0	2–0
2010	CAF Champions League	R2	(Botswana) Gaborone United	4–1	0–1	4–2
2010	CAF Champions League	GS, GA	(Democratic Republic of the Congo) TP Mazembe	0–2	1–2	N/A
2010	CAF Champions League	GS, GA	(Tunisia) Espérance	0–1	0–1	N/A
2010	CAF Champions League	GS, GA	(Algeria) ES Sétif	1–0	0–3	N/A
2011	CAF Champions League	R1	(Algeria) MC Alger	4–1	0–3	4–4 (a)
2012	CAF Champions League	R1	(Mozambique) Liga Muçulmana	2–2	1–0	3–2
2012	CAF Champions League	R2	(Tunisia) Espérance	0–6	1–1	1–7
2012	CAF Confederation Cup	PO	(Angola) Interclube	0–0	0–1	0–1
2013	CAF Champions League	PR	Lesotho Correctional Services	3–0	0–1	3–1
2013	CAF Champions League	R1	(Tunisia) Bizertin	0–3	1–0	1–3
2014	CAF Champions League	PR	(Botswana) Mochudi Centre Chiefs	3–0	0–1	3–1
2014	CAF Champions League	R1	(Democratic Republic of the Congo) Vita Club	0–0	0–1	0–1

== Backroom staff ==
=== Managerial history ===
Dates	Name	Notes
1976–1981	(Zimbabwe) Charles Zindoga Musabayane	
	(Zimbabwe) Moses "Bambo"/"Razor Man" Chunga	
	(Zimbabwe) Peter Fanuel	
	(Zimbabwe) Luke Masomere - January 2004	
1984–??	(Zimbabwe) Sunday "Mhofu" Chidzambwa	
2001	(Netherlands) Clemens Westerhof	
2003, 2005–2008	(Zimbabwe) Malcom Fourie	
2006–2008	(Zimbabwe) David Mandigora	
2008–2010	(Zimbabwe) Elvis "Chuchu" Chiweshe	
2010–2011	(Zimbabwe) Lloyd Mutasa	
2011–2014	(Zimbabwe) Callisto Pasuwa	
2015	(Zimbabwe) David "Yogi" Mandigora	
2015–2016	(Portugal) Paulo Jorge Silva	
2016–2018	(Zimbabwe) Lloyd Mutasa	
2019–2022	(Zimbabwe) Tonderayi Ndiraya	
Dec 2022–Aug 2023	(Zimbabwe) Herbert Maruwa	
Aug 2023–May 2025	(Zimbabwe) Genesis Mangombe (interim)	
May 2025–present	(Zimbabwe) Takesure Chinyama	
