= List of Zamalek SC records and statistics =

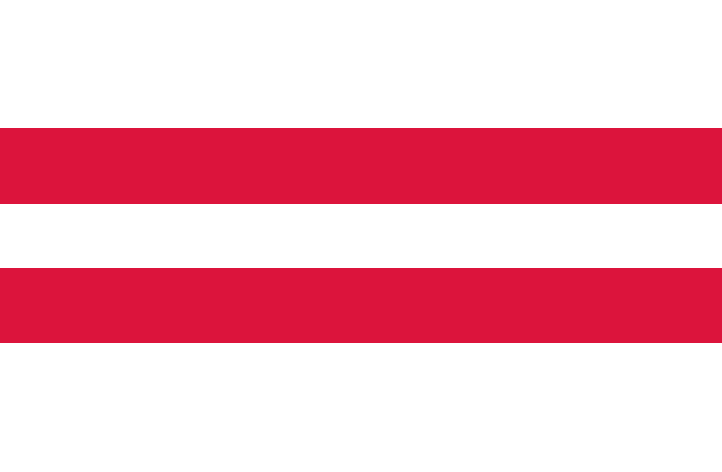
Zamalek SC colors

'Zamalek Football Club (Arabic: نادي الزمالك لكرة القدم, lit.: Nadi El Zamalek'), commonly referred to as Zamalek, is an Egyptian professional football club based in Cairo. The club is the most titled African club in the 20th century, considered one of the continent's giants. Zamalek is the first Egyptian club to win a title, as it was the first Egyptian team to win the Sultan Hussein Cup in 1921, the first team to win the Egypt Cup in 1922, and the first team to win the Cairo League in 1922–23. This article includes records and statistics related to Zamalek SC.

Zamalek is one of the most successful clubs in the history of Egyptian football in terms of the number of local championships, as the club has won fifteen Egyptian League titles, twenty-nine titles in the Egypt Cup, four titles in the Egyptian Super Cup, fourteen titles in the Cairo League and two titles in the Sultan Hussein Cup, one title of the October League Cup, three titles of King Fouad Cup, one title of each of the Egyptian Friendship Cup and the Egyptian Confederation Cup.

At the African level, they had achieved fourteen African continental titles by winning the CAF Champions League five times, the CAF Confederation Cup twice, and the African Cup Winners' Cup once, five times in the CAF Super Cup, in addition to winning two titles of the Afro-Asian Club Championship. At the Arab level, Zamalek won the Arab Club Champions Cup once and the Egyptian-Saudi Super Cup twice. The Zamalek football team is the most victorious African team in the continental level in the 20th century, with 9 tournaments. The football team in Zamalek also won the title of the best club in the world according to the International Federation of Football History & Statistics (IFFHS) in February 2003.

This list encompasses the major honours won by Zamalek and records set by the club, their managers and their players. The player records section includes details of the club's leading goalscorers and those who have made most appearances in first team competitions.

All stats are accurate as of 20 May 2026.

== Honours ==
=== Worldwide / Intercontinental ===
==== Afro-Asian ====
- Afro-Asian Cup
  - Winners (2): 1987, 1997 (record)
  - Runners-up (1): 1994

=== Continental ===
==== African ====
- CAF Champions League
  - Winners (5): 1984, 1986, 1993, 1996, 2002
  - Runners-up (3): 1994, 2016, 2020
- African Cup Winners' Cup
  - Winners (1): 2000
- CAF Confederation Cup
  - Winners (2): 2019, 2024
  - Runners-up (1): 2026
- CAF Super Cup
  - Winners (5): 1994, 1997, 2003, 2020, 2024
  - Runners-up (1): 2001

=== Regional ===
==== UAFA ====
- Arab Champions Cup
  - Winners (1): 2003
- Saudi-Egyptian Super Cup (League Winners)
  - Winners (2): 2003, 2018 (record)

=== Domestic ===
==== League ====
- Egyptian Premier League
  - Winners (15): 1959–60, 1963–64, 1964–65, 1977–78, 1983–84, 1987–88, 1991–92, 1992–93, 2000–01, 2002–03, 2003–04, 2014–15, 2020–21, 2021–22, 2025–26
  - Runners-up (34): 1950–51, 1952–53, 1953–54, 1955–56, 1956–57, 1957–58, 1958–59, 1960–61, 1961–62, 1962–63, 1965–66, 1972–73, 1976–77, 1978–79, 1979–80, 1980–81, 1981–82, 1982–83, 1984–85, 1985–86, 1986–87, 1988–89, 1994–95, 1995–96, 1996–97, 1997–98, 1998–99, 2005–06, 2006–07, 2009–10, 2010–11, 2015–16, 2018–19, 2019–20
- Cairo League
  - Winners (14): 1922–23, 1928–29, 1929–30, 1931–32, 1933–34, 1939–40, 1940–41, 1943–44, 1944–45, 1946–47, 1948–49, 1950–51, 1951–52, 1952–53
  - Runners-up (6): 1936–37, 1937–38, 1941–42, 1942–43, 1945–46, 1957–58

==== Cup ====
- Egypt Cup
  - Winners (29): 1921–22, 1931–32, 1934–35, 1937–38, 1940–41, 1942–43, 1943–44, 1951–52, 1954–55, 1956–57, 1957–58, 1958–59, 1959–60, 1961–62, 1974–75, 1976–77, 1978–79, 1987–88, 1998–99, 2001–02, 2007–08, 2012–13, 2013–14, 2014–15, 2015–16, 2017–18, 2018–19, 2020–21, 2024–25
  - Runners-up (14): 1927–28, 1930–31, 1932–33, 1933–34, 1941–42, 1947–48, 1948–49, 1952–53, 1962–63, 1977–78, 1991–92, 2005–06, 2006–07, 2010–11, 2022–23
- Egyptian Super Cup
  - Winners (4): 2001–02, 2002–03, 2016–17, 2019–20
  - Runners-up (5): 2003–04, 2004–05, 2008–09, 2014–15, 2015–16
- Sultan Hussein Cup
  - Winners (2): 1920–21, 1921–22
  - Runners-up (3): 1923–24, 1929–30, 1936–37
- King's Cup
  - Winners (3): 1924–25, 1933–34, 1940–41 (record)
- Egyptian Friendship Cup
  - Winners (1): 1986 (record)
- October League Cup
  - Winners (1): 1973–74 (record)
- Egypt Confederation Cup (association football)
  - Winners (1): 1995

=== Defunct ===
- Bolanchi Challenge Cup
  - Winners (1): 1913
- Egyptian Television Cup (Association Football)
  - Winners (4): 1971, 1982, 1984, 1996

=== Friendly ===
- Official Love Tournament
  - Winners (1): 1999
- Egyptian-Algerian friendship Cup (organized by Zamalek)
  - Winners (1): 2014
- Dubai Challenge Cup
  - Winners (1): 2024
- Independence Cup (Friendship Cup)
  - Winners (2): 1987, 1988
- Alexandria Summer League
  - Winners (3): 1982, 1984, 2004
- Giza League
  - Winners (1): 1963–64
- Jordan International Cup (Egyptian-Jordanian Cup)
  - Winners (2): 1986, 1987
- Friendship International Cup
  - Winners (2): 1970, 1988

All trophies are approved by Egyptian football Association website and Zamalek SC Official Facebook page.

== Players ==
=== Appearances ===
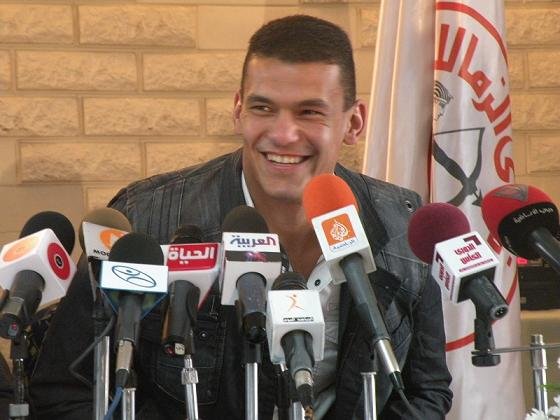
Abdel-Wahed El-Sayed, Zamalek's all-time leader in appearances

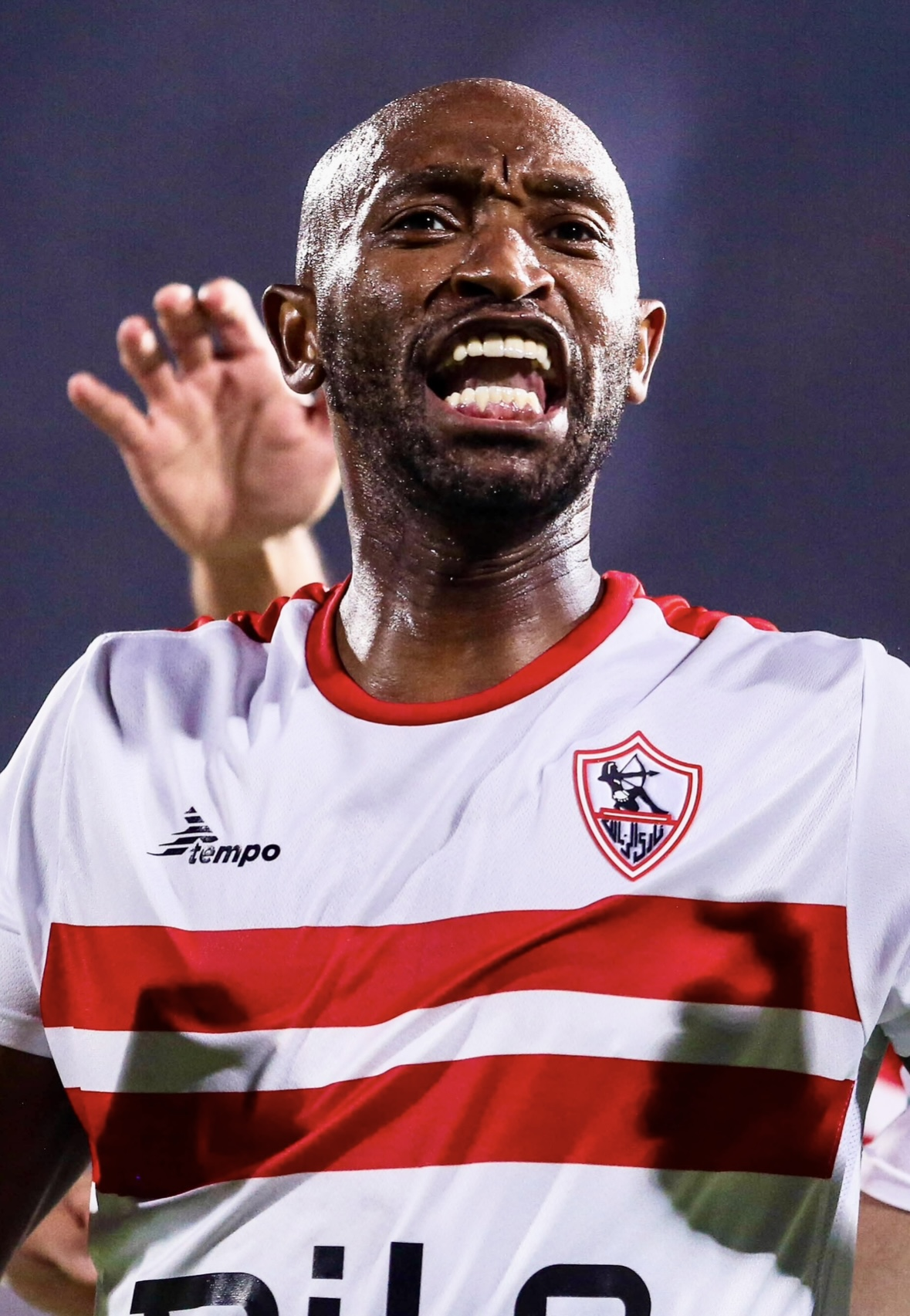
Shikabala, Zamalek's 2nd all-time appearance maker

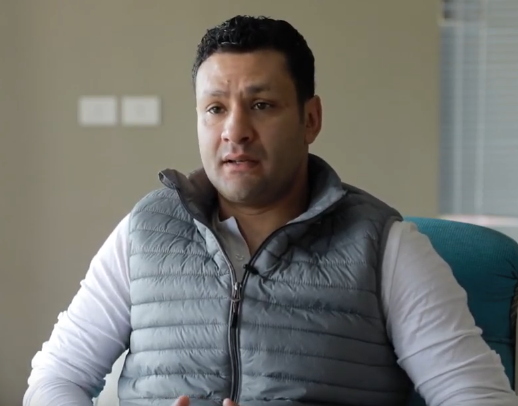
Mohamed Aboul Ela, Zamalek's 5th all-time appearance maker

| Rank | Name | Years | League | Cup | Super Cup | African | Arab | Total |
|---|---|---|---|---|---|---|---|---|
| 1 | (Egypt) Abdel-Wahed El-Sayed | 1997–2014 | 345 | 40 | 4 | 88 | 27 | 504 (0) |
| 2 | (Egypt) Shikabala | 2002–2005; 2006–2014; 2016–2017; 2019–2025 | 270 | 48 | 5 | 69 | 10 | 404 (70) |
| 3 | (Egypt) Abdel Halim Ali | 1999–2009 | 219 | 27 | 3 | 58 | 32 | 339 (138) |
| 4 | (Egypt) Tarek El-Sayed | 1995–2008 | 207 | 23 | 2 | 56 | 35 | 323 (26) |
| 5 | (Egypt) Mohamed Aboul Ela | 1999–2009 | 144 | 27 | 3 | 51 | 31 | 248 (11) |
| 6 | (Egypt) Besheer El-Tabei | 1997–2004; 2007–2008 | 146 | 21 | 2 | 42 | 22 | 223 (11) |
| 7 | (Egypt) Wael El-Quabbani | 1999–2004; 2005–2007 | 126 | 31 | 3 | 38 | 3 | 231 (8) |
| 8 | (Egypt) Gamal Hamza | 2000–2009; 2007–2008 | 145 | 17 | 1 | 33 | 33 | 229 (74) |
| 9 | (Egypt) Hazem Emam (footballer, born 1988) | 2008–2016; 2017–2022 | 151 | 18 | 0 | 54 | 4 | 227 (10) |
| 10 | (Egypt) Mahmoud Fathalla | 2008–2016; 2007–2014 | 145 | 12 | 0 | 47 | 0 | 204 (50) |

=== Top-scorers ===
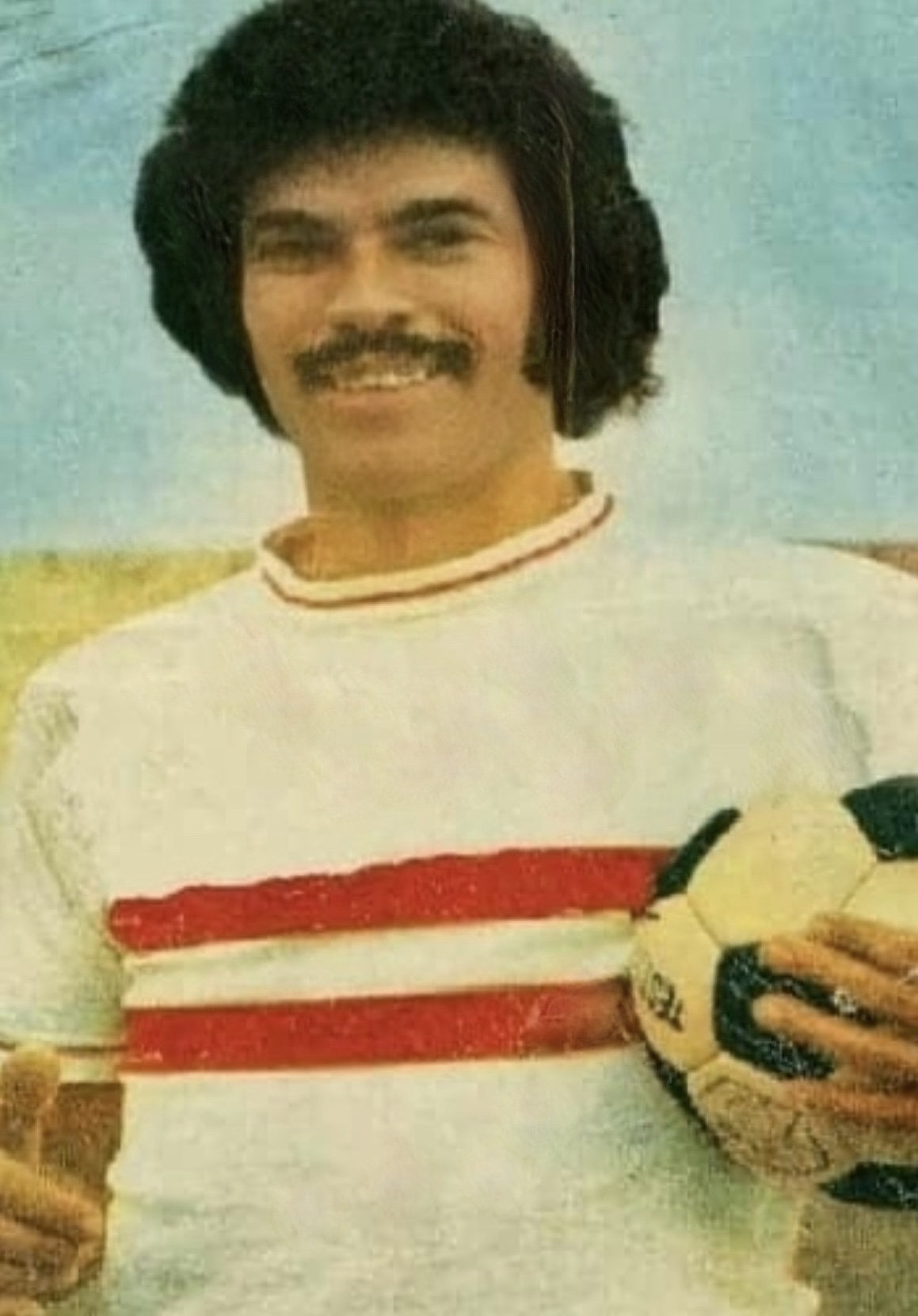
Hassan Shehata

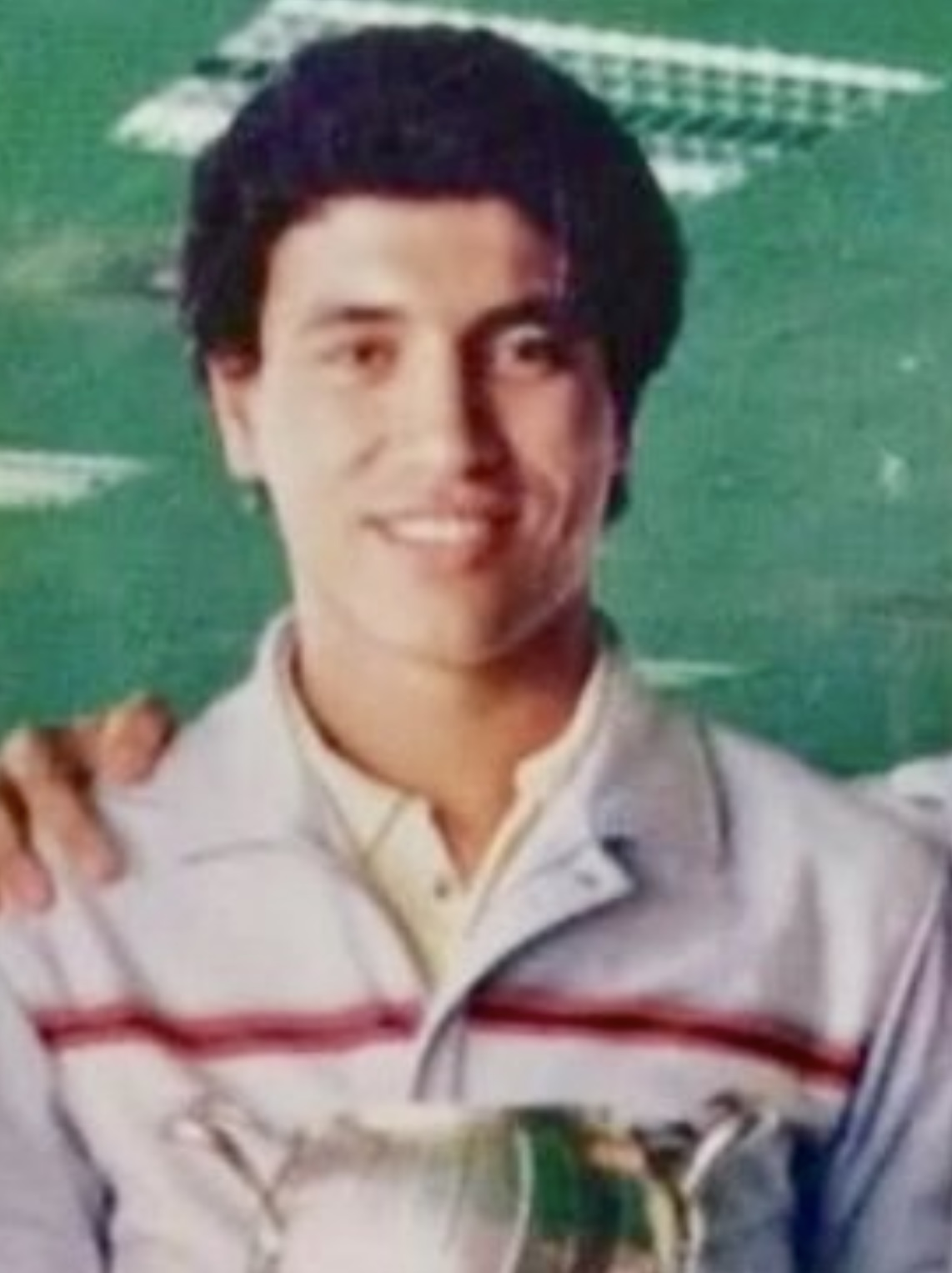
Gamal Abdel-Hamid

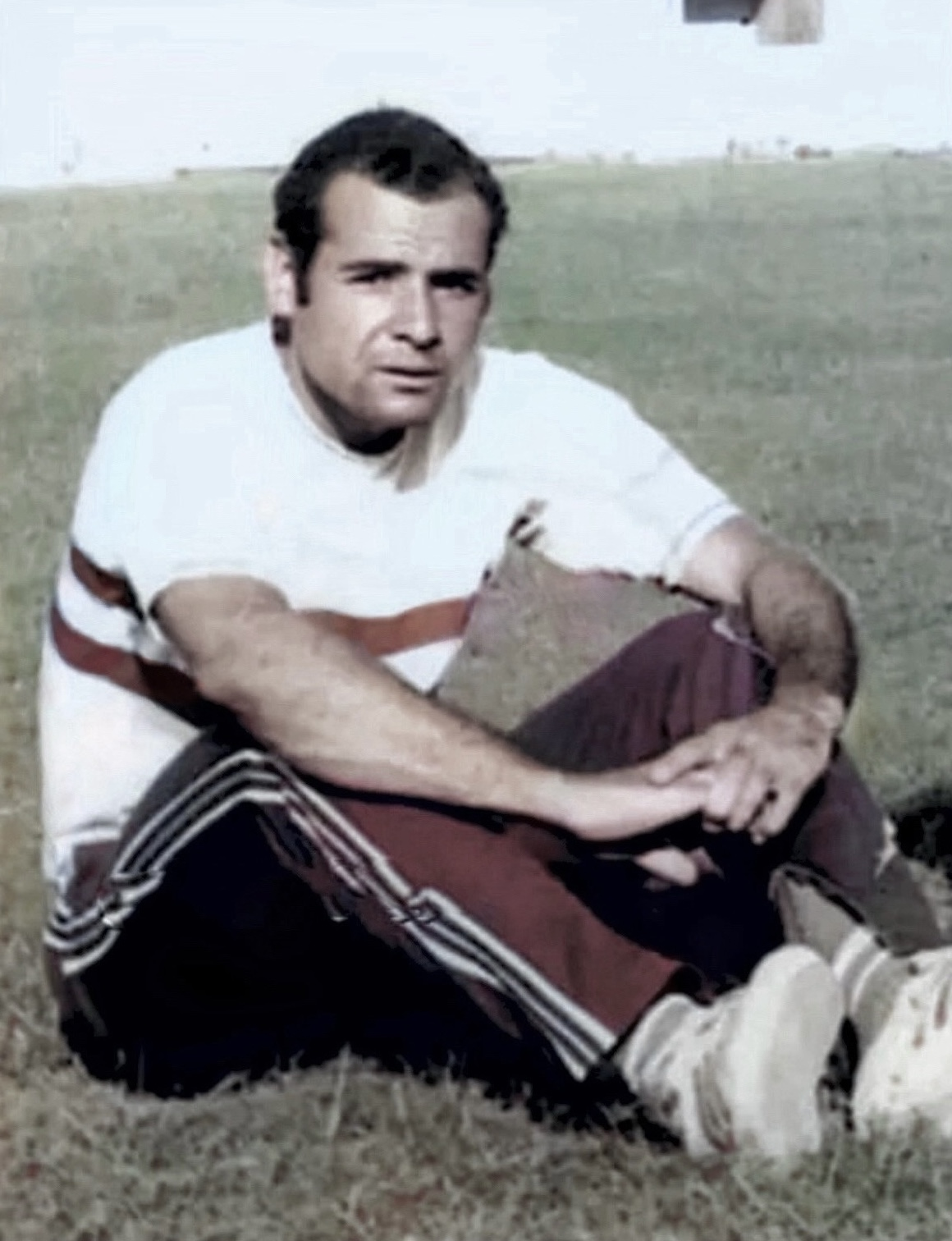
Ali Khalil

| Rank | Player | Time | League | Cup | October League Cup | Confederation | African | Afro-Asian | Arab | Total |
|---|---|---|---|---|---|---|---|---|---|---|
| 1 | Abdel Halim Ali | 1999-2009 | 80 (210) | 18 (27) | 0 (3) | 0 | 23 (58) | 0 | 23 (13) | 134 (330) |
| 2 | Hassan Shehata | 1967-1969 1973-1983 | 77 | 10 | 9 | 0 | 6 | 0 | 0 | 102 |
| 3 | Gamal Abdel Hamid | 1984-1994 | 73 | 7 | 0 | 0 | 16 | 1 | 0 | 97 |
| 4 | Ali Khalil | 1970-1980 | 78 | 12 | 1 | 0 | 3 | 0 | 0 | 94 |
| 5 | Alaa El-Hamouly | 1949-1962 | 68 | 23 | 0 | 0 | 0 | 0 | 0 | 91 |
| 6 | Ahmed Sayed | 2019-2025 | 61 (164) | 8 (16) | 0 | 0 | 14 (17) | 0 | 1 (3) | 86 |
| 7 | Hamada Emam | 1957-1974 | 74 | 10 | 0 | 0 | 0 | 0 | 0 | 84 |
| 8 | Gamal Hamza | 2000-2009 | 46 (145) | 10 (17) | 0 | 0 | 10 (33) | 0 | 8 (33) | 74 (229) |
| 9 | Tarek Yehia | 1981-1992 | 51 | 6 | 0 | 4 | 10 | 0 | 0 | 71 |
| 10 | Shikabala | 2002–2005; 2006–2014; 2016–2017; 2019–2025 | 50 (276) | 10 (48) | 0 | 0 | 10 (69) | 0 | 0 | 70 (393) |

- Most goals scored in all competitions: 138 – Abdel Halim Ali
- Most goals scored in the Egyptian Premier League: 81 – Abdel Halim Ali
- Most goals scored in October League Cup: 9 - Hassan Shehata
- Most goals scored in the Egypt Cup: 23 – Alaa El-Hamouly
- Most goals scored in all African competitions: 23 – Abdel Halim Ali
- Most goals scored in all Arabian competitions: 13 – Abdel Halim Ali

=== Individual ===
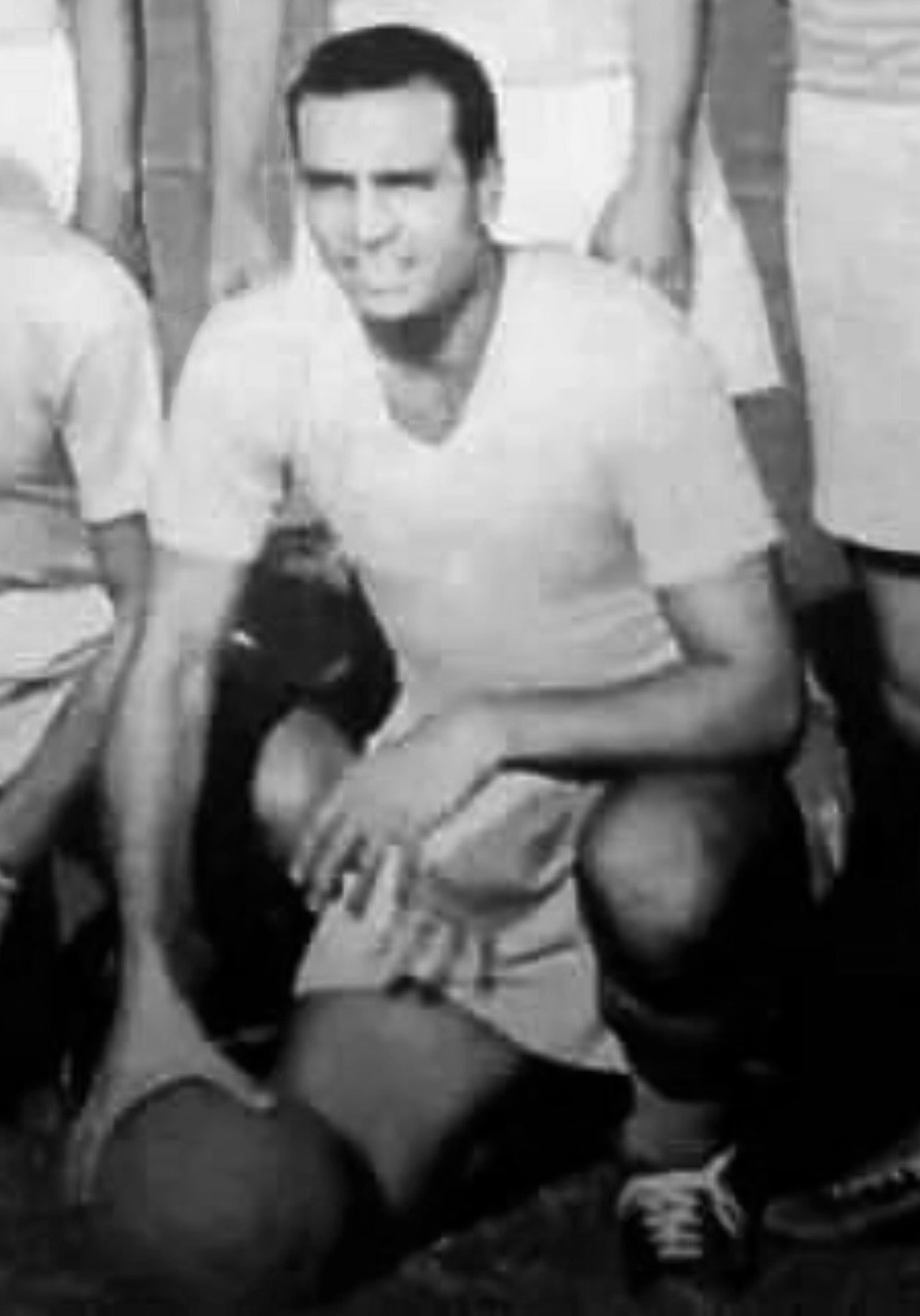
Alaa El-Hamouly, Zamalek's all-time top scorer of the Egypt Cup

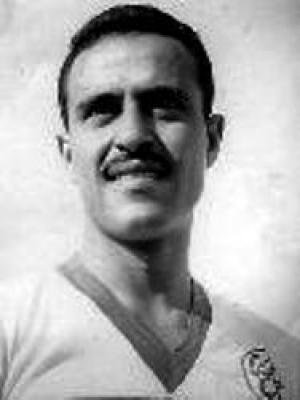
Ali Mohsen, League's top-scorer in 1960–61 season

==== League ====
- Ayman Younes scored the fastest goal in 1990 against Suez after 13 seconds.
- Mohamed Amin scored the first goal in the Egyptian League against El Masry.
- Saad Rostom scored the first hat-trick for Zamalek in the league against El Masry.

The following players have won the top scorer award in the league while playing with Zamalek:

| Season | Player | Goals |
|---|---|---|
| 1960–61 | (Yemen) Ali Mohsen | 16 |
| 1976–77 | (Egypt) Ali Khalil | 17 |
| 1976–77 | (Egypt) Hassan Shehata | 17 |
| 1978–79 | (Egypt) Ali Khalil | 12 |
| 1979–80 | (Egypt) Hassan Shehata | 14 |
| 1987–88 | (Egypt) Gamal Abdel-Hamid | 11 |
| 1997–98 | (Egypt) Abdul Hamid Bassiouny | 15 |
| 2000–01 | (Egypt) Tarek El-Said | 13 |
| 2001–02 | (Egypt) Hossam Hassan | 18 |
| 2003–04 | (Egypt) Abdel Halim Ali | 21 |
| 2010–11 | (Egypt) Shikabala | 13 |
| 2021–22 | (Egypt) Ahmed Sayed | 19 |

==== Cup ====
- Hussein Yasser scored the fastest goal in the cup against Al Ahly in 2010 after 46 seconds.
- Alaa El-Hamouly is Zamalek's all-time top scorer in the cup.

=== Captaincy ===
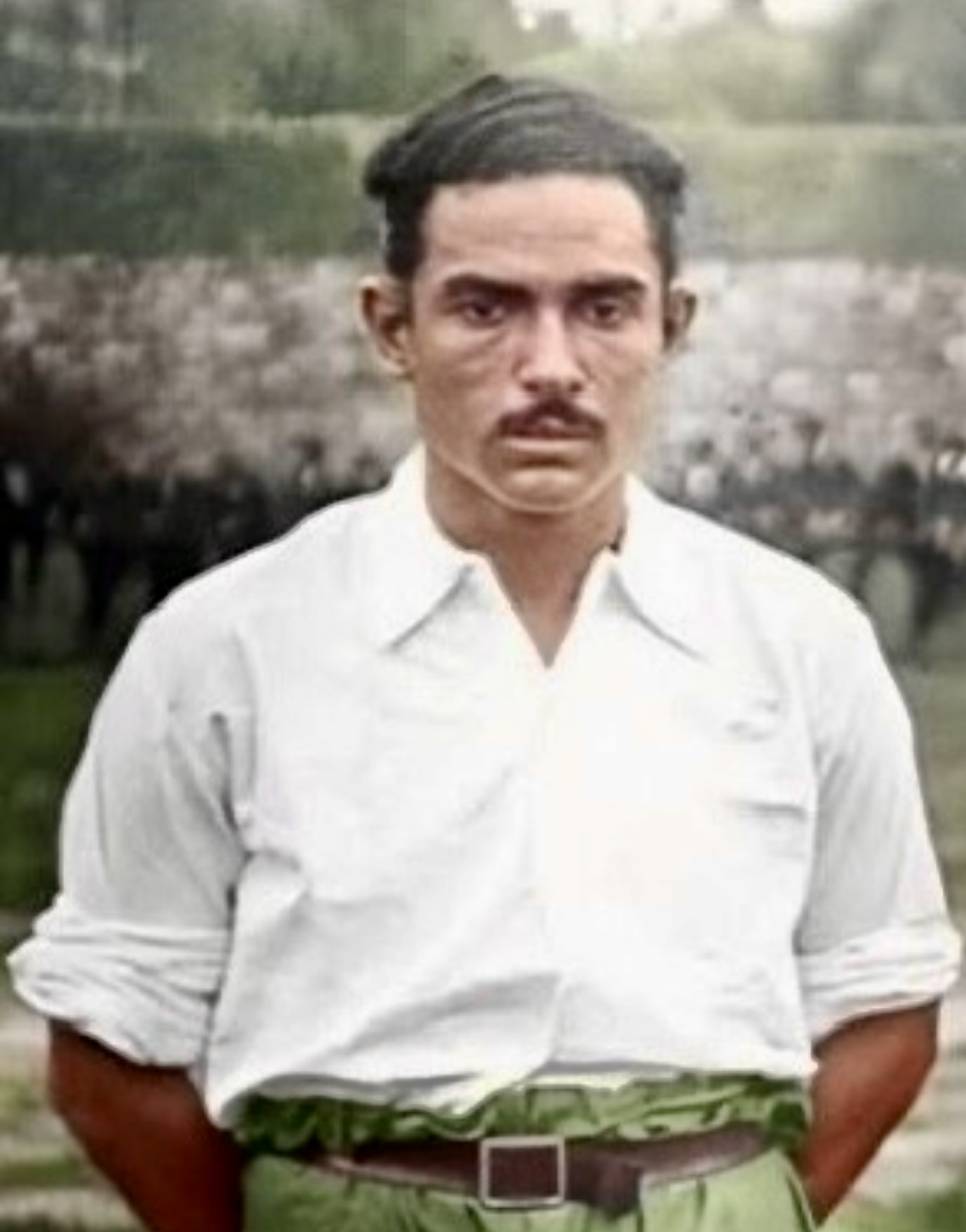
Tewfik Abdullah, 3rd captain in the club's history

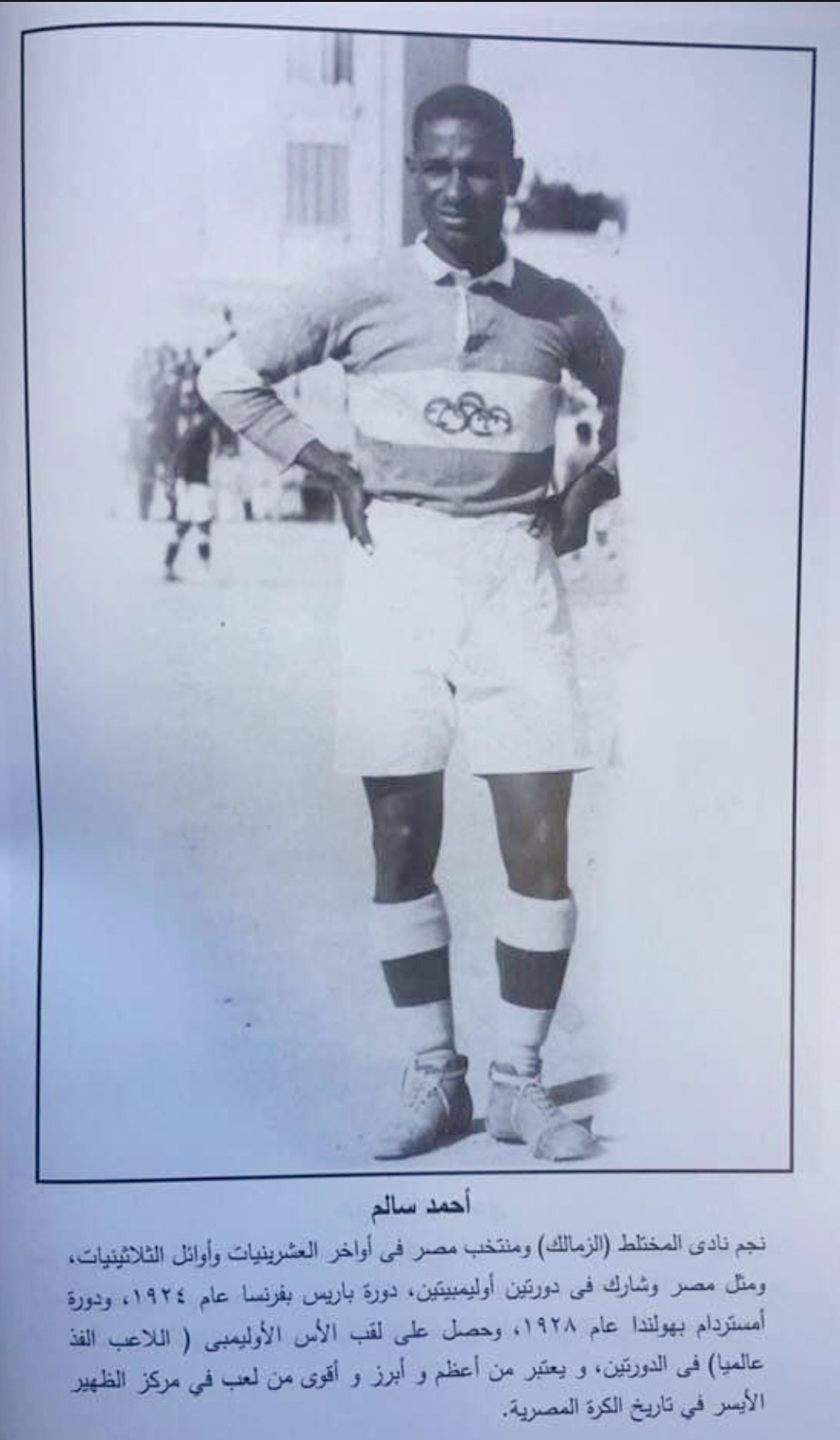
Ahmed Salem, 8th captain in the club's history

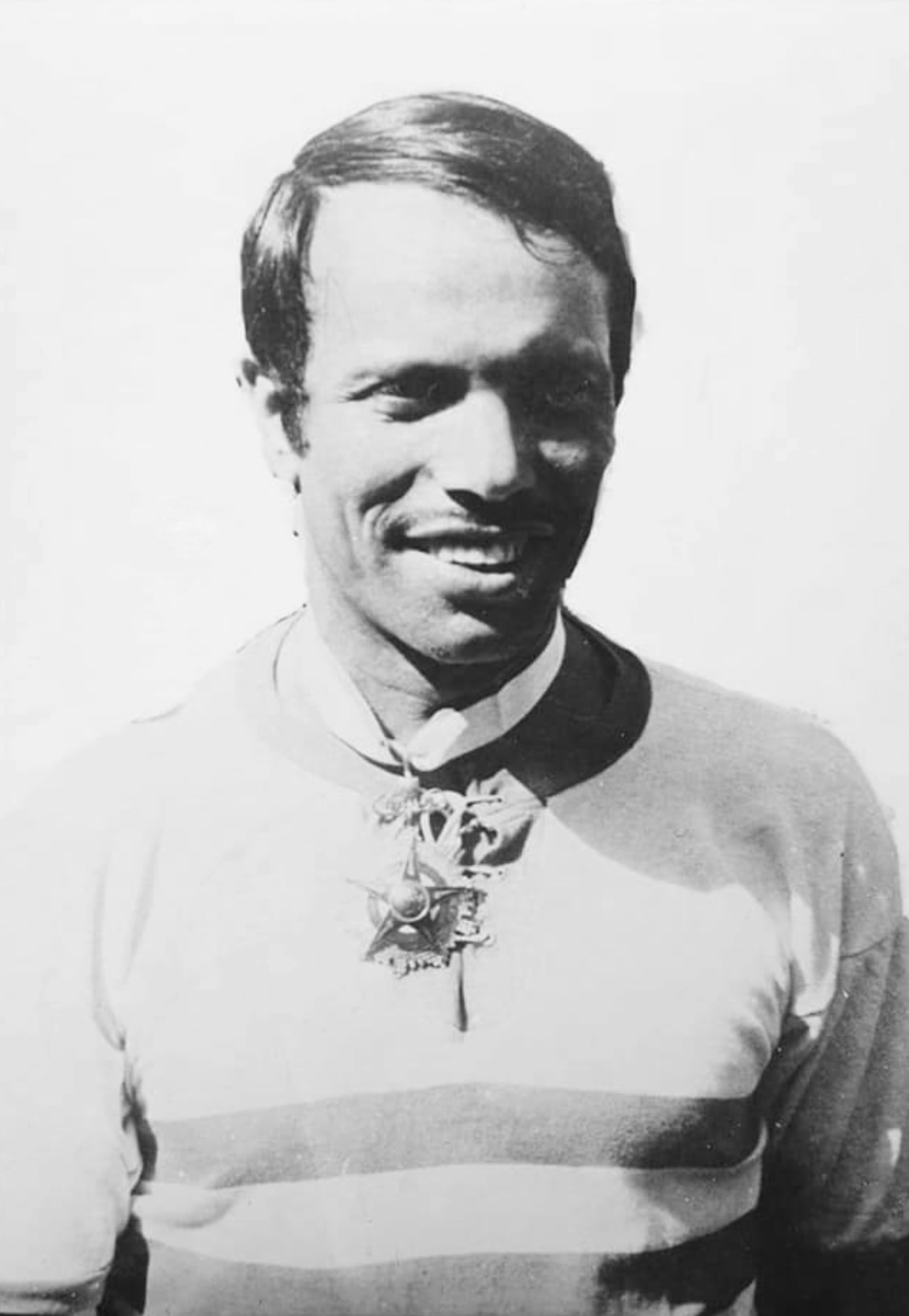
Yakan Hussein, longest serving captain in the club's history

- Total number of club captains – 31 players
- Most titles as captain: 10 – (Egypt) Mohamed Latif (1936–1945), (Egypt) Shikabala, (2016–2017, 2019–2025)
- Longest serving captains: 12 years – (Egypt) Yakan Hussein (1960–1972)
- Shortest serving captains: 1 season – 2 players
- First club captain – (Egypt) Ahmed Kadry
- First official club captain – (Egypt) Amin Gabriel in 1917 Sultan Hussein Cup, 1917
- Youngest serving captain: 21 years – (Egypt) Tawfik Abdullah, 1918
- Oldest serving captain: 35 years – (Egypt) Ahmed Halim, 1945

=== Team captains ===
Throughout its history, Zamalek has had 31 club captains. The following players have been official Zamalek captains.

| No. | Name |
|---|---|
| 1 | (Egypt) Ahmed Kadry |
| 2 | (Egypt) Amin Gabriel |
| 3 | (Egypt) Tewfik Abdullah |
| 4 | (Egypt) Mohamed Gabr |
| 5 | (Egypt) Ibrahim Yakan |
| 6 | (Egypt) Fouad Gamil |
| 7 | (Egypt) Mokhtar Fawzi |
| 8 | (Egypt) Ahmed Salem |
| 9 | (Egypt) Mohamed Latif |
| 10 | (Egypt) Mostafa Taha |
| 11 | (Egypt) Ahmed Halim |
| 12 | (Egypt) Yehia Emam |
| 13 | (Egypt) Hanafy Bastan |
| 14 | (Egypt) Nour El-Dali |
| 15 | (Egypt) Yakan Hussein |
| 16 | (Egypt) Hamada Emam |
| 17 | (Egypt) Taha Basry |
| 18 | (Egypt) Hassan Shehata |
| 19 | (Egypt) Farouk Gaafar |
| 20 | (Egypt) Ibrahim Youssef |
| 21 | (Egypt) Hisham Yakan |
| 22 | (Egypt) Ismail Youssef |
| 23 | (Egypt) Hussein El Sayed |
| 24 | (Egypt) Khaled El Ghandour |
| 25 | (Egypt) Hazem Emam |
| 26 | (Egypt) Abdel-Wahed El-Sayed |
| 27 | (Egypt) Hazem Emam II |
| 28 | (Egypt) Shikabala |
| 29 | (Egypt) Hazem Emam II |
| 30 | (Egypt) Shikabala |
| 31 | (Egypt) Omar Gaber |

== Awards ==
=== Club awards ===
==== Best Club in the World ====
Zamalek SC was named the best club in the world by the International Federation of Football History and Statistics (IFFHS) in February 2003.

==== Best Club in Africa ====
Zamalek SC was named the best club in Africa in 2003 by the Confederation of African Football.

=== Players awards ===
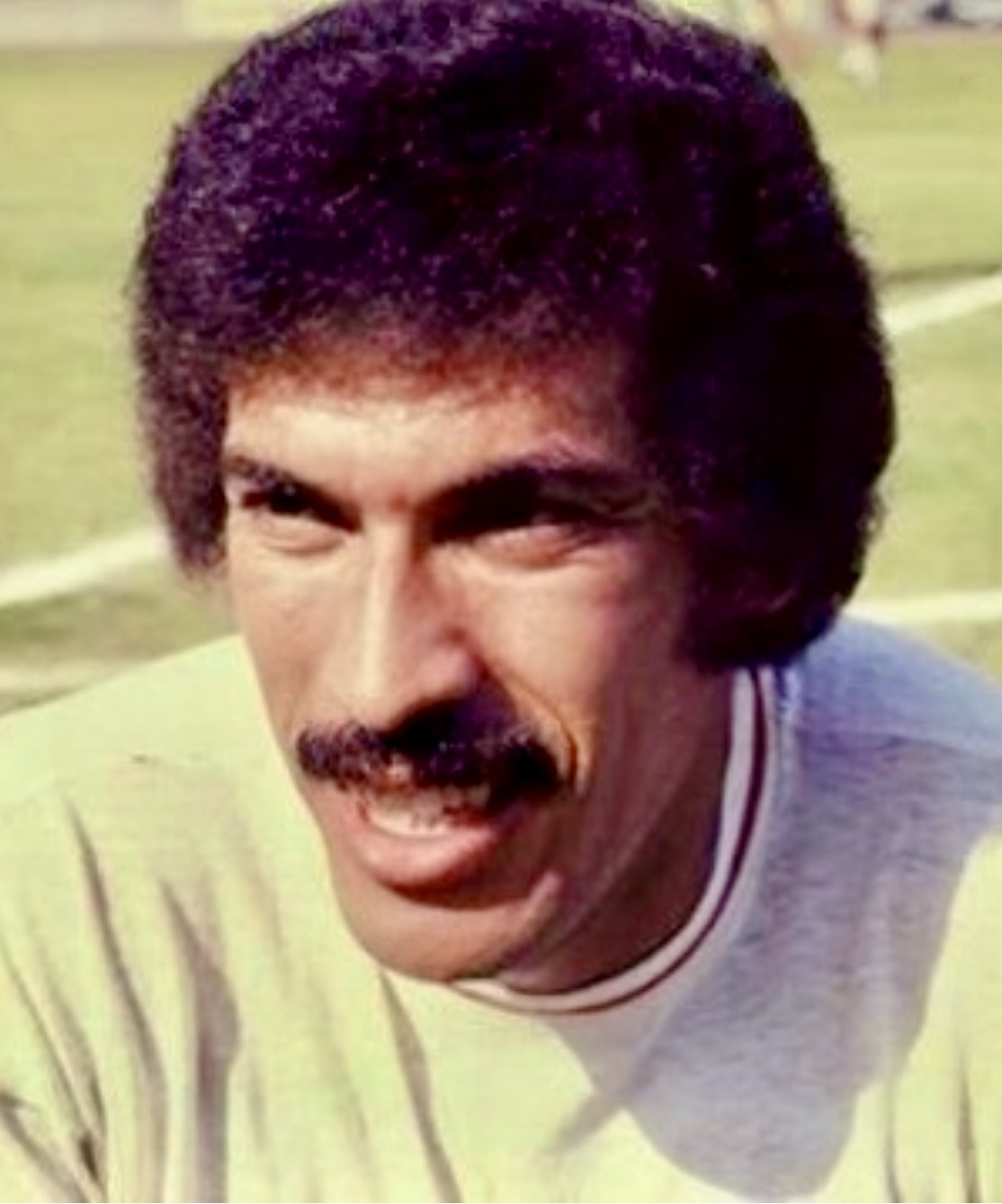
Hassan Shehata

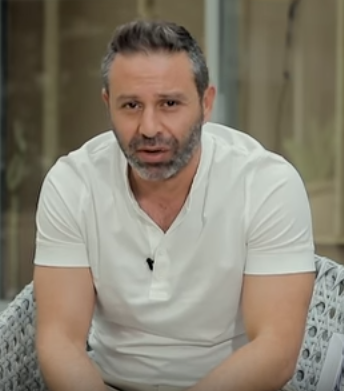
Hazem Emam

EFA Egyptian Player of the Year

- (Egypt) Hassan Shehata – 1976
- (Egypt) Ibrahim Youssef – 1984
- (Egypt) Tarek El-Said – 2001
- (Egypt) Hazem Emam – 2003
- (Egypt) Shikabala – 2011

Al-Ahram Hebdo Egyptian Best footballer award

The following players won Al-Ahram Hebdo Egyptian Best footballer award while playing for Zamalek:

- (Egypt) Ahmed El-Kass – 1994
- (Egypt) Ismail Youssef – 1996
- (Egypt) Tarek El-Said – 2000
- (Egypt) Hossam Hassan – 2001

Al-Shabab & Al-Reyada Annual Awards

The following players won Al-Shabab & Al-Reyada Annual Awards while playing for Zamalek:

- (Egypt) Ahmed El-Shenawy – 2015 (Best GK)
- (Egypt) Ali Gabr – 2015 (Best CD)
- (Egypt) Ibrahim Salah – 2015 (Best MF)

African Inter-Club Player of the Year (Based in Africa)

- (Egypt) Tarek Hamed – (2nd) 2019

African Legends

- (Egypt) Mahmoud El Gohary – 2012

Top African Stars of the 20th Century

- (Egypt) Ibrahim Youssef: (19th) IFFHS

Best Arab Player

- (Egypt) Ibrahim Youssef – 1984

== Team records ==
=== Matches ===
- First League match: Farouk (Zamalek) 5–1 El-Masry, Week 1, 22 October 1948.
- First Egypt Cup match: Mokhtalat (Zamalek) 4–0 Tersana SC, first round, 3 March 1922.
- First African Cup Winners' Cup match: Zamalek 3–0 Al Ahly (Tripoli), first round, 7 May 1976.
- First CAF Champions League match: Zamalek 2–1 Simba S.C., first round, 16 March 1979.
- First CAF Cup match: Zamalek 0–1 Gor Mahia, first round, 21 March 1998.
- First CAF Confederation Cup match: Rayon Sports 3–1, 2nd round, 15 March 2015.
