= Hassan Shehata =

Egyptian football manager (born 1947)

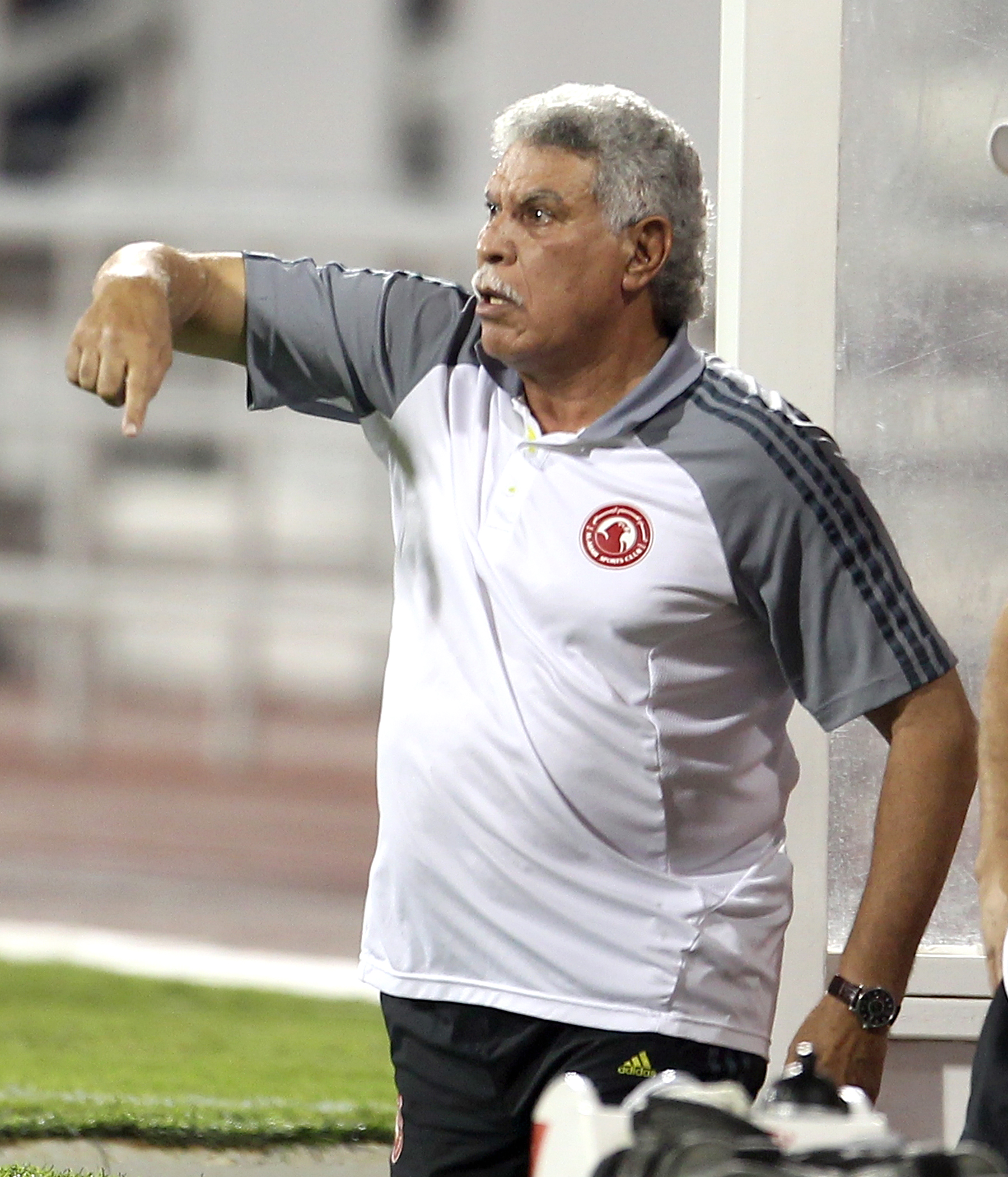
- Shehata in 2012

Personal information
- Full name: Hassan Hassan Shehata
- Date of birth: 19 June 1947 (age 79)
- Place of birth: Kafr El Dawwar, Beheira, Egypt
- Positions: Forward; attacking midfielder

Youth career
- Kafr El Dawar
- Zamalek

Senior career*
Years	Team	Apps	(Gls)
1966–1968	Zamalek		
1968–1973	Kazma		(49)
1973–1982	Zamalek		(77)

International career^{‡}
1970–1981	Egypt	52	(14)

Managerial career
- 1983–1985: Zamalek U20
- 1985–1986: Zamalek (assistant)
- 1986–1988: Al-Wasl
- 1989–1990: Al Merreikh SC
- 1990–1992: Ittihad El Shorta
- 1992–1993: Al Ittihad Alexandria
- 1993–1994: Ittihad El Shorta
- 1995–1996: Zamalek (assistant)
- 1996–1997: El Minya
- 1997–1998: El Sharkia
- 1998–1999: El Shams
- 1999: Al-Ahly Benghazi
- 1999–2000: Suez
- 2000: Al-Fujairah
- 2001: Dina Farms
- 2001–2003: Egypt U20
- 2003–2004: El Mokawloon
- 2004–2011: Egypt
- 2011–2012: Zamalek
- 2012: Al-Arabi
- 2014: Difaâ El Jadidi
- 2014–2015: El Mokawloon
- 2015–2016: Petrojet
- 2018–2020: FC Mauerwerk (technical advisor)
Medal record
Men's football
Representing Egypt (as player)
African Games
Bronze medal – third place	1973
Africa Cup of Nations
Third place	1974
Representing Egypt (as manager)
Africa Cup of Nations
Winner	2006
Winner	2008
Winner	2010
Arab Games
Gold medal – first place	2007
U-20 Africa Cup of Nations
Winner	2003
- * Club domestic league appearances and goals as of 15 February 2023 ‡ National team caps and goals as of 15 February 2023

Hassan Hassan Shehata (Egyptian Arabic: حسن شحاته; born 19 June 1947) is an Egyptian retired football manager and former professional football player who played as a forward. He is considered as one of the best forwards in the history of African football. He is nicknamed the "Master" (Egyptian Arabic: المعلم). As a manager, he led Egypt to three consecutive Africa Cup of Nations titles, in 2006, 2008 and 2010. He is the first coach to win three consecutive Africa Cup of Nations titles, and one of only two coaches to have won the AFCON three times, along with Ghana's Charles Gyamfi.

As a player, he is considered one of the greatest Egyptian footballers of all time. The songs and chants that the fans sang in his name are widely remembered among football fans in Egypt. Shehata started his career in Zamalek, he played almost his whole career with the Cairo giants. He is Zamalek's 2nd top scorer of all-time. In 1974, Shehata came 3rd in the African Player of the Year by France Football. Despite not winning the Africa Cup of Nations with Egypt as a player and only obtaining a bronze medal in the 1974 edition, however, as a manager, he won the title three consecutive times, becoming the only manager to make this achievement.

He stated in a press release that he is proud to be affiliated with the Zamalek Club, and stressed that he had spent the best days of his life inside the White Castle (Zamalek), and he was associated with great players during his career as a player in the team. Shehata pointed out that he is very proud of the Zamalek fans, who created the fame and stardom of all the players who played for the club throughout its long history, and that he considers the Zamalek fans to be the number one player in the system, and their support for the team has not differed over the ages.

== Early life ==
Hassan Shehata was born on June 19, 1947 in the city of Kafr El Dawwar, Beheira into an athletic family. He began playing football since he was ten years old when he was a student in Kafr El Dawwar primary school, then at Salah Salem Commercial Secondary School. As a child, Shehata joined Kafr El Dawwar Club, one of the Egyptian Second division A clubs at that time.

== Club career ==
=== Zamalek ===
After a friendly match with the Bahari team against the national team, Mohamed Hassan Helmy, the national team's football director, offered him to join Zamalek, and he agreed. In his first match with Zamalek, which was held in November 1966, Shehata succeeded in scoring a Hat-trick as Zamalek won 4-0.

=== Kazma Al Kuwaiti ===
After the outbreak of the 1967 war, the local competition in Egypt stopped, and Shehata joined the Kuwaiti football club Kazma SC. after Zamalek's approval. He achieved several successes in Kuwait, including winning the Asian footballer of the Year award in 1970. Thus, Shehata is the only player to win the title of best player in a continent other than his home one.

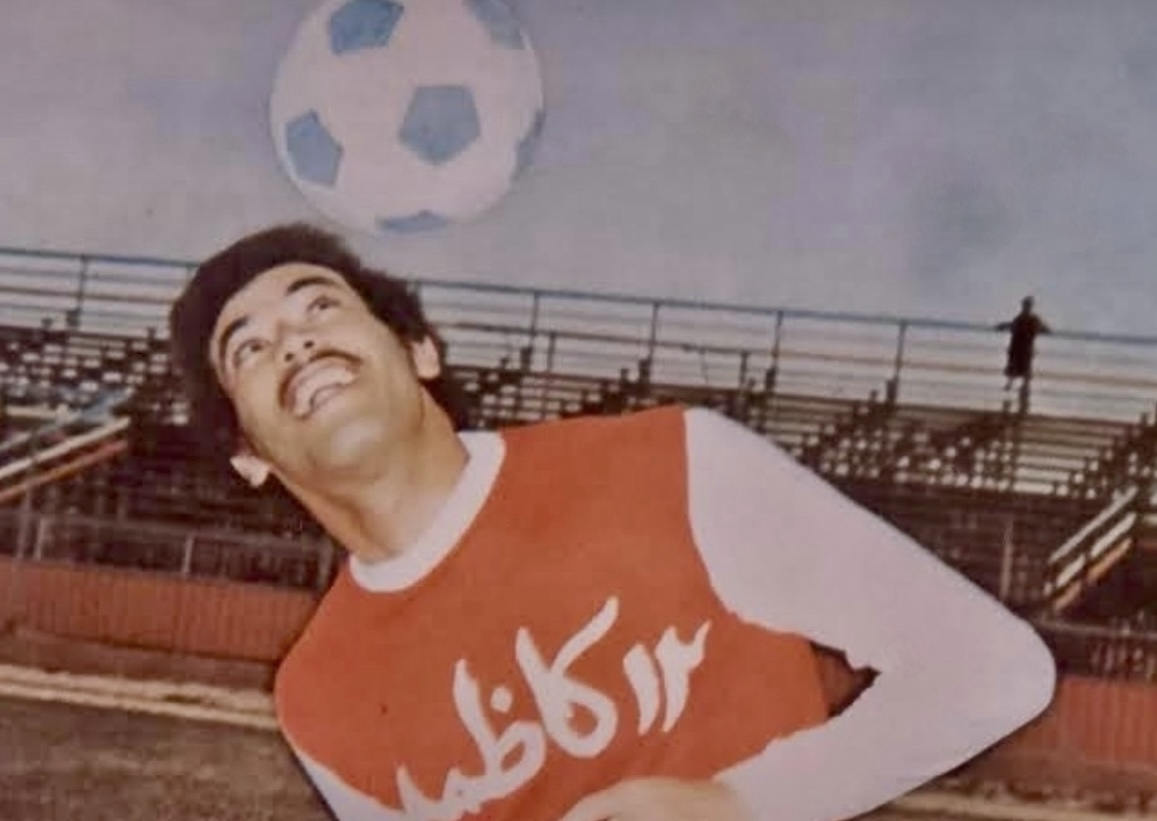
Shehata with Kazma in 1972

Shehata became Kuwaiti football rising star, he signed for Kazma while they were in the 2nd division and was a main reason for the qualification to the Premier League. Shehata had an outstanding record with Kazma in his five year spell. He was also recruited into the Kuwaiti Armed Forces and participated with the Kuwaiti national team in the World Military Championship in Bangkok, Thailand. He also participated with the Kuwait national football team in the AFC Asian Cup. Shehata scored a total of 85 goals for Kazma in all competitions. He also has a brief spell for Al Arabi SC and scored for them 3 goals in the AFC Champions League. Shehata wa Kuwaiti Premier League top scorer for 3 seasons (1969–70, 1970–71, 1971–72).

=== Return to Zamalek ===
Shehata returned to Egypt in October 1973 to continue his career with Zamalek. He played his first match on 5 October 1973, one day later, the 1973 war began. After the war, he played with Zamalek in the October League Cup which was launched instead of the Egyptian Premier League, and he was the top scorer with 9 goals and Zamalek won the cup, to be Shehata's first title with his club and the first of his career.

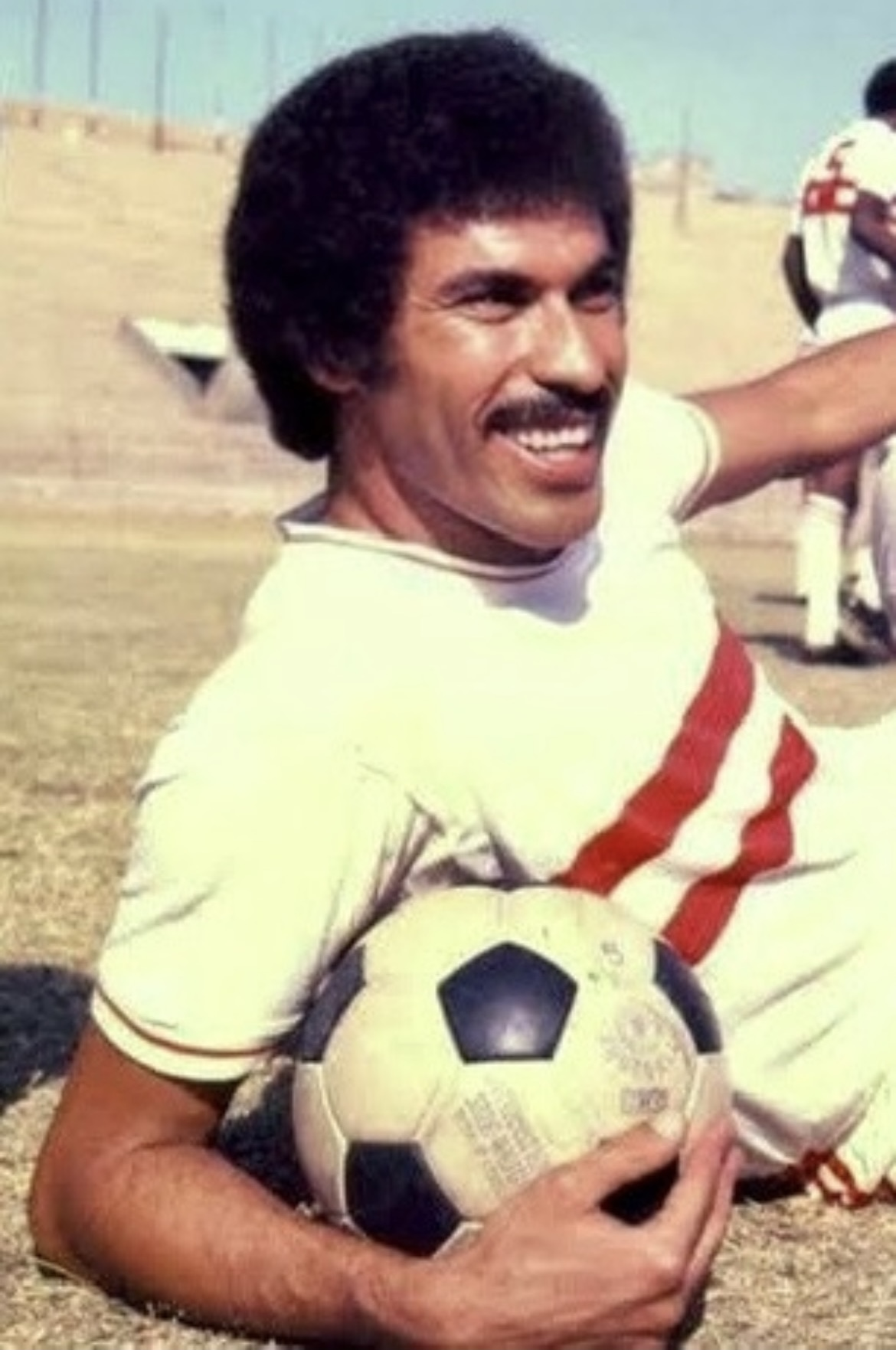
Shehata with Zamalek in 1975

In his first league season, Shehata scored 6 goals in the league and 4 goals in the 1974–75 Egypt Cup. He scored a total of 16 goals in 1975–76, and scored 3 continental goals; his and Zamalek's first African goal in the African football, and 13 goals in the league. In 1975, he scored his team's winning goal in the 1975 Egypt Cup final and lifted the cup for his first time and the 15th for Zamalek. He won with his team the 1977 Egypt Cup after defeating Ismaily in the final. In 1976–77 season, he finished as the league's top scorer (shared with Ali Khalil) with 17 goals. Shehata won with Zamalek the 1977–78 Egyptian Premier League title, and in 1979 Egypt Cup, he lifted his 3rd cup title and Zamalek's 17th.

Shehata was from a generation of the Egyptian football that was considered unlucky, for the cancellation of the football activities from 1967 to 1972 due to the 1967 War and the War of Attrition. He travelled to play in Kuwait while he was 20 years and returned to Egypt to start his career with Zamalek while he was 26, however, he scored 77 goals with Zamalek in 9 league seasons, 10 goals in Egypt Cup, 6 goals for Zamalek in the African competitions, and 9 goals in the October League Cup with a total of 102 goals in all competitions. Shehata was a key player for the team, and Zamalek fans and Egyptian media nicknamed him the "Master" chanting songs on his talent in scoring goals. One of the most famous chants in Egyptian football history is "Oh! Hassan Shehata, master, let the goal net speak", they want Shehata to make the goal net talk. A call that Zamalek fans have always repeated, grateful for their great and loyal star calling on him to score more, and this chant almost was enough for him to score. He was the Egyptian League top-scorer in the 1976–77 and 1979–80 seasons.

In 1980, Mohammed Hassan Helmy, the former Egyptian national football team coach, who brought Shehata to Zamalek in 1966, was the current president of Zamalek at the time, learned at the time that Shehata has decided to retire from football, but he believed that the team needed him to stay, and all attempts to persuade him to back down failed. The decision was made. A huge festival was held in Cairo Stadium, and Shehata played his retirement match against Al Ahly on 23 September 1980. It witnessed a large public presence, with film stars and celebrities of the Egyptian society present. At the end of that day, he signed a contract to train the U-20 team of Emirati club Al Wasl, and traveled to the Emirates to start his new job, a month later he returned to Cairo to bring his family to the Emirates.

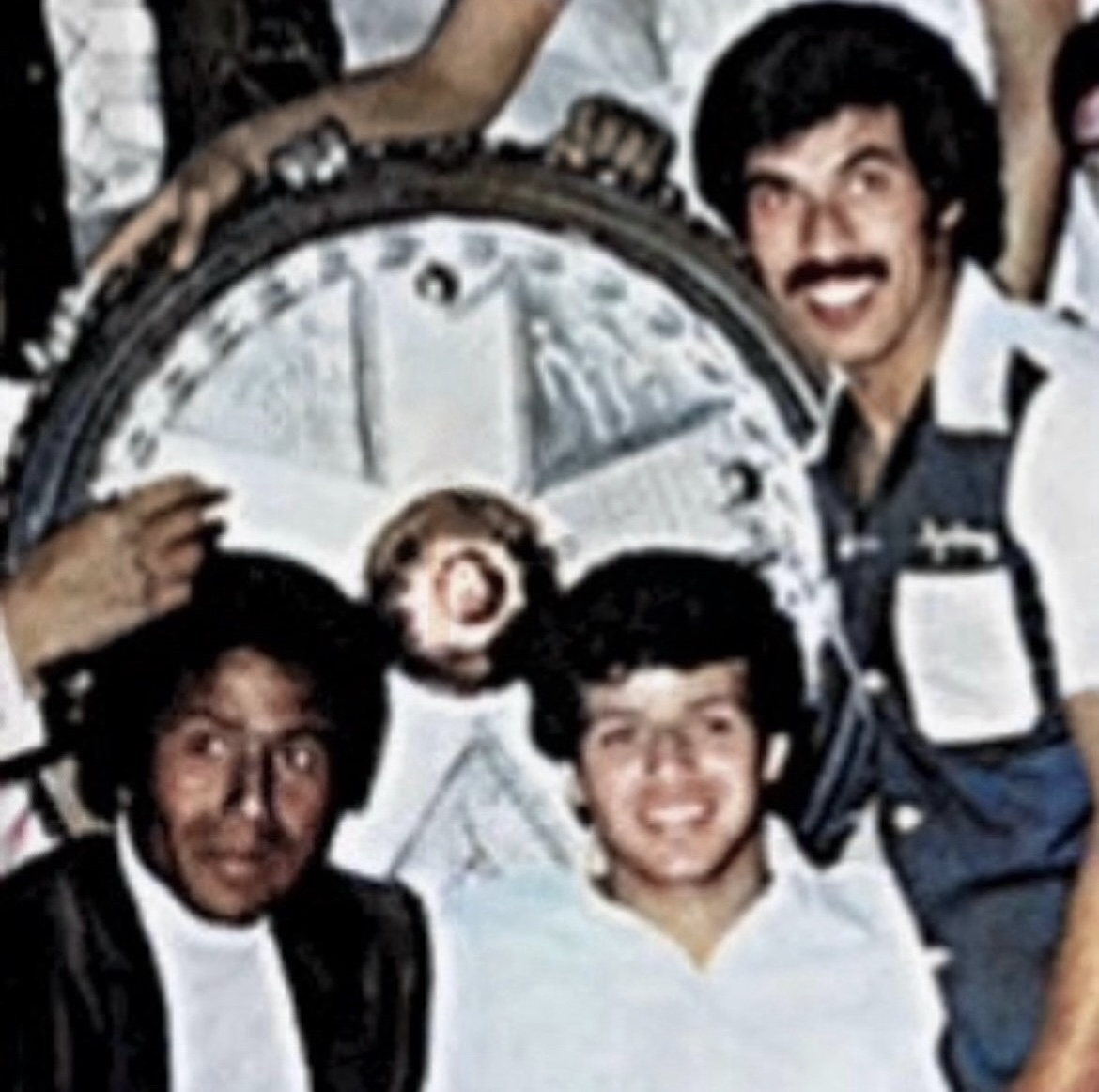
Zamalek players; Shehata (right), Taha Basry and Mohamed Salah with the Egyptian Premier League trophy in 1978

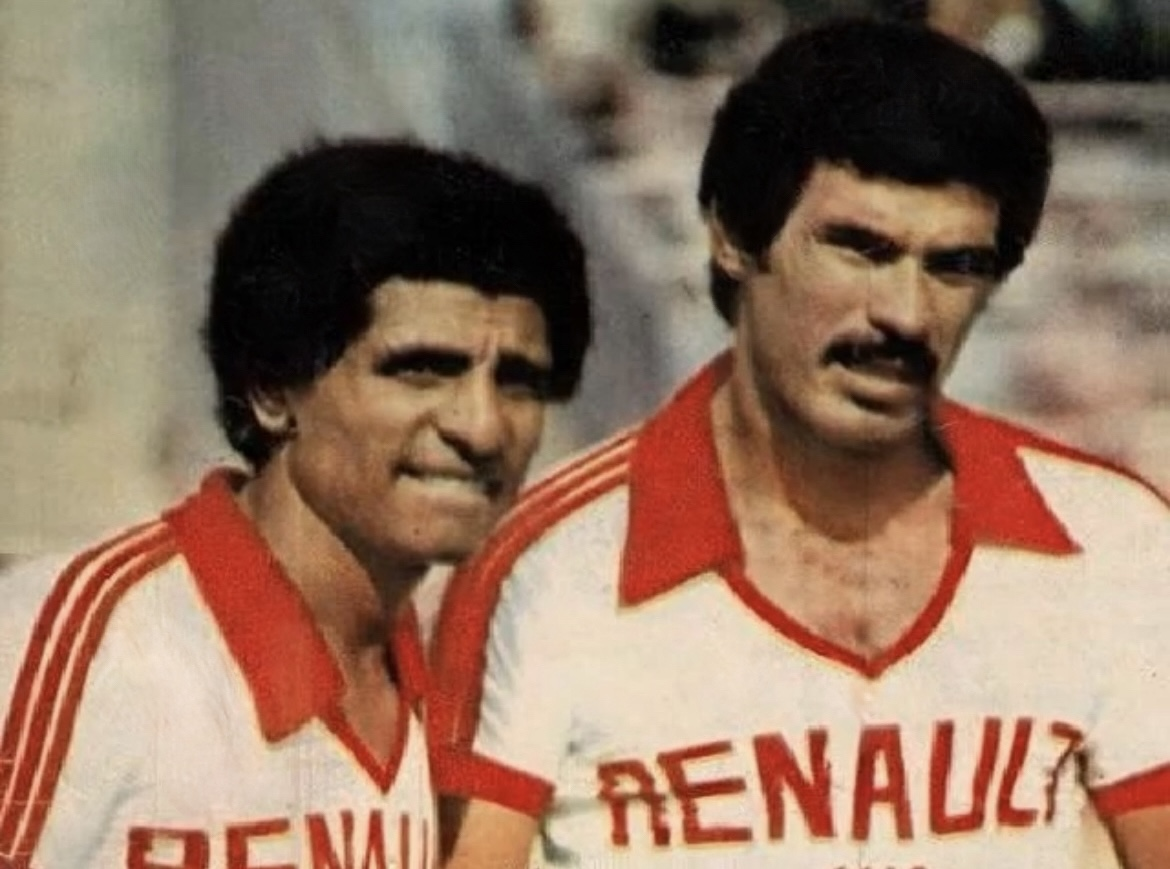
Shehata and Farouk Gaafar with Zamalek in 1981

Zamalek's president learned of Hassan Shehata’s return to Cairo, and sent someone to invite him to a tea party to bid farewell to him before his return to Dubai. Shehata arrived on time, to find thousands of the club's fans cheering for him and begging him to stay on the pitch, and his tears fell, and at this moment, Mohammed Hassan Helmy announced:

"Hassan Shehata informed me that he decided to return to playing in response to the demand of the Zamalek fans"

Shehata did not comment on the matter. He agreed on playing one more season, however, he played for two seasons and retired in the midst of the third season, he was still in form and fit to play more seasons. He scored 10 goals in all competitions in his first season after returning from retirement, with a total of almost 20 goals in all tournaments in his two and a half seasons.

In the 1980–81 season, he played immediately in the Cairo derby after his return from retirement and led his team to win Al Ahly by a score of 2–0 in the league match that took place at the Cairo Stadium. In the same season, Zamalek met El Minya SC in the league on January 26, 1981 at Cairo Stadium, and El Minya was called the “bogeyman” of Upper Egypt. They scored a goal in Zamalek, after their goal, they played a defensive match to preserve the goal. Three consecutive balls from Shehata were saved by the goalkeeper, and another shot from Shehata hit the crossbar. It was a match between Shehata and El Minya, all of Zamalek’s shots were from Hassan Shehata. He finally scored a header and equalized for his team, and even ripped his shirt off while celebrating. He was loyal to Zamalek and played for its name and for its fans.

Shehata scored 3 goals for Zamalek in the Cairo derby, however, he was famous for the goal he scored in one of the derbies in the second leg of the 1981–82 season, which was canceled as the strangest goal canceled by a player due to offside, which resulted of a 0–0 draw and losing the title to Al Ahly, the match was called the "20th century scandal". Shehata said about this incident;

"This goal was the subject of great controversy in FIFA. Three players from Al Ahly had covered the offside; Maher Hammam, Hossam El-Badry, and Magdi Abdelghani. This goal can never be forgotten".

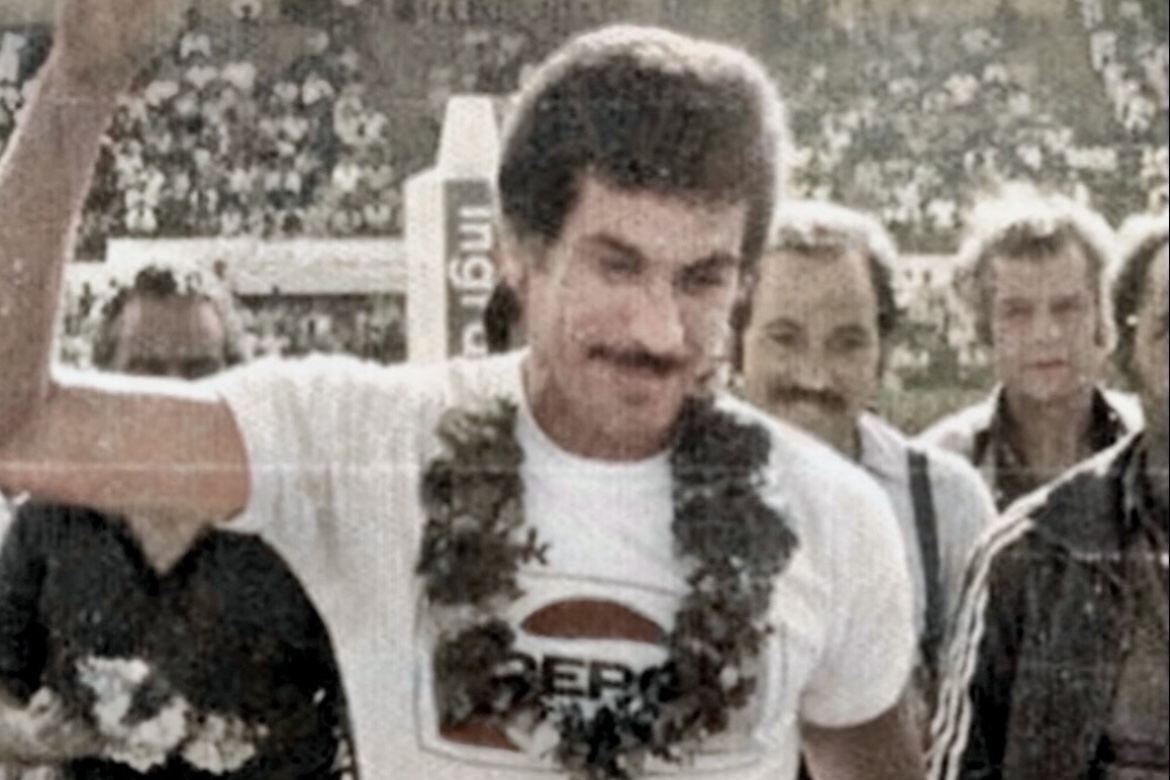
Shehata waving to fans at his retirement festival, 1983

In Africa, he was the first player to score a continental goal for Zamalek in their match against Ahly Tripoli in the 1976 African Cup Winners' Cup. He played with his team in the African Cup of Champions as well, and scored a total 6 goals in the African championships for his club. Shehata won the EFA “Best Player in Egypt” award in 1976 and was also awarded the Order of the Republic, first class in 1980 from the former Egyptian President Anwar Sadat. In 1982, Shehata decided to retire from professional football. Another festival was prepared for his retirement and it was attended by celebrities, actors, writers and thousands bidding farewell to the legendary star in the Cairo Stadium.

== International career ==
Shehata was called for the Egypt national football team for the first time in 1970, where his first international match was against Libya on 27 December 1970 in Tripoli at the Africa Cup of Nations Qualifiers in which Egypt won with a single goal scored by Hanafi Halil and assisted by Shehata. In the 1973 All-Africa Games in Lagos, Shehata scored against Nigeria in the semifinal where his country won the bronze medal after defeating Ghana in the third place playoff.

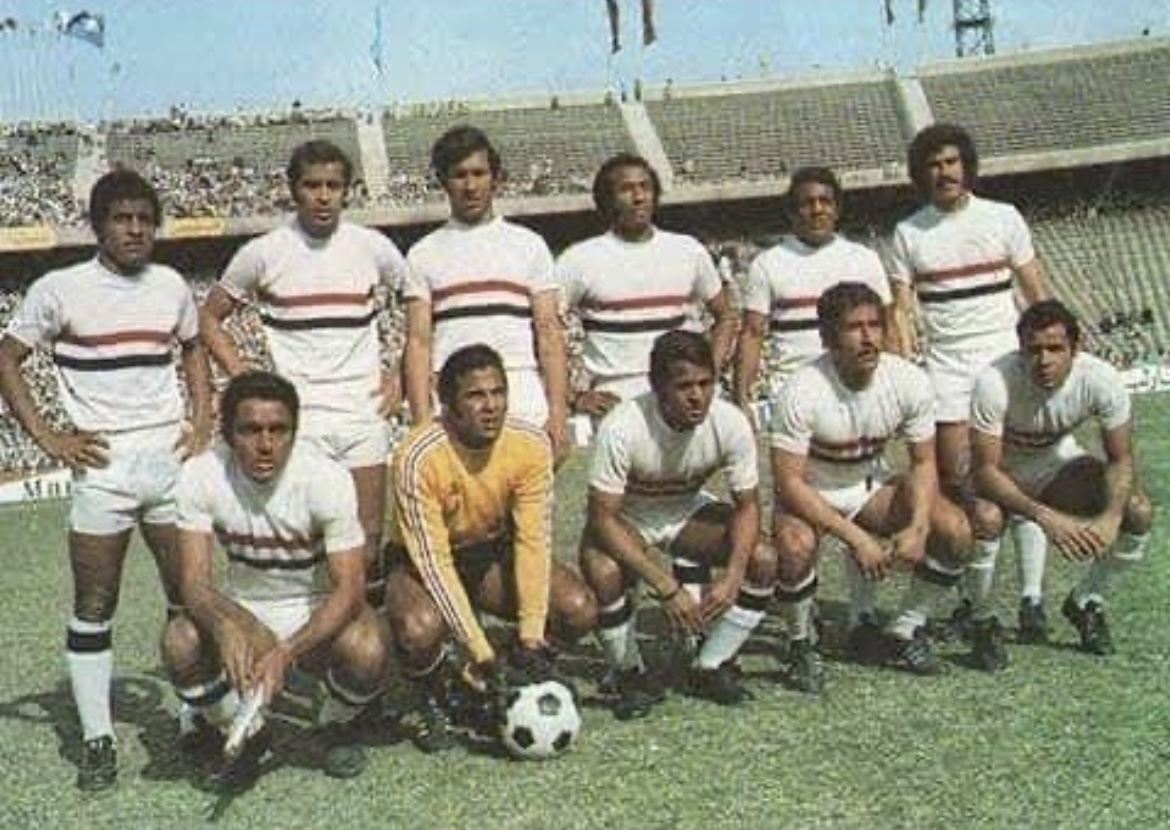
Shehata (first standing from right) with Egypt in the 1974 African Cup of Nations

In 1974, Egypt was hosting the Africa Cup of Nations, he scored twice in the third place playoff against Congo at the Cairo Stadium, and the hosts finished third in the 1974 African Cup of Nations. He won named the best midfielder, and was included in the CAF Team of the tournament. Shehata came 3rd in the African Footballer of the Year voting by France Football in 1974. In 1975, he led his country to winning the 1975 Palestine Cup of Nations for their second time. Shehata score a hat trick against Yemen in the group stage, he was the tournament's top scorer with 5 goals. Shehata led his country in the 1976 African Cup of Nations in Ethiopia, where Egypt finished fourth, after losing to Nigeria with a score of 2–3 in the third place playoff. He scored a memorable goal for the Pharaohs against Tunisia in the 1978 African Cup of Nations qualifiers match that took place on April 27, 1977 at El Menzah Stadium in Tunis.

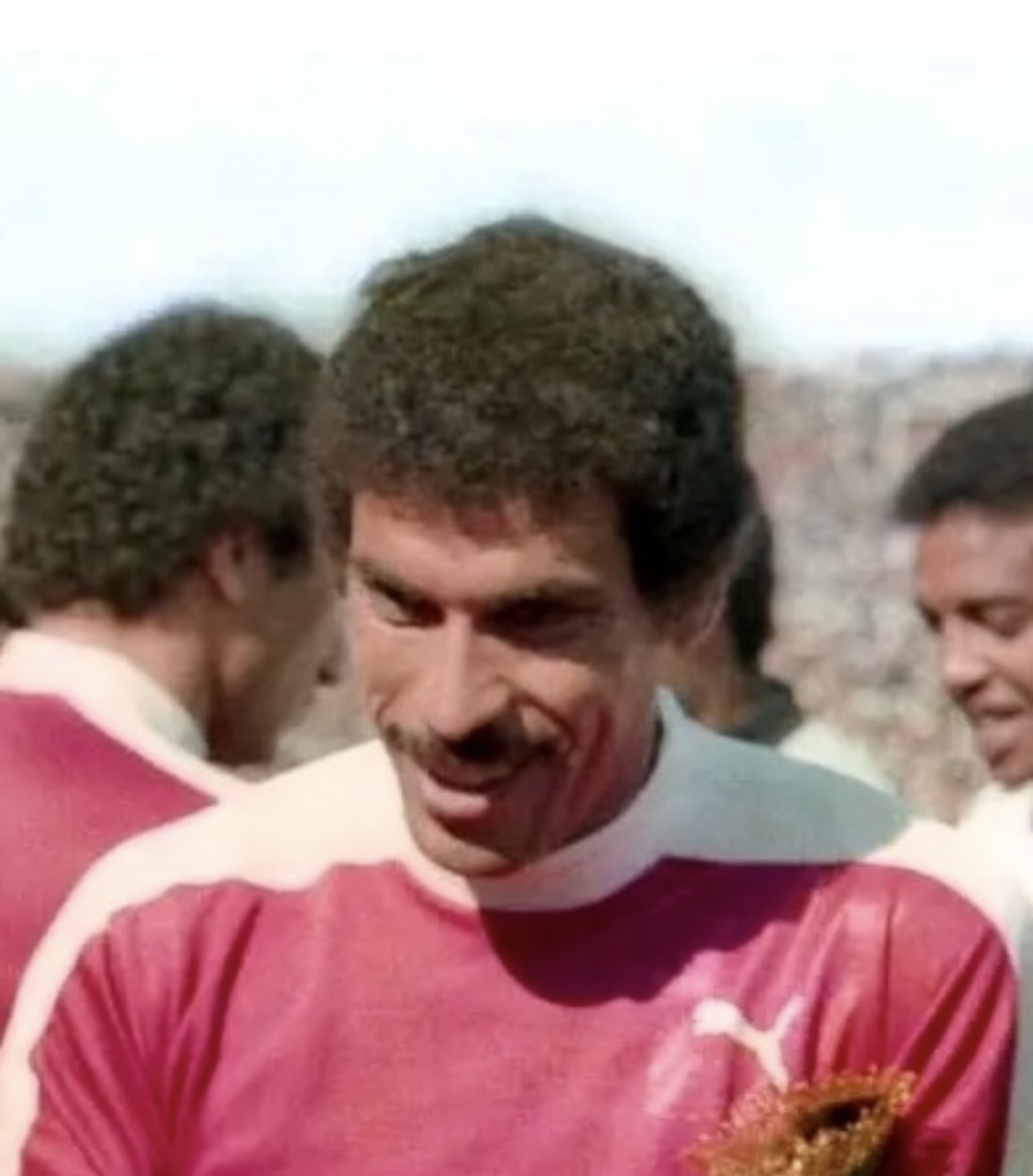
Shehata, Egypt's captain at the 1982 World Cup qualifier against Morocco in Casablanca, April 1981

In the 1980 African Cup of Nations, Shehata captained Egypt in the tournament, and scored his final international goal against Tanzania in the group stage, his country finished in the fourth place. He scored for Egypt a total of 4 goals in the Africa Cup of Nations. Shehata's last international appearance was against Morocco on 8 May 1981, in the 1982 World Cup qualifiers at Cairo Stadium. He collected 52 caps between 1970 and 1982 for the Pharaohs and scored 14 goals.

== Style of play ==
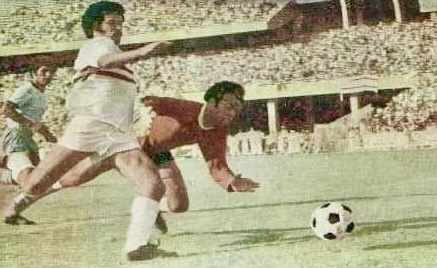
Hassan Shehata dribbling past the goalkeeper while playing for Zamalek in the Egypt Cup final, June 1975

Shehata was a regular goalscorer who was known for his ability to finish chances with either foot. He also scored a number of goals from long-range shots outside the box. He played as a forward and an attacking midfielder, he even performed his defensive duties, he was also a generous provider of assists for his teammates. He was an accurate free-kick taker, typically shooting directly on goal. Shehata's playing style which combined technical skill, dribbling, long-range shooting and stamina earned him the nickname "Master". He was a good header and his agility helped him to become a great goal scorer. Shehata was known to be a fair and highly influential player, he had a charisma and high sportsmanship. He was a prominent figure in Egypt's intellectual community, especially for his loyalty to Zamalek and Egypt, for what he represents not only as a footballer but as an Egyptian. He scored decisive goals in matches for both the national team and the club.

== Managerial career ==
Shehata started his coaching career with Zamalek immediately after retirement, he first coached the Zamalek U20 team from 1983 to 1985. Afterwards, he worked as assistant to the first team from 1985 to 1986. He traveled to Emirates and coached the Emirati side Al Wasl in 1987, he won with them the 1987–88 UAE Football League and the UAE President's Cup in 1987–88 season. Afterwards, he returned to Egypt and coached Egyptian football club El-Merrikh SC in the 1989–90 season. Shehata then had brief spells in the 1990s, helping in the promotion of El Sharkia SC, El Minya SC, and Suez SC to the Egyptian premier league. In 2003, Shehata managed Egypt national under-20 football team and won the U-20 Africa Cup of Nations and played in the 2003 FIFA World Youth Championship. He managed Al Mokawloon Al Arab SC and won the 2004 Egypt Cup and the 2004 Egyptian Super Cup, winning Al Ahly and Zamalek in the finals, respectively.

In 2004, Shehata became Egypt's national team coach after the sacking of Italian coach Marco Tardelli. In the 2006 African Cup of Nations, hosted by Egypt, he led the team to its first Cup of Nations in eight years, defeating the Ivory Coast in the final. During the 2006 African Cup semi-final against Senegal, Shehata had a serious argument with one of his players, Mido. As a result, Mido reacted negatively to being substituted. Shehata was vindicated minutes later when Amr Zaki, the player replacing Mido, scored the winning goal; which took Egypt to the final. Shehata did allow Mido to accept his medal at the closing ceremonies of the African Cup of Nations. Following the incident in a few days, Mido issued a public apology.

Shehata led Egypt to three successive titles at the African Cup of Nations in 2006, 2008 and 2010. Thus, Egypt became the first African nation to achieve such record. Consequently, the Egyptian team were ranked as high as 9th in the FIFA World Rankings. Due to his great coaching ability throughout during that period, In 2008, he was awarded the title of CAF Coach of the Year.

In 2010, FFHSI had ranked him as the best African Coach. He was also selected as one of the top five African coaches internationally. In 2011, Shehata finally coached his home club, he worked in Zamalek for one season; the 2011–12 season and finished runner up in the Egypt Cup. In 2015, he became President of the SATUC Football Cup, a new charitable global football competition for U16 orphans, refugees and disadvantaged children.

== Personal life ==
Hassan Shehata is currently married and has two children; Islam and Karim. He is a muslim and currently lives in Cairo.

== Career statistics ==
=== Club ===
Club	Season	League			National cup		Other		Continental		Total	
Club	Season	Division	Apps	Goals	Apps	Goals	Apps	Goals	Apps	Goals	Apps	Goals
Zamalek	1966–67	Egyptian Premier League		0		0			—			0
Kazma SC	1967–68	Kuwaiti Division One		6		1	—		—			7
Kazma SC	1968–69	Kuwaiti Division One		14		2	—		—			16
Kazma SC	1969–70	Kuwaiti Premier League		7		1		10 (Note: Goals in Kuwait Joint League)	—			18
Kazma SC	1970–71	Kuwaiti Premier League		9		2		6 (Note: Goals in Kuwait Joint League)	—			17
Kazma SC	1971–72	Kuwaiti Premier League		7		1		5 (Note: Goals in Kuwait Joint League)	—			13
Kazma SC	1972–73	Kuwaiti Premier League		6		0		8 (Note: Goals in Kuwait Joint League)	—			14
Kazma SC	Total			49		7		29				85
Al-Arabi (loan)	1970–71	Kuwait Premier League	0	0	0	0	—			3 (Note: Goals in AFC Champions League)		3
Zamalek	1973–74	Egyptian Premier League		0		0		9 (Note: Goals in October League Cup)	—			9
Zamalek	1974–75	Egyptian Premier League		6		4			—			10
Zamalek	1975–76	Egyptian Premier League		13		0	—			3 (Note: Goals in African Cup Winners' Cup)		16
Zamalek	1976–77	Egyptian Premier League		17		1	—		—			18
Zamalek	1977–78	Egyptian Premier League		7		1	—			1 (Note: Goals in African Cup Winners' Cup)		9
Zamalek	1978–79	Egyptian Premier League		4		1	—			2 (Note: Goals in CAF Champions League)		7
Zamalek	1979–80	Egyptian Premier League		14		1	—		—			15
Zamalek	1980–81	Egyptian Premier League		9		0	—		—			9
Zamalek	1981–82	Egyptian Premier League		5		1	—		—			6
Zamalek	1982–83	Egyptian Premier League		2		1	—		—			3
Zamalek	Total			77		10		9		6		105
Career total				126		17		38		9		190

=== International ===
Egypt
Year	Apps	Goals
1970	1	0
1971	1	0
1972	0	0
1973	0	0
1974	4	2
1975	15	8
1976	7	1
1977	12	2
1978	0	0
1979	2	0
1980	6	1
1981	4	0
Total	52	14

== Honours ==
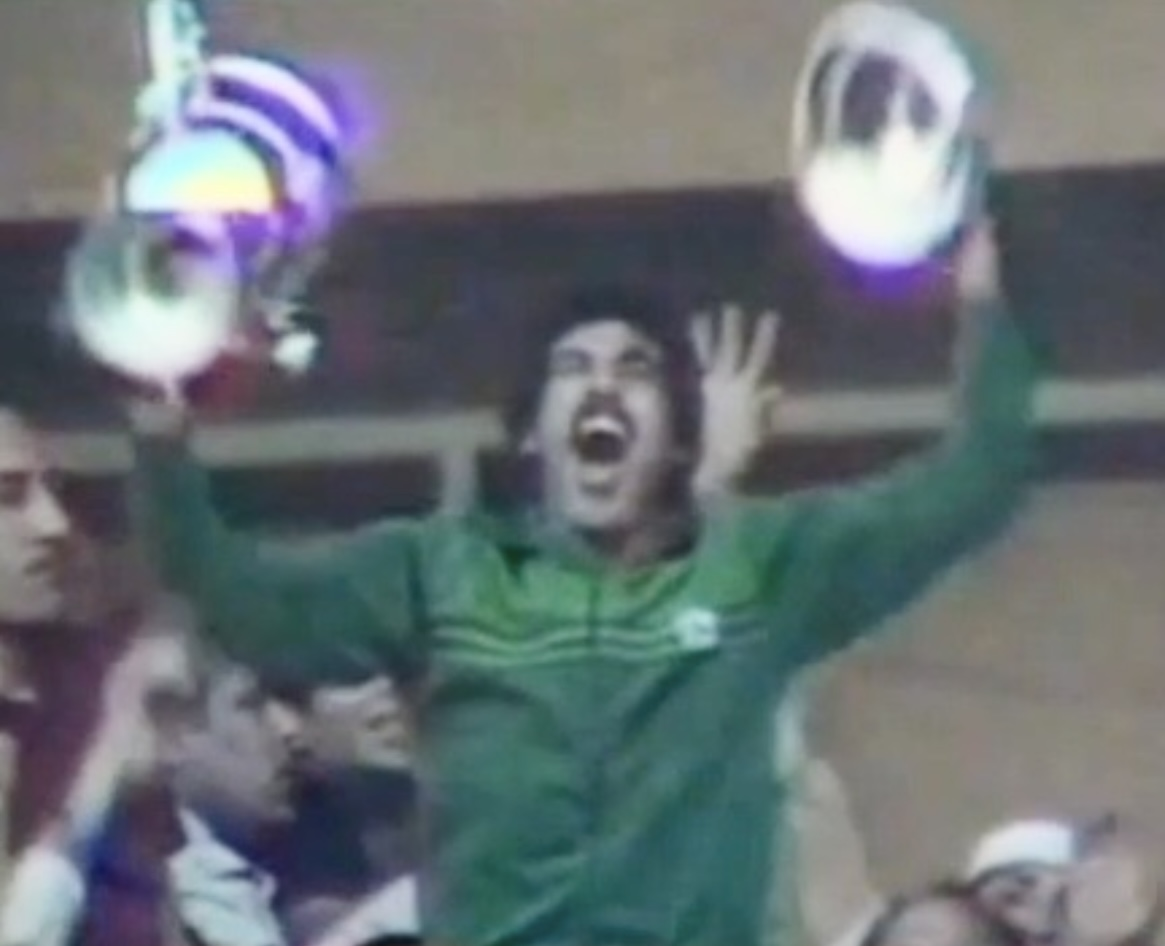
Shehata lifting the Egypt Cup trophy with Zamalek in 1979

=== Player ===
Zamalek

- Egyptian Premier League: 1977–78
- Egypt Cup: 1974–75, 1976–77, 1978–79
- October League Cup: 1974

Egypt

- Palestine Cup of Nations: 1975

Individual

- Kuwaiti Premier League top scorer: 1969–70, 1970–71, 1971–72
- Asian Footballer of the Year: 1970
- 3rd place - African footballer of the year: 1974 by France Football
- Best midfielder in 1974 African Cup of Nations
- October League Cup top scorer: 1974
- Palestine Cup of Nations top scorer: 1975
- EFA Best player in Egypt: 1976
- Egyptian Premier League top scorer: 1976-77, 1979-80

Orders

- Egypt: Order of the Republic, First Class: 1980

=== Manager ===
Al Wasl

- UAE Pro League: 1987–88
- UAE President's Cup: 1987

Suez SC

- Egyptian Second Division A: 1996-97

El Sharkia SC

- Egyptian Second Division A: 1997-98

El Minya SC

- Egyptian Second Division A: 1999-00

Al Mokawloon Al Arab SC

- Egypt Cup: 2004
- Egyptian Super Cup: 2004

Egypt U-20

- U-20 Africa Cup of Nations: 2003

Egypt

- Africa Cup of Nations: 2006, 2008, 2010
- Arab Games: 2007
- Nile Basin Tournament: 2011

Individual

- The best coach in Africa of the year by the Confederation of African Football; 2008
- The best coach in Africa of the year by International Federation of Football History and Statistics: 2010
