= 1976–77 Egyptian Premier League =

Egyptian Premier League
- Season: 1976–77
- Dates: 3 September 1976 – 6 June 1977
- Champions: Al Ahly (14th title)
- Relegated: El Sekka; Kafr El Sheikh; Aviation
- Matches played: 210
- Goals scored: 375 (1.79 per match)
- Top goalscorer: Ali Khalil; Hassan Shehata (18 goals)

The 1976–77 Egyptian Premier League, was the 20th season of the Egyptian Premier League, the top Egyptian professional league for association football clubs, since its establishment in 1948. The season started on 3 September 1976 and concluded on 6 June 1977. Al Ahly won the league for the 14th time in the club's history.

== League table ==
Pos	Club	Pld	W	D	L	F	A	Pts
1	Al Ahly (C)	28	23	4	1	48	10	50
2	Zamalek	28	18	9	1	56	13	45
3	Al Ittihad	28	14	12	2	27	16	40
4	El Mansoura	28	8	14	6	23	19	30
5	Esco	28	10	10	8	31	29	30
6	Suez	28	8	13	7	25	25	29
7	Ismaily	28	7	12	9	21	24	26
8	Tersana	28	9	8	11	22	26	26
9	Ghazl El Mahalla	28	6	13	9	20	24	25
10	El Plastic	28	7	10	11	20	32	24
11	Olympic Club	28	4	15	9	13	22	23
12	Al Masry	28	5	12	11	19	28	22
13	Kafr El Sheikh (R)	28	3	14	11	12	29	20
14	El Sekka El Hadid (R)	28	3	9	16	17	35	15
15	Aviation (R)	22	3	9	16	21	43	15

(C)= Champion, (R)= Relegated, Pld = Matches played; W = Matches won; D = Matches drawn; L = Matches lost; F = Goals for; A = Goals against; ± = Goal difference; Pts = Points.

== Top goalscorers ==
Rank	Player	Club	Goals
1	(Egypt) Ali Khalil	Zamalek	18
1	(Egypt) Hassan Shehata	Zamalek	18
3	(Egypt) Hamdi Nouh	Esco	14
4	(Egypt) Mahmoud El Khatib	Al Ahly	10
5	(Egypt) Mohamed El-Bably	El Mansoura	9

== Teams location ==
Team	Home city
Al Ahly	Cairo
Aviation	Cairo
Al Masry	Port Said
Al Ittihad	Alexandria
El Sekka El Hadid	Cairo
Esco	Cairo
El Plastic	Cairo
El Mansoura	Mansoura
Ghazl El Mahalla	El Mahalla
Ismaily	Ismailia
Kafr El Sheikh	Kafr El Sheikh
Olympic	Alexandria
Suez	Suez
Tersana	Giza
Zamalek	Giza
