= 1979 Egypt Cup final =

- Event: 1978–79 Egypt Cup
Zamalek	Ghazl El Mahalla
3	0
- Date: 27 April 1979

1979 Egypt Cup final, was the final match of the 1978–79 Egypt Cup, was between Zamalek and Ghazl El Mahalla, Zamalek won the match 3–0.

== Match details ==
27 April 1979

Zamalek	3 – 0	Ghazl El Mahalla
Khalil 15'; Kamel 43'; Gaafar 63' (.pen)	Report

Zamalek:
GK	(Egypt) Adel El-Maamour
RB	(Egypt) Sami Mansour
CB	(Egypt) Mahmoud Saad
CB	(Egypt) Ibrahim Youssef
LB	(Egypt) Sabri El-Meniawi
CM	(Egypt) Tarek Ghonaim	(substituted off) ?'
CM	(Egypt) Farouk Gaafar
RW	(Egypt) Magdi Shalaby	(substituted off) ?'
AM	(Egypt) Wahid Kamel
FW	(Egypt) Ali Khalil
FW	(Egypt) Mahmoud El-Khawaga
Substitutions:
DF	(Egypt) Mohamed Taher	(substituted in) ?'
MF	(Egypt) Mohamed Abdullah "Hamama"	(substituted in) ?'
Manager:

Ghazl El Mahalla:
GK	(Egypt) El-Balouty
RB	(Egypt) Khaled Karam
CB	(Egypt) El-Said Abdel Gawwad
CB	(Egypt) Mohamed El-Gamil
LB	(Egypt) Sukkar
CM	(Egypt) Shawki Ghareeb
CM	(Egypt) Lotfi El-Shennawi
RW	(Egypt) Kamal Abdel Khalek	(substituted off) ?'
AM	(Egypt) Omar Abdullah	(substituted off) ?'
LW	(Egypt) Nabil Kharoub
CF	(Egypt) Ahmed Hassan
Substitutions:
MF	(Egypt) Abdel Rehim Khalil	(substituted in) ?'
FW	(Egypt) Hossam Abdel Ghani	(substituted in) ?'
Manager:
