= Hamdi Nouh =

Egyptian football manager (born 1954)

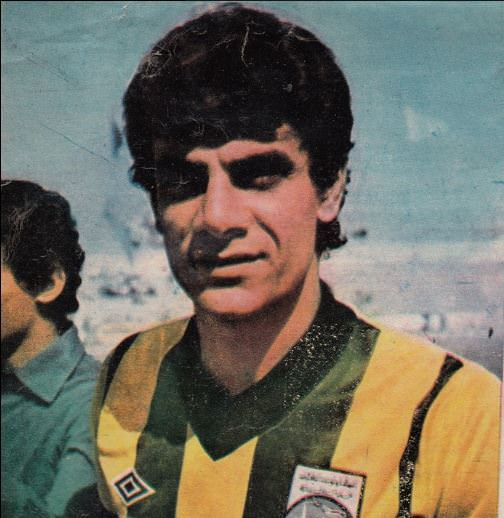

Personal information
- Full name: Hamdi Hussein Mohamed Ibrahim Nouh
- Date of birth: 23 February 1955 (age 71)

Senior career*
Years	Team	Apps	(Gls)
1971–1978	Esco		
1978–1983	Al Mokawloon Al Arab SC		
1983–1989	Ismaily SC		

International career
1978–1984	Egypt		

Managerial career
- 2013: Al Mokawloon (assistant)
- 2013: Al Mokawloon
- * Club domestic league appearances and goals

Hamdi Hussein Mohamed Ibrahim Nouh (Egyptian Arabic: حمدى حسين محمد إبراهيم نوح; born 23 February 1955) is an Egyptian former football manager and player. In his youth, he was discovered by former Zamalek SC player Ibrahim Aziz and began his professional football career at ESCO Club in Shubra, Cairo in 1971.

As a player for Al Mokawloon Al Arab SC, he won the 1982 African Cup Winners' Cup and the Egyptian Premier League in 1983. He was a member of the Egypt national football team from 1978 to 1983 under Taha Ismail. Since retiring from professional football in 1987, he has discovered and developed talented players such as young Mohamed Salah. His career as a manager has included stints at Al Jazira Club in the United Arab Emirates and at Al Ain FC for nine years. He won seven different championships as a manager.
