= Ali Khalil =

Egyptian footballer (born 1952)

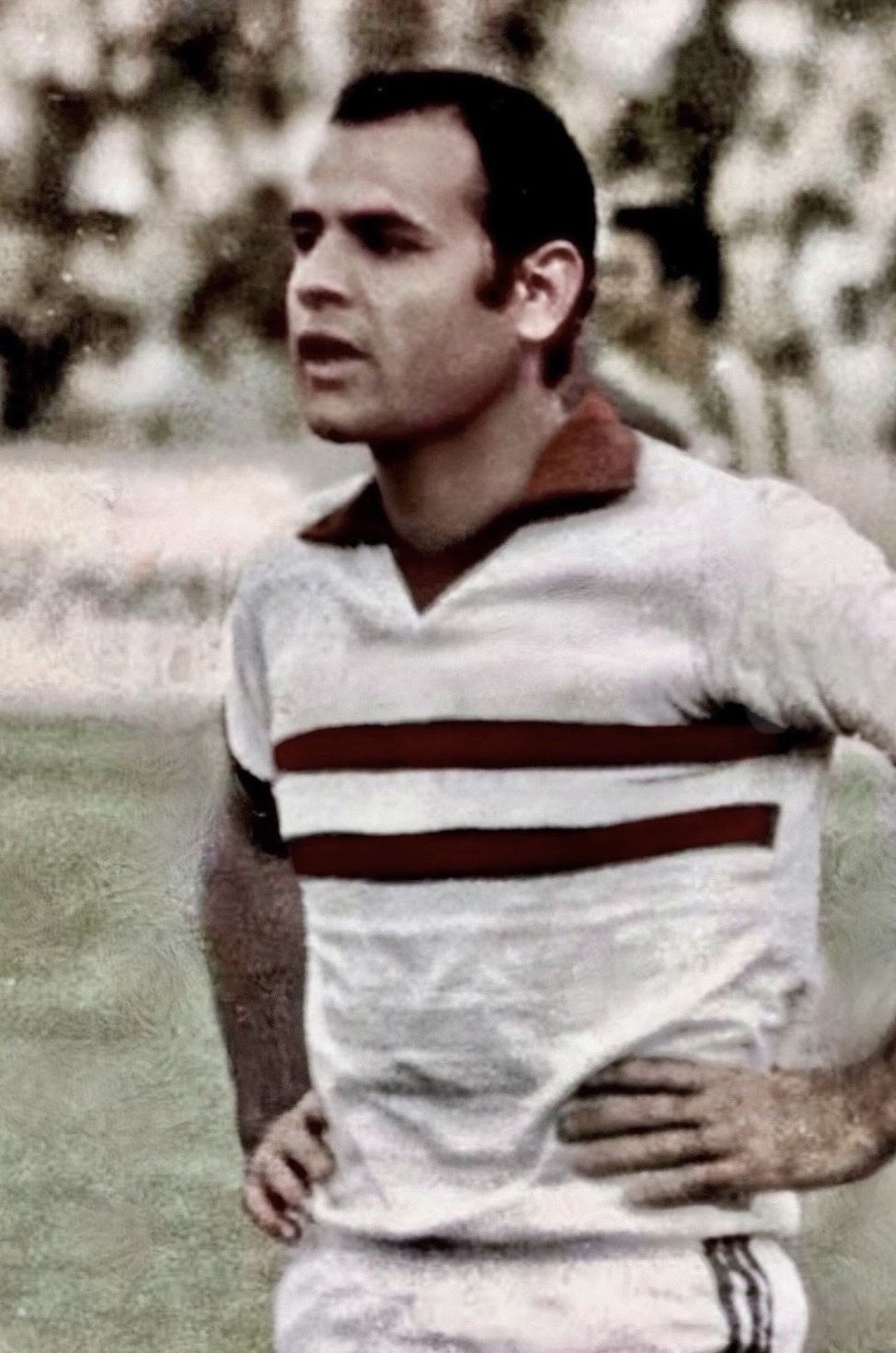
- Khalil with Zamalek in 1978

Personal information
- Date of birth: 28 November 1952
- Place of birth: Beni Suef, Egypt
- Position: Striker

Youth career
- 1964–1969: Beni Suef SC
- 1969–1971: Zamalek

Senior career*
Years	Team	Apps	(Gls)
1971–1980	Zamalek	111	(78)

International career
1970–1980	Egypt	33	(23)
Medal record
Men's football
Representing Egypt
African Games
Bronze medal – third place	1973
Africa Cup of Nations
Third place	1974
- * Club domestic league appearances and goals

Ali Khalil (Arabic: على خليل; born 28 November 1952) is an Egyptian football coach and a former professional footballer who played as a striker. He was one of the most iconic Egyptian football players in the 1970s and one of its greatest strikers. Khalil spent his entire football career with Zamalek. Nicknamed "Dangerous Ali", he was the Egyptian Premier League's top scorer for two times in the 1976–77 and 1978–79 seasons. He represented Egypt in three Africa Cup of Nations tournaments.

A prolific goal scorer, he played for his country a total of 33 international matches, scoring 23 goals. Despite his relatively short career, retiring at 28, Khalil still maintains his popularity despite his absence from his country over the past decades. After retirement from professional football in 1980, he moved to the Gulf Area and coached youth football teams. He is now a global expert in the field of training youth players.

== Early life ==
Ali Khalil was born on 28 November 1952 in Beni Suef, Egypt. He started playing football at his home town with Beni Suef SC youth teams. He played in the U-14 team and continued with the club until he was in the U-18 team.

== Club career ==
In 1969, Khalil was chosen to move to Zamalek by Helmy Hussein, who was Zamalek's U-18 coach. Khalil was soon selected to play with the Zamalek U-20 team in the Youth League, which was a tournament that received great media coverage at the time for the cessation of football activity in Egypt due to the War of Attrition. In the final match against Al Ahly, which was broadcast on television, Ali Khalil scored both goals for his team, and Zamalek won 2–1, and after that match, Khalil became a rising star in Egyptian football.

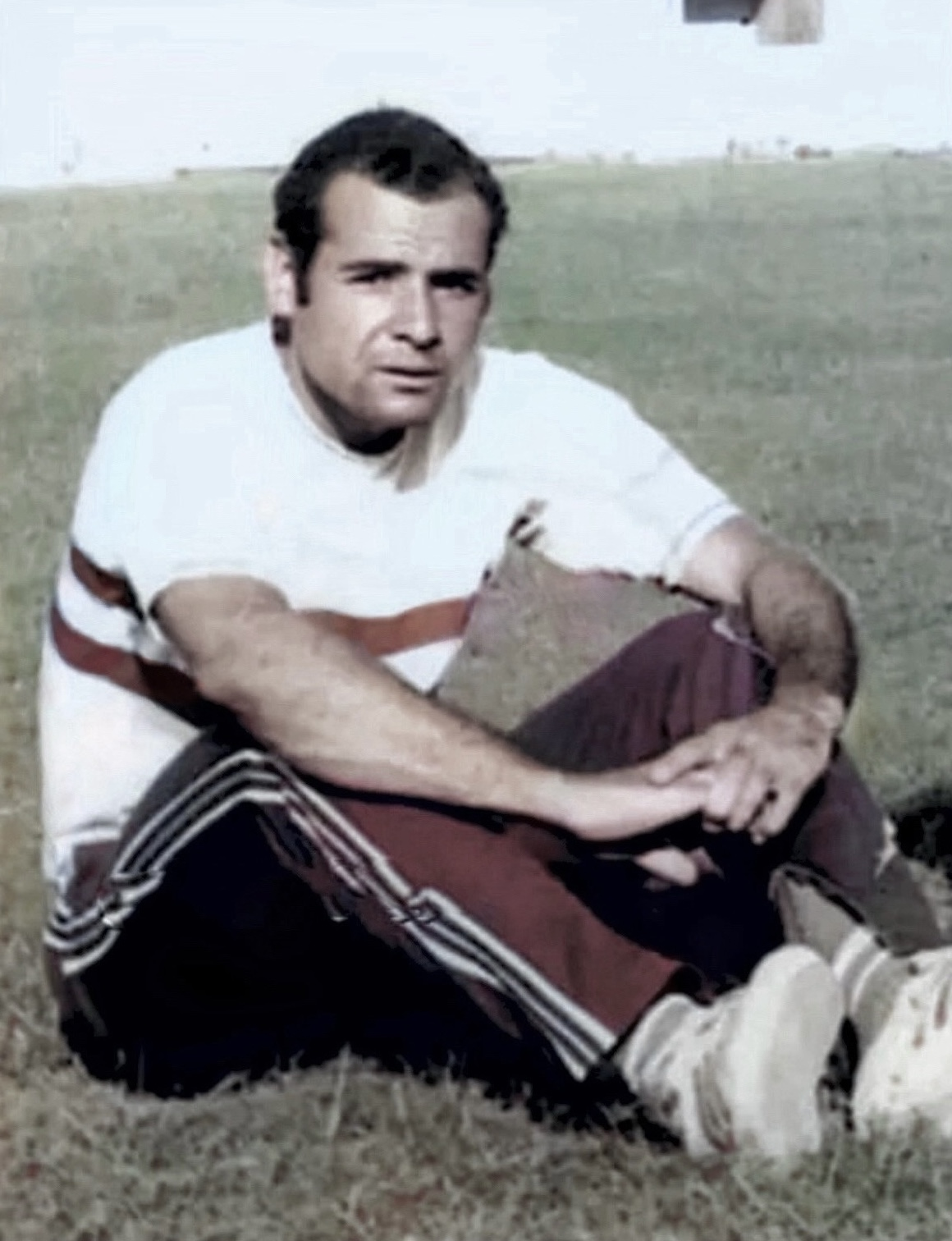
Khalil with Zamalek in 1976

Khalil played for the first team in 1971, he won with Zamalek the October League Cup title in the 1973–74 season. He also won with his team the 1977–78 Egyptian League title, and three titles of the Egypt Cup, the first title was in 1975, and in the 1977 Egypt Cup, he scored twice in the 3–1 win over Ismaily in the final, and scored a goal in the 1979 Egypt Cup final where Zamalek won Ghazl El Mahlalla by a score of 3–0. Khalil played eight league seasons with Zamalek and scored 78 goals for his team. In his nine-seasons career, he scored a total of 94 goals for Zamalek in all competitions. Besides being a fierce goal scorer, Khalil was known for his extreme honesty and integrity, he had a famous incident in the 1978–79 league season, where he scored a goal which passed through the outer torn net and landed in the goal against Ismaily. This goal was a deciding factor in the title, but despite this he told referee of the match, Ahmed Bilal, that the ball was not a goal. As a result, the goal was canceled after it had been awarded, amid major objections from the Ismaily players and fans.

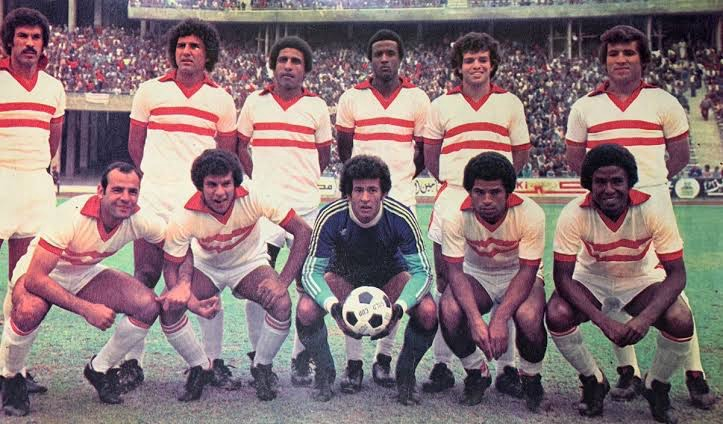
Khalil (front row, first from left) with Zamalek in 1978

Khalil was Zamalek's valuable striker of the 1970s and the beloved player of its fans. He scored decisive goals for Zamalek which earned him nickname of "Dangerous Ali". He was the Egyptian Premier League top scorer in 1976-77 and 1978–79. In 1980, at the height of his career, Khalil, who was 28 at the time, retired from football and became a youth coach.

== International career ==
In 1970, Khalil played for the Egypt national team before playing in Zamalek's first team, as the national team was training in Zamalek Stadium. Khalil was staying at the time in a room under the stands, along with Mussad Nour. Khalil stood watching the training and the coach chose him to complete the division. After playing, he was officially called to the national team. Afterwards, he was called to be a part of the team that played in the 1971 Mediterranean Games in Izmir, where Egypt finished fourth.

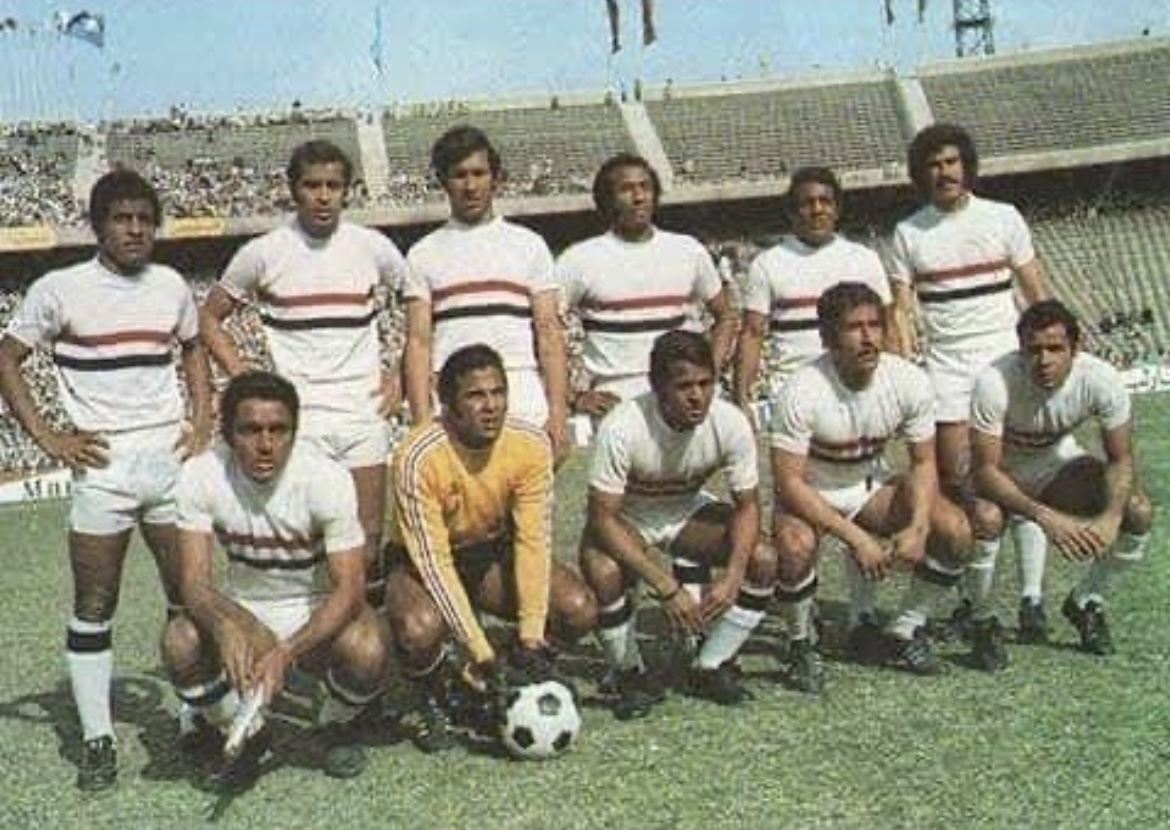
Khalil (front row, first from right) with Egypt in the 1974 African Cup of Nations in Egypt

His first appearance with his country was in a game that took place in Cairo Stadium on December 1, 1972, against Kenya at the 1973 African Games qualifiers, which Egypt won 1–0. He scored his first international goal on December 8, 1972, against Tunisia in Cairo at the 1974 World Cup Qualifiers. He also played in the 1972 Palestine Cup of Nations, and scored two goals in the group stage, and Egypt finished as champions.

He was a part of the team that participated in the 1973 All-Africa Games in Nigeria and he scored against Guinea and Upper Volta in the group stage. Egypt won the bronze medal. Khalil played in the 1974 African Cup of Nation in Egypt, where he scored the winning goal against Uganda in the group stage, and also the second goal against Ivory Coast in the group stage. The Egyptians finished 3rd. He also was a part of the team that won the 1975 Palestine Cup of Nations. Khalil's final international match was on April 13, 1980, in the 1980 Summer Olympics Qualifiers against Zambia at the Independence Stadium in Lusaka, which finished in a 1–1 draw, and Khalil scored Egypt's goal. He played 33 caps for his country and scored 23 goals.

== Career statistics ==
Egypt
Year	Apps	Goals
1970	0	0
1971	0	0
1972	3	1
1973	7	5
1974	7	9
1975	8	3
1976	0	0
1977	6	4
1978	0	0
1979	1	0
1980	1	1
Total	33	23

== Honours ==
=== Player ===
Zamalek

- Egyptian Premier League: 1977–78
- Egypt Cup: 1974–75, 1976–77, 1978–79
- October League Cup: 1974

Egypt

- Palestine Cup of Nations: 1972, 1975

Individual

- Egyptian Premier League top scorer : 1976–77, 1978–79
