= Sami Mansour =

Egyptian basketball player

Personal information
- Full name: Sami Ibrahim Mansour
- Nationality: Egyptian
- Born: 20 May 1926

Sport
- Sport: Basketball

Sami Ibrahim Mansour (Arabic: سامي إبراهيم منصور; born 20 May 1926) was an Egyptian basketball player. He competed in the men's tournament at the 1952 Summer Olympics.
