= October League Cup =

- Organiser(s): Ministry of Youth and Sport; Egyptian Football Association
- Founded: 1974
- Region: Egypt
- Domestic cups: Egyptian Premier League; Egypt Cup
- Most championships: Zamalek (1 title)

The October Cup or October League is a one-time football tournament in Egypt that was held in 1974 instead of the canceled Egyptian League. The Egyptian League was canceled as a result of the October War and also as Egypt was hosting the 1974 African Cup of Nations. The only champion was Zamalek.

== Conditions for organizing the tournament ==
After the outbreak of the October War on the sixth of October 1973, the 1973-74 Egyptian Premier League was suspended after only playing 5 rounds, and in the first half of 1974 an alternative Egyptian football tournament was organized under the name of the October Cup.

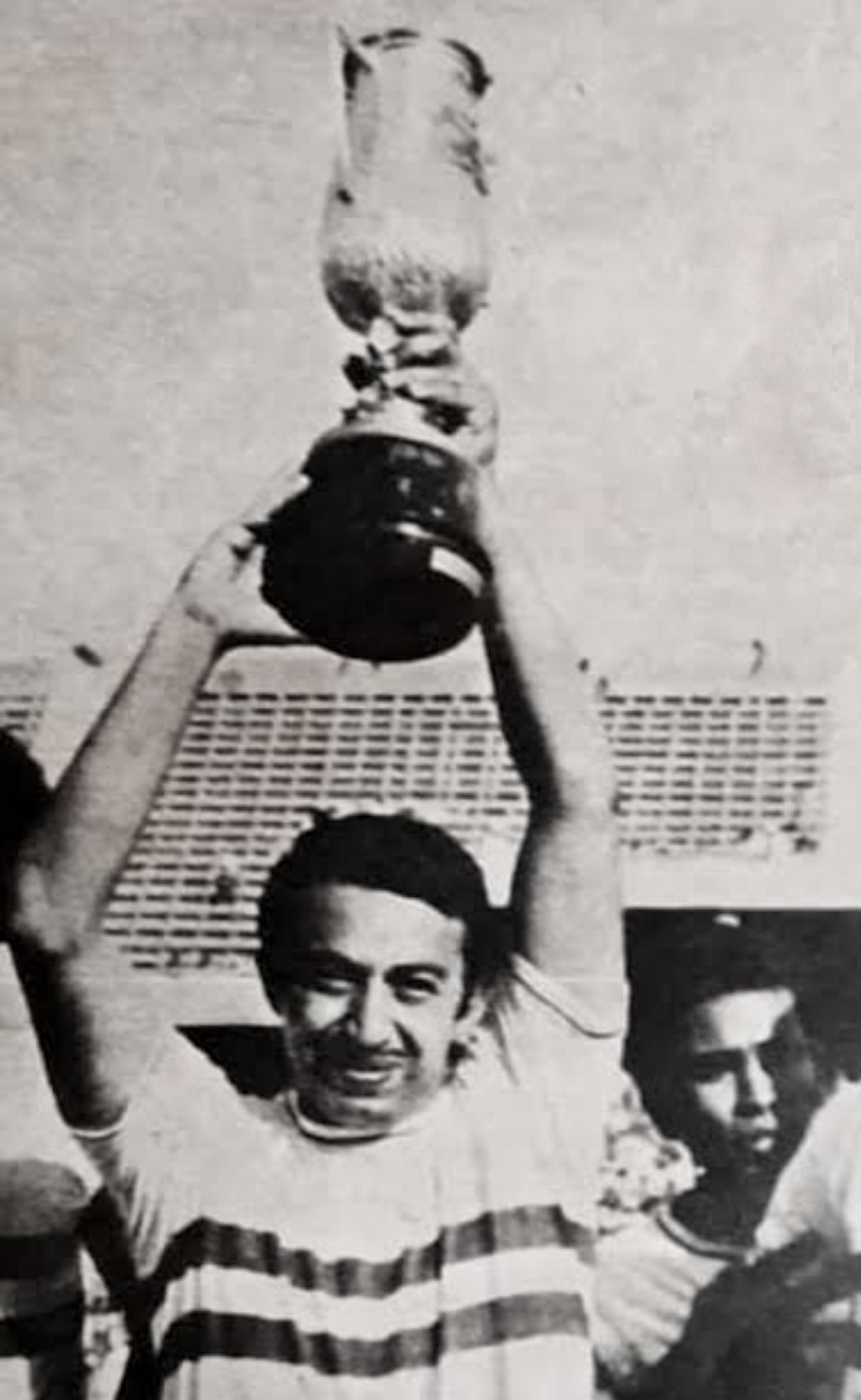
Zamalek's captain Hamada Emam lifting the trophy

The October Cup was a single round-robin tournament, the clubs were divided into two groups, and the top two clubs of each group qualified for the championship stage, which included the clubs of Zamalek, Al-Ittihad and Tersana. Ghazl El Mahalla also qualified but later withdrew due to the club's participation in the African Champions League, Zamalek ranked first in the final stage, and won the tournament after phenomenal performance from Hassan Shehata.

== Top scorers ==
Rank	Player	Club	Goals
1	(Egypt) Hassan Shehata	Zamalek	9

== See also ==
- Football in Egypt
