= Association football in Africa =

Football in Africa
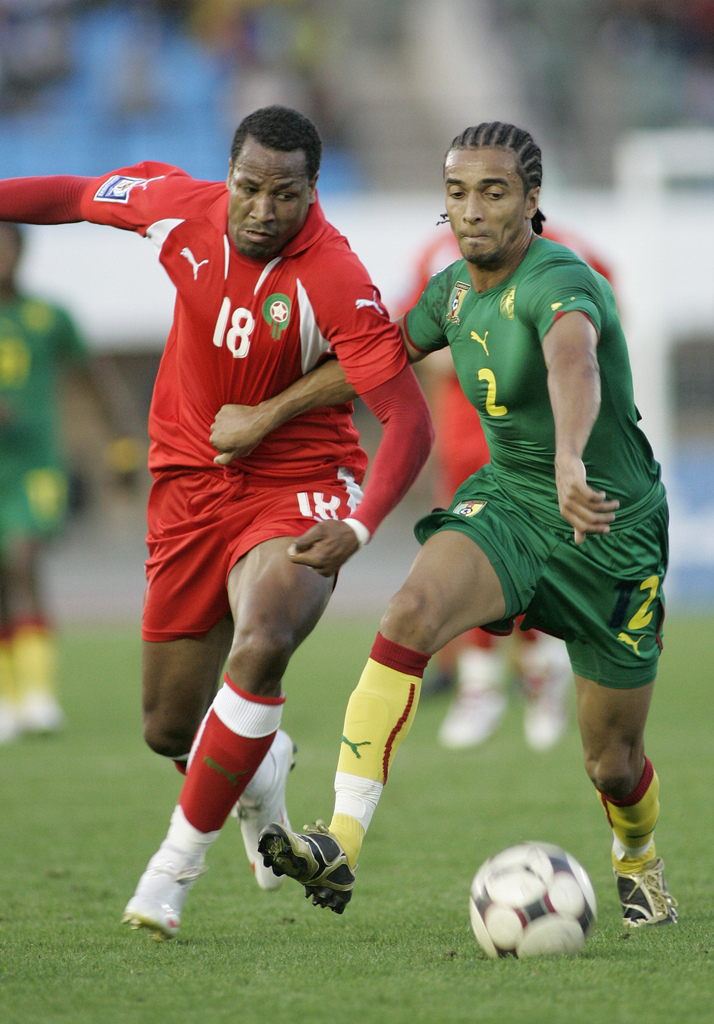
- Cameroon's Benoît Assou-Ekotto jostles for possession with Mustapha Allaoui of Morocco
- Governing body: Confederation of African Football
- First played: 1860

International competitions
- Africa Cup of Nations (National Team); African Nations Championship (National Team); FIFA World Cup (National Team); Champions League; CAF Confederation Cup; Super Cup; FIFA Club World Cup

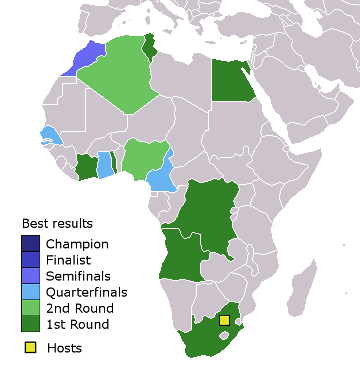
Best results of African men's national teams at the FIFA World Cup

Football is the most popular sport in Africa, alongside basketball. Indeed, football is probably the most popular sport in almost every African country, although rugby union and cricket are also very popular in South Africa. The first football stadium to be built in Africa was the Alexandria Stadium in 1929.

The English Premier League is the most popular sports league in Africa. The most popular clubs in Africa are Arsenal, Chelsea and Manchester United.

== History ==
Football was first introduced to Africa in the early 1860s by Europeans, due to the colonisation of Africa. The first recorded games were played in South Africa in 1862 between soldiers and civil servants and there were no established rules for the game at this time;" Initially, there were various forms of playing the game, which included elements of both rugby and soccer. It was not until October 26, 1863 that the "rules of association football were codified." The first official football organization in Africa, Pietermaritzburg County Football Association, was established in 1880.Teams were being established in South Africa before 1900, Egypt and in Algeria during a similar time period. Savages FC (Pietermaritzburg, South Africa), L'Oranaise Club (Oran, Algeria) and Gezira SC (Alexandria, Egypt) are the oldest African football clubs that remain in existence. The tree clubs began play in 1882, followed by Alexandria SC (1890), CDJ Oran from Algeria in 1894 and CAL Oran from Algeria too in 1897. By the 1930s, football was being played in Central Africa. In 1882, the first national governing body on the continent was formed, South African Football Association (SAFA). SAFA was a whites-only association that became the first member of FIFA in South Africa in 1910.

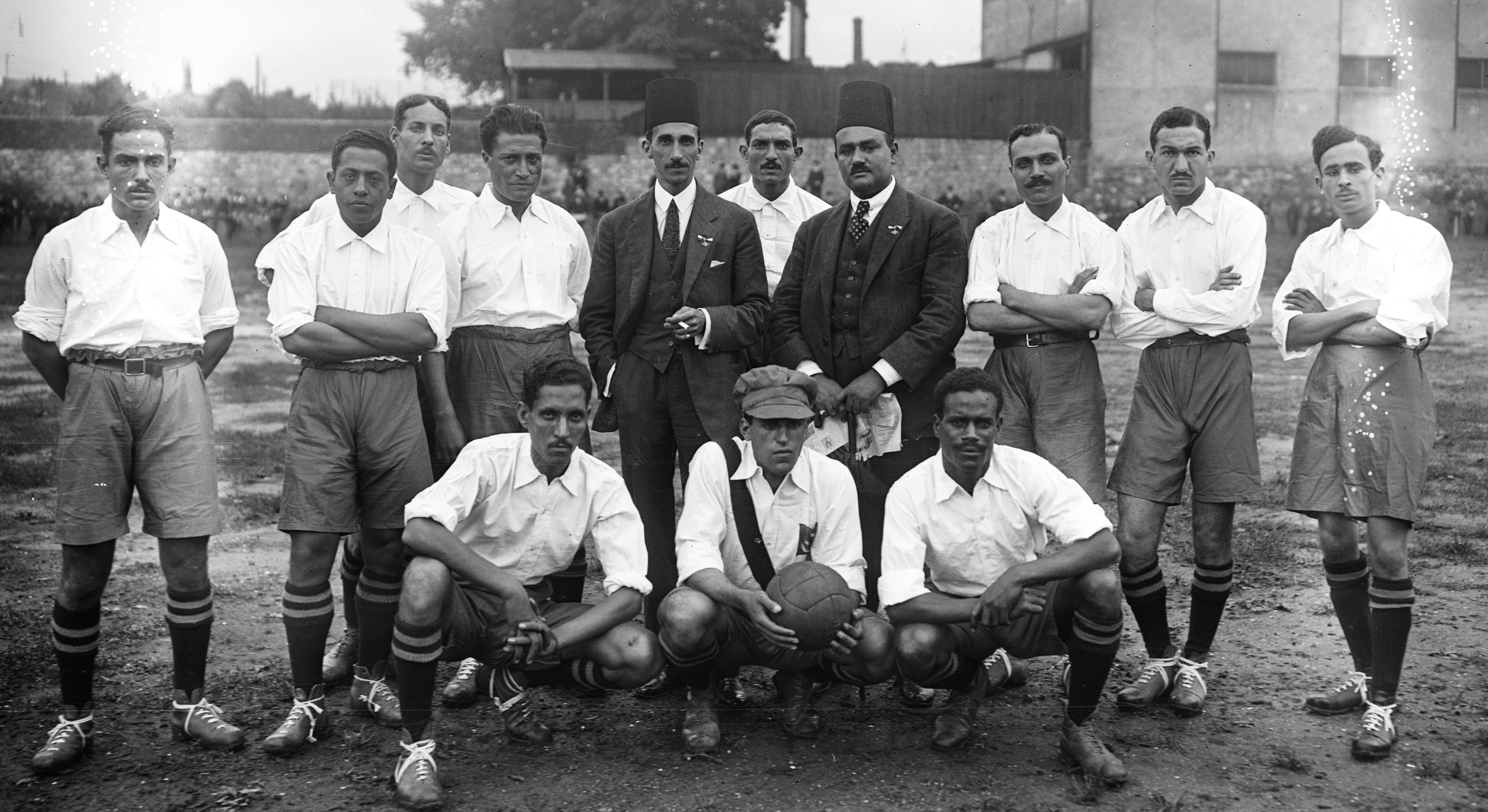
Egypt's national team at the 1920 Summer Olympics

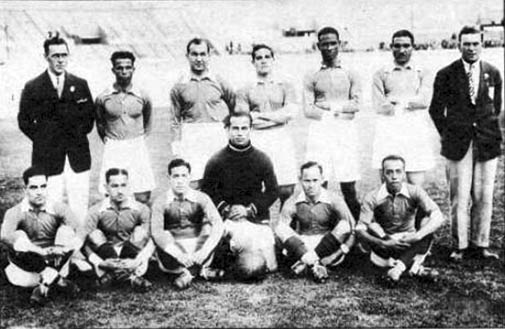
Egypt's national team at the 1928 Summer Olympics

Many African teams depend on witch doctors for success. Activities that witch doctors have performed for teams include cutting players, placing potions on equipment, and sacrificing animals.

Children are also often exploited by agents in cases of football trafficking. Other issues faced in African football include a lack of organization by national team officials, and internal disputes between players and federation officials. Football in Africa witnessed a great development in the last stage, which gained international fame, after the honor and representation of the honorable Congolese team TP Mazembe in the 2010 FIFA Club World Cup, the FIFA international tournament hosted by United Arab Emirates when TP Mazembe reached the final match against the Italian club Inter Milan. And Moroccan team Raja in the 2013 FIFA Club World Cup, the tournament hosted by Morocco when Raja reached the final match against the German club Bayern Munich.

In the 1990s, football in Africa experienced huge waves of change. One big change was the football migration to Europe. Many talented young players sought big careers in Europe and shot for their chance to make it big. Peter Alegi mentions the story of two in particular: Michael Essien who ended up making millions, and Albert Youmba who ended up failing. He states, "Penniless, homeless, and without a work permit, the young Cameroonian chose the life of an illegal immigrant rather than face potential embarrassment and shame if he went home.". The hardships that Youmba faced versus the amount of success that Essien was met with showed the largely different experiences that a young African footballer would have to be prepared to face if they migrated.

== Changes ==
The Confederation of African Football (CAF) was founded in 1957, Sudan was the founder of African football by creating CAF with four member nations: Egypt, Ethiopia, South Africa, and Sudan. The first Africa Cup of Nations was held the same year, with a three-team field. Egypt won the inaugural African Cup of Nations, defeating Ethiopia 4–0 in the final. As the sport grew football associations grew across the continent. Qualification rounds were added for the 1962 event. African national teams compete in the Africa Cup of Nations and also in the African Nations Championship for local teams.

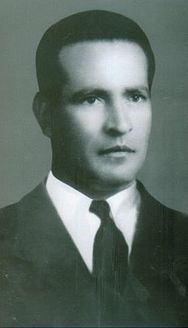
Abdulrahman Fawzi, the first Egyptian to score in the World Cup, Egypt's top scorer in 1934 FIFA World Cup

The first African nation to participate in the FIFA World Cup was Egypt in 1934. That remained the only World Cup appearance by a team from the continent until 1966, when a team from CAF was originally scheduled to compete in a playoff with teams from Asia and Oceania for one tournament berth. In response, CAF nations boycotted World Cup qualifying, and FIFA granted CAF one guaranteed berth in the 1970 tournament. Starting in 1970, African nations at the FIFA World Cup started to compete regularly. Zaire was Africa's representative at the 1974 edition of the competition. The team lost all three of its games. In 1977, Pelé stated his belief that a team from the continent would be crowned World Cup champions by the end of the 20th century, which proved incorrect.

After the 1970, 1974, and 1978 World Cups, which each had one African qualifier, there were two teams from the continent in 1982: Algeria and Cameroon, each of which missed out on advancing from the group stage on goal difference. The 1986 and 1990 World Cups also featured two African nations; Morocco reached the round of 16 in 1986 after finishing first in their group. Cameroon advanced to the quarterfinals of the 1990 World Cup, becoming the first African national team to do so. Senegal and Ghana matched the feat, in 2002 and 2010 respectively. By 2010 South Africa become the first African nation to host the World Cup.

== Women's football ==
In Africa, football was viewed as "hypermasculine" and the continent as a whole was not very supportive of women playing. Numerous Nigerian cities hosted women's football teams by 1960. Multiple efforts were made in the 1960s to start women's football clubs in South Africa, but they proved fleeting. The 1970s saw some growth, with new women's leagues in Nigeria and an expansion of women's football into Western African countries, including Senegal. One local club in Dakar played a match against an Italian club in 1974; five years later, an early match between African nations was played by the Dakar side and a team from Guinea. Until the 1990s, governments, businesses, and football associations dominated by men did not support women's football in Africa.

Despite a lack of support from Nigerian officials, 28 clubs played women's football in the country by 1989, and Nigeria's national team competed in the 1991 Women's World Cup.The South African Women's Football Association (SAWFA) was created around this time to govern women's football, but it was not racially integrated for years to come. More women began playing football in the 1990s, in countries like Nigeria and South Africa. In 1998, CAF introduced an official African Women's Championship, following two unofficial versions of the tournament earlier in the 1990s; host country Nigeria won, beginning a stretch of five consecutive titles in the event. The next year, the squad reached the quarterfinals of the 1999 Women's World Cup.

Football is played in a limited capacity by women due to a lack of funding.

== Premier League in Africa ==
A number of African players have played in the Premier League, the highest division of football in England and the most popular sports league in the world. Due to this, the Premier League is very popular in Africa.

A 2024 NOI Polls poll in Nigeria found that most Nigerians watch the national team and the Premier League. 59% of respondents watched the Premier League, while only 34% watched the Nigerian Premier League, Nigeria's top division. The poll found that Chelsea was the most supported club in Nigeria, with 28% of respondents listing them as their favourite club, followed by Manchester United (23%), Arsenal (22%), Manchester City (7%), Liverpool (6%) and Tottenham Hotspur (1%).

=== Most popular clubs ===
2015 Twitter research (BBC)
Country	Favourite club			
Country	Arsenal	Chelsea	Man City	Man Utd
Algeria	43%	19%	11%	—N/a
Egypt	17%	26%	—N/a	18%
Ethiopia	52%	8%	—N/a	22%
Ghana	15%	26%	—N/a	18%
Ivory Coast	23%	35%	—N/a	15%
Kenya	31%	17%	—N/a	23%
Malawi	29%	16%	—N/a	26%
Morocco	55%	14%	10%	—N/a
Nigeria	26%	25%	—N/a	18%
Senegal	15%	26%	—N/a	22%
South Africa	21%	18%	—N/a	23%
Tanzania	22%	17%	—N/a	25%
Tunisia	33%	22%	13%	—N/a
Uganda	36%	12%	—N/a	23%
Zambia	27%	18%	—N/a	30%
Zimbabwe	17%	19%	—N/a	28%

== Attendances ==
The CAF clubs with an average home league attendance of at least 20,000 in the 2024-25 and 2025 seasons:

#	Club	Country	Average
1	MC Alger	Algeria	40,742
2	JS Kabylie	Algeria	31,158
3	Wydad	Morocco	23,880
4	Kaizer Chiefs	South Africa	22,172
5	Raja	Morocco	22,120
6	Asante Kotoko	Ghana	20,381

Sources: League pages on Wikipedia
