= 1978–79 Egyptian Premier League =

Egyptian Premier League
- Season: 1978–79
- Dates: 13 October 1978 – 6 April 1979
- Champions: Al Ahly (15th title)
- Relegated: Relegation was cancelled
- Matches played: 132
- Goals scored: 224 (1.7 per match)
- Top goalscorer: Ali Khalil (12 goals)

The 1978–79 Egyptian Premier League, was the 22nd season of the Egyptian Premier League, the top Egyptian professional league for association football clubs, since its establishment in 1948. The season started on 13 October 1978 and concluded on 6 April 1979. Al Ahly won the league for the 15th time in the club's history.

== League table ==
Pos	Club	Pld	W	D	L	F	A	Pts
1	Al Ahly (C)	22	14	8	0	36	7	36
2	Zamalek	22	10	9	3	33	16	29
3	Ghazl El Mahalla	22	8	9	5	17	14	25
4	Al Mokawloon	22	6	12	4	19	18	24
5	El Mansoura	22	6	9	7	13	13	21
6	Al Masry	22	6	9	7	22	23	21
7	Al Ittihad	22	6	9	7	14	16	21
8	Tersana	22	7	7	8	11	19	21
9	Suez	22	6	8	8	16	20	20
10	Ismaily	22	7	5	10	21	23	19
11	Olympic Club (R)	22	5	9	8	14	17	18
12	Damanhour (R)	22	1	6	15	8	38	8

(C)= Champion, (R)= Relegated, Pld = Matches played; W = Matches won; D = Matches drawn; L = Matches lost; F = Goals for; A = Goals against; ± = Goal difference; Pts = Points.

== Top goalscorers ==
Rank	Player	Club	Goals
1	(Egypt) Ali Khalil	Zamalek	12
2	(Egypt) Mussad Nur	Al Masry	10
3	(Egypt) Ossama Khalil	Ismaily	9
4	(Egypt) Ali Abo Gresha	Ismaily	7
5	(Egypt) Gamal Abdel-Hamid	Al Ahly	7

== Teams ==
Team	Home city
Al Ahly	Cairo
Al Ittihad	Alexandria
Al Masry	Port Said
Al Mokawloon	Cairo
Damanhour	Damanhur
El Mansoura	Mansoura
Ghazl El Mahalla	El Mahalla
Ismaily	Ismailia
Olympic	Alexandria
Suez	Suez
Tersana	Giza
Zamalek	Giza

=== Teams location ===
Locations of the 1978–79 Egyptian Premier League teams
