= List of Zamalek SC managers =

Zamalek Sporting Club (Arabic: نادي الزمالك الرياضي), commonly referred to as Zamalek, is an Egyptian sports club based in Cairo, Egypt. The club is mainly known for its professional football team, which currently plays in the Egyptian Premier League, the top tier of the Egyptian football league system. The Zamalek SC football team has had managers from different nationalities throughout its history from 1911 till today. The list includes managers of the team since 1936. (Note: Zamalek SC was founded in 1911. But, there is no record of the Zamalek SC football team's managers before 1946.)

== List of managers ==
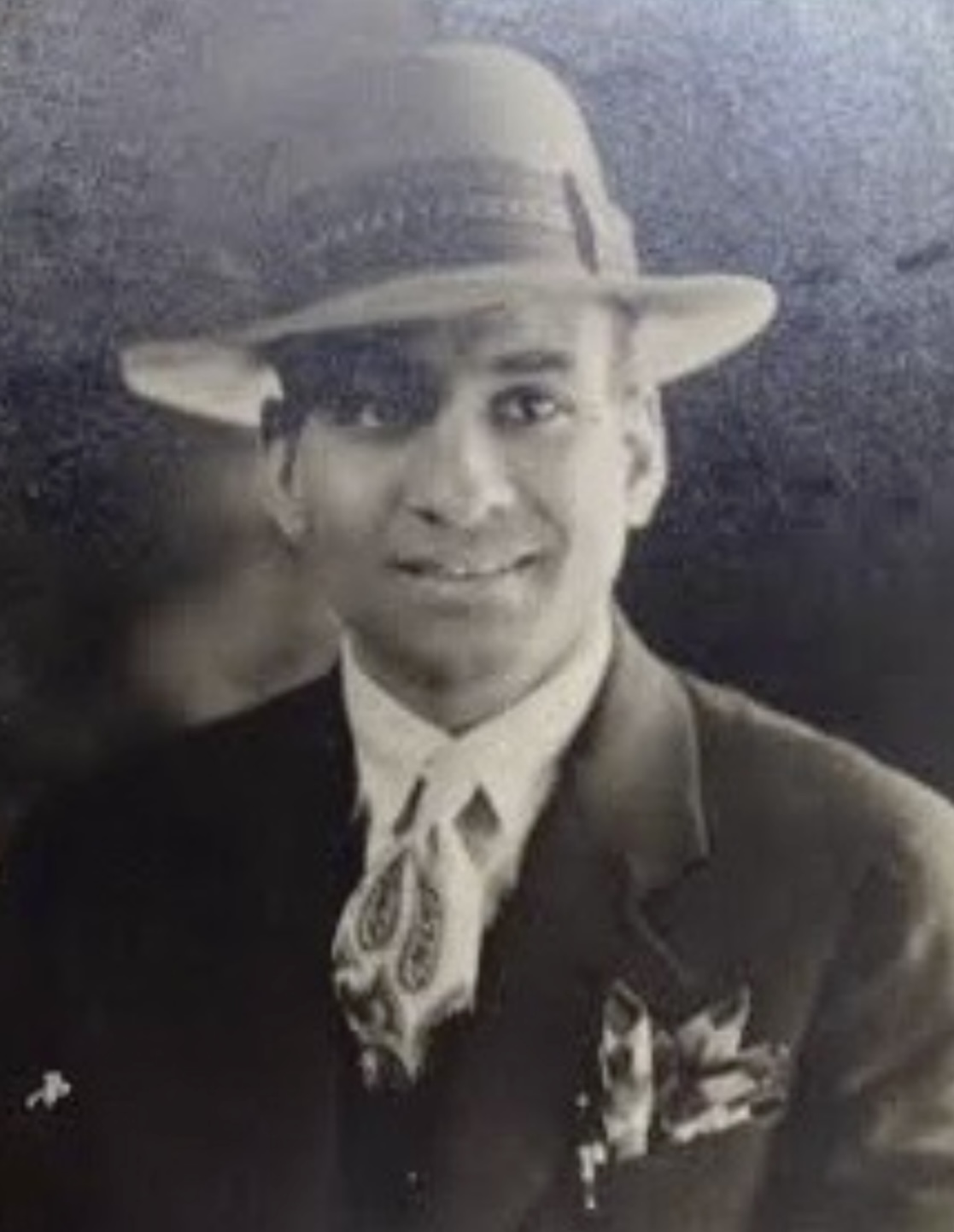
Tewfik Abdullah, former player and first known manager of Zamalek SC, and the most decorated manager in the history of the club.

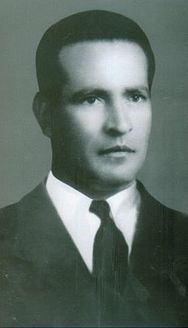
Abdulrahman Fawzi, former player, the longest-serving (10 years) and the second most decorated manager in the history of the club.

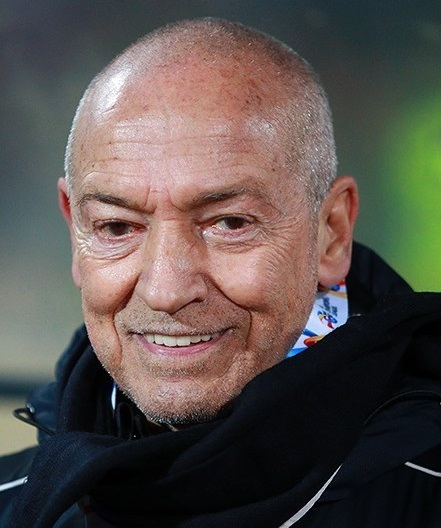
Jesualdo Ferreira, led the team to achieve the double twice.

This is a complete list of all the managers in the history of Zamalek SC football team since 1936.

Zamalek Sporting Club Managers
Manager	From	To	Played	Won	Drawn	Lost	Win% (Note: Win% is rounded to two decimal places.)	Honours
(Egypt) Tewfik Abdullah	1936	1945						1937–38 Egypt Cup; 1939–40 Cairo League; 1940–41 Egypt Cup; 1940–41 Cairo League; 1941 King Fouad Cup 1942–33 Egypt Cup; 1943–44 Egypt Cup; 1943–44 Cairo League; 1944–45 Cairo League
(Egypt) (Egypt) Abdulrahman Fawzi	1946	1956						1946–47 Cairo League; 1948–49 Cairo League; 1950–51 Cairo League; 1951–52 Cairo League; 1952–53 Cairo League; 1951–52 Egypt Cup; 1954–55 Egypt Cup
(Hungary) Géza Toldi	1956	1957						1956–57 Egypt Cup
(Socialist Federal Republic of Yugoslavia) Ivan "Iva" Stevović	1957	1960						1959–60 Egyptian Premier League/ 3 Egypt Cup 1957–58 shared with ahly - 1958–59 - 1959–60
(Socialist Federal Republic of Yugoslavia) Josef Vandler	1963	1965						1963–64 Egyptian Premier League; 1964–65 Egyptian Premier League
(Czechoslovakia) Ján Hucko	1973	1975						October League Cup
(Germany) Burkhard Pape	1975	1975						1974–75 Egypt Cup
(Egypt) Zaki Osman	1976	1978						1976–77 Egypt Cup; 1977–78 Egyptian Premier League
(Socialist Federal Republic of Yugoslavia) Mike Everitt	1981	1982						–
(Socialist Federal Republic of Yugoslavia) Velibor Vasović	1982	1983						–
(Egypt) Mahmoud Abou-Regaila	July 1983	July 1985						1984 African Cup of Champions Clubs; 1983–84 Egyptian Premier League
(Socialist Federal Republic of Yugoslavia) Dušan Nenković	1985	1986						Egyptian Friendship Cup
(England) Richie Barker	1986	1987						1986 African Cup of Champions Clubs
(Egypt) Essam Baheeg	1987	1988						1987–88 Egyptian Premier League; 1987 Egypt Cup; 1987 Afro-Asian Club Championship
(Egypt) Zaki Osman	1988	1989						–
(Brazil) Carlos	1989	1990						–
(Egypt) Mahmoud Abou-Regaila	July 1990	July 1991						–
(Scotland) Dave Mackay	July 1991	June 1993						1991–92 Egyptian Premier League; 1992–93 Egyptian Premier League
(Egypt) Mahmoud El-Gohary	July 1993	June 1994						1993 African Cup of Champions Clubs; 1994 CAF Super Cup
(Austria) Alfred Riedl	1994	1995						Egyptian Confederation Cup
(Germany) Werner Olk	1995	1997						1996 African Cup of Champions Clubs
(Germany) Diethelm Ferner	July 1996	June 1997						–
(Netherlands) Ruud Krol	1997	1999						1997 Afro-Asian Club Championship; 1997 CAF Super Cup
(Egypt) Farouk Gaafar	1999	1999						–
(Egypt) Mahmoud Abou-Regaila	April 1999	November 1999						1999 Egypt Cup
(Egypt) Helmy Toulan	1999	1999	–					
(Germany) Otto Pfister	July 1999	June 2002	81	53	13	15	65.43	2000 African Cup Winners' Cup; 2000–01 Egyptian Premier League; 2001–02 Egypt Cup
(Brazil) Carlos Roberto Cabral	July 2002	June 2003	41	32	8	1	78.05	2002 CAF Champions League; 2002–03 Egyptian Premier League; 2002 Egyptian Super Cup; 2003 CAF Super Cup
(Portugal) Nelo Vingada	July 2003	July 2004	33	26	6	1	78.79	2003–04 Egyptian Premier League; 2003 Arab Champions League; 2003 Saudi-Egyptian Super Cup
(Serbia) Dragoslav Stepanović	July 2004	November 2004	12	5	3	4	41.67	–
(Brazil) Carlos Roberto Cabral	November 2004	April 2005	22	7	8	7	31.82	–
(Germany) Theo Bücker	May 2005	August 2005	5	1	4	0	20.00	–
(Egypt) Farouk Gaafar	August 2005	December 2005	12	8	2	2	66.67	–
(Portugal) Manuel Cajuda	January 2006	December 2006	37	24	6	7	64.86	–
(Egypt) Mahmoud Saad	December 2006	May 2007	12	9	3	0	75.00	–
(France) Henri Michel	January 2007	August 2007	37	23	7	7	62.16	–
(Netherlands) Ruud Krol	August 2007	June 2008	35	21	5	9	60.00	2008 Egypt Cup
(Germany) Reiner Hollmann	1 July 2008	6 December 2008	20	5	5	10	25.00	–
(Switzerland) Michel Decastel	11 January 2009	28 August 2009	19	6	6	7	31.58	–
(France) Henri Michel	29 August 2009	29 November 2009	7	2	1	4	28.57	–
(Egypt) Hossam Hassan	30 November 2009	13 July 2011	58	29	17	12	50.00	–
(Egypt) Hassan Shehata	13 July 2011	26 July 2012	15	10	2	3	66.67	–
(Brazil) Jorvan Vieira	10 August 2012	5 July 2013	26	18	5	3	69.23	–
(Egypt) Helmy Toulan	6 July 2013	21 January 2014	30	22	3	5	73.33	2013 Egypt Cup
(Egypt) Mido	21 January 2014	24 July 2014	36	21	8	7	58.33	2014 Egypt Cup
(Egypt) Hossam Hassan	30 July 2014	2 October 2014	19	14	3	2	73.68	–
(Egypt) Mohamed Salah^{[C]}	2 October 2014	12 October 2014	0	0	0	0	—	–
(Portugal) Jaime Pacheco	10 October 2014	1 January 2015	15	11	3	1	73.33	–
(Egypt) Mohamed Salah^{[C]}	1 January 2015	8 February 2015	5	3	2	0	60.00	–
(Portugal) Jesualdo Ferreira	8 February 2015	21 November 2015	41	28	7	6	68.29	2014–15 Egyptian Premier League; 2015 Egypt Cup
(Brazil) Marcos Paquetá	5 December 2015	3 January 2016	5	2	2	1	40.00	–
(Egypt) Mido	3 January 2016	9 February 2016	7	4	1	2	57.14	–
(Egypt) Mohamed Salah^{[C]}	9 February 2016	27 February 2016	3	2	1	0	66.67	–
(Scotland) Alex McLeish	27 February 2016	2 May 2016	10	6	2	2	60.00	–
(Egypt) Mohammed Helmy	2 May 2016	27 July 2016	15	10	3	2	66.67	–
(Egypt) Moamen Soliman	30 July 2016	19 November 2016	10	7	1	2	70.00	2016 Egypt Cup
(Egypt) Mohamed Salah^{[C]}	19 November 2016	28 November 2016	2	1	1	0	50.00	–
(Egypt) Mohammed Helmy	28 November 2016	1 April 2017	23	14	3	6	60.87	2016 Egyptian Super Cup
(Portugal) Augusto Inácio	2 April 2017	27 July 2017	23	10	6	7	43.48	–
(Egypt) Tarek Yehia^{[C]}	28 July 2017	15 August 2017	2	1	0	1	50.00	–
(Montenegro) Nebojša Jovović	16 August 2017	3 January 2018	18	10	4	4	55.56	–
(Egypt) Ehab Galal	3 January 2018	13 April 2018	17	8	2	7	47.06	–
(Egypt) Khaled Galal^{[C]}	13 April 2018	3 July 2018	6	5	1	0	83.33	2018 Egypt Cup
(Switzerland) Christian Gross	3 July 2018	1 July 2019	47	31	11	5	65.96	2018 Saudi-Egyptian Super Cup; 2018–19 CAF Confederation Cup
(Egypt) Khaled Galal^{[C]}	1 July 2019	29 July 2019	3	1	1	1	33.33	–
(Egypt) Tarek Yehia^{[C]}	29 July 2019	18 August 2019	1	1	0	0	100.00	–
(Serbia) Milutin Sredojević	19 August 2019	2 December 2019	13	8	1	4	61.54	2019 Egypt Cup
(France) Patrice Carteron	2 December 2019	15 September 2020	31	18	10	3	58.06	2020 Egyptian Super Cup; 2020 CAF Super Cup
(Egypt) Tarek Yehia^{[C]}	15 September 2020	27 September 2020	3	2	0	1	66.67	–
(Portugal) Jaime Pacheco	28 September 2020	12 March 2021	27	17	6	4	62.96	–
(France) Patrice Carteron	12 March 2021	28 February 2022	25	19	4	2	76.00	2020–21 Egyptian Premier League
(Egypt) Osama Nabih^{[C]}	28 February 2022	7 March 2022	2	2	0	0	100.00	–
(Portugal) Jesualdo Ferreira	8 March 2022	24 January 2023	52	31	13	8	59.62	2020–21 Egypt Cup; 2021–22 Egyptian Premier League
(Egypt) Osama Nabih^{[C]}	24 January 2023	1 February 2023	1	1	0	0	100.00	–
(Portugal) Jesualdo Ferreira	1 February 2023	22 March 2023	9	2	2	5	22.22	–
(Egypt) Ahmed Abdulmaqsoud^{[C]}	22 March 2023	13 April 2023	5	3	0	2	60.00	–
(Colombia) Juan Carlos Osorio	13 April 2023	5 November 2023	22	12	5	5	54.55	–
(Egypt) Motamed Gamal^{[C]}	5 November 2023	2 February 2024	7	4	2	1	57.14	–
(Portugal) José Gomes	2 February 2024	15 December 2024	47	25	13	9	53.19	2023–24 CAF Confederation Cup; 2024 CAF Super Cup
(Switzerland) Christian Gross	15 December 2024	13 February 2025	14	9	3	2	64.29	–
(Portugal) José Peseiro	14 February 2025	7 May 2025	18	8	8	2	44.44	–
(Egypt) Ayman El Ramadi^{[C]}	7 May 2025	4 July 2025	5	2	2	1	40.00	2024–25 Egypt Cup
(Belgium) Yannick Ferrera	4 July 2025	1 November 2025		1	1			100.00
