= Zaki Osman (footballer, born 1932) =

Egyptian footballer

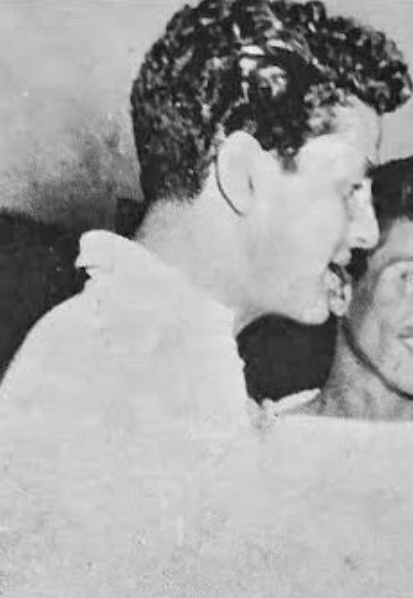
- Osman with Zamalek in the 1950s

Personal information
- Date of birth: 14 April 1932
- Date of death: 14 November 2014 (aged 82)
- Place of death: Cairo, Egypt

Youth career
- 1946: Al-Sekka Al-Hadid

Senior career*
Years	Team	Apps	(Gls)
1949–1951	Al-Sekka Al-Hadid		
1951–1952	Al Ahly		
1952–1960	Zamalek		

International career
- Egypt

Managerial career
- ?–?: Menya Al-Qamh
- ?–?: Al-Miah
- 1967–1969: Zamalek U-18
- 1970: Yemen
- 1971: Al-Nassr
- 1971–1972: Zamalek U-18
- 1972–1973: Zamalek (UAE) / Al-Wasl
- 1974: Egypt U-21
- 1975–1976: Zamalek (Asst. manager)
- 1976–1978: Zamalek
- 1983–1984: Al-Jabalain
- 1988–1989: Zamalek
- 1990–1991: Al-Khaleej
Medal record
Men's football
Representing Egypt (as player)
Arab Games
Gold medal – first place	1953
- * Club domestic league appearances and goals

Zaki Osman (Arabic: زكي عثمان; 14 April 1932 – 14 November 2014) was an Egyptian football manager and former football player who played for Zamalek., He also played for the Egypt national team, he was a part of the team that won the 1953 Arab Games. As a manager, he was nicknamed (Coach's Sheikh) (Arabic: شيخ المدربين).

Zaki Osman left a mark in Zamalek's history as a player and coach, and is known as the "Sheikh of Coaches" and one of the most outstanding Egyptian players in the 1950s.

== Early life ==
Zaki Osman was born on 14 April 1932 in Cairo. He began playing football as a young boy in the streets and neighborhoods of Cairo, he then moved at the age of 14 to El Sekka El Hadid SC.

== Playing career ==
He played for El Sekka El Hadid's first team in 1949. After two years with El Sekka, he moved to Al Ahly in 1951, he achieved with his new club the Egyptian Premier League title and the Egypt Cup title in 1951–52 season. However, after only this season, he left Al Ahly.

In 1952, he moved to Zamalek, his old team's main competitor, as he was originally a Zamalek fan coming from a family that were also fans of Zamalek. After moving to Zamalek, the administration of Al Ahly announced that he was forced to move to Zamalek, however, Osman's father submitted a report to the Public Prosecutor to prove that his son moved to Zamalek of his own free will. Othman has built his history as a player with Zamalek, he won with the club the Cairo League title in (1952–53), Egypt Cup in (1955, 1957, 1958, 1959, 1960) and the Egyptian Premier League title in (1959–60). He preferred to retire in 1960 at an early age, 28, to begin his coaching career.

Osman played for the Egypt national football team, he was a part of the team that won the gold medal in the 1953 Arab Games in Alexandria.

== Coaching career ==
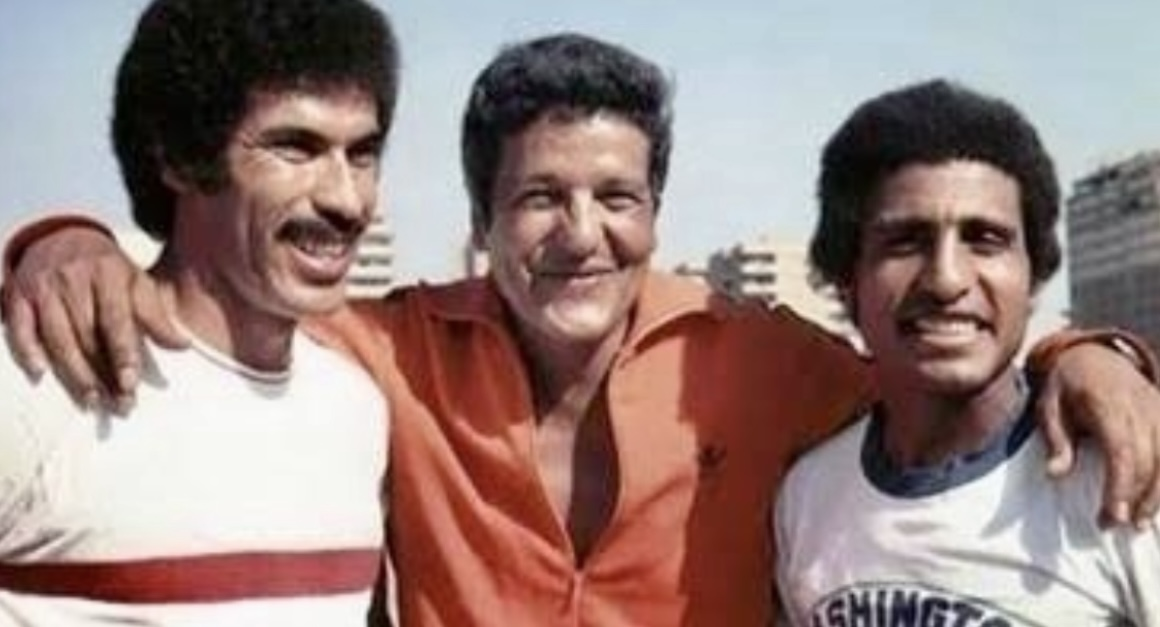
Zamalek's manager Zaki Osman (middle) with Hassan Shehata and Farouk Gaafar in 1976

Osman began his coaching career by leading El-Minya El-Qamh team, then the water company, and then the Zamalek U-18 team. He moved to Yemen and led the Yemen national football team. He then returned to leading the U-21 Egypt national football team.

In 1974, he worked in Zamalek as an assistant manager to Burkhard Pape, and Zamalek won the Egypt Cup in 1975. In 1976, Osman became tha manager of the Zamalek's first team. The team in this era included Egyptian football stars such as; Hassan Shehata, Ali Khalil, Farouk Gaafar, Taha Basry, Mahmoud El-Khawaga, Mohamed Tawfiq, Mohamed Salah, and others. As a manager, his most prominent achievement is winning the 1977 Egypt Cup, and the 1977–78 Egyptian Premier League titles. He then worked in the Gulf area before retiring from coaching permanently in 1991.

== Honours ==
=== Player ===
Al Ahly

- Egyptian Premier League: 1951–52
- Egypt Cup: 1951–52

Zamalek

- Egyptian Premier League: 1959–60
- Egypt Cup: 1954–55, 1956–57, 1957–58, 1958–59, 1959–60
- Cairo League: 1952–53

Egypt

- Arab Games: 1953

=== Head coach ===
Zamalek

- Egyptian Premier League: 1977–78
- Egypt Cup: 1976–77
