= Mohamed Monir =

Mohamed Monir may refer to:

- Mohamed Mounir (born 1954), Egyptian singer and actor
- Mohamed Monir (swimmer) (born 1984), Egyptian swimmer
- Mohamed El Monir (born 1992), Libyan footballer

== See also ==
- Monir (name)
