= Monir (name) =

Monir is a given name and a surname. Notable people with the name include:

== Given name ==
- Mehr Monir Jahanbani (1926–2018), Iranian fashion designer and visual artist
- Monir Al Badarin (born 2005), Bulgarian-Palestinian footballer
- Monir Benmoussa (born 1994), Norwegian footballer
- Monir Haidar, Bangladeshi journalist, writer and politician
- Monir Hossain (born 1985), Bangladeshi cricketer
- Monir Hossain Manu (1959–2018), Bangladeshi footballer
- Monir Khan (born 1972), Bangladeshi singer
- Monir Shahroudy Farmanfarmaian (1922–2019), Iranian artist and a collector of traditional folk art
- Monir Vakili (1924–1983), Iranian soprano

== Surname ==
- Anwar Hossain Monir (born 1981), Bangladeshi cricketer
- Manirul Islam Monir (born 1952), Bangladeshi politician
- Mohamed Monir (swimmer) (born 1984), Egyptian swimmer
- Mohamed El Monir (born 1992), Libyan footballer
- Moniruzzaman Monir (born 1952), Bangladeshi music lyricist
- Soto Monir (born 1978), Bangladeshi politician

== See also ==
- Monir (disambiguation)
- Munir
