= Mahmoud Saad (footballer, born 1952) =

Egyptian footballer and manager

Personal information
- Full name: Mahmoud Saad El-Din Ahmed Abdel-Kader
- Date of birth: 3 March 1952 (age 74)
- Place of birth: Khanka, Egypt
- Position: Centre-back

Youth career
- 1968–1970: Zamalek

Senior career*
Years	Team	Apps	(Gls)
1970–1971	Zamalek		
1971–1974	Al-Safa'		
1975–1981	Zamalek		

International career
1975–1980	Egypt		

Managerial career
- 1989–1990: Saudi Club
- 1991–1992: Egypt U20
- 1992: Zamalek (assistant)
- 1994–1995: Al-Safa'
- 1996–1997: Zamalek (assistant)
- 1998–1999: Lebanon
- 1999: Zamalek (staff)
- 2001–2002: Al-Safa'
- 2002–2003: Zamalek (assistant)
- 2004: El-Qanah
- 2005–2006: Al-Merrikh
- 2006: Zamalek (caretaker)
- 2006–2007: Zamalek (assistant)
- 2009: Zamalek (assistant)
- * Club domestic league appearances and goals

Mahmoud Saad El-Din Ahmed Abdel-Kader (Arabic: مَحْمُود سَعْد الدِّين أَحْمَد عَبْد الْقَادِر; born 3 March 1952) is an Egyptian football manager and former player, who played for the national team. He has previously coached Zamalek SC, as well as the Egypt national Olympic team at the 1992 Summer Olympics.

== Career ==
Saad played in Zamalek's youth teams in 1968. He played for the first team in 1970. Due to football activities stoppage for the War of Attrition, he moved to Al-Safa' in 1971 and played until 1974.

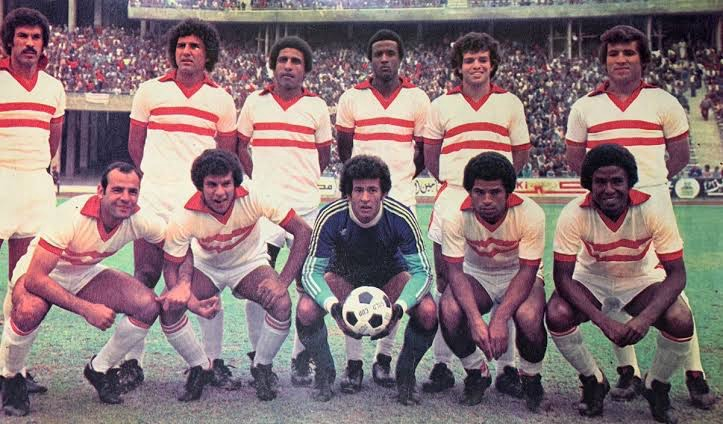
Saad (second sitting from right) with Zamalek in 1978

He returned to Egypt and played for Zamalek in 1975. He won with Zamalek the Egyptian Premier League in (1977–78), and the Egypt Cup in (1975, 1977, 1979). He spent the rest of his career with the Cairo Giants. He retired in 1981.

After retirement, he worked as a head coach. He had several spells with Zamalek in the youth teams and the first team. He also coached the Lebanon national football team and won the third place at the Friendship Tournament third place in 1998. With Al-Merrikh SC, he won the Sudan Cup in 2006.

== Honours ==
=== Player ===
Zamalek

- Egyptian Premier League: 1977–78
- Egypt Cup: 1975, 1977, 1979

=== Manager ===
Lebanon

- Friendship Tournament third place: 1998

Al-Merrikh SC

- Sudan Cup: 2006
