= Helmy Toulan =

Egyptian football manager (born 1949)

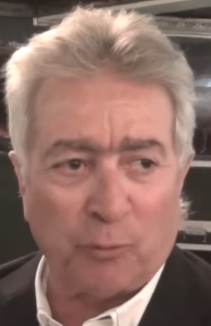
- Toulan in 2013

Personal information
- Full name: Helmy Ezzat Helmy Toulan
- Date of birth: 30 November 1949 (age 76)
- Place of birth: Egypt
- Position: Midfielder

Senior career*
Years	Team	Apps	(Gls)
1972–1981	Zamalek		

Managerial career
- 1979–1984: Al-Wahda
- 1984–1985: Zamalek U20
- 1986–1988: Khaleeg club
- 1988–1990: Zamalek (youth team)
- 1991–1992: Zamalek
- 1992–1993: Ghazl Domiat
- 1993–1994: Egypt U20
- 1994–1999: Egypt U23
- 1999–2000: Zamalek
- 2000–2002: Zamalek (assistant)
- 2002–2006: Haras El-Hodood
- 2007: Al-Masry
- 2008–2009: Itesalat
- 2009: Al-Ahly (Benghazi)
- 2010–2011: Petrojet
- 2011–2012: Ittihad El-Shorta
- 2012–2013: Haras El-Hodood
- 2013–2014: Zamalek
- 2014: Tala'ea El-Gaish
- 2015: Smouha
- 2016: Smouha
- 2016: Smouha
- 2017–2018: Tala'ea El-Gaish
- 2018–2019: Al-Ittihad Alexandria
- 2019–2022: ENPPI SC
- 2022–2023: Bank El Ahly
- 2023: Ceramica Cleopatra
- 2025: Egypt B'
- * Club domestic league appearances and goals

Helmy Ezzat Helmy Toulan (Arabic: حلمي عزت حلمي طولان) (born 30 November 1949) is an Egyptian football coach and former player with Zamalek SC.

== Career ==
Toulan grew up in Zamalek youth teams. He played his first match for the first team in 1972. Toulan spent his whole professional career with Zamalek and played for the first team from 1972 to 1981. He won with Zamalek the October League Cup in (1974), the Egyptian Premier League in (1977–78). He also won with the White Castle the Egypt Cup in (1974–75, 1976–77, 1978–79). He also played for the Egypt national football team. Toulan retired from professional football in 1981.

After retiring, he worked as a football manager. Toulan coached the Emirati side Al-Wahda FC from 1979 to 1984. He then managed Zamalek U-20 team winning the U-20 Egyptian League in 1984–85 season. In 1986, he managed Saudi club Al-Khaleej and worked with them for 2 seasons until 1988. He also coached Egypt national under-20 football team from 1993 to 1994, and the Egypt national under-23 football team from 1994 to 1999. Toulan managed several teams including his home team Zamalek SC, he also coached Haras El Hodoud SC, Telecom Egypt SC, El Masry SC, El Shorta SC. On July 7, 2013, he was announced as the new coach of Zamalek SC, succeeding Brazilian coach Jorvan Vieira. He led the team to win the 2013 Egypt Cup for the first time in five years. He was dismissed on January 21, 2014. He then coached Smouha, Tala'ea El Gaish SC, Al-Ittihad Alexandria, ENPPI SC, Bank El Ahly and Ceramica Cleopatra.

In May 2025, he was appointed as the head coach of the Egyptian national team for the 2025 FIFA Arab Cup.

== Managerial statistics ==
As of match played 22 December 2020

Managerial record by team and tenure
Team	From	To	Record					Ref.
Team	From	To	P	W	D	L	Win %	Ref.
Zamalek	28 November 1999	2 December 1999	1	1	0	0	100.0	
Haras	1 July 2002	30 June 2006	104	40	32	32	38.5	
Al Masry	1 July 2007	1 November 2007	9	1	3	5	11.1	
Telecom	1 July 2008	4 March 2009	6	0	2	4	0.0	
Petrojet	8 June 2010	26 May 2011	23	9	5	9	39.1	
El Shorta	21 July 2011	20 June 2012	17	8	5	4	47.1	
Haras	1 July 2012	6 July 2013	15	4	6	5	26.7	
Zamalek	6 July 2013	21 January 2014	16	8	3	5	50.0	
Tala'ea	12 March 2014	18 June 2014	10	5	4	1	50.0	
Smouha	11 January 2015	26 June 2015	23	11	6	6	47.8	
Smouha	19 February 2016	11 July 2016	15	8	5	2	53.3	
Smouha	1 November 2016	31 December 2016	11	4	5	2	36.4	
Tala'ea	29 November 2017	8 March 2018	16	6	1	9	37.5	
Al Ittihad	24 September 2018	22 May 2019	33	11	9	13	33.3	
ENPPI SC	18 October 2019	1 June 2022	89	31	35	23	34.8	
Bank El Ahly	1 December 2022	11 January 2023	8	1	4	3	12.5	
Ceramica Cleopatra	21 May 2023	18 July 2023	6	2	1	3	33.3	
Total			402	150	126	126	37.3	—

== Honours ==
=== Player ===
Zamalek SC

- Egyptian Premier League: 1977–78
- Egypt Cup: 1975, 1977, 1979
- October League Cup: 1974

=== Manager ===
Zamalek SC

- Egypt Cup: 2013
