= Munira =

Munira (also spelled Monireh, Arabic: منيرة, meaning luminous, bright, shining) is a female given name. Notable people with the given name include:

== Given name ==
- Munira A. Basrai, American geneticist
- Munira Fakhro, Bahraini academic
- Mounira El Mahdeya (1885–1965), Egyptian singer
- Monireh Gorji (1929–2025), Iranian teacher and mujtahid
- Munira Khalil, American chemist
- Munírih Khánum (1847–1938), prominent Bahá'í
- Munira Mirza (born 1978), British political adviser
- Munira Mosli (1954–2019), Saudi Arabian plastic arts worker and painter
- Munira al-Qubaysi (1933–2022), Syrian Sufi
- Monira Rahman (born 1965), Bangladeshi activist
- Munira Wilson (born 1978), British politician
- Munira Chame (born 1944), Brazilian humanitarian and dentist

== See also ==
- Munir
- Munira, a genus of Fly.
