= Munir =

Muneer (also spelled Moneer, Monir, Mounir, or Muneyr, Arabic: منير, meaning illuminating, lightsome, bright, luminous) is a masculine Arabic given name, it may refer to:

== Given name ==
- Muneer Ahmad, American professor of law
- Mounir Akbache (born 1999), French middle-distance runner
- Munir Akram (born 1945), Pakistan Ambassador to the United Nations from 2002 to 2008
- Munir al-Rayyes (1901–1992), was a prominent Syrian newspaper editor and writer
- Munir Awad (born 1981), citizen of Sweden who has fallen under suspicion of an association with terrorism
- Muneer Ahmed Badini (born 1953), Pakistani writer
- Munir Bashir (1930–1997), Assyrian musician
- Munir Bhatti (died 2024), Pakistani field hockey player
- Münir Ertegün (1883–1944), Turkish politician
- Muneer Fareed (born 1956), American scholar
- Münir Hüsrev Göle (1890–1955), Turkish politician
- Munir El Haddadi (born 1995), Moroccan footballer
- Mounir El Hamdaoui (born 1984), Dutch-Moroccan footballer
- Monir Haidar, Bangladeshi journalist and political analyst
- Monir Hossain (born 1985), Bangladeshi cricketer
- Monir Hossain Manu (1959–2018), Bangladeshi footballer
- Munir Ahmad Khan (1926–1999), Pakistani nuclear engineer
- Mounir Maasri (born 1940), Lebanese actor
- Mounir El Motassadeq (born 1974), Moroccan al-Qaeda member
- Mounir Mourad (1922–1981), Egyptian artist
- Munir Bin Naseer, citizen of Pakistan who was detained in Guantanamo Bay
- Munir Niazi (1923–2006), Urdu poet
- Monir Fakhri Abdel Nour (born 1945), Egyptian politician
- Münir Özkul (1925–2018), Turkish cinema and theatre actor
- Munir Ahmad Rashid (born 1934), Pakistani mathematician, and nuclear scientist
- Muneer Sait (born 1940), Indian field hockey goalkeeper
- Münir Nurettin Selçuk (1900–1981), Turkish classical musician and tenor singer
- Munir Said Thalib (1965–2004), Indonesian activist
- Munir Shakir (1969–2025), Pakistani Islamic cleric
- Mounir Yemmouni (born 1983), French middle-distance runner
- Mounir Zeghdoud (born 1970), Algerian footballer
- Munir Sarhadi (1931–1980), Pakistani instrumentalist and Sarinda-player
- M. K. Muneer (born 1962), Indian politician, doctor and former Health Minister, Kerala state.

== Surname ==
- Asim Munir (born 1968), Pakistan Army general
- Mazhar Munir, British television actor
- Mohamed Mounir (born 1954), Egyptian singer
- Muhammad Munir (1895–1979), Pakistani judge
- Qusay Munir (born 1981), Iraqi footballer

== Compound names with Munir as a prefix ==
- Munir-ul-Islam (disambiguation), multiple people
- Munir-uz-Zaman (disambiguation), multiple people
- Munir-ul-Haqq, multiple people
  - Munir-ul-Haqq Sakku, first Mayor of Comilla, Bangladesh
  - Munir-ul-Haqq Chowdhury, Bangladeshi politician and general secretary of Mohammedan Sporting Club
- Munir-ud-Din, multiple people
  - Munir-ud-Din Khan (born 1974), Bengali poet and writer
  - Munir-ud-Din Yusuf (1919–1987), Bangladeshi writer, journalist and translator
- A. K. Mohammad Munir-ul-Bahar, Bangladesh Air Force officer and Vice Chancellor of Aviation and Aerospace University
- Quazi Munir-ul-Huda, Bangladeshi lawyer and politician

== See also ==
- Monir (disambiguation)
- Munira
- Monir-Khuku murder case
