= Munira A. Basrai =

American geneticist

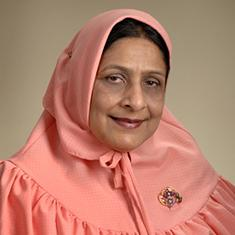
- Education: University of Tennessee (PhD)
- Scientific career
- Fields: Genetics, cancer research
- Workplaces: National Cancer Institute
- Thesis: Modes of nutrient uptake in Candida albicans: peptide transport and fluid phase endocytosis (1992)
- Doctoral advisor: Jeffrey M. Becker

Munira Adnan Basrai is an American geneticist researching genome stability and cell cycle regulation in yeast and human cancers. She is a senior investigator at the National Cancer Institute.

== Education ==
Basrai received a Ph.D. from the University of Tennessee. Her 1992 dissertation was titled, Modes of nutrient uptake in Candida albicans: peptide transport and fluid phase endocytosis. Basrai's doctoral advisor was Jeffrey M. Becker. She completed postdoctoral research with Philip Hieter in the department of molecular biology and genetics at Johns Hopkins School of Medicine.

== Career and research ==
Basrai joined the genetics branch at the National Cancer Institute (NCI) in 1998 and was promoted to tenure in 2006. She is a senior investigator and head of the yeast genome stability section. She researches genome stability and cell cycle regulation in yeast and human cancers. Basrai co-chairs the NCI Cell Cycle Interest Group since 2005 and serves on the steering committee for the Center of Excellence of Chromosome Biology (CECB) since 2007. Basrai served on the Cancer Advisory Board for three years (2008-2011).
