= Mohammad Monirul Islam =

Mohammad Monirul Islam may refer to:

- Mohammad Monirul Islam (politician), Bangladeshi politician
- Md. Monirul Islam (diplomat), ambassador of Bangladesh to Italy, Egypt, and Morocco
- Mohammad Monirul Islam (diplomat), ambassador of Bangladesh to Uzbekistan

== See also ==
- Monirul Islam (disambiguation)
