= Monir =

Monir may refer to:

== People ==
- Monir (name), a list of people with the given name and the surname

== Places ==
- Ba Monir, a village in Cheghapur Rural District, Kaki District, Dashti County, Bushehr province, Iran
- Baba Monir, a city and the capital of Mahur Milani District, Mamasani County, Fars province, Iran
- Emamzadeh Monir, a village in Mahur Rural District, Mahvarmilani District, Mamasani County, Fars province, Iran
- Heydarabad-e Baba Monir, a village in Doshman Ziari Rural District, Doshman Ziari District, Mamasani County, Fasa province, Iran

== See also ==
- Munir, an Arabic name
