= Farouk Gaafar =

Egyptian footballer and manager (born 1952)

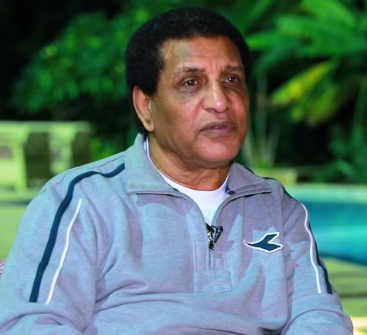

Personal information
- Full name: Farouk Fouad Gaafar
- Date of birth: 29 October 1952 (age 74)
- Place of birth: Mounira, Cairo, Egypt
- Position: Midfielder

Senior career*
Years	Team	Apps	(Gls)
1971–1979	Zamalek		
1979-1980	New York Cosmos		
1980-1987	Zamalek		

International career
1970–1981	Egypt	62	(7)

Managerial career
- 1990–1991: Gomhoriat Shebin
- 1991–1993: Zamalek (assistant)
- 1995–1996: Zamalek (assistant)
- 1996–1997: Egypt
- 1998–1998: Baladeyet El-Mahalla
- 1998–1998: Zamalek (assistant)
- 1998–1999: Zamalek
- 1999–1999: Montakhab Suez
- 2000–2002: Ghazl El Mahalla
- 2002–2002: Ismaily
- 2002–2002: Al-Riyadh
- 2003–2003: Baladeyet El-Mahalla
- 2003–2003: Tersana
- 2003–2004: Al-Masry
- 2005–2005: Suez Cement
- 2005–2005: Zamalek
- 2006–2008: Tersana
- 2008–2013: Tala'ea El-Gaish
- 2013–2014: Ghazl El Mahalla
- 2015–2015: Al-Ansar
- 2016–2016: El Dakhleya
Medal record
Men's football
Representing Egypt (as player)
African Games
Bronze medal – third place	1973
Africa Cup of Nations
Third place	1974
- * Club domestic league appearances and goals

Farouk Gaafar (Arabic: فاروق جعفر; born 29 October 1952) is an Egyptian football manager and former football player. Nicknamed "Roo'a" and King of Midfield (Arabic: ملك النص), he played as a midfielder for Zamalek and the Egypt national team. He was a talented midfielder, constantly in the starting lineup for the national team. Gaafar finished seventh in the African Player of the Year, by France Football in 1975 and eighth in 1977. Following his retirement, Gaafar managed Egypt during 1996 and 1997 and later El Geish club.

== Early life and education ==
Farouk Fouad Gaafar was born in Mounira, Cairo on 29 October 1952. His origin is from Aswan in Upper Egypt. His grandfather migrated to Cairo after the construction of the High Dam. He had 10 brothers and sisters. In 1963, in the streets of El-Munira neighborhood, Zamalek's scout Ibrahim Abdel-Rahman, saw Gaafar playing and enrolled him in the Zamalek U-14 youth team without his family’s knowledge after he obtained a preparatory certificate from Manial El-Rawda School. Afterwards, he joined the National Secondary School in Manial. Gaafar has a Bachelor's degree in physical education.

== Club career ==
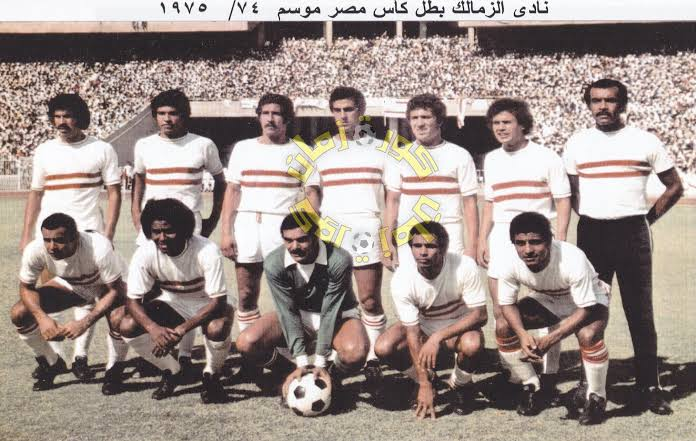
Gaafar (front row, first from right) with Zamalek squad, winners of the 1975 Egypt Cup

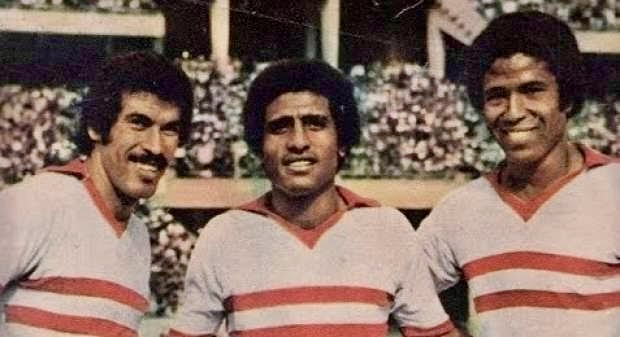
Gaafar (middle), Hassan Shehata and Taha Basry with Zamalek in 1978

Farouk Gaafar played in Zamalek's youth teams from 1963, he played for six years before being chosen for the first team, he trained under many notable coaches such as Hilal Qadri, Hamada El-Sharkawy, and Samir Qotb. He played in the Egypt national team before playing for the first team, as the Egyptian League was stopped, and not resumed until 1971–72 season.

In 1969, when he was 17 years old, Zamalek played against El Sekka, and Zamalek was down by two goals, and Gaafar played in the second half, and Zamalek scored three goals with Gaafar scoring two goals. Afterwards, he joined the first team and played his first match against Factory 36, and Zamalek won four goals, and Farouk scored two goals in his first official match. In front of Ghazl El Mahalla, he played as a right-back instead of Yakan Hussein. Gaafar became known all over Egypt after the 1972 Cairo derby which Zamalek won Al Ahly by a score of 2–1, and the referee had awarded a penalty kick, from which Gaafar scored a goal, and Al Ahly's goalkeeper Marwan Kanafani asked Al Ahly fans to enter the pitch. The 1971–72 league's result was cancelled. He played for the team for 16 years from 1971 to 1987, he was nicknamed the "King of midfield", he scored over 53 goals for Zamalek in the Egyptian Premier League. Gaafar won with Zamalek two titles of the Egyptian Premier League (1977–78, 1983–84). Gaafar won the October League Cup (held instead of the cancelled Egyptian Premier League) once in 1974. He also won three Egypt Cup titles (1974–75, 1976–77, 1978–79). Gaafar was lucky to play amongst more than a generation of Zamalek in his career. He was one of the best Egyptian players of his generation.

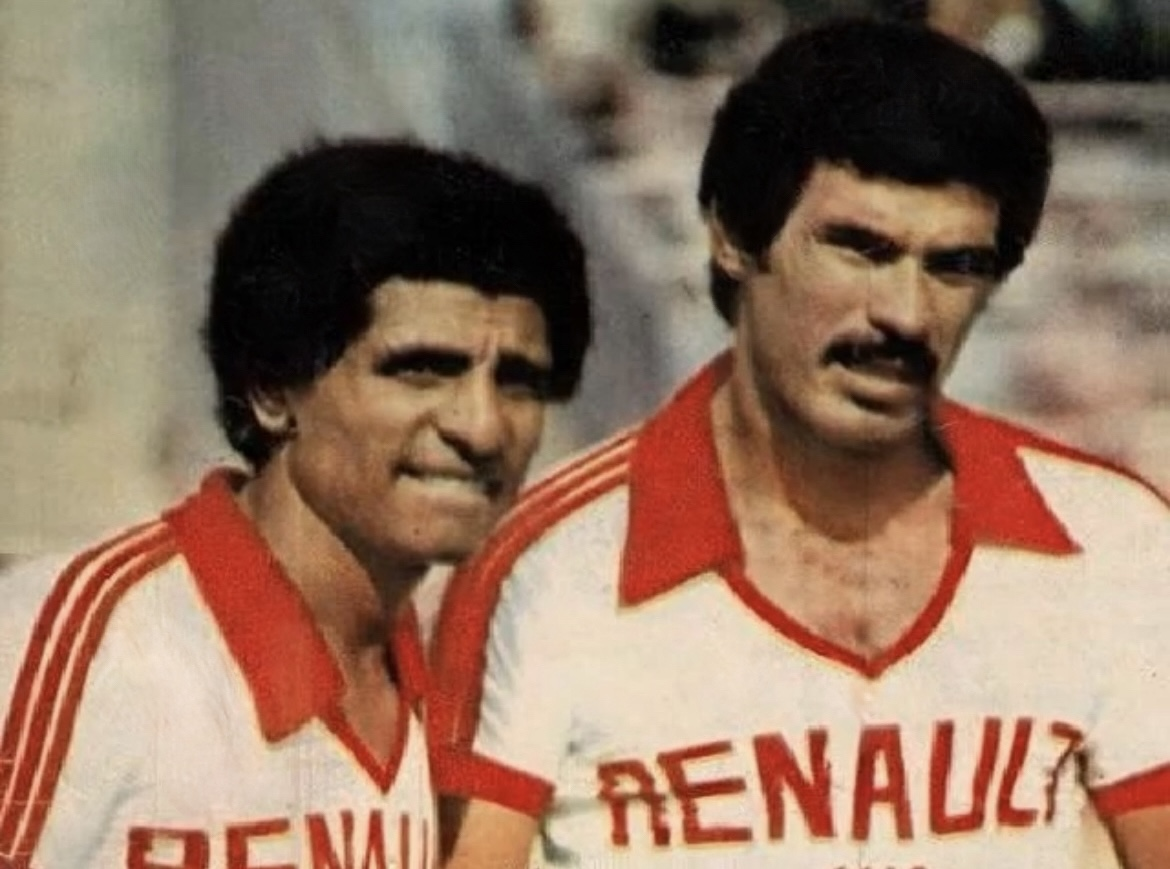
Gaafar (left) with Hassan Shehata with Zamalek in 1981

In 1979, Gaafar had a brief spell in New York Cosmos. After Zamalek's refusal of Gaafar signing to Al Ain FC in Emirates, Gaafar travelled to the United States and played for Cosmos, since rules were allowing him to play in the U.S. without his club's permission. However, after rules changed in 1980, he came back home and asked Zamalek for permission, but unfortunately, the club refused, and he left New York Cosmos without even signing a contract and returned to Zamalek.

At the continental level, Gaafar won with Zamalek the 1984 African Cup of Champions Clubs and 1986 African Cup of Champions Clubs. Gaafar scored 64 goals for Zamalek in all competitions. Gaafar retired as a player in 1987. A retirement festival had taken place in Cairo Stadium, with a friendly match between Egypt and Kuwait in 1988.

== International career ==
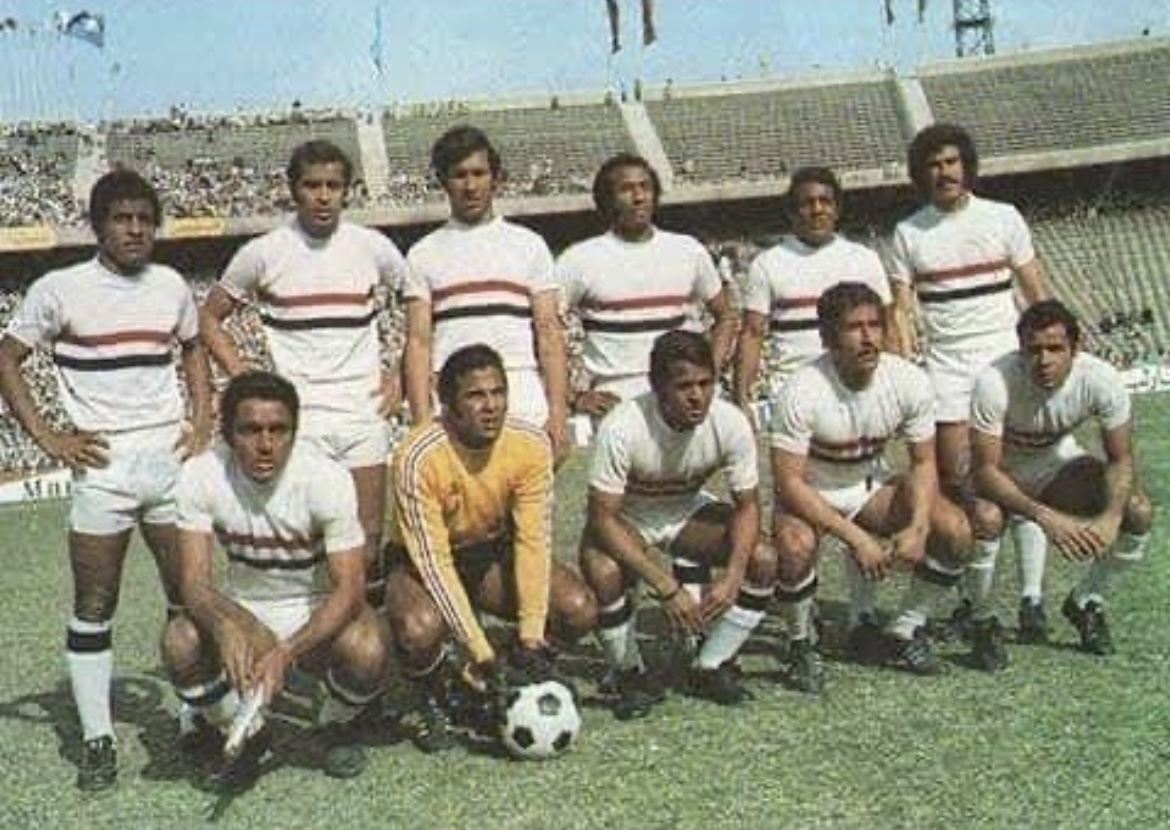
Gaafar (first standing from left) with Egypt in the 1974 African Cup of Nations

Gaafar played for the Egypt national team for 11 years from 1970 to 1981, he played 62 international caps and scored 7 goals. He was a part of the team that won the 1972 Palestine Cup of Nations. Gaafar was also a part of the team that won the bronze medal in the 1973 African Games in Nigeria, and scored in the group stage against Upper Volta and in the semifinals against Nigeria. Gaafar was part of the team that finished third in the 1974 African Cup of Nations in Egypt.

He was part of the team that finished fourth in the 1976 African Cup of Nations in Ethiopia and fourth in the 1980 African Cup of Nations in Nigeria. He won the best playmaker award in 1974 African Cup of Nations and was included in the 1974 CAN dream team and he also won the best playmaker in the 1976 African Cup of Nations and was included in the 1976 CAN dream team. He was a part of the team that won the 1975 Palestine Cup of Nations. Gaafar came the 7th African footballer of the year by France Football in 1975, and 8th African footballer of the year by France Football in 1977.

== Managerial career ==
Gaafar worked as assistant in Zamalek at the beginning of his coaching career. His first venture as a manager was in the 1990–91 season for Gomhoriat Shebin. He worked as assistant coach for Zamalek for two years from 1991 to 1993, followed by the 1995–96 season, also as an assistant coach for Zamalek. In 1996, he was appointed by the Egyptian Football Association as the head coach of the Egypt national team along with Mahmoud El-Khatib as Sports Manager. He worked as manager for Baladiyat El Mahalla SC in 1998–99. Again as Zamalek assistant in 1998–99. He was appointed as Zamalek’s caretaker in 1999. He worked for two seasons as manager for Montakhab El Suez in 2000–2002. He also managed Ghazl El Mahalla in 2002 and reached the Egypt Cup final. He managed Ismaily in 2002. Followed by Al-Riyadh in 2003, and Baladiyat El Mahalla in 2003. The next season in Tersana in 2003–2004, Al-Masry in 2005, Suez Cement in 2005–2005, Zamalek in 2006, Tersana in 2008–2013. He managed Tala'ea El-Gaish in 2013–2014, Ghazl El Mahalla in 2015–2015. He was appointed as manager for the Lebanese side Al-Ansar in 2016–2016. Followed by El Dakhleya the same season.

== Managerial statistics ==
As of match played 4 August 2016

Managerial record by team and tenure
Team	From	To	Record					Ref.
Team	From	To	P	W	D	L	Win %	Ref.
Egypt	1 July 1996	1 March 1997	2	1	0	1	50.0	
Baladeyet	1 July 1998	21 November 1998	1	0	0	1	0.0	
Zamalek SC	8 December 1998	16 April 1999	9	4	3	2	44.4	
Suez SC	18 November 1999	30 November 1999	1	1	0	0	100.0	
Ghazl	1 August 2000	30 June 2002	29	8	12	9	27.6	
Ismaily SC	1 July 2002	18 October 2002	4	3	0	1	75.0	
Baladeyet	2 March 2003	15 October 2003	15	4	4	7	26.7	
Tersana SC	15 October 2003	22 December 2003	5	3	1	1	60.0	
Al Masry SC	22 December 2003	6 November 2004	26	7	12	7	26.9	
Suez Cement	17 June 2005	18 August 2005	1	1	0	0	100.0	
Zamalek SC	18 August 2005	30 December 2005	19	11	2	6	57.9	
Tersana SC	20 June 2006	30 June 2008	64	16	21	27	25.0	
El Gaish	10 January 2008	5 January 2013	141	42	53	46	29.8	
Ghazl	9 September 2013	19 January 2014	5	1	1	3	20.0	
Al Ansar FC	24 March 2015	27 March 2015	0	0	0	0	—	
El Dakhleya SC	24 May 2016	4 August 2016	4	2	0	2	50.0	
Total			326	104	109	113	31.9	—

== Honours ==
=== Player ===
Zamalek

- Egyptian Premier League: 1977–78, 1983–84
- Egypt Cup: 1974–75, 1976–77, 1978–79
- October League Cup: 1974
- Egyptian Friendship Cup: 1986
- African Cup of Champions Clubs: 1984, 1986

Egypt

- Palestine Cup of Nations: 1972, 1975

Individual

- Best Playmaker in 1974 African Cup of Nations
- Best Playmaker in 1976 African Cup of Nations
- 7th African footballer of the year by France Football: 1975
- 8th African footballer of the year by France Football: 1977

=== Manager ===
Zamalek

- Egyptian Premier League: 1991–92, 1992–93 (Assistant Manager)

== See also ==
- Football in Egypt
- List of Egyptians
