= Mahfuj Alam =

Bangladeshi activist and former adviser of interim government of Bangladesh

- মাহফুজ আলম
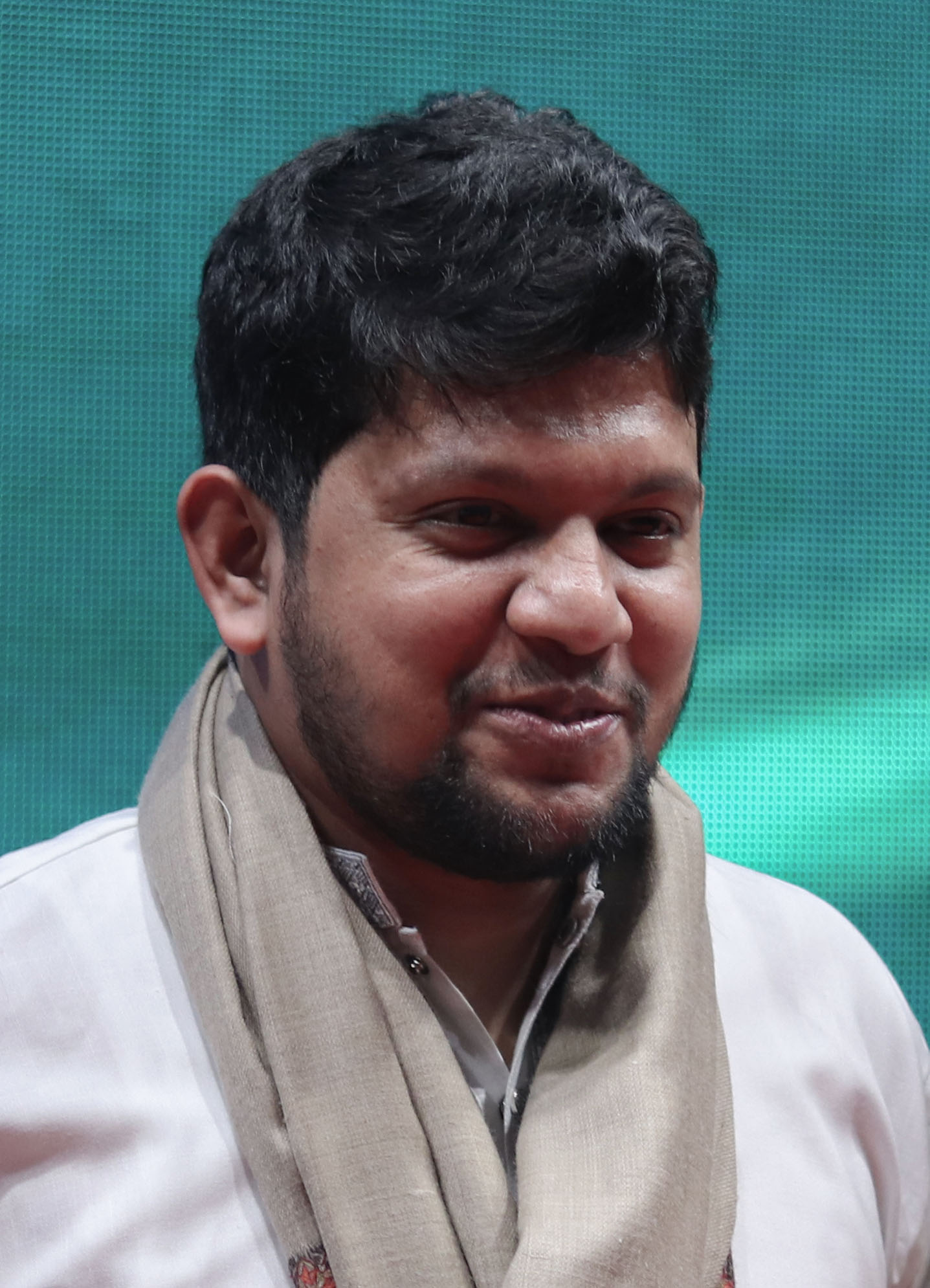
- Alam in 2024

Adviser for Information and Broadcasting
- In office 26 February 2025 – 10 December 2025
- President: Mohammed Shahabuddin
- Chief Adviser: Muhammad Yunus
- Preceded by: Nahid Islam
- Succeeded by: Rizwana Hasan

Adviser of the Interim government
- In office 10 November 2024 – 10 December 2025
- President: Mohammed Shahabuddin
- Chief Adviser: Muhammad Yunus

Special Assistant to the Chief Adviser
- In office 28 August 2024 – 26 February 2025
- Chief Adviser: Muhammad Yunus

Personal details
- Born: April 15, 1994 (age 32) Ramganj, Lakshmipur District, Bangladesh
- Education: University of Dhaka
- Committees: Students Against Discrimination Liaison Committee
- Nickname: Abdullah

Mahfuj Alam (Bengali: মাহফুজ আলম) also known as Mahfuj Abdullah, is a Bangladeshi activist and was a coordinator of the liaison committee of Students Against Discrimination which was involved in the July Uprising. He also served as an adviser of the Ministry of Information and Broadcasting.

== Early life and education ==
Alam was born in 1998 in Narayanpur village, located in the Ramganj Upazila of Lakshmipur district. He completed his SSC (Dakhil) from Gallak Darussunnat Alim Madrasa in Chandpur, and later passed his HSC (Alim) from Tamirul Millat Kamil Madrasa. In the academic year 2015-16, he was a student in the Department of Law at the University of Dhaka.

== Career ==
On 28 August 2024, he was appointed as Special Assistant to the Chief Adviser of the Interim government of Bangladesh.

On 26 February 2025, he was appointed as the adviser to the Ministry of Information and Broadcasting.

== Activism ==
He was the coordinator of the liaison committee of Students Against Discrimination.

On 25 September 2024, while speaking at the Clinton Global Initiative on the sidelines of the 79th session of the UN General Assembly, Chief Adviser Muhammad Yunus, referred to Mahfuj as "the brain of the July Uprising", which culminated in the fall of the Sheikh Hasina's government.

== Personal life ==
Alam is son-in-law of Museh Uddin Madani, lecturer in Peace TV Bangla. He is a translator of Islamic books and co-translated some Islamic books with Abubakar Muhammad Zakaria, waiting to be published. He got married on 18 October 2024.

== Controversies ==
Dipanjan Roy Chaudhury, an editor of the Indian newspaper The Economic Times, claimed that Alam is a former member of the Islamist fundamentalist organization Hizb ut-Tahrir based on fake social media posts. Alam later refuted the claim on Facebook.

== Views ==
On 16 December 2024, he has showed Northeast India and parts of the Indian state of West Bengal as part of Bangladesh in an image shared on a Facebook post that was later deleted and faced a statement of protest by the Ministry of External Affairs, while declaring the need for "a new geography and system". Alam also claimed that the cultures of Northeast India and Bangladesh have been suppressed by "Hindu extremists" and "anti-Bengal attitude" of the upper-caste Hindus. Indian commentators saw it as a part of the Greater Bangladesh concept, Harshil Mehta, an editor of the Indian newsportal News18, commented that Alam's 'statement represents a direct threat to India’s sovereignty and hints at demographic changes through the persecution of Hindus.'

== See also ==
- Nahid Islam
- Asif Mahmud
