= Special Assistant to the Chief Adviser =

Special Assistant to the Chief Adviser (Bengali: প্রধান উপদেষ্টার বিশেষ সহকারী), also referred as Chief Adviser's Special Assistant, Chief Adviser's Envoy, and High Representative to the Chief Adviser are positions in the Government of Bangladesh that were created to assist the chief adviser during the interim government of Mohammad Yunus. The special assistant helps the Chief Adviser in issues such as defence, international affairs and more. During the Interim government, several people were assigned into this role with different status. The special assistant to the Chief Adviser held the status of Secretary, Senior Secretary and Adviser (equivalent to Minister in elected government). These Special Assistants works at Chief Adviser's Office.

== List of special assistants to the chief adviser ==
Name	Official Title	Status Equivalent to	Date of Appointment	Date of Termination	Career Highlight
Ali Imam Majumder	Special Assistant to the Chief Adviser (in media and informal setting) Adviser, Chief Adviser's Office (in website) Attached to the Chief Adviser's Office (in official document)	Adviser	16 August 2024	10 November 2024	Former Cabinet Secretary
Abdul Hafiz	Special Assistant to the Chief Adviser on Defence and National Solidarity Development	Adviser	22 August 2024	17 February 2026	Retired Lieutenant General of Bangladesh Army
Mahfuj Alam	Special Assistant to the Chief Adviser (till 9 November 2024 and in media/informal setting) Adviser, Chief Adviser's Office (in website) (from 10 November 2024)	Secretary (till 9 November 2024) Adviser (from 10 November 2024)	28 August 2024	26 February 2025	Liaison Committee Coordinator of Anti-Discrimination Students Movement
Lutfey Siddiqi	Special Envoy on International Affairs to the Chief Adviser	Adviser	4 September 2024	17 February 2026	Professor in Practice, London School of Economics and Political Science Adjunct Professor, National University of Singapore
Khalilur Rahman	High Representative to the Chief Adviser on Rohingya Issue and Priority Matters (till 8 April 2025) National Security Adviser and High Representative to the Chief Adviser on Rohingya Issue (from 9 April 2025)	Adviser	19 November 2024	17 February 2026	Former Head of Economic, Social and Development Affairs of Executive Office of the Secretary-General of the United Nations Member, Board of Trustees, East West University
Monir Haidar	Spacial Assistant to the Chief Adviser on Consensus Building	Senior Secretary	6 February 2025	17 February 2026	Journalist
Ali Riaz	Special Assistant to the Chief Adviser	Adviser	13 November 2025	17 February 2026	Political scientist and Writer Distinguished Professor, Department of Politics and Government, Illinois State University Head of Constitutional Reform Commission
