= Monirul Islam =

Monirul Islam (Bengali: মনীরুল ইসলাম) is a Bengali masculine given name of Arabic origin. It may refer to:

- Monirul Islam (artist) (born 1943), Bangladeshi-Spanish artist
- Manirul Islam (Bangladeshi politician) (born 1952), Barisal politician
- Kazi Monirul Islam Manu (born 1952), Dhaka politician
- Monirul Islam Tipu (1956–2021), Narail politician
- Sheikh Muhammad Monirul Islam (born 1958), Bangladesh Army major general
- Manirul Islam Sarkar (1965–2017), MLA of Phulbari
- Monirul Islam (politician) (born 1960), MLA of Labpur
- Monirul Islam (cricketer) (born 1980), cricketer
- Monirul Islam (police officer) (born 1970), police officer
- Manirul Islam (Indian politician), MLA of Farakka

== See also ==
- Mohammad Monirul Islam (disambiguation)
- Monir (disambiguation)
- Islam (name)
