= Munira Mosli =

Saudi Arabian plastic works artist and painter (1954–2019)

- Born: Munira Ahmed Muhammad Mosli; July 1954; Mecca, Saudi Arabia
- Died: January 2019 (aged 64); Jeddah, Saudi Arabia
- Citizenship: Saudi Arabia
- Education: Faculty of Fine Arts, Alexandria University
- Occupations: Plastic artist; Painter
- Years active: 1968–2019

Munira Ahmed Muhammad Mosli (Arabic: منيرة موصلي; July 1954 – January 2019) was a Saudi Arabian plastic works artist and painter. She worked with the materials copper, natural dyes, palm tree fibre, plants, paper, papyrus, and oysters and employed the collage technique. Mosli worked on events inspired by Arab world events, human archaeology, music, nature, poetry and the whole universe. She exhibited her works in the Arab world and worked for the Arab Gulf Programme for the United Nations Development Programme in 1994. An art gallery in Saudi Arabia was directed to be renamed after Mosli following the death of the artist.

== Biography ==
In July 1954, Mosli was born in Mecca, Saudi Arabia. She began drawing at an early age. Mosli held her first exhibition of her plastic works with her colleague Safia bin Zaqer at the School of Modern Education in 1968, and her first private exhibition followed four years later in her grandmother's city of Jeddah. She studied in primary and high schools in Lebanon, and at middle school in Egypt. She graduated from Cairo's Faculty of Fine Arts, Alexandria University in 1974, and went on to continue her studies in the United States, graduating with a diploma in Graphic Design five years later; she exhibited her works in a joint exhibition held in California in 1976. In 1979, following her graduation, she began working for the Saudi Arabian national oil company Aramco in the publication designs of its public relations department as a specialist. Mosli designed the Earth and Nasi poster for the Research and Studies Centre in the Dominican Republic in 1990, which was published and distributed worldwide for UNESCO libraries to display on International Women's Day in 1992. Mosli was chosen to become a technical specialist in the contribution of the artistic and media programmes of the Arab Gulf Programme for the support of the United Nations Development Programme in 1994.

Three years later, she held an exhibition called Al-Wasiti and I at the Alam Al-Fann Gallery in Beirut. Mosli focused on painting from 2003, and she established the Art Festival in Khobar in 2007. Mosli was conferred the Order of Merit by the Ministry of Culture of Lebanon during the exhibition in November 1997. Two years later, she held a series of exhibitions in Riyadh known as Children of Gaza and went on to conduct with the artists Youssef Ahmed of Qatar and Iraq's Ahmed Al-Bahrani a joint exhibition at the Bait Muzna Gallery in the Oman capital of Muscat in 2011. In the same year, Mosli's exhibition called The State of Art Now at the Albareh Art Gallery was inspired by her meeting a 14-year-old girl assaulted and then murdered by soldiers during the Iraq War ended. She held exhibitions at the Hafez Gallery, the Art Dubai exhibition and the Jeddah Art Festival in 2016. Mosli won various other awards from Arab and international art bodies and institutions and her works were featured in technical studies published in Arab and local newspapers.

== Artistry ==
She was inspired by events occurring in the Arab world, human archaeology, music, nature, poetry and the whole universe. Mosli tested a wide variety of materials and tried the ones to select the materials suited to her idea. The materials she used included copper, natural dyes, palm tree fibre, plants, paper, papyrus, and oysters and employed the collage technique.

== Death ==
She died after suffering from a prolonged incurable illness of the kidneys in January 2019. Mosli was buried in Jeddah's Ruwais Cemetery.

== Legacy ==
She was considered by the media to be the pioneer of non-traditional plastic art in Saudi Arabia. Al Arabiya said Mosli "contributed to the development of the fine art movement, especially among women," and Abdulrahman Al-Suleiman of Al Yaum calls her "an important artist whose artistic leadership is real and her name means the Saudi woman in her modernity, sophistication and originality as well as in her cultured artistic level". Badr bin Abdullah bin Mohammed bin Farhan Al Saud, the Saudi Minister of Culture, directed one of the art galleries in the nation be named after Mosli.
