= Taha Basry =

Egyptian footballer (1946–2014)

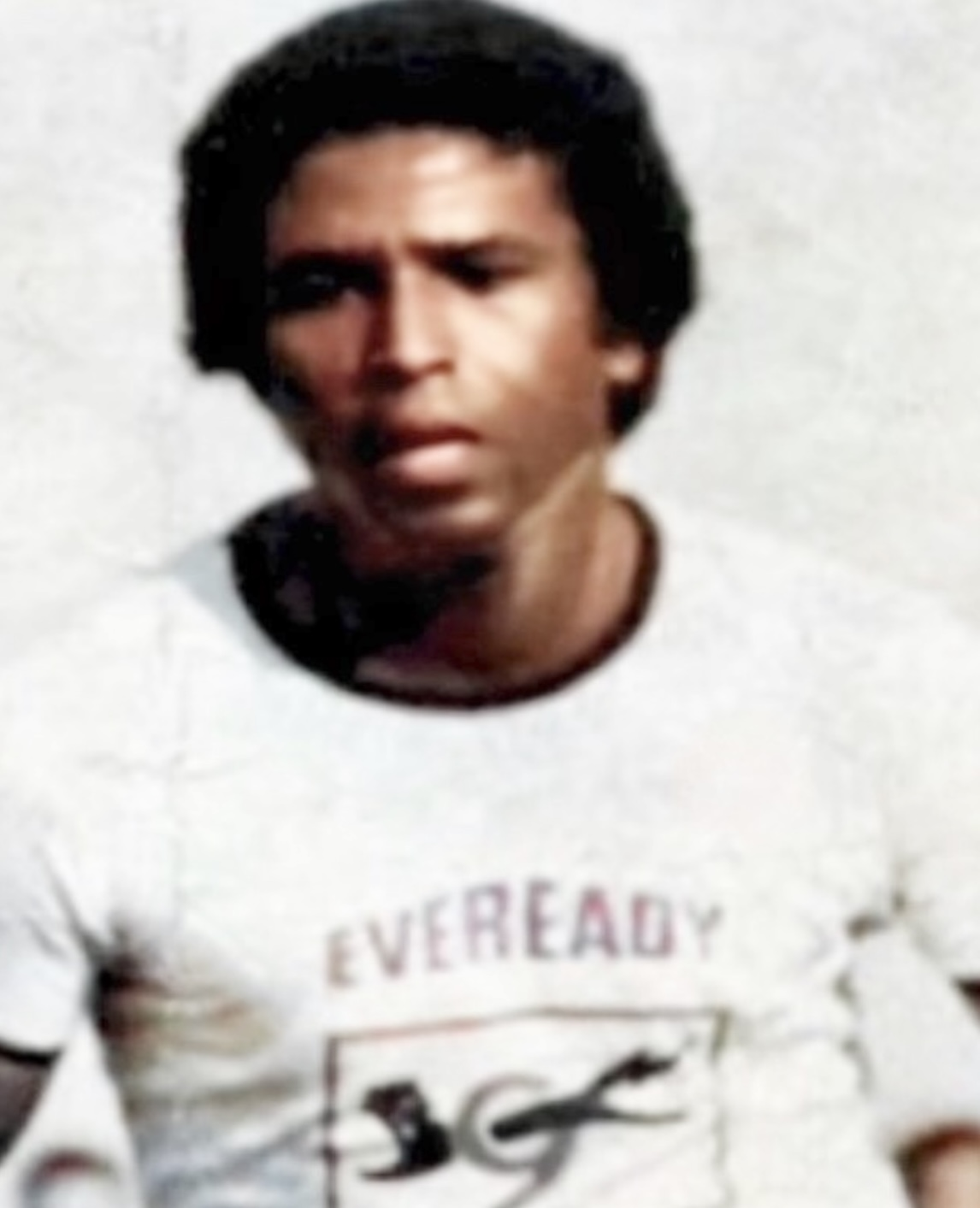
- Basry in 1970

Personal information
- Full name: Taha Basry Bekheit Mokhtar
- Date of birth: 2 October 1946
- Place of birth: Gabal El-Asfar, Kingdom of Egypt
- Date of death: 2 April 2014 (aged 67)
- Place of death: Cairo, Egypt
- Position: Midfielder

Senior career*
Years	Team	Apps	(Gls)
1965-1970	Zamalek		
1970-1974	Al-Arabi SC		(21)
1974-1978	Zamalek		(19)

International career
1966–1978	Egypt	44	(9)
	Kuwait military national football team	?	(2)

Managerial career
- 2001–2006: ENPPI
- 2006–2007: Moqaweloon
- 2007: Ismaily
- 2008–2009: Al-Ittihad
- 2009–2010: Itesalat
- 2010–2011: Annajma
- 2011–2012: Petrojet
Medal record
Men's football
Representing United Arab Republic
Africa Cup of Nations
Third place	1970 Sudan
Representing Egypt
Africa Cup of Nations
Third place	1974
- * Club domestic league appearances and goals

Taha Basry (Arabic: طه بصري; 2 October 1946 – 2 April 2014) was an Egyptian professional football player and manager.

== Early life ==
Taha Basry Bekheit Mokhtar was born on October 2, 1946 in the village of El-Gabal El-Asfar, Qalyubiyya, near the capital Cairo. He comes from a middle class family, with Upper Egyptian roots from southern Aswan. In the fields of El-Gabal El-Asfar, Taha Basry emerged as one of the football talents.

== Playing career ==
=== Club career ===
Taha Basry joined the youth teams of Zamalek in the late 1950s. He played all of his youth career in Zamalek. He showed brilliance in the youth leagues and he was transferred for Zamalek’s first team in the 1965-66 season.

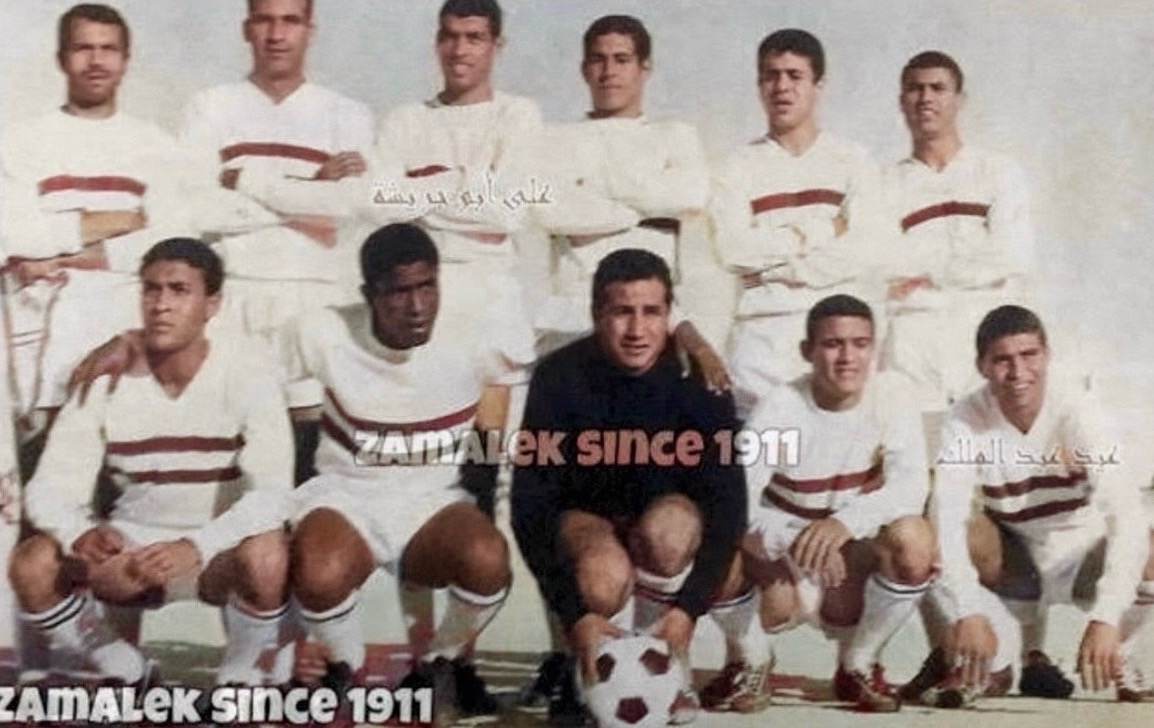
Basry (second sitting from left) with Zamalek in 1969

Basry emerged quickly among his generation in the 1960s. The Egyptian "Eusebio" (nickname by Egyptian audience) performed with excellence in the Zamalek’s match against West Ham United in November 1966, which Zamalek won by a score of 5-1, and Basry scored one goal, while other goals were scored by Hamada Emam (three goals) and Abdel-Karim El-Gohary. He played for two seasons from 1966–67, becoming a key player for the team.

After football activity stopped following the 1967 War. He had spent three seasons with Zamalek between training, friendly matches, and foreign trips, when Ismaily hired him to participate with them in the African Champions League. In 1970-71 season, he obtained the conditional dismissal from Zamalek to play for the Kuwaiti Al Arabi. He played in the AFC Club Championship alongside fellow Egyptian and Zamalek colleague Hassan Shehata. His team won the Emir Cup once and the Kuwait Joint League twice with Al Arabi, and he continued to play in Kuwait until June 1974.

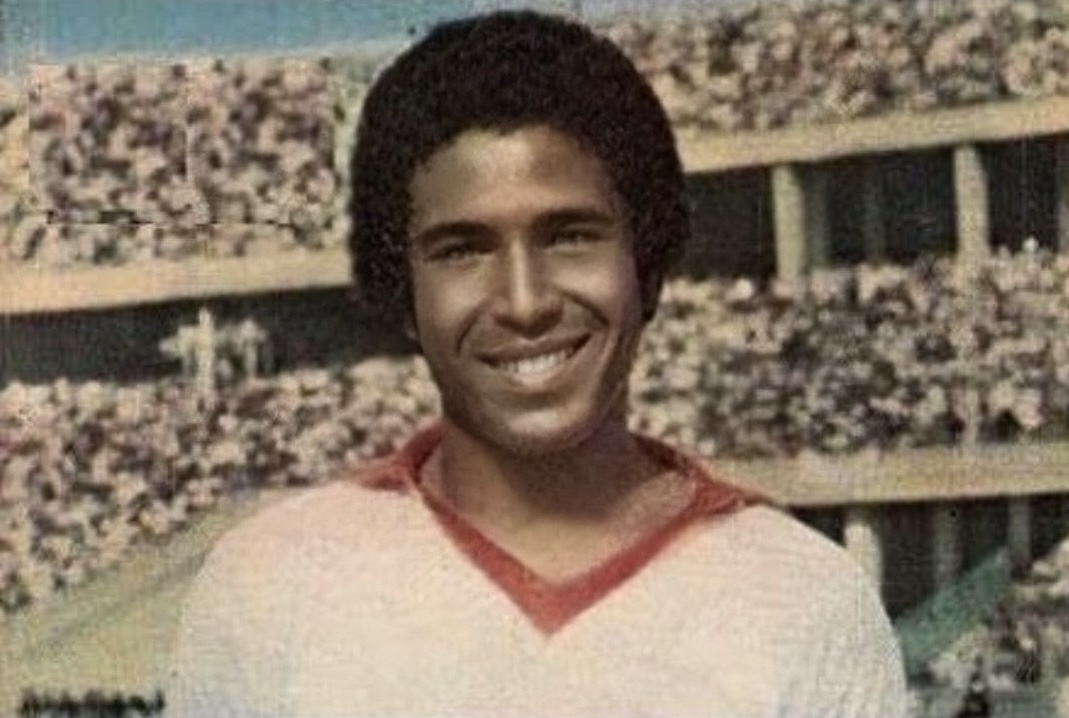
Basry with Zamalek in 1975

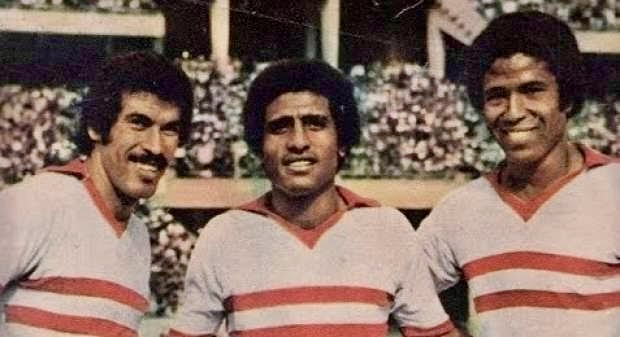
Basry (right) with Zamalek's teammates; Hassan Shehata and Farouk Gaafar

In a press interview, before leaving to join Zamalek, Basry stated:

"The most beautiful goal that I am proud of was with Ismaily on a trip to Tunisia in 1970 against the Espérance Sportive de Tunis, where I scored a hat-trick and I am proud of the third goal for I executed it according to my thinking. There is a goal that I missed and I also regret it with Ismaily in the African Cup of Champions Clubs match against Asante Kotoko S.C., and it was a golden opportunity, and I am sorry because I remembered this goal from an easy ball that was missed. I could have changed the result and Ismaily would have won"

Basry was among an unlucky generation of Egyptian football, since their career was short in Egyptian domestic competitions. Football activity was stopped due to War of Attrition, however, after the Yom Kippur War, the football competitions were resumed in Egypt, when the Egyptian midfielder signed for Zamalek in May 1974. He played for four seasons, and scored 19 goals in the Egyptian League. He scored for Zamalek almost 30 goals in all competitions. He won with Zamalek the Egyptian Premier League (1977–78), and the Egypt Cup twice in (1974–75, 1976–77).

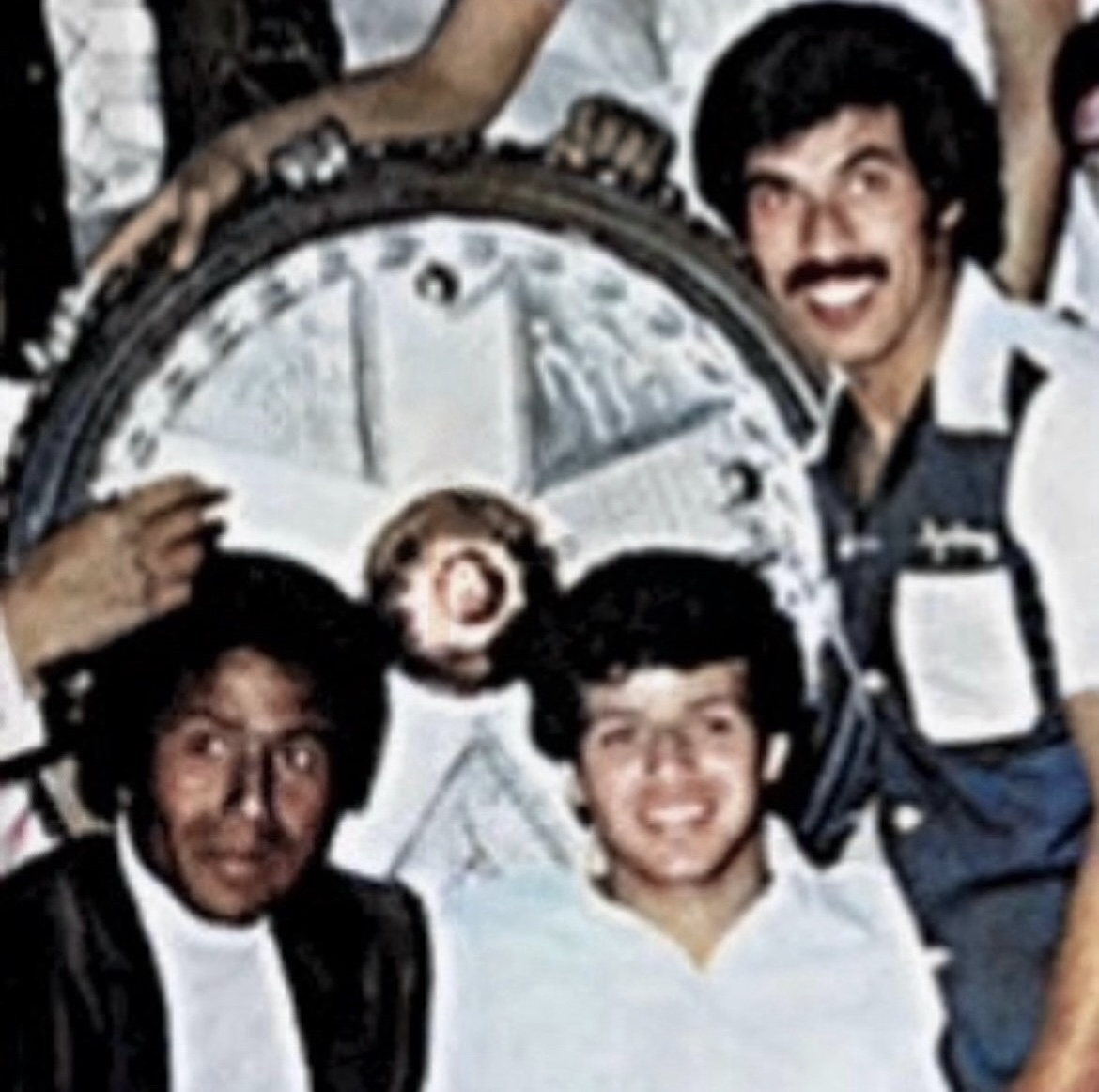
Zamalek players; Basry (left), Hassan Shehata and Mohamed Salah with the Egyptian Premier League trophy in 1978

Basry was distinguished by his powerful shooting, mastery of head kicks, and exemplary athleticism, but the most important thing that distinguished him throughout his career was his upright character. He never objected to a referee or assaulted one, or a colleague. Basry retired from professional football in 1978.

=== International career ===
Basry played for Egypt at the first time in 1966. He represented his country until his retirement from football, one of his most memorable matches was against Morocco in the 1972 African Cup of Nations Qualifiers in Cairo in 1971, and Egypt won by a score of 3-2. He played for his country in the 1970 African Cup of Nations and Egypt finished in third place.

In the 1974 African Cup of Nations, which was held in Egypt, the hosts finished also in the third place. He was Egypt's captain in 1975 Palestine Cup of Nations in Tunisia, which Egypt finished as champions. In the 1976 African Cup of Nations, Basry was captain, and Egypt was ranked fourth. He scored a total of 4 goals in the Africa Cup of Nations. Basry played for Egypt in 44 international caps and scored 9 international goals.

== Managerial career ==
After his retirement, Basry worked as director of football in Zamalek, afterwards, he coached Zamalek and other Egyptian clubs, such as Ghazl El Mahalla, Enppi, El Mokawloon, Ismaily, Al Ittihad Alexandria, Haras El Hodood, Talaea El Gaish, and Petrojet. Working as an assistant coach, Basry was a part of the technical staff of the Egypt national football team that won the 1986 African Cup of Nations. At the youth national team level, Basry led the Egypt national under-17 football team to the 1987 FIFA U-16 World Championship in Canada. He was assistant coach of the first national team that won the 1986 African Cup of Nations in Egypt.

He was the first to lead Enppi after its promotion to the Egyptian Premier league in the 2003 season, and he was able to achieve the league’s biggest surprises this season when he led his team to victory over Al Ahly in the final round of the tournament with a clean sheet, which removed Al Ahly from topping the competition table and gave traditional rivals Zamalek the title. The best honor for him this season was that he received the title of best coach in Egypt, due to his impressive results with the newly promoted team from the second division league, and his career with the team culminated in his leadership to win the Egypt Cup in the 2004-05 season. He was credited as a prominent football figure with high morals.

== Death ==
Basry was transferred to the intensive care unit after undergoing tracheotomy surgery at the International Medical Center. He entered a coma as a result, and his health condition deteriorated. He died at the age of 68 on April 2, 2014.

== Club career statistics ==
Club	Season	League			Cup		Other		Continental		Total	
Club	Season	Division	Apps	Goals	Apps	Goals	Apps	Goals	Apps	Goals	Apps	Goals
Al-Arabi	1970–71	Kuwait Premier League		?		?	—			2 (Note: Goals in AFC Champions League)		?
Al-Arabi	1971–72	Kuwait Premier League		?		?		? (Note: Goals in Kuwait Joint League)	—			?
Al-Arabi	1972–73	Kuwait Premier League		6		?		6 (Note: Goals in Kuwait Joint League)	—			?
Al-Arabi	1972–73	Kuwait Premier League		6		?		? (Note: Goals in Kuwait Joint League)	—			?
Al-Arabi	total			21		6		+6		2		+35

=== Career as manager ===
- Manager of Egyptian national team in 1987 FIFA U-17 World Cup
- Previous manager of Egyptian national team in 1987 FIFA U-17 World Cup
- Previous Manager of Zamalek, Ghazl El Mahalla, ENPPI & Al Moqaweloon Al Arab
- Previous Manager of Ismaily
- Manager of Al-Ittihad Al-Sakndary from 2008 to 2009

== Honours ==
=== Player ===
Al Arabi

- Kuwait Emir Cup: 1971
- Kuwait Joint League: 1971, 1972

Zamalek

- Egyptian Premier League: 1977–78
- Egypt Cup: 1974–75, 1976–77

United Arab Republic

- African Cup of Nations: 3rd place, 1970

Egypt

- African Cup of Nations: 3rd place, 1974
- Palestine Cup of Nations: 1975

=== Manager ===
ENPPI

- Egypt Cup: 2005

Individual

- Best Egyptian Manager 2003 by Egyptian Football Association
