= Emamzadeh Monir =

Emamzadeh Monir امامزاده منير
- Village
- Location within Iran
- Coordinates: 29°54′38″N 51°18′53″E
- Country: Iran
- Province: Fars
- County: Mamasani
- Bakhsh: Mahvarmilani
- Rural District: Mahur

Population (2006)
  - Total: 13
- Time zone: UTC+3:30 (IRST)
  - Summer (DST): UTC+4:30 (IRDT)

Emamzadeh Monir (Persian: امامزاده منير, also Romanized as Emāmzādeh Monīr and Emāmzādehmonīr) is a village in Mahur Rural District, Mahvarmilani District, Mamasani County, Fars province, Iran. At the 2006 census, its population was 13, in 4 families.
