= Jeffrey M. Becker =

American microbiologist

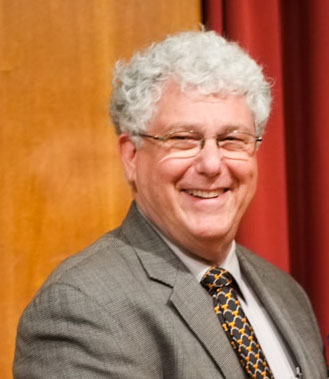
Professor Jeffrey M Becker

Jeffrey Marvin Becker is an American microbiologist who is a retired faculty member from the University of Tennessee. Becker was the Director of the Graduate Program in Cellular, Molecular, and Developmental Biology from 1979 to 1998, founding director of the UT-ORNL Graduate Program in Genome Science and Technology from 1997 to 2005 and Head of department for the Department of Microbiology from 2003 to 2016. Since 2016, he has been the Chancellor's Professor Emeritus. His primary research interests focus on the structure and function of peptides and their receptors/membrane transport in medical mycology.

== Education and training ==
Becker received a BA from Emory University in 1965 and an MS from Georgia State University in 1970 before obtaining his doctorate from the University of Cincinnati in 1970. After a series of fellowships and training opportunities, including time at the Weizmann Institute (1971–72) and the Center for Disease Control (1973), he joined the faculty at the University of Tennessee Knoxville as an assistant professor (1973). He became full professor in 1976.

== Research ==
Becker has co/authored more than 250 papers. His first paper, "Irreversible Inhibition of Biotin Transport in Yeast by Biotinyl-p-nitrophenyl ester", was published in the Proceedings of the National Academy of Sciences of the USA in 1971. He has published on topics including gene function in the yeast Candida albicans and the PTR family of peptide transporters. One of his NIH grants was renewed continually for 35 years.

Becker was one of the four founders of a biotechnology company in Cambridge, Massachusetts. The research focus of the company was to develop drugs for infectious diseases. That company, Mycopharmaceuticals, Inc., subsequently merged with Millennium Pharmaceuticals.

== Awards and recognition ==
Becker was honored with a NIH Research Career Development Award, was named a UT Chancellor's Research Scholar, received UT's Alexander Prize and was Marshall of the College of Arts & Sciences. Becker was elected as a Fellow of the American Academy of Microbiology and the American Association for the Advancement of Science.

== Personal life ==
Becker has served on the Knoxville Jewish Day School Board of Directors as well as the Board of the East Tennessee Foundation.
