= 1975 Egypt Cup final =

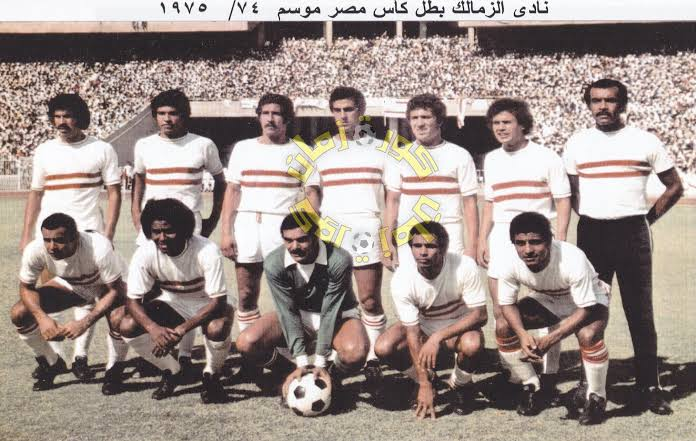
- Event: 1974–75 Egypt Cup
Zamalek	Ghazl El Mahalla
1	0
- Date: 20 June 1975

1975 Egypt Cup final, was the final match of the 1974–75 Egypt Cup, was between Zamalek and Ghazl El Mahalla, Zamalek won the match 1–0.

== Match details ==
20 June 1975

Zamalek	1 – 0	Ghazl El Mahalla
Shehata 71'	Report

Zamalek:
GK	(Egypt) Hesham Azmy
RB	(Egypt) Sami Mansour
CB	(Egypt) Mamdouh Mesbah	(substituted off) ?'
CB	(Egypt) Mohamed Tawfik
LB	(Egypt) Abdel Karim El-Gohary
CM	(Egypt) Farouk Gaafar
CM	(Egypt) Tarek Ghonaim
RW	(Egypt) Taha Basry
AM	(Egypt) Mahmoud El-Khawaga	(substituted off) ?'
FW	(Egypt) Hassan Shehata
FW	(Egypt) Ali Khalil
Substitutions:
DF	(Egypt) Ghanem Sultan	(substituted in) ?'
MF	(Egypt) Helmy Toulan	(substituted in) ?'
Manager:
(Germany) Burkhard Pape

Ghazl El Mahalla:
GK	(Egypt) Abdel Sattar Ali
RB	(Egypt) Mohsen El-Nahriri
CB	(Egypt) Mohamed El-Seyagui
CB	(Egypt) El-Said Abdel Gawwad
LB	(Egypt) Ibrahim Hussein
CM	(Egypt) Ibrahim Youssef
CM	(Egypt) Lotfi El-Shenawi
RW	(Egypt) Tarek El-Seyagui	(substituted off) ?'
AM	(Egypt) Ahmed Abou Ismail
LW	(Egypt) Hanafi Helail	(substituted off) ?'
CF	(Egypt) Abdel Dayem
Substitutions:
MF	(Egypt) Omar Abdullah	(substituted in) ?'
FW	(Egypt) Toto	(substituted in) ?'
Manager:
