= 1977 Egypt Cup final =

- Event: 1976–77 Egypt Cup
| Zamalek | Ismaily |
| 3 | 1 |
- Date: 24 June 1977

1977 Egypt Cup final, was the final match of 1976–77 Egypt Cup, when Zamalek played Ismaily, Zamalek won the game 3–1.

== Route to the final ==
| Zamalek | | Round | Ismaily |
|---|---|---|---|---|
| Opponent | Result | 1976–77 Egypt Cup | Opponent | Result |
| Plastic | 3–0 | First Round |
| Al Ittihad Alexandria | 0–0, 2–1 (Replay) | Quarterfinals |
| ESCO | 1–0 | Semi-finals |

== Game description ==
=== Match details ===
24 June 1977

| Zamalek | 3 – 1 | Ismaily |
|---|---|---|
| Gaafar 45'; Khalil 50', 72' | Report | Abo Greisha 79' |

Zamalek:
| GK | (Egypt) Adel El-Maamour |
| RB | (Egypt) Mohamed Salah |
| CB | (Egypt) Ghanem Sultan |
| CB | (Egypt) Sami Mansour |
| LB | (Egypt) Sabry El-Meniawi |
| CM | (Egypt) Farouk Gaafar |
| CM | (Egypt) Taha Basry |
| RW | (Egypt) Mahmoud El-Khawaga |
| AM | (Egypt) Abdel Rehim Mohamed |
| FW | (Egypt) Hassan Shehata |
| FW | (Egypt) Ali Khalil |
Substitutions:
Manager:
(Egypt) Zaki Osman

Ismaily:
| GK | (Egypt) Mahmoud Hafez |
| RB | (Egypt) Mohamed Abou Amin |
| CB | (Egypt) Mekawi |
| CB | (Egypt) Mohsen Moustafa |
| LB | (Egypt) Ashraf Saber |
| CM | (Egypt) Mohamed Hazem |
| CM | (Egypt) Mohamed Taha | (substituted off) ?' |
| RW | (Egypt) Hassan Mubarak |
| AM | (Egypt) Osama Khalil |
| LW | (Egypt) Ali Abo Greisha |
| CF | (Egypt) Mansour Hafez | (substituted off) ?' |
Substitutions:
| MF | (Egypt) Moustafa Ahmed | (substituted in) ?' |
| FW | (Egypt) Mohamed Abdel Salam | (substituted in) ?' |
Manager:
