= Monir Haidar =

Bangladeshi journalist and writer

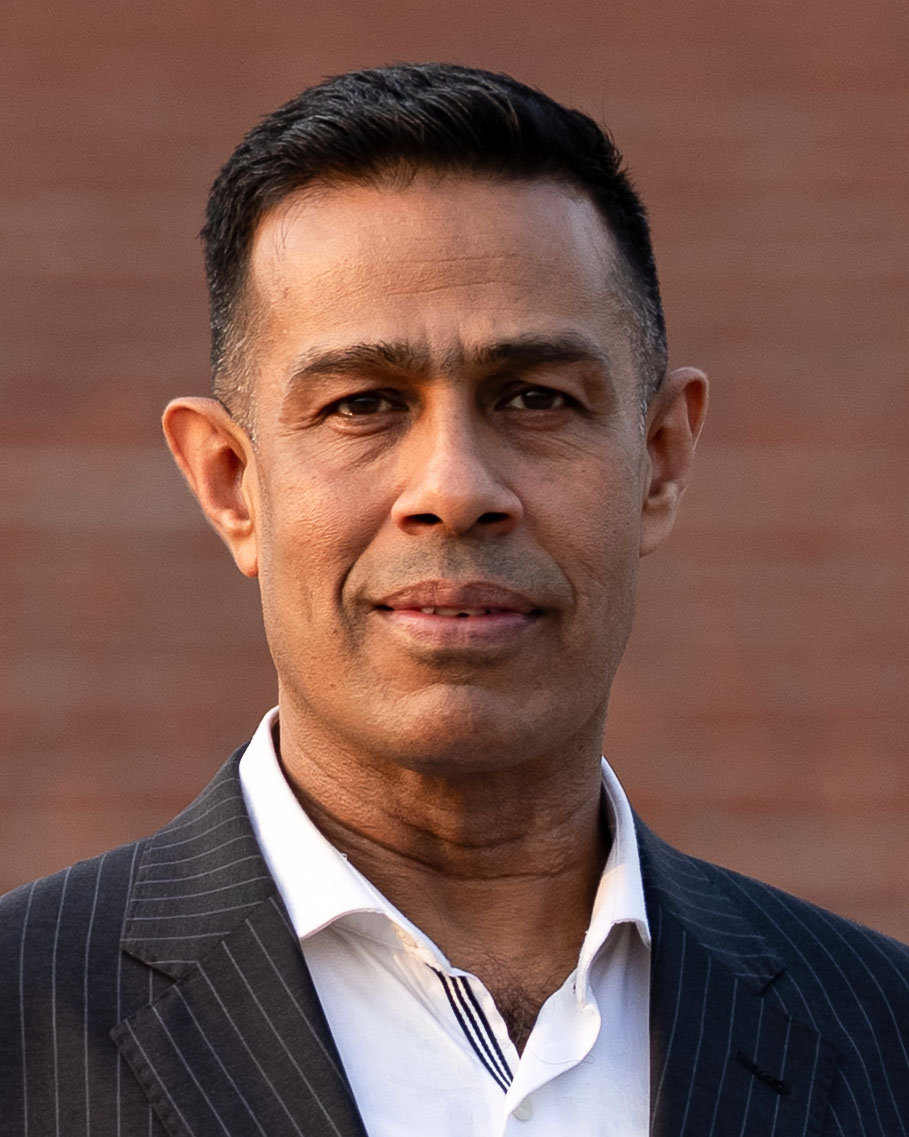
- Haidar in 2026

Special Assistant to the Chief Adviser on Consensus Building
- In office 6 February 2025 – 17 February 2026
- Chief Adviser: Muhammad Yunus

Personal details
- Party: Independent
- Profession: Journalist, writer, political analyst
- Website: monirhaidar.com

Monir Haidar is a Bangladeshi journalist, writer and political analyst. He served as the special assistant to the chief adviser, Muhammad Yunus, in Bangladesh's interim government with the rank of senior secretary.

== Early life ==
Monir Haidar is a resident of Meherpur District, specifically from the Islamnagar village in the Meherpur Sadar Upazila.

Professionally, he is engaged in journalism and media-related work. However, on a personal level, he actively participates in discussions and analysis related to civil rights and political affairs. He is a resident from the United States.

== Career ==
Monir Haidar has been in journalism for nearly three decades. He has worked with newspapers such as Dainik Purbokone, Bhorer Kagoj, Janakantha, Jaijaidin, Ittefaq, and Manabzamin. Currently, he is serving as an advisor at the television channel BanglaVision. Additionally, he is well known as a political commentator.

In March 2012, Haidar expressed concern over a contempt of court rule against Asif Nazrul.

On 5 February 2025, he was appointed as the Special Assistant to the Chief Adviser, with the rank of senior secretary. The appointment was officially announced through a notification issued by the Ministry of Public Administration. He will be responsible for liaising and maintaining communication with various political parties and groups to build national consensus on behalf of the chief adviser.
