= Mohamed Monir (swimmer) =

Egyptian swimmer (born 1984)

Personal information
- Full name: Mohamed El-Zanaty Monir
- Nationality: Egypt
- Born: 1 February 1984 (age 42) Giza, Egypt

Sport
- Sport: Swimming
- Strokes: Open water
Medal record
Men's swimming
Representing Egypt
World Championships
| Bronze medal – third place | 2007 Melbourne | 25 km open water |

Mohamed El-Zanaty Monir (Arabic: محمد منير ش الزناتى; born 1 February 1984 in Giza) is an Egyptian swimmer, who specialized in an open water marathon. He represented his nation Egypt at the 2008 Summer Olympics, and has claimed a bronze medal in the 25 km open water race (5:19:23.23) at the 2007 FINA World Championships in Melbourne, Australia.

Mohammad competed as a lone open water swimmer for Egypt in the inaugural men's 10 km marathon at the 2008 Summer Olympics in Beijing. Leading up to the Games, he finished with a nineteenth place time of 1:54:36.4, but managed to pick up the continental spot as Africa's representative at the FINA World Open Water Swimming Championships in Seville, Spain. Farther from the leaders by about ten body lengths, Monir nearly pulled from the end of the field to claim the twentieth spot out of twenty-four entrants in 1:55:17.0, three minutes and twenty-five seconds (3:25) behind eventual gold medalist Maarten van der Weijden of the Netherlands.
