= Burkhard Pape =

German football manager (1932–2024)

Personal information
- Date of birth: 30 October 1932
- Place of birth: Magdeburg, Germany
- Date of death: 1 February 2024 (aged 91)
- Position: Right winger

Senior career*
Years	Team	Apps	(Gls)
- Hannover 96
- VfR Neumünster
- FSV Frankfurt

Managerial career
- 1961: Baden Amateur All-Stars
- 1966–1968: Sierra Leone
- 1968–1972: Uganda
- 1975: Zamalek
- 1975–1977: Egypt
- Sri Lanka
- Thailand
- Papua New Guinea
- Tuvalu
- 1983–1985: Indonesia Youth
- 2000–2001: Tanzania
- * Club domestic league appearances and goals

Burkhard Pape (30 October 1932 – 1 February 2024) was a German professional football player and manager. After a brief playing career as a right winger, Pape became a football coach who spent nearly forty years managing national teams in Africa, Asia, and the Pacific.

== Playing career ==
Born in 1932 in Magdeburg, Pape played as a right winger for Hannover 96, VfR Neumünster and FSV Frankfurt.

== Coaching career ==
In June and July 1961, Pape managed a German all-star team called the Baden Amateur All-Stars which toured the northeast United States, winning five out of six games.

Pape became manager of Uganda in 1968 after leaving his job coaching Sierra Leone. He left Uganda in August 1972, having won 41 out of the 70 games he had been in charge of. His next big job was as Egypt manager, a position he held from 1975 to 1977.

After leaving Egypt, Pape left Africa and managed teams across several countries Asia and the Pacific, such as in Sri Lanka, Thailand, Papua New Guinea and Tuvalu.

Later in Indonesia, he led the Indonesia Youth team to clinch the Asian Schools Championship title in 1984. He was also member of the coaching staff along with Omo Suratmo and Maryoto to repeat the feat in the same tournament in 1985. He was also technical advisor within the Indonesian federation.

Pape returned to Africa to coach Tanzania at the 2000 Four Nation Castle Lager Cup.

== Death ==
Pape died on 1 February 2024, at the age of 91.
