= 1977–78 Egyptian Premier League =

Egyptian Premier League
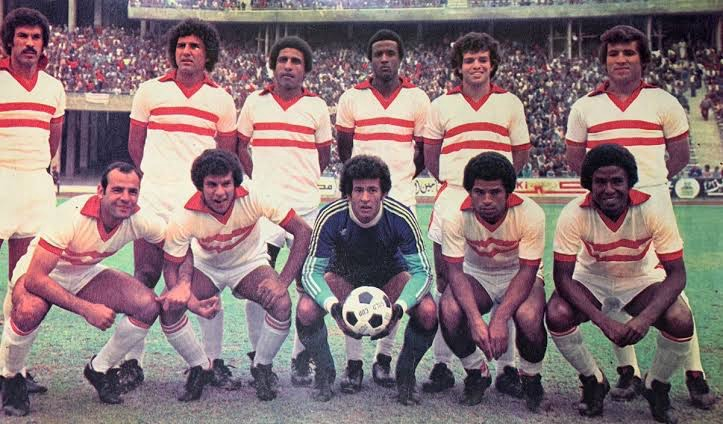
- Zamalek squad that won the 1977–78 season
- Season: 1977–78
- Dates: 16 September 1977 – 2 April 1978
- Champions: Zamalek (4th title)
- Relegated: Esco; El Plastic; Factory 36; Jute Bilbeis
- African Cup of Champions Clubs: Zamalek SC (1st)
- African Cup Winners' Cup: Al Ittihad
- Matches played: 182
- Goals scored: 306 (1.68 per match)
- Top goalscorer: Mahmoud El Khatib (11 goals)

The 1977–78 Egyptian Premier League, was the 21st season of the Egyptian Premier League, the top Egyptian professional league for association football clubs, since its establishment in 1948. The season started on 17 September 1977 and concluded on 2 April 1978. Zamalek won the league for the 4th time in the club's history.

== League table ==
Pos	Club	Pld	W	D	L	F	A	Pts
1	Zamalek (C)	26	18	5	3	41	7	41
2	Al Ahly	26	17	7	2	41	8	41
3	Olympic Club	26	13	7	6	28	22	33
4	Ghazl El Mahalla	26	10	8	8	21	17	28
5	Al Masry	26	9	10	7	20	18	28
6	Al Ittihad	26	9	10	7	19	20	28
7	Ismaily	26	8	11	7	21	17	27
8	Suez	26	10	7	9	20	21	27
9	Tersana	26	9	7	10	18	21	25
10	El Mansoura	26	7	10	9	19	24	24
11	Esco (R)	26	6	10	10	22	28	22
12	El Plastic (R)	26	5	8	14	11	31	16
13	Factory 36 (R)	26	3	9	14	12	26	15
14	Jute Bilbeis (R)	26	3	3	20	14	47	9

(C)= Champion, (R)= Relegated, Pld = Matches played; W = Matches won; D = Matches drawn; L = Matches lost; F = Goals for; A = Goals against; ± = Goal difference; Pts = Points.

== Top goalscorers ==
Rank	Player	Club	Goals
1	(Egypt) Mahmoud El Khatib	Al Ahly	11
2	(Egypt) Ossama Khalil	Ismaily	9
3	(Egypt) Hamdi Nouh	Esco	9
4	(Egypt) Taha Basry	Zamalek	8
5	(Egypt) Hassan Shehata	Zamalek	7

== Teams location ==
Team	Home city
Al Ahly	Cairo
Al Ittihad	Alexandria
Al Masry	Port Said
El Mansoura	Mansoura
El Plastic	Cairo
Esco	Cairo
Factory 36	Cairo
Ghazl El Mahalla	El Mahalla
Ismaily	Ismailia
Jute Bilbeis	Bilbeis
Olympic	Alexandria
Suez	Suez
Tersana	Giza
Zamalek	Giza
