= 1957 African Cup of Nations knockout stage =

Football events in Khartoum, Sudan

In the knockout stage of the 1957 African Cup of Nations, there were two semi-finals scheduled, but South Africa were disqualified for refusing to field a multi-racial team due to apartheid, meaning that Ethiopia were awarded a bye to the final.

The sole semi-final was held in Khartoum on 10 February, and the final was held in Khartoum on 16 February.

== Bracket ==
Semi-finals
10 February – Khartoum
Sudan | 1
Egypt | 2
10 February – Khartoum
Ethiopia | w/o ^{1}
South Africa

Final
16 February – Khartoum
Egypt | 4
Ethiopia | 0

^{1} The second semi-final was cancelled and Ethiopia advanced directly to the final, after South Africa were disqualified for refusing to field a multi-racial team due to apartheid.

== Semi-finals ==
=== Sudan vs Egypt ===
10 February 1957

| Sudan | 1–2 | Egypt |
|---|---|---|
| Al-Bashir 58' | Report | Ateya 21' (pen.); Ad-Diba 72' |

Municipal Stadium, Khartoum
Attendance: 30,000
Referee: Gebeyehu Doube (Ethiopia)

| Sudan | Egypt |

| GK | Faysal Al-Sayed Ahmed Aly |
| DF | Osman Sabahi Babakr 'Osman Dim' |
| DF | Boraî Selim |
| DF | Ibrahim Mohammed Ali 'Ibrahim Kabir' |
| DF | Abbas Al-Hedi Syam |
| MF | Sayed Mostafa Hassan |
| MF | Abdullah Jumaa Zarkan |
| FW | Boraî Bashir |
| FW | Hassan Yousef Hassan 'Abu Al-Aîla' |
| FW | Siddiq Manzul |
| FW | Ibrahim Ali Kheir-Alla 'El-Jak Agab' |
Manager:
Mourad Fahmy

| GK | Paraskos Trimeritis 'Brascos' |
| DF | Nour El-Dali |
| DF | Mosaad Daoud |
| DF | Rifaat El-Fanagily |
| DF | Raafat Attia |
| MF | Samir Qotb |
| MF | Ibrahim Tawfik |
| FW | Mohammed Diab El-Attar (c) |
| FW | Sayed Abou-Bakr "Baidou" |
| FW | Alaa El-Hamouly |
| FW | Mohammed Abdel-Fattah 'Hamdi' |
Manager:

=== Ethiopia vs South Africa ===
10 February 1957

| Ethiopia | w/o | South Africa |

Municipal Stadium, Khartoum

== Final ==
16 February 1957

| Egypt | 4–0 | Ethiopia |
|---|---|---|
| Ad-Diba 2', 7', 68', 89' | Report |

Municipal Stadium, Khartoum
Attendance: 30,000
Referee: Mohammed Youssef (Sudan)

| Egypt | Ethiopia |

| GK | Paraskos Trimeritis 'Brascos' |
| DF | Nour El-Dali |
| DF | Mosaad Daoud |
| DF | Rifaat El-Fanagily |
| DF | Hanafi Bastan |
| MF | Samir Qotb |
| MF | Ibrahim Tawfik |
| FW | Mohammed Diab El-Attar |
| FW | Raafat Attia |
| FW | Alaa El-Hamouly |
| FW | Mohammed Abdel-Fattah 'Hamdi' |
Manager:
Mourad Fahmy

GK
Manager:

Gila-Michael Tekle Mariam
Adale Tekle Selassie
Girmaye Fikre Mariam
Mohammed Ibrahim
Ayele Tessema
Adamu Alemu
Netsere Wolde Selassie
Zewde Samuel
Kebede Metaferia
Asefaw Berhane
Tekeste Goitom
