= Yakan Hussein =

Egyptian footballer (1934–2012)

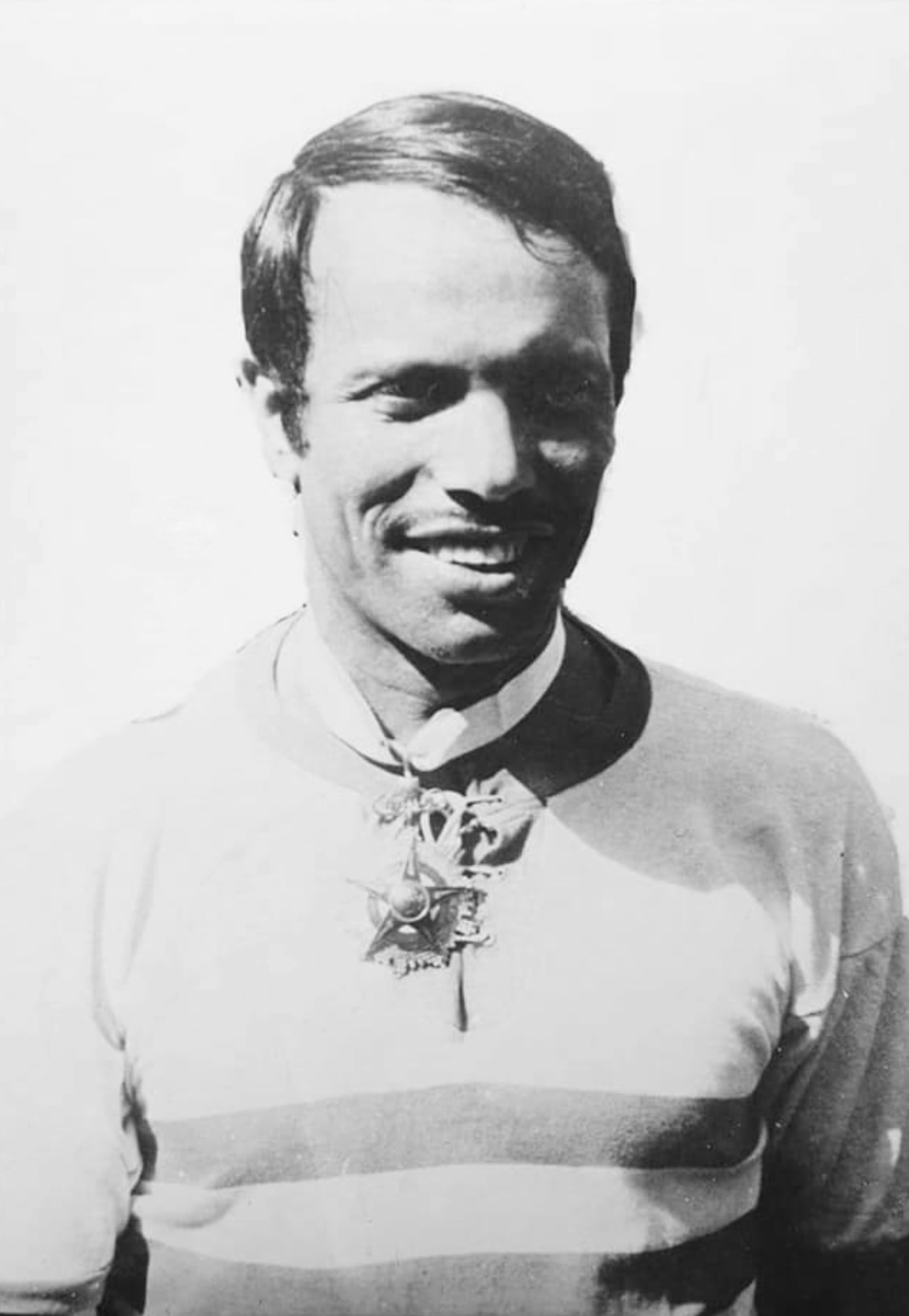

Personal information
- Full name: Yakan Hussein Zaki
- Date of birth: 12 September 1934
- Place of birth: Cairo, Egypt
- Date of death: 22 December 2012 (aged 78)
- Place of death: Cairo, Egypt
- Position: Midfielder

Senior career*
Years	Team	Apps	(Gls)
1951–1953	Al Ahly		
1953–1972	Zamalek		

International career
1953–1969	Egypt	48	(0)
Medal record
Men's football
Representing Egypt
Mediterranean Games
Gold medal – first place	1955
Arab Games
Gold medal – first place	1953
Representing United Arab Republic
Africa Cup of Nations
Winner	1959 United Arab Republic
Third place	1970 Sudan
Arab Games
Gold medal – first place	1965
- * Club domestic league appearances and goals

Yakan Hussein Zaki (Arabic: يكن حسين زكي; 12 September 1934 – 22 December 2012) was an Egyptian football coach and former football player who played as a defensive midfielder. He spent almost his whole career with Zamalek. He played also for the Egypt national football team. He was part of the team that won the 1959 African Cup of Nations. Hussein played for his country at the 1960 and 1964 Summer Olympics. He was part of the team that won the gold medal at the Arab Games in 1953 and 1965. After retiring from football, he worked as a head coach. He was elected as Zamalek's board member in the 1990s.

== Early life ==
Yakan Hussein was born into a well-off family on 12 September 1934 in Khairat Street in Sayyeda Zeinab, Cairo. He had nine brothers and sisters. He played football in the streets of Aswan when his father moved to work in Upper Egypt. It was not long before the family moved again to Sayyida Zeinab after a brief period in the city of Zagazig, Sharqia. His actual beginning came in the secondary school of commerce with the high school team. He then played for the Nubian Youth Club team in the Abdeen neighborhood.

== Career ==
=== Club career ===
In 1951, he was chosen by Al Ahly's coach. He spent two years with the team. In 1953, he moved to Zamalek, where he spent his whole career. During his time with Zamalek, he won the Egyptian Premier League three times in (1959–60, 1963–64, and 1964–65). He also won with Zamalek the Egypt Cup for six times in (1955, 1957, 1958, 1959, 1960, and 1962).

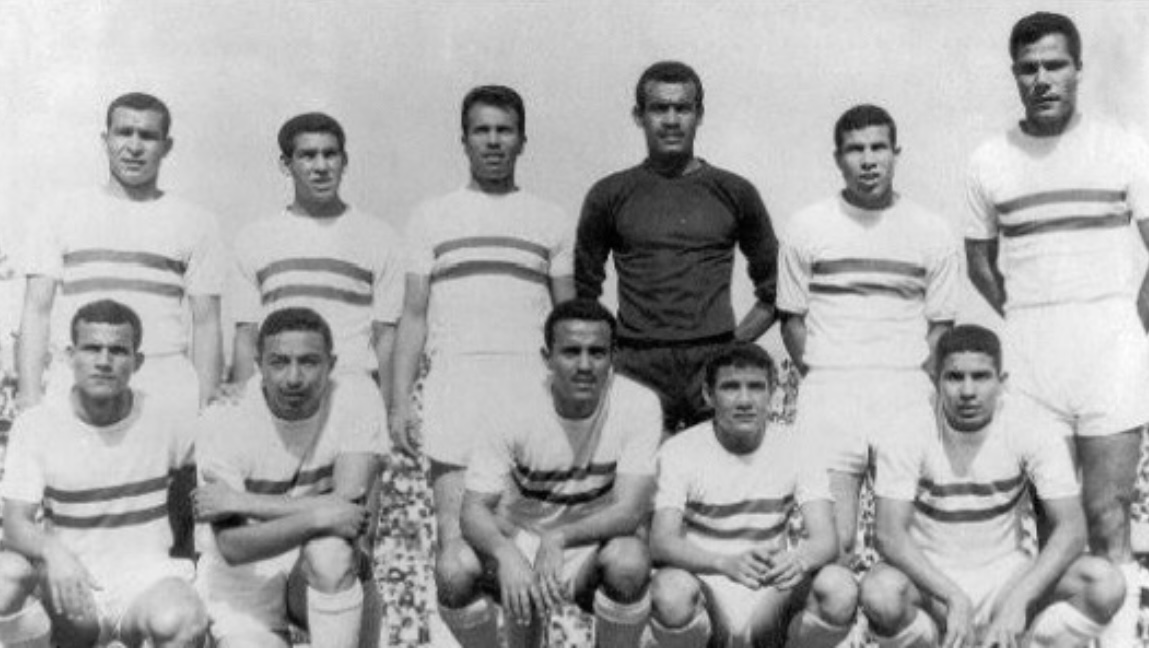
Hussein (third standing from left) with Zamalek in 1964

Hussein was called "King of coverage", for his defensive ability, he was the first full-back to possess the elements of modern football, including extreme speed to intensify attacking, instant rebounds to strengthen defenses, mastery of accurate cross passing to teammates, and powerful shooting with both feet and head to exploit semi-opportunities and turn them into goals. He was honored with the Order of Sports, first class twice, once from President Gamal Abdel Nasser in 1966, and the second from President Anwar Sadat on his retirement day. He retired from professional football in 1972.

=== International career ===
He was also a member of the Egypt national football team between 1953 and 1970 and played 82 caps with 10 goals. He played for his country in the 1953 Arab Games in Alexandria where Egypt won the gold medal. He was also a part of the team that won the gold medal at the 1955 Mediterranean Games in Barcelona.

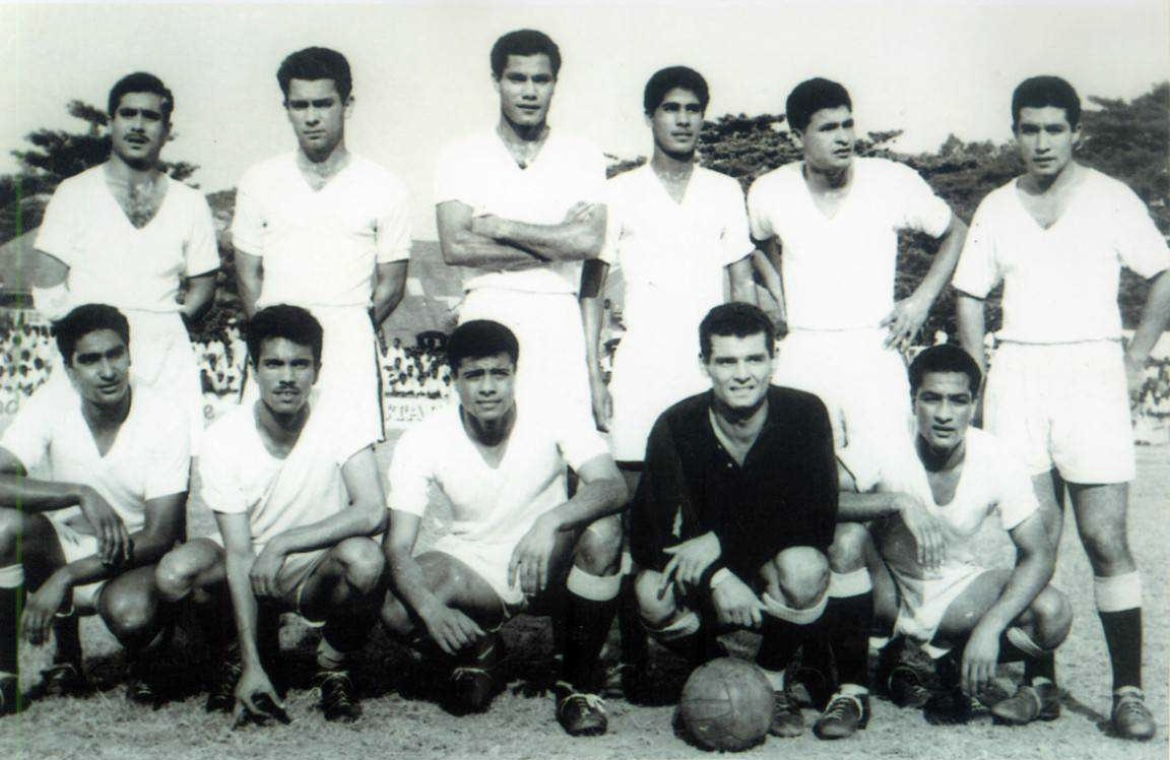
Hussein (front row, second from left) with Egypt in 1959

His most notable appearances were at the 1960 Summer Olympics in Rome, and 1964 Summer Olympics in Tokyo, where Egypt finished fourth. He was also a part of the team that won the gold medal at the 1965 Arab Games in Cairo. Hussein was a part of the team that won the 1959 African Cup of Nations in Sudan.

=== Film career ===
In addition to the fact that he was a star on the field, he was involved in the Egyptian Film Industry and participated in the 1963 film The Belle and the Students, starring Shoukry Sarhan, Shwikar, Hassan Youssef, and Samir Sabry.

=== Coaching career ===
After his retirement from football, he coached football clubs in the Gulf Area for several years, before returning to Cairo in 1983. From 1988 through 1992 he was elected a member of Zamalek's board of directors. His son Hesham Yakan and nephew Ayman Younes both played for Zamalek, and the Egypt national football team.

== Death ==
Yakan Hussein Zaki died on 22 December 2012 at the age of 78 after a long struggle with illness, in Cairo.

== Honours ==
Zamalek SC

- Egyptian Premier League: 1959–60, 1963–64, 1964–65
- Egypt Cup: 1954–55, 1956–57, 1957–58, 1958–59, 1959–60, 1961–62

Egypt

- Mediterranean Games: 1955
- Arab Games: 1953

United Arab Republic

- African Cup of Nations: 1959; 3rd place, 1970
- Arab Games: 1965
