= Hamada Emam =

Egyptian footballer (1943–2016)

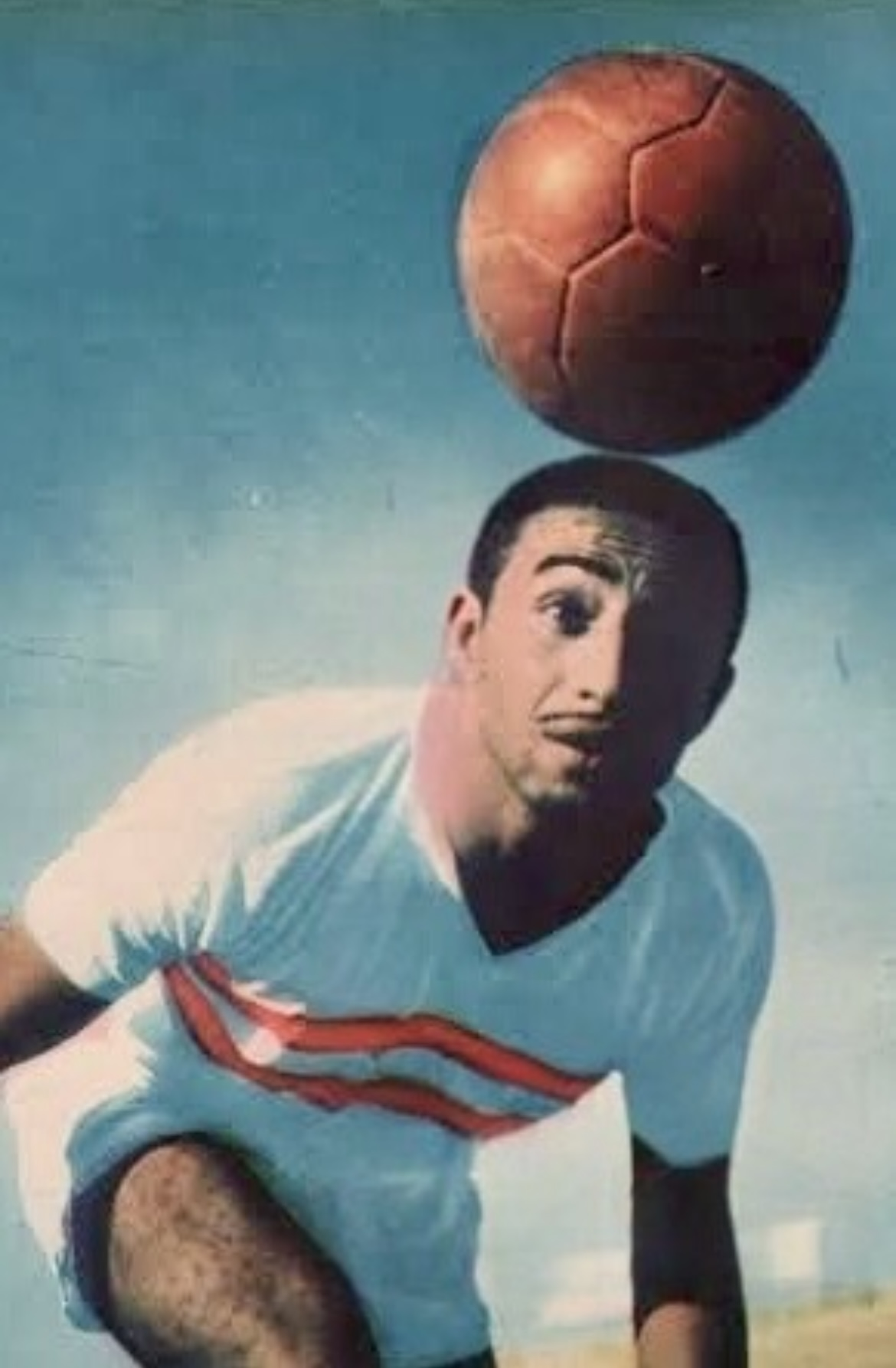
- Emam with Zamalek in 1965

Personal information
- Full name: Mohamed Yehia el-Horria Mohamed Emam
- Date of birth: 28 November 1943
- Place of birth: Cairo, Egypt
- Date of death: 9 January 2016 (aged 72)
- Place of death: Cairo, Egypt
- Height: 1.77 m (5 ft 10 in)
- Position: Forward

Youth career
- Zamalek

Senior career*
Years	Team	Apps	(Gls)
1958–1974	Zamalek	267	(84)

International career
1963–1974	Egypt	5	(3)
Medal record
Men's football
Representing Egypt
Africa Cup of Nations
Third place	1970
- * Club domestic league appearances and goals

Mohamed Yehia el-Horria Mohamed Emam (Arabic: محمد يحيى الحرية محمد إمام; 28 November 1943 – 9 January 2016), known as Hamada Emam (Arabic: حمادة إمام), was the Vice President of the Egyptian Football Association (EFA) and a former Egyptian football player. A prolific goal scorer, he scored 74 goals for Zamalek in the Egyptian Premier League. He was nicknamed "The Fox" by Egyptian fans. Emam spent his entire career with Zamalek, and scored 84 goals for the team in all competitions.

After retirement, Emam worked in sports management. He also worked as a football pundit. He became Zamalek's vice president for more than a period. As a player, Emam is considered as one of the best Egyptian players of all time.

== Early life ==
He was born on November 28, 1943 in the Al-Munira neighborhood of Sayyida Zeinab, adjacent to El-Qasr El-Aini Street in Cairo. His father Yehia Emam was Zamalek and Egypt's legendary Goalkeeper in the 1930s and 1940s. Yehia Emam was a former military officer and vice governor of Gaza in 1954. Hamada Emam graduated from the Egyptian Military Academy, and worked as an officer in the Egyptian Armed Forces and be retired with the rank of Brigadier General. He was married Dr. Maggie Al-Halwani, with whom he has two sons Hazem Emam and Ashraf Imam.

== Career ==
=== Playing career ===
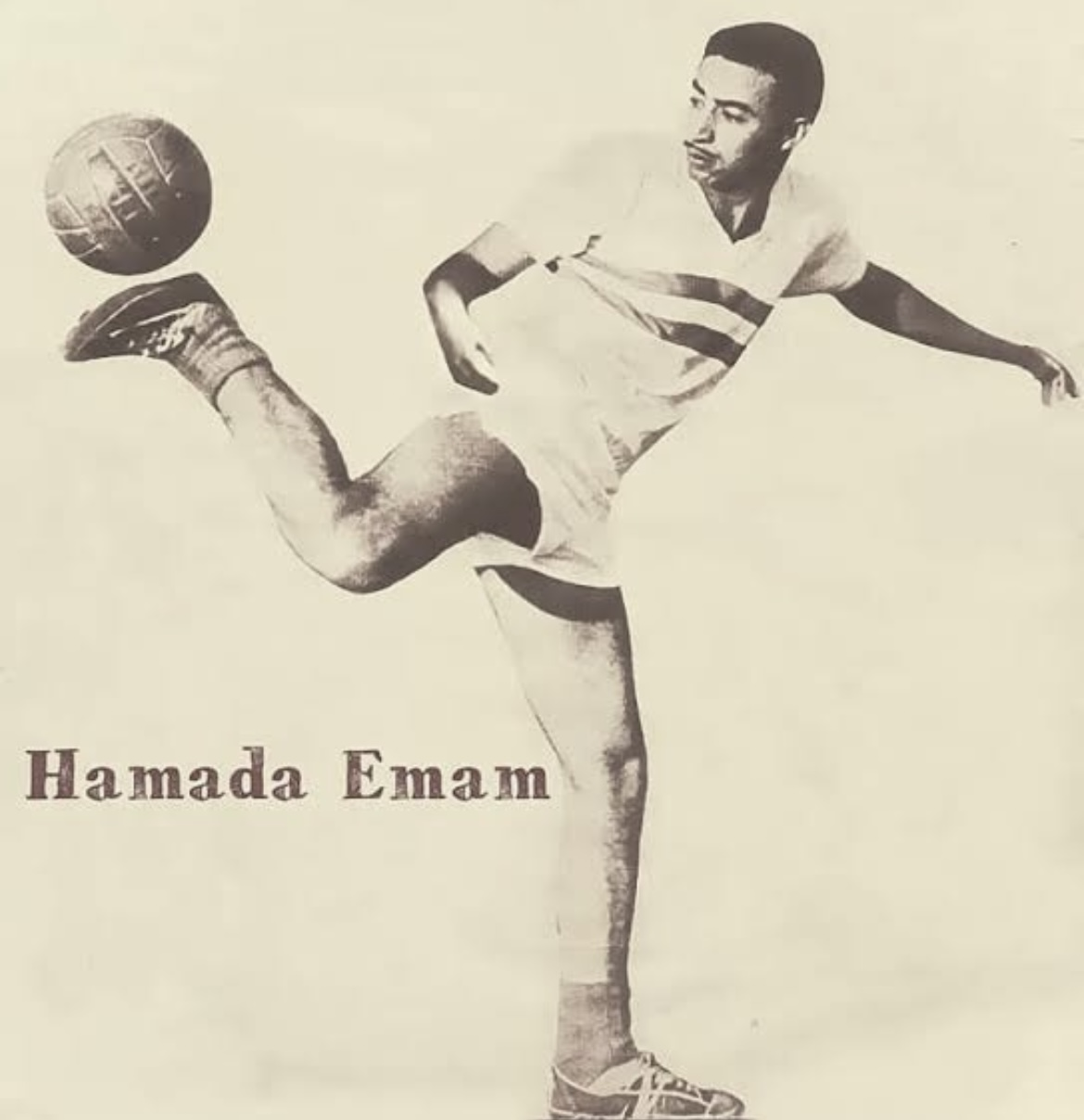
Hamada Emam in 1962

Emam joined the Zamalek youth team in 1957. This happened when youth team coach Ali Sharaf saw him and decided to include him in the club. One of Emam's nicknames was "Mohamed V" and this goes back to a story with Field Marshal Abdel Hakim Amer in 1960, when he was 18 years old. Hamada Imam was then playing with the Zamalek's U-18, and also sometimes plays for the U-20 team. Zamalek U-20 reached the final of the Egypt Cup to meet Al Ahly, and the match ended in a draw, and the Egyptian Football Association decided to hold a rematch between the two sides.

Zamalek wanted to use the services of Hamada Emam in the match, but they discovered that he was with his father in the Gaza Strip, as his father, Yehia Emam, who was also formerly the Zamalek's goalkeeper, was deputy governor of the Gaza Strip and wanted his son to devote himself to studying. Zamalek addressed Field Marshal Abdel Hakim Amer, who was a Zamalek fan himself. Immediately, Amer decided to send a warplane to Gaza that brought Hamada Emam to Cairo. Hamada Emam participated in the match and scored 5 goals, and Zamalek defeated their traditional arch rival with a score of 6–0 and was champion of the Egypt Cup for U-20.

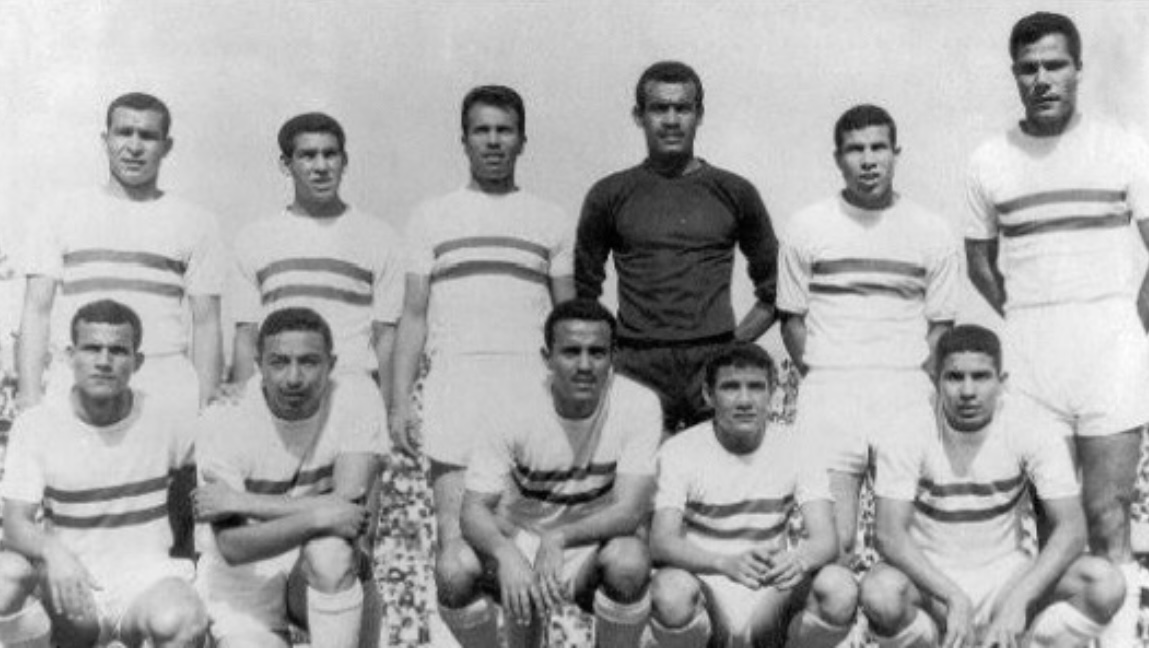
Emam (front row, second from left) with Zamalek in 1964

He joined the first team in the 1958. In the Cairo derby, Emam scored 6 goals (4 in official matches and 2 in friendly games) for Zamalek, and during his career, the team didn't lose from Al Ahly in an official match for over a whole decade, from 1962 to 1973, in all competitions. Among his most famous goals in the derby was the one which he used his intelligence in his goal against Al Ahly, he penetrated from the left side and shot into the near corner to deceive everyone. He was nicknamed the "Fox". He earned this title due to his great intelligence on the field.

In November 1966, Zamalek met West Ham United in a friendly in Cairo, Zamalek won 5–1 and Emam scored a famous hat trick. He won three Egyptian league titles (1959–60, 1963–64, 1964–65). He also won with Zamalek three Egypt cup titles (1957–58, 1958–59, 1959–60, 1961–62).

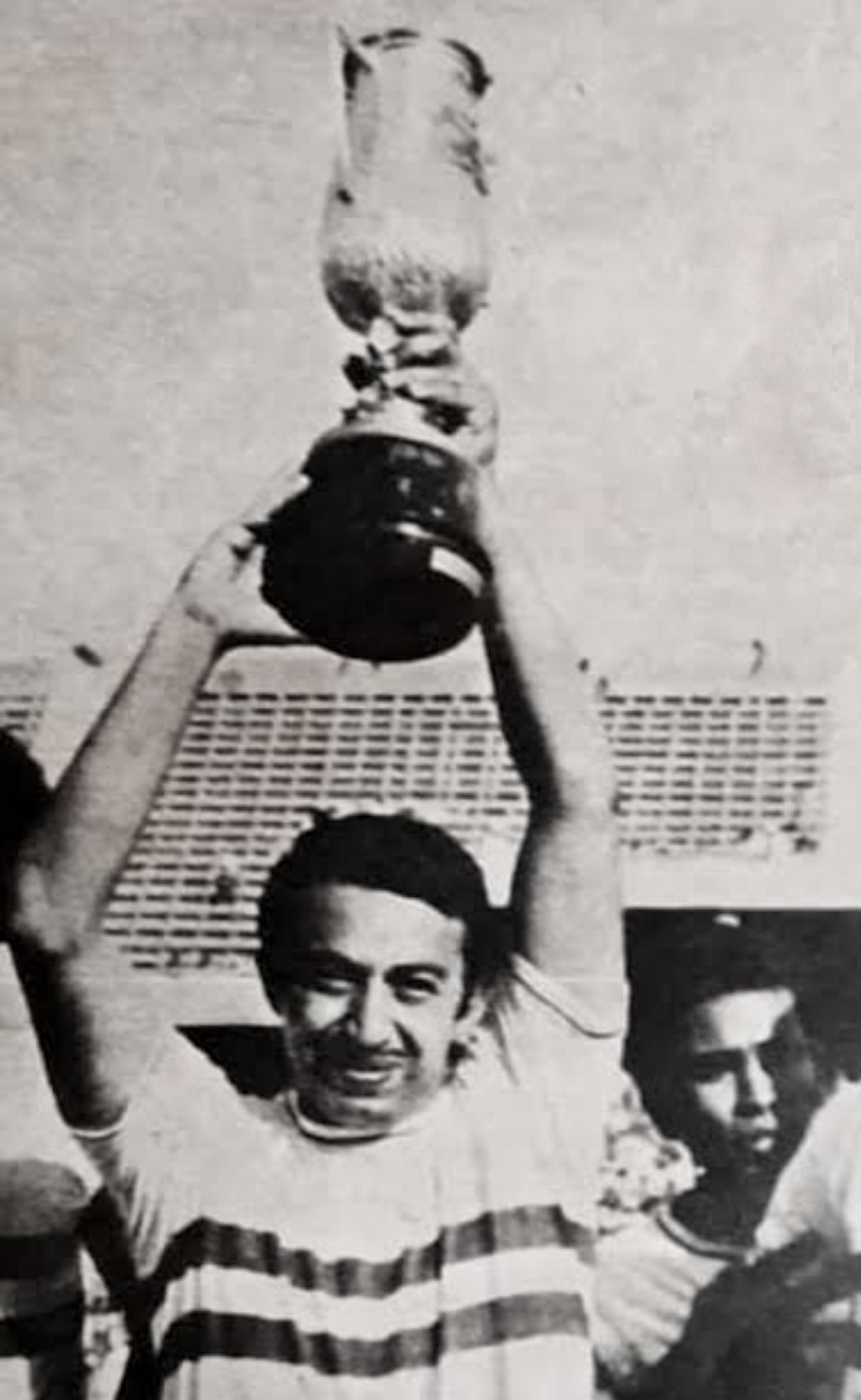
Emam lifting the October League Cup trophy in 1974

Emam was unlucky, as Egyptian football activity stopped due to the outbreak of the 1967 war, he was only 24. The Egyptian League was resumed in 1971, Emam was 28, in the first season of the league's return, Zamalek were near from reaching the title, however, due to a controversial penalty in the 1971–72 league's match between Zamalek and Al Ahly, after Al Ahly complained about the referee, and the season result was canceled. Emam retired after lifting the October League Cup trophy in 1974.

Emam played for the Egypt national football team, but was not a regular member of the starting lineup due to his job as a military officer in the Egyptian Armed Forces. He played for his country in the 1970 African Cup of Nations in Sudan and Egypt finished third. Emam played 5 international caps for Egypt and scored 3 goals.

=== Post retirement career ===
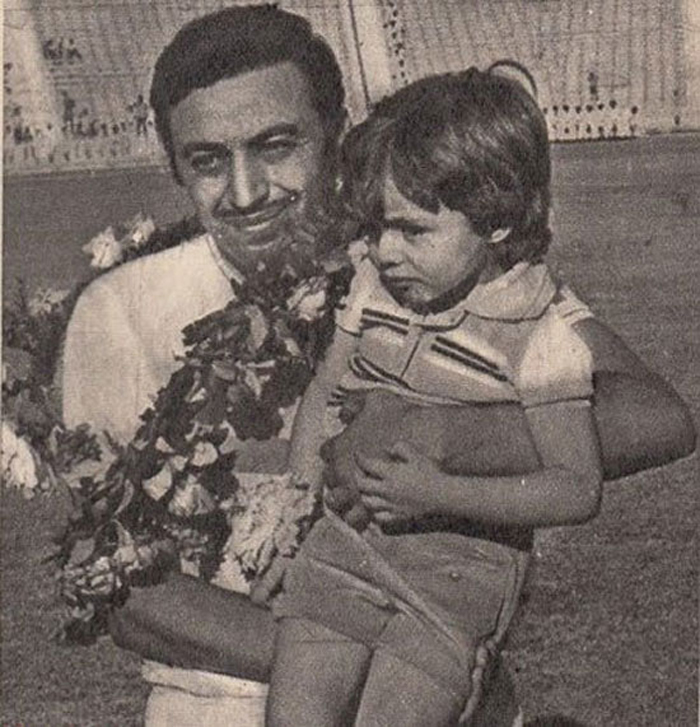
Hamada Emam with his son Hazem Emam, c. 1978

Hamada Emam headed to sports management career, where he worked as sports director in Zamalek, and rose in administrative work until he reached the position of Vice President of the club, also he worked as board member, and vice president of the Egyptian Football Association.

After his retirement, he worked as a sports commentator in Egyptian television for decades, and presented the “Goals of the Week with the Fox” program on the Nile Sports Channel for more than 10 years. Hamada Emam died on 9 January 2016.

== Career statistics ==
Club's league Season	Seasons	Goals
Zamalek	1961–62	6
Zamalek	1962–63	19
Zamalek	1963–64	11
Zamalek	1964–65	18
Zamalek	1965–66	11
Zamalek	1966–67	6
Zamalek	1971–72	3
Zamalek	1972–73	0
Zamalek	1973–74	0
Total	74	

== Honours ==
Zamalek

- Egyptian League: 1959-60, 1963-64, 1964-65
- Egypt Cup: 1958–59, 1959–60, 1961–62
- October League Cup: 1974

Egypt

- Africa Cup of Nations third place: 1970

== See also ==
- List of Zamalek SC players
- 1962 Egypt Cup Final
