= Raafat Attia =

Egyptian footballer (1934-1978)

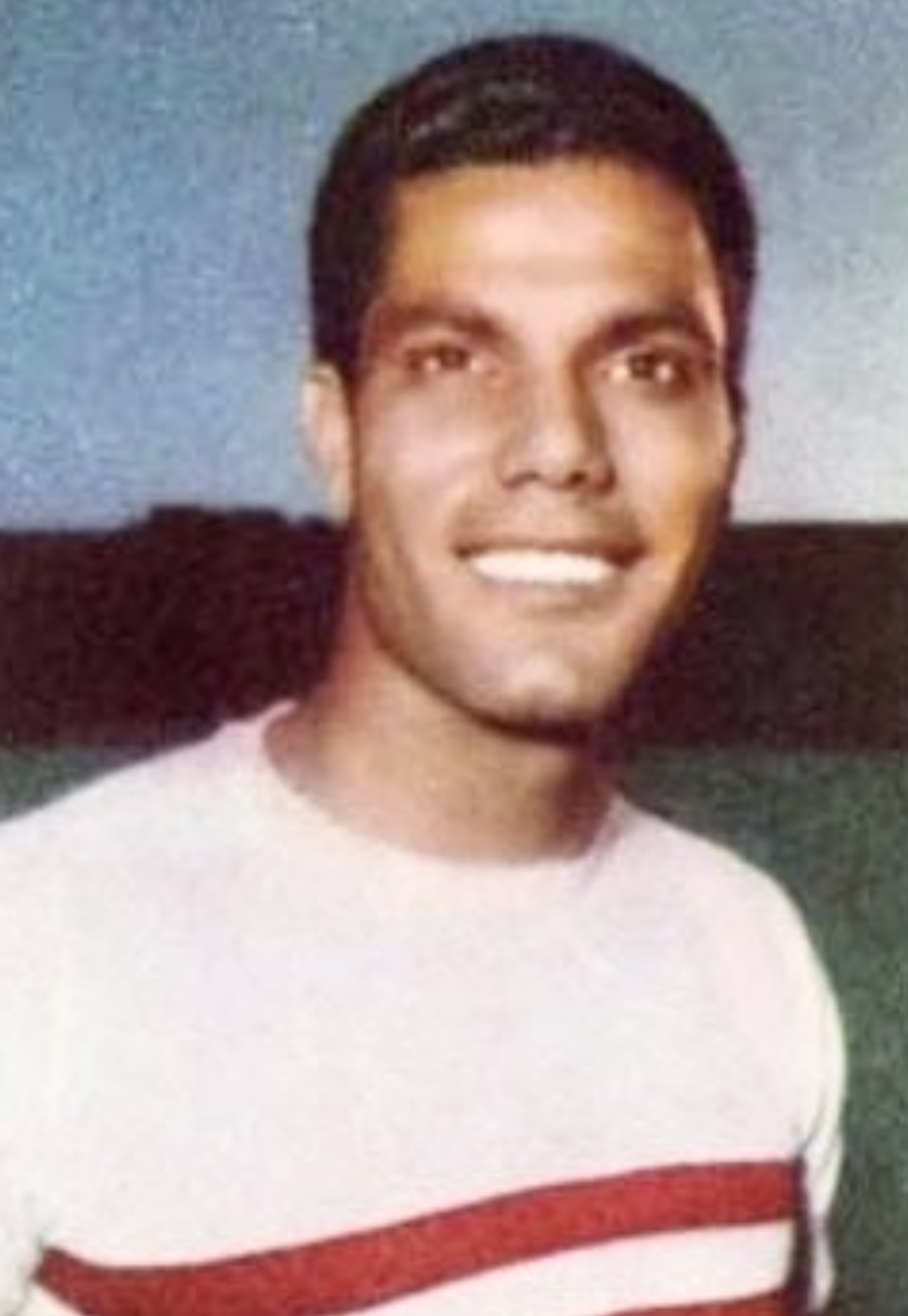
- Attia with Zamalek in 1965

Personal information
- Full name: Raafat Ateya Helmy
- Date of birth: 6 February 1934
- Place of birth: Egypt
- Date of death: 21 July 1978 (aged 44)
- Position: Forward

Senior career*
Years	Team	Apps	(Gls)
1952–1957	Al Ittihad Alexandria		
1957–1967	Zamalek		

International career
1955–1964	Egypt	46	(8)

Managerial career
- 1976–1977: Al-Wehda
Medal record
Men's Football
Representing Egypt
Africa Cup of Nations
Winner	1957 Sudan
Mediterranean Games
Gold medal – first place	1955
Representing United Arab Republic
Africa Cup of Nations
Runner-up	1962 Ethiopia
- * Club domestic league appearances and goals

Raafat Attia Helmy (Arabic: رأفت عطية حلمي, 6 February 1934 – 21 July 1978) was an Egyptian professional footballer who played as a forward for Zamalek and the Egypt national team.

== Biography ==
Attia started his career with Al Ittihad in 1952, he moved for Zamalek in 1957, he played for Zamalek for 10 years, and for the rest of his career. He won with Zamalek three Egyptian League titles in (1959–60, 1963–64, and 1964–65) and the Egypt Cup for four times (1958, 1959, 1960, and 1962).

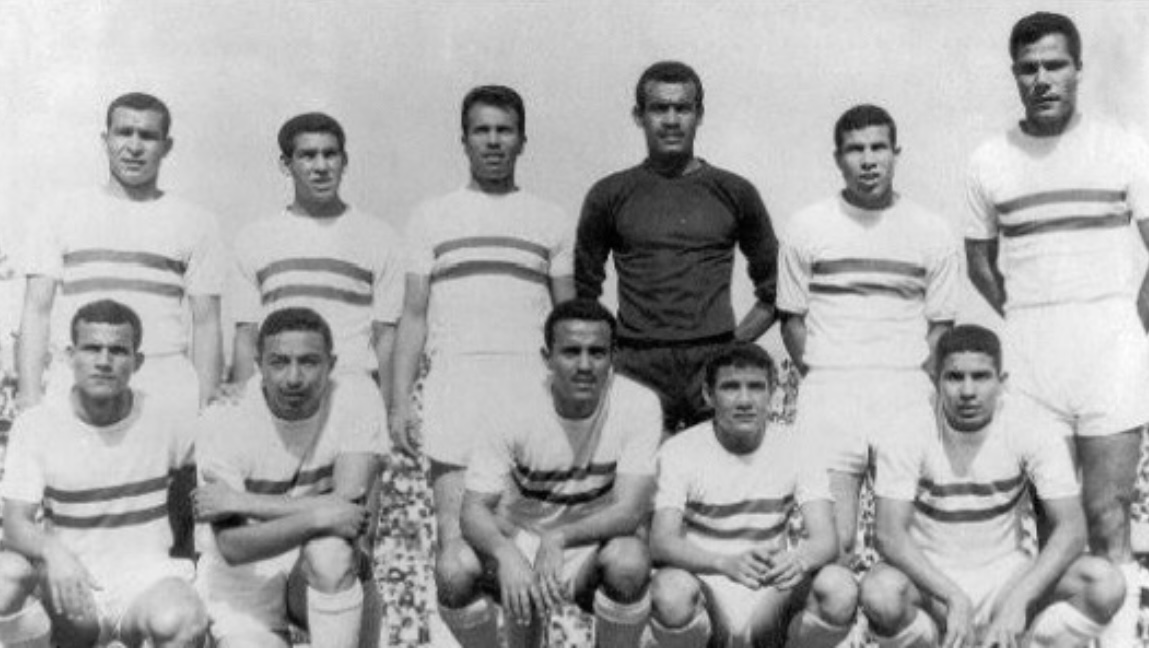
Attia (first standing from right) with Zamalek in 1964

He played for the Egyptian national team, Attia was part of the team that won the gold medal at the 1955 Mediterranean Games in Barcelona. He was a part of the team that won the 1957 African Cup of Nations title where he scored the first ever goal in the tournament’s history. Although he missed the 1959 edition, he returned in the 1962 edition, when Egypt were runner-ups. He also represented his country in the 1960 and 1964 Summer Olympics, where Egypt finished fourth in the tournament.

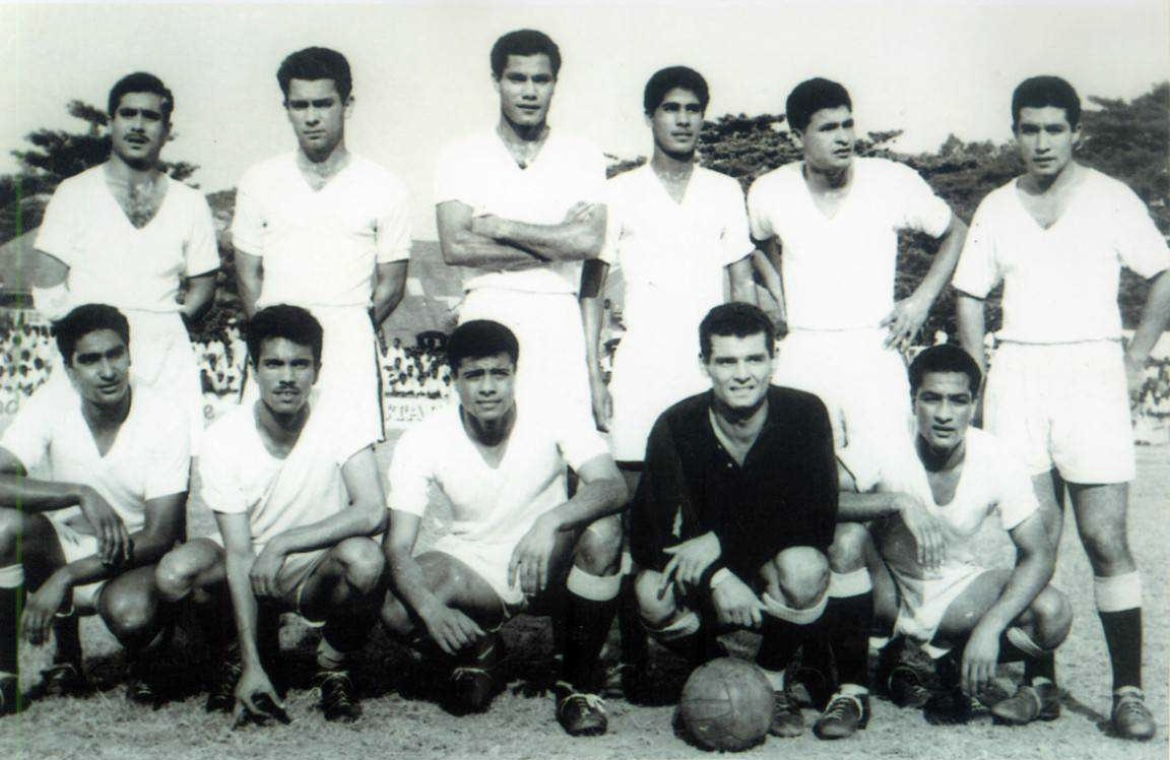
Attia (third standing from left) with Egypt in 1959

After his retirement from football, he worked as a manager for a brief period. Attia worked in Saudi Arabia and managed the Saudi Arabian League football club Al-Wehda in the 1976–77 season.

Raafat Attia died relatively young, at the age of 44 in a car accident, in 1978.

== Honours ==
Zamalek

- Egyptian Premier League: 1959–60, 1963–64, 1964–65
- Egypt Cup: 1957–58, 1958–59, 1959–60, 1961–62

Egypt

- African Cup of Nations: 1957
- Mediterranean Games: 1955

United Arab Republic

- African Cup of Nations: runner-up, 1962
