= Alaa El-Hamouly =

Egyptian footballer (1930-1984)

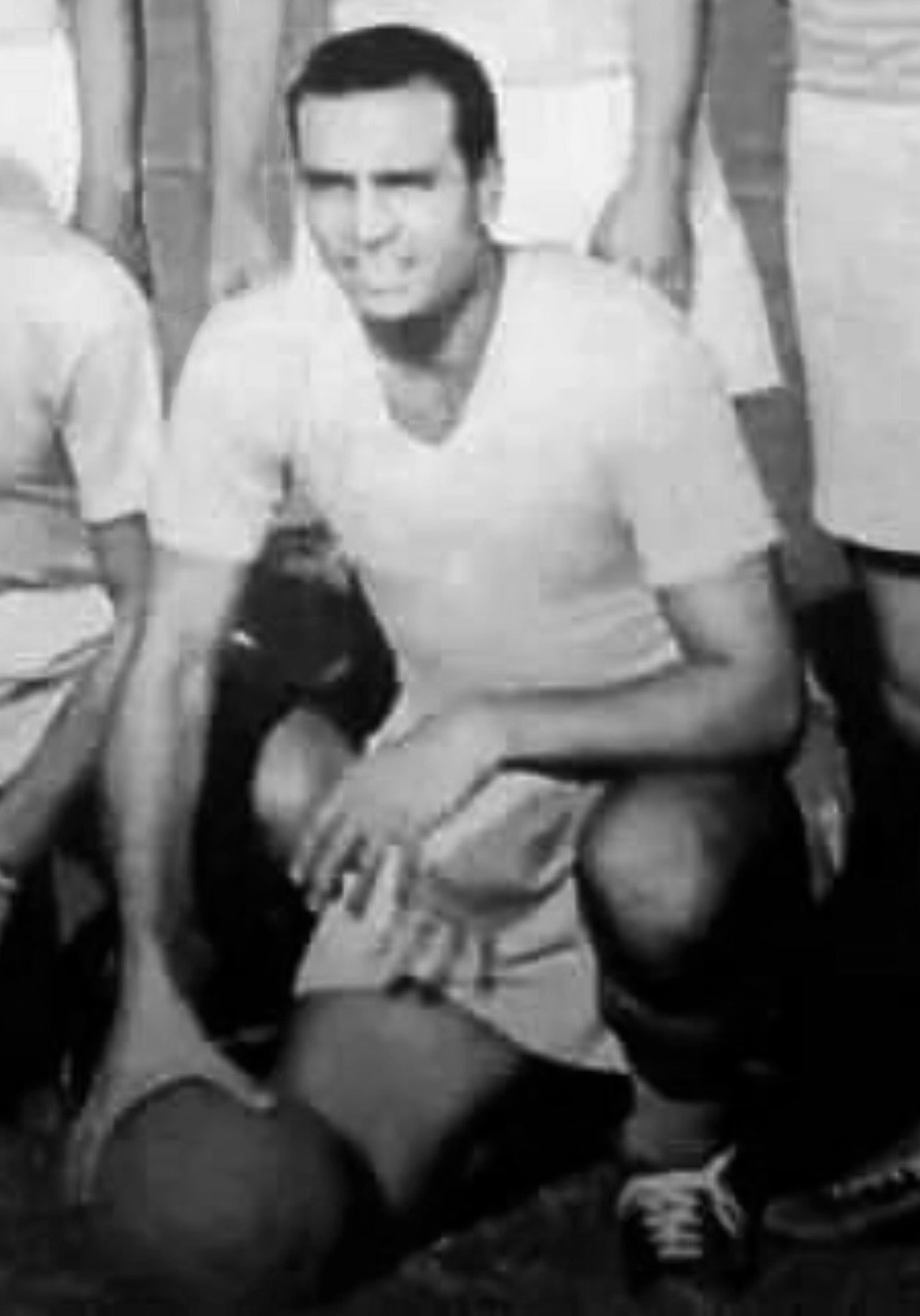
- El-Hamouly with Zamalek in 1959

Personal information
- Full name: Alaa El-Din Hassanin El-Hamouly
- Date of birth: 4 July 1930
- Place of birth: Cairo, Egypt
- Date of death: 13 January 1984 (aged 53)
- Place of death: Cairo, Egypt
- Position: Forward

Senior career*
Years	Team	Apps	(Gls)
1949-1962	Zamalek		

International career
1950-1960	Egypt		
Medal record
Men's football
Representing Egypt
Africa Cup of Nations
Winner	1957 Sudan
Mediterranean Games
Gold medal – first place	1955 Barcelona
Representing United Arab Republic
Africa Cup of Nations
Winner	1959 United Arab Republic
- * Club domestic league appearances and goals

Alaa El-Din Hassanin El-Hamouly (Arabic: علاء الدين حسنين الحامولي; 4 July 1930 – 13 January 1984) was an Egyptian footballer who played as a forward for Zamalek. He also played for the Egyptian national team, and he was part of the squad that won the 1957 and 1959 African Cup of Nations. A prolific goal scorer, he scored 91 goals for Zamalek in all competitions. El-Hamouly represented his country in the 1952 and 1960 Summer Olympics. After his retirement, he worked as a football commentator on Egyptian television.

== Biography ==
Alaa El-Din Hassanin El-Hamouly was born on 4 July 1930 in Cairo. He played in his youth in Al Ahly before joining Zamalek in the prime of his professional career. El-Hamouly started his professional career in 1949. He played all of his career in Zamalek and was a talented goal scorer. As part of the Zamalek team, he won the Egypt Cup seven times: in 1952, 1955, 1957, 1958, 1959, 1960, and 1962.

While El-Hamouly was on the Zamalek team, they won the Cairo League three consecutive times (1950–51, 1951–52, 1952–53). Zamalek also won the 1959–60 Egyptian Premier League title, the first Egyptian league title for El-Hamouly's club. He is Zamalek's all-time top scorer of the Egypt Cup with 23 goals, and Zamalek's 3rd all-time top scorer of the Cairo derby with 9 goals, after Mostafa Taha (12 goals) and Abdel-Karim Sakr (10 goals).

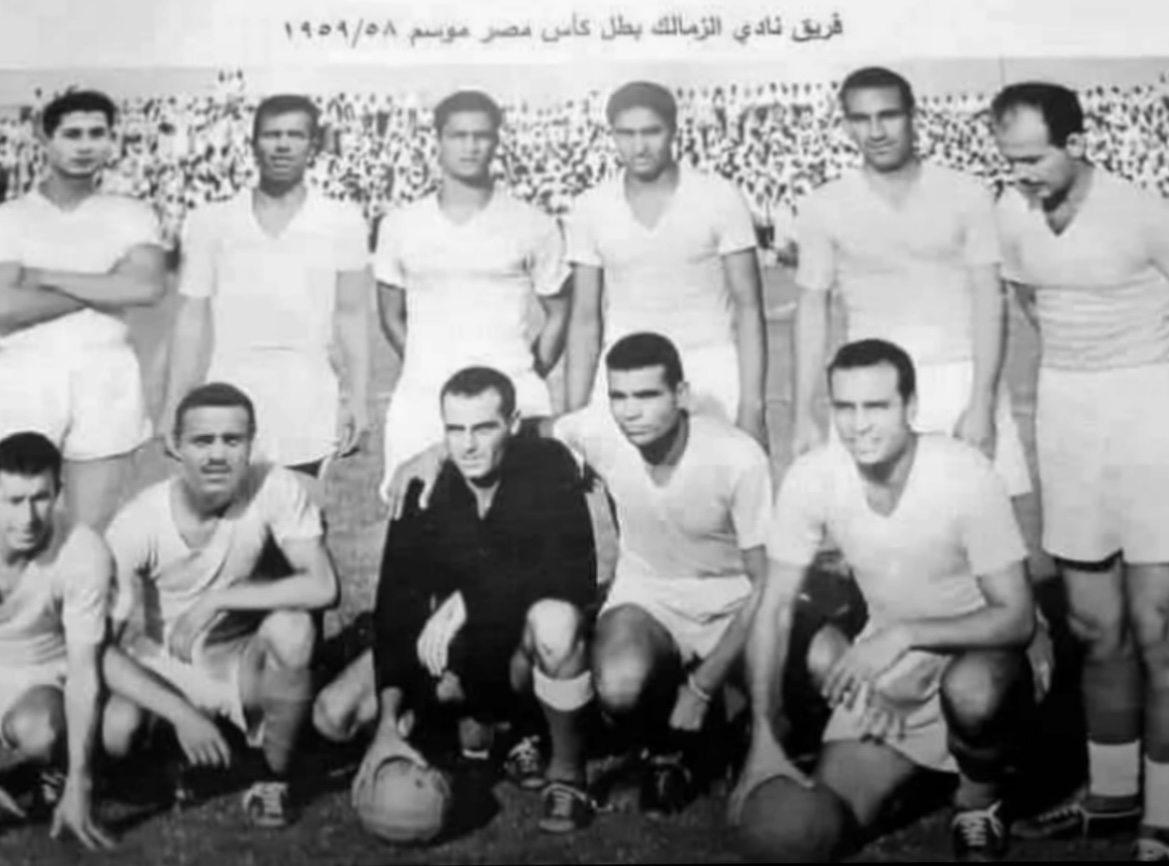
El-Hamouly (front row, first from right) with Zamalek in 1959

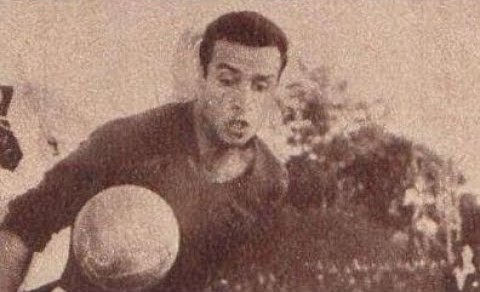
El-Hamouly with Egypt in the 1950s

El-Hamouly played for almost a decade on the Egypt national football team. His first international match was in 1950. He and his team represented Egypt at the 1951 Mediterranean Games in Alexandria and won the silver medal. El-Hamouly was also part of the team that won the gold medal at the 1953 Arab Games in Alexandria.

His team won the gold medal at the 1955 Mediterranean Games in Barcelona, and the 1957 African Cup of Nations and the 1959 African Cup of Nations. He also represented his country in the 1952 Summer Olympics in Helsinki and 1960 Summer Olympics in Rome.

After his retirement, El-Hamouly worked in the field of football commentary, and he was one of the most prominent football pundits on Egyptian television in the 1970s and 1980s. He died on 13 January 1984, aged 53, in Cairo.

== Honours ==
Zamalek

- Egypt Cup: 1951–52, 1954–55, 1956–57, 1957–58, 1958–59, 1959–60, 1961–62
- Cairo League: 1950-51, 1951–52, 1952–53
- Egyptian Premier League: 1959-60

Egypt

- African Cup of Nations: 1957
- Mediterranean Games: 1955

United Arab Republic

- African Cup of Nations: 1959
