= Kenya at the Africa Cup of Nations =

Kenya has participated in the Africa Cup of Nations six times, making Kenya one of the more experienced East African teams in the competition. Despite this, Kenya has never advanced past the group stages of a single AFCON.

== Competitive history ==
Year	Round	Position	Pld	W	D*	L	GF	GA
(Sudan) 1957 to (United Arab Republic) 1959	Not affiliated to CAF							
(Ethiopia) 1962 to (Sudan) 1970	Did not qualify							
(Cameroon) 1972	Group stage	5th	3	0	2	1	3	4
(Egypt) 1974 to (Libya) 1982	Did not qualify							
(Ivory Coast) 1984	Did not enter							
(Egypt) 1986	Did not qualify							
(Morocco) 1988	Group stage	8th	3	0	1	2	0	6
(Algeria) 1990	Group stage	8th	3	0	1	2	0	3
(Senegal) 1992	Group stage	9th	2	0	0	2	1	5
(Tunisia) 1994	Did not qualify							
(South Africa) 1996	Withdrew							
(Burkina Faso) 1998 to (Mali) 2002	Did not qualify							
(Tunisia) 2004	Group stage	11th	3	1	0	2	4	6
(Egypt) 2006 to (Gabon) 2017	Did not qualify							
(Egypt) 2019	Group stage	17th	3	1	0	2	3	7
(Cameroon) 2021	Did not qualify							
(Ivory Coast) 2023	Disqualified due to FIFA suspension							
(Morocco) 2025	Did not qualify							
(Kenya) (Tanzania) (Uganda) 2027	Qualified as co-hosts							
Total	Group stage	7/36	17	2	4	11	11	31

== Participation history ==
- – Win
- – Draw
- – Lose

#	Year	Stage	Date	Opponent	Result
1	(Cameroon) 1972	Group stage	23 February 1972	Cameroon	1–2
1	(Cameroon) 1972	Group stage	26 February 1972	Mali	1–1
1	(Cameroon) 1972	Group stage	28 February 1972	Togo	1–1
2	(Morocco) 1988	Group stage	14 March 1988	Nigeria	0–3
2	(Morocco) 1988	Group stage	17 March 1988	Egypt	0–3
2	(Morocco) 1988	Group stage	20 March 1988	Cameroon	0–0
3	(Algeria) 1990	Group stage	3 March 1990	Senegal	0–0
3	(Algeria) 1990	Group stage	6 March 1990	Zambia	0–1
3	(Algeria) 1990	Group stage	9 March 1990	Cameroon	0–2
4	(Senegal) 1992	Group stage	14 January 1992	Nigeria	1–2
4	(Senegal) 1992	Group stage	16 January 1992	Senegal	0–3
5	(Tunisia) 2004	Group stage	26 January 2004	Mali	1–3
5	(Tunisia) 2004	Group stage	20 January 2004	Senegal	0–3
5	(Tunisia) 2004	Group stage	2 February 2004	Burkina Faso	3–0
6	(Egypt) 2019	Group stage	23 June 2019	Algeria	0–2
6	(Egypt) 2019	Group stage	27 June 2019	Tanzania	3–2
6	(Egypt) 2019	Group stage	1 July 2019	Senegal	0–3
