= Sharif El-Far =

Egyptian footballer (1929–1981)

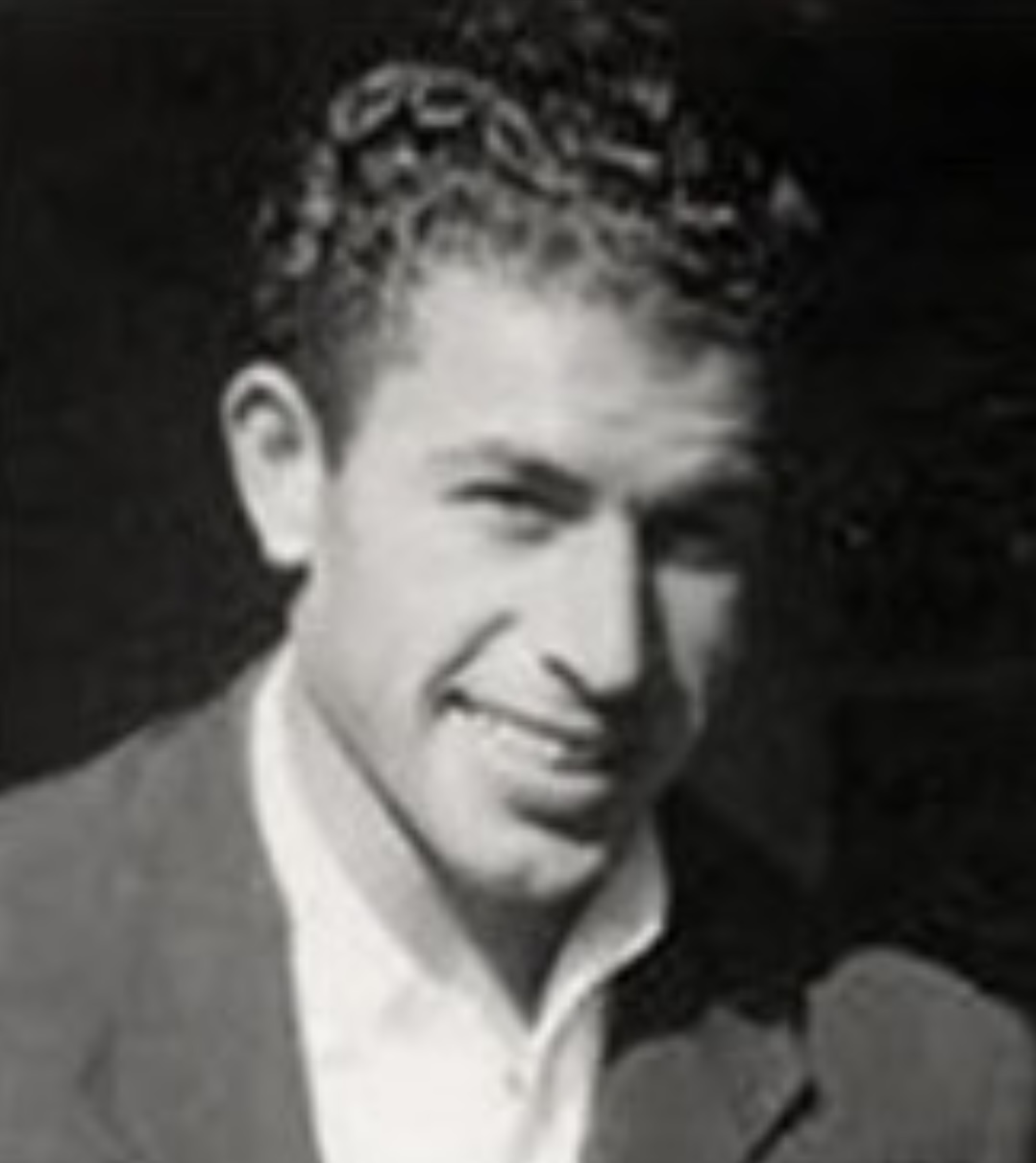
- Sharif El-Far, 1960

Personal information
- Full name: Kamaleddin Hussein
- Date of birth: 5 January 1929
- Date of death: 8 January 1981 (aged 52)
- Position: Defender

Youth career
- Zamalek

Senior career*
Years	Team	Apps	(Gls)
1948-1961	Zamalek		(64)

International career
1949–1960	Egypt		
Medal record
Men's football
Representing United Arab Republic
Africa Cup of Nations
Winner	1959 United Arab Republic
- * Club domestic league appearances and goals

Kamaleddin Hussein (Arabic: كمال الدين حسين), better known as Sharif El-Far (Arabic: شريف الفار; 5 January 1929 – 8 January 1981) was an Egyptian footballer. He played for Zamalek and competed with Egypt in the men's tournament at the 1952 Summer Olympics. Nicknamed the "Egypt's Puskas", he spent his whole football career with Zamalek, he won eleven titles with the Cairo giants. El-Far was a part of the team that won the gold medal at the 1953 Arab Games. He was also a part of the team that won the 1959 African Cup of Nations.

== Career ==
=== Club career ===
He is the younger brother of brothers Hassan El-Far and Hussein El-Far. He played throughout his career in Zamalek, from 1948 until 1961, scoring 64 goals in all competitions. He was the best player in Egypt in the 1950s, nicknamed the "Egypt's Puskas". He scored six goals in the Cairo derby.

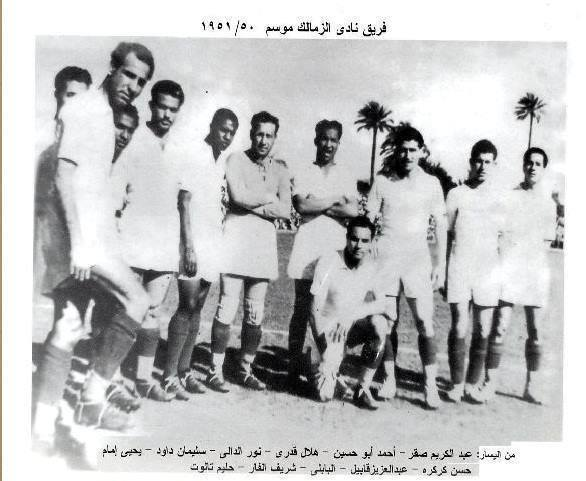
El-Far (second from right) with Zamalek in 1951

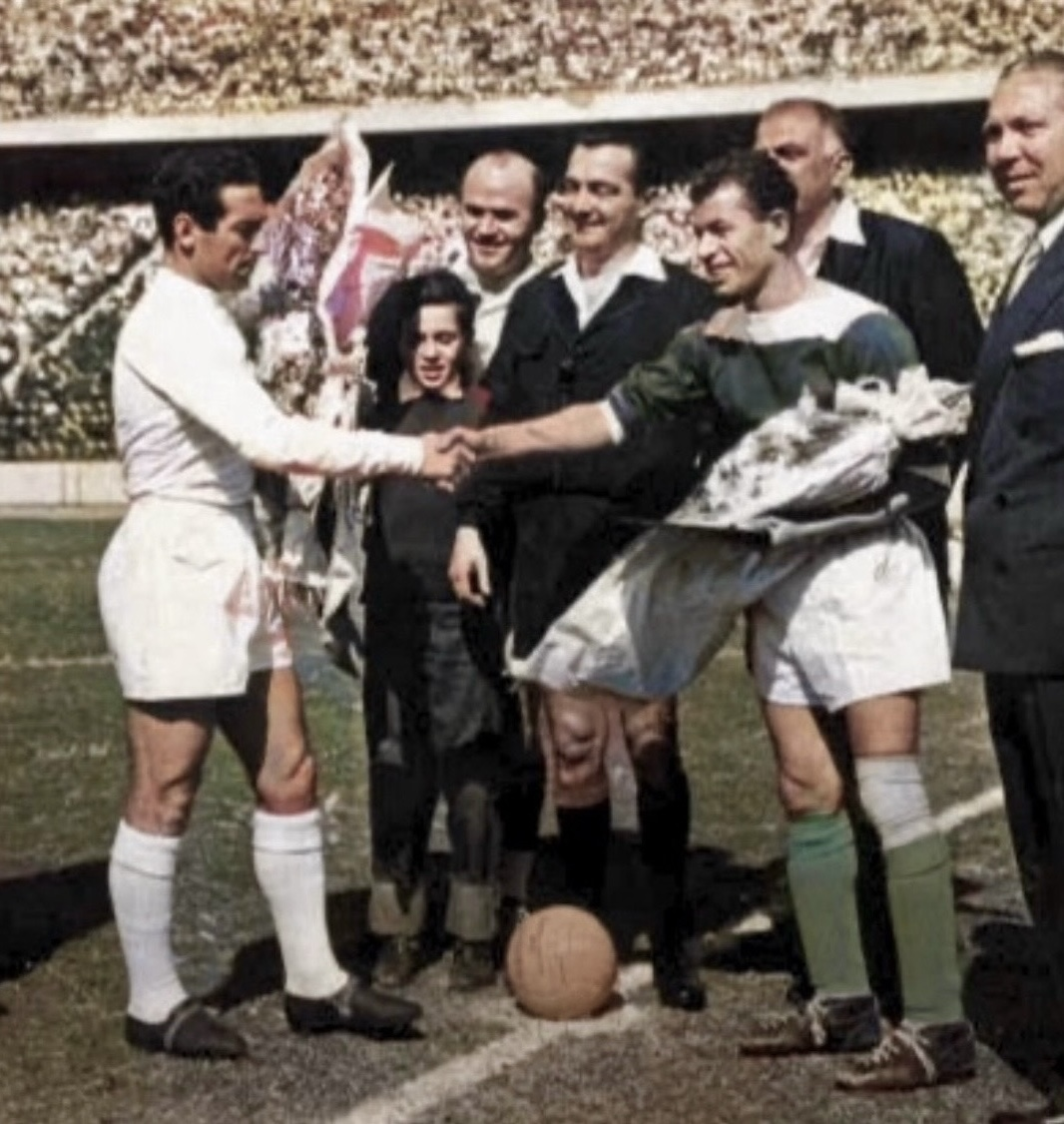
El-Far shaking hands with Real Madrid's captain Paco Gento before their friendly match on the occasion of celebrating 50 years on Zamalek's establishment, 10 March 1961

El-Far won with Zamalek the Egypt Cup title for six times in (1952, 1955, 1957, 1958, 1959, 1960). El-Far won with Zamalek four Cairo League titles in (1948–49, 1950–51, 1951–52, 1952–53), and the Egyptian League title once in (1959-60).

=== International career ===
He played for the Egypt national football team for almost eleven years. He was a part of the team that played in the 1952 Olympic Games in Helsinki. He played for his country in the 1953 Arab Games in Alexandria, where Egypt won the gold medal. El-Far was also a part of the team that won the 1959 African Cup of Nations on home soil. He retired from football in 1961.

== Honours ==
Zamalek

- Egypt Cup: 1952, 1955, 1957, 1958, 1959, 1960
- Cairo League: 1948–49, 1950–51, 1951–52, 1952–53
- Egyptian League: 1959-60

Egypt

- Arab Games: 1953

United Arab Republic

- African Cup of Nations: 1959
