= 1960–61 Egyptian Premier League =

Egyptian Premier League
- Season: 1960–61
- Dates: 7 October 1960 – 16 April 1961
- Champions: Ahly (10th title)
- Relegated: Ghazl El Mahalla
- Matches played: 90
- Goals scored: 249 (2.77 per match)
- Top goalscorer: Ali Mohsen (15 goals)
- Biggest home win: Zamalek 6–1 Al Masry (7 October 1960)
- Biggest away win: Al Ahly 1–5 Tersana (4 November 1960)
- Highest scoring: Zamalek 6–1 Al Masry (7 October 1960)

The 1960–61 Egyptian Premier League, was the 11th season of the Egyptian Premier League, the top Egyptian professional league for association football clubs, since its establishment in 1948. The season started on 7 October 1960 and concluded on 16 April 1961. Al Ahly won the league for the tenth time in the club's history.

== League table ==
Pos	Club	Pld	W	D	L	F	A	Pts
1	Al Ahly (C)	18	12	4	2	34	14	28
2	Zamalek	18	10	3	5	46	24	23
3	Tersana	18	6	8	4	28	23	20
4	El Qanah	18	6	7	5	21	23	19
5	Tanta	18	7	4	7	18	24	18
6	El Sekka El Hadid	18	5	5	8	23	26	15
7	Al Masry	18	5	5	8	20	31	15
8	Olympic	18	5	5	8	26	38	15
9	Ghazl El Mahalla (R)	18	3	8	7	13	17	14
10	Suez	18	4	5	9	20	29	13

(C)= Champions, (R)= Relegated, Pld = Matches played; W = Matches won; D = Matches drawn; L = Matches lost; F = Goals for; A = Goals against; ± = Goal difference; Pts = Points.

== Top goalscorers ==
Rank	Player	Club	Goals
1	(Kingdom of Yemen) (United Arab Republic) Ali Mohsen	Zamalek	15
2	(United Arab Republic) Badawi Abdel Fattah	Tersana	11
3	(United Arab Republic) Abdel Raouf	Olympic	9
4	(United Arab Republic) Nabil Nosair	Zamalek	8
5	(United Arab Republic) Ibrahim Tawfik	Tanta	8

== Teams ==
Locations of the 1960–61 Egyptian Premier League teams
