= Essam Baheeg =

Egyptian footballer (1931–2008)

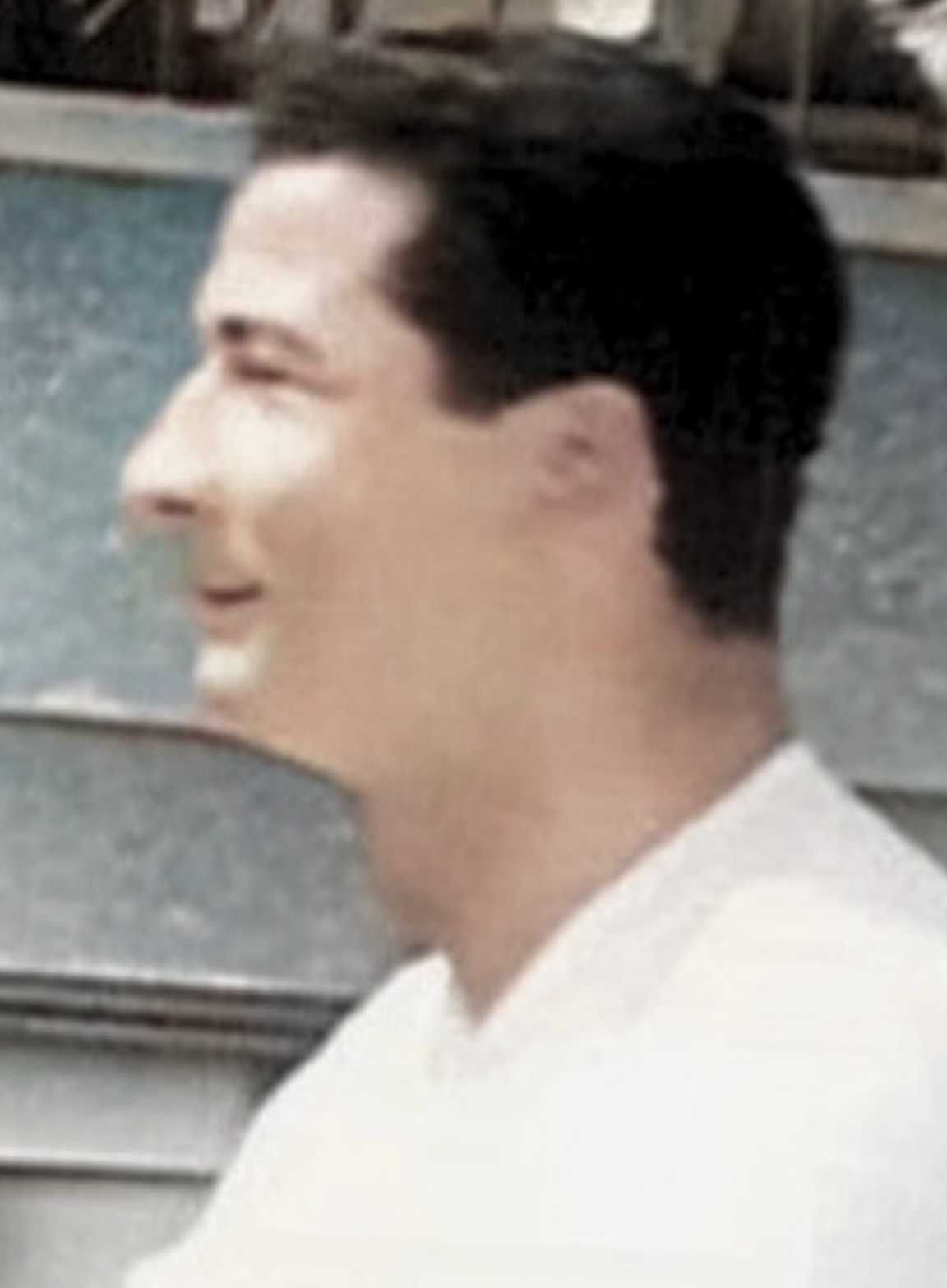
- Baheeg in 1964

Personal information
- Date of birth: 26 February 1931
- Place of birth: Alexandria, Egypt
- Date of death: 4 December 2008 (aged 77)
- Place of death: Cairo, Egypt
- Position: Winger

Senior career*
Years	Team	Apps	(Gls)
1949–1960	Zamalek		

International career
1953–1960	Egypt		(4)

Managerial career
- 1987–1988: Zamalek
- 1999–2000: Qanah
- 2000–2001: Sharqiya
- Sohag
Medal record
Men's football
Representing Egypt
Mediterranean Games
Winner	1955
Representing United Arab Republic
Africa Cup of Nations
Winner	1959 United Arab Republic
- * Club domestic league appearances and goals

Essam Baheeg (Egyptian Arabic: عصام بهيج; 26 February 1931 – 4 December 2008) was an Egyptian football manager and former footballer who played as a winger for Zamalek. He also played for the Egypt national team, and was a part of the team that won the 1959 Africa Cup of Nations, and scored the two winning goals for his country in the final. He was an iconic player in Egypt and one of the best of his generation. As a manager, Baheeg coached Zamalek for only one season, succeeding to win the Egyptian Premier League, Egypt Cup, Afro-Asian Club Championship and the Friendship International Cup.

== Early life ==
Baheeg was born on 26 February 1931 in Alexandria, Egypt to a middle class family. He started playing football in the streets of the city. Afterwards, he played for Mansoura youth teams. He then moved to Cairo to enlist to Egyptian Military Academy in mid-1940s.

== Playing career ==
=== Club career ===
Essam Baheeg's talent was discovered by Zamalek's president Mohammed Haidar Pasha who chose Baheeg for the club's youth team when he was 18 years old. In 1949, Baheeg played for Zamalek's first team, and quickly became a key player for Zamalek, thanks to his talent and skills, he reached fame at a young age. Baheeg was known for his loyalty and sincerity to Zamalek, this increased his popularity among the clubs' fans and the Egyptian football fans in general. He played for eleven seasons for Zamalek which he played for in his entire professional career.

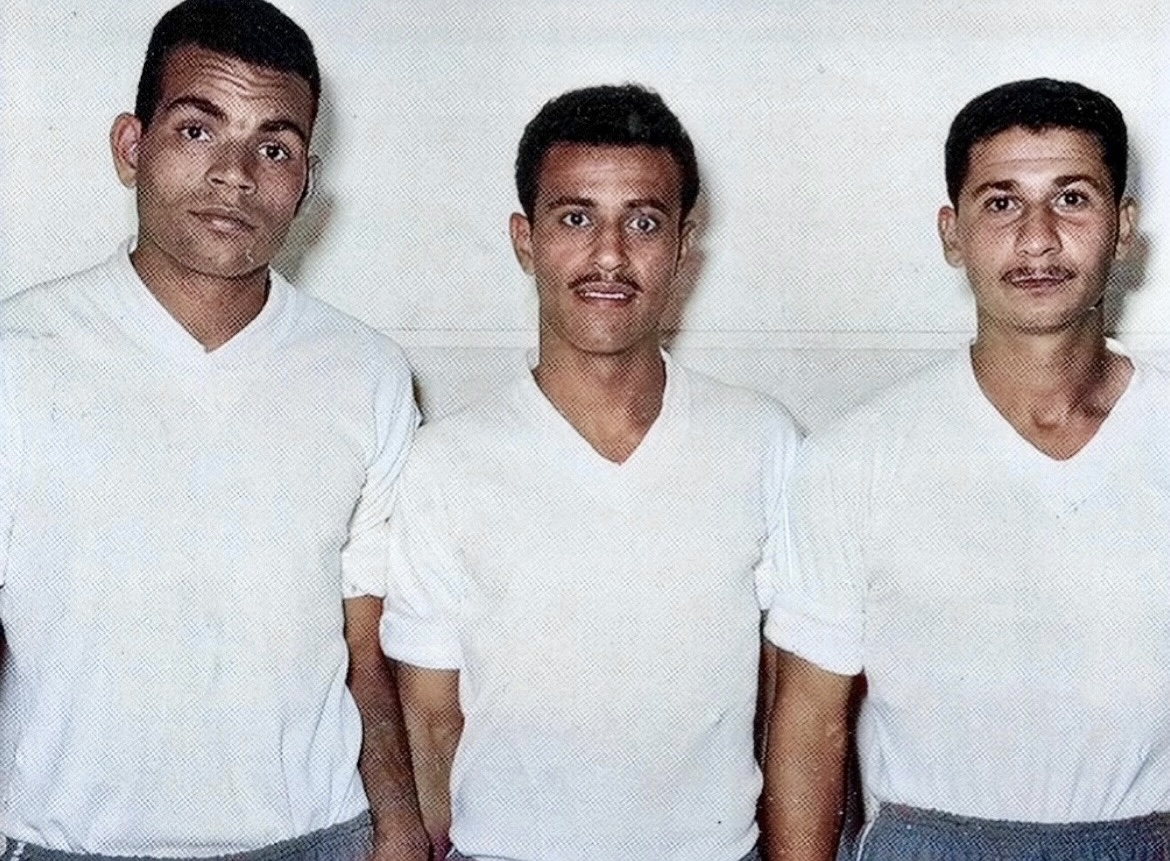
Baheeg (right), Samir Qotb and Ali Mohsen with Zamalek in 1959

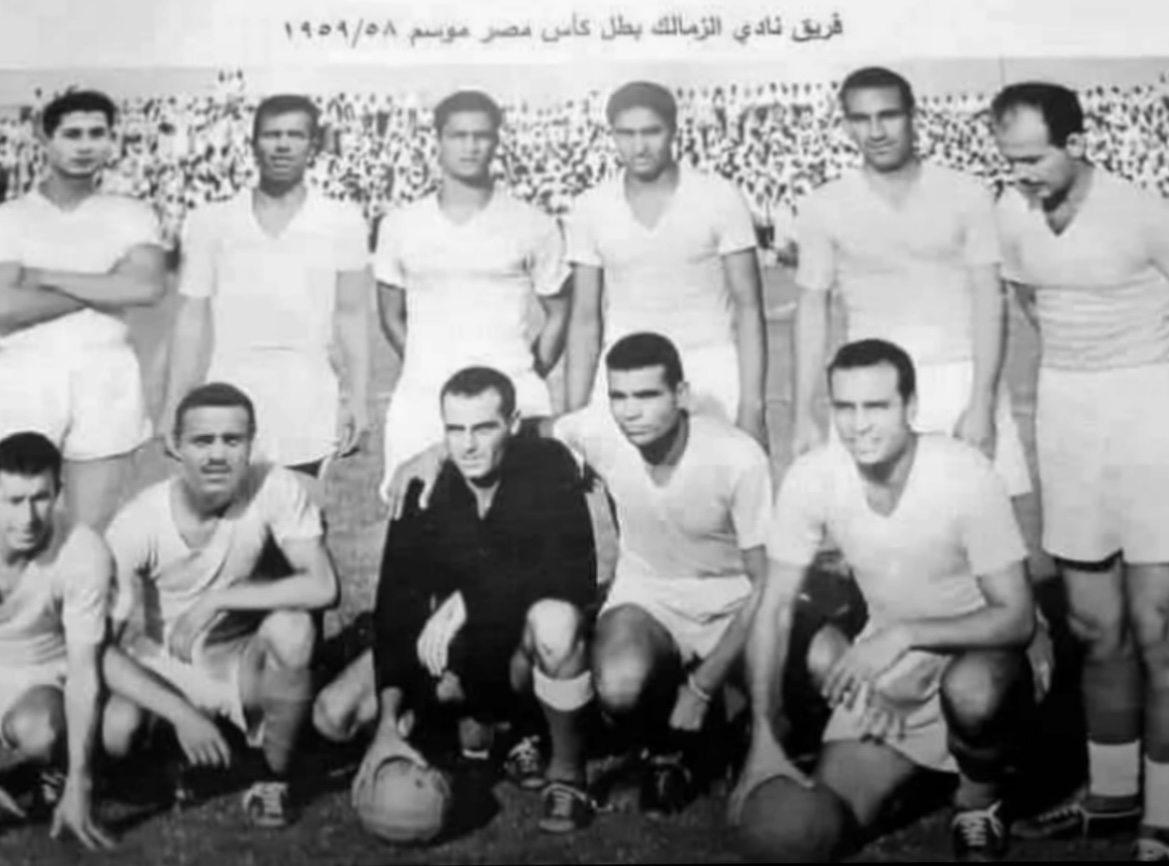
Baheeg (first standing from the left) with Zamalek in 1959

Despite his short career as a professional player, due to his early retirement, Baheeg won with his team six titles of the Egypt Cup (1951–52, 1954–55, 1956–57, 1957–58, 1958–59, 1959–60). He also won with Zamalek the Cairo League for three consecutive seasons in (1950–51, 1951–52, 1952–53). In his last season, Baheeg won with Zamalek the Egyptian Premier League title in (1959–60), he was one of the most valuable players in this season. He did not play for any other club throughout his 12-year football career, he's considered an icon and symbol for the club throughout its history. Baheeg retired from football in 1960.

=== International career ===
With his country, he played with Egypt for eleven years, from 1949 till his retirement. He was called for the Summer Olympic Games and was a part of Egypt's squad that participated in the 1952 Summer Olympics in Helsinki, but did not play in any matches.

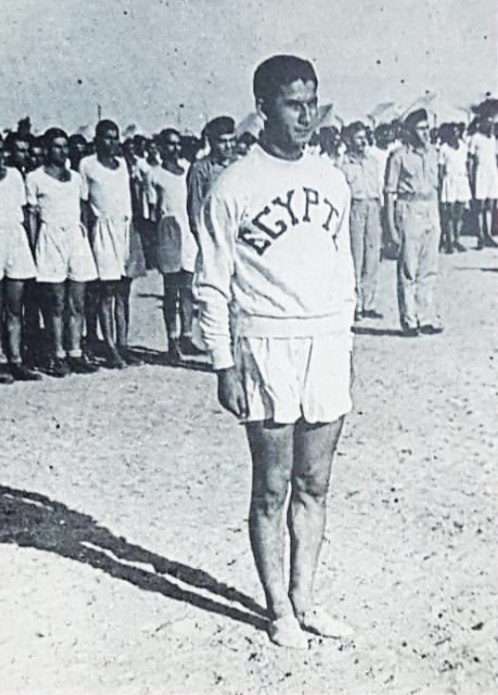
Baheeg with Egypt in the 1952 Summer Olympics

He played for his country in the 1959 African Cup of Nations, and participated in the two matches against the Ethiopia and Sudan. He scored his country's two winning goals in the final against Sudan and led his country to win their second title. Baheeg also scored a famous goal in France from forty yards in the football finals of the 1955 Mediterranean Games in Barcelona, in which Egypt won the gold medal.

== Coaching career ==
Baheeg coached the National Bank of Egypt SC in the 1970s, and coached Zamalek in the 1987–88 season and achieved the 1987–88 Egyptian League, the 1988 Egypt Cup, and the 1987 Afro-Asian Club Championship, in addition to winning the Friendship Cup. He coached El Qanah FC in the 1999-2000 season, coached El Sharkia SC in the 2000-01 season, and Sohag SC in the 2001-02 season. He won the elections and was a board member of Zamalek. Baheeg holds the record for Zamalek as the only coach who achieved 10 consecutive wins in the Egyptian League, and this number has not been broken yet with any other coach.

== Personal life and death ==
Baheeg was known for his numerous relationships with women during his football career, he was a rich topic for tabloids in the 1950s. He presented his personal experience in the film Talk of the City (1964) alongside Shwikar. He starred in the film alongside his colleague Hanafy Bastan and Ali Mohsen who appeared in the film, but Bastan and Baheeg acted in the film after their retirement from football.

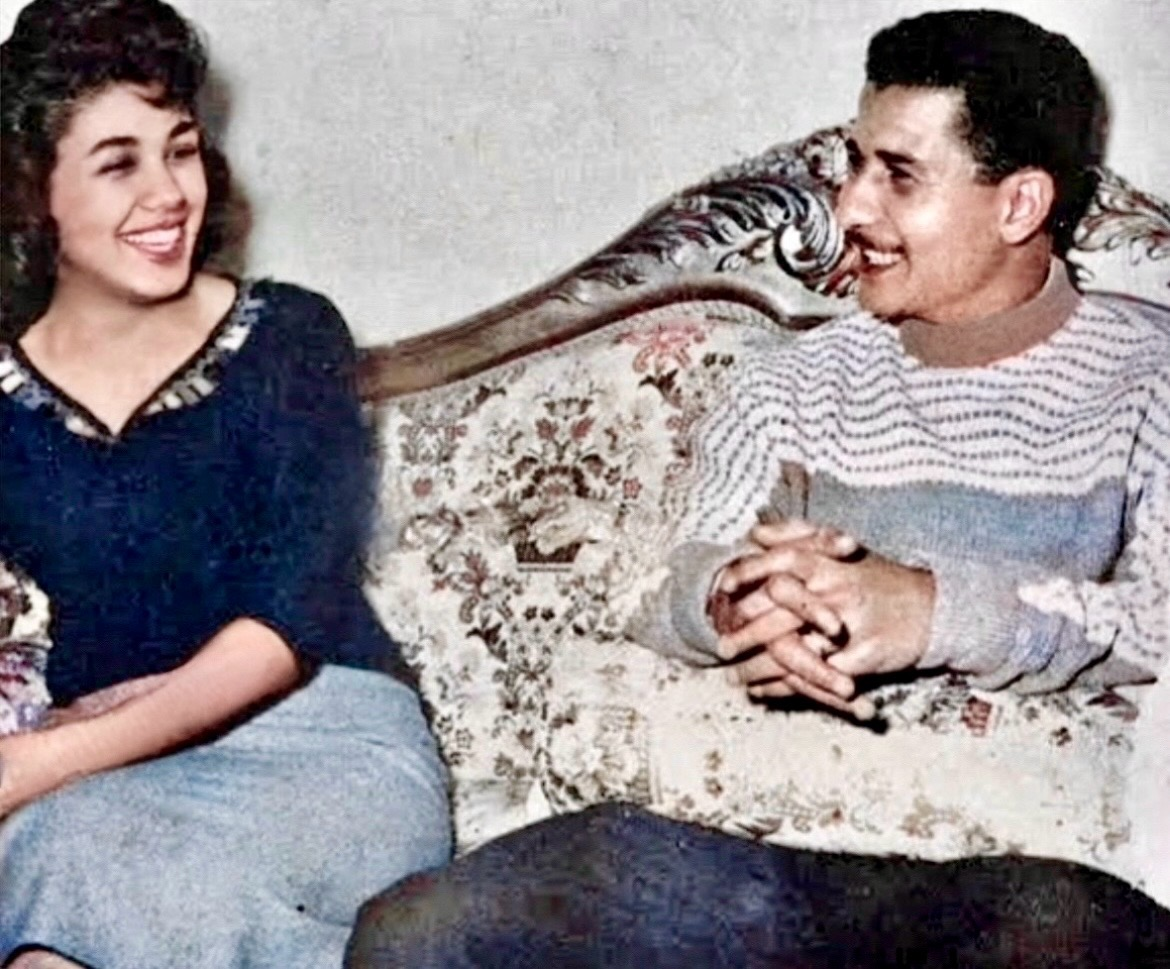
Baheeg with his wife Nahed Gabr in the 1960s

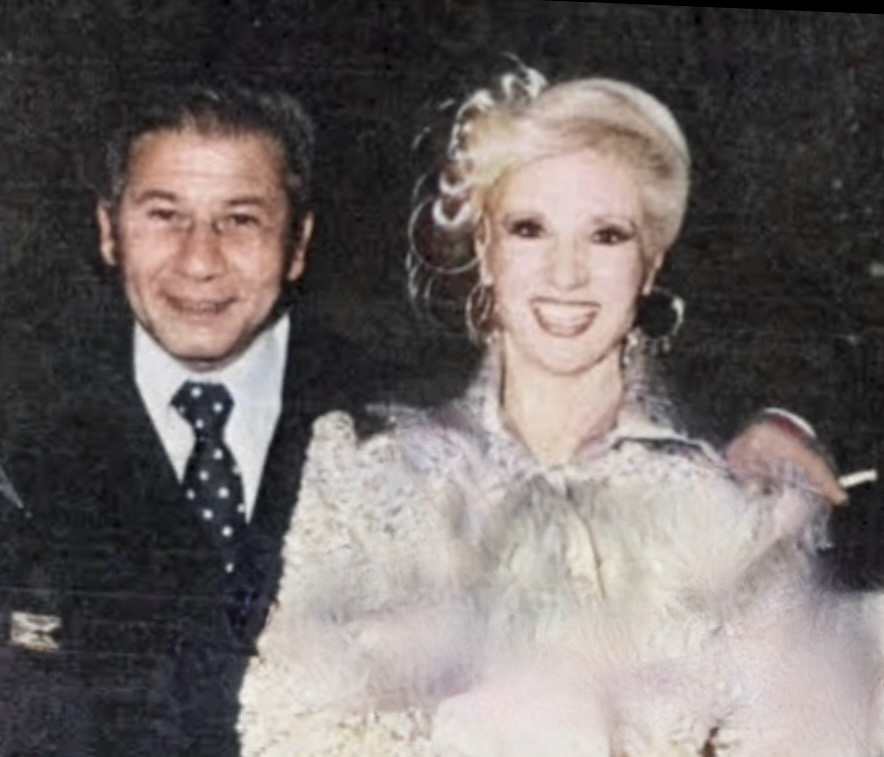
Baheeg with Sabah, c. 1980

While filming Talk of the City in 1964, Baheeg met actress Nahed Gabr, and quickly they fell in love with each other and got married in Cairo and had a son and a daughter, but they separated and divorced later, however, they remarried again in the 1980s and remained married until his death. Baheeg was an influential star in Egypt, as he was one of the most prominent players in the national team. He was connected in the Egyptian movie business and had close relationships in the Egyptian intellectual community at that time. He had several film stars and singers as friends such as Sabah.

Baheeg died on 4 December 2008 at the age of 77, in Cairo, Egypt.

== Career statistics ==
=== International goals ===
#	Date	Venue	Opponent	Score	Result	Competition
1.	17 July 1955	Barcelona, Spain	France B	6–2	Win	1955 Mediterranean Games
2.	20 July 1955	Barcelona, Spain	Spain B	1–1	Draw	1955 Mediterranean Games
3.	29 May 1959	Al Ahly Stadium, Cairo, United Arab Republic	Sudan	2–1	Win	1959 African Cup of Nations
4.	29 May 1959	Al Ahly Stadium, Cairo, United Arab Republic	Sudan	2–1	Win	1959 African Cup of Nations
Correct as of 13 January 2017

== Honours ==
=== Player ===
Zamalek

- Egypt Cup: 1951–52, 1954–55, 1956–57, 1957–58, 1958–59, 1959–60
- Cairo League: 1950–51, 1951–52, 1952–53
- Egyptian Premier League (1): 1959–60

Egypt

- Mediterranean Games: 1955

United Arab Republic

- African Cup of Nations: 1959

=== Manager ===
Zamalek

- Egyptian Premier League: 1987–88
- Egypt Cup : 1987–88
- Afro-Asian Club Championship: 1987
- Friendship International Cup: 1988

== Filmography ==
- Talk of the City (Hadeeth Al-Madina Arabic: حديث المدينة): 1964.
