= Boraî Bashir =

Sudanese footballer (1932–2012)

Boraî Ahmed Al-Bashir
Personal information
- Date of birth: 1932
- Place of birth: Omdurman, Sudan
- Date of death: 6 April 2012 (aged 80)
- Place of death: Omdurman, Sudan
- Position: Defender

Senior career*
Years	Team	Apps	(Gls)
1949–1951	Al-Horriya SC		
1951–1954	Al-Merreikh SC		
1954–1955	Al-Hilal Club		
1954–1964	Al-Merreikh SC	342	(17)

International career
1956–1962	Sudan	21	(1)
Medal record
Men's football
Representing Sudan
Africa Cup of Nations
Runner-up	1959 United Arab Republic
Third place	1957 Sudan
- * Club domestic league appearances and goals

Boraî Ahmed El Bashir (Arabic: برعي أحمد البشير; 1932 – 6 April 2012) was a Sudanese footballer who played as a defender, spending most of his career with Al-Merreikh SC. He scored the first Sudanese goal in the first Africa Cup of Nations in 1957 in Sudan.

== Honours ==
Al-Merreikh SC

- Sudan Cup: 1964

Sudan

- African Cup of Nations: runner-up, 1959; 3rd place, 1957
