= Samir Qotb =

Egyptian footballer (1938–2006)

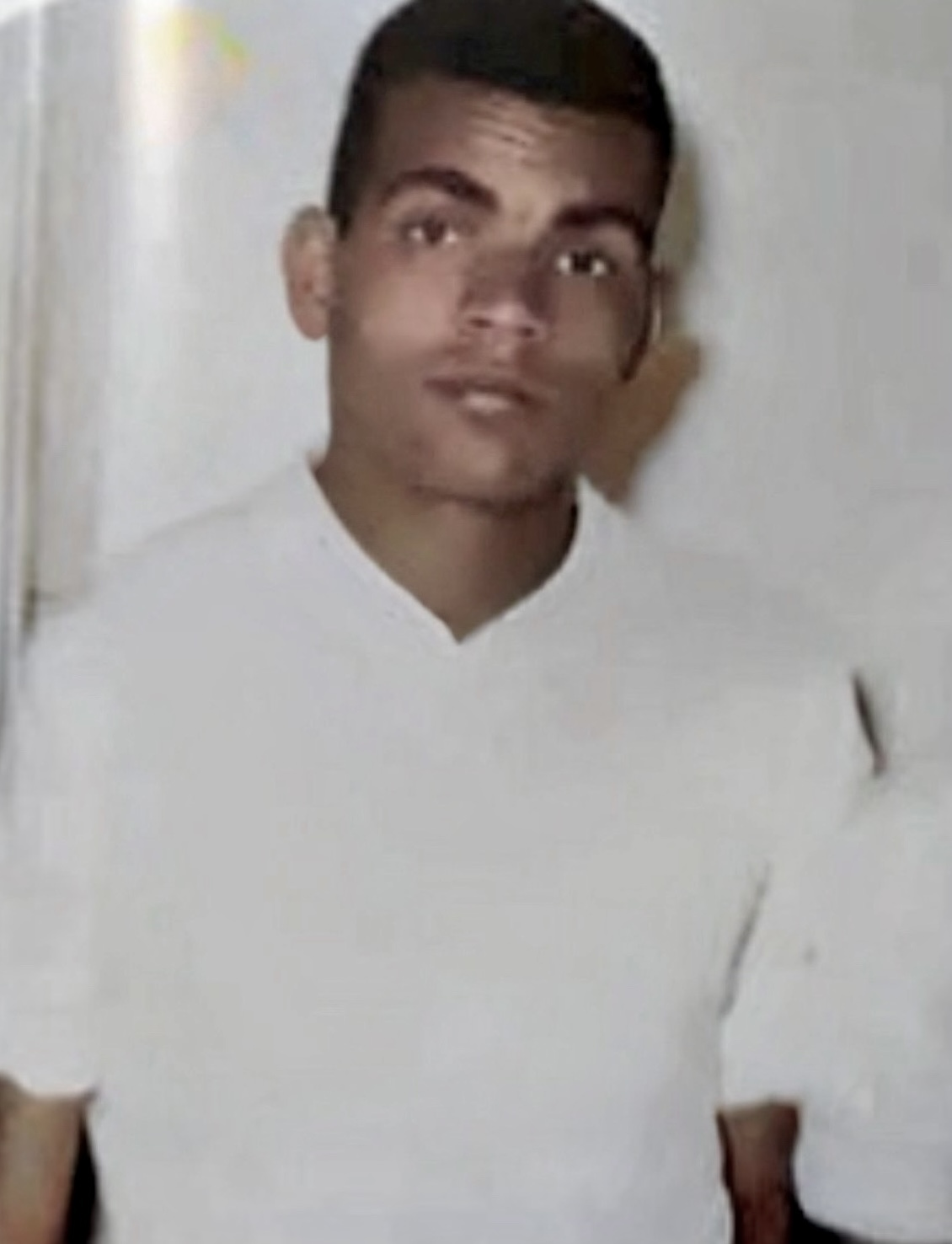
- Qotb in 1959

Personal information
- Full name: Mohamed Samir Qotb
- Date of birth: 16 March 1938
- Place of birth: Alexandria, Egypt
- Date of death: 28 June 2006 (aged 68)
- Place of death: Cairo, Egypt
- Position: Midfielder

Senior career*
Years	Team	Apps	(Gls)
1955–1967	Zamalek		

International career
1957-1964	Egypt	41	(3)
Medal record
Men's Football
Representing Egypt
Africa Cup of Nations
Winner	1957 Sudan
Representing United Arab Republic
Africa Cup of Nations
Runner-up	1962 Ethiopia
- * Club domestic league appearances and goals

Mohamed Samir Qotb (Arabic: مُحَمَّد سَمِير قُطْب) (16 March 1938 — 28 June 2006) was an Egyptian footballer who played as a midfielder for Zamalek. He also played for the Egyptian national team, was part of the team that won the 1957 Africa Cup of Nations. He spent his whole career with Zamalek, and won with the club three Egyptian Premier League titles and five Egypt Cup titles.He played with Egypt at the 1962 African Cup of Nations where Egypt finished as runner-ups. Qotb also represented his country in the 1960 and 1964 Summer Olympics.

== Career ==
Qotb started his career with Zamalek youth teams. He played in Zamalek for his whole career. He won with Zamalek the Egyptian Premier League in (1959–60, 1963–64, 1964–65), and the Egypt Cup in (1956–57, 1957–58, 1958–59, 1959–60, 1961–62).

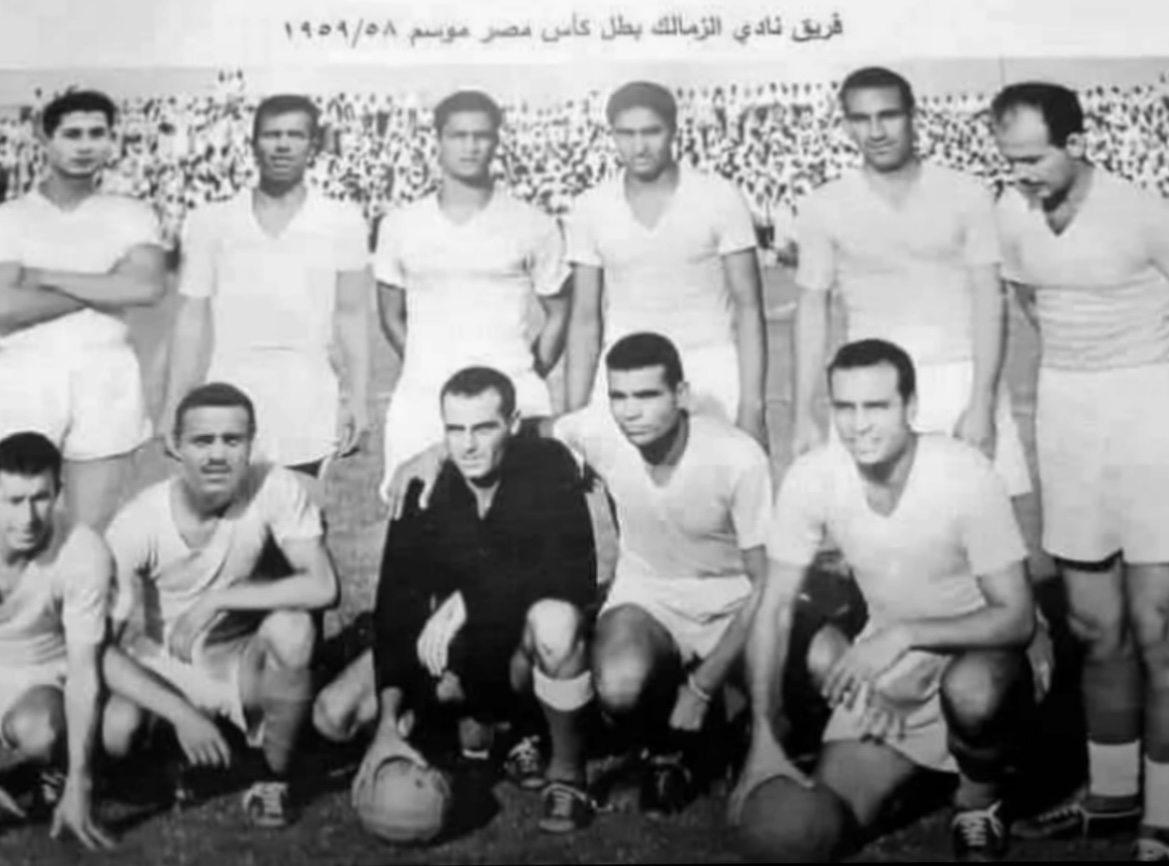
Qotb (front row, second from right) with Zamalek in 1959

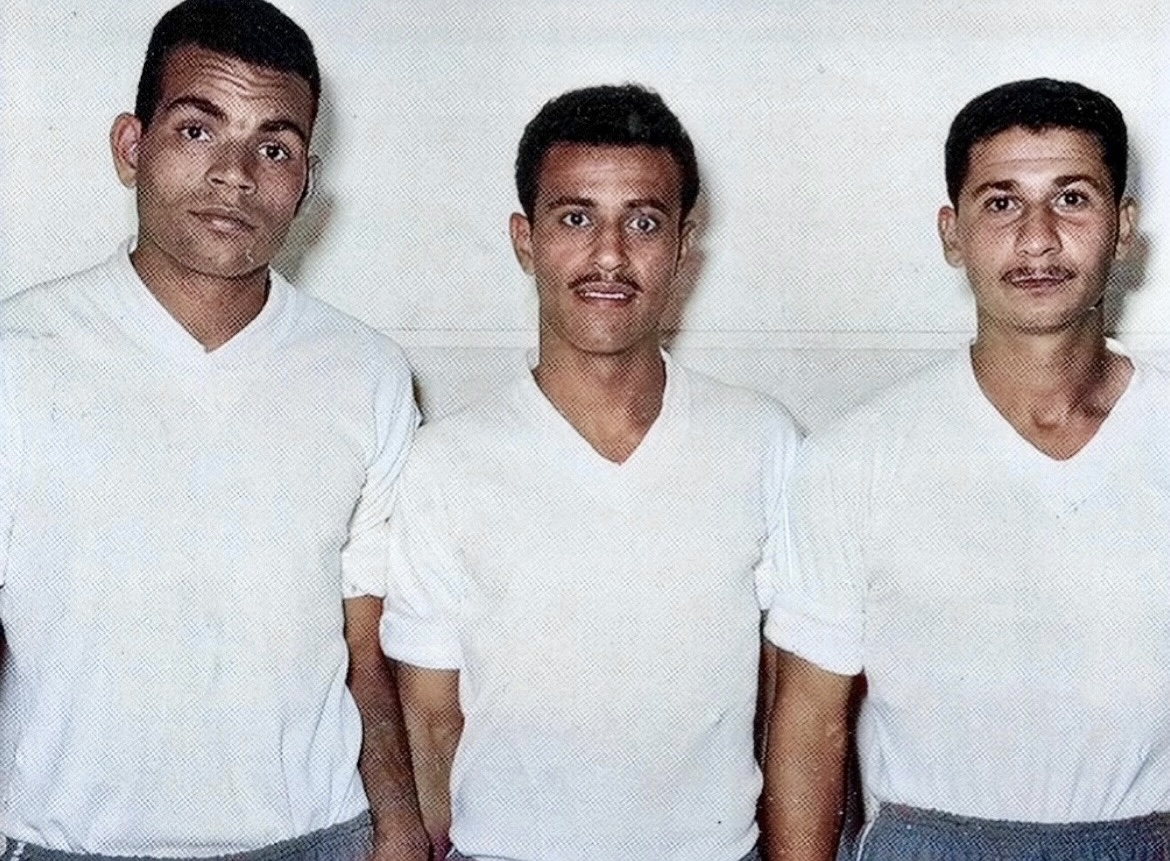
Zamalek players, from left to right; Qotb, Ali Mohsen and Essam Baheeg in 1959

With the Egypt national football team, he was part of the team that won the Africa Cup of Nations title in 1957 and played for Egypt in the 1962 African Cup of Nations where Egypt finished as runner-ups. Qotb played for his country at the 1960 Summer Olympics in Rome. He was also part of the team that finished fourth in the 1964 Summer Olympics in Tokyo.

== Honours ==
Zamalek

- Egyptian Premier League: 1959–60, 1963–64, 1964–65
- Egypt Cup: 1957, 1958, 1959, 1960, 1962

Egypt

- African Cup of Nations: 1957

United Arab Republic

- African Cup of Nations: runner-up, 1962
