= Ali Mohsen =

Yemeni footballer

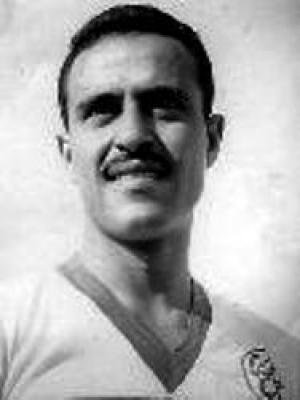
- Mohsen with Zamalek in 1959

Personal information
- Full name: Ali Mohsen Saad Al-Moraisi
- Date of birth: 16 September 1940
- Place of birth: Aden, Colony of Aden
- Date of death: 26 November 1993 (aged 53)
- Place of death: Sana'a, Yemen
- Height: 1.70 m (5 ft 7 in)
- Position: Forward

Youth career
- Al-Ghazal SC

Senior career*
Years	Team	Apps	(Gls)
1958–1966	Zamalek		

International career
1961	Egypt		

Managerial career
- 1970–1974: Horseed
- 1975: South Yemen U20
- * Club domestic league appearances and goals

Ali Mohsen Al-Moraisi (Arabic: علي محسن المريسي; 1940 – 1993) was a Yemeni professional footballer who played as a forward. He was the first Yemeni player to play in the Egyptian League, with Zamalek in the 1960s. Mohsen was also the first foreigner to ever finish as top-scorer of the Egyptian League.

== Career ==
Mohsen played for Zamalek from 1958 to 1966, he won with the Cairo giants, the Egyptian Premier League in (1959–60, 1963–64, 1964–65), and the Egypt Cup in (1958, 1959, 1960, 1962). While with Zamalek, Mohsen once scored against Real Madrid in 1961, in a 7–1 defeat, while playing for an Egyptian select side with several players from Zamalek, Al Ahly and Al Masry.

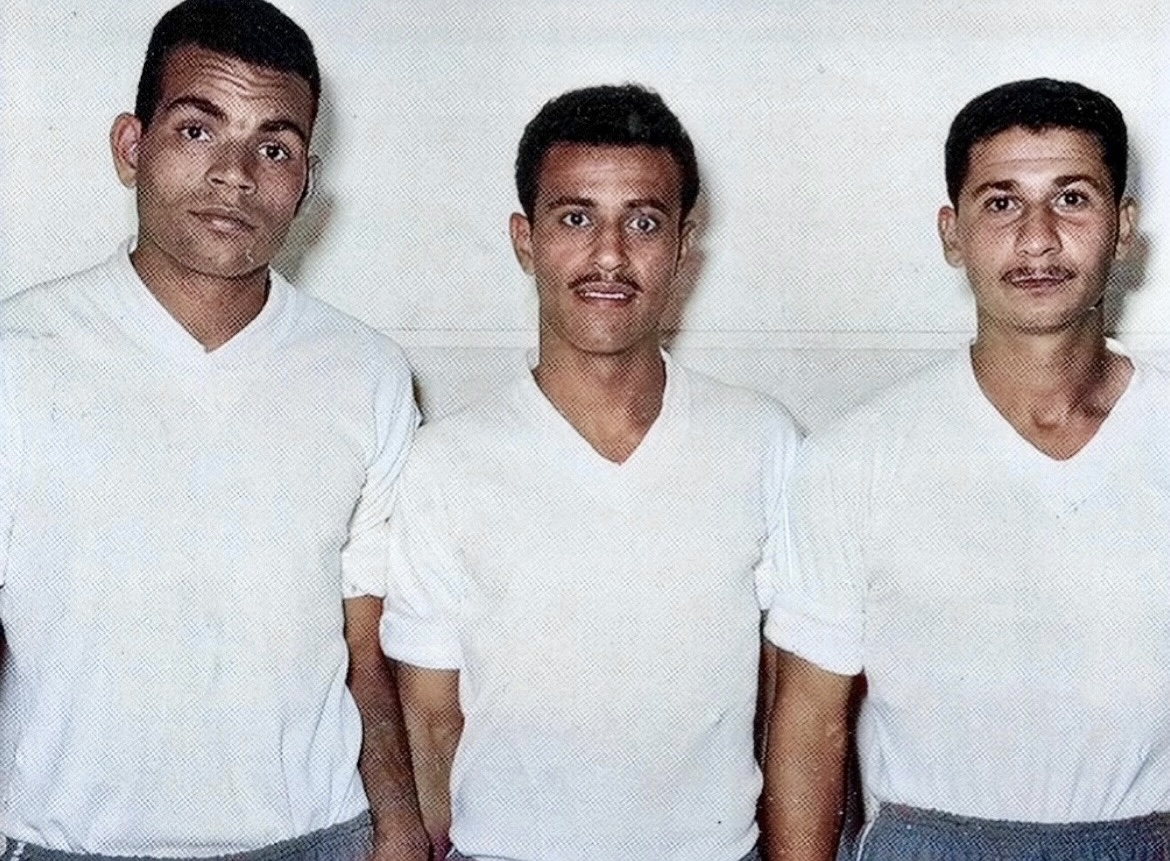
Samir Qotb, Mohsen (middle) and Essam Baheeg with Zamalek in 1959

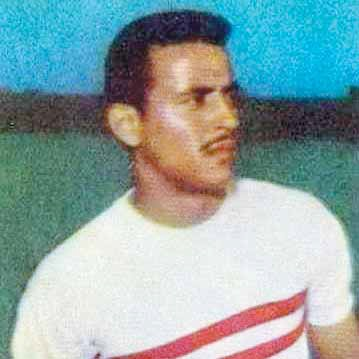
Mohsen with Zamalek in 1961

After retiring from his playing career, he coached Somalia in 1973, and Al-Satra in Southern Yemen, before moving to Johar Al-Rab. The national stadium in Sana'a is named after the player. He was appointed councilor for Minister of Youth and Sports until his death in 1994. The Ali Mohsen Al-Moraisi Tournament has been played annually in his honour since 1992, in cooperation with Aden Football Association.

== Honours and achievements ==
=== Player ===
Zamalek

- Egyptian Premier League: 1959–60, 1963–64, 1964–65
- Egypt Cup: 1957–58, 1958–59, 1959–60, 1961–62

=== Individual ===
- Egyptian Premier League Top goalscorer: 1960–61

=== Manager ===
Horseed

- Somalia League: 1971–72, 1972–73, 1973–74

== See also ==
- Ali Muhesen Stadium
- Ali Muhsin Cup
