= Nabil Nosair =

Egyptian footballer (1938–2016)

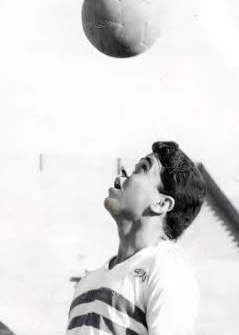
- Nosair with Zamalek in 1967

Personal information
- Date of birth: 11 October 1938
- Place of birth: Monufia, Egypt
- Date of death: 2 April 2016 (aged 77)
- Place of death: Giza, Egypt
- Position: Left winger

Youth career
- 1954–1958: Zamalek B

Senior career*
Years	Team	Apps	(Gls)
1958–1967	Zamalek		

International career
1960–1967	Egypt		
Medal record
Men's football
Representing Egypt
Africa Cup of Nations
Silver medal – second place	1962
Arab Games
Gold medal – first place	1965
- * Club domestic league appearances and goals

Nabil Nosair (Arabic: نبيل نصير; 11 October 1938 – 2 April 2016) was an Egyptian footballer who played as a left winger for Zamalek, he also played for the Egypt national team. He represented Egypt in 1960 Summer Olympics and the 1964 Summer Olympics, and was also a part of the team that finished second at the 1962 African Cup of Nations in Ethiopia. Nosair won with his country the gold medal at the 1965 Arab Games.

== Biography ==
Nabil Nosair was born on 11 October 1938. While he was 16 in 1954, he was informed of youth team tests appointment in Zamalek by one of his colleagues at Qasr Al-Doubara School, Mahrous Gaber, who was himself a junior in Zamalek. He had an appointment to go to Al Ahly, but he preferred Zamalek.

Nosair's first match with the first team was in 1958 against El Teram in the Egyptian Premier League at the old club stadium in the Ballon area. He scored a famous goal in Al Ahly in the Cairo derby, where he scored in Abdel Galil, the best goalkeeper in Egypt at the time. He won with Zamalek the Egyptian Premier League for three times in (1959–60, 1963–64, 1964–65). He also won with Zamalek three titles of the Egypt Cup in (1958–59, 1959–60, 1961–62).

With the Egypt national team, Nosair played for his country at the 1962 African Cup of Nations, where the Egyptians finished as runners up. He also represented his country in the 1960 Summer Olympic Games in Rome and 1964 Summer Olympic Games in Tokyo, where Egypt finished fourth. Nosir is also known for his goal against Brazil in a friendly match which took place in Cairo on 1 May 1960 after Brazil won the 1958 World Cup. Nosair was part of the team that won the gold medal at the 1965 Arab Games in Cairo. He was titled the "Rhythm Officer" by Egyptian press. He retired from professional football in 1967.

After his retirement from professional football, He worked as Zamalek's sports director for several years. He also worked as youth coach for Zamalek youth teams. He was elected as board member for Zamalek for more than a period. Nosair died in 2016 aged 77 in Giza, Egypt.

== Honours ==
Zamalek SC

- Egyptian Premier League: (3)
  1959–60, 1963–64, 1964–65
- Egypt Cup: (3)
  1958–59, 1959–60, 1961–62

Egypt

- Arab Games: (1)
  1965
