= 1959 Egypt Cup final =

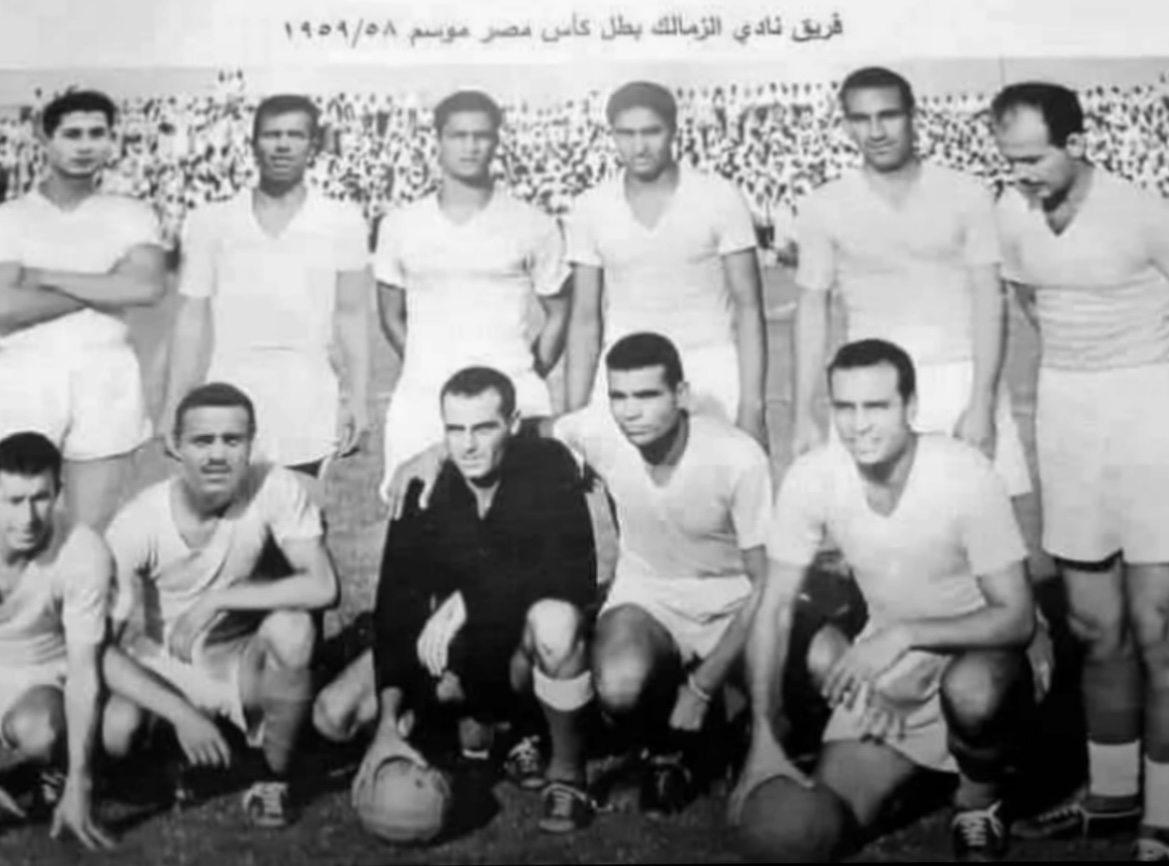
- Event: 1958–59 Egypt Cup
Zamalek	Al-Ahly
2	1
- Date: 24 April 1959

1959 Egypt Cup final, was the final match of 1958–59 Egypt Cup, between Zamalek and Al-Ahly, Zamalek won the match by 2–1.

== Route to the final ==
Zamalek		Round	Al-Ahly
Opponent	Result	1958–59 Egypt Cup	Opponent	Result
Mansoura	4 – 0	First Round
Ithad Suez	2 – 1	Quarterfinals
El-Olympi	2 – 1	Semifinals

== Game description ==
=== Match details ===
24 April 1959

Zamalek	2 – 1	Al-Ahly
Baheeg 29'; Mohsen 46'	Report	Ismail 65'

Zamalek	Al-Ahly

Zamalek:
GK	(Italy) Aldo Stella
RB	(United Arab Republic) Mohamed Rifai
CB	(United Arab Republic) Ahmed Mostafa
CB	(United Arab Republic) Nour El-Dali
LB	(United Arab Republic) Abdou Noshi
CM	(United Arab Republic) Samir Qotb
CM	(United Arab Republic) Alaa El-Hamouly
RW	(United Arab Republic) Essam Baheeg
AM	(United Arab Republic) Yakan Hussein
LW	(Yemen Arab Republic) Ali Mohsen
CF	(United Arab Republic) Sherif El-Far
Manager:

Al-Ahly:
GK	(United Arab Republic) Adel Hekal
RB	(United Arab Republic) Tarek Selim
CB	(United Arab Republic) Talaat Abdel Hamid
CB	(United Arab Republic) Fawzy Gomaa
LB	(United Arab Republic) Reda Abdel Hamid
CM	(United Arab Republic) Rifaat El-Fanagily
CM	(United Arab Republic) Taha Ismail
RW	(United Arab Republic) Wagih Moustafa
AM	(United Arab Republic) El-Sayed El-Dhizui
LW	(United Arab Republic) Saleh Selim
CF	(United Arab Republic) Mimi El-Sherbini
Manager:
