= 1960 Egypt Cup final =

- Event: 1959–60 Egypt Cup
Zamalek	El-Olympi
3	2
- Date: 3 June 1960

The 1960 Egypt Cup final was the final match of 1959–60 Egypt Cup constested between Zamalek and El-Olympi held on 3 June 1960. Zamalek won the match 3–2.

== Route to the final ==
Zamalek		Round	El-Olympi
Opponent	Result	1959–60 Egypt Cup	Opponent	Result
Ismaily	4–2	First Round
Mahala	2–1	Quarterfinals
Quanah	1–0	Semifinals

== Match details ==
3 June 1960

Zamalek	3–2	El-Olympi
Mohsen 44', 65'; Qadry (?)	Report	Sorour 64'; Roushdy (?)

Zamalek:
GK	(Italy) Aldo Stella
RB	(United Arab Republic) Mohamed Rifai
CB	(United Arab Republic) Ahmed Mostafa
CB	(United Arab Republic) Alaa El-Hamouly
LB	(United Arab Republic) Samir Qotb
CM	(United Arab Republic) Raafat Attia
CM	(United Arab Republic) Khalil Said Qadry
RW	(United Arab Republic) Nabil Nosair
AM	(Yemen Arab Republic) Ali Mohsen
LW	(United Arab Republic) Abdou Noshi
CF	(United Arab Republic) Sherif El-Far
Manager:

El-Olympi:
GK	(United Arab Republic) Taki
RB	(United Arab Republic) Mohamed Shawkat
CB	(United Arab Republic) Mosaad Daoud
CB	(United Arab Republic) Hassan Sharabeya
LB	(United Arab Republic) Fathi El-Nahhas
CM	(United Arab Republic) Makram
CM	(United Arab Republic) Sayed Charlie
RW	(United Arab Republic) Ismail El-Yamani
AM	(United Arab Republic) Morshedi
LW	(United Arab Republic) Amin Roushdy
CF	(United Arab Republic) Refaei Sorour
Manager:
