= 1963–64 Egyptian Premier League =

Egyptian Premier League
- Season: 1963–64
- Dates: 4 October 1963 – 16 June 1964
- Champions: Zamalek (2nd title)
- Relegated: Damietta; Beni Suef; Aviation; Damanhour; El Teram; El Mansoura; Suez; Port Fouad; Tanta; El Baharia; Maleyat Kafr El Zayat; Suez Petroleum
- Matches played: 281
- Goals scored: 840 (2.99 per match)
- Top goalscorer: Moustafa Reyadh (26 goals)

The 1963–64 Egyptian Premier League, was the 14th season of the Egyptian Premier League, the top Egyptian professional league for association football clubs, since its establishment in 1948.The league consisted of 2 groups each of 12 clubs. The season started on 4 October 1963 and concluded on 16 June 1964. Zamalek won the league for the second time in the club's history.

== League table ==
=== Group 1 ===
Pos	Club	Pld	W	D	L	F	A	Pts
1	Tersana (Q)	22	16	3	3	68	27	35
2	Ismaily	22	14	4	4	46	17	32
3	Olympic	22	13	5	4	47	30	31
4	Al Masry	22	14	2	6	54	25	30
5	Al Ahly	22	14	1	7	43	25	29
6	Suez (QR)	22	8	7	7	29	28	23
7	Damietta (QR)	22	9	1	12	26	40	19
8	Beni Suef (R)	22	7	5	10	25	40	19
9	Aviation (R)	22	5	4	13	23	39	14
10	Damanhour (R)	22	6	2	14	25	53	14
11	El Teram (R)	22	3	6	13	22	38	12
12	El Mansoura (R)	22	2	2	18	11	57	6

(Q)= Qualification to Championship play-off, (R)= Relegated, (QR)=Qualified to Relegation play-off, Pld = Matches played; W = Matches won; D = Matches drawn; L = Matches lost; F = Goals for; A = Goals against; ± = Goal difference; Pts = Points.

=== Group 2 ===
Pos	Club	Pld	W	D	L	F	A	Pts
1	Zamalek (Q)	22	14	7	1	42	18	35
2	Al Ittihad	22	12	5	5	42	23	29
3	El Qanah	22	11	6	5	44	21	28
4	El Sekka El Hadid	22	11	6	5	39	18	28
5	El-Sawahel	22	11	6	5	39	31	28
6	Ithad Suez (QR)	22	10	6	6	32	22	26
7	Ghazl El Mahalla (QR)	22	9	7	6	26	29	25
8	Port Fouad (R)	22	6	6	10	27	30	18
9	Tanta (R)	22	6	6	10	22	34	18
10	El Baharia (R)	22	4	5	13	29	48	13
11	Maleyat Kafr El Zayat (R)	22	4	3	15	18	46	11
12	Suez Petroleum (R)	22	2	1	19	14	53	5

(Q)= Qualification to Championship play-off, (R)= Relegated, (QR)=Qualified to Relegation play-off, Pld = Matches played; W = Matches won; D = Matches drawn; L = Matches lost; F = Goals for; A = Goals against; ± = Goal difference; Pts = Points.

=== Relegation play-off ===
Pos	Club	Pld	W	D	L	F	A	Pts
1	Suez	6	3	1	2	10	7	7
2	Ghazl El Mahalla	6	3	1	2	12	12	7
3	Ithad Suez (R)	6	2	1	3	8	8	5
4	Damietta (R)	6	2	1	3	8	11	5

(R)= Relegated, Pld = Matches played; W = Matches won; D = Matches drawn; L = Matches lost; F = Goals for; A = Goals against; ± = Goal difference; Pts = Points.

== Final stage ==
=== Championship play-off matches ===
31 May 1964	Zamalek	4–2	Tersana
	Emam 18'; Qotb 56'; Mohsen 58'; Mahmoud 62'		El-Nazer 4'; El-Shazly 78'

5 June 1964	Tersana	1–3	Zamalek
	El-Shazly 48'		Nosair 24'; Noshi 27'; Emam 72'

Zamalek won 7–3 on aggregate.

== Top goalscorers ==
Rank	Player	Club	Goals
1	(United Arab Republic) Moustafa Reyadh	Tersana	26
2	(United Arab Republic) Hassan El-Shazly	Tersana	24
3	(United Arab Republic) Ezz El-Din Yaqoub	Olympic Club	23
4	(United Arab Republic) Mohamed Seddeek	Ismaily	23
5	(United Arab Republic) Anwar Shehata	El-Sawahel	19
