= Football at the 1953 Arab Games =

1953 Arab Games football tournament
Tournament details
- Host country: Egypt
- City: Alexandria
- Dates: 1–9 August 1953
- Teams: 6 (from 2 confederations)
- Venue: 2 (in 1 host city)

Final positions
- Champions: Egypt (1st title)
- Runners-up: Syria
- Third place: Libya
- Fourth place: Jordan

Tournament statistics
- Matches played: 9
- Goals scored: 56 (6.22 per match)
- Top scorer: (Egypt) Ad-Diba (9 goals)

The 1953 Arab Games football tournament was the 1st edition of the Arab Games men's football tournament. The football tournament was held in Alexandria, the Egypt between 1–9 August 1953 as part of the 1953 Arab Games.

== Participating teams ==
The following countries have participated for the final tournament:

- Egypt (hosts)
- Jordan
- Lebanon
- Libya
- Palestine
- Syria

== Group stage ==
=== Group A ===
Team	Pld	W	D	L	GF	GA	GD	Pts
Egypt	2	2	0	0	18	3	+15	6
Libya	2	1	0	1	7	12	–5	3
Palestine	2	0	0	2	3	13	–10	0

1 August 1953

Egypt	8–1	Palestine
Qadoura 10'; Sharif El-Far 25'; Ad-Diba 34', 37', 42', 60'; El-Dhizui 50', 80'		Farah 17'

Alexandria Stadium, Alexandria

3 August 1953

Libya	5–2	Palestine
Al-Ghannai 12', 31'; Al-Zantouni 40'; Al-Yamani 43'; Al-Houni 78'		El-Sharfa 45' (?)

Alexandria Stadium, Alexandria

6 August 1953

Egypt	10–2	Libya
Rous 4'; El-Dhizui 19', 56', 69', 77'; Ad-Diba 46', 79', 88'; Qadoura 65' ? (?)		Zantouni 35'; Al-Houni 60' (pen.)

Alexandria Stadium, Alexandria

=== Group B ===
Team	Pld	W	D	L	GF	GA	GD	Pts
Syria	2	1	1	0	3	1	+2	4
Jordan	2	1	0	1	5	4	+1	3
Lebanon	2	0	1	1	1	4	–3	1

1 August 1953

Syria	3–1	Jordan
Al-Aqqad 28', 75'; Yaqoub 35'		Ynal Hikmat 15'

Alexandria

3 August 1953

Jordan	4–1	Lebanon
Ynal Hikmat (?) (?); Shehada musa (?); Krikor (?)		Abou Murad (?)

Alexandria

6 August 1953

Syria	0–0	Lebanon

Alexandria

== Knockout stage ==
Fifth place
8 August – Alexandria
Lebanon	9
Palestine	1

Final
9 August – Alexandria
Egypt	4
Syria	0
Third place
9 August – Alexandria
Libya	3
Jordan	2

=== Fifth place match ===
8 August 1953

Lebanon	9–1	Palestine
Goal		Goal

Alexandria

=== Third place match ===
9 August 1953

Libya	3–2	Jordan
Al-Ghannai 60'; Al-Zantouni 76' (pen.); Shenouan 89'		Ynal Hikmat; Shehada Musa

Alexandria Stadium, Alexandria

=== Final ===
9 August 1953

Egypt	4–0	Syria
Ad-Diba 25', 66'; El-Dhizui 75'; Rous 88'

Alexandria Stadium, Alexandria
Referee: Joseph Nalbadian (Lebanon)

== Final ranking ==
Rank	Team	Pld	W	D	L	GF	GA	GD	Pts
1	Egypt	3	3	0	0	22	3	+19	6
2	Syria	3	1	1	1	3	5	−2	3
3	Libya	3	2	0	1	10	14	−4	4
4	Jordan	3	1	0	2	7	7	0	3
5	Lebanon	3	1	1	1	14	5	+9	4
6	Palestine	3	0	0	3	4	22	−18	0
Total		18	8	2	8	60	56	+4	20
