= Mohamed Rifai =

Egyptian footballer (born 1939)

Personal information
- Full name: Mohamed Rifai El-Sayed
- Date of birth: 7 August 1939 (age 87)
- Place of birth: Cairo, Egypt
- Position: Midfielder

International career
Years	Team	Apps	(Gls)
- Egypt

Mohamed Rifai El-Sayed (Arabic: مُحَمَّد رِفَاعِيّ السَّيِّد; born 7 August 1939) is an Egyptian former footballer. He competed in the men's tournament at the 1960 Summer Olympics.
