= 1959 African Cup of Nations =

2nd edition of the Africa Cup of Nations

Coordinates: 30°03′N 31°14′E

1959 كأس أمم أفريقيا 1959 Kaʼs amm Afrīqiyā

Tournament details
- Host country: United Arab Republic
- Dates: 22–29 May
- Teams: 3
- Venue: 1 (in 1 host city)

Final positions
- Champions: United Arab Republic (2nd title)
- Runners-up: Sudan
- Third place: Ethiopia

Tournament statistics
- Matches played: 3
- Goals scored: 8 (2.67 per match)
- Attendance: 80,000 (26,667 per match)
- Top scorer(s): (United Arab Republic) Mahmoud El-Gohary (3 goals)
- Best player: (United Arab Republic) Ad-Diba

The 1959 African Cup of Nations was the second edition of the African Cup of Nations, the football championship between the national teams of Africa, organised by the Confederation of African Football (CAF). It was hosted and won by the United Arab Republic, a sovereign union between Egypt and Syria. Only three teams participated: host team United Arab Republic, Sudan, and Ethiopia. All three matches took place in Cairo.

== Overview ==
With only three teams, the format changed into a round robin group, but the results were the same, the United Arab Republic won over Ethiopia 4−0 and over Sudan 2−1. The Sudanese finished second, defeating Ethiopia 1−0.

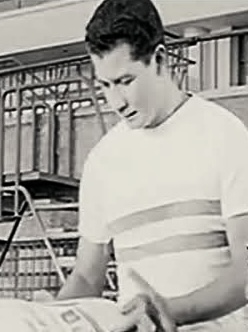
Essam Baheeg scored the two winning goals for Egypt in the final

Mahmoud El-Gohary, who would later become manager of the Egyptian team between 1988 and 2002, would be the top scorer of this edition of the tournament.

== Participating teams ==
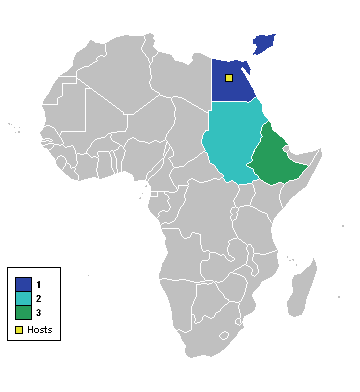
Participating nations

Team	Qualified as	Qualified on	Previous appearances in tournament (Note: Bold indicates champion for that year, Italic indicates host.)
United Arab Republic	Hosts	1957	1 (**1957**)
Ethiopia	Invitee	1957	1 (1957)
Sudan	Invitee	1957	1 (1957)

== Venues ==
Cairo
Prince Farouk Stadium
Capacity: **25,000**

== Final tournament ==
Team	Pld	W	D	L	GF	GA	GD	Pts	Result
United Arab Republic (H)	2	2	0	0	6	1	+5	**4**	Champion
Sudan	2	1	0	1	2	2	0	**2**	
Ethiopia	2	0	0	2	0	5	−5	**0**	

(H) Hosts

Win=2 Points

22 May 1959

United Arab Republic	4–0	Ethiopia
El-Gohary 29', 42', 73'; El-Sherbini 64'	Report

Prince Farouk Stadium, Cairo
Attendance: 30,000
Referee: Zivko Bajic (Yugoslavia)

25 May 1959

Sudan	1–0	Ethiopia
Dareesa 40'	Report

Prince Farouk Stadium, Cairo
Attendance: 20,000
Referee: M. Tsissis (Greece)

29 May 1959

United Arab Republic	2–1	Sudan
Baheeg 12', 89'	Report	Manzul 65'

Prince Farouk Stadium, Cairo
Attendance: 30,000
Referee: Zivko Bajic (Yugoslavia)

== Goalscorers ==
There were 8 goals scored in 3 matches, for an average of 2.67 goals per match.

3 goals

- (United Arab Republic) Mahmoud El-Gohary

2 goals

- (United Arab Republic) Essam Baheeg

1 goal

- (United Arab Republic) Mimi El-Sherbini
- (Sudan) Abdelmutaleb Naser Dareesa
- (Sudan) Siddiq Manzul
