= 1957 African Cup of Nations =

1st edition of the Africa Cup of Nations

1957 كأس أمم أفريقيا 1957 Kaʼs amm Afrīqiyā

Tournament details
- Host country: Sudan
- Dates: 10–16 February
- Teams: 3
- Venue: 1

Final positions
- Champions: Egypt (1st title)
- Runners-up: Ethiopia
- Third place: Sudan

Tournament statistics
- Matches played: 2
- Goals scored: 7 (3.5 per match)
- Attendance: 60,000 (30,000 per match)
- Top scorer: (Egypt) Ad-Diba (5 goals)
- Best player: (Egypt) Ad-Diba

The 1957 African Cup of Nations was the inaugural edition of the African Cup of Nations, the football championship of Africa organised by the Confederation of African Football (CAF). The competition was hosted by Sudan and took place between 10 and 16 February 1957.

Only three teams took part in the first edition of the tournament: Egypt, Ethiopia and Sudan. South Africa, which had originally entered, was disqualified due to its refusal to enter a multi-racial team, so only two matches took place. Both matches were played at the Municipal Stadium in the Sudanese capital Khartoum.

Egypt defeated Ethiopia 4–0 in the final, becoming the inaugural African football champions.

== Context ==
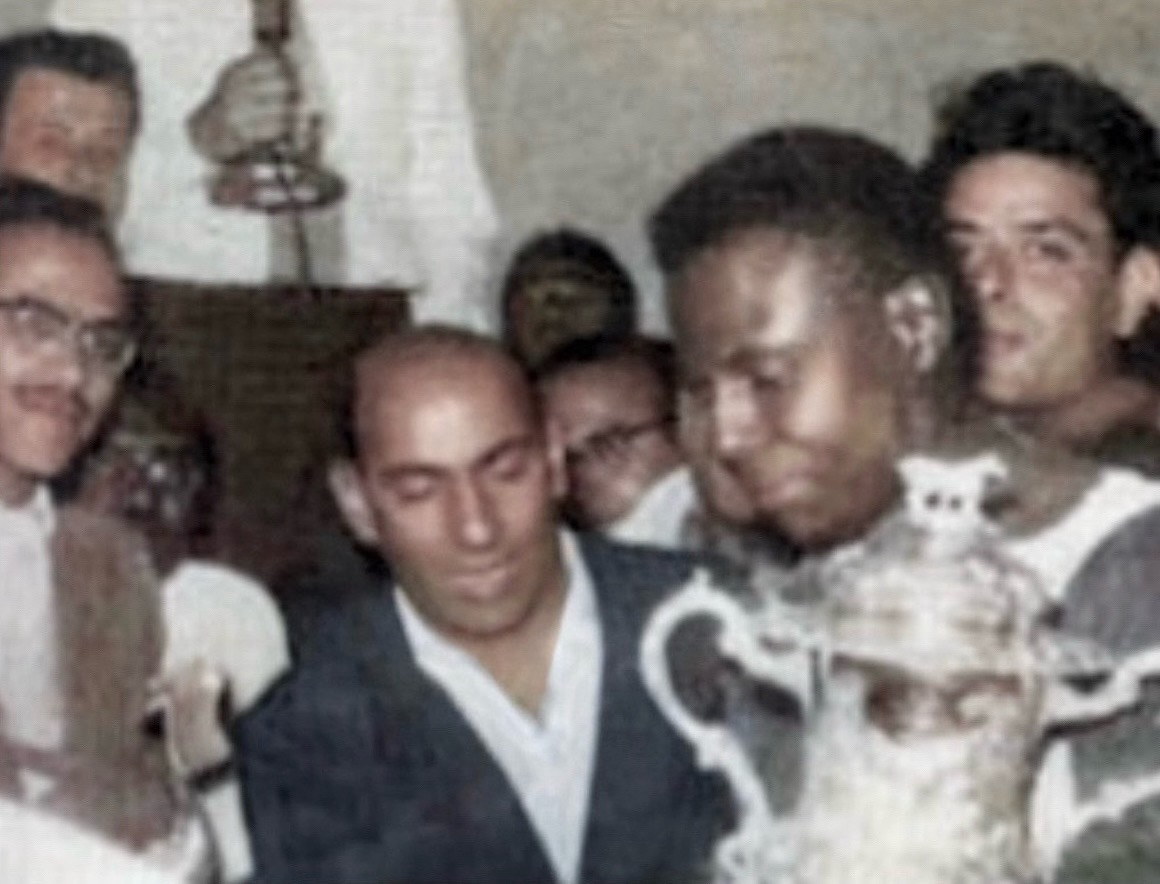
Egypt's captain Hanafy Bastan carrying the African Cup of Nations trophy in 1957

On the African continent, South Africa created the South African Football Association in 1892, then joined FIFA in 1910, before leaving in 1924 and returning in 1952. Then, Egypt created its federation on 3 December 1921 and joined FIFA in 1923; then Sudan created its federation while it was under Anglo-Egyptian domination in 1936 and joined FIFA in 1948. Finally, Ethiopia created its federation in 1943 and joined FIFA under the name of Abyssinia in 1952. These were the first nations to organize themselves into an independent selection and to join FIFA.

The integration of these four African nations into FIFA was incomplete and this was evident in the organisation of the World Cup qualifiers: in 1934, only Egypt took part in the World Cup qualifiers (against Mandatory Palestine) in the Africa–Asia group and took part in the 1934 World Cup, making it the first African nation in the World Cup. In 1938, Egypt was transferred to a European group but withdrew. In 1950, no team was registered and in 1954, only Egypt played in the qualifiers in the European zone against Italy. The involvement of African teams in the qualifiers was either with Asia or Europe and this led to the idea of creating an African confederation.

== Overview ==
South Africa was drawn to play Ethiopia in the semi-finals, but were disqualified due to apartheid. Ethiopia therefore had a bye to the final, whilst in the other semi-final at Municipal Stadium in Khartoum, the Egyptians beat the host nation 2–1. In the final, Egypt beat Ethiopia 4–0, with all four goals scored by El-Diba, who finished the tournament as top scorer with five goals. Only two games were played in this first edition.

== Participating teams ==
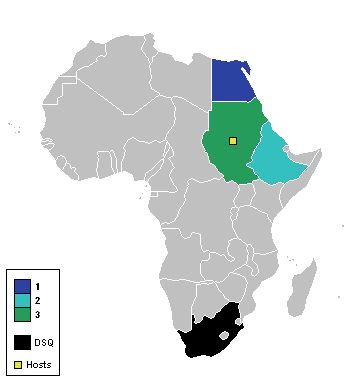
Result of teams participating: Champion Runner-up Third place

Four teams were due to take part in the tournament: Egypt, Sudan, Ethiopia and South Africa, but South Africa was disqualified as they refused to field a multi-racial team due to the country's apartheid laws.

Team	Qualified as	Qualified on
Sudan	Hosts	8 July 1956
Egypt	Invitee	8 July 1956
Ethiopia	Invitee	8 July 1956

== Venues ==
Khartoum	1957 African Cup of Nations is located in Sudan (2005-2011)
Municipal Stadium	1957 African Cup of Nations is located in Sudan (2005-2011)
Capacity: 30,000	1957 African Cup of Nations is located in Sudan (2005-2011)

== Final tournament ==
=== Semi-finals ===
10 February 1957

Sudan	1–2	Egypt
Bashir 58'		Attia 21' (pen.); Ad-Diba 72'

Municipal Stadium, Khartoum
Attendance: 30,000
Referee: Gebeyehu Doube (Ethiopia)

10 February 1957

Ethiopia	w/o	South Africa

The match was cancelled and Ethiopia advanced to the final after South Africa were disqualified for refusing to field a multi-racial team due to apartheid.

=== Final ===
16 February 1957

Egypt	4–0	Ethiopia
Ad-Diba 2', 7', 68', 89'

Municipal Stadium, Khartoum
Attendance: 30,000
Referee: Mohammed Youssef (Sudan)

== Goalscorers ==
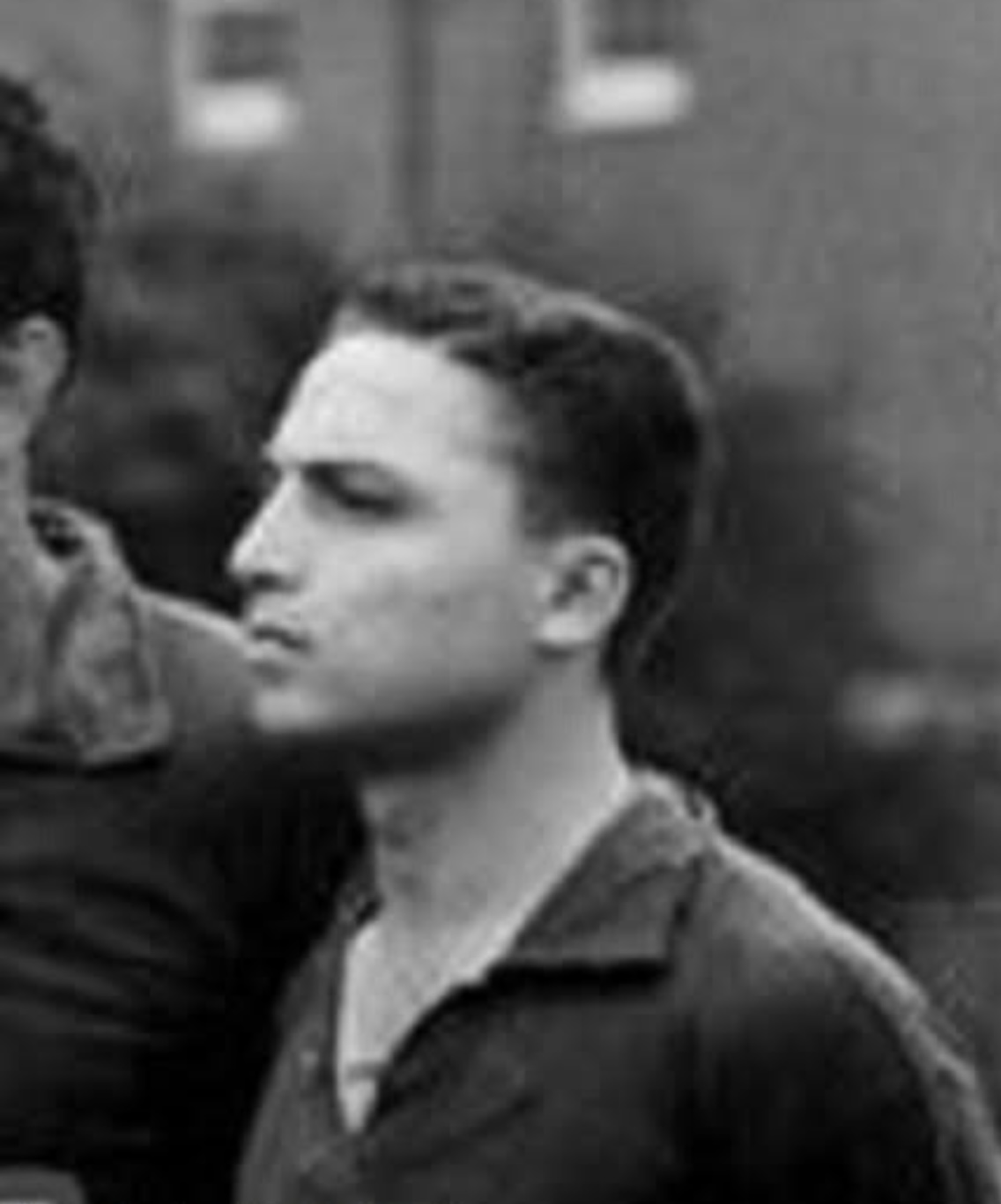
Ad-Diba, top scorer

There were 2 goals scored in 7 matches, for an average of 0.286 goals per match.

5 goals

- Ad-Diba – four of the five goals were scored in Egypt's 4–0 defeat of Ethiopia in the final.

1 goal

- (Egypt) Raafat Attia – first ever goal scorer in Africa Cup of Nations.
- Boraî Bashir — "some sources report the Sudan goal-scorer as Seddiq Mohammed Manzul, but contemporary reports mention that "Seddiq passed the ball to Boraî who scored."
