= 1972 Palestine Cup of Nations squads =

Below are the squads for the 1972 Palestine Cup of Nations, hosted in Iraq, and which took place between 1 and 25 January 1972.

== Group A ==
=== Egypt ===
Head coach:

No.	Pos.	Player	Date of birth (age)	Club
	GK	Hassan Mokhtar	26 January 1944 (aged 27)	(Egyptian Football Association) Ismaily SC
	GK	Hassan Ali		(Egyptian Football Association) Tersana SC
	DF	El-Bouri		(Egyptian Football Association) El-Olympi
	DF	Mohamed El-Seyagui	20 January 1949 (aged 22)	(Egyptian Football Association) Ghazl El-Mahalla
	DF	Mimi Darwish	20 March 1942 (aged 29)	(Egyptian Football Association) Ismaily SC
	DF	Bobbo		(Egyptian Football Association) Al-Ittihad Alexandria
	DF	Mohamed Tawfik		(Egyptian Football Association) Zamalek SC
	MF	Farouk Gaafar	29 October 1952 (aged 19)	(Egyptian Football Association) Zamalek SC
	MF	Farouk ُEl-Sayed		(Egyptian Football Association) Zamalek SC
	MF	Shehta El-Iskandarani		(Egyptian Football Association) Al-Ittihad Alexandria
	FW	Hassan El-Shazly	13 November 1943 (aged 28)	(Egyptian Football Association) Tersana SC
	FW	Moustafa Reyadh	5 April 1941 (aged 30)	(Egyptian Football Association) Tersana SC
	MF	Mohammed Abo El-Ezz		(Egyptian Football Association) Tersana SC
	FW	Abdel Aziz Abdel Shafy	25 December 1952 (aged 19)	(Egyptian Football Association) Al-Ahly
	FW	Mohamed El-Tarafawi		(Egyptian Football Association) El-Olympi
	FW	Mohamed Omasha		(Egyptian Football Association) Ghazl El-Mahalla
	FW	Adel El-Bably		(Egyptian Football Association) Al-Ittihad Alexandria
	FW	Ali Abo Greisha	29 November 1948 (aged 23)	(Egyptian Football Association) Ismaily SC
	FW	Sayed "Bazouka" Abdelrazak	1 July 1946 (aged 25)	(Egyptian Football Association) Ismaily SC
	FW	Farouk El-Sayed	18 October 1944 (aged 27)	(Egyptian Football Association) Zamalek SC

=== Iraq ===
Head coach: Adil Basher

No.	Pos.	Player	Date of birth (age)	Club
	GK	Sattar Khalaf	1 July 1946 (aged 25)	(Iraq Football Association) Al-Shorta
	GK	Jalal Abdul-Rahman	6 May 1946 (aged 25)	(Iraq Football Association) Al-Zawra'a
	DF	Abd Kadhim		(Iraq Football Association) Al-Zawra'a
	DF	Douglas Aziz	1 January 1942 (aged 30)	(Iraq Football Association) Al-Shorta
	DF	Sahib Khazal	1 January 1943 (aged 29)	(Iraq Football Association) Al-Quwa Al-Jawiya
	DF	Mujbil Fartoos		(Iraq Football Association) Al-Quwa Al-Jawiya
	DF	Sbaiah Abd Ali		(Iraq Football Association) Al-Mina'a
	MF	Shamil Kamil	1 July 1947 (aged 24)	(Iraq Football Association) Al-Jamiea
	MF	Abdel Samad Asad		
	MF	Shidrak Yousif	1942	(Iraq Football Association) Al-Quwa Al-Jawiya
	MF	Abdel-Razzak Ahmed		
	FW	Ali Kadhim	1 January 1949 (aged 23)	(Iraq Football Association) Al-Zawra'a
	FW	Sabah Hatem	1 July 1950 (aged 21)	(Iraq Football Association) Al-Shorta
	FW	Riad Noori		(Iraq Football Association) Al-Shorta
	FW	Falah Hassan	1 July 1951 (aged 20)	(Iraq Football Association) Al-Zawra'a
	MF	Salah Ibrahim	1 July 1947 (aged 24)	
	FW	Sabah Noori		
	MF	Qasim Mohamed		
	MF	Jamal Salih	1946	(Iraq Football Association) Al-Jamiea

== Group B ==
=== Algeria ===
Head coach: Rachid Mekhloufi

No.	Pos.	Player	Date of birth (age)	Club
	GK	Salah Hanchi	27 July 1946 (aged 25)	(Algerian Football Federation) CS Constantine
	GK	Kamel Tahir	11 January 1945 (aged 26)	(Algerian Football Federation) JS Kabylie
	DF	Mohamed Khedis	29 February 1952 (aged 19)	(Algerian Football Federation) NA Hussein Dey
	DF	Mohamed Madani	23 May 1945 (aged 26)	(Algerian Football Federation) OMR El Annasser
	DF	Miloud Salhi	20 July 1951 (aged 20)	(Algerian Football Federation) USM Bel Abbès
	DF	Tahar Benferhat	23 March 1944 (aged 27)	(Algerian Football Federation) JSM Tiaret
	MF	Ahmed Amar	23 June 1951 (aged 20)	(Algerian Football Federation) USM Bel Abbès
	MF	Mourad Barkat	20 June 1950 (aged 21)	(Algerian Football Federation) MO Constantine
	MF	Mustapha Dahleb	8 February 1952 (aged 19)	(French Football Federation) CS Sedan
	MF	Abdelhafid Fendi	29 May 1951 (aged 20)	(Algerian Football Federation) MO Constantine
	MF	Mohand Chérif Hannachi	2 April 1950 (aged 21)	(Algerian Football Federation) JS Kabylie
	MF	Abdelhamid Salhi	27 August 1947 (aged 24)	(Algerian Football Federation) ES Sétif
	MF	Youcef Zender	12 September 1950 (aged 21)	(Algerian Football Federation) MSP Batna
	FW	Omar Betrouni	3 November 1949 (aged 22)	(Algerian Football Federation) MC Alger
	FW	Rabah Gamouh	21 January 1952 (aged 19)	(Algerian Football Federation) MO Constantine
	FW	Rachid Dali	30 December 1947 (aged 24)	(Algerian Football Federation) JSM Béjaïa
	FW	Abdelmadjid Krokro	29 May 1951 (aged 20)	(Algerian Football Federation) MO Constantine
	FW	Abdelhalim Belkaïm	29 September 1941 (aged 30)	

=== Palestine ===
Head coach:

No.	Pos.	Player	Date of birth (age)	Club
1		Ali El Sharaw		
2		Houssain Atyeh		
8		Ibrahim Mahher		
10		Fady Chourr		
		...		
