= South Yemen national football team results =

This page details the match results and statistics of the South Yemen national football team.

== Key ==
Key to matches

- Att.=Match attendance
- (H)=Home ground
- (A)=Away ground
- (N)=Neutral ground

Key to record by opponent

- Pld=Games played
- W=Games won
- D=Games drawn
- L=Games lost
- GF=Goals for
- GA=Goals against

== Results ==
South Yemen's score is shown first in each case.

No.	Date	Venue	Opponents	Score	Competition	South Yemen scorers	Att.	Ref.
1	1 January 1972	Al-Shaab Stadium, Baghdad (N)	Syria	0–1	1972 Palestine Cup of Nations		—	
2	6 January 1972	Al-Shaab Stadium, Baghdad (N)	Palestine	2–1	1972 Palestine Cup of Nations	Unknown	—	
3	8 January 1972	Al-Shaab Stadium, Baghdad (N)	Qatar	2–1	1972 Palestine Cup of Nations	Unknown	—	
4	10 January 1972	Al-Shaab Stadium, Baghdad (N)	Algeria	1–4	1972 Palestine Cup of Nations	Unknown	—	
5	16 May 1972	Aden (H)	China	1–6	Friendly	Unknown	—	
6	27 May 1972	Aden (H)	China	2–5	Friendly	Unknown	—	
7	12 August 1973	28 March Stadium, Benghazi (N)	Iraq	0–2	1973 Palestine Cup of Nations		—	
8	14 August 1973	28 March Stadium, Benghazi (N)	Libya	0–10	1973 Palestine Cup of Nations		—	
9	16 August 1973	28 March Stadium, Benghazi (N)	United Arab Emirates	0–0	1973 Palestine Cup of Nations		—	
10	18 August 1973	28 March Stadium, Benghazi (N)	Algeria	1–15	1973 Palestine Cup of Nations	Unknown	—	
11	2 May 1974	Aden (H)	Iraq	2–0	Friendly	Unknown	—	
12	10 July 1974	Beijing (A)	China	5–6	Friendly	Unknown	—	
13	19 December 1975	Stade El Menzah, Tunis (N)	Egypt	0–5	1975 Palestine Cup of Nations		—	
14	21 December 1975	Stade El Menzah, Tunis (N)	Saudi Arabia	1–0	1975 Palestine Cup of Nations	Al-Mass	—	
15	6 June 1976	Azadi Stadium, Tehran (N)	Iraq	0–1	1976 AFC Asian Cup		—	
16	8 June 1976	Azadi Stadium, Tehran (N)	Iran	0–8	1976 AFC Asian Cup		50,000	
17	10 October 1976	Abbasiyyin Stadium, Damascus (N)	Syria	2–1	1976 Pan Arab Games	Unknown	—	
18	12 October 1976	Abbasiyyin Stadium, Damascus (N)	Mauritania	2–0	1976 Pan Arab Games	Unknown	—	
19	14 October 1976	Abbasiyyin Stadium, Damascus (N)	Morocco	0–4	1976 Pan Arab Games		—	
20	16 October 1976	Abbasiyyin Stadium, Damascus (N)	Saudi Arabia	1–0	1976 Pan Arab Games	Saif	—	
21	18 October 1976	Abbasiyyin Stadium, Damascus (N)	Palestine	0–0	1976 Pan Arab Games		—	
22	20 October 1976	Abbasiyyin Stadium, Damascus (N)	Jordan	2–3	1976 Pan Arab Games	Unknown	—	
23	19 March 1980	Al-Shaab Stadium, Baghdad (N)	Jordan	2–1	1980 Summer Olympics qualification	Unknown	—	
24	22 March 1980	Al-Shaab Stadium, Baghdad (N)	Kuwait	1–5	1980 Summer Olympics qualification	Unknown	—	
25	25 March 1980	Al-Shaab Stadium, Baghdad (N)	Syria	1–2	1980 Summer Olympics qualification	Unknown	—	
26	28 March 1980	Al-Shaab Stadium, Baghdad (N)	Iraq	0–3	1980 Summer Olympics qualification		—	
27	17 May 1981	Addis Ababa (A)	Ethiopia	1–1	Friendly	Unknown	—	
28	21 November 1982	Ambedkar Stadium, New Delhi (N)	South Korea	0–3	1982 Asian Games		—	
29	23 November 1982	Jawaharlal Nehru Stadium, New Delhi (N)	Japan	1–3	1982 Asian Games	Mehdi	—	
30	25 November 1982	Ambedkar Stadium, New Delhi (N)	Iran	0–2	1982 Asian Games		—	
31	January 1983	Saudi Arabia (N)	Sudan	0–1	Friendly		—	
32	29 March 1985	Mortayer Yard, Aden (H)	Bahrain	1–4	1986 FIFA World Cup qualification	Al-Mass	19,082	
33	12 April 1985	Bahrain National Stadium, Riffa (A)	Bahrain	3–3	1986 FIFA World Cup qualification	Shadli, Abdullah, Al-Sabou	3,216	
34	26 February 1988	Djibouti (A)	Djibouti	1–4	Friendly	Unknown	—	
35	17 June 1988	Jakarta (N)	Indonesia	0–1	1988 AFC Asian Cup qualification		—	
36	19 June 1988	Jakarta (N)	South Korea	1–1	1988 AFC Asian Cup qualification	Saleh	—	
37	22 June 1988	Jakarta (N)	Bahrain	0–2	1988 AFC Asian Cup qualification		—	
38	1 November 1989	Al-Sadaqua Walsalam Stadium, Kuwait City (N)	Iran	0–2	1989 Peace and Friendship Cup		15,000	
39	3 November 1989	Al-Sadaqua Walsalam Stadium, Kuwait City (N)	Iraq	2–6	1989 Peace and Friendship Cup	Hussein (2)	24,800	
40	5 November 1989	Al-Sadaqua Walsalam Stadium, Kuwait City (N)	Guinea	1–0	1989 Peace and Friendship Cup	Hussein	8,500	

Notes

1. Note 1: In 1990, South Yemen united with North Yemen to form Yemen. For results after 1990, see Yemen national football team results.
2. A: The United Arab Emirates and South Yemen drew their match at the 1973 Palestine Cup of Nations, however the exact score is unknown.

== Record by opponent ==
Team	Pld	W	D	L	GF	GA	GD	WPCT
Algeria	2	0	0	2	2	19	−17	0.00
Bahrain	3	0	1	2	4	9	−5	0.00
China	3	0	0	3	8	17	−9	0.00
Djibouti	1	0	0	1	1	4	−3	0.00
Egypt	1	0	0	1	0	5	−5	0.00
Ethiopia	1	0	1	0	1	1	0	0.00
Guinea	1	1	0	0	1	0	+1	100.00
Indonesia	1	0	0	1	0	1	−1	0.00
Iraq	5	1	0	4	4	12	−8	20.00
Iran	3	0	0	3	0	12	−12	0.00
Japan	1	0	0	1	1	3	−2	0.00
Jordan	2	1	0	1	4	4	0	50.00
Kuwait	1	0	0	1	1	5	−4	0.00
Libya	1	0	0	1	0	10	−10	0.00
Mauritania	1	1	0	0	2	0	+2	100.00
Morocco	1	0	0	1	0	4	−4	0.00
Palestine	2	1	1	0	2	1	+1	50.00
Qatar	1	1	0	0	2	1	+1	100.00
Saudi Arabia	2	2	0	0	2	0	+2	100.00
South Korea	2	0	1	1	1	4	−3	0.00
Sudan	1	0	0	1	0	1	−1	0.00
Syria	3	1	0	2	3	4	−1	33.33
United Arab Emirates	1	0	1	0	0	0	0	0.00
Total	40	9	5	26	39	117	−78	22.50

Source: Results
