= Nasr Al-Shazly =

Yemeni former footballer and manager

Personal information
- Full name: Nasr Abdulrahman Al-Shazly
- Place of birth: Aden, Aden Protectorate
- Positions: Forward; winger; defender

Youth career
- Al-Husseini SC

Senior career*
Years	Team	Apps	(Gls)
1957–1959	Al-Husseini SC		
1958	Al-Aidaroos Club		
1962–1967	Al-Shabab SC		

International career
1963–1965	Aden		

Managerial career
- 1972: South Yemen
- * Club domestic league appearances and goals

Nasr Abdulrahman Al-Shazly (Arabic: نصر عبدالرحمن الشاذلي) is a Yemeni former footballer and manager.

== Playing career ==
Al-Shazly started his career in Crater with Al-Husseini Sports Club, where he played in various positions for the club's senior team between 1957 and 1959. In 1958, he also played for Al-Aidaroos Club. In 1962, he joined Al-Shabab Sports Club, where he formed an attacking quartet with Ibrahim Abdullah Saidi, Ghazi Awad Mubarak, and Nasr Al-Sayyad.

While at Al-Shabab, he served as a player, coach, and club president simultaneously. Additionally, he played for them against Sudanese side Al-Mourada, who visited Aden in 1963, as well as against various Egyptian clubs during their tour of the country. However, his career was cut short following a spinal injury, forcing him to retire in 1967.

In 1963, on the one-year anniversary of the 26 September Revolution, he became one of the first people to help with the formation of the Aden national team (later known as South Yemen), who he represented between 1963 and 1965, and was one of the team's most important players.

== Style of play ==
Al-Shazly was a playmaker, who was known for his speed, precise passes to teammates, and his ambidextrous ability.

== Post-playing career ==
After retiring, Al-Shazly was elected the first president of the PDR Yemen Football Federation, following South Yemen's independence. In January 1972, he served as the manager of the South Yemen national team at the 1972 Palestine Cup of Nations. He later served as the president of both the South Yemen Basketball and Volleyball federations.

Additionally, he served in various government roles, including as the first advisor on sports affairs to the Prime Minister of South Yemen prior to unification, and an advisor to the Ministry of Youth and Sports after unification, as well as a member of the first People's Assembly, representing the Youth and Sports sector.

In 2013, the Ministry of Youth and Sports announced that Al-Tilal SC's stadium was to be named after him.

== Personal life ==
He is the uncle of former Yemeni footballer Wagdan Shadli. In 2018, shortly before the FIFA World Cup match between Belgium and Japan, Yemeni Twitter users began falsely claiming that Nacer Chadli was related to Al-Shazly.
