= Badawi Abdel Fattah =

Egyptian footballer (1935-2007)

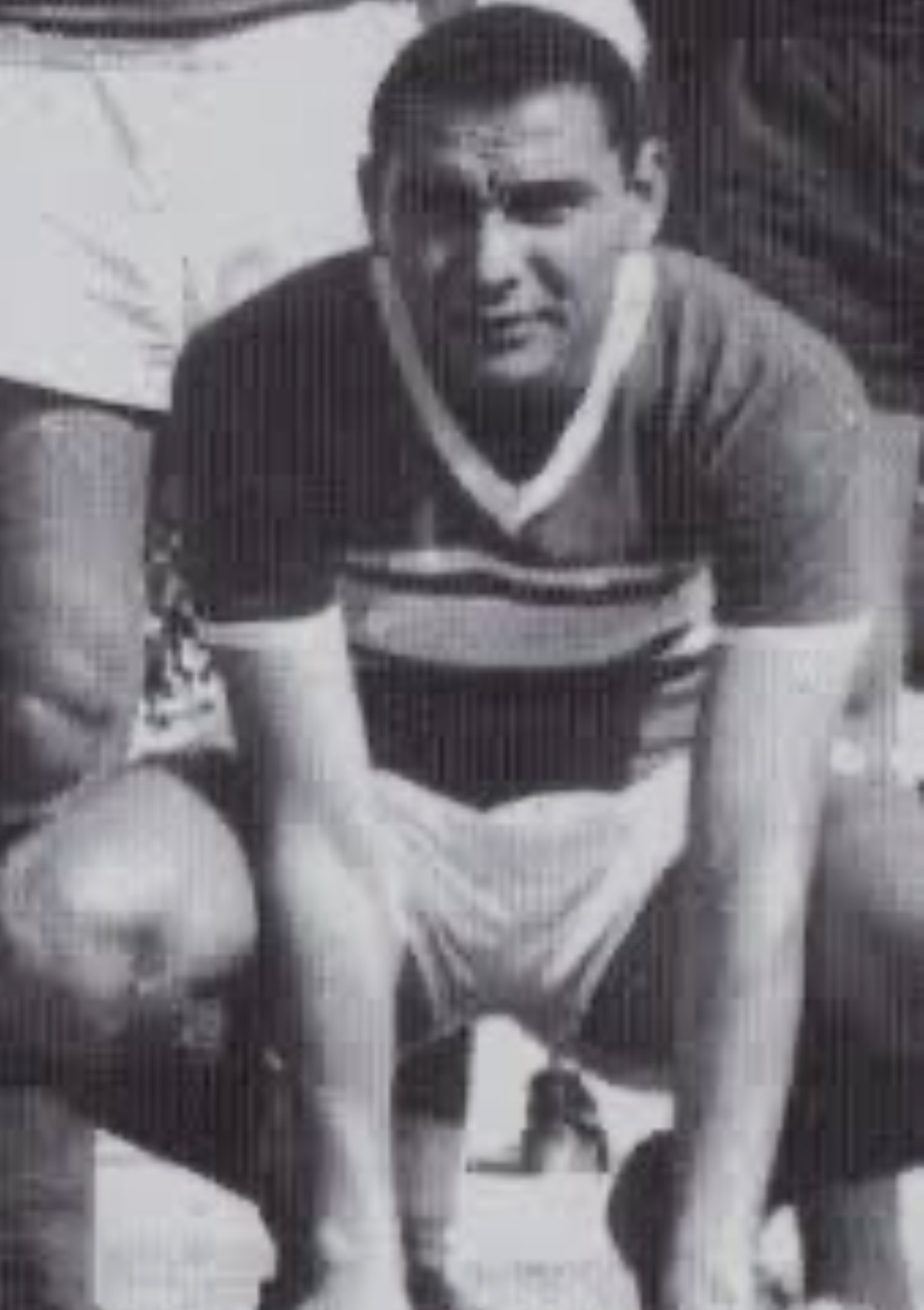
- Abdel Fattah with Tersana in 1962

Personal information
- Full name: Mohamed Badawi Abdel Fattah
- Date of birth: 24 May 1935
- Place of birth: Port Said, Egypt
- Date of death: 6 December 2007 (aged 72)
- Place of death: Alexandria, Egypt
- Position: Midfielder

Youth career
- 1955–1957: Ismaily

Senior career*
Years	Team	Apps	(Gls)
1957–1964	Tersana		
1964–1972	El-Olympi		

International career
1960–1966	Egypt	27	(27)

Managerial career
- Tersana
- El-Olympi
Medal record
Men's football
Representing United Arab Republic
Africa Cup of Nations
Runner-up	1962 Ethiopia
Arab Games
Gold medal – first place	1965
- * Club domestic league appearances and goals

Mohamed Badawi Abdel Fattah (Arabic: محمد بدوي عبد الفتاح, born 24 May 1935 – 6 December 2007), better known as Badawi Abdel Fattah, was an Egyptian football player and coach who played as a midfielder for the Egypt national team. He took part in the 1962 Africa Cup of Nations, and was the tournament's joint top scorer. He also represented his country in the 1964 Summer Olympics.

== Playing career ==
=== Club career ===
Abdel Fattah was born on 3 October 1940 in Port Said, Egypt. He began his football career in the youth team of Ismaily before joining the Tersana in 1957. He won with Tersana their first and only Egyptian Premier League title in the 1962–63 season. In 1964, Abdel Fattah moved to El Olympi, where he helped his new team winning their first and only Egyptian Premier League title in the 1965–66 season.

Abdel Fattah’s two goals against Portuguese club Benfica are among his most famous of all. Al Ahly hired him in 1962 to play with the team against Benfica, the European champion at that time in a friendly match at Cairo Stadium. Abdel Fattah excelled and scored two goals, and Al Ahly won with a score of 3–2.

=== International career ===
Abdel Fattah represented his country in the 1962 African Cup of Nations in Ethiopia and Egypt finished as runners up. He also played with Egypt at the 1964 Summer Olympics in Tokyo, where Egypt finished in the fourth place. He won was a part of the team that won the gold medal at the 1965 Arab Games in Cairo. He played for his country from 1960 to 1966, Abdel Fattah has an outstanding record with 27 goals in 27 international caps. In 1972, he decided to retire from football.

== Later life and death ==
After his retirement, Abdel Fattah began his career as a head coach. He worked with Egyptian teams most notably his previous clubs, Tersana and El Olympi. He also worked as the head coach of the Egyptian national military team.

Abdel Fattah died on 6 December 2007 in Alexandria at the age of 67, after suffering from kidney failure for several months, as a result of the failure of a liver transplant.

== Honours ==
Tersana

- Egyptian Premier League: 1962–63

El-Olympi

- Egyptian Premier League: 1965–66

United Arab Republic

- African Cup of Nations: runner-up, 1962
- Arab Games: 1965

Individual

- Africa Cup of Nations top scorer: 1962 (shared with Luciano Vassallo)
