= Ahmed Rifaat =

Egyptian footballer and manager (1942–2017)

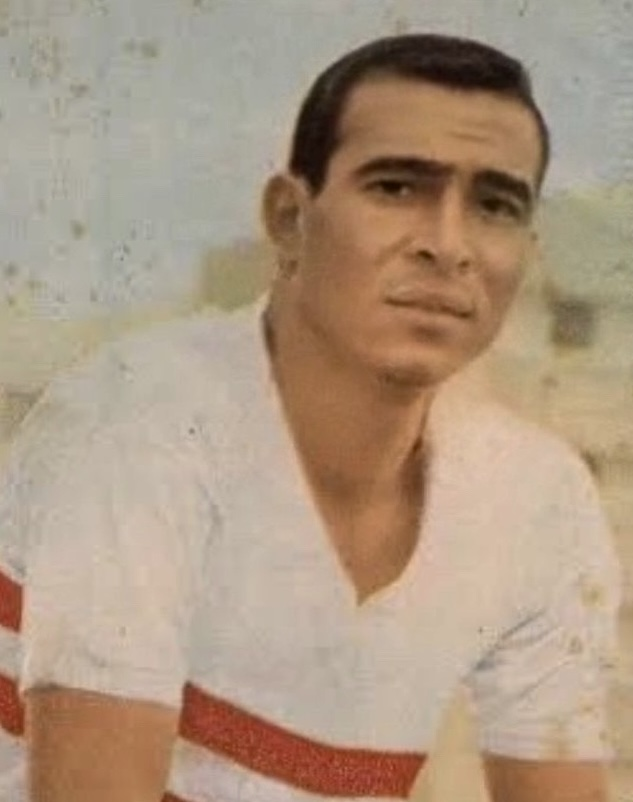
- Rifaat with Zamalek in 1967

Personal information
- Date of birth: 21 July 1942
- Place of birth: Bulaq, Cairo, Egypt
- Date of death: 13 December 2017 (aged 75)
- Place of death: Cairo, Egypt
- Positions: Midfielder; right-back

Senior career*
Years	Team	Apps	(Gls)
1961–1973	Zamalek		

International career
- Egypt

Managerial career
- 1996: Zamalek
- 1996: Al-Masry
- 1996–1997: Suez
- 1998–2001: Dina Farms
- 2001–2002: El Mokawloon
- 2003: Al-Majd
- 2003–2004: Syria
- 2005: Zamalek
- 2005–2006: Malkiya
- 2008–2009: Zamalek (Asst. Manager)
Medal record
Men's football
Representing Egypt
Africa Cup of Nations
Silver medal – second place	1962
Arab Games
Gold medal – first place	1965
African Games
Bronze medal – third place	1973
- * Club domestic league appearances and goals

Ahmed Rifaat (Arabic: أحمد رفعت; 21 July 1942 – 13 December 2017) was an Egyptian football coach and player, who was the head coach of Zamalek.

== Biography ==
Rifaat was born on 21 July 1942 in Bulaq, Cairo, Egypt. He started his professional football career in Zamalek in 1961, he won with his team the Egyptian Premier League title in (1963–64, 1964–65). He also won with Zamalek the Egypt Cup once in 1962. Rifaat played his whole career in Zamalek.

With Egypt, Rifaat played in the 1962 African Cup of Nations and Egypt finished second. He also was a part of the team that finished fourth in 1964 Summer Olympics in Tokyo. Rifaat played in the 1965 Arab Games in Cairo, and scored a goal against Aden, where Egypt won 14–0, the hosts won the gold medal. Rifaat retired in 1973.

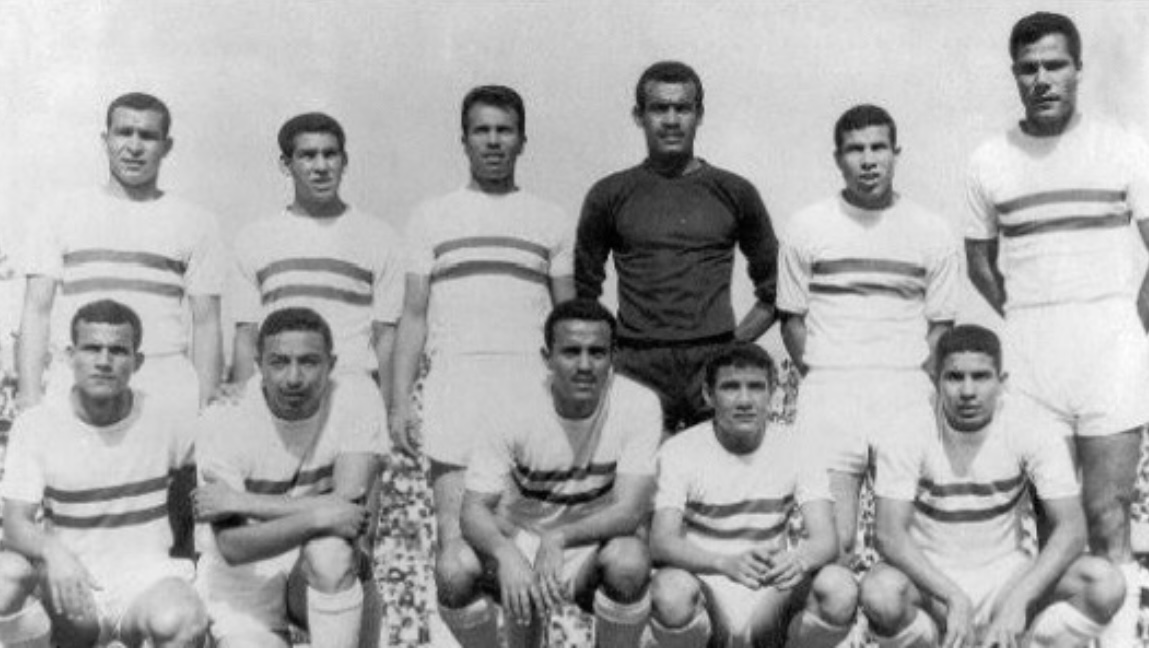
Rifaat (first standing from left) with Zamalek in 1964

After his retirement, Rifaat worked as a coach. In 1996, Rifaat was appointed as Zamalek's coach for a brief period, in the same year he coached Al Masry. In the 1996–1997, he coached Suez SC. He became the manager of Dina Farms in 1998, and coached the team for three seasons to 2001. He was appointed Al Mokaweloon for the 2001–02 season. He had brief spells in Al-Majd SC and the Syria national team. Afterwards, he was again Zamalek's manager for one season in 2005. He went to Bahrain, and managed the Bahraini side Malkiya in 2005–06. He was back to his home club and worked as Zamalek's assistant manager in 2008–09.

Rifaat died at the age of 75, on 13 December 2017 in Cairo.

== Honours ==
Zamalek

- Egyptian Premier League: 1963–64, 1964–65
- Egypt Cup: 1962

Egypt

- Africa Cup of Nations: runner-up 1962
- Summer Olympic Games: fourth place 1964
- Arab Games: Gold medal 1965
