= 1964–65 Egyptian Premier League =

Egyptian football league season

Egyptian Premier League
- Season: 1964–65
- Dates: 6 November 1964 – 11 June 1965
- Champions: Zamalek (3rd title)
- Relegated: Suez; El-Sawahel
- Matches played: 136
- Goals scored: 323 (2.38 per match)
- Top goalscorer: Hassan El-Shazly (23 goals)

The 1964–65 Egyptian Premier League, was the 15th season of the Egyptian Premier League, the top Egyptian professional league for association football clubs, since its establishment in 1948. The season started on 6 November 1964 and concluded on 11 June 1965. Zamalek won the league for the third time in the club's history.

== League table ==
=== Group 1 ===
Pos	Club	Pld	W	D	L	F	A	Pts
1	Zamalek (C)	22	15	5	2	41	15	35
2	Ismaily	22	13	2	7	35	28	28
3	Tersana	22	10	7	5	48	28	27
4	Al Ahly	22	9	7	6	26	25	25
5	Olympic	22	8	6	8	26	24	22
6	Ghazl El Mahalla	22	7	8	7	20	23	22
7	Al Masry	22	7	6	9	17	26	20
8	Al Ittihad	22	7	5	10	31	32	19
9	El Sekka El Hadid	22	5	8	9	19	24	18
10	El Qanah	22	4	8	10	17	27	16
11	Suez (R)	22	7	2	13	16	27	16
12	El-Sawahel (R)	22	5	6	11	17	34	16

(C)= Champion, (R)= Relegated, Pld = Matches played; W = Matches won; D = Matches drawn; L = Matches lost; F = Goals for; A = Goals against; ± = Goal difference; Pts = Points.

== Top goalscorers ==
Rank	Player	Club	Goals
1	(United Arab Republic) Hassan El-Shazly	Tersana	23
2	(United Arab Republic) Hamada Emam	Zamalek	18
3	(United Arab Republic) Ezz El-Din Yaqoub	Olympic Club	15
4	(United Arab Republic) Mohamed Seddeek	Ismaily	13
5	(United Arab Republic) Moustafa Reyadh	Tersana	12

== Teams ==
Locations of the 1964–65 Egyptian Premier League teams
