= 1965–66 Egyptian Premier League =

Egyptian football league season

Egyptian Premier League
- Season: 1965–66
- Dates: 1 October 1965 – 10 May 1966
- Champions: Olympic Club (1st title)
- Relegated: Suez; El Qanah
- Matches: 131
- Goals: 314 (2.4 per match)
- Top goalscorer: Hassan El-Shazly (19 goals)
- Biggest home win: Tersana 5–1 Al Ahly

The 1965–66 Egyptian Premier League, was the 16th season of the Egyptian Premier League, the top Egyptian professional league for association football clubs, since its establishment in 1948. The season started on 1 October 1965 and concluded on 10 May 1966. Olympic Club won the league for the first time in the club's history.

== League table ==
Pos	Club	Pld	W	D	L	F	A	Pts
1	Olympic Club (C)	21	13	4	4	40	21	30
2	Zamalek	21	10	6	5	37	19	26
3	Ismaily	21	9	7	5	32	27	25
4	Tersana	21	9	5	7	37	27	23
5	Ghazl El Mahalla	21	7	8	6	20	17	22
6	Al Ahly	21	7	7	7	27	25	21
7	Al Masry	21	8	4	9	23	28	20
8	El Sekka El Hadid	21	5	9	7	25	29	19
9	Al Ittihad	21	6	6	9	21	25	18
10	Aviation	21	2	10	9	8	30	14
11	Ittihad Suez (R)	21	4	5	12	16	38	13
12	El Qanah (R)	11	4	3	4	11	11	11

(C)= Champion, (R)= Relegated, Pld = Matches played; W = Matches won; D = Matches drawn; L = Matches lost; F = Goals for; A = Goals against; ± = Goal difference; Pts = Points.

El Qanah were relegated, and 2nd round results were cancelled after withdrawal in their last match.

== Top goalscorers ==
Rank	Player	Club	Goals
1	(United Arab Republic) Hassan El-Shazly	Tersana	18
2	(United Arab Republic) Ezz El-Din Yaqoub	Olympic Club	16
3	(United Arab Republic) Mohamed Shahin	Al Masry	13
4	(United Arab Republic) Hamada Emam	Zamalek	11
5	(United Arab Republic) Moustafa Reyadh	Tersana	10

== Teams ==
Locations of the 1965–66 Egyptian Premier League teams
