= Hassan El-Shazly =

Egyptian footballer (1943–2015)

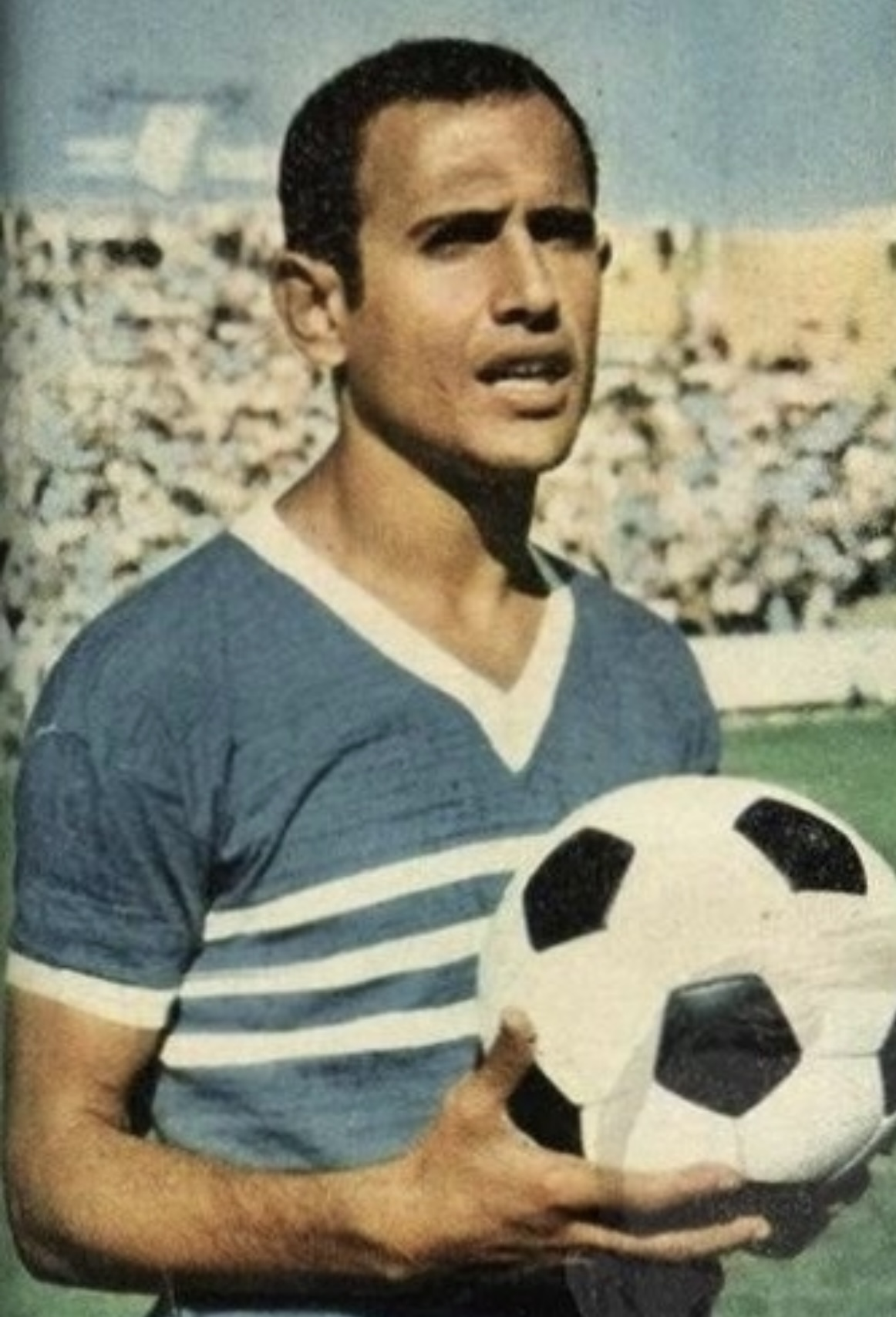
- El-Shazly with Tersana in 1965

Personal information
- Full name: Hassan Ahmed El-Shazly
- Date of birth: 20 May 1943
- Place of birth: Kingdom of Egypt
- Date of death: 20 April 2015 (aged 71)
- Place of death: Giza, Egypt
- Height: 5 ft 8 in (1.73 m)
- Positions: Midfielder; forward

Senior career*
Years	Team	Apps	(Gls)
1959–1978	Tersana		(173)

International career
1961–1975	Egypt	64	(49)

Managerial career
- 2000–2001: Tersana
- 2002–2003: Al-Ittihad (Aleppo)
- 2003: Tersana
- 2009–2010: Tersana
Medal record
Men's football
Representing United Arab Republic
Africa Cup of Nations
Third place	1963 Ghana
Third place	1970 Sudan
Arab Games
Gold medal – first place	1965
Representing Egypt
Africa Cup of Nations
Third place	1974 Egypt
- * Club domestic league appearances and goals

Hassan Ahmed El-Shazly (Arabic: حسن أحمد الشاذلي; 13 November 1943 – 20 April 2015) was an Egyptian footballer. He is considered as a historic player of Tersana. He was described as a "devastating shooter" and "lethal with both feet". He also played for Egypt national football team and is the Africa Cup of Nations all-time top Egyptian scorer, and the all-time top scorer of the Egyptian Premier League. El-Shazly is widely regarded as one of the best forwards in the history of African football.

== Career ==
El-Shazly played for the Egyptian team Tersana. He led Tersana to its only Egyptian League title in the 1963 season. He was the Egyptian Premier League top goalscorer for four times. As of 2010, this is an Egyptian record that still holds. He scored 34 goals as the top league scorer of the 1974–75 Egyptian Premier League season, a one-season record that still stands. This was done at a relative old age; he was 32 years old. El-Shazly is the Egyptian Premier League's all-time goal scorer with 173 goals.

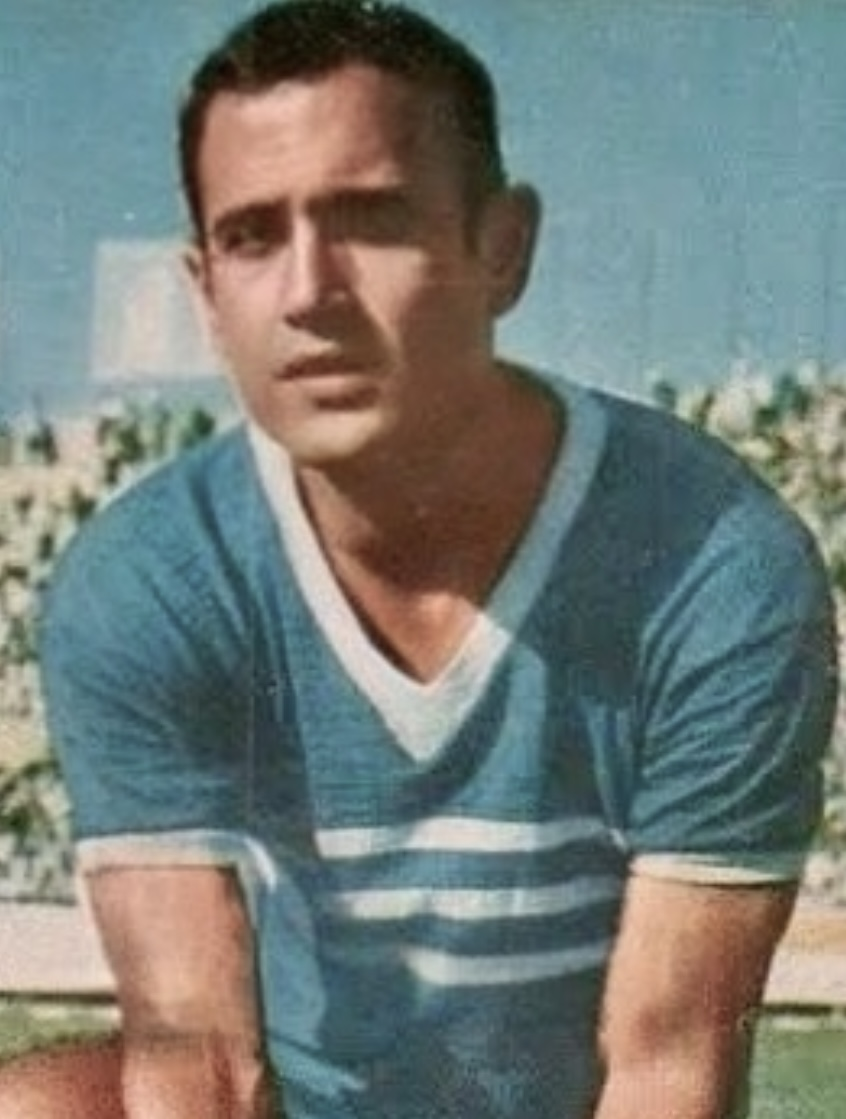
El-Shazly with Tersana in 1967

He also represented the Egypt national football team, and was the top scorer with six goals at the 1963 African Cup of Nations. He played with his country in the 1965 Arab Games, and Egypt won the gold medal, he was the tournament top scorer with 9 goals. El-Shazly also played in the 1970 African Cup of Nations and scored 5 goals and his country finished third in the tournament. He played in the 1974 African Cup of Nations and scored his 12th goal in the Africa Cup of Nations record, becoming Egypt's all time top scorer in the tournament. He played 62 international caps and scored 49 goals for his country.

== Career statistics ==
=== Club ===
Club	Season	League			Cup		Other		Total	
Club	Season	Division	Apps	Goals	Apps	Goals	Apps	Goals	Apps	Goals
Tersana	1959–60	EPL		1			—			
Tersana	1960–61	EPL		1		1	—			2
Tersana	1961–62	EPL		3		1	—			4
Tersana	1962–63	EPL		29		2	—			31
Tersana	1963–64	EPL		24		0	—			24
Tersana	1964–65	EPL		23		10	—			33
Tersana	1965–66	EPL		18		7	—			25
Tersana	1966–67	EPL		9		3	—			12
Tersana	1971–72	EPL		1			—			
Tersana	1972–73	EPL		5			—			
Tersana	1973–74	EPL		6			—			
Tersana	1974–75	EPL		34		3		7 (Note: Goals in October League Cup)		44
Tersana	1975–76	EPL		14		4	—			18
Tersana	1976–77	EPL		5			—			
Tersana	total			173		32		7		212
Career total				173		32		7		212

=== International ===
Appearances and goals by national team and year
National team	Year	Apps	Goals
Egypt	1961	4	5
Egypt	1963	11	9
Egypt	1964	7	4
Egypt	1965	7	9
Egypt	1966	2	1
Egypt	1967	4	0
Egypt	1968	4	3
Egypt	1969	5	4
Egypt	1970	4	5
Egypt	1971	6	4
Egypt	1972	5	4
Egypt	1974	3	1
Egypt	1975	2	0
Total		64	49

Scores and results list Egypt's goal tally first, score column indicates score after each El-Shazly goal.

List of international goals scored by Hassan El-Shazly
No.	Date	Venue	Opponent	Score	Result	Competition	Ref.
1	31 August 1961	Stade Mohammed V, Casablanca, Morocco	Libya	1-0	2-1	1961 Arab Games	
2	3 September 1961	Stade Mohammed V, Casablanca, Morocco	Saudi Arabia	2-0	13-0	1961 Arab Games	
3	3 September 1961	Stade Mohammed V, Casablanca, Morocco	Saudi Arabia	5-0	13-0	1961 Arab Games	
4	3 September 1961	Stade Mohammed V, Casablanca, Morocco	Saudi Arabia	10-0	13-0	1961 Arab Games	
5	5 September 1961	Stade Mohammed V, Casablanca, Morocco	Kuwait	—	8-0	1961 Arab Games	
6	18 September 1963	Salerno, Italy	Spain Amateurs	—	1-1	1963 Mediterranean Games	
7	20 September 1963	Stadio Alberto Pinto, Caserta, Italy	Malta Amateurs	5-0	6-0	1963 Mediterranean Games	
8	20 September 1963	Stadio Alberto Pinto, Caserta, Italy	Malta Amateurs	6-0	6-0	1963 Mediterranean Games	
9	24 November 1963	Kumasi Sports Stadium, Kumasi, Ghana	Nigeria	3-0	6-3	1963 African Cup of Nations	
10	24 November 1963	Kumasi Sports Stadium, Kumasi, Ghana	Nigeria	4-0	6-3	1963 African Cup of Nations	
11	24 November 1963	Kumasi Sports Stadium, Kumasi, Ghana	Nigeria	5-1	6-3	1963 African Cup of Nations	
12	26 November 1963	Kumasi Sports Stadium, Kumasi, Ghana	Sudan	1-0	2-2	1963 African Cup of Nations	
13	30 November 1963	Accra Sports Stadium, Accra, Ghana	Ethiopia	1-0	3-0	1963 African Cup of Nations	
14	30 November 1963	Accra Sports Stadium, Accra, Ghana	Ethiopia	2-0	3-0	1963 African Cup of Nations	
15	15 January 1964	Nasser Stadium, Cairo Egypt	Uganda	—	3-1	1964 Summer Olympics qualification	
16	22 March 1964	Alexandria, Egypt	Algeria	—	2-2	Friendly	
17	27 March 1964	Nasser Stadium, Cairo Egypt	Sudan	4-1	4-1	1964 Summer Olympics qualification	
18	17 April 1964	Khartoum, Sudan	Sudan	2-0	3-3	1964 Summer Olympics qualification	
19	3 September 1965	Cairo, Egypt	(Aden Colony) Aden	—	14-0	1965 Arab Games	
20	3 September 1965	Cairo, Egypt	(Aden Colony) Aden	—	14-0	1965 Arab Games	
21	3 September 1965	Cairo, Egypt	(Aden Colony) Aden	—	14-0	1965 Arab Games	
22	3 September 1965	Cairo, Egypt	(Aden Colony) Aden	—	14-0	1965 Arab Games	
23	3 September 1965	Cairo, Egypt	(Aden Colony) Aden	—	14-0	1965 Arab Games	
24	4 September 1965	Cairo, Egypt	Lebanon	2-0	3-0	1965 Arab Games	
25	9 September 1965	Cairo, Egypt	Libya	—	8-1	1965 Arab Games	
26	9 September 1965	Cairo, Egypt	Libya	—	8-1	1965 Arab Games	
27	9 September 1965	Cairo, Egypt	Libya	—	8-1	1965 Arab Games	
28	25 February 1966	Cairo, Egypt	Bulgaria	—	2-2	Friendly	
29	12 November 1968	Cairo, Egypt	Soviet Union	—	4-1	Friendly	
30	12 November 1968	Cairo, Egypt	Soviet Union	—	4-1	Friendly	
31	12 November 1968	Cairo, Egypt	Soviet Union	—	4-1	Friendly	
32	27 June 1969	Cairo, Egypt	Jordan	—	6-1	Friendly	
33	27 June 1969	Cairo, Egypt	Jordan	—	6-1	Friendly	
34	19 September 1969	Cairo International Stadium, Cairo, Egypt	Algeria	1-0	1-0	1970 African Cup of Nations qualification	
35	28 September 1969	20 August 1955 Stadium, Algiers, Algeria	Algeria	1-1	1-1	1970 African Cup of Nations qualification	
36	6 February 1970	Wad Madani Stadium, Wad Madani, Sudan	Guinea	4-1	4-1	1970 African Cup of Nations	
37	14 February 1970	Municipal Stadium, Khartoum, Sudan	Sudan	1-1	1-2	1970 African Cup of Nations	
38	16 February 1970	Municipal Stadium, Khartoum, Sudan	Ivory Coast	1-0	3-1	1970 African Cup of Nations	
39	16 February 1970	Municipal Stadium, Khartoum, Sudan	Ivory Coast	2-0	3-1	1970 African Cup of Nations	
40	16 February 1970	Municipal Stadium, Khartoum, Sudan	Ivory Coast	3-0	3-1	1970 African Cup of Nations	
41	21 March 1971	Cairo International Stadium, Cairo, Egypt	Morocco	—	3-2	1972 African Cup of Nations qualification	
42	21 March 1971	Cairo International Stadium, Cairo, Egypt	Morocco	—	3-2	1972 African Cup of Nations qualification	
43	11 July 1971	Tripoli, Libya	Syria	1-0	1-0	1971 Al-Jalaa Tournament	
44	16 July 1971	Tripoli, Libya	Libya	—	2-3	1971 Al-Jalaa Tournament	
45	12 January 1972	Al-Shaab Stadium, Baghdad, Iraq	Syria	—	4-2	1972 Palestine Cup of Nations	
46	12 January 1972	Al-Shaab Stadium, Baghdad, Iraq	Syria	—	4-2	1972 Palestine Cup of Nations	
47	14 January 1972	Al-Shaab Stadium, Baghdad, Iraq	Iraq	1-0	3-1	1972 Palestine Cup of Nations	
48	24 November 1972	Cairo, Egypt	Somalia	—	4-1	1973 All-Africa Games qualification	
49	6 March 1974	Cairo International Stadium, Cairo, Egypt	Ivory Coast	1-0	2-0	1974 African Cup of Nations	

== Honours ==
=== Player ===
Tersana

- Egyptian Premier League: 1962–63
- Egypt Cup: 1964–65, 1966–67

United Arab Republic

- African Cup of Nations: 3rd place, 1963, 1970
- Arab Games gold medal: 1965
- Palestine Cup of Nations: 1972

Egypt

- African Cup of Nations: 3rd place, 1974

=== Individual ===
- Egyptian Premier League top scorer: 1962–63, 1964–65, 1965–66, 1974–75
- Africa Cup of Nations Top scorer: 1963
- Africa Cup of Nations All-time Top Egyptian scorer: 12 goals
- Egyptian Premier League all-time goalscorer: 173 goals
