= Nidal al-Sabeh =

- نضال السبع
- Born: 1971 (age 54–55); Tripoli, Lebanon
- Occupation: Journalist
- Known for: Mediation in the Syrian conflict
- Father: Said al-Sabeh

Nidal al-Sabeh (born 1971) is a Palestinian journalist and political analyst based in Lebanon. He acted as a mediator in the Syrian peace process, having been tasked by Palestinian President Mahmoud Abbas with delivering messages and preparing for the Geneva II Conference (2014). In 2013, he participated in a mediation that averted a military strike against the Syrian government following the use of chemical weapons. He is the son of the leader in the Palestine Liberation Organization, Said al-Sabeh, head of the organization's missions in Algeria and Tunisia, and the representative of Palestine at the Arab Summit after the 1967 war.

He studied at the Evangelical School in Tripoli and then at the Dawood Karam School, where he completed his secondary education. He took part in the twentieth edition of the Arab National Congress, held in Khartoum, Sudan, between 16 and 19 April 2009, under the theme "Resistance as a Strategic Option for the Nation."

On 13 October 2026, al-Sabeh demanded that the Hamas leadership publicly clarify the reality of 7 October instead of continuing to shield Yahya Sinwar, characterising the events in Gaza as a "crime".
