= Amin Zaki =

Sudanese footballer (1941–2019)

Personal information
- Full name: Amin Muhamed Zaki
- Date of birth: 1941
- Place of birth: Tuti Island, Anglo-Egyptian Sudan
- Date of death: 6 July 2019 (aged 78)
- Place of death: Cairo, Egypt
- Position: Defender

Senior career*
Years	Team	Apps	(Gls)
1956	Tuti SC		
1957–1971	Al Hilal Omdurman		
1971–1972	Al Ahly		
1972–1974	Al Hilal Omdurman		

International career
1959–1970	Sudan	14+	(2+)

Managerial career
- 1980: Sudan
Medal record
Men's football
Representing Sudan
Africa Cup of Nations
Winner	1970 Sudan
Runner-up	1963 Ghana
Arab Games
Silver medal – second place	1965 Cairo
- * Club domestic league appearances and goals

Amin Muhamed Zaki (Arabic: أمين محمد زكي; 1941 – 6 July 2019) was a Sudanese footballer who played as a defender. Nicknamed the "Star of Stars", he was the Sudan national team's captain when they won their only African Cup of Nations title in 1970. He also represented Sudan at the 1963 African Cup of Nations and the 1965 Arab Games.

Following his retirement, he worked as the director of Al Hilal Omdurman, before later managing the Sudan national team for one match in 1980. Between 1993 and 2019, he also worked as a lecturer for the Confederation of African Football.

Zaki died in Cairo on 6 July 2019 at the age of 78.

== Honours ==
Sudan

- African Cup of Nations: 1970; runner-up: 1963
- Arab Games silver medalist: 1965
