= Hamza Abdel Mawla =

Egyptian footballer (1923–1987)

Personal information
- Full name: Hamza Abdel Mawla
- Date of birth: 26 October 1923
- Place of birth: Giza, Kingdom of Egypt
- Date of death: 26 July 1987 (aged 63)
- Place of death: Giza, Egypt
- Position: Defender

International career
Years	Team	Apps	(Gls)
- Egypt

Hamza Abdel Mawla (26 October 1923 – 26 July 1987) was an Egyptian footballer. He competed in the men's tournament at the 1952 Summer Olympics.

He competed with Tersana SC for over a decade, and worked with both the Egyptian and Saudi national football teams after his retirement.
