= 1972 AFC Asian Cup qualification =

Tournament details
- Dates: 21 May – 24 December 1971
- Teams: 13 (from 1 confederation)

Tournament statistics
- Matches played: 29
- Goals scored: 98 (3.38 per match)

The qualification for the 1972 AFC Asian Cup consisted of 13 teams in three zones. The winner and runners-up of each group would join hosts Thailand and title defenders Iran in the final tournament.

== Zones ==
Central zone	Eastern zone	Western zone 1	Western zone 2
Brunei; ~~Burma~~*; Hong Kong; Indonesia; Khmer Republic; ~~Laos~~*; Malaysia; ~~Singapore~~*; Thailand; ~~South Vietnam~~*	~~Japan~~*; ~~Philippines~~*; ~~Taiwan~~ * South Korea	~~Afghanistan~~*; ~~Israel~~**; ~~Nepal~~*	Bahrain; Ceylon; ~~India~~*; Iraq***; Jordan; Kuwait; ~~Pakistan~~*; Lebanon; Syria

- * Withdrew
- ** Israel originally qualified as hosts, but withdrew later
- *** Iraq were allocated to Western zone later
- Iran qualified as defending champions

== Central Zone ==
All matches played in Thailand.

Group allocation matches where winners were divided into separate groups.

21 May 1971

Thailand	1–1	Khmer Republic
Penalties
	5–1

National Stadium, Bangkok

22 May 1971

Malaysia	8–0	Brunei
Norbit 12', 28', 80'; S. Abdullah 28', 38', 83'; Wong Choon Wah 37'; Soh Chin Aun 48'

National Stadium, Bangkok

22 May 1971

Indonesia	2–1	Hong Kong
Santoso 4' ? (?)		? (?)

National Stadium, Bangkok

=== Group A ===
Pos	Team	Pld	W	D	L	GF	GA	GD	Pts	Qualification
1	Indonesia	2	2	0	0	10	0	+10	4	Advance to semi-finals
2	Thailand	2	1	0	1	10	1	+9	2	Advance to semi-finals
3	Brunei	2	0	0	2	0	19	−19	0	

24 May 1971

Thailand	10–0	Brunei

National Stadium, Bangkok

26 May 1971

Indonesia	1–0	Thailand

National Stadium, Bangkok

28 May 1971

Indonesia	9–0	Brunei

National Stadium, Bangkok

=== Group B ===
Pos	Team	Pld	W	D	L	GF	GA	GD	Pts	Qualification
1	Malaysia	2	2	0	0	4	2	+2	4	Advance to semi-finals
2	Khmer Republic	2	1	0	1	3	3	0	2	Advance to semi-finals
3	Hong Kong	2	0	0	2	2	4	−2	0	

24 May 1971

Khmer Republic	2–1	Hong Kong

National Stadium, Bangkok

26 May 1971

Malaysia	2–1	Khmer Republic
Wong Choon Wah 12'; S. Abdullah 75'		Selim 44'

National Stadium, Bangkok

28 May 1971

Malaysia	2–1	Hong Kong
S. Abdullah 25', 69'		Chung Chor Wai 44'

National Stadium, Bangkok
Attendance: 30,000

=== Semi-finals ===
30 May 1971

Khmer Republic	2–0	Indonesia
Sea Cheng Eang (?)

National Stadium, Bangkok
Attendance: 20,000

30 May 1971

Thailand	1–0	Malaysia

National Stadium, Bangkok

=== Third place play-off ===
1 June 1971

Malaysia	3–0	Indonesia
R. Abdullah 33'; Bakar 84'; Mydin 88'

National Stadium, Bangkok
Referee: Nisan Thantanond (Thailand)

=== Final ===
1 June 1971

Thailand	4–2	Khmer Republic

National Stadium, Bangkok

== Eastern Zone ==
All the other teams withdrew, so South Korea qualified automatically.

== Western Zone ==
All matches played in Kuwait.

Group allocation matches where winners were divided into separate groups. Ceylon received a bye and was automatically allocated into Group A.

10 December 1971

Iraq	1–1	Kuwait
Aziz 15'		Mohamed (?)
Penalties
	2–4

Kuwait

11 December 1971

Bahrain	3–0	Lebanon

Kuwait

11 December 1971

Syria	0–0	Jordan
Penalties
	4–3

Kuwait

=== Group A ===
Pos	Team	Pld	W	D	L	GF	GA	GD	Pts	Qualification
1	Iraq	3	3	0	0	8	0	+8	6	Advance to semi-finals
2	Jordan	3	2	0	1	5	5	0	4	Advance to semi-finals
3	Bahrain	3	1	0	2	5	4	+1	2	
4	Ceylon	3	0	0	3	1	10	−9	0	

13 December 1971

Iraq	5–0	Ceylon
Kadhim 32', 42', 69'; Kamil 51'; Khalaf 88'

Kuwait
Referee: Sarkis Demirdjian (Lebanon)

13 December 1971

Jordan	3–2	Bahrain

Kuwait

15 December 1971

Iraq	1–0	Bahrain
Kadhim 89'

Kuwait

16 December 1971

Jordan	2–1	Ceylon

Kuwait

18 December 1971

Iraq	2–0	Jordan
Ahmed 11'; Kadhim 62'

Kuwait

20 December 1971

Bahrain	3–0	Ceylon

Kuwait

=== Group B ===
Pos	Team	Pld	W	D	L	GF	GA	GD	Pts	Qualification
1	Kuwait	2	1	1	0	3	2	+1	3	Advance to semi-finals
2	Lebanon	2	1	0	1	3	3	0	2	Advance to semi-finals
3	Syria	2	0	1	1	4	5	−1	1	

14 December 1971

Kuwait	1–0	Lebanon
Khalaf (?)		Rahal (red card)

Kuwait

17 December 1971

Kuwait	2–2	Syria
Khalaf (?); Ibrahim (?)		? (?)

Kuwait

19 December 1971

Lebanon	3–2	Syria
Mantoufi 23'; Al Ghoul 35', 55'		Said 3'; Nano 25'

Kuwait
Referee: Fernando (Ceylon)

=== Semi-finals ===
21 December 1971

Kuwait	2–0	Jordan
Al Khashram (?); Khalaf (?)

Kuwait

22 December 1971

Iraq	4–1	Lebanon
Kadhim 40', 53'; Aziz 65'; Ahmed 83'		Mantoufi 88'

Shuwaikh High School Stadium, Kuwait City

=== Third place play-off ===
24 December 1971

Lebanon	2–0	Jordan
Al Ghoul (?); Mantoufi (?)	Report

Kuwait

=== Final ===
24 December 1971

Iraq	1–0	Kuwait
Nouri 90+4'

Kuwait
Referee: Sarkis Demirdjian (Lebanon)

== Qualified teams ==
Team	Qualified as	Qualified on	Previous appearance
Thailand	Hosts* and Central Zone winners	30 May 1971	0 (debut)
Iran	1968 AFC Asian Cup Champions	19 May 1968	1 (1968)
Khmer Republic	Central Zone runners-up	30 May 1971	0 (debut)
South Korea	Eastern zone winners (automatically qualified)	1971	3 (1956, 1960, 1964)
Iraq	Western Zone winners	22 December 1971	0 (debut)
Kuwait	Western Zone runners-up	21 December 1971	0 (debut)

- Israel originally qualified as hosts but later withdrew. Thailand replaced them later.

== Goalscorers ==
There were 98 goals scored in 29 matches, for an average of 3.38 goals per match.

7 goals

- (Iraq) Ali Kadhim

6 goals

- (Malaysia) Shaharuddin Abdullah

3 goals

- (Kuwait) Jawad Khalaf
- (Lebanon) Daoud Mantoufi
- (Lebanon) Youssef Al Ghoul
- (Malaysia) Shah Norbit

2 goals

- (Iraq) Douglas Aziz
- (Iraq) Razzaq Ahmed
- (Cambodia) Sea Cheng Eang
- (Malaysia) Wong Choon Wah

1 goal

- (Hong Kong) Chung Chor Wai
- (Indonesia) Budi Santoso
- (Iraq) Shamil Kamil
- (Iraq) Sattar Khalaf
- (Iraq) Riyadh Nouri
- (Cambodia) Slayman Selim
- (Kuwait) Farouq Ibrahim
- (Kuwait) Hamad Khaled Mohamed
- (Kuwait) Ibrahim Al Khashram
- (Malaysia) Ibrahim Mydin
- (Malaysia) Isa Bakar
- (Malaysia) Rahim Abdullah
- (Malaysia) Soh Chin Aun
- (Syria) Nabil Nano
- (Syria) Samir Said
