= Football at the 1965 Arab Games =

1965 Arab Games football tournament
Tournament details
- Host country: United Arab Republic
- City: Cairo
- Dates: 2–11 September 1965
- Teams: 10 (from 2 confederations)
- Venue: 2 (in 1 host city)

Final positions
- Champions: United Arab Republic (2nd title)
- Runners-up: Sudan
- Third place: Libya
- Fourth place: Palestine

Tournament statistics
- Matches played: 24
- Goals scored: 151 (6.29 per match)
- Top scorer(s): (Libya) Ali Al-Biski (13 goals)

The 1965 Arab Games football tournament was the 4th edition of the Arab Games men's football tournament. The football tournament was held in Cairo, Egypt between 2–11 September 1965 as part of the 1965 Arab Games.

== Participating teams ==
The following countries have participated for the final tournament:

- Iraq
- Lahej
- Lebanon
- Libya
- Muscat and Oman
- Palestine
- Aden
- Sudan
- Syria
- United Arab Republic (hosts)

== Group stage ==
=== Group A ===
| Team | Pld | W | D | L | GF | GA | GD | Pts |
|---|---|---|---|---|---|---|---|---|
| United Arab Republic | 4 | 4 | 0 | 0 | 20 | 1 | +19 | 8 |
| Palestine | 4 | 2 | 1 | 1 | 4 | 3 | +1 | 5 |
| Iraq | 4 | 1 | 2 | 1 | 7 | 2 | +5 | 4 |
| Lebanon | 4 | 1 | 1 | 2 | 4 | 7 | –3 | 3 |
| Aden | 4 | 0 | 0 | 4 | 3 | 25 | -22 | 0 |

2 September 1965

| United Arab Republic | Abandoned^{1} | Iraq |

Zamalek Stadium, Cairo
Referee: Mamdouh Karma (Jordan)
2 September 1965

| Palestine | 1–0 | Aden |
|---|---|---|
| El-Sheikh 20' |

Cairo

3 September 1965

| United Arab Republic | 14–0 | Aden |
|---|---|---|
| El-Shazly; Reyadh; Abdel Fattah; Rifaat; Shehta |

Cairo
3 September 1965

| Palestine | 1–0 | Lebanon |
|---|---|---|
| Mughrabi 22' |

Cairo

4 September 1965

| Iraq | 6–0 | Aden |
|---|---|---|
| Ammo Baba; Atta; Hameed |

Cairo
4 September 1965

| United Arab Republic | 3–0 | Lebanon |
|---|---|---|
| Morsi; El-Shazly; Gabr |

Cairo

6 September 1965

| United Arab Republic | 2–1 | Palestine |
|---|---|---|
| Abdel Fattah 19'; Morsi 35' | | Gallia 62' (pen.) |

Cairo
6 September 1965

| Iraq | 0–0 | Lebanon |

Cairo

7 September 1965

| Palestine | 1–1 | Iraq |
|---|---|---|
| El-Sheikh 37' | | Dawood 54' |

Cairo
7 September 1965

| Lebanon | 4–3 | Aden |

Cairo

8 September 1965

| United Arab Republic | 1–0 Replay^{1} | Iraq |
|---|---|---|
| El-Gohary 5' |

Cairo

^1The match was abandoned at kick off because security fears due to overcrowding at the stadium caused the referee to call the match off. The match was replayed on 8 September 1965

=== Group B ===
| Team | Pld | W | D | L | GF | GA | GD | Pts |
|---|---|---|---|---|---|---|---|---|
| Sudan | 4 | 4 | 0 | 0 | 30 | 2 | +28 | 8 |
| Libya | 4 | 3 | 0 | 1 | 39 | 8 | +31 | 6 |
| Syria | 4 | 2 | 0 | 2 | 20 | 8 | +12 | 4 |
| (Sultanate of Lahej) Lahej | 4 | 1 | 0 | 3 | 2 | 30 | –28 | 2 |
| Muscat and Oman | 4 | 0 | 0 | 4 | 2 | 45 | –43 | 0 |

2 September 1965

| Sudan | 9–0 | (Sultanate of Lahej) Lahej |
|---|---|---|
| Jaksa (?); Sedig (?); Al-Deim (?); Alfan (?); Al-Kawarti (?) |

Cairo
2 September 1965

| Libya | 15–1 | Muscat and Oman |
|---|---|---|
| Al-Biski | | Goal |

Cairo

3 September 1965

| Syria | 4–0 | (Sultanate of Lahej) Lahej |

Cairo
3 September 1965

| Sudan | 4–2 | Libya |
|---|---|---|
| Sedig (?); Samir (?); Marhoum (?); Jaxa (?) |

Cairo

4 September 1965

| Libya | 6–3 | Syria |

Cairo
4 September 1965

| Sudan | 15–0 | Muscat and Oman |
|---|---|---|
| Shawish (?); Marhoum (?); Hasabu El Sagheir (?); Samir (?); Al-Kawarti (?); Amin Zaki (?) |

Cairo

6 September 1965

| Libya | 16–0 | (Sultanate of Lahej) Lahej |
|---|---|---|
| Al-Biski |

Cairo
6 September 1965

| Syria | 13–0 | Muscat and Oman |

Cairo

7 September 1965

| Lahej (Sultanate of Lahej) | 2–1 | Muscat and Oman |

Cairo
7 September 1965

| Sudan | 2–0 | Syria |
|---|---|---|
| Sedig (?); Al-Kawarti (?) |

Cairo

== Knockout stage ==
Semifinals
9 September – Cairo
United Arab Republic | 8
Libya | 1
9 September – Cairo
Sudan | 2
Palestine | 1

Final
11 September – Cairo
United Arab Republic | 2
Sudan | 0
Third place
10 September – Cairo
Libya | 4
Palestine | 2

=== Semifinals ===
9 September 1965
16:00

| United Arab Republic | 8–1 | Libya |
|---|---|---|
| Reyadh 4', 12', 19'; El-Shazly 33', 52', 85'; Shehta 40', 79' | | Al-Biski |

Cairo

9 September 1965
16:00

| Sudan | 2–1 | Palestine |
|---|---|---|
| Amin Zaki (?) |

Cairo

=== Third place match ===
10 September 1965
16:00

| Libya | 4–2 | Palestine |
|---|---|---|
| Al-Biski |

Cairo

=== Final ===
11 September 1965
15:00

| United Arab Republic | 0–0 | Sudan |
|---|---|---|
| | (Egypt won title on toss) |

Cairo

== Final ranking ==
| Rank | Team | Pld | W | D | L | GF | GA | GD | Pts |
|---|---|---|---|---|---|---|---|---|---|
| 1 | United Arab Republic | 6 | 5 | 1 | 0 | 28 | 2 | +26 | 11 |
| 2 | Sudan | 6 | 5 | 1 | 0 | 32 | 3 | +29 | 11 |
| 3 | Libya | 6 | 4 | 0 | 2 | 44 | 18 | +26 | 8 |
| 4 | Palestine | 6 | 2 | 1 | 3 | 7 | 9 | −2 | 5 |
Eliminated in the group stage
| 5 | Syria | 4 | 2 | 0 | 2 | 20 | 8 | +12 | 4 |
| 6 | Iraq | 4 | 1 | 2 | 1 | 7 | 2 | +5 | 4 |
| 7 | Lebanon | 4 | 1 | 1 | 2 | 4 | 7 | −3 | 3 |
| 8 | (Sultanate of Lahej) Lahej | 4 | 1 | 0 | 3 | 2 | 30 | −28 | 2 |
| 9 | Aden | 4 | 0 | 0 | 4 | 3 | 25 | −22 | 0 |
| 10 | Muscat and Oman | 4 | 0 | 0 | 4 | 2 | 45 | −43 | 0 |
| Total | | 48 | 22 | 4 | 22 | 151 | 151 | 0 | 48 |
