= 1962 Egypt Cup final =

- Event: 1961–62 Egypt Cup
Zamalek	Al Ittihad Alexandria
5	1
- Date: 19 May 1962

1962 Egypt Cup final, was the final match of the 1961–62 Egypt Cup, was between Zamalek and Al Ittihad Alexandria, Zamalek won the match 5–1.

== Route to the final ==
Zamalek		Round	Al Ittihad Alexandria
Opponent	Result	1961–62 Egypt Cup	Opponent	Result
Mahala	3–1	First Round		?
Masry	4–2	Quarterfinals		?
Tersana	2–0	Semifinals		?

== Match details ==
19 May 1962

Zamalek	5 – 1	Al Ittihad Alexandria
Rifaat 20', 72'; Effat 75', 87'; Noshi 82' (pen.)	Report	Youssef 90'

Zamalek:
GK	(Italy) Aldo Stella
RB	(United Arab Republic) Ahmed Mostafa
CB	(United Arab Republic) Mahmoud Hassanain
CB	(United Arab Republic) Mahmoud Abou-Regaila
LB	(United Arab Republic) Abdou Noshi
CM	(United Arab Republic) Samir Qotb
CM	(United Arab Republic) Khedr
RW	(United Arab Republic) Ahmed Rifaat
AM	(United Arab Republic) Nabil Nosair
LW	(United Arab Republic) Hamada Emam
CF	(United Arab Republic) Ahmed Effat
Substitutions:
Manager:

Al Ittihad Alexandria:
GK	(United Arab Republic) Salah Aboul Magd
RB	(United Arab Republic) Gaber Khalil
CB	(United Arab Republic) Ahmed Saleh
CB	(United Arab Republic) Khamis Hammouda
LB	(United Arab Republic) Abdel Latif Lotfi
CM	(United Arab Republic) Ahmed Abaza
CM	(United Arab Republic) Farouk Ahmed
RW	(United Arab Republic) Gaber El-Khawaga
AM	(United Arab Republic) Foad Morsi
LW	(United Arab Republic) Mohamed Ashour
CF	(United Arab Republic) Ragab Hashem	(substituted off) ?'
Substitutions:
FW	(United Arab Republic) Mohamed Youssef	(substituted in) ?'
Manager:
