= Razzaq Ahmed =

Iraqi association football player

Personal information
- Full name: Abdul-Razzaq Ahmed Bashir
- Date of birth: 1 July 1944 (age 82)
- Place of birth: Iraq
- Position: Forward

International career
Years	Team	Apps	(Gls)
1970–1974	Iraq		

Razzaq Ahmed (born 1 July 1944) is a former Iraqi football forward who played for Iraq in the 1972 AFC Asian Cup qualification.

Kamil played for the national team between 1970 and 1974.

== Career statistics ==
=== International goals ===
Scores and results list Iraq's goal tally first.

No	Date	Venue	Opponent	Score	Result	Competition
1.	18 December 1971	National Stadium, Kuwait City	Jordan	1–0	2–0	1972 AFC Asian Cup qualification
2.	22 December 1971	National Stadium, Kuwait City	Lebanon	4–1	4–1	1972 AFC Asian Cup qualification
