= Ahmed Amar =

Algerian footballer (1951–2026)

Personal information
- Date of birth: 22 June 1951
- Place of birth: Sidi Bel Abbès, French Algeria
- Date of death: 5 July 2026 (aged 75)
- Place of death: Tlemcen, Algeria
- Position: Midfielder

Youth career
- USM Bel Abbès

Senior career*
Years	Team	Apps	(Gls)
1967–1985	USM Bel Abbès		

International career
1971–1972	Algeria	7	(1)
- * Club domestic league appearances and goals

Ahmed Amar (Arabic: أحمد عمار; 22 June 1951 – 5 July 2026) was an Algerian footballer who played as a midfielder. He made seven appearances for the Algeria national team, scoring once. He died on 5 July 2026, at the age of 75.

== Honours ==
USM Bel Abbès

- Algerian Championship third place: 1969, 1983

Algeria

- Palestine Cup of Nations third place: 1972
