= 1974–75 Egyptian Premier League =

Egyptian Premier League
- Season: 1974–75
- Dates: 6 September 1974 – 6 April 1975
- Champions: Al Ahly (12th title)
- Relegated: No relegation
- Matches played: 306
- Goals scored: 628 (2.05 per match)
- Top goalscorer: Hassan El-Shazly (34 goals)

The 1974–75 Egyptian Premier League, was the 19th season of the Egyptian Premier League, the top Egyptian professional league for association football clubs, since its establishment in 1948. The season started on 6 September 1974 and concluded on 6 April 1975. Al Ahly won the league for the 12th time in the club's history.

== League table ==
| Pos | Club | Pld | W | D | L | F | A | Pts |
|---|---|---|---|---|---|---|---|---|
| 1 | Al Ahly (C) | 34 | 26 | 7 | 1 | 70 | 11 | 59 |
| 2 | Tersana | 34 | 22 | 8 | 4 | 63 | 19 | 52 |
| 3 | Ismaily | 34 | 19 | 13 | 2 | 66 | 21 | 51 |
| 4 | Ghazl El Mahalla | 34 | 19 | 8 | 7 | 51 | 22 | 46 |
| 5 | Zamalek | 34 | 18 | 8 | 8 | 56 | 20 | 44 |
| 6 | Al Masry | 34 | 16 | 8 | 10 | 39 | 30 | 40 |
| 7 | Al Ittihad | 34 | 12 | 12 | 10 | 27 | 28 | 36 |
| 8 | Olympic Club | 34 | 11 | 12 | 11 | 32 | 32 | 34 |
| 9 | Aviation | 34 | 9 | 13 | 12 | 28 | 42 | 31 |
| 10 | El Mansoura | 34 | 10 | 10 | 14 | 25 | 32 | 30 |
| 11 | El Sekka El Hadid | 34 | 10 | 9 | 15 | 28 | 36 | 29 |
| 12 | El Plastic | 34 | 7 | 14 | 13 | 26 | 39 | 28 |
| 13 | Suez | 34 | 10 | 8 | 16 | 21 | 34 | 28 |
| 14 | Damietta | 34 | 7 | 14 | 13 | 23 | 39 | 28 |
| 15 | El Sharkia | 34 | 8 | 11 | 15 | 31 | 51 | 27 |
| 16 | El Qanah | 34 | 5 | 11 | 18 | 12 | 44 | 21 |
| 17 | Beni Suef | 34 | 2 | 12 | 20 | 16 | 55 | 16 |
| 18 | El Minya | 34 | 2 | 8 | 24 | 14 | 73 | 12 |

(C)= Champion, (R)= Relegated, Pld = Matches played; W = Matches won; D = Matches drawn; L = Matches lost; F = Goals for; A = Goals against; ± = Goal difference; Pts = Points.

== Top goalscorers ==
| Rank | Player | Club | Goals |
|---|---|---|---|
| 1 | (Egypt) Hassan El-Shazly | Tersana | 34 |
| 2 | (Egypt) Mahmoud El Khatib | Al Ahly | 23 |
| 3 | (Egypt) Ali Khalil | Zamalek | 21 |
| 4 | (Egypt) Mussad Nur | Al Masry | 20 |
| 5 | (Egypt) Sayed Abdel Razek | Ismaily | 20 |

== Teams location ==
| Team | Home city |
|---|---|
| Al Ahly | Cairo |
| Aviation | Cairo |
| Al Masry | Port Said |
| Al Ittihad | Alexandria |
| Beni Suef | Beni Suef |
| Damietta SC | Damietta |
| El Qanah | Ismailia |
| El Plastic | Cairo |
| El Sharkia | Zagazig |
| El Minya | Minya |
| El Sekka El Hadid | Cairo |
| El Mansoura | Mansoura |
| Ghazl El Mahalla | El Mahalla |
| Ismaily | Ismailia |
| Olympic | Alexandria |
| Suez | Suez |
| Tersana | Giza |
| Zamalek | Giza |
