= PDR Yemen Football Federation =

Former governing body for association football

AFC
- Founded: 1940
- Folded: 1990
- FIFA affiliation: 1967–1990
- AFC affiliation: 1972–1990

The PDR Yemen Football Federation was the governing body of football in the People's Democratic Republic of Yemen, commonly known as South Yemen, and was responsible for organising the South Yemen national football team. The organisation was founded in 1940, but only became a FIFA member in 1967. In 1972, they also joined the Asian Football Confederation. The association folded in 1990 following Yemeni unification. The Yemen Football Association, considered the successor to North Yemen, subsequently took control of football in the region.
