= Kamel Tahir =

Algerian footballer (1945–2023)

Personal information
- Date of birth: 11 January 1945
- Place of birth: Saint-Eugène, French Algeria
- Date of death: 11 January 2023 (aged 78)
- Position: Goalkeeper

Senior career*
Years	Team	Apps	(Gls)
1962–1964	OM Saint-Eugène		
1964–1969	USM Alger		
1969–1971	CS Douanes Alger		
1971–1977	JS Kabylie		

International career
1966–1974	Algeria	11	(0)
- * Club domestic league appearances and goals

Kamel Tahir (Arabic: كمال طاهر; 11 January 1945 – 11 January 2023) was an Algerian footballer who played as a goalkeeper.

He played for OM Saint-Eugène, USM Alger, CS Douanes Alger, and JS Kabylie. Additionally, he played in 11 matches for the Algeria national team, starting on 24 November 1971 in a 0–0 draw with Libya and ending on 11 May 1974 in a 2–1 loss to Tunisia.
