= Shamil Kamil =

Iraqi association football player

Personal information
- Full name: Shamil Kamil
- Date of birth: 1 July 1947 (age 79)
- Place of birth: Iraq
- Position: Forward

Senior career*
Years	Team	Apps	(Gls)
- Al-Talaba SC

International career
1971–1973	Iraq		(3)
- * Club domestic league appearances and goals

Shamil Kamil (born 1 July 1947) is a former Iraqi football forward who played for Iraq in the 1972 AFC Asian Cup.

Kamil played for the national team between 1971 and 1973.

== Career statistics ==
=== International goals ===
Scores and results list Iraq's goal tally first.

No	Date	Venue	Opponent	Score	Result	Competition
1.	13 December 1971	National Stadium, Kuwait City	Ceylon	3–0	5–0	1972 AFC Asian Cup qualification
2.	12 January 1972	Al-Shaab Stadium, Baghdad	Algeria	1–0	3–1	1972 Palestine Cup
3.	12 January 1972	Al-Shaab Stadium, Baghdad	Algeria	3–1	3–1	1972 Palestine Cup
