= Abubakar Al-Mass =

Yemeni footballer

Abubakar Al Mass
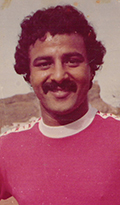

Personal information
- Full name: Abubakar Ibrahim Al-Mass
- Date of birth: 26 February 1958 (age 68)
- Place of birth: Aden, South Yemen (now Yemen)
- Height: 1.71 m (5 ft 7 1/2 in)
- Position: Striker

Senior career*
Years	Team	Apps	(Gls)
1977–1994	Al-Tilal		

International career
1975–1989	South Yemen	12	(2)
1990	Yemen	3	(0)
- * Club domestic league appearances and goals

Abubakar Ibrahim Al-Mas (Arabic: أبوبكر الماس) (born 26 February 1958) is a retired Yemeni football striker who played for Al-Tilal. He was the best player in the era of Yemen golden ball during the 1970s and until the beginning of the 1990s.

== International goals ==
Goals for South Yemen
#	Date	Venue	Opponent	Score	Result	Competition
1	21 December 1975	Tunis	Saudi Arabia	1–0	1–0	1975 Palestine Cup of Nations
2	2 March 1985	May 22	Bahrain	1–4	1–4	1986 FIFA World Cup qualifier
