= 1962–63 Egyptian Premier League =

Egyptian Premier League
- Season: 1962–63
- Dates: 28 September 1962 – 5 June 1963
- Champions: Tersana (1st title)
- Relegated: El Minya
- Matches: 280
- Goals: 806 (2.88 per match)
- Top goalscorer: Hassan El-Shazly (29 goals)

The 1962–63 Egyptian Premier League, was the 13th season of the Egyptian Premier League, the top Egyptian professional league for association football clubs. The league consisted of 2 groups made up of 12 clubs. The season started on 28 September 1962 and ended on 5 June 1963. Tersana won the league for the first time in the club's history.

== League table ==
=== Group 1 ===
| Pos | Team | Pld | W | D | L | GF | GA | GD | Pts | Qualification or relegation |
|---|---|---|---|---|---|---|---|---|---|---|
| 1 | Al Ahly (Q) | 22 | 19 | 2 | 1 | 55 | 11 | +44 | 59 | Qualification to Championship play-off |
| 2 | El Qanah (Q) | 22 | 12 | 2 | 8 | 44 | 19 | +25 | 38 | Qualification to 2nd place Playoff Tournament |
| 3 | Olympic | 22 | 8 | 10 | 4 | 35 | 24 | +11 | 34 | Qualification to 2nd place Playoff Tournament |
| 4 | Suez | 22 | 9 | 8 | 5 | 30 | 23 | +7 | 35 | Qualification to 2nd place Playoff Tournament |
| 5 | Tanta | 22 | 9 | 8 | 5 | 28 | 22 | +6 | 35 | Qualification to 2nd place Playoff Tournament |
| 6 | El Sekka El Hadid | 22 | 9 | 4 | 9 | 29 | 22 | +7 | 31 | |
| 7 | Damietta | 22 | 7 | 8 | 7 | 26 | 28 | −2 | 29 | |
| 8 | El Baharia | 22 | 7 | 7 | 8 | 27 | 31 | −4 | 28 | |
| 9 | Port Fouad | 22 | 8 | 3 | 11 | 26 | 40 | −14 | 27 | |
| 10 | Maleyat Kafr El Zayat | 22 | 7 | 4 | 11 | 27 | 30 | −3 | 25 | |
| 11 | Suez Petroleum | 22 | 2 | 6 | 14 | 16 | 54 | −38 | 12 | |
| 12 | El Minya (R) | 22 | 2 | 4 | 16 | 12 | 51 | −39 | 10 | Qualification to Relegation play-off |

Rules for classification: 1) Points; 2) Goal difference; 3) Goals scored.
(Q) Qualified to Championship play-off; (R) Relegated

=== Group 2 ===
| Pos | Team | Pld | W | D | L | GF | GA | GD | Pts | Qualification or relegation |
|---|---|---|---|---|---|---|---|---|---|---|
| 1 | Zamalek (Q) | 22 | 16 | 2 | 4 | 56 | 23 | +33 | 50 | Qualification to 2nd place Playoff Tournament |
| 2 | Tersana (Q) | 22 | 16 | 2 | 4 | 58 | 36 | +22 | 50 | Qualification to 2nd place Playoff Tournament |
| 3 | Ismaily | 22 | 15 | 4 | 3 | 46 | 15 | +31 | 49 | Qualification to 2nd place Playoff Tournament |
| 4 | Al Ittihad | 22 | 15 | 3 | 4 | 51 | 33 | +18 | 48 | |
| 5 | Al Masry | 22 | 12 | 2 | 8 | 44 | 25 | +19 | 38 | |
| 6 | Ghazl El Mahalla | 22 | 8 | 8 | 6 | 32 | 25 | +7 | 32 | |
| 7 | Suez | 22 | 8 | 1 | 13 | 29 | 39 | −10 | 25 | |
| 8 | Damanhour | 22 | 6 | 3 | 13 | 25 | 49 | −24 | 21 | |
| 9 | Beni Suef | 22 | 5 | 2 | 15 | 21 | 37 | −16 | 17 | |
| 10 | Aviation | 22 | 3 | 6 | 13 | 17 | 41 | −24 | 15 | |
| 11 | El Teram | 22 | 4 | 4 | 14 | 22 | 61 | −39 | 16 | |
| 12 | El Mansoura | 22 | 2 | 7 | 13 | 12 | 29 | −17 | 13 | Qualification to Relegation play-off |

Rules for classification: 1) Points; 2) Goal difference; 3) Goals scored.
(Q) Qualified to Championship play-off

== Final stage ==
=== Championship play-off ===
| Pos | Team | Pld | W | D | L | GF | GA | GD | Pts |
|---|---|---|---|---|---|---|---|---|---|
| 1 | Tersana (C) | 3 | 2 | 1 | 0 | 7 | 4 | +3 | 7 |
| 2 | Zamalek | 3 | 1 | 2 | 0 | 6 | 5 | +1 | 5 |
| 3 | Al Ahly | 3 | 0 | 2 | 1 | 2 | 4 | −2 | 2 |
| 4 | El Qanah | 3 | 0 | 1 | 2 | 3 | 5 | −2 | 1 |

Source: Soccerway
Rules for classification: 1) Points; 2) Goal difference; 3) Goals scored.
(C) Champion

=== Championship play-off matches ===
| 10 May 1963 | Tersana | 2–0 | Al Ahly |
| | Tarek Selim 42' (o.g.); El-Shazly 58' |

| 24 May 1963 | Zamalek | 3–3 | Tersana |
| | Emam 36', 46'; Mohsen 67' | | Hamdi Abdel Fattah 33'; Hanafi El-Nazer 76'; El-Shazly 81' |

| 25 May 1963 | Al Ahly | 1–1 | El Qanah |
| | El-Fanagily 86' | | Wahba 34' |

| 31 May 1963 | Zamalek | 1–1 | Al Ahly |
| | Noshi 46' | | El-Fanagily 64' |

| 2 June 1963 | Tersana | 2–1 | El Qanah |
| | El-Shazly 11', 22' | | Essmat 18' |

| 5 June 1963 | Zamalek | 2–1 | El Qanah |
| | Said Titi 1'; Emam 3' | | Adel Zain |

== Top goalscorers ==
| Rank | Player | Club | Goals |
|---|---|---|---|
| 1 | (United Arab Republic) Hassan El-Shazly | Tersana | 29 |
| 2 | (United Arab Republic) Mohamed Seddeek | Ismaily | 20 |
| 3 | (United Arab Republic) Taha Ismail | Al Ahly | 20 |
| 4 | (United Arab Republic) Hamada Emam | Zamalek | 19 |
| 5 | (United Arab Republic) Adel Zain | El Qanah | 19 |
