= Sattar Khalaf =

Iraqi association football player

Personal information
- Full name: Sattar Khalaf
- Date of birth: 1 July 1946 (age 80)
- Place of birth: Iraq
- Position: Goalkeeper

Senior career*
| Years | Team | Apps | (Gls) |
- Al-Sikak
- Al Shorta

International career
| 1968–1975 | Iraq | | |
- * Club domestic league appearances and goals

Sattar Khalaf (born 1 July 1946) is a former Iraqi football goalkeeper who played for Iraq in the 1972 AFC Asian Cup.

He played for the national team between 1968 and 1975.

== Career statistics ==
=== International goals ===
Scores and results list Iraq's goal tally first.

| No | Date | Venue | Opponent | Score | Result | Competition |
|---|---|---|---|---|---|---|
| 1. | 13 December 1971 | National Stadium, Kuwait City | Ceylon | 5–0 | 5–0 | 1972 AFC Asian Cup qualification |
