= Douglas Aziz =

Iraqi footballer

Douglas Aziz Shamasha Eshaya
Personal information
- Full name: Douglas Aziz
- Date of birth: 1 January 1942 (age 84)
- Place of birth: Habbaniyah, Al Anbar, Iraq
- Date of death: January 19, 2024
- Place of death: Los Angeles, CA, USA
- Positions: Defender; midfielder

Youth career
- 1962–1964: Nadi Athori

Senior career*
Years	Team	Apps	(Gls)
1964–1975	Aliyat Al-Shorta		
1975–1979	Al-Shorta		

International career
1967–1978	Iraq	73	(6)

Managerial career
- 1979–1983: Al-Shurta
- 1991–1992: Al-Khutot
- 1994–1995: Al-Karkh
- 1995–1996: Salahadin
- 1996–1997: Al-Ramtha
- * Club domestic league appearances and goals

Douglas Aziz Shamasha Eshaya (Syriac: ܕܧܜܓܠܐܣ ܐܙܥܙ ܣܗܐܡܐܣܗܐ ܖܣܗܐܝܐ; born 25 december 1942) is an Iraqi former football player and caretaker coach. He represented the Iraq national team, and is ethnically Assyrian.

== Club career ==
He was a pillar for club and country during the late 1960s and through the 1970s. He made his league debut in 1964 and spent 15 inspiring seasons with Aliyat Al-Shorta in the Iraq Central FA Premier League and Al-Shorta in the Iraqi Premier League, where he was a key figure in the side along with Abid Kadhim, Majeed Ali, Latif Shandal and Riyadh Nouri. He became the first outfield player in the Iraqi League to play as a goalkeeper when he was forced to go in goal for the final few minutes of a 5-2 win over Al-Tijara after an injury to Raad Hammoudi.

== International career ==
After making his international debut in 1967, Douglas quickly became a key influence as the midfield general in the heart of the Iraqi team. With the national team, he played in the 1974 World Cup qualifiers in Australia, where Iraq finished second behind the hosts, the 1972 and 1976 Asian Cups in Thailand and Iran, and in the Olympic qualifiers in 1968 and 1972. Douglas was also an important part of the Iraqi army team that won the 1972 and 1977 CISM World Military Championship. Douglas played for the Iraqi national team until 1978 and retired from playing a year later.

== Managerial career ==
He went on to coach at Al-Shurta and in his first season in charge, led the club to their first ever league title in 1979-1980. He continued to coach the club's youth teams after stepping down as head coach in 1983, but was renamed coach of the first team in 1985. In 1989, he stepped down as coach of Al-Shurta to work full-time as assistant to Under-19s coach Bill Asprey. Douglas was also assistant coach to Ammo Baba in the national team set-up from 1983–1984. He coached Al-Khutot, Salah-Al-Deen and Al-Karkh in the 1990s before leaving Iraq to settle in Arnhem, the Netherlands.

== Career statistics ==
=== International ===
Scores and results list Iraq's goal tally first.

No	Date	Venue	Opponent	Score	Result	Competition
1.	19 September 1971	Mithat Paşa Stadium, Istanbul	Lebanon	1–0	2–1	1972 Olympics qualifiers
2.	10 December 1971	Kuwait National Stadium, Kuwait City	Kuwait	1–0	1–1	1972 AFC Asian Cup qualification
3.	22 December 1971	Kuwait National Stadium, Kuwait City	Lebanon	3–0	4–1	1972 AFC Asian Cup qualification
4.	14 January 1972	Al-Shaab Stadium, Baghdad	Egypt	1–2	1–3	1972 Palestine Cup of Nations
5.	21 March 1973	Sydney Sports Ground, Sydney	Indonesia	1–0	3–2	1974 FIFA World Cup qualification
