= Said al-Sabeh =

Palestinian Political

- سعيد السبع
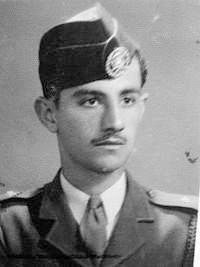

Personal details
- Born: 27 November 1926 Qalqilya, Mandatory Palestine
- Died: 30 June 1995 (aged 68) Amman, Jordan

Said al-Sabeh also spelled Said al-Sabi (Arabic: سعيد السبع; 27 November 1926 – 30 June 1995) was a Palestinian politician.

== Biography ==
He was born in Qalqilya, in British Mandatory Palestine in 1926. He studied in Qalqilya, Palestine, fought in the 1948 war and was the commander of the Holy Jihad Brigade in the vicinity of Qalqilya during the British colonization. After the death of Izz ad-Din al-Qassam, British forces stormed into his father house Nimr Alsabi and arrested him along with his son Ahmed and his brother Abdul Raheem Alsabi charging him with the association of Izz ad-Din al-Qassam group. This incident was Said political starting point which was a major shock as he was only 7 years old. Said grew to hate the British ruling even after joining the Jordanian Arabic Army many years later. He proceeded to completely nationalize the Jordanian Army and expel John Bagot Glubb out of Jordan. In 1957, he was accused of plotting a military coup against the Jordanian Monarchy in 1957 and was sentenced to death, however, he managed to escape to Syria, then to Egypt after both countries have ended their short union. He was targeted for assassination numerous times by the Israeli mossad which they all have failed. He was the first director of the Palestine Liberation Organization (PLO) in Sudan and Algeria.
