= Wagdan Shadli =

Yemeni footballer (born 2000)

Personal information
- Full name: Wagdan Mahmoud Shadli
- Date of birth: 19 August 1964 (age 62)
- Position: Right winger

Youth career
- 1979–1982: Al-Shorta

Senior career*
Years	Team	Apps	(Gls)
1982–1988	Al-Shorta		
1988–1999	Al-Wehda (Aden)		

International career
1980–1982	South Yemen youth		
1984–1989	South Yemen	4	(1)
1993	Yemen	4	(2)
- * Club domestic league appearances and goals

Wagdan Mahmoud Shadli (Arabic: وَجْدَان مَحْمُود الشَّاذِلِيّ; born 19 August 1964) is a former Yemeni international footballer.

== Club career ==
Shadli began his career with Al-Shorta, joining the club in 1979 before going on to make his debut in 1982. He went on to join Al-Wehda, and spent eleven years with the club before retiring in November 1999. Former teammate Munif Shaif stated that his decision to retire was partly due to a lack of gratitude shown to him by some Yemeni football fans, who questioned his patriotism and loyalty.

After conceding a penalty in a game against Al-Wehda (Sanaa), the crowd began throwing cans and bottles onto the pitch, leading to the security forces using tear gas against the spectators. Shadli's reaction to the penalty decision, and remonstrating with the referee, were seen as the "cause" of the riots, and he was blamed in Yemeni media for the event.

Following his retirement, he moved to Lausanne, Switzerland, citing his inability to find a job to be able to support himself and his family in Yemen.

== International career ==
Shadli represented both the South Yemeni national football team, as well as the unified Yemen football team from 1990. In total, he scored over 16 goals in over 50 appearances at international level.

== Personal life ==
Shadli has two sons, Adel and Wajd Al Chadli, both of whom played for Swiss club Sion, with Adel going on to forge a career in the United Arab Emirates.

He has worked as an advisor to the Yemeni Ministry of Youth and Sports, Nayef al-Bakri. In November 2022, he was appointed the Director General of the Ministry of Youth and Sports in Aden by the governor of Aden, Ahmed Lamlas.

In January 2023, he criticised the Yemeni government for failing to instil a footballing culture in the country, following losses to Saudi Arabia and Oman.

== Career statistics ==
=== International ===
Scores and results list South Yemen's goal tally first, score column indicates score after each Shadli goal.

List of international goals scored by Wagdan Shadli for South Yemen
No.	Date	Venue	Opponent	Score	Result	Competition
1	12 April 1985	Bahrain National Stadium, Riffa, Bahrain	Bahrain	1–0	3–3	1986 FIFA World Cup qualification

Scores and results list Yemen's goal tally first, score column indicates score after each Shadli goal.

List of international goals scored by Wagdan Shadli for Yemen
No.	Date	Venue	Opponent	Score	Result	Competition
1	22 May 1993	Al-Hassan Stadium, Irbid, Jordan	Jordan	1–1	1–1	1994 FIFA World Cup qualification
2	24 May 1993	Al-Hassan Stadium, Irbid, Jordan	Pakistan	4–1	5–1	1994 FIFA World Cup qualification
