= 1972 Palestine Cup of Nations =

1972 Palestine Cup
كأس فلسطين 1972

Tournament details
- Host country: Iraq
- Dates: 1–14 January
- Teams: 9
- Venue: 1 (in 1 host city)

Final positions
- Champions: Egypt (1st title)
- Runners-up: Iraq
- Third place: Algeria
- Fourth place: Syria

Tournament statistics
- Matches played: 24
- Goals scored: 68 (2.83 per match)

The 1972 Palestine Cup was the 1st edition of the Palestine Cup of Nations, it was held in Baghdad, Iraq between 1 and 14 January. The tournament acted as a replacement for the Arab Cup, which was otherwise not held between 1966 and 1985. Nine nations took part in the competition of which Egypt won.

== Participated teams ==
The 9 participated teams are:

- Algeria
- Egypt
- Iraq (hosts)
- Kuwait
- Libya
- Palestine
- Qatar
- South Yemen
- Syria

== Venues ==
Cities	Venues	Capacity
Baghdad	Al-Shaab Stadium	40,000

== Group stage ==
=== Group A ===
Team	Pld	W	D	L	GF	GA	GD	Pts
Iraq	3	2	1	0	6	1	+5	5
Egypt	3	1	2	0	3	1	+2	4
Kuwait	3	1	0	2	4	7	–3	2
Libya	3	0	1	2	3	7	–4	1

1 January 1972

Iraq	0–0	Egypt

Al-Shaab Stadium, Baghdad
1 January 1972

Kuwait	3–2	Libya
Goal		Al-Bahloul

Al-Shaab Stadium, Baghdad

5 January 1972

Iraq	3–0	Libya
Kadhim; Ahmed

Al-Shaab Stadium, Baghdad
5 January 1972

Egypt	2–0	Kuwait
Omasha 28'; El-Bouri 75'

Al-Shaab Stadium, Baghdad

7 January 1972

Iraq	3–1	Kuwait
Yousif; Kadhim; Hatim		Goal

Al-Shaab Stadium, Baghdad
7 January 1972

Egypt	1–1	Libya
Zizo 84'		Goal

Al-Shaab Stadium, Baghdad

=== Group B ===
Team	Pld	W	D	L	GF	GA	GD	Pts
Syria	4	4	0	0	8	3	+5	8
Algeria	4	3	0	1	9	2	+7	6
South Yemen	4	2	0	2	5	7	–2	4
Palestine	4	1	0	3	9	9	0	2
Qatar	4	0	0	4	5	15	–10	0

1 January 1972

Algeria	2–0	Palestine
Dahleb

Al-Shaab Stadium, Baghdad
1 January 1972

Syria	1–0	South Yemen

Al-Shaab Stadium, Baghdad

4 January 1972

Algeria	3–0	Qatar
Tahar 5'; Salhi 33'; Betrouni 53'

Al-Shaab Stadium, Baghdad
4 January 1972

Syria	3–1	Palestine

Al-Shaab Stadium, Baghdad

6 January 1972

Syria	3–2	Qatar

Al-Shaab Stadium, Baghdad
6 January 1972

South Yemen	2–1	Palestine

Al-Shaab Stadium, Baghdad

8 January 1972

Syria	1–0	Algeria

Al-Shaab Stadium, Baghdad
8 January 1972

South Yemen	2–1	Qatar

Al-Shaab Stadium, Baghdad

10 January 1972

South Yemen	1–4	Algeria
Goal		Hannachi 37'; Dali 41', 50'; Amar 72'

Al-Shaab Stadium, Baghdad
10 January 1972

Palestine	7–1	Qatar

Al-Shaab Stadium, Baghdad

== Knock-out stage ==
Semifinals
12 January – Baghdad
Iraq	3
Algeria	1
12 January – Baghdad
Egypt (a.e.t.)	4
Syria	2

Final
13 January – Baghdad
Iraq	1
Egypt	3
Third place
14 January – Baghdad
Algeria	3
Syria	1

=== Semi-finals ===
12 January 1972

Iraq	3–1	Algeria
Kamil; Kadhim		Dahleb (pen.)

Al-Shaab Stadium, Baghdad
12 January 1972

Egypt	4–2 (a.e.t.)	Syria
Reyadh 8'; Shehta 83'; El-Shazly 110', 117' (pen.)		Goal

Al-Shaab Stadium, Baghdad

=== 3rd place playoff ===
13 January 1972

Algeria	3–1	Syria
Dahleb 19'; Salhi 68', 75'		?

Al-Shaab Stadium, Baghdad

=== Final ===
14 January 1972

Iraq	1–3	Egypt
Aziz 35' (pen.)		El-Shazly 3'; Zizo 19', 64'

Al-Shaab Stadium, Baghdad

== Winners ==
1972 Palestine Cup winners

Egypt
First title
