= Moustafa Reyadh =

Egyptian footballer (1941–2026)

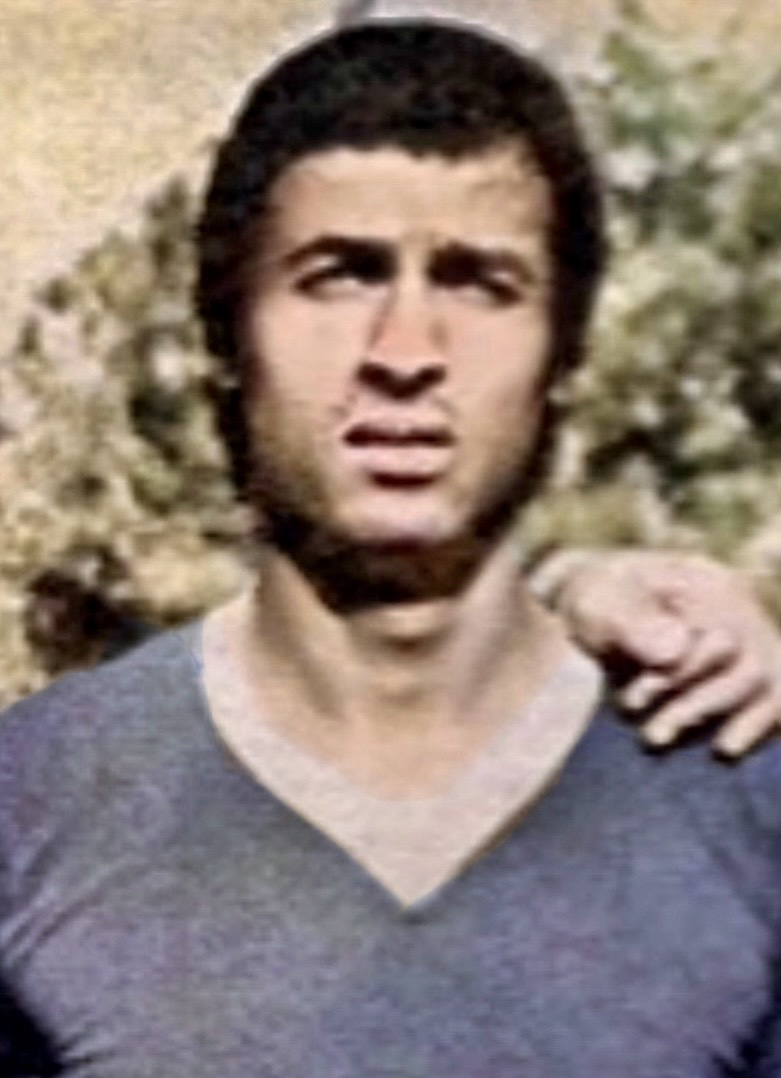

Personal information
- Full name: Ibrahim Mohammed Reyadh
- Date of birth: 5 April 1941
- Place of birth: Boulaq, Cairo, Egypt
- Date of death: 24 February 2026 (aged 84)
- Position: Forward

Youth career
- Tersana

Senior career*
Years	Team	Apps	(Gls)
1958–1971	Tersana		
1971–1973	Al-Salmiya SC	7	(3)
1973–1976	Tersana		

International career
1962–1974	Egypt	66	(26)
Medal record
Men's football
Men's Football
Representing United Arab Republic
Africa Cup of Nations
Runner-up	1962 Ethiopia
Third place	1963 Ghana
Third place	1970 Sudan
Arab Games
Gold medal – first place	1965
- * Club domestic league appearances and goals

Moustafa Reyadh (Arabic: مصطفى رياض; born Ibrahim Mohammed Reyadh (إبراهيم محمد رياض); 5 April 1941 – 24 February 2026) was an Egyptian footballer who played as a forward for Tersana and the Egypt national team.

== Career ==
Reyadh played club football for Tersana. He is the fourth all-time scorer in the Egyptian Premier League with 123 goals. He won the league title with Tersana in the 1964–65 season, as well as the Egypt Cup title twice in 1965 and 1967. He was the Egyptian Premier League's top scorer twice in 1961–62 and 1963–64 seasons.

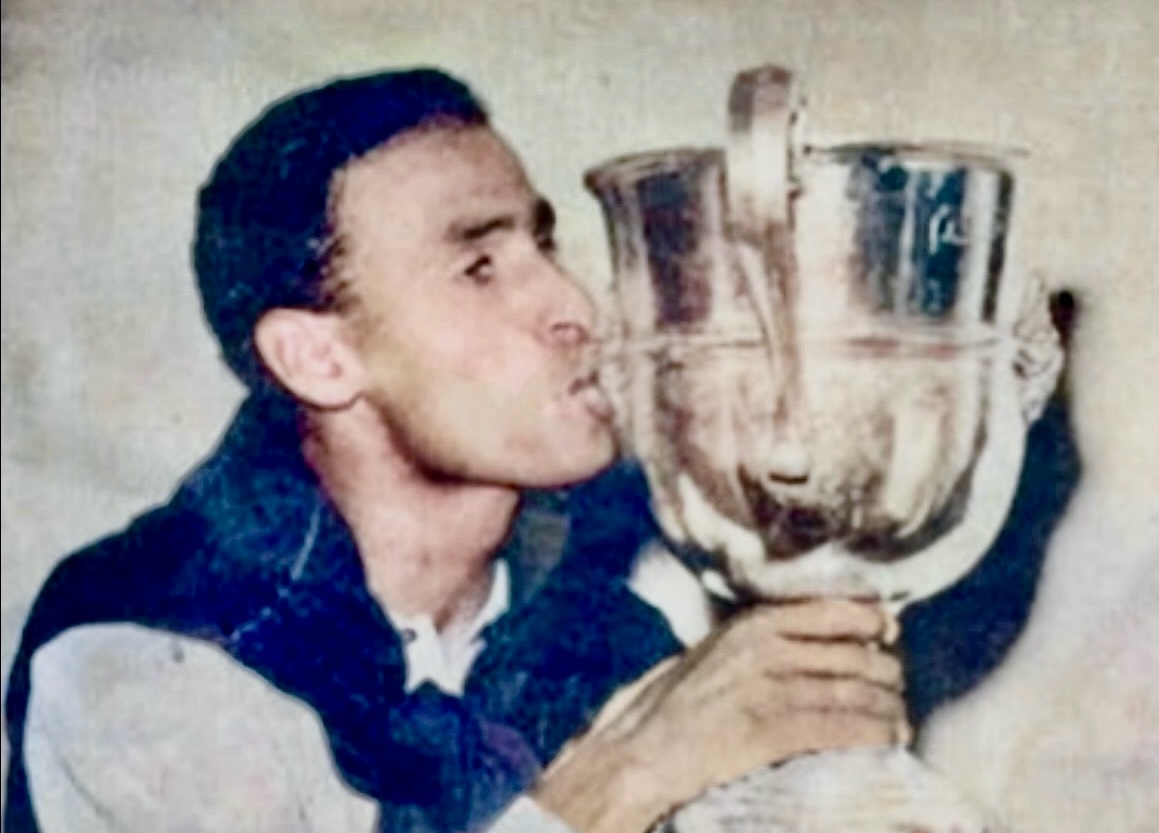
Mostafa Reyadh with the Egypt Cup trophy in 1965.

Reyadh played for the Egypt national team in the 1964 Summer Olympics in Tokyo, where he was the second top scorer with 8 goals and his country finished fourth. He also played for Egypt in the 1962, 1963 and 1970 Africa Cup of Nations. He won with his country the gold medal at the Arab Games in 1965. He also won with Egypt the Palestine Cup of Nations in 1972. He played 66 caps for his country scoring 26 goals, in the top 10 goal scorers for the Egyptian national team.

== Death ==
Reyadh died on 24 February 2026, at the age of 84.

== Honours ==
Tersana

- Egyptian Premier League: 1962–63
- Egyptian Cup: 1964–65, 1966–67

United Arab Republic

- African Cup of Nations: runner-up, 1962; 3rd place, 1963, 1970
- Arab Games gold medal: 1965
- Palestine Cup of Nations: 1972

Individual

- Egyptian Premier League top scorer: 1961–62, 1963–64
- Olympic Games second top scorer: 1964
- Egyptian Premier League 4th all-time top scorer: 123 goals
