= Palestine Cup of Nations =

- Founded: 1972
- Abolished: 1977
- Region: Arab World
- Teams: 8
- Last champions: Egypt (2nd title)
- Most championships: Egypt (2 titles)

The Palestine Cup (Arabic: كأس فلسطين, romanized: Kaʾs Filasṭīn) was a football competition which was held between countries in the Arab world. The tournament de facto acted as the replacement for the Arab Cup during the long interruption between 1966 and 1982. It was held on three occasions in Arab countries in the 1970s. The first edition was held in 1972 in Iraq.

== History ==
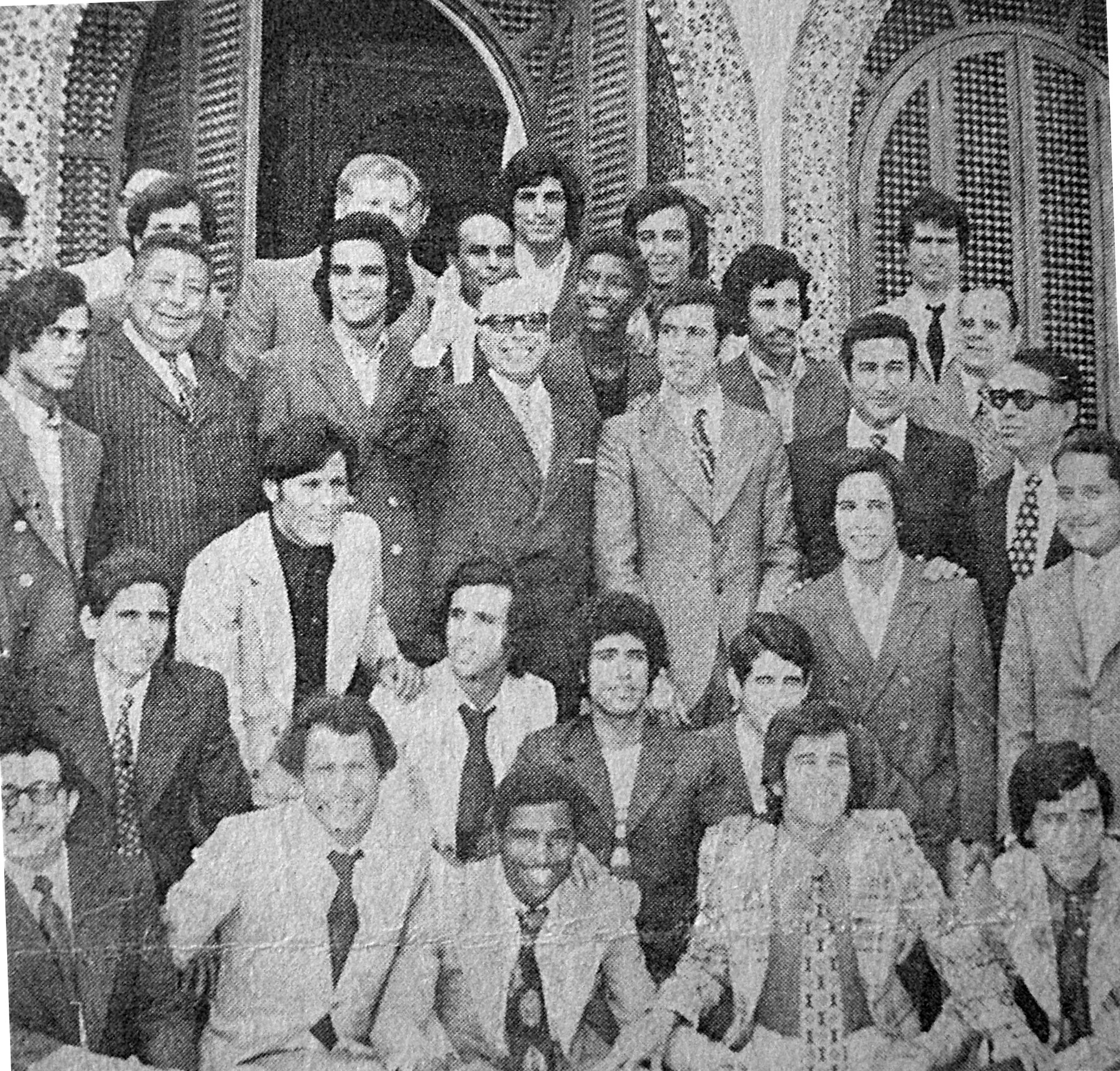
President Habib Bourguiba honors the Tunisian national team after winning the 1973 Palestine Cup in Libya

The cup was established in 1972 at the initiative of Said al-Sabeh, president of the Supreme Council for Palestinian Youth Welfare. The aim of the initiative was to create a new Arab championship that would reunite sport in the Arab countries, as well as with the aim of proving Arab affiliation and support for the Palestinian cause. The tournament was also created to be an alternative to the Arab Cup, which had been suspended after the third edition. Iraq was chosen to host the first edition in the same year, and eight Arab countries took part in the tournament, but only three editions were organised. After the return of the Arab Cup in 1982, the Palestine Cup became a tournament for youth teams under the name Palestine Cup for Youth.

== Results ==
Ed.	Year	Host	Final			Third Place Match			Teams
Ed.	Year	Host	(gold) Champion	Score	(silver) Runner-up	(bronze) Third place	Score	Fourth place	Teams
1	1972	Iraq	Egypt	3–1	Iraq	Algeria	3–1	Syria	9
2	1973	Libya	Tunisia	4–0	Syria	Algeria	0–0 (3–0 p)	Iraq	10
3	1975	Tunisia	Egypt	1–0 (a.e.t.)	Iraq	Sudan	1–0	Syria	10
–	1977	Saudi Arabia	Canceled			Canceled			–

=== Teams reaching the top four ===
Team	Titles	Runners-up	Third-place	Fourth-place	Total
Egypt	2 (1972, 1975)	—	—	—	2
Tunisia	1 (1973)	—	—	—	1
Iraq	—	2 (1972, 1975)	—	1 (1973)	3
Syria	—	1 (1973)	—	2 (1972, 1975)	3
Algeria	—	—	2 (1972, 1973)	—	2
Sudan	—	—	1 (1975)	—	1

== Summary ==
Rank	Team	Part	M	W	D	L	GF	GA	GD	Points
1	Egypt	3	13	9	2	2	29	10	+19	29
2	Syria	3	16	9	1	6	31	28	+3	28
3	Iraq	3	15	7	5	3	25	10	+15	26
4	Algeria	2	12	7	3	2	32	7	+25	24
5	Tunisia	2	8	7	1	0	23	4	+19	22
6	Sudan	1	4	2	1	1	3	3	0	7
7	Palestine	3	10	2	1	7	13	24	-11	7
8	South Yemen	2	8	2	1	5	6	34	-28	7
9	Libya	3	9	1	3	5	17	15	+2	6
10	Kuwait	1	3	1	0	2	4	7	-3	3
11	Yemen (Note: Includes participations as North Yemen from 1967–1990; see below.)	2	6	1	0	5	3	20	-17	3
12	United Arab Emirates	2	6	0	2	4	3	15	-12	2
13	Saudi Arabia	1	2	0	0	2	1	3	-2	0
14	Qatar	1	4	0	0	4	5	15	-10	0

== See also ==
- FIFA Arab Cup
