= South Yemen national football team =

National football team of South Yemen (1965–1989)

South Yemen
- Association: PDR Yemen Football Federation إتحاد اليمن الديمقراطي لكرة القدم
- Most caps: Abubakar Al-Mass (12)
- Top scorer: Mohammed Hussein (3)
- Home stadium: Mortayer Yard
- FIFA code: YMD
First colours	Second colours

First international
- Palestine 1–0 Aden (Cairo, United Arab Republic; 2 September 1965)

Last international
- South Yemen 1–0 Guinea (Kuwait City, Kuwait; 5 November 1989)

Biggest win
- South Yemen 2–0 Iraq (Aden, South Yemen; 2 May 1974); South Yemen 2–0 Mauritania (Damascus, Syria; 12 October 1976)

Biggest defeat
- Algeria 15–1 South Yemen (Tripoli, Libya; 17 August 1973); United Arab Republic 14–0 Aden (Cairo, United Arab Republic; 3 September 1965)

AFC Asian Cup
- Appearances: 1 (first in 1976)
- Best result: Group stage (1976)

The South Yemen national football team (Arabic: منتخب اليمن الجنوبي لكرة القدم), recognised as Yemen DPR by FIFA, represented South Yemen in men's international football, playing as one of two Yemeni teams, along with North Yemen.

After Yemeni unification in 1990, the PDR Yemen Football Federation, and with it the South Yemeni team, joined the Yemen Football Association (YFA) and the North Yemen national football team.

== History ==
=== Aden (1965) ===
The first international tournament in South Yemen was the Football at the 1965 Pan Arab Games, which at the time was the State of Aden in the Federation of South Arabia. The tournament was hosted in United Arab Republic where it was eliminated on the group stage, losing 1–0 to Palestine, 14–0 to United Arab Republic being their biggest defeat, 6–0 to Iraq and 4–3 to Lebanon.

=== South Yemen (1967–1990) ===
The first participation of the newly independent, South Yemen was in the 1972 Palestine Cup of Nations, where in their group, they lost 0–1 against Syria, beat Palestine and Qatar, both 2–1, and in the last round, they lost against Algeria by 1–4.

South Yemen has only played in the AFC Asian Cup since the 1976 edition, qualifying automatically, due to the other teams having given up playing in the knockout tournament, with the final tournament being held in Iran. They were placed in Group B with the hosts Iran and Iraq. South Yemen lost to Iraq 0–1 and then Iran 0–8 in the group stage.

South Yemen competed in qualification for the only time for the 1986 FIFA World Cup in Mexico. They were placed in Group 4 of Zone A in the first round against Iran and Bahrain. Iran was disqualified before the games were played, due to refusal to move their games to neutral grounds away from the Iran–Iraq War. South Yemen hosted Bahrain on 12 March 1985 and lost 4–1 in Mortayer Yard (now 22 May Stadium), Aden. On 12 April they drew, 3–3, at the Bahrain National Stadium in Manama after leading 3–1. This saw Bahrain advance through.

Team	Pld	W	D	L	GF	GA	GD	Pts
Bahrain	2	1	1	0	7	4	+3	3
South Yemen	2	0	1	1	4	7	−3	1
Iran	Disqualified							

	(Bahrain)	(Iran)	(South Yemen)
Bahrain	—	—	3–3
Iran	—	—	—
South Yemen	1–4	—	—

After that campaign, they would play again three later against Djibouti in a friendly, months later, they played for the 1988 AFC Asian Cup qualification losing 0–1 to Indonesia, drawing 1–1 against South Korea, and in the end losing 0–2 to Bahrain, being at the bottom of the group.

The last time The South Falcons took to the field was at the 1989 Peace and Friendship Cup tournament held in Kuwait, where in their group, they lost 0–2 to the Iran, also lost to Iraq but 2–6, and in the last one played by South Yemen, they won 1–0 against Guinea.

With the Yemeni unification in May 1990, the South Yemen team was dissolved, and its players migrated to the newly created Yemen, but it was the North Yemen which was considered the legitimate predecessor of the now Yemeni team.

== Competitive record ==
=== FIFA World Cup record ===
FIFA World Cup									Qualification record					
Year	Result	Position	Pld	W	D*	L	GF	GA	Pld	W	D	L	GF	GA
as Aden
(Uruguay) 1930	Part of United Kingdom								Part of United Kingdom					
(Italy) 1934	Part of United Kingdom								Part of United Kingdom					
(France) 1938	Part of United Kingdom								Part of United Kingdom					
(Brazil) 1950	Part of United Kingdom								Part of United Kingdom					
(Switzerland) 1954	Part of United Kingdom								Part of United Kingdom					
(Sweden) 1958	Part of United Kingdom								Part of United Kingdom					
(Chile) 1962	Part of United Kingdom								Part of United Kingdom					
(England) 1966	Part of United Kingdom								Part of United Kingdom					
as South Yemen
(Mexico) 1970	Did not enter								Did not enter					
(West Germany) 1974	Did not enter								Did not enter					
(Argentina) 1978	Did not enter								Did not enter					
(Spain) 1982	Did not enter								Did not enter					
(Mexico) 1986	Did not qualify								2	0	1	1	4	7
(Italy) 1990	Withdrew								Withdrew					
Total	–	0/6	0	0	0	0	0	0	2	0	1	1	4	7

=== AFC Asian Cup record ===
AFC Asian Cup record										Qualification record					
Year	Result	Position	Pld	W	D	L	GF	GA	Squad	Pld	W	D*	L	GF	GA
as Aden
(Hong Kong) 1956	Not member of AFC									Not member of AFC					
(South Korea) 1960	Not member of AFC									Not member of AFC					
(Israel) 1964	Not member of AFC									Not member of AFC					
as South Yemen
(Iran) 1968	Not member of AFC									Not member of AFC					
(Thailand) 1972	Did not enter									Did not enter					
(Iran) 1976	Group stage	6th	2	0	0	2	0	9	Squad	Qualified by default					
(Kuwait) 1980	Withdrew									Withdrew					
(Singapore) 1984	Withdrew									Withdrew					
(Qatar) 1988	Did not qualify									3	0	1	2	1	4
Total	Group stage	1/9	2	0	0	2	0	9	—	3	0	1	2	1	4

=== Asian Games ===
Asian Games record
Year	Result	Position	Pld	W	D*	L	GF	GA
(India) 1951– (Thailand) 1978	Did not participate							
(India) 1982	Group stage	15th	3	0	0	3	1	8
(South Korea) 1986	Did not participate							
Total	Group stage	1/10	3	0	0	3	1	8

=== Pan Arab Games ===
Pan Arab Games record
Year	Result	Position	Pld	W	D*	L	GF	GA
(Egypt) 1953	Did not enter							
(Lebanon) 1957	Did not enter							
(Morocco) 1961	Did not enter							
(United Arab Republic) 1965	Group stage	9th	4	0	0	4	3	25
(Syria) 1976	Fourth place	4th	6	3	1	2	7	8
(Morocco) 1985	Did not enter							
Total	Fourth place	2/6	10	3	1	6	10	33

=== Palestine Cup of Nations ===
Palestine Cup of Nations record
Year	Result	Position	Pld	W	D*	L	GF	GA
(Iraq) 1972	Group stage	5th	4	2	0	2	5	7
(Syria) 1973	Group stage	9th	4	0	1	3	1	27
(Tunisia) 1975	Did not enter							
Total	Group stage	2/3	8	2	1	5	6	34

== Coaches ==
No.	Name	Period
1	(South Yemen) Nasr Al-Shazly	1972
2	(South Yemen) (Egypt) Ali Mohsen Al-Moraisi	1975–1976
3	(South Yemen) Abbas Ghulam	1982
4	(Kazakh Soviet Socialist Republic) Timur Segizbaev	1982–1985
5	(South Yemen) Azzam Khalifa	?–March 1985
6	(South Yemen) Abdullah Saleh Khobani	April 1985–?
7	(South Yemen) Awad Awadan	1986–?
8	(South Yemen) Abbas Ghulam	1988
9	(South Yemen) Mubarak Qadhi	1989

== Results and head-to-head records ==
=== Results Review ===
Nation	Confederation	P	W	D	L	Win %	GF	GA	GD
South Yemen	AFC (Asia)	44	9	5	30	26.92%	41	142	–101

=== Head to head records ===
Key

Positive balance
Neutral balance
Negative balance

The list shown below shows the South Yemen national football team all-time international record against opposing nations.

Head to head records
Opponent	P	W	D	L	GF	GA	GD
Algeria	2	0	0	2	2	19	–17
China	3	0	0	3	8	17	–9
Bahrain	3	0	1	2	4	9	–5
Djibouti	1	0	0	1	1	4	–3
Egypt	2	0	0	2	0	19	–19
Ethiopia	1	0	1	0	1	1	0
Guinea	1	1	0	0	1	0	+1
Indonesia	1	0	0	1	0	1	–1
Iran	3	0	0	3	0	12	–12
Iraq	6	1	0	5	4	18	–14
Japan	1	0	0	1	1	3	–2
Jordan	2	1	0	1	4	4	0
Kuwait	1	0	0	1	1	5	–4
Lebanon	1	0	0	1	3	4	–1
Libya	1	0	0	1	0	10	–10
Mauritania	1	1	0	0	2	0	+2
Morocco	1	0	0	1	0	4	–4
Palestine	3	1	1	1	2	2	0
Qatar	1	1	0	0	2	1	+1
Saudi Arabia	2	2	0	0	2	0	+2
South Korea	2	0	1	1	1	4	–3
Sudan	1	0	0	0	1	1	–1
Syria	3	1	0	2	3	4	–1
United Arab Emirates	1	0	1	0	0	0	0
Totals	44	9	5	30	41	142	–101

== Player records ==
As of 5 November 1989

Top goalscorers
Rank	Name	Goals	Caps	Ratio	Career
1	Mohammed Hussein	3	2	1.5	1989
2	Abubakar Ibrahim Al-Mass	2	12	0.17	1975–1988
3	Adnan Ahmed Al-Sabou	1	–	–	1982–1985
3	Jamil Saif	1	–	–	1973–1976
3	Saleem Ahmed Mehdi	1	3	0.33	1982
3	Kassim Tariq Abdullah	1	–	–	1985–1988
3	Maher Hassan Saleh	1	3	0.33	1988
3	Wagdan Mahmoud Shadli	1	–	–	1985–1989
