= Tersana SC =

Association football club in Giza, Egypt

Tersana
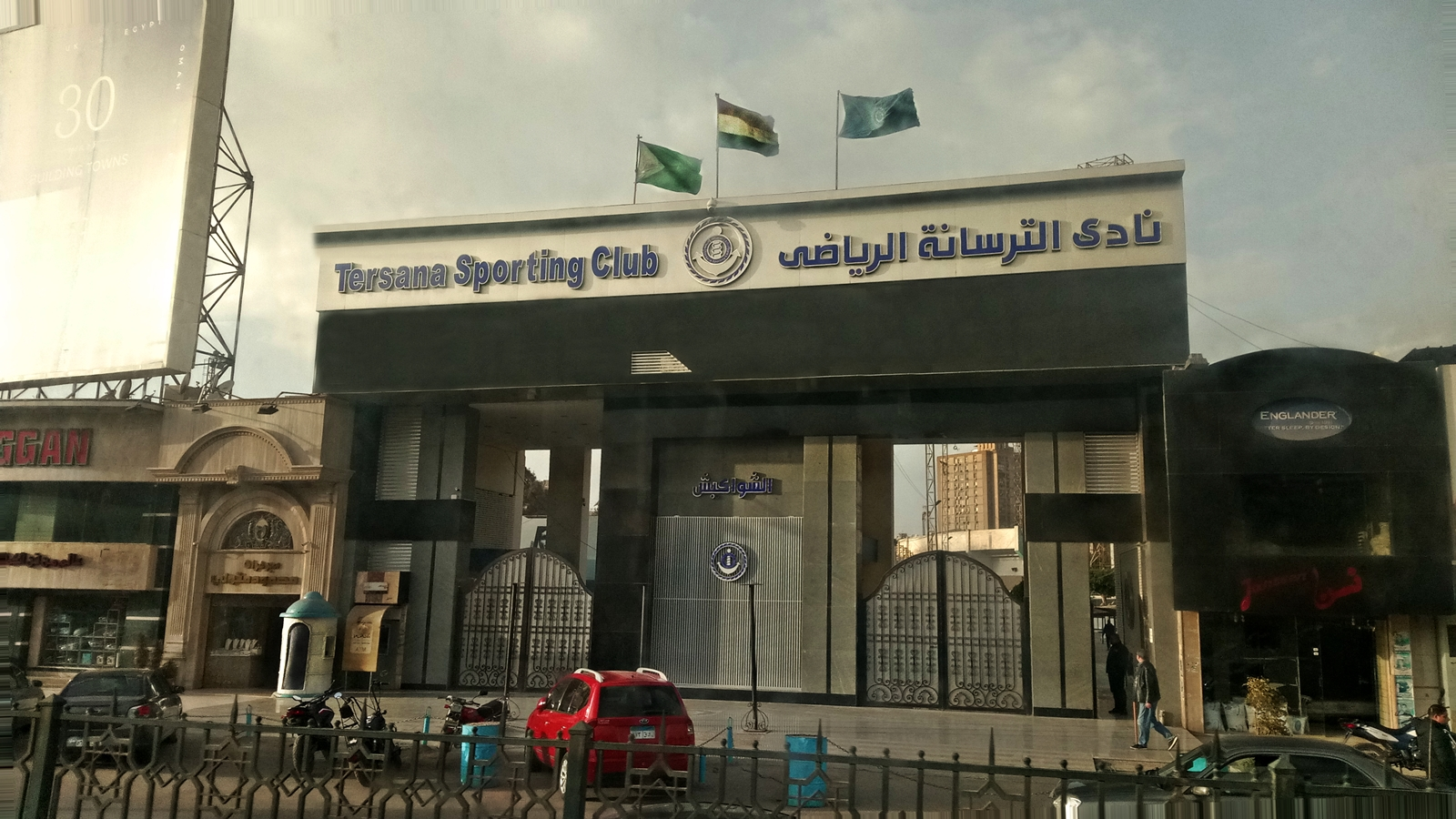
- Full name: Tersana Sporting Club نادي الترسانة للألعاب الرياضية
- Nickname: The Hammers
- Short name: TER
- Founded: 1921; 105 years ago
- Ground: Mit Okba Stadium, Giza, Egypt
- Capacity: 15,000
- Chairman: Tarek El saed
- Manager: Coshare
- League: Egyptian Second Division A
- 2023–24: Egyptian Second Division B, 1st (Group B)
Home colours	Away colours

Tersana Sporting Club (Arabic: نادي الترسانة للألعاب الرياضية) is an Egyptian sports club based in Meet Okba, Giza, Egypt. It is best known for its professional football team, which plays in the Egyptian Second Division, the second-highest tier in the Egyptian football league system.

Tersana's most important accomplishments include winning the Egypt Cup title six times and the Egyptian league title once. On the continental side, Tersana also participated in the CAF Cup Winners' Cup once in 1987 and was eliminated in the second round by Tunisian Espérance. The first leg, played in Cairo, ended with a draw, while the second leg, played in Tunisia ended in a 0–2 loss.

== History ==
The Tersana SC was established in 1921, when Egypt was a British protectorate, by English Major E.W. Slaughter. He became the first president of the club which was based first in Bulaq, then to Agouza, and to its current headquarters in Mit Okba in 1958.

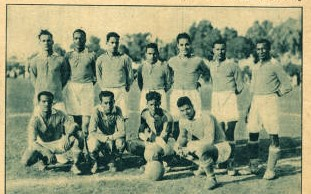
Tersana team, Champions of Sultan Hussein Cup, 1928

The main reason for its establishment was to serve the staff of the Maritime Administration (currently the Ministry of Irrigation), so it was called Tersana. Blue uniforms were chosen to represent the sea.

There are different explanations for the nickname 'Hammers', typically signifying the hardness of the team. The most famous legend involves the team recruiting a number of former fedayeen.

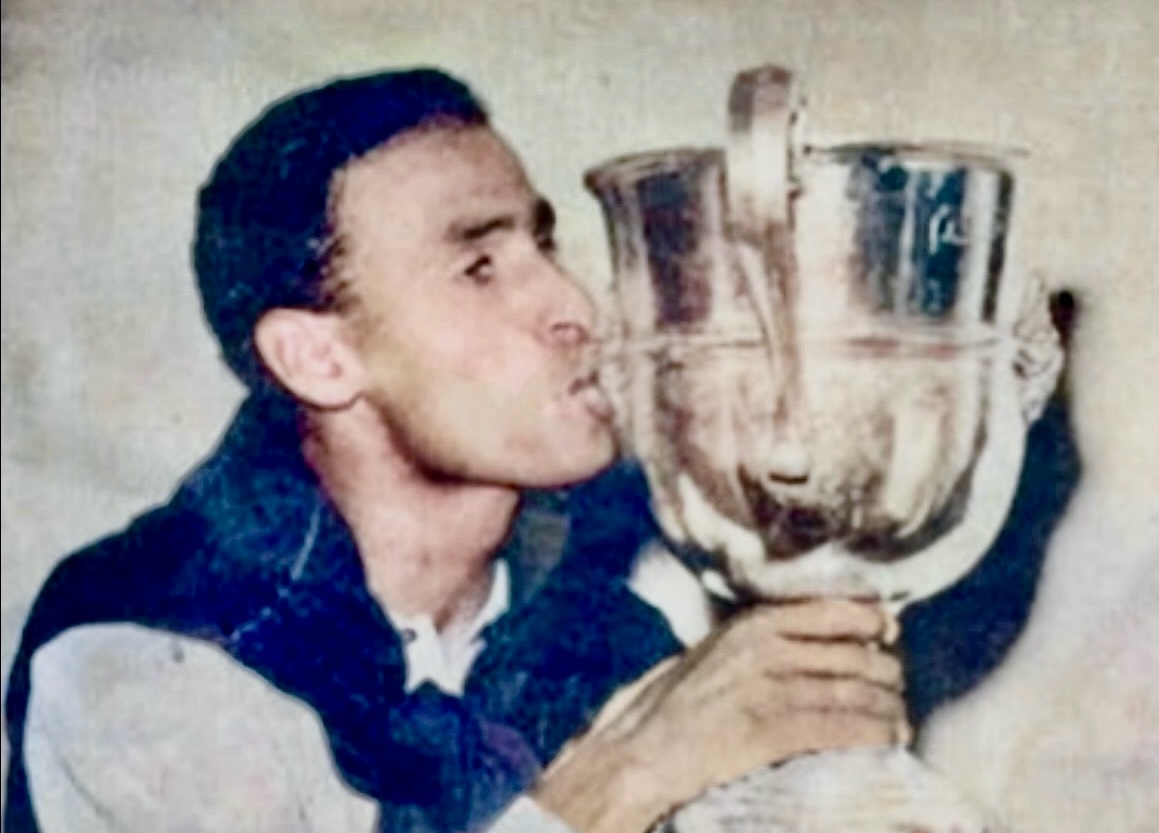
Moustafa Reyadh with Egypt Cup trophy in 1965

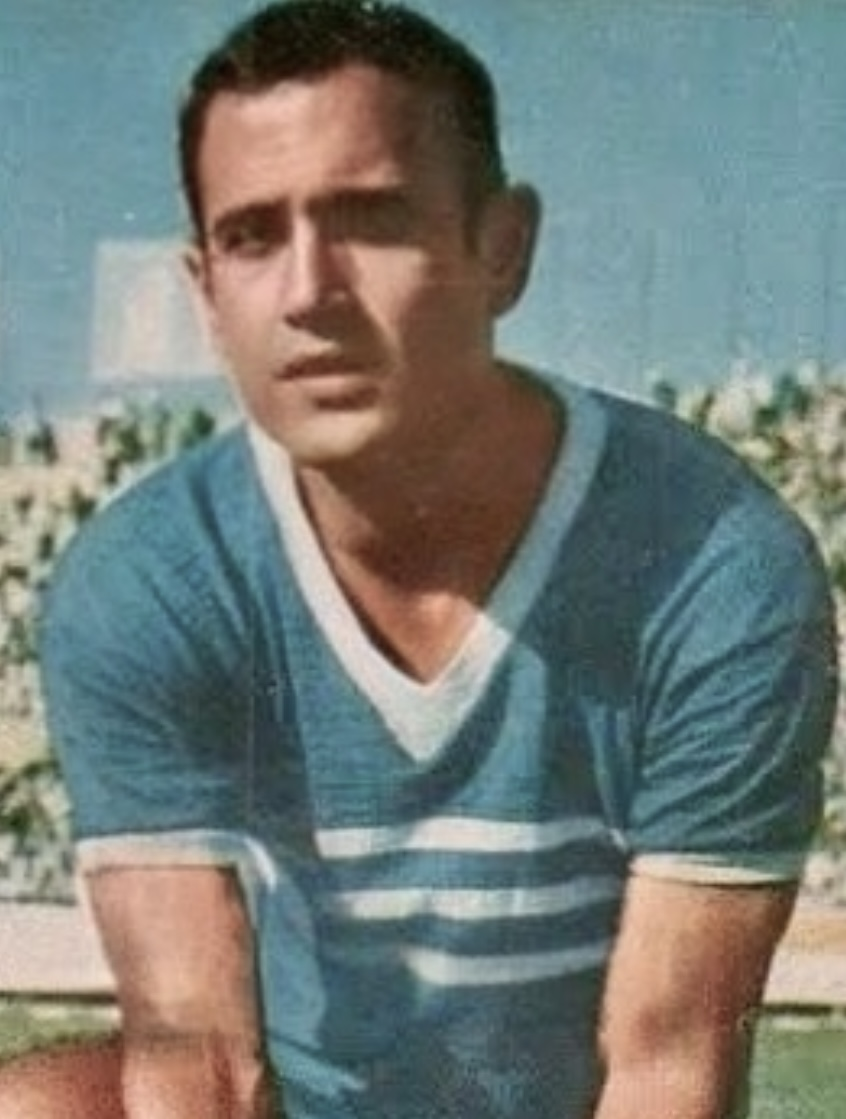
Hassan El-Shazly with Tersana in 1967

The nickname was popularized by sports critics Abdul Majid Noman and Najib Almstkawi after the intervention of defender Fouad Gouda, causing injury on foot Saleh Selim.

== Record ==
=== Top scorers in Egyptian Premier League ===
==== By season ====
Season	Player	Goals
1949–50	(Sudan) Hamdeto Ahmed	10
1953–54	(Egypt) Abdel Nabi Mahmoud	21
1956–57	(Egypt) Hamdi Abdel Fattah	22
1957–58	(Egypt) Hamdi Abdel Fattah	19
1959–60	(Egypt) Hamdi Abdel Fattah	14
1961–62	(Egypt) Moustafa Reyadh	20
1962–63	(Egypt) Hassan El-Shazly	29
1963–64	(Egypt) Moustafa Reyadh	26
1964–65	(Egypt) Hassan El-Shazly	23
1965–66	(Egypt) Hassan El-Shazly	18
1974–75	(Egypt) Hassan El-Shazly	34

==== Total goals for Tersana ====
#	Player	Goals
1	(Egypt) Hassan El-Shazly	173
2	(Egypt) Moustafa Reyadh	123
3	(Egypt) Hamdi Abdel Fattah	92
4	(Egypt) Mohamed Ramadan	40
5	(Egypt) Badawi Abdel Fattah	39
6	(Egypt) Mahmoud Hassan	38
7	(Egypt) Gamal Abdel Halim	31
8	(Egypt) Abdel Nabi Mahmoud	30
9	(Egypt) Mohamed Aboutraika	27
10	(Egypt) Abdel Mohsen El-Tonsi	22

=== Egyptian caps ===
#	Player	Caps	Goals
1	(Egypt) Hassan El-Shazly	62	42
2	(Egypt) Moustafa Reyadh	46	21
3	(Egypt) Mohamed Ramadan	41	10
4	(Egypt) Hamza Abdel Mawla	31	2
5	(Egypt) Hassan Ali	29	0
6	(Egypt) Ali Maher	28	10
7	(Egypt) Hamdi Abdel Fattah	22	9
8	(Egypt) Mohamed Aboul Ezz	18	1
9	(Egypt) Mahmoud Hassan	16	5
10	(Egypt) Shaker Abdel Fattah	14	2

=== Formal records ===
- Egyptian Premier League
  - Tersana holds the record for highest goals in a single season with 71 in 1963–64.
  - Hassan El-Shazly has the highest goals by a player with 34 in 1974–75.
  - Hassan El-Shazly has the most hat-tricks with ten.
  - Hassan El-Shazly is top league scorer with 173 goals.
  - Hassan El-Shazly won top scorer in record four seasons
- Africa Cup of Nations
  - Hassan El-Shazly has the most hat-tricks with two, in Nigeria 1963 and Ivory Coast 1970.
  - Hassan El-Shazly is most valuable player in 1963.
  - Hassan El-Shazly is top scorer in 1963 with six goals
  - Hassan El-Shazly is top Egyptian scorer and fourth top scorer with 12 goals
- 1964 Summer Olympics
  - Moustafa Reyadh is second top scorer with 8 goals
  - Moustafa Reyadh is the only Egyptian player to score 6 goals in one match

== Rivalry ==
The Mit Okba Derby is a football match between Tersana SC and Zamalek SC. The two Egyptian clubs have been rivals since their creations, and have both contested in the Egyptian Premier League, the country's top-flight football league.

Tersana SC won the league title in the 1962–63 season, while Zamalek won the title 14 times. The largest winning margin in this derby was 7–3 for Zamalek, in the 1962–63 season.

=== Statistics ===
Competition	Total	Tersana Wins	Draws	Zamalek Wins	Tersana Goals	Zamalek Goals
Egyptian Premier League	91	11	19	61	65	167
Egypt Cup	16	5	3	8	15	23
Sultan Hussein Cup	2	2	0	0	2	0
October League	2	1	0	1	2	2
Total	111	19	22	70	84	192

== Honours ==
- Egyptian Premier League
  - Winners (1): 1962–63
  - Runners up (5): 1948–49, 1949–50, 1959–60, 1963–64, 1974–75
- Egypt Cup
  - Winners (6): 1923, 1929, 1954, 1965, 1967, 1986
  - Runners up (3): 1950, 1956, 1966
- Sultan Hussein Cup
  - Winners (2): 1928, 1930
  - Runners up (2): 1926, 1931
- Cairo League
  - Winners (1): 1932–33
  - Runners up (4): 1930–31, 1933–34, 1947–48, 1949–50

=== Performance in the Egyptian Premier League ===
Season	G	W	D	L	GF	GA	GD	Pts	Position	Group	Notes
1948–49	21	11	5	5	33	24	9	27	Runner up		
1949–50	19	10	3	6	31	24	7	23	Runner up		
1950–51	18	8	4	6	17	14	3	20	4th		
1952–53	18	9	2	7	42	38	4	20	4th		
1953–54	18	10	1	7	54	27	27	21	3rd		
1955–56	20	4	8	8	22	31	−9	16	8th		
1956–57	26	9	7	10	36	39	−3	25	7th		
1957–58	14	7	3	4	36	18	18	17	4th	Group A	
1958–59	18	7	7	4	32	24	8	21	3rd		
1959–60	18	11	5	2	39	20	19	27	Runner up		
1960–61	18	6	8	4	28	23	5	20	3rd		
1961–62	18	12	1	5	36	21	15	25	3rd		
1962–63	27	19	3	5	66	41	25	41	Champion	Group B	
1963–64	24	16	3	5	71	34	37	35	Runner up	Group A	
1964–65	22	10	7	5	48	28	30	27	3rd		
1965–66	21	9	5	7	37	27	10	23	4th		
1966–67	22	11	6	5	31	20	11	28	3rd		
1972–73	22	9	6	7	18	18	0	24	6th		
1974–75	34	22	8	4	43	19	24	52	Runner up		
1975–76	22	10	6	6	32	18	14	26	6th	Group B	
1976–77	28	9	8	11	22	26	-4	26	8th		
1977–78	26	9	7	10	18	21	-3	25	9th		
1978–79	22	7	7	8	11	19	-8	21	8th		
1979–80	30	10	7	13	17	25	-8	27	11th		
1980–81	26	5	9	12	21	28	-7	19	12th		
1981–82	26	6	9	11	14	23	-9	21	11th		Relegation
1983–84	22	6	7	9	15	21	-6	19	8th		
1984–85	22	9	5	8	26	21	5	23	5th		
1985–86	22	8	7	7	17	15	2	23	6th		
1986–87	22	8	10	4	18	16	2	34	3rd		
1987–88	22	6	7	9	25	27	-2	25	6th		
1988–89	22	10	2	10	25	25	0	32	5th		
1990–91	34	11	13	10	25	24	1	35	9th		
1991–92	26	2	14	10	16	28	-12	18	13th		Relegation
1993–94	26	6	9	11	19	27	-8	21	12th		Relegation
1995–96	30	5	10	15	16	35	19	25	14th		Relegation
2000–01	26	6	9	11	33	45	-12	27	11th		
2001–02	26	8	6	12	36	45	9	30	8th		
2002–03	26	8	6	12	32	43	11	30	10th		
2003–04	26	6	8	12	31	39	-8	26	11th		
2004–05	26	6	7	13	25	42	-17	25	13th		Relegation
2006–07	30	6	13	11	26	28	-2	31	12th		
2007–08	30	8	8	14	30	40	-10	32	11th		
2008–09	30	5	9	16	29	45	-16	24	15th		Relegation
Egyptian Premier League	1046	380	295	371	1319	1216	103	1137			

=== Performance in CAF competitions ===
- FR = First round
- SR = Second round

Season	Competition	Round	Country	Club	Home	Away	Aggregate
1964–65	African Cup of Champions Clubs	SR	Ethiopia	Cotton Factory	w/o (Note: Cotton Factory won on walkover after Tersana withdrew.)		
1987	African Cup Winners' Cup	FR	Rwanda	Mukura Victory Sports	5–0	1–1	6–1
1987	African Cup Winners' Cup	SR	Tunisia	Espérance de Tunis	0–0	0–2	0–2

=== Performance in Arab competitions ===
- Arab Club Championship: 1 appearance
  - 1987 – Fourth place

Season	Competition	Round	Country	Club	Result
1987	Arab Club Championship	Group Stage	(Iraq)	Al-Jaish	1 – 0
1987	Arab Club Championship	Group Stage	(Algeria)	JE Tizi Ouzou	0 – 0
1987	Arab Club Championship	Group Stage	(Saudi Arabia)	Al-Hilal	0 – 0
1987	Arab Club Championship	Group Stage	(Qatar)	Al-Arabi	3 – 1
1987	Arab Club Championship	Semi-finals	(Saudi Arabia)	Ittihad	0 – 1
1987	Arab Club Championship	3rd Place	(Algeria)	JE Tizi Ouzou	1 – 2

== Board of directors ==
Position	Staff
President	(Egypt) Ahmed mohsen
Vice-president	(Egypt) Salah Abdel Fattah
Treasurer	(Egypt) Ayman Ali
Member	(Egypt) Ahmed Salman
Member	(Egypt) Ragab Abdel Latif
Member	(Egypt) Ahmed El-Khateb
Member	(Egypt) Naser Afify
Member	(Egypt) Mohamed Hasan El-Shazli
Member	(Egypt) Ghalia Hasan

== Current squad ==
Note: Flags indicate national team as defined under FIFA eligibility rules; some limited exceptions apply. Players may hold more than one non-FIFA nationality.

No.	Pos.	Nation	Player
—	GK	EGY	Ahmed Khattab
—	GK	EGY	Amr Gaber
—	DF	EGY	Belal Salem
—	DF	EGY	Ahmed Emad
—	DF	EGY	Bassam Hassan
—	DF	EGY	Youssef Khaled
—	DF	EGY	Morsi
—	DF	EGY	Mohamed Ateya
—	DF	EGY	Amar Mohsen
—	DF	EGY	Hesham Ragab
—	DF	EGY	Karim Zekry
—	DF	EGY	Nour El-Garhi
—	MF	EGY	Amr Samir

No.	Pos.	Nation	Player
—	MF	EGY	Sherif Dabo
—	MF	EGY	Ahmed Hisham
—	MF	EGY	Abdel Rahman Magdi
—	MF	EGY	Moustafa Damdam
—	MF	EGY	Moustafa Naser
—	MF	EGY	Karem Fathalla
—	MF	EGY	Hussein Ghouniem
—	MF	EGY	Mohamed El-Shami
—	MF	EGY	Khaled Rabea
—	FW	EGY	Abdalla Naser
—	FW	EGY	Wa'el Abdel Fattah
—	FW	EGY	Mahmoud Zanati

== Current technical staff ==
Position	Name
Manager	(Egypt) Alaa Nouh
Assistant manager	(Egypt) Yasser Farouk
First-team coaches	(Egypt) Mo'men Abdel Ghafaar
Goalkeeping coach	(Egypt) Hassan Ali
Chart Loads	(Egypt) Hussein Mohamed
Director of Players Affairs	(Egypt) Hossam Mabrouk
Administrative	(Egypt) Hatem Mohamed
Administrative	(Egypt) Ibrahim Hassan
Injury Specialist	(Egypt) Sayed Hamed

== Notable players ==
- (Egypt) Abdel Halim El-Hamalawi
- (Egypt) Abdel Kader Mohamed
- (Sudan) Abdel Khair Saleh
- (Egypt) Abdel Nabi Mahmoud
- (Egypt) Ahmed Nagui
- (Egypt) Ali Maher
- (Egypt) Ali Mohamed Riad
- (Egypt) Badawi Abdel Fattah
- (Egypt) Fathi Baioumy
- (Egypt) Gamal Abdel Halim
- (Sudan) Hamdeto Ahmed
- (Egypt) Hamdi Abdel Fattah
- (Egypt) Hamza Abdel Mawla
- (Egypt) Hassan Ali
- (Egypt) Hassan Allouba
- (Egypt) Hassan El-Shazly
- (Egypt) Hossam Hassan
- (Mozambique) João Rafael Kapango
- (Egypt) Mahmoud El-Shaghbi
- (Egypt) Mahmoud Hassan
- (Egypt) Mahmoud Fouad
- (Egypt) Mohamed Abdel Wahed
- (Egypt) Mohamed Aboul Ezz
- (Egypt) Mohamed Aboutraika
- (Egypt) Mohamed Ramadan
- (Syria) Mouhanad Boushi
- (Egypt) Mohei Sharshar
- (Egypt) Moustafa Reyadh
- (Egypt) Raafat Mekki
- (Egypt) Shaker Abdel Fattah
