= Egypt national football team =

Men's association football team

Egypt
- Nickname: The Pharaohs
- Association: Egyptian Football Association (EFA)
- Confederation: CAF (Africa)
- Sub-confederation: UNAF (North Africa)
- Head coach: Ali Maher
- Captain: Mohamed Salah
- Most caps: Ahmed Hassan (184)
- Top scorer: Mohamed Salah (70)
- Home stadium: Various
- FIFA code: EGY
First colours	Second colours

FIFA ranking
- Current: 26 ▼1 (18 November 2026)
- Highest: 9 (July – September, December 2010)
- Lowest: 75 (March 2013)

First international
- Italy 2–1 Egypt (Ghent, Belgium; 28 August 1920)

Biggest win
- United Arab Republic 15–0 Laos (Jakarta, Indonesia; 15 November 1963)

Biggest defeat
- Italy 11–3 Egypt (Amsterdam, Netherlands; 9 June 1928)

World Cup
- Appearances: 4 (first in 1934)
- Best result: Round of 16 (1934, 2026)

Africa Cup of Nations
- Appearances: 27 (first in 1957)
- Best result: Champions (1957, 1959, 1986, 1998, 2006, 2008, 2010)

Confederations Cup
- Appearances: 2 (first in 1999)
- Best result: Group stage (1999, 2009)
Medal record
Men's football
Africa Cup of Nations
Gold medal – first place	1957 Sudan	Team
Gold medal – first place	1959 United Arab Republic	Team
Gold medal – first place	1986 Egypt	Team
Gold medal – first place	1998 Burkina Faso	Team
Gold medal – first place	2006 Egypt	Team
Gold medal – first place	2008 Ghana	Team
Gold medal – first place	2010 Angola	Team
Silver medal – second place	1962 Ethiopia	Team
Silver medal – second place	2017 Gabon	Team
Silver medal – second place	2021 Cameroon	Team
Bronze medal – third place	1963 Ghana	Team
Bronze medal – third place	1970 Sudan	Team
Bronze medal – third place	1974 Egypt	Team
Arabophone Cup
Gold medal – first place	1992 Syria	Team
Bronze medal – third place	1988 Jordan	Team
Afro-Asian Cup of Nations
Silver medal – second place	1987 Qatar	Team
Silver medal – second place	2007 Japan	Team
African Games
Gold medal – first place	1987 Nairobi	Team
Bronze medal – third place	1973 Lagos	Team
Mediterranean Games
Gold medal – first place	1955 Barcelona	Team
Silver medal – second place	1951 Alexandria	Team
Bronze medal – third place	1983 Casablanca	Team
Arabophone Games
Gold medal – first place	1953 Alexandria	Team
Gold medal – first place	1965 Cairo	Team
Gold medal – first place	1992 Damascus	Team
Gold medal – first place	2007 Cairo	Team
Silver medal – second place	1961 Casablanca	Team

The Egypt national football team, (Note: (Egyptian Arabic: منتخب مصر لكرة القدم)) nicknamed the Pharaohs, represents Egypt in men's international football, and is governed by the Egyptian Football Association (EFA), the governing body of football in Egypt. It has been a member of FIFA since 1923 and was a founding member of the CAF in 1957.

Egypt is the oldest and most successful team in the history of African football, having won the Africa Cup of Nations for a record 7 times and reached the final 10 times. They won the cup 3 times consecutively in 2006, 2008, and 2010 which is a feat unmatched by any other team. Internationally, Egypt is the first country in the world outside Europe and the Americas to participate in the Olympics and the FIFA World Cup. The Egyptians qualified to 13 Olympic Games (an African record), as well as 4 World Cups. Egypt’s first Olympic football participation came in 1920 Antwerp. Their first participation in a World Cup, slated to be in 1930 but the team couldn't travel due to a storm, was in the 1934 edition. Their best result came in 2026, when they reached the Round of 16 after advancing past the group stage for the first time in their history.

Egypt achieved 4th place at 3 Olympics: in 1928 Amsterdam, 1964 Tokyo, and 2024 Paris. The Egyptians have also reached the Quarter-finals of Olympic football at 5 other editions. Moreover, Egypt earned the honor of becoming a bronze medalist at the 2001 FIFA U-20 World Cup in Argentina. In 2010, Egypt reached 9th place in the FIFA world rankings, marking a massively successful era in Egyptian history that saw the Pharaohs win the 2010 Africa Cup of Nations and defeated World Champions Italy in the FIFA Confederations Cup the year before.

== History ==
=== 1920s: International successes before continental domination ===
The inaugural Olympic football tournaments of 1900 and 1904 have seen the participation of European and North American club teams respectively. However, for a long history between 1908 and 1948, the Olympic Games were the world’s most prestigious Association football competition. Hence, Full "National A" teams used to participate in Olympic football tournaments.

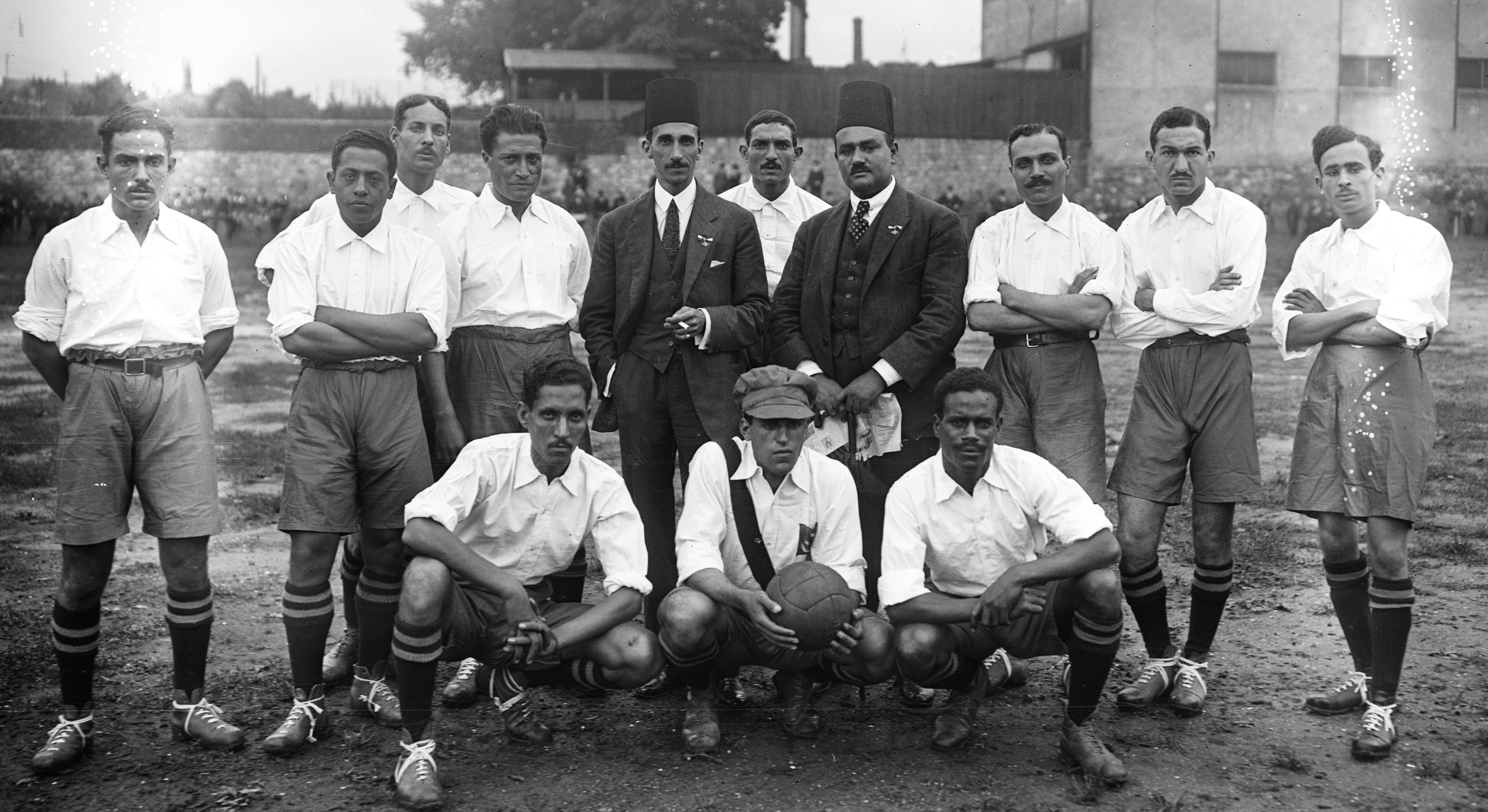
Egypt national team at the 1920 Summer Olympics

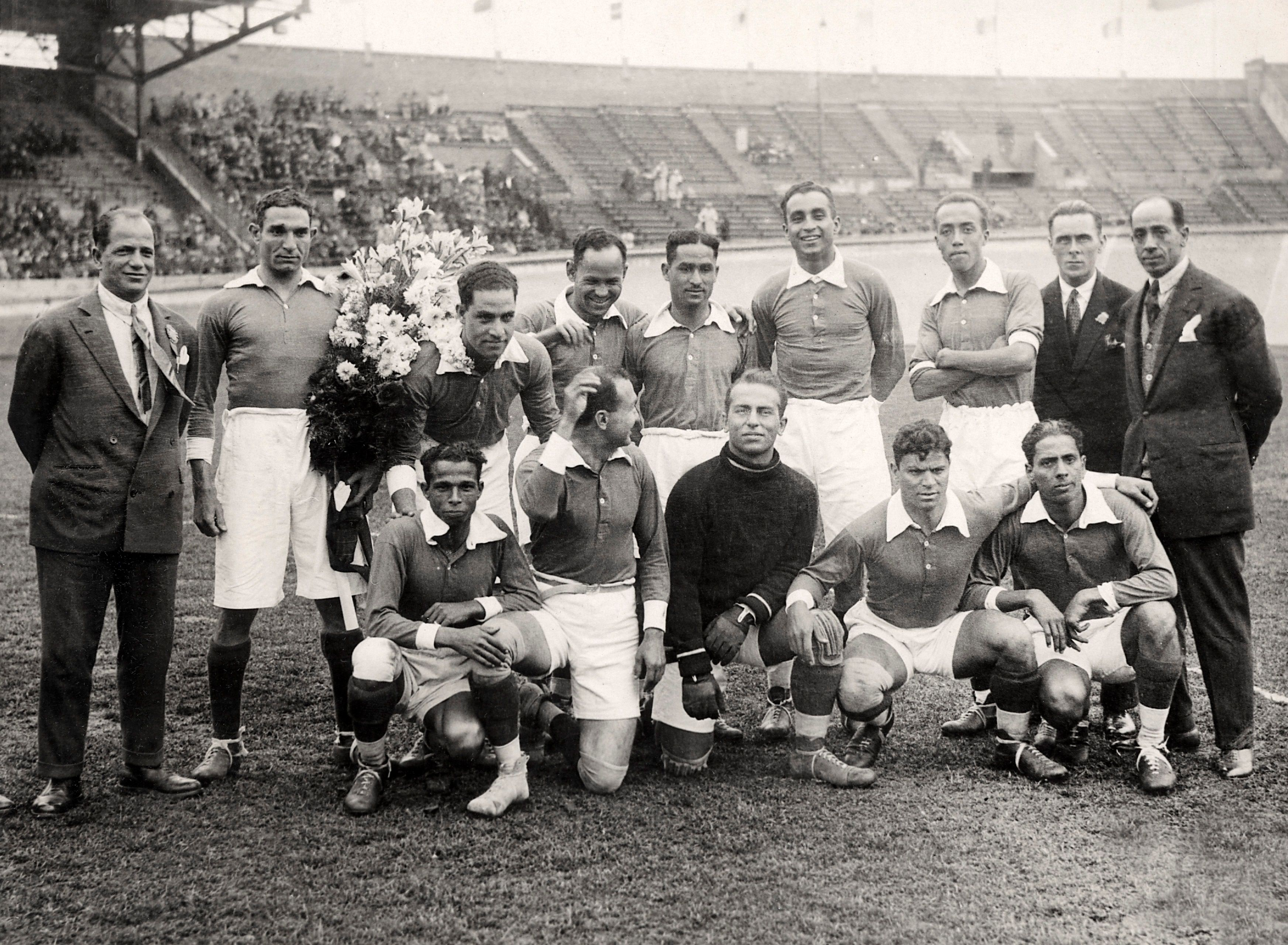
Egypt national team finished in the fourth place at the 1928 Summer Olympics

In light of this, the first Egyptian national football team was constituted in 1920. The Pharaohs became the first African football team to compete in the Summer Olympics in Belgium. Egypt became the first country in the world outside Europe and the Americas to participate in the Olympics. The opening match of their campaign was a close 2–1 loss against the Italians.

Egypt then made its second Olympic appearance at the 1924 Summer Olympics in Paris. In the second round, the Egyptians have astonishingly defeated the global elites Hungary 3–0. But they were ultimately eliminated in the quarter-finals against Sweden.

The Egyptian team made history at the 1928 Summer Olympics in Amsterdam by finishing in 4th place, becoming the first African and non-European team to reach the semi-finals of a major global football tournament.

=== 1934–1952: First World Cup appearance ===
After the creation of the FIFA World Cup in 1930, the FIFA has restricted the participation of elite players in the Olympics to prevent the prestigious Olympic football tournament from eclipsing its newly born international cup.

Between 1952 and 1980, national amateur teams were the type of team allowed by FIFA to participate in the Olympics. However, countries from the Warsaw Pact, mainly Eastern Europe, competed with essentially professional players nominally employed by organs of the state such as armed forces.

While in 1984 and 1988, national teams (with UEFA/CONMEBOL restrictions) were allowed to participate. Then in 1992, the FIFA decided national U23 teams can participate. But since 1996, national U23 team with 3 overage players are allowed to compete at the Olympics.

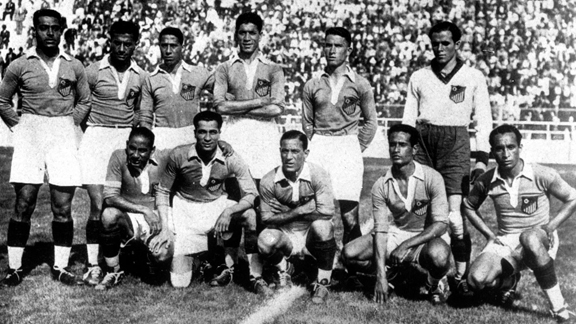
Egypt national football team at the 1934 FIFA World Cup in Italy

Since the inauguration of the FIFA World Cup, Egypt has qualified for the FIFA World Cup 4 times: in 1934, in 1990, in 2018, and in 2026. In the 1934 FIFA World Cup qualification, Egypt became the first African country to qualify for the World Cup, beating Mandatory Palestine in the first leg by a score of 7–1 in Cairo and the second leg by a score of 4–1 in Jerusalem.

In the 1920s and 1930s, the Pharaohs featured iconic pioneers of Egyptian football, including Hussein Hegazi, Mohamed Latif, Mostafa Taha, Mahmoud Mokhtar El-Tetsh, Mustafa Mansour, and Hassan El-Far. They lost to Hungary 4–2 in their first and only match in 1934, with the two Egyptian goals scored by the centre forward Abdulrahman Fawzi.

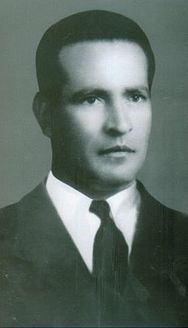
Abdulrahman Fawzi scored two goals in the 1934 FIFA World Cup in Italy.

In the qualification process for the 1938 World Cup. The Egypt national football team competed at the 1936 Summer Olympics in Berlin, officially finishing in equal 9th place. They played only one match, a Round of 16 fixture on 5 August 1936, where they were defeated 3–1 by Austria, with Abdel Karim Sakr scoring Egypt's lone goal. Egypt finished in joint-ninth place overall at the 1948 Summer Olympics in London. They began their campaign with a 7–1 victory over Turkey but were subsequently eliminated in the next round, suffering a 2–1 loss to Denmark in extra time. The Pharaohs featured several notable stars of the era: forwards: Yehia Emam, Hanafy Bastan, El-Sayed El-Dhizui, Abdel-Karim Sakr, Ahmed Mekkawi, and Abdel Aziz El-Hammami. Egypt withdrew. They did not enter 1950 qualification.

=== 1952–1970: First African Cup titles and another Olympic achievement ===
The Egypt national football team competed at the 1952 Summer Olympics in Helsinki, finishing in joint 9th place. The Egyptian squad defeated Chile 5–4 in a thrilling match in Lahti, where El-Sayed El-Dhizui scored a hat-trick, and Ahmed Mekkawi and Sharif El-Far added a goal each. Egypt then was eliminated after losing 3–1 to Germany on 20 July 1952. The Pharaohs won the gold medal at the inaugural 1953 Arab Games hosted in Alexandria. Managed by Abdelrahman Fawzy, the Egyptian squad dominated the tournament, securing victories against Palestine by a score of 8–1, Libya 10–2, and defeating Syria 4–0 in the final. The squad featured key players from the era's top clubs, including Hanafy Bastan, El-Sayed El-Dhizui, Sharif El-Far, and Ad-Diba.

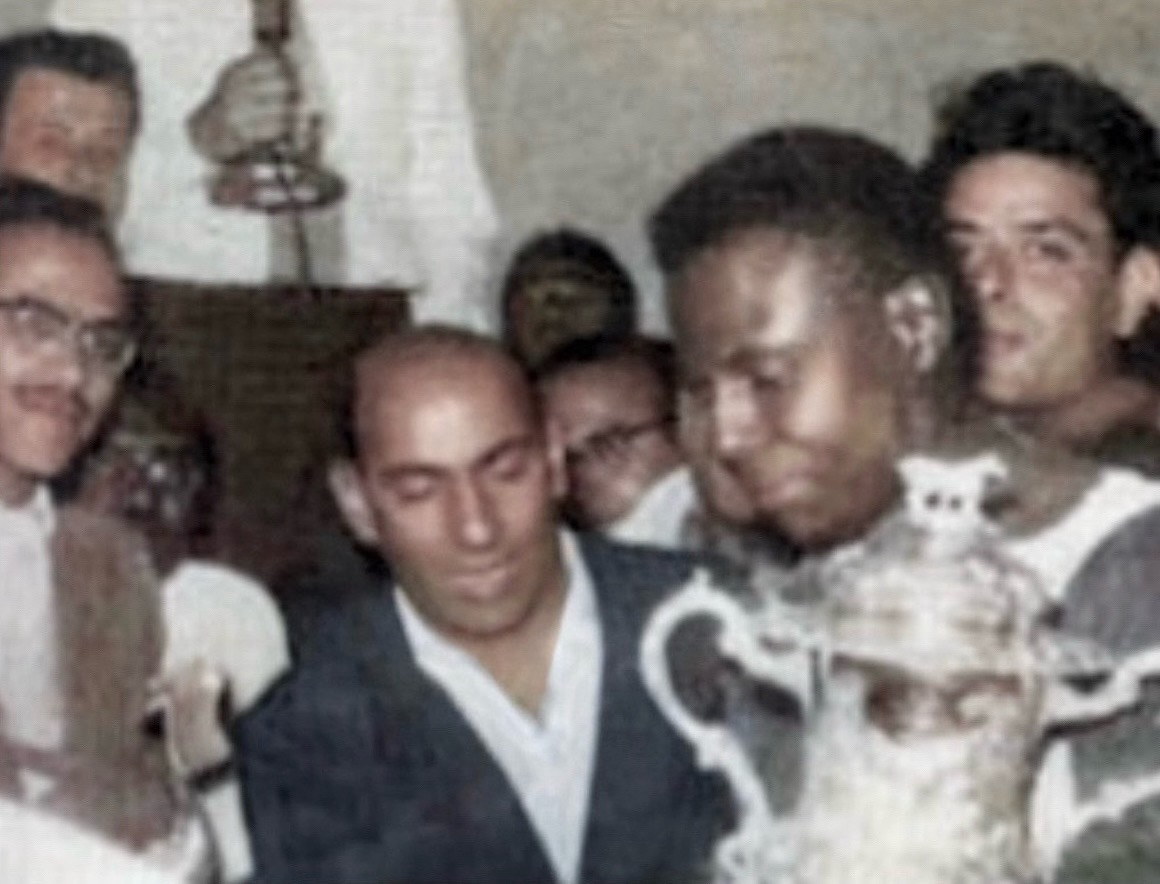
Egypt's captain Hanafy Bastan (right) with the Africa Cup of Nations trophy in 1957

In 1954 qualifying, they faced Italy but failed to qualify. The Egyptian team won the gold medal at the 1955 Mediterranean Games held in Barcelona. This marked Egypt's first-ever tournament championship in Mediterranean Games football. The squad was managed and represented by a golden generation of Egyptian football, featuring key players such as defender Hanafy Bastan, Essam Baheeg, and Raafat Attia. In 1957, The Pharaohs first participated in the first Africa Cup of Nations tournament in 1957. In their first game, a semi-final, they faced Sudan, winning 2–1; Egypt won 4–0 in the final.

Egypt withdrew for the 1958 World Cup due to the fact that they had to play Israel in qualification, who was a political enemy (see Egypt–Israel relations article). One year later, Egypt won the AFCON tournament for the second time in a row. There were only three teams in that tournament, Ethiopia, Sudan, and Egypt, who were undefeated. Between 1958 and 1961, the country had a political union with Syria and went under the name of United Arab Republic (UAR), though the Egyptian team's records are attributed to Egypt only by FIFA as it was represented by Egyptian footballers.

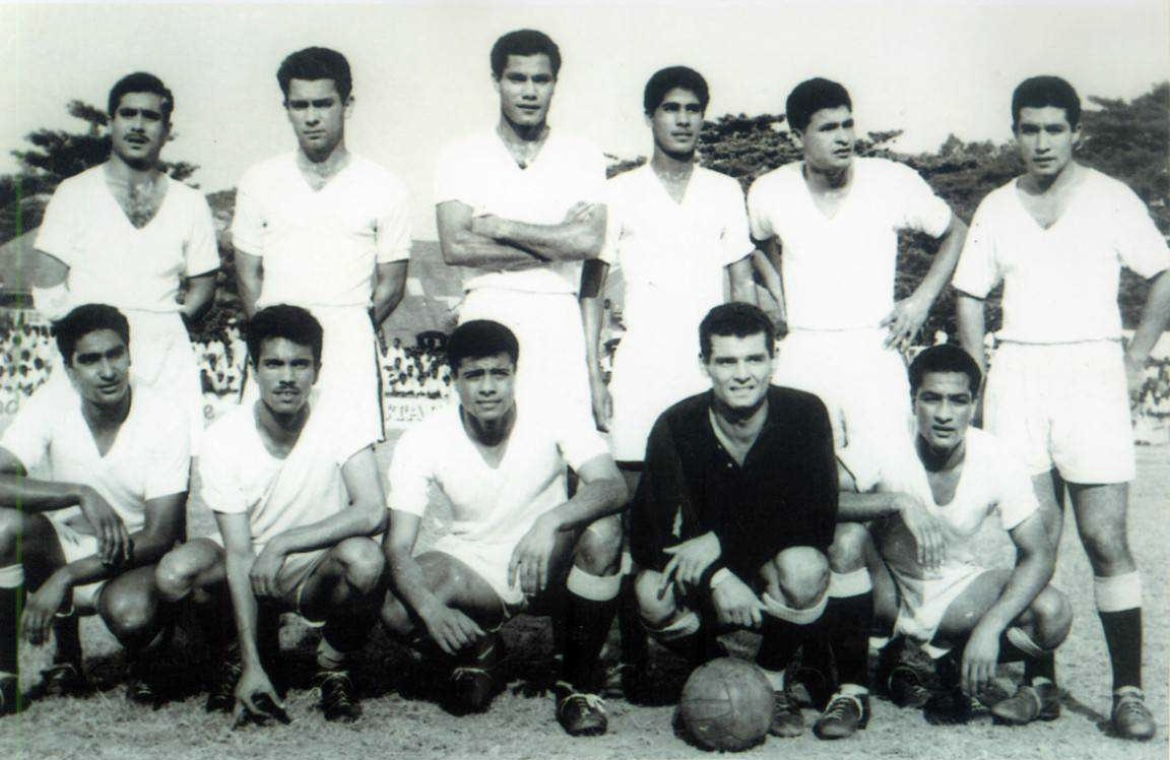
Egyptian squad in 1959

The Egyptian squad competed at the 1960 Summer Olympics in Rome under the name UAR. They finished third in Group C, recording one win, one draw, and one loss to be eliminated in the preliminary round. Additionally, they were tied in 13th place with Chinese Taipei, Tunisia, and India. (see Rome 1960 Olympics Football Results) In the 1962 Africa Cup of Nations, Egypt lost 4-2 to Ethiopia, marking the first time to get eliminated from the Africa Cup of Nations. The Pharaohs withdrew from the 1962, 1966 and 1970 World Cup tournaments afterwards.

Egypt's fourth AFCON appearance came in 1963 in Ghana. Egypt was placed in Group B with Sudan and Nigeria, defeating Nigeria 6–3, but drawing 2–2 against Sudan. Despite being undefeated in the group stage, they were ranked second behind Sudan by goal difference (see African Nations Cup 1963). Egypt, as runners-up in Group B, participated in the third-place match, playing against Ethiopia, winning 3–0.

The Pharaohs had again achieved their best-ever Olympic result at the 1964 Summer Olympics in Tokyo by finishing in 4th place (see Tokyo 1964 Olympics Football Results). This remains tied with their 1928 performance as the highest placement by an African nation at the time. Egypt was placed in Group C alongside Brazil, Czechoslovakia, and South Korea. They advanced to the quarterfinals by securing 2nd place in their group. Notably, Egypt held Brazil to a 1–1 draw and defeated South Korea 10–0. In the knockout Stage, Egypt defeated Ghana 5–1 in the quarterfinals. They were defeated against Hungary in the semifinals and subsequently lost the bronze medal match to the United Team of Germany.

In 1965, Egypt won the football gold medal at the 1965 Arab Games in Cairo. The Egyptian squad featured notable players, including Abdel Karim El-Gohary, Hassan El-Shazly, Moustafa Reyadh, Mahmoud Abou-Regaila, and Taha Ismail. In the group stage, Egypt was drawn with Palestine, Iraq Lebanon, and South Yemen (also called Aden after their capital city). Their first match against Iraq was initially postponed due to overcrowding concerns, but in the end, Egypt went to win that match 1–0. They also thrashed Aden 14–0, beat Lebanon 3–0, and won against Palestine 2–1 to top the group with 8 points across their four matches.

In the semifinals, Egypt earned another heavy win, beating Libya 8–1. In the final, they ended their campaign with a 2–0 win against Sudan, winning the tournament.

For the 1965 Africa Cup of Nations, Egypt qualified for the tournament, but withdrew because of their diplomatic relationship with hosts Tunisia. They also withdrew in 1968.

=== 1970s ===
In the 1970 Africa Cup of Nations, hosted again in Sudan, Egypt were in Group B along with Ghana, Guinea, and the Democratic Republic of the Congo, known as Congo-Kinshasa at the time. In their opening match, Egypt defeated Guinea 4–1 and drew Ghana 1–1, before defeating Congo-Kinshasa 1–0. Egypt topped the group, thus advancing to the next round, where they faced Sudan. Egypt eventually lost their first game in the AFCON by a score of 2–1, then in the third place match, won against Ivory Coast 3–1.

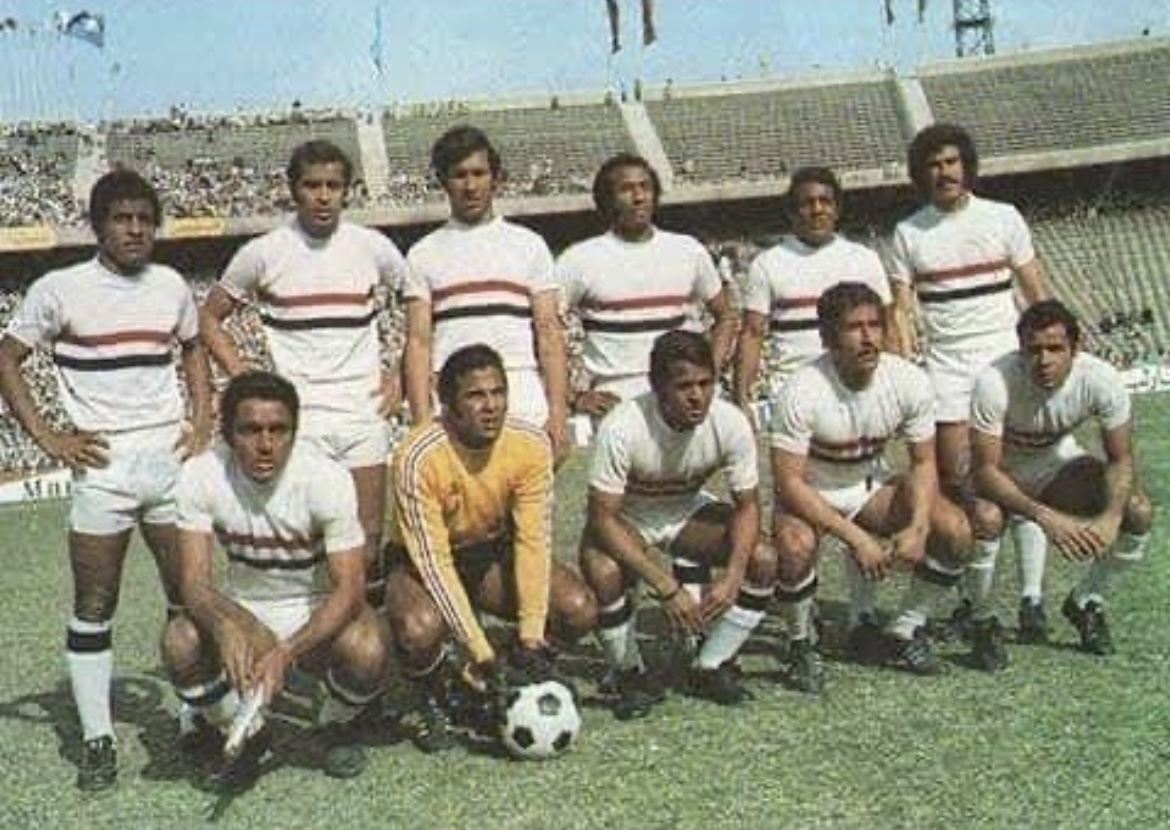
Egyptian team at the 1974 African Cup of Nations

The Pharaohs won the inaugural 1972 Arab Cup of Nations hosted in Baghdad. They defeated the host country, Iraq, 3–1 in the final, with goals scored by Hassan El-Shazly and two goals from Abdel Aziz Abdel Shafi. In the same year, Egypt failed to qualify for the AFCON for the first time in 1972 after being eliminated by Morocco by an aggregate score of 5–3.

The Pharaohs won the Bronze medal at the 1973 All-Africa Games. The next year, Egypt entered 1974 World Cup qualification, but did not qualify. However, Egypt returned for 1974, hosting the event, eventually finishing in third place. Egypt won the 1975 Arab Cup of Nations, which was the third and final edition of the tournament. Hosted in Tunisia, the Egyptian team claimed their second title by defeating Iraq 1–0 after extra time in the final. Under the captaincy of Taha Basry and with a squad featuring Hassan Shehata, who was the tournament's top goal scorer. Egypt dominated the tournament by defeating South Yemen 5–0 and Saudi Arabia 2–1. They advanced to the final by defeating Sudan 3–1, and securing the title on with a 1–0 victory over Iraq, with the winning goal scored by Mahmoud Abdel Dayem. One year later, in Ethiopia, they were in Group A with the hosts, Guinea, and Uganda. Egypt defeated Uganda 2–1, but drew against Uganda and Ethiopia. Egypt advanced to the final round, and lost all matches. This is the first Africa Cup of Nations tournament that Egypt lost three consecutive games. They then failed to qualify for 1978.

=== 1980–2006: African titles and World Cup appearance ===
Egypt reappeared for the 1980 African Cup of Nations, defeating Ivory Coast and Tanzania, but losing to hosts Nigeria 1–0. They progressed to the semi-finals to face Algeria, who defeated the Egyptians on penalties. Four years later, Egypt defeated Cameroon and Ivory Coast, and drew Togo, eventually finishing fourth behind Algeria.

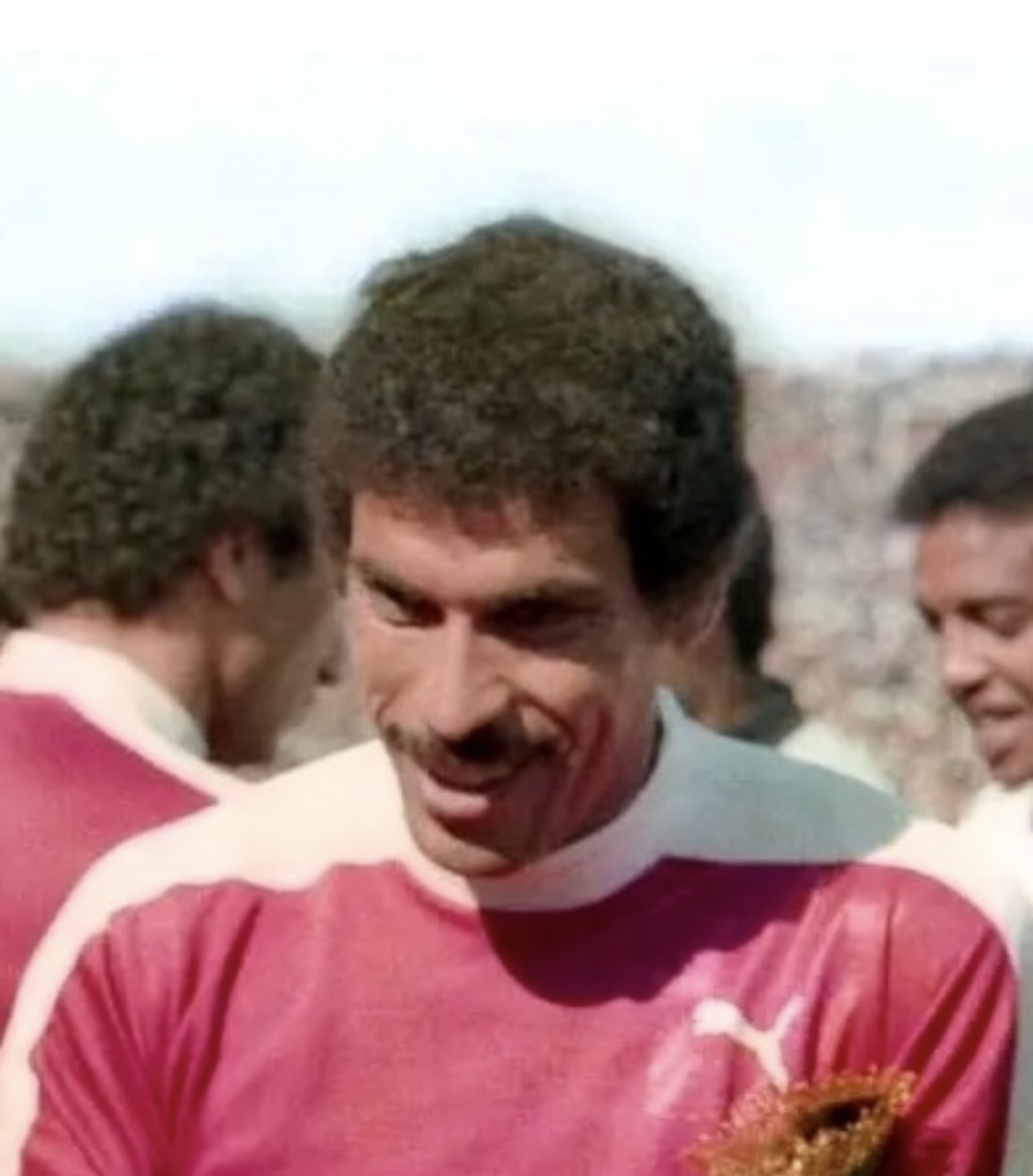
Egypt's captain Hassan Shehata at the 1982 World Cup qualifier against Morocco in Casablanca, April 1981

Egypt's 1982 World Cup qualifying campaign ended in the third round after initially advancing past the first and the second rounds, where they lost to Morocco 1–0 on aggregate over two legs. In 1983, Egypt won the Bronze Medal at the 1983 Medditeranean Games. In 1984, the Egyptian national football team reached the quarter-finals of the 1984 Summer Olympics in Los Angeles, and finished in fourth place at the 1984 Africa Cup of Nations hosted by Ivory Coast.

In 1986, Egypt hosted; they lost to Senegal 1–0. However, Egypt went on to win their two remaining games in the group stage, 2–0 against the Ivory Coast and Mozambique. Egypt advanced to the final for the first time since 1962, eventually winning.

The Pharaohs won their first Gold medal at the 1987 All-Africa Games. In 1989, Egypt qualified for the 1990 AFCON, losing all group stage matches, thus making Egypt fail to obtain at least one point for the first time in the Africa Cup of Nations, while appearing in the World Cup that same year. After beating Algeria 1–0 in the playoffs, they were drawn in Group F, with Ireland, England and the Netherlands. They scored only one goal in the tournament; a 1–1 draw with UEFA Euro 1988 champions Netherlands gave the Egyptians their first point in the World Cup. This was followed by a draw against Ireland and a 0–1 loss to England.

The team lost both of their matches in the 1992 AFCON. In the 1994 Africa Cup of Nations in Tunisia, Egypt defeated Gabon 4–0 and drew Nigeria 0–0. They lost to Mali 1–0 in the quarterfinals. They secured their second Gold Medal at the 1995 All-Africa Games. At the 1996 Africa Cup of Nations hosted in South Africa, they reached the quarter-finals. The Pharaohs then secured their fourth title at the 1998 Africa Cup of Nations, defeating South Africa in the final.

The Egyptian team entered the 2000 Africa Cup of Nations as defending champions, reaching the quarter-finals, before being eliminated by a 1-0 defeat to Tunisia. The tournament took place in Ghana and Nigeria, where Egypt was eliminated from the knockout stage by a 22nd-minute penalty kick in the quarter-final. The Egyptian team reached the quarter-finals of the 2002 Africa Cup of Nations hosted in Mali. Managed by the legendary Mahmoud El-Gohary, the squad featured a mix of domestic stars and emerging talents, including the likes of Essam El Hadary, Hany Ramzy, Hazem Emam, and Mido. Egypt qualified for the 2004 AFCON in Tunisia, and were placed in Group C with Algeria, Zimbabwe, and Cameroon. With a 2–1 win against Zimbabwe, the team then lost 2–1 to Algeria, and drew 0–0 against Cameroon, failing to qualify for the quarter-finals due to Algeria scoring more goals than Egypt in the group stage, after being equal on points and goal difference.

=== 2006–2010: Modern golden generation ===
The Egyptian national football team experienced its most dominant historical era between 2006 and 2010, winning an unprecedented 3 consecutive Africa Cup of Nations (AFCON) titles.

Egypt's starting line-up against Ivory Coast at the 2006 Africa Cup of Nations final

Managed by Hassan Shehata, this "Golden Generation" relied on a brilliant core of domestic stars, and won the 2006 Africa Cup of Nations was hosted in Egypt; the hosts were in Group A with Libya, Morocco, and the Ivory Coast. After accumulating seven points in the group stage, the Pharaohs would eventually win the tournament on penalties. Followed by the 2008 Africa Cup of Nations, in which Egypt secured its sixth title by defeating Cameroon 1-0 in the final. In the 2010 Africa Cup of Nations, the Pharaohs became the first and only African nation to win three consecutive tournaments, sealing their seventh overall AFCON title by beating Ghana 1-0 in the final.

=== 2010–2018: Post-golden generation ===
In light of political turmoil, they would then fail to qualify for the next 3 AFCONs (before this Egypt was the sole African country to never miss an African Cup of Nations). Egypt qualified for the 2017 tournament, drawing against Mali in their first match in Group D. Successive 1–0 wins against Uganda and Ghana saw the Pharaohs qualify to the quarter-finals as group winners. Egypt faced Morocco at the quarter-final stage, and defeated them for the first time in 31 years to set up a semi-final clash with Burkina Faso. Mohamed Salah's goal against the Stallions was canceled out by an Aristide Bancé strike; however, veteran goalkeeper Essam El Hadary saved two spot-kicks in the penalty shootout to earn a spot in the final for Egypt. Egypt then faced Cameroon, and lost the final for the second time.

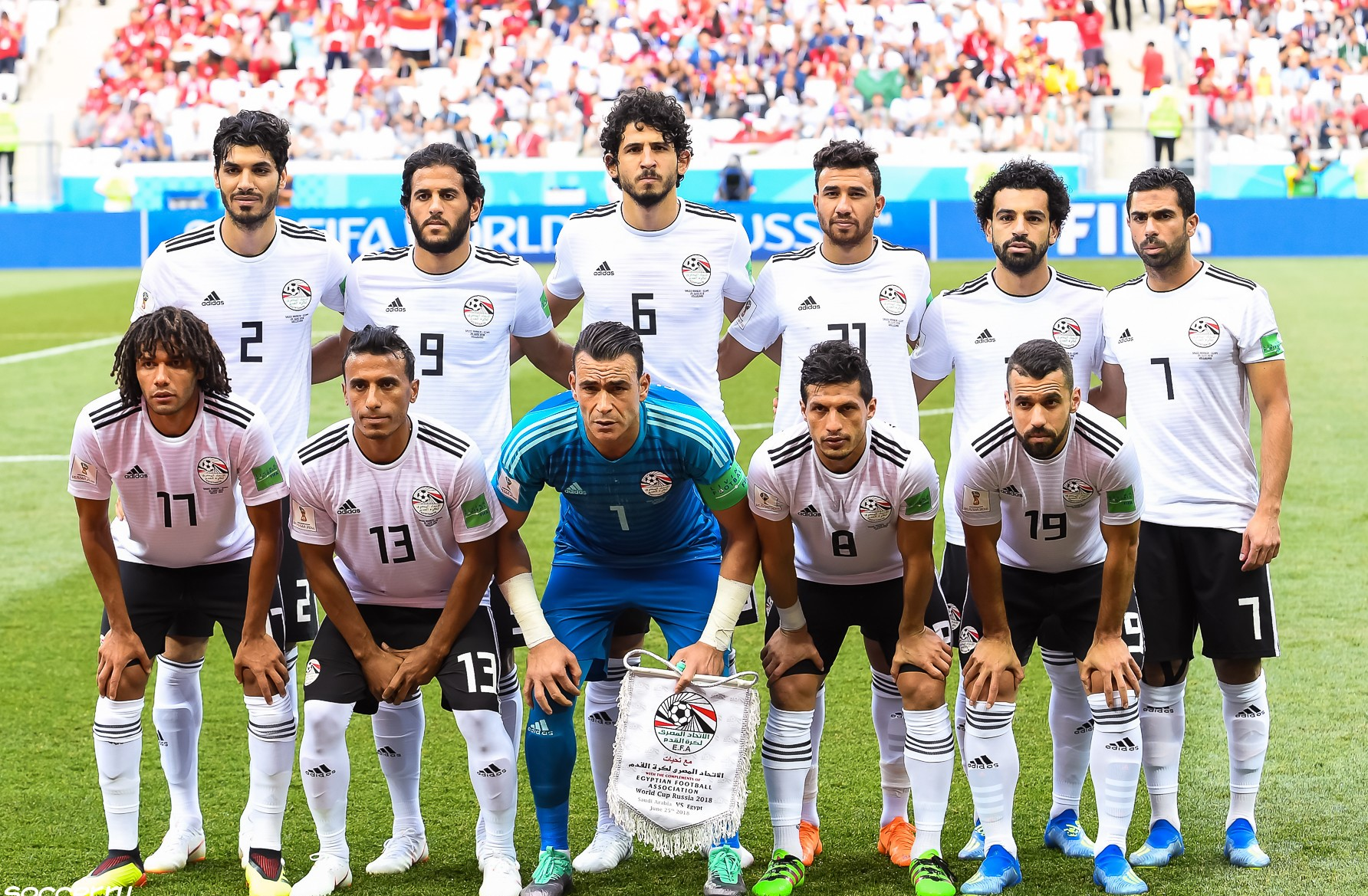
Egypt national team at the 2018 FIFA World Cup in Russia

On 8 October 2017, Egypt qualified for the 2018 World Cup after topping Group E over Uganda, Ghana and Congo. In the World Cup, Egypt was drawn with Saudi Arabia, Uruguay and the hosts, Russia in Group A. They started their first game against Uruguay, without Salah, who was injured in the UEFA Champions League final. Egypt lost 1–0, and goalkeeper Mohamed El Shenawy was voted man of the match. He refused the reward due to sponsorship by Budweiser. Salah returned to the starting lineup when Egypt faced hosts Russia. After being down 3–0, Salah scored Egypt's first World Cup goal in 28 years. Egypt's third and final match was a Red Sea derby against Saudi Arabia, also out of contention after two losses. Essam El Hadary became the oldest player in the World Cup at 45 years and 161 days. Despite Salah scoring a goal, the Egyptians lost 2–1.

Héctor Cúper, who was criticized due to his defensive strategies against Saudi Arabia, was sacked. The Egyptian Football Association was also criticised due to having its base in Chechnya, far from where Egypt's matches were played. The Egyptian media and the public heavily criticized EFA's management of the team.

=== 2018–present: World Cup reappearance ===
In the 2019 Africa Cup of Nations, hosts Egypt were knocked out by South Africa in the round of 16, despite three wins in the group stage. In the 2021 Africa Cup, Egypt advanced to the final after dire performances in the group stage and beating Ivory Coast on penalties after a 0–0 draw. Egypt then beat Cameroon 3–1 on penalties after a scoreless draw, to reach their 10th final, beating Ghana's record of final appearances. Egypt suffered their first of two losses to Senegal in 2022, both on penalties (in the AFCON final and in World Cup qualifying), with both winning penalties scored by Sadio Mané.

Egypt's starting lineup against Argentina at the 2026 FIFA World Cup

The Pharaohs would then qualify for the 2026 World Cup for their 4th appearance. During the 2026 World Cup group stage, Egypt's match against Iran in Seattle was designated by the local host-city

organisers as the tournament's official "Pride Match". After drawing against Belgium in their first match due to an own goal by Mohamed Hany, Egypt won their first-ever World Cup match against New Zealand in the 2026 FIFA World Cup. Egypt advancing to the knockout stage, in the round of 32, defeated Australia in penalties. In round of 16 against Argentina, despite scoring 2 goals, conceded 3 goals in the last 10 minutes of the match and were eliminated from the World Cup.

In November 2026, Hossam Hassan was replaced by Ali Maher as new head coach.

== Team image ==
=== Kits and crest ===
Egypt's home kit is traditionally a red jersey, white shorts, and black socks, whilst their current away kit is predominantly white, having been green traditionally. Egypt's jersey is emblazoned with the crest of the Egyptian Football Association. The color of the home jersey used to be green before the early 1950s, the colors of Egypt's old flag.

=== Kit suppliers ===
Kit provider	Period
(Germany) Adidas	1990–1995
(Egypt) Venecia	1995–1998
(Germany) Puma	1999–2004
(Germany) Adidas	2004–2006
(Germany) Puma	2006–2012
(Germany) Adidas	2012–2018
(Germany) Puma	2019–present

=== Home stadium ===
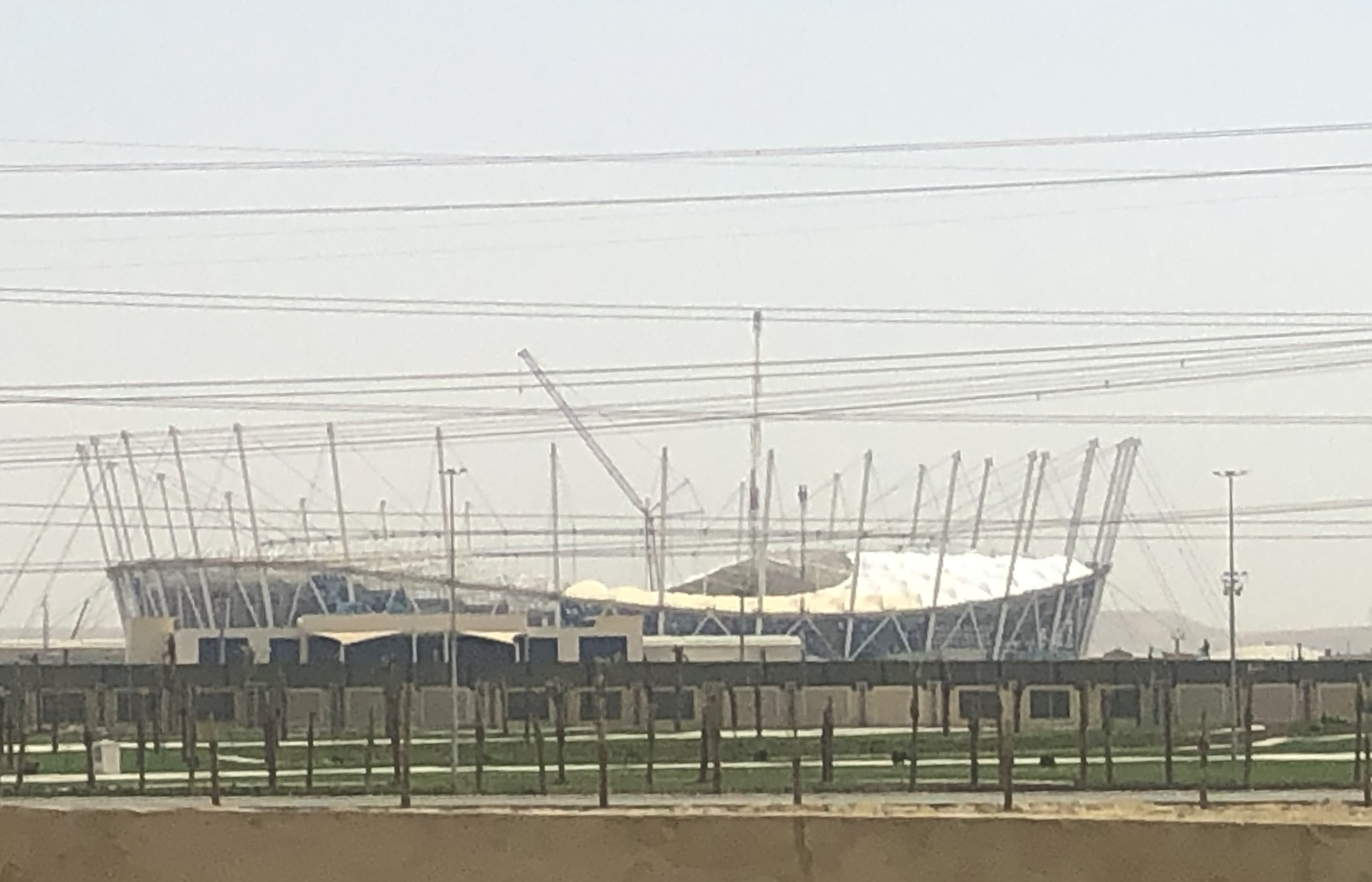
Misr Stadium

For the first 40 years of their existence, Egypt played their home matches all around the country, until the opening of the Cairo Stadium in Cairo in 1960. The stadium became Egypt's permanent home stadium during the 1960s. Several matches were also played on the grounds of the 86,000 seated Borg El Arab Stadium in Alexandria. In 2024, the Misr Stadium in Egypt's proposed new capital was opened, and started to host several matches for the national team, besides the Cairo Stadium.

== Results and fixtures ==
The following is a list of match results in the last 12 months, as well as any future matches that have been scheduled.

Win Draw Loss Fixture

=== 2025 ===
14 November 2025 Al Ain International Cup semi-final	Uzbekistan	2–0	Egypt	Al Ain, United Arab Emirates
20:00 UTC+4	Urunov 4', 43'	Report		Stadium: Hazza bin Zayed Stadium; Attendance: 6,200; Referee: Ahmed Eisa Mohamed Darwish (United Arab Emirates)

17 November 2025 Al Ain International Cup third place match	Cape Verde	1–1 (0–2 p)	Egypt	Al Ain, United Arab Emirates
17:00	Rodrigues 7' (pen.)	Report	Marmoush 57'	Stadium: Hazza bin Zayed Stadium; Attendance: 2,300; Referee: Rawdha Al Mansoori (United Arab Emirates)
	Penalties
	Diney (penalty missed); Monteiro (penalty missed); Pina (penalty missed); Mendes (penalty missed)		(penalty missed) Marmoush; (penalty scored) Abdelmaguid; (penalty scored) Hamdy; (penalty missed) Faisal

2 December 2025 FIFA Arab Cup Group C	Egypt	1–1	Kuwait	Lusail, Qatar
17:30 UTC+3	Afsha 88' (pen.)	Report	Al Hajeri 64'	Stadium: Lusail Stadium; Attendance: 24,632; Referee: Espen Eskås (Norway)

6 December 2025 FIFA Arab Cup Group C	United Arab Emirates	1–1	Egypt	Lusail, Qatar
21:30 UTC+3	Caio 60'	Report	Hamdy 85'	Stadium: Lusail Stadium; Attendance: 36,299; Referee: Glenn Nyberg (Sweden)

9 December 2025 FIFA Arab Cup Group C	Egypt	0–3	Jordan	Al Khor, Qatar
17:30 UTC+3		Report	Abu Hashish 19'; Abu Zrayq 41'; Olwan 90+2' (pen.)	Stadium: Al Bayt Stadium; Attendance: 55,658; Referee: Ismail Elfath (United States)

16 December Friendly	Egypt	2–1	Nigeria	Cairo, Egypt
20:00 UTC+2	Saber 28'; M. Mohamed 53'	Report	Awaziem 45+3'	Stadium: Cairo International Stadium; Referee: Mahmoud Nagy (Egypt)

22 December 2025 AFCON Group B	Egypt	2–1	Zimbabwe	Agadir, Morocco
21:00 UTC+1	Marmoush 64'; Salah 90+1'	Report	Dube 20'	Stadium: Adrar Stadium; Attendance: 28,199; Referee: Issa Sy (Senegal)

26 December 2025 AFCON Group B	Egypt	1–0	South Africa	Agadir, Morocco
16:00 UTC+1	Salah 45' (pen.)	Report		Stadium: Adrar Stadium; Attendance: 40,219; Referee: Pacifique Ndabihawenimana (Burundi)

29 December 2025 AFCON Group B	Angola	0–0	Egypt	Agadir, Morocco
17:00 UTC+1		Report		Stadium: Adrar Stadium; Attendance: 16,090; Referee: Clement Franklin Kpan (Ivory Coast)

=== 2026 ===
5 January 2025 AFCON Round of 16	Egypt	3–1 (a.e.t.)	Benin	Agadir, Morocco
17:00 UTC+1	Attia 69'; Ibrahim 97'; Salah 120+4'	Report	Dossou 83'	Stadium: Adrar Stadium; Attendance: 20,191; Referee: Pierre Atcho (Gabon)

10 January 2025 AFCON Quarter-finals	Egypt	3–2	Ivory Coast	Agadir, Morocco
20:00 UTC+1	Marmoush 4'; Rabia 32'; Salah 52'	Report	Abou El Fotouh 40' (o.g.); Doué 73'	Stadium: Adrar Stadium; Attendance: 31,213; Referee: Mustapha Ghorbal (Algeria)

14 January 2025 AFCON Semi-finals	Senegal	1–0	Egypt	Tangier, Morocco
18:00 UTC+1	Mané 78'	Report		Stadium: Tangier Grand Stadium; Attendance: 52,079; Referee: Pierre Atcho (Gabon)

17 January 2025 AFCON Third-place match	Egypt	0–0 (2–4 p)	Nigeria	Casablanca, Morocco
17:00 UTC+1		Report		Stadium: Mohammed V Stadium; Attendance: 38,113; Referee: Jalal Jayed (Morocco)
	Penalties
	Salah (penalty missed); Marmoush (penalty missed); Rabia (penalty scored); Saber (penalty scored)		(penalty missed) Dele-Bashiru; (penalty scored) Adams; (penalty scored) Simon; (penalty scored) Iwobi; (penalty scored) Lookman

27 March Friendly	Saudi Arabia	0–4	Egypt	Jeddah, Saudi Arabia (Note: The Saudi Arabia v Egypt match, originally scheduled to be played at the Ahmad bin Ali Stadium, Al Rayyan, Qatar, was relocated to Saudi Arabia due to the 2026 Iran war.)
20:30 UTC+3		Report	Issa 4'; Trézéguet 16'; Zizo 44'; Marmoush 56'	Stadium: King Abdullah Sports City; Attendance: 25,000; Referee: Abdulla Ali Al Athba (Qatar)

31 March Friendly	Spain	0–0	Egypt	Cornellà de Llobregat, Spain (Note: The Egypt v Spain match, originally scheduled to be played at the Lusail Stadium, Lusail, Qatar, was relocated to Spain due to the 2026 Iran war.)
21:00 UTC+2		Report		Stadium: RCDE Stadium; Attendance: 35,895; Referee: Georgi Kabakov (Bulgaria)

28 May Friendly	Egypt	1–0	Russia	Cairo, Egypt
21:00 UTC+3	Ziko 65'	Report		Stadium: Cairo International Stadium; Attendance: 35,000; Referee: Lahlou Benbraham (Algeria)

6 June Friendly	Brazil	2–1	Egypt	Cleveland, Ohio, United States
18:00 UTC−4	Bruno Guimarães 7'; Endrick 52'	Report	Ziko 11'	Stadium: Huntington Bank Field; Attendance: 64,311; Referee: Adonai Escobedo (Mexico)

15 June 2026 FIFA World Cup Group G	Belgium	1–1	Egypt	Seattle, Washington, United States
12:00 UTC−7	Hany 66' (o.g.)	Report	Ashour 19'	Stadium: Lumen Field; Attendance: 66,775; Referee: Ramon Abatti (Brazil)

21 June 2026 FIFA World Cup Group G	New Zealand	1–3	Egypt	Vancouver, Canada
18:00 UTC−7	Surman 15'	Report	Ziko 58'; Salah 67'; Trézéguet 82'	Stadium: BC Place; Attendance: 52,497; Referee: Omar Al Ali (United Arab Emirates)

26 June 2026 FIFA World Cup Group G	Egypt	1–1	Iran	Seattle, Washington, United States
20:00 UTC−7	Saber 5'	Report	Rezaeian 14'	Stadium: Lumen Field; Attendance: 66,925; Referee: Szymon Marciniak (Poland)

3 July 2026 FIFA World Cup Round of 32	Australia	1–1 (a.e.t.) (2–4 p)	Egypt	Arlington, Texas, United States
13:00 UTC−5	Hany 55' (o.g.)	Report	Ashour 13'	Stadium: AT&T Stadium; Attendance: 70,224; Referee: Gustavo Tejera (Uruguay)
	Penalties
	Souttar (penalty missed); Irvine (penalty scored); Mabil (penalty scored); Herrington (penalty missed)		(penalty scored) Saber; (penalty scored) Rabia; (penalty scored) Salah; (penalty scored) Abdelmaguid

7 July 2026 FIFA World Cup Round of 16	Argentina	3–2	Egypt	Atlanta, Georgia, United States
12:00 UTC−4	Romero 79'; Messi 83'; Fernández 90+2'	Report	Ibrahim 15'; Ziko 67'	Stadium: Mercedes-Benz Stadium; Attendance: 68,239; Referee: François Letexier (France)

25 September 2027 AFCON qualification	Egypt	0–0	Angola	Cairo, Egypt
22:00 UTC+3		Report		Stadium: Cairo International Stadium; Referee: Peter Waweru (Kenya)

29 September 2027 AFCON qualification	South Sudan	0–5	Egypt	Juba, South Sudan
15:00 UTC+2		Report	Ziko 36'; Marmoush 49', 83'; I.Adel 75'; H.Abdelkarim 90+2'	Stadium: Juba Stadium; Referee: Ahmad Imtehaz Heeralall (Mauritius)

4 October Friendly	Egypt	0–1	South Africa	Cairo, Egypt
21:00 UTC+3		Report	Dithejane 51'	Stadium: Cairo International Stadium; Referee: Nabil Boukhalfa (Algeria

11 November 2027 AFCON qualification	Egypt	5–0	Malawi	Cairo, Egypt
21:00 UTC+3	Maher 6'; Marmoush 10'; Hany 39'; Salah 84', 90+5' (pen.)	Report		Stadium: Cairo International Stadium; Referee: Abdelaziz Mohamed Bouh (Mauritania)

15 November 2027 AFCON qualification	Malawi	0–0	Egypt	Lilongwe, Malawi
14:00 UTC+2		Report		Stadium: Bingu National Stadium; Referee: Lucky Razake Kasalirwe (Uganda)

=== 2027 ===
24 March 2027 AFCON qualification	Angola	v	Egypt	TBD, Angola
TBD				Stadium: TBD

28 March 2027 AFCON qualification	Egypt	v	South Sudan	TBD, Egypt
TBD				Stadium: TBD

== Coaching staff ==
Role	Name
Head coach	(Egypt) Ali Maher
Assistant coach	(Egypt) Mohamed Abdel Wahed
Technical director	(Egypt) Alaa Nabil
Director of the team	Vacant
General coach	(Egypt) Tarek Soliman
Goalkeeper coach	(Egypt) Saafan El-Sagheer
Load trainer	(Brazil) Manuel Barrionuevo
Performance analyst	(Egypt) Mahmoud Seleem

=== Coaching history ===
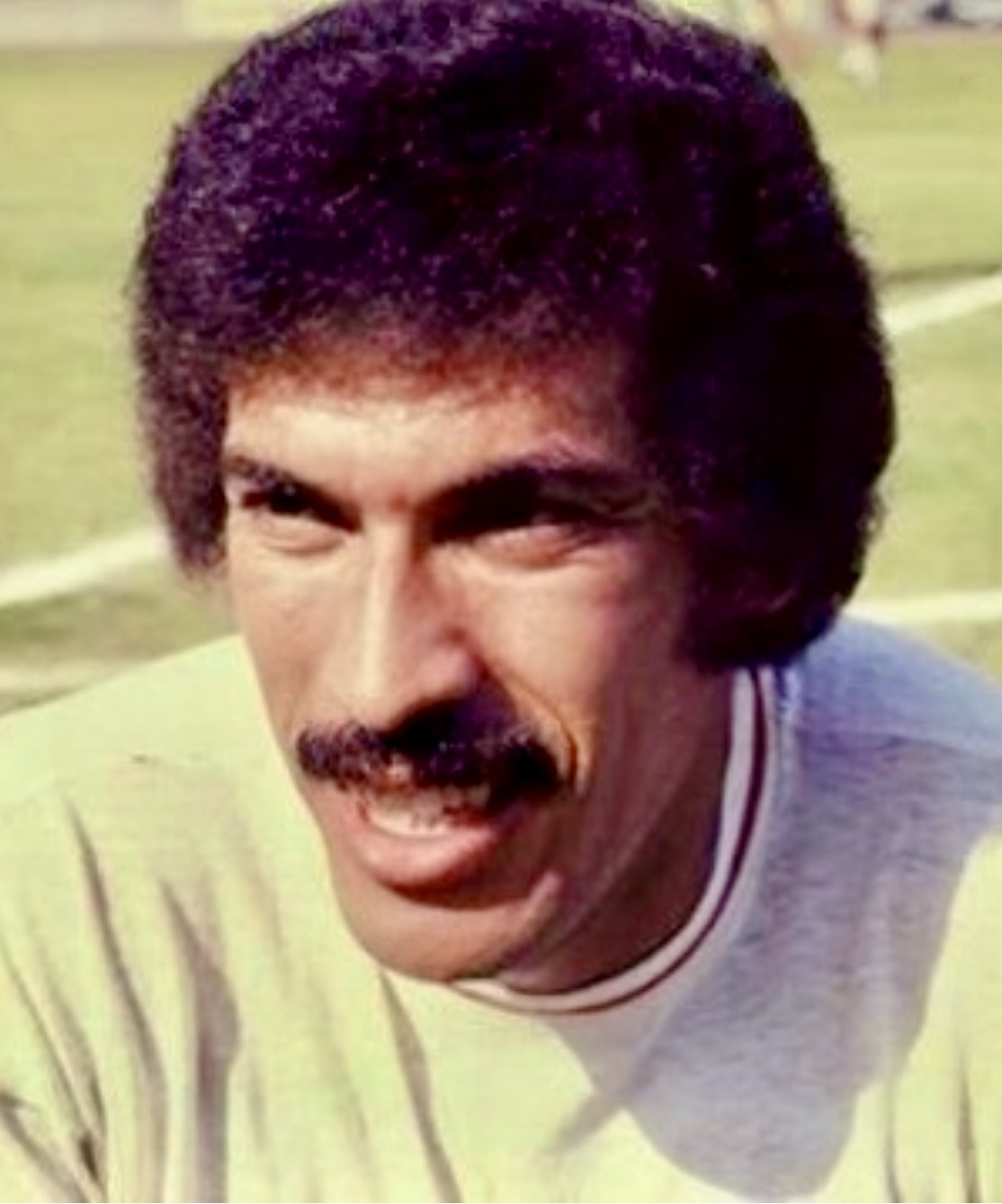
Hassan Shehata

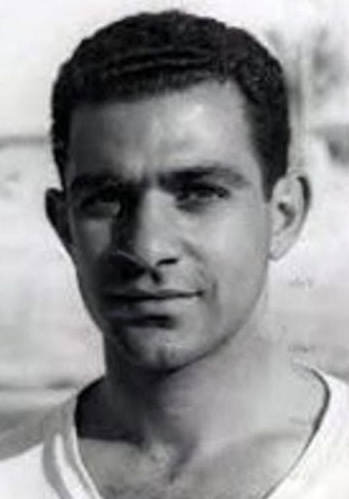
Mahmoud El Gohary

1. (Egypt) Hussein Hegazi (1920–1924)
2. (Romania) Valerian Bezveconnîi (1928)
3. (Scotland) James McCrae (1934–1936)
4. (Egypt) Mahmoud Badr El-Din (1936)
5. (Egypt) Tewfik Abdullah (1940–1944)
6. (England) Eric Keen (1947–1948)
7. (England) Edward Jones (1949–1952)
8. (Egypt) National Committee (Note: A committee of six former Egypt internationals.) (1953–1954)
9. (Socialist Federal Republic of Yugoslavia) Ljubiša Broćić (1954–1955)
10. (Egypt) Mourad Fahmy (1955–1957)
11. (United Arab Republic) Mohamed El-Guindi and Hanafy Bastan (1958, 1962)
12. (Hungary) Pál Titkos (1959–1961)
13. (United Arab Republic) Fouad Ahmed Sedki (1963)
14. (Socialist Federal Republic of Yugoslavia) Branko Horvatek (1963–1964)
15. (Socialist Federal Republic of Yugoslavia) Andrija Pflander (1964–1965)
16. (Socialist Federal Republic of Yugoslavia) Dimitri Tadić (1965)
17. (Socialist Federal Republic of Yugoslavia) Andrija Kovač (1965)
18. (Hungary) Sándor Kapocsi (1965–1967)
19. (United Arab Republic) Saleh El Wahsh and Kamal El Sabagh (1968–1970)
20. (West Germany) Dettmar Cramer (1971–1974)
21. (West Germany) Burkhard Pape (1975–1977)
22. (Socialist Federal Republic of Yugoslavia) Dušan Nenković (1977–1978)
23. (Egypt) Taha Ismail (1978, 1994)
24. (Hungary) Bundzsák Dezso (1979)
25. (Egypt) Fouad Sedki (1980)
26. (Egypt) Abdel Monem El Hajj (1980)
27. (Egypt) Hamada El Sharqawy (1980)
28. (West Germany) Karl-Heinz Heddergott (1982–1984)
29. (Egypt) Saleh El Wahsh (1984)
30. (England) Mike Smith (1985–1988)
31. (Egypt) Mahmoud El Gohary (1988–1990, 1992, 1997–1999, 2000–2002)
32. (Egypt) Hany Moustafa (1990)
33. (Germany) Dietrich Weise (1990–1991)
34. (Egypt) Mahmoud Saad (1992)
35. (Egypt) Mohamed Shehta (1993)
36. (Romania) Mircea Rădulescu (1993–1994)
37. (Netherlands) Nol de Ruiter (1994–1995)
38. (Egypt) Mohsen Saleh (1995, 2002–2004)
39. (Netherlands) Ruud Krol (1996)
40. (Egypt) Farouk Gaafar (1996–1997)
41. (France) Gerard Gili (1999–2000)
42. (Italy) Marco Tardelli (2004–2005)
43. (Egypt) Hassan Shehata (2005–2011)
44. (United States) Bob Bradley (2011–2013)
45. (Egypt) Shawky Gharieb (2013–2014)
46. (Argentina) Héctor Cúper (2015–2018)
47. (Mexico) Javier Aguirre (2018–2019)
48. (Egypt) Hossam El Badry (2019–2021)
49. (Portugal) Carlos Queiroz (2021–2022)
50. (Egypt) Ehab Galal (2022)
51. (Portugal) Rui Vitória (2022–2024)
52. (Egypt) Hossam Hassan (2024–2026)
53. (Egypt) Ali Maher (2026-Present)

== Players ==
=== Current squad ===
The following 26 players were called up for the 2027 Africa Cup of Nations qualification matches against Angola and South Sudan on 25 and 29 September 2026 and the friendly match against South Africa on 4 October 2026.

Information correct as of 25 September 2026, after the match against Angola.

No.	Pos.	Player	Date of birth (age)	Caps	Goals	Club
1	GK	Mostafa Shobeir	17 March 2000 (age 26)	15	0	(Egyptian Football Association) Al Ahly
26	GK	Mohamed Alaa	1 September 1999 (age 27)	0	0	(Egyptian Football Association) Ceramica Cleopatra
	GK	Abdelaziz El Balouti	8 January 1994 (age 32)	0	0	(Egyptian Football Association) National Bank of Egypt
16	GK	El Mahdy Soliman	8 June 1987 (age 39)	0	0	(Egyptian Football Association) Zamalek
5	DF	Ramy Rabia	20 May 1993 (age 33)	50	5	(United Arab Emirates Football Association) Al Ain
3	DF	Mohamed Hany	25 January 1996 (age 30)	48	0	(Egyptian Football Association) Al Ahly
13	DF	Ahmed Fatouh	22 March 1998 (age 28)	43	1	(Egyptian Football Association) Zamalek
6	DF	Mohamed Abdelmonem	1 February 1999 (age 27)	38	3	(French Football Federation) Nice
4	DF	Hossam Abdelmaguid	30 April 2001 (age 25)	16	0	(Bulgarian Football Union) Ludogorets Razgrad
15	DF	Karim Hafez	12 March 1996 (age 30)	12	0	(Egyptian Football Association) Pyramids
24	DF	Tarek Alaa	5 January 2002 (age 24)	3	0	(Egyptian Football Association) ZED
2	DF	Omar Fayed	4 July 2003 (age 23)	0	0	(Italian Football Federation) Frosinone
10	MF	Mohamed Salah (captain)	15 June 1992 (age 34)	123	70	(Turkish Football Federation) Trabzonspor
25	MF	Zizo	10 January 1996 (age 30)	68	5	(Egyptian Football Association) Al Ahly
19	MF	Marwan Attia	12 August 1998 (age 28)	39	1	(Egyptian Football Association) Al Ahly
8	MF	Emam Ashour	20 February 1998 (age 28)	35	2	(Egyptian Football Association) Al Ahly
17	MF	Mohanad Lasheen	29 May 1996 (age 30)	28	0	(Egyptian Football Association) Pyramids
20	MF	Ibrahim Adel	23 April 2001 (age 25)	26	3	(Danish Football Association) Nordsjælland
21	MF	Mahmoud Saber	30 July 2001 (age 25)	18	2	(Egyptian Football Association) Pyramids
11	MF	Mostafa Ziko	27 April 1997 (age 29)	8	4	(Egyptian Football Association) Pyramids
12	MF	Haissem Hassan	8 February 2002 (age 24)	7	0	(Scottish Football Association) Celtic
18	MF	Ali Mahmoud	4 December 2002 (age 23)	1	0	(Egyptian Football Association) Al Ahly
7	FW	Osama Faisal	1 January 2001 (age 25)	16	0	(Egyptian Football Association) National Bank of Egypt
22	FW	Omar Marmoush	7 February 1999 (age 27)	56	11	(The Football Association) Tottenham Hotspur
9	FW	Hamza Abdelkarim	1 January 2008 (age 18)	7	0	(Royal Spanish Football Federation) Barcelona

=== Recent call-ups ===
The following players have been called up to the national team in the past 12 months but are not part of the current squad.

Pos.	Player	Date of birth (age)	Caps	Goals	Club	Latest call-up
GK	Mohamed El Shenawy	18 December 1988 (age 37)	76	0	(Egypt) Al Ahly	2026 FIFA World Cup
GK	Mohamed Sobhi	15 July 1999 (age 27)	6	0	(Egypt) Zamalek	2025 Africa Cup of Nations
GK	Mohamed Awad	6 July 1992 (age 34)	4	0	(Egypt) Zamalek	2025 FIFA Arab Cup
GK	Mohamed Bassam	25 December 1990 (age 35)	3	0	(Egypt) Ceramica Cleopatra	2025 FIFA Arab Cup
GK	Ali Lotfi	1 October 1989 (age 37)	1	0	(Egypt) ZED	2025 FIFA Arab Cup
DF	Yasser Ibrahim	10 February 1993 (age 33)	22	2	(Egypt) Al Ahly	2026 FIFA World Cup
DF	Khaled Sobhi	4 May 1995 (age 31)	7	0	(Egypt) Al Masry	v. Spain, 31 March 2026
DF	Mohamed Hamdy	15 March 1995 (age 31)	36	1	(Egypt) Pyramids	2025 Africa Cup of Nations
DF	Ahmed Eid	2 January 2001 (age 25)	5	0	(Egypt) Al Ahly	2025 Africa Cup of Nations
DF	Mohamed Ismail	1 August 1999 (age 27)	1	0	(Egypt) Zamalek	2025 Africa Cup of Nations
DF	El-Wensh	1 June 1995 (age 31)	27	5	(Egypt) Zamalek	2025 FIFA Arab Cup
DF	Karim Fouad	1 October 1999 (age 27)	3	0	(Egypt) Al Ahly	2025 FIFA Arab Cup
DF	Yassin Marei	7 November 2001 (age 25)	3	0	(Egypt) Al Ahly	2025 FIFA Arab Cup
DF	Yehia Zakaria	20 December 2001 (age 24)	3	0	(Egypt) Ghazl El Mahalla	2025 FIFA Arab Cup
DF	Karim El Eraki	29 November 1997 (age 28)	2	0	(Egypt) Al Masry	2025 FIFA Arab Cup
DF	Ragab Nabil	5 January 1993 (age 33)	2	0	(Egypt) Ceramica Cleopatra	2025 FIFA Arab Cup
DF	Ahmed Hany	19 May 1997 (age 29)	1	0	(Egypt) Ceramica Cleopatra	2025 FIFA Arab Cup
DF	Hady Reyad	10 June 1998 (age 28)	0	0	(Egypt) Al Ahly	2025 FIFA Arab Cup
MF	Hamdy Fathy	29 September 1994 (age 32)	67	3	(Qatar) Al-Wakrah	v. Angola, 23 September 2026 ^{INJ}
MF	Trézéguet	1 October 1994 (age 32)	100	24	(Saudi Arabia) Al-Riyadh	2026 FIFA World Cup
MF	Donga	6 April 1996 (age 30)	12	0	(Saudi Arabia) Al-Najma	2026 FIFA World Cup
MF	Ahmed Nabil Koka	4 July 2001 (age 25)	11	0	(Egypt) Al Ahly	v. Spain, 31 March 2026
MF	Mohamed Shehata	8 February 2001 (age 25)	9	0	(Egypt) Zamalek	2025 Africa Cup of Nations
MF	Mohamed Elneny	11 July 1992 (age 34)	105	8	(Greece) Levadiakos	2025 FIFA Arab Cup
MF	Amr El Solia	2 April 1990 (age 36)	54	1	(Egypt) Ceramica Cleopatra	2025 FIFA Arab Cup
MF	Afsha	6 March 1996 (age 30)	24	6	(Egypt) Al Ahly	2025 FIFA Arab Cup
MF	Mostafa Saad	22 August 2001 (age 25)	18	1	(Egypt) ZED	2025 FIFA Arab Cup
MF	Akram Tawfik	8 November 1997 (age 29)	15	1	(Egypt) Al Ahly	2025 FIFA Arab Cup
MF	Mido Gaber	9 May 1995 (age 31)	4	1	(Egypt) Al Mokawloon Al Arab	2025 FIFA Arab Cup
MF	Ghanam Mohamed	12 March 1997 (age 29)	4	0	(Egypt) Modern Sport	2025 FIFA Arab Cup
MF	Zalaka	12 September 1999 (age 27)	3	0	(Egypt) Pyramids	2025 Al Ain International Cup
MF	Marwan Otaka	7 July 2002 (age 24)	1	0	(Egypt) Ceramica Cleopatra	2025 Al Ain International Cup
FW	Aqtay Abdallah	1 June 2003 (age 23)	0	0	(Egypt) Al Ahly	2026 FIFA World Cup ^{PRE}
FW	Mostafa Mohamed	28 November 1997 (age 28)	61	14	(Turkey) Konyaspor	v. Spain, 31 March 2026
FW	Islam Issa	1 February 1996 (age 30)	6	1	(Egypt) Ceramica Cleopatra	v. Spain, 31 March 2026
FW	Nasser Mansi	16 November 1997 (age 29)	0	0	(Egypt) Zamalek	v. Spain, 31 March 2026
FW	Osama Faisal	1 January 2001 (age 25)	16	0	National Bank of Egypt	2025 Africa Cup of Nations
FW	Salah Mohsen	1 September 1998 (age 28)	10	1	(Egypt) Al Masry	2025 Africa Cup of Nations
FW	Mohamed Sherif	4 February 1996 (age 30)	23	3	(Iraq) Al-Zawraa	2025 FIFA Arab Cup
FW	Marwan Hamdy	15 November 1996 (age 30)	17	3	(Iraq) Al-Karma	2025 FIFA Arab Cup
FW	Hossam Hassan	2 September 1993 (age 33)	7	1	(Egypt) Al Ittihad Alexandria	2025 FIFA Arab Cup
FW	Mohamed Mosaad	14 September 2001 (age 25)	0	0	(Egypt) Modern Sport	2025 FIFA Arab Cup
FW	Ahmed Atef	21 March 1998 (age 28)	3	0	(Egypt) ZED	2025 FIFA Arab Cup ^{PRE}
FW	Mostafa Shalaby	1 September 1994 (age 32)	1	0	National Bank of Egypt	2025 FIFA Arab Cup ^{INJ}
FW	Taher Mohamed	7 March 1997 (age 29)	6	1	(Egypt) Al Ahly	2025 Al Ain International Cup
Notes: ^{INJ} = Player withdrew from the squad due to an injury.; ^{PRE} = Preliminary squad/standby.; ^{RET} = Retired from the national team.; ^{SUS} = Player suspended from the squad for disciplinary reasons.; ^{WD} = Player withdrew from the squad for non-injury related reasons.

== Records ==
As of 17 November 2026
Players in bold are still active with Egypt.

=== Most appearances ===
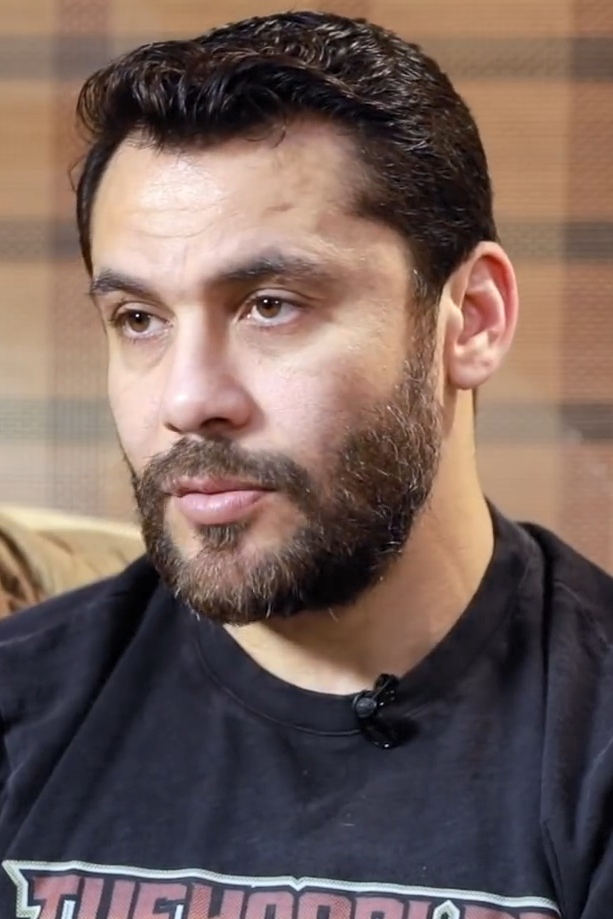
Ahmed Hassan is Egypt's most capped player with 184 appearances.

Rank	Player	Caps	Goals	Career
1	Ahmed Hassan	184	33	1995–2012
2	Hossam Hassan (Note: Matches against UAE and Morocco (in 1988), Kuwait (in 1989), Mali (twice in 1994) and Ghana (in 1997) are not considered full internationals by FIFA but they are recognised by the Egyptian FA.)	176	69	1985–2006
3	Essam El Hadary	159	0	1996–2018
4	Ahmed Fathy	136	3	2002–2021
5	Ibrahim Hassan	131	17	1988–2002
6	**Mohamed Salah**	124	70	2011–present
6	Hany Ramzy	123	3	1988–2003
8	Wael Gomaa	114	1	2001–2013
9	Ahmed El Kass	112	25	1987–1997
9	Abdel Zaher El Saka	112	4	1997–2010

=== Top goalscorers ===
Mohamed Salah is Egypt's all-time top scorer with 70 goals.

Rank	Player	Goals	Caps	Ratio	Career
1	**Mohamed Salah**	70	124	0.56	2011–present
2	Hossam Hassan	69	176	0.39	1985–2006
3	Hassan El Shazly	49	64	0.77	1961–1975
4	El-Sayed El-Dhizui	41	50	0.82	1948–1960
5	Mohamed Abou Trika	38	100	0.38	2001–2013
6	Ahmed Hassan	33	184	0.18	1995–2012
7	Amr Zaki	30	63	0.48	2004–2013
8	Emad Moteab	28	70	0.4	2004–2015
9	Badawi Abdel Fattah	27	27	1	1960–1966
10	Moustafa Reyadh	26	66	0.39	1962–1972

== Competitive records ==
=== FIFA World Cup ===
FIFA World Cup record										FIFA World Cup qualification record					
Year	Round	Position	Pld	W	D*	L	GF	GA	Squad	Pld	W	D	L	GF	GA
(Uruguay) 1930	Withdrew due to storm									Qualified as invitees					
(Italy) 1934	Round of 16	13th	1	0	0	1	2	4	Squad	2	2	0	0	11	2
(France) 1938	Withdrew									Withdrew					
(Brazil) 1950	Did not enter									Did not enter					
(Switzerland) 1954	Did not qualify									2	0	0	2	2	7
(Sweden) 1958	Withdrew									Withdrew					
(Chile) 1962	Withdrew									Withdrew					
(England) 1966	Withdrew									Withdrew					
(Mexico) 1970	Did not enter									Did not enter					
(West Germany) 1974	Did not qualify									2	1	0	1	2	3
(Argentina) 1978	Did not qualify									10	6	2	2	15	12
(Spain) 1982	Did not qualify									2	0	1	1	0	1
(Mexico) 1986	Did not qualify									6	2	2	2	3	4
(Italy) 1990	Group stage	20th	3	0	2	1	1	2	Squad	8	4	3	1	7	2
(United States) 1994	Did not qualify									6	3	2	1	9	3
(France) 1998	Did not qualify									6	3	1	2	15	5
(South Korea) (Japan) 2002	Did not qualify									10	5	4	1	22	9
(Germany) 2006	Did not qualify									10	5	2	3	26	15
(South Africa) 2010	Did not qualify									13	9	1	3	22	7
(Brazil) 2014	Did not qualify									8	7	0	1	19	14
(Russia) 2018	Group stage	31st	3	0	0	3	2	6	Squad	8	5	1	2	12	5
(Qatar) 2022	Did not qualify									8	5	2	1	11	5
(Canada) (Mexico) (United States) 2026	Round of 16	15th	5	1	3	1	8	7	Squad	10	8	2	0	20	2
(Morocco) (Portugal) (Spain) 2030	To be determined									To be determined					
(Saudi Arabia) 2034	To be determined									To be determined					
Total:4/22	Round of 16	13th	11	1	4	6	12	18	—	111	65	23	23	196	96

=== Africa Cup of Nations ===
Africa Cup of Nations record										Africa Cup of Nations qualification record					
Year	Round	Position	Pld	W	D*	L	GF	GA	Squad	Pld	W	D	L	GF	GA
(Sudan) 1957	Champions	1st	2	2	0	0	6	1	Squad	No Qualification					
(United Arab Republic) 1959	Champions	1st	2	2	0	0	6	1	Squad	No Qualification					
(Ethiopia) 1962	Runners-up	2nd	2	1	0	1	4	5	Squad	Qualified as defending champions					
(Ghana) 1963	Third place	3rd	3	2	1	0	11	5	Squad	Qualified by default					
(Tunisia) 1965	Withdrew									Withdrew					
(Ethiopia) 1968	Withdrew during qualifications									3	2	1	0	6	4
(Sudan) 1970	Third place	3rd	5	3	1	1	10	5	Squad	2	1	1	0	2	1
(Cameroon) 1972	Did not qualify									4	3	0	1	6	6
(Egypt) 1974	Third place	3rd	5	4	0	1	13	5	Squad	Qualified as hosts					
(Ethiopia) 1976	Fourth place	4th	6	1	2	3	9	12	Squad	4	3	1	0	11	3
(Ghana) 1978	Did not qualify									2	0	1	1	4	5
(Nigeria) 1980	Fourth place	4th	5	2	1	2	6	7	Squad	2	1	0	1	4	3
(Libya) 1982	Withdrew									2	2	0	0	7	3
(Ivory Coast) 1984	Fourth place	4th	5	2	2	1	6	6	Squad	4	2	1	1	3	2
(Egypt) 1986	Champions	1st	5	3	1	1	5	1	Squad	Qualified as hosts					
(Morocco) 1988	Group stage	6th	3	1	1	1	3	1	Squad	Qualified as defending champions					
(Algeria) 1990	Group stage	8th	3	0	0	3	1	6	Squad	4	2	1	1	8	2
(Senegal) 1992	Group stage	11th	2	0	0	2	0	2	Squad	6	3	3	0	13	5
(Tunisia) 1994	Quarter-finals	5th	3	1	1	1	4	1	Squad	6	2	2	2	6	5
(South Africa) 1996	Quarter-finals	7th	4	2	0	2	5	6	Squad	10	6	3	1	24	5
(Burkina Faso) 1998	Champions	1st	6	4	1	1	10	1	Squad	6	2	3	1	12	4
(Ghana) (Nigeria) 2000	Quarter-finals	5th	4	3	0	1	7	3	Squad	Qualified as defending champions					
(Mali) 2002	Quarter-finals	6th	4	2	0	2	3	3	Squad	6	4	1	1	11	6
(Tunisia) 2004	Group stage	9th	3	1	1	1	3	3	Squad	4	3	0	1	14	1
(Egypt) 2006	Champions	1st	6	4	2	0	12	3	Squad	Qualified as hosts					
(Ghana) 2008	Champions	1st	6	5	1	0	15	5	Squad	6	3	3	0	9	2
(Angola) 2010	Champions	1st	6	6	0	0	15	2	Squad	13	9	1	3	22	7
(Equatorial Guinea) (Gabon) 2012	Did not qualify									6	1	2	3	5	5
(South Africa) 2013	Did not qualify									2	0	1	1	3	4
(Equatorial Guinea) 2015	Did not qualify									6	2	0	4	5	6
(Gabon) 2017	Runners-up	2nd	6	3	2	1	5	3	Squad	4	3	1	0	7	1
(Egypt) 2019	Round of 16	10th	4	3	0	1	5	1	Squad	6	4	1	1	16	5
(Cameroon) 2021	Runners-up	2nd	7	3	3	1	4	2	Squad	6	3	3	0	10	3
(Ivory Coast) 2023	Round of 16	12th	4	0	4	0	7	7	Squad	6	5	0	1	10	3
(Morocco) 2025	Fourth place	4th	7	4	2	1	9	5	Squad	6	4	2	0	12	2
(Kenya) (Tanzania) (Uganda) 2027	To be determined									To be determined					
2028	To be determined									To be determined					
Total	7 Titles	27/35	118	64	26	28	184	102	—	125	70	31	24	229	92

=== Summer Olympics ===
Egypt withdrew from the 1956 Football tournament and boycotted the 1980 Olympics, after qualifying for both.

Summer Olympics record
Year	Round	Position	Pld	W	D*	L	GF	GA	Squad
(United Kingdom) 1908	Did not participate								
(Sweden) 1912	Did not participate								
(Belgium) 1920	First round	8th	1	0	0	1	1	2	Squad
(France) 1924	Quarter-final	8th	2	1	0	1	3	5	Squad
(Netherlands) 1928	Fourth place	4th	4	2	0	2	12	19	Squad
(Germany) 1936	First round	11th	1	0	0	1	1	3	Squad
(United Kingdom) 1948	First round	13th	1	0	0	1	1	3	Squad
(Finland) 1952	First round	12th	2	1	0	1	6	7	Squad
(Australia) 1956	Withdrew from Finals								
(Italy) 1960	First round	12th	3	0	1	2	4	11	Squad
(Japan) 1964	Fourth place	4th	6	2	1	3	18	16	Squad
(Mexico) 1968	Withdrew from qualifiers								
(Germany) 1972	Did not qualify								
(Canada) 1976	Did not qualify								
(Soviet Union) 1980	Withdrew from finals								
(United States) 1984	Quarter-final	8th	4	1	1	2	5	5	Squad
(South Korea) 1988	Did not qualify								
1992 to present	See Egypt national under-23 football team								
Total	Fourth place	9/17	24	7	3	14	51	71	—

=== African Games ===
African Games record
Year	Round	Position	Pld	W	D*	L	GF	GA
(Republic of the Congo) 1965	Did not qualify							
(Nigeria) 1973	Bronze medal	3rd	5	3	0	2	12	12
(Algeria) 1978	Withdrew (Note: In the Egypt-Libya match, the match was abandoned due to a mass brawl between the two teams, their referees, and their fans. Libya was expelled from the tournament, while Egypt withdrew after several of its players were injured, in protest against Algerian police brutality and stadium security.)	7th	3	2	1	0	6	2
(Kenya) 1987	Gold medal	1st	5	3	1	1	7	5
1991 to 2015	See Egypt national under-23 football team							
2019 to present	See Egypt national under-20 football team							
Total	1 Title	3/4	13	8	2	3	19	19

=== Arab Games ===
Arab Games record
Year	Round	Position	Pld	W	D*	L	GF	GA
(Egypt) 1953	Gold medal	1st	3	3	0	0	22	3
(Lebanon) 1957	Did not enter							
(Morocco) 1961	Did not enter							
(United Arab Republic) 1965	Gold medal	1st	6	6	0	0	30	2
(Syria) 1976	Did not enter							
(Morocco) 1985	Did not enter							
(Lebanon) 1997	Did not enter							
(Jordan) 1999	Did not enter							
(Egypt) 2007	Gold medal	1st	4	3	1	0	10	1
(Qatar) 2011	Did not enter							
2023 to present	See Egypt national under-23 football team							
Total	3 Titles	3/10	13	12	1	0	62	6

=== FIFA Confederations Cup ===
FIFA Confederations Cup record
Year	Round	Position	Pld	W	D*	L	GF	GA	Squad
(Saudi Arabia) 1992	Did not qualify								
(Saudi Arabia) 1995	Did not qualify								
(Saudi Arabia) 1997	Did not qualify								
(Mexico) 1999	Group stage	7th	3	0	2	1	5	9	Squad
(South Korea) (Japan) 2001	Did not qualify								
(France) 2003	Did not qualify								
(Germany) 2005	Did not qualify								
(South Africa) 2009	Group stage	6th	3	1	0	2	4	7	Squad
(Brazil) 2013	Did not qualify								
(Russia) 2017	Did not qualify								
Total	Group stage	2/10	6	1	2	3	9	16	—

=== FIFA Arab Cup ===
FIFA Arab Cup record
Year	Round	Position	Pld	W	D*	L	GF	GA	Squad
(Lebanon) 1963	Did not enter								
(Kuwait) 1964	Did not enter								
(Iraq) 1966	Did not enter								
(Saudi Arabia) 1985	Did not enter								
(Jordan) 1988	Third place	3rd	6	3	2	1	6	0	Squad
(Syria) 1992	Champions	1st	4	3	1	0	5	3	Squad
(Qatar) 1998	Group stage	10th	2	1	0	1	3	5	Squad
(Kuwait) 2002	Did not enter								
(Saudi Arabia) 2012	Group stage	7th	3	0	2	1	3	4	Squad
(Qatar) 2021	Fourth place	4th	6	3	2	1	10	2	Squad
(Qatar) 2025	Group stage	12th	3	0	2	1	2	5	Squad
Total	1 Title	5/10	24	10	9	9	29	19	—

== Head-to-head record ==
The following table shows Egypt's all-time international record, correct as of 4 October 2026.

Egypt national football team head-to-head record
Against	Pld	Won	Drawn	Lost	GF	GA	GD	Last Played	Best Result	Notes
Algeria	29	7	12	10	34	34	0	16 October 2023	Egypt 4 – 0 Algeria (Angola; 28 January 2010)	1 PSO win for Algeria
Angola	9	4	5	0	11	7	+4	25 September 2026	Egypt 2 – 1 Angola (Ghana; 4 February 2008) (South Africa; 15 January 1996)	
Argentina	3	0	0	3	2	11	−9	7 July 2026	Egypt 0 – 2 Argentina (Egypt; 26 March 2008)	
Australia	3	1	2	0	4	1	+3	3 July 2026	Egypt 3 – 0 Australia (Egypt; 18 November 2010)	1 PSO win for Australia
Austria	3	1	1	1	2	3	-1	28 February 1990	UAR 1 – 0 Austria (Egypt; 5 January 1962)	
Bahrain	1	1	0	0	1	0	+1	15 December 2003	Bahrain 0 – 1 Egypt (Bahrain; 15 December 2003)	
Belarus	1	1	0	0	2	0	+2	5 January 1997	Egypt 2 – 0 Belarus (Egypt; 5 January 1997)	
Belgium	5	3	1	1	8	5	+3	15 June 2026	Egypt 4 – 0 Belgium (Egypt; 9 February 2005)	
Benin	5	4	1	0	17	6	+11	5 January 2026	Egypt 5 – 1 Benin (Egypt; 19 November 2008)	
Bolivia	1	0	1	0	2	2	0	25 July 1999	Bolivia 2 – 2 Egypt (Mexico; 25 July 1999)	
Bosnia and Herzegovina	1	1	0	0	2	0	+2	5 March 2014	Egypt 2 – 0 Bosnia and Herzegovina (Austria; 5 March 2014)	
Botswana	7	5	2	0	11	1	+10	19 November 2024	Botswana 0 – 4 Egypt (Botswana; 10 September 2024)	
Brazil	7	0	0	7	6	20	−15	6 June 2026	Brazil 4 – 3 Egypt (South Africa; 15 June 2009)	
Bulgaria	10	5	2	3	9	6	+3	29 November 2004	Egypt 3 – 1 Bulgaria (Hong Kong; 16 February 1999)	
Burkina Faso	9	6	3	0	22	18	+4	9 September 2025	Egypt 4 – 2 Burkina Faso (Nigeria; 1 February 2000) (Nigeria; 12 January 1973)	1 PSO win for Egypt
Burundi	6	4	2	0	12	1	+11	11 January 2001	Egypt 4 – 1 Burundi (Egypt; 2 September 2006) Egypt 3 – 0 Burundi (Egypt; 11 January 2011) (Burundi; 14 September 1976)	
Cameroon	28	14	8	6	34	22	+12	3 February 2022	Egypt 4 – 0 Cameroon (Egypt; 29 May 1983)	3 PSO wins for Egypt
Canada	2	2	0	0	4	0	+4	24 April 2001	Egypt 3 – 0 Canada (Egypt; 24 April 2001)	
Cape Verde	4	1	3	0	7	4	+3	17 November 2025	Egypt 3 – 0 Cape Verde (Egypt; 6 September 2024)	
Central African Republic	2	0	1	1	3	4	-1	30 June 2012	Central African Republic 1 – 1 Egypt (Central African Republic; 30 June 2012)	
Chad	6	4	1	1	18	3	+15	17 November 2015	Egypt 5 – 1 Chad (Egypt; 12 July 1991) Egypt 4 – 0 Chad (Egypt; 31 March 2012) Egypt 4 – 0 Chad (Egypt; 17 November 2015)	
Chile	3	1	0	2	5	5	0	30 May 2014	Egypt 2 – 0 Chile (Egypt; 3 June 1989)	
China	2	1	1	0	2	0	+2	17 January 2001	(Egypt) UAR 2 – 0 China (Indonesia; 30 April 1963)	1 PSO win for Egypt
Colombia	2	0	2	0	1	1	0	26 May 1990	Egypt 1 – 1 Colombia (Egypt; 30 May 1990)	
Comoros	2	1	1	0	4	0	+4	29 March 2021	Egypt 4 – 0 Comoros (Egypt; 29 March 2021)	
Congo	8	7	0	1	17	5	+12	8 October 2017	Egypt 4 – 0 Congo (Egypt; 11 March 1974)	
Croatia	3	0	1	2	6	10	–4	26 March 2024	Croatia 2 – 2 Egypt (South Korea; 13 June 1999)	
Czech Republic	3	2	0	1	4	2	+2	4 January 1992	Egypt 2 – 0 Czech Republic (Egypt; 4 January 1992)	
Denmark	3	0	1	2	2	7	−5	12 February 2003	Egypt 0 – 0 Denmark (Egypt; 14 February 1990)	
Djibouti	4	4	0	0	17	0	+17	8 October 2025	Egypt 6 – 0 Djibouti (Egypt; 16 November 2023)	
DR Congo	11	6	4	1	22	11	+11	28 January 2024	Egypt 6 – 3 DR Congo (Egypt; August 2010) Egypt 4 – 1 DR Congo (Egypt; 4 February 2006)	1 PSO win for DR Congo
England	3	0	0	3	1	8	−7	3 March 2010	England 1 – 0 Egypt (Italy; 21 June 1990)	
Estonia	2	0	2	0	5	5	0	19 March 2001	Egypt 3 – 3 Estonia (Egypt; 19 March 2001)	
Ethiopia	19	14	2	3	52	13	+39	5 September 2025	Egypt 8 – 1 Ethiopia (Egypt; 7 July 1997)	
Finland	2	2	0	0	4	2	+2	13 January 1989	Egypt 2 – 1 Finland (Egypt; 13 January 1989) (Egypt; 11 January 1989)	
France	1	0	0	1	0	5	−5	30 April 2003	France 5 – 0 Egypt (France; 30 April 2003)	
North Macedonia	1	0	1	0	2	2	0	29 September 1998	Macedonia 2 – 2 Egypt (Macedonia; 29 September 1998)	
Gabon	5	4	1	0	13	2	+11	16 November 2021	Egypt 4 – 0 Gabon (Egypt; 5 January 2000) (Tunisia; 28 March 1994)	
Georgia	1	0	1	0	0	0	0	14 November 2012	Georgia 0 – 0 Egypt (Georgia; 14 November 2012)	
Germany	1	1	0	0	2	1	+1	28 December 1958	Egypt 2 – 1 Germany (Egypt; 28 December 1958)	
Ghana	21	10	6	5	29	20	+9	18 January 2024	Egypt 2 – 0 Ghana (Egypt; 4 January 2002) (Egypt; 17 June 2000) (South Korea; 16 June 1997) (Egypt; 23 August 1994) (Egypt; 13 November 2016)	
Greece	9	3	1	5	12	18	−6	27 March 2018	Egypt 3 – 1 Greece (Egypt; 19 June 1936) Egypt 2 – 0 Greece (Egypt; 17 February 1950)	
Guinea	11	6	3	2	24	19	+5	14 June 2023	(Egypt) UAR 4 – 1 Guinea (Sudan; 7 February 1970)	
Guinea-Bissau	3	2	1	0	3	1	+2	12 October 2025	Guinea-Bissau 0 – 1 Egypt (Cameroon; 15 January 2022)	
Hungary	5	1	1	3	2	9	−7	17 February 1961	Egypt 3 – 0 Hungary (Paris; 29 May 1924)	
Indonesia	3	2	1	0	11	3	+8	11 June 1991	Indonesia 0 – 6 Egypt (South Korea; 11 June 1991)	
Iran	2	0	2	0	2	2	0	26 June 2026	Iran 1–1 (8–9 PSO) Egypt (Iran; 7 June 2000)	1 PSO win for Egypt
Iraq	7	4	3	0	7	1	+6	17 April 2012	Iraq 1 – 3 Egypt (Iraq; 14 January 1972)	
Italy	3	1	0	2	3	7	−4	18 June 2009	Egypt 1 – 0 Italy (South Africa; 18 June 2009)	
Ivory Coast	23	11	6	6	31	25	+6	10 January 2026	Ivory Coast 1 – 4 Egypt (Ghana; 7 February 2008)	
Jamaica	1	0	1	0	2	2	0	4 June 2014	Egypt 2 – 2 Jamaica (England; 4 June 2014)	
Japan	2	0	0	2	1	5	−4	17 October 2007	Japan 1 – 0 Egypt (Japan; 28 October 1998)	
Jordan	5	3	0	2	10	5	+8	9 December 2025	Egypt 5 – 0 Jordan (Syria; 2 October 1974)	
Kenya	19	13	5	1	36	11	+25	25 March 2021	Egypt 5 – 0 Kenya (Qatar; 27 February 2012)	
North Korea	1	1	0	0	1	0	+1	23 January 2001	Egypt 1 – 0 North Korea (Egypt; 23 January 2001)	
South Korea	17	5	6	6	21	19	+2	14 June 2022	(Egypt) UAR 10 – 0 South Korea (Japan; 16 October 1964)	2 PSO wins for Korea Republic
Kuwait	12	4	7	1	15	11	+4	2 December 2025	(Egypt) UAR 8 – 0 Kuwait (Morocco; 4 September 1961)	
Laos	1	1	0	0	15	0	+15	16 November 2018	Laos 0 - 15 Egypt (Indonesia; 15 November 1963)	
Lebanon	7	6	1	0	16	2	+14	1 December 2021	Lebanon 1 – 4 Egypt (Libya; 11 May 2012) Egypt 3 – 0 Lebanon (Jordan; 15 July 1988) (Egypt; 28 August 1965)	
Liberia	7	5	0	2	13	2	+11	27 September 2022	Egypt 5 – 0 Liberia (Egypt; 17 August 1997)	
Libya	17	11	3	3	36	13	+23	11 October 2021	Egypt 10 – 2 Libya (Egypt; 6 August 1953)	
Lithuania	1	1	0	0	10	0	+10	1 June 1924	Egypt 10 – 0 Lithuania (France; 1 June 1924)	
Luxembourg	1	0	1	0	1	1	0	28 June 1928	Luxembourg 1-1 Egypt (Luxembourg; 28 June 1928)	
Madagascar	4	2	0	2	7	2	+5	20 June 2003	Egypt 6 – 0 Madagascar (Egypt; 20 June 2003)	1 PSO win for Egypt
Malawi	11	6	2	3	18	7	+11	28 March 2023	Egypt 4 – 0 Malawi (Malawi; 28 March 2023)	
Mali	10	4	2	4	8	8	0	17 January 2017	Egypt 2 – 1 Mali (Egypt; 9 April 1993)	
Malta	2	2	0	0	8	2	+5	5 November 1993	Egypt 5 – 2 Malta (South Korea; 9 June 1991)	
Mauritania	5	4	1	0	10	1	+9	15 October 2024	Egypt 3 – 0 Mauritania (Egypt; 25 March 2007) (United Arab Emirates; 15 April 2012)	
Mauritius	5	5	0	0	18	2	+16	2 October 2009	Egypt 7 – 0 Mauritius (Egypt; 8 June 2003)	
Mexico	3	0	1	2	2	7	−5	27 July 1999	Mexico 2 – 2 Egypt (Mexico; 27 July 1999)	
Morocco	28	4	11	13	16	31	−15	30 January 2022	Egypt 1 – 0 Morocco (Egypt; 17 March 1986) UAR 3 – 2 Morocco (Egypt; 21 March 1971)	
Mozambique	6	5	1	0	11	2	+9	14 January 2024	Egypt 2 – 0 Mozambique (Egypt; 1 June 2012) (Angola; 16 January 2010) (Burkina Faso; 10 February 1998) (Egypt; 13 March 1986)	
Namibia	6	5	1	0	23	6	+17	5 January 2008	Egypt 8 – 2 Namibia (Egypt; 13 July 2001)	
Netherlands	3	1	2	0	4	3	+1	12 June 1990	Netherlands 1 – 2 Egypt (Netherlands; 14 June 1928)	
New Zealand	5	4	1	0	7	2	+5	21 June 2026	New Zealand 1 – 3 Egypt (Vancouver; 21 June 2026)	
Niger	6	4	1	1	14	2	+12	23 September 2022	Egypt 6 – 0 Niger (Alexandria; 8 September 2018)	
Nigeria	22	7	7	8	27	30	−3	17 January 2026	(Egypt) UAR 6 – 3 Nigeria (Nigeria; 24 November 1963)	2 PSO wins for Nigeria
Norway	4	0	3	1	2	5	−3	18 November 1998	Egypt 1 – 1 Norway (Egypt; 18 November 1998) (Egypt; 24 December 1948)	
Oman	2	1	1	0	2	1	+1	15 August 2012	Oman 0 – 1 Egypt (Oman; 30 May 2009)	
Poland	2	1	1	0	4	0	+4	5 December 1991	Egypt 4 – 0 Poland (Egypt; 3 December 1991)	
Portugal	5	1	0	4	4	11	−7	4 June 1928	Portugal 1 – 2 Egypt (Netherlands; 4 June 1928)	
Qatar	8	4	2	2	18	7	+11	18 December 2021	Egypt 6 – 0 Qatar (Egypt; 19 March 2003)	1 PSO win for Qatar
Republic of Ireland	1	0	1	0	0	0	0	17 June 1990	Republic of Ireland 0 – 0 Egypt (Italy; 17 June 1990)	
Romania	6	1	2	3	7	9	−2	24 December 1991	Egypt 3 – 1 Romania (Egypt; 21 December 1991)	
Russia	2	1	0	1	2	3	-1	28 May 2026	Egypt 1 - 3 Russia (Russia; 19 June 2018)	
Rwanda	3	3	0	0	9	1	+8	5 September 2009	Egypt 3 – 0 Rwanda (Egypt; 5 July 2009)	
Saudi Arabia	9	6	1	2	31	9	+22	27 March 2026	(United Arab Republic) UAR 13 – 0 Saudi Arabia (Morocco; 3 September 1961)	
Scotland	1	1	0	0	3	1	+2	16 May 1990	Scotland 1 – 3 Egypt (Scotland; 16 May 1990)	
Senegal	16	7	2	7	9	8	+1	14 January 2026	Egypt 2 – 0 Senegal (Egypt; 13 July 1997)	2 PSO win for Senegal
Sierra Leone	4	2	1	1	5	3	+2	25 March 2025	Sierra Leone 0 – 2 Egypt (Sierra Leone; 19 November 2023)	
Slovakia	4	3	0	1	5	2	+3	4 February 1994	Egypt 1 – 0 Slovakia (United Arab Emirates; 4 February 1994)	
Somalia	1	1	0	0	4	2	+2	24 November 1972	Egypt 4 – 2 Somalia (Egypt; 24 November 1972 )	
South Africa	14	5	1	8	9	11	-2	4 October 2026	South Africa 0 – 2 Egypt (Burkina Faso; 28 February 1998)	
South Sudan	2	2	0	0	8	0	+8	29 September 2026	South Sudan 0 – 5 Egypt (South Sudan; 29 September 2026)	
Spain	2	0	1	1	0	2	−2	31 March 2026	Spain 2 – 0 Egypt (Spain; 3 June 2006)	
Sudan	18	14	2	2	43	16	+27	19 January 2022	Egypt 6 – 1 Sudan (Egypt; 5 June 2005)	
Swaziland	3	3	0	0	16	1	+15	16 October 2018	Egypt 10 – 0 Swaziland (Egypt; 22 March 2013)	
Sweden	4	2	0	2	3	10	−7	7 February 2007	Egypt 2 – 0 Sweden (Egypt; 7 February 2007)	
Switzerland	1	0	0	1	1	3	−2	14 December 1998	Egypt 1 – 3 Switzerland (Egypt; 14 December 1998)	
Syria	7	4	1	2	18	6	+12	31 March 1995	Egypt 8 – 0 Syria (Egypt; 12 October 1951)	1 PSO win for Syria
Tanzania	13	12	1	0	43	10	+33	7 January 2024	Egypt 6 – 0 Tanzania (Egypt; 17 April 1986)	
Thailand	1	0	1	0	1	1	0	25 January 1998	Thailand 1 – 1 Egypt (Thailand; 25 January 1998)	
Togo	10	8	1	1	26	6	+20	17 November 2020	Egypt 7 – 2 Togo (Egypt; 18 December 1997)	
Trinidad and Tobago	1	1	0	0	2	1	+1	31 March 2004	Egypt 2 – 1 Trinidad and Tobago (Egypt; 31 March 2004)	
Tunisia	37	13	8	16	38	42	–4	12 September 2023	Tunisia 0 – 4 Egypt (Tunisia; 7 November 1989)	
Turkey	6	2	0	4	10	13	–3	12 May 1949	Turkey 1 – 7 Egypt (France; 1 June 1924)	
Uganda	21	17	2	2	41	13	+28	30 June 2019	Egypt 6 – 0 Uganda (Egypt; 30 July 1995)	
United Arab Emirates	6	3	3	0	6	3	+4	6 December 2025	(United Arab Emirates) UAE 1 – 2 Egypt (UAE; 16 December 2002) (Egypt; 6 January 2001)	1 PSO win for Egypt
Uruguay	2	0	0	2	0	3	−3	15 June 2018	Egypt 0 – 1 Uruguay (Russia; 15 June 2018)	
Uzbekistan	1	0	0	1	0	2	−2	14 November 2025	Egypt 0 – 2 Uzbekistan (Uzbekistan; 14 November 2025)	
United States	2	1	0	1	3	4	−1	21 June 2009	Egypt 3 – 1 United States (South Korea; 8 June 1987)	
Vietnam	1	1	0	0	4	1	+3	1 November 1963	Egypt 4 – 1 North Vietnam (Indonesia; 1 November 1963)	
Yugoslavia	9	0	4	5	5	18	−13	14 June 1997	Yugoslavia 0 – 0 Egypt (South Korea; 14 June 1997)	
Zambia	18	11	4	3	30	16	+14	12 October 2023	Zambia 0 – 4 Egypt (Burkina Faso; 13 February 1998)	
Zimbabwe	14	9	4	1	23	12	+11	22 December 2025	Zimbabwe 2 – 4 Egypt (Zimbabwe;9 June 2013) Egypt 2 – 0 Zimbabwe (Egypt; 5 January 2006) (Egypt; 24 May 2004)	
Total	746	374	183	189	1236	759	+477	—	—	—

== Honours ==
=== Intercontinental ===
- Afro-Asian Cup of Nations
  - (silver) Runners-up (2): 1987, 2007

=== Continental ===
- CAF African Cup of Nations
  - Champions (7): 1957, 1959, 1986, 1998, 2006, 2008, 2010
  - Runners-up (3): 1962, 2017, 2021
  - Third place (3): 1963, 1970, 1974
- African Games (Note: Competition organized by ANOCA, officially not recognized by FIFA.)
  - Gold medal (1): 1987,1995
  - Bronze medal (1): 1973

=== Regional ===
- Arabophone Cup (Note: Official subregional competition organized and recognized by FIFA since 2021. Previous editions were organized by UAFA.)
  - (gold) Champions (1): 1992 (Note: The 1992 Arab Cup also counted as an edition of the Arab Games.)
  - (bronze) Third place (1): 1988
- Arabophone Games
  - (gold) Gold medal (4): 1953, 1965, 1992, 2007
  - (silver) Silver medal (1): 1961
- Palestine Cup of Nations
  - (gold) Champions (2): 1972, 1975
- Mediterranean Games
  - (gold) Gold medal (1): 1955
  - (silver) Silver Medal (1): 1951
  - (bronze) Bronze Medal (1): 1983
- Mediterranean Cup
  - (bronze) Third place (2): 1949, 1950–53

=== Friendly ===
- Nile Basin Tournament (1): 2011
- LG Cup (1): 2005
- Friendship Tournament (1): 1994
- Korea Cup (1): 1993
- Capital of Egypt Cup (1): 2026

=== Awards ===
- African National Team of the Year (3): 1998, 2008, 2017
- Africa Cup of Nations Fair Play Award (1): 2017

=== Summary ===
Competition	1st place, gold medalist(s)	2nd place, silver medalist(s)	3rd place, bronze medalist(s)	Total
CAF African Cup of Nations	7	3	3	13
Afro-Asian Cup of Nations	0	2	0	2
Total	7	5	3	15

== See also ==
- Egypt national under-23 football team (Olympic football team)
- Egypt national under-20 football team
- Egypt national under-17 football team
- Egypt women's national football team
- Football in Egypt

== Notes ==
Preceded by –	African Champions; 1957 (1st title); 1959 (2nd title)	Succeeded by 1962 Ethiopia
Preceded by 1984 Cameroon	African Champions; 1986 (3rd title)	Succeeded by 1988 Cameroon
Preceded by 1996 South Africa	African Champions; 1998 (4th title)	Succeeded by 2000 Cameroon
Preceded by 2004 Tunisia	African Champions; 2006 (5th title); 2008 (6th title); 2010 (7th title)	Succeeded by 2012 Zambia
