= Amr Fahmy =

Egyptian football executive (1983–2020)

General Secretary of the Confederation of African Football
- In office 17 November 2017 – 15 April 2019
- Preceded by: Hisham El Amrani
- Succeeded by: Mouad Hajji

Personal details
- Born: Amr Mustapha Mourad Fahmy; 28 August 1983 Giza, Cairo, Egypt
- Died: 23 February 2020 (aged 36) Cairo, Egypt
- Spouse: Hana (m. 2018)
- Children: 1 daughter

Amr Mustapha Mourad Fahmy (28 August 1983 – 23 February 2020) was an Egyptian football administrator who served as the General-Secretary of the Confederation of African Football from 2017 to 2019.

He worked at the France-based Lagardère Sports and Entertainment as the director of operations for Africa. Fahmy also worked at the CAF Competitions Division between 2007 and 2015, notably serving as the director for the 2015 Africa Cup of Nations in Equatorial Guinea. In March 2019, he sent documents to the FIFA Ethics Committee accusing CAF's President Ahmad Ahmad of corruption, bribery, and sexual harassment. On 3 December 2019, Fahmy announced he would run in the 2021 CAF Presidential elections.

Fahmy was known as one of the founders of Ultras Ahlawy, the largest supporters' group of Egypt's football giants Al Ahly SC. He died on 23 February 2020 at the age of 36 after a battle with cancer.

== Early career ==
Born in Cairo, he is the son of Mustapha Fahmy, who served as the general secretary of the Confederation of African Football from 1982 until 2010 before joining FIFA as the Director of Competitions. Fahmy's grandfather, Mourad, was one of the founding members of the Confederation of African Football, and served as general secretary from 1961 to 1982. Before joining CAF, Fahmy attended the FIFA Master's in Management, Law, and Humanities of Sports.

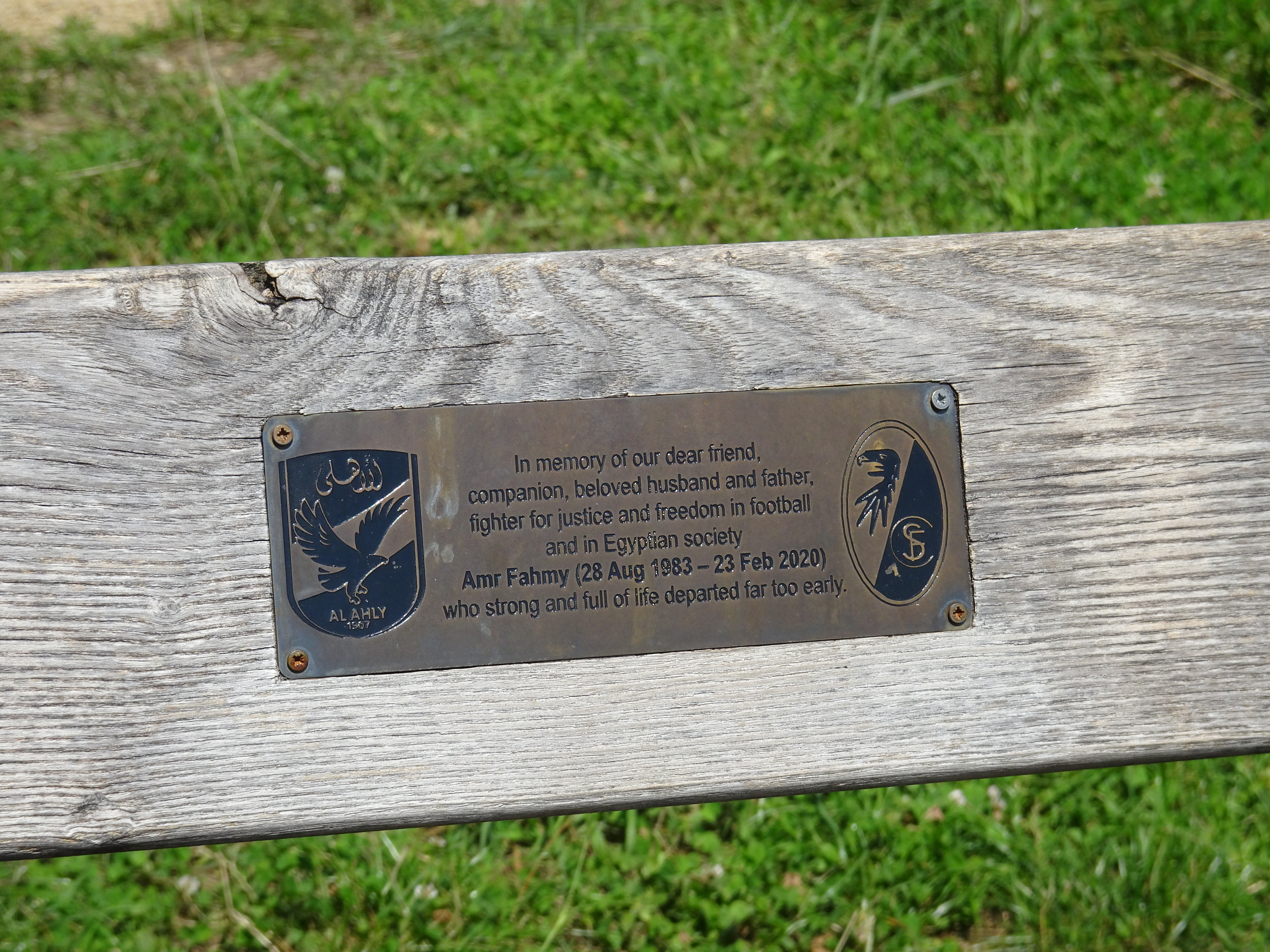
Inscription of memory bench for Amr Fahmy in Freiburg im Breisgau (Germany)

Fahmy was known to be one of the founders of Ultras Ahlawy, the main fan's group behind Cairo's Al Ahly SC. Following his death, members of Ultras Ahlawy raised flags and banners in the team's CAF Champions League match against Sundowns. The fans of Red Star Belgrade and SC Freiburg also displayed banners paying their respect to Fahmy.

== CAF Whistleblower ==
In March 2019, Fahmy was sacked by CAF after he made corruption accusations against the organization's president, Ahmad Ahmad. Fahmy had accused him of bribes and misusing hundreds of thousands of dollars, as well as harassing female CAF staff members. Fahmy sent documents to the FIFA Ethics Committee alleging that Ahmad Ahmad ordered him to pay $20,000 in bribes to presidents of African football associations. In the documents, he also accused Ahmad Ahmad of over-spending an additional $830,000 by ordering equipment from a French intermediary company called Tactical Steel. On 7 June 2019, Ahmad Ahmad was arrested by French authorities and questioned in relation to investigations into CAF's contract with Tactical Steel. He was released a day later without charge. Ahmad Ahmad was later found guilty for breaching four separate articles of the organization’s ethics code, including abuse of office, misappropriation of funds and rules concerning the offering and acceptance of gifts and was barred by FIFA for five years.
