= 2025 Al Ain International Cup =

كأس العين الدولية 2025

Tournament details
- Host country: United Arab Emirates
- City: Al Ain
- Dates: 13–18 November
- Teams: 4 (from 2 confederations)
- Venue: 1 (in 1 host city)

Final positions
- Champions: Uzbekistan
- Runners-up: Iran
- Third place: Egypt
- Fourth place: Cape Verde

Tournament statistics
- Matches played: 4
- Goals scored: 4 (1 per match)
- Attendance: 13,834 (3,459 per match)
- Top scorer: (Uzbekistan) Oston Urunov (2 goals)

The 2025 Al Ain International Cup was an international friendly football tournament held between 13 and 18 November 2025 in Al Ain, United Arab Emirates, with the participation of four teams: Cape Verde, Egypt, Iran and Uzbekistan. Uzbekistan won the title after defeating Iran in the final on penalties following a draw at the end of the match.

== Teams ==
The following teams participated for the tournament; they had all previously qualified for the 2026 FIFA World Cup.

Country	Confederation	Manager	FIFA ranking at start of event
Cape Verde	CAF	(Cape Verde) Bubista	71
Egypt	CAF	(Egypt) Hossam Hassan	32
Iran	AFC	(Iran) Amir Ghalenoei	21
Uzbekistan	AFC	(Italy) Fabio Cannavaro	55

== Venue ==
All four matches was played at the Hazza bin Zayed Stadium in Al Ain.

Al Ain	2025 Al Ain International Cup is located in United Arab Emirates
Hazza bin Zayed Stadium	2025 Al Ain International Cup is located in United Arab Emirates
24°14′44.14″N 55°42′59.7″E	2025 Al Ain International Cup is located in United Arab Emirates
Capacity: 25,053	2025 Al Ain International Cup is located in United Arab Emirates

== Results ==
All times are local, GST (UTC+4).

=== Bracket ===
Semi-finals
13 November – Al Ain
Iran (p)	0 (5)
Cape Verde	0 (4)
14 November – Al Ain
Uzbekistan	2
Egypt	0

Final
18 November – Al Ain
Iran	0 (3)
Uzbekistan (p)	0 (4)
3rd place match
17 November – Al Ain
Cape Verde	1 (0)
Egypt (p)	1 (2)

=== Semi-finals ===
13 November 2025
17:00

Iran	0–0	Cape Verde
	Report
Penalties
Noorafkan (penalty scored); Alipour (penalty scored); Mohebi (penalty scored); Ezatolahi (penalty scored); Taremi (penalty scored)	5–4	(penalty scored) Rodrigues; (penalty scored) Diney; (penalty scored) Moreira; (penalty missed) Duarte; (penalty scored) Arcanjo

Hazza bin Zayed Stadium, Al Ain
Attendance: 634
Referee: Mohamed Al-Harmoodi (United Arab Emirates)

14 November 2025
17:00

Uzbekistan	2–0	Egypt
Urunov 4', 43'	Report

Hazza bin Zayed Stadium, Al Ain
Attendance: 6,200
Referee: Ahmed Eisa Darwish (United Arab Emirates)

=== Third place match ===
17 November 2025
17:00

Cape Verde	1–1	Egypt
Rodrigues 7' (pen.)	Report	Marmoush 57'
Penalties
Diney (penalty missed); Monteiro (penalty missed); Pina (penalty missed); Mendes (penalty missed)	0–2	(penalty missed) Marmoush; (penalty scored) Abdelmaguid; (penalty scored) Hamdy; (penalty missed) Faisal

Hazza bin Zayed Stadium, Al Ain
Attendance: 2,300
Referee: Rawdha Al Mansoori (United Arab Emirates)

=== Final ===
18 November 2025
17:00

Iran	0–0	Uzbekistan
	Report
Penalties
Noorafkan (penalty scored); Ghorbani (penalty scored); Mohebi (penalty missed); Hosseini (penalty scored); Mohammadi (penalty missed)	3–4	(penalty scored) Shomurodov; (penalty missed) Iskanderov; (penalty scored) Abdullaev; (penalty scored) Ashurmatov; (penalty scored) Mozgovoy

Hazza bin Zayed Stadium, Al Ain
Attendance: 4,700
Referee: Ali Al-Naqbi (United Arab Emirates)

== Goalscorers ==
There were 4 goals scored in 4 matches, for an average of 1 goal per match.

2 goals

- (Uzbekistan) Oston Urunov

1 goal

- (Cape Verde) Garry Rodrigues
- (Egypt) Omar Marmoush
