= 1957 African Cup of Nations squads =

Below is a list of squads used in the 1957 African Cup of Nations.

== Egypt ==
Coach: (Egypt) Mourad Fahmy

No.	Pos.	Player	Date of birth (age)	Caps	Goals	Club
	GK	Ali Bakr				(Egyptian Football Association) Zamalek
	GK	Brascos	10 January 1931 (aged 26)			(Egyptian Football Association) El-Qanah
	GK	Abdel Galil Hemaida	28 December 1923 (aged 33)			(Egyptian Football Association) Al-Ahly
	DF	Mosaad Daoud				(Egyptian Football Association) El-Olympi
	DF	El-Sayed El-Arabi				(Egyptian Football Association) Tram SC
	DF	Abdou-Wahab Selim	1 January 1936 (aged 21)			(Egyptian Football Association) Al-Masry
	DF	Mohammed El-Zangiri				(Egyptian Football Association) El-Sekka El-Hadid
	DF	Tariq Selim	15 July 1937 (aged 19)			(Egyptian Football Association) Al-Ahly
	DF	Hanafy Bastan (captain)	6 December 1923 (aged 33)			(Egyptian Football Association) Zamalek
	DF	Awad Abdel-Rahman	28 May 1920 (aged 36)			(Egyptian Football Association) Ismaily
	MF	Bidho				(Egyptian Football Association) Ismaily
	MF	Ibrahim Tawfik				(Egyptian Football Association) Tanta SC
	MF	Samir Qotb	16 March 1938 (aged 18)			(Egyptian Football Association) Zamalek
	MF	Rifaat El-Fanagily	1 May 1936 (aged 20)			(Egyptian Football Association) Al-Ahly
	MF	Nour El-Dali	24 October 1928 (aged 28)			(Egyptian Football Association) Zamalek
	MF	Hamza Abdel-Moula				(Egyptian Football Association) Tersana
	MF	Helmi Abou El-Maati				(Egyptian Football Association) Al-Ahly
	MF	Daoud Soliman				(Egyptian Football Association)
	MF	Hassan Adam				(Egyptian Football Association)
	FW	Hamdi Abdel-Fattah				(Egyptian Football Association) Tersana
	FW	Alaa El-Hamouly	4 July 1930 (aged 26)			(Egyptian Football Association) Zamalek
	FW	Ad-Diba	17 November 1927 (aged 29)			(Egyptian Football Association) Al-Ittihad Alexandria
	FW	Raafat Attia	6 February 1934 (aged 23)			(Egyptian Football Association) Al-Ittihad Alexandria

== Ethiopia ==
Coach: (Ethiopia) Moustafa Zewde

No.	Pos.	Player	Date of birth (age)	Caps	Goals	Club
	GK	Gila-Michael Tekle Mariam	1936			(Ethiopian Football Federation) Adulis Club
	MF	Wendimu Feyessa				(Ethiopian Football Federation) Mechal SC
	DF	Adale Tekle Selassie				(Ethiopian Football Federation) Saint George SC
	DF	Adamu Alemu				(Ethiopian Football Federation) Mechal SC
	DF	Ayele Tessema				(Ethiopian Football Federation) Mechal SC
	DF	Girmay Fikre Mariam				(Ethiopian Football Federation) GS Hamasien
	DF	Amanuel Kidanemariam				(Ethiopian Football Federation) GS Hamasien
	DF	Mohammed Ibrahim				(Ethiopian Football Federation) GS Hamasien
	DF	Mekouria Kebede Asfaw				(Ethiopian Football Federation)
	MF	Samuel Zewde				(Ethiopian Football Federation) Saint George SC
	MF	Kebede Metaferia				(Ethiopian Football Federation) Mechal SC
	MF	Yonas Berhane				(Ethiopian Football Federation) Mechal SC
	FW	Netsere Woldeselassie				(Ethiopian Football Federation) Saint George SC
	FW	Asefaw Berhe				(Ethiopian Football Federation) GS Hamasien
	FW	Tekeste Goitom				(Ethiopian Football Federation) GS Hamasien
	FW	Abraha Bayrou				(Ethiopian Football Federation) Omedla FC

== Sudan ==
Coach: (Hungary) József Háda

No.	Pos.	Player	Date of birth (age)	Caps	Goals	Club
	GK	Faisal Alsayed Steve	1931 (aged 26)			(Sudan Football Association) Al-Merreikh
	MF	Osman Alwatheg				(Sudan Football Association) Al Neel Al-Khartoum
	DF	Osman Al-Deim				(Sudan Football Association) Al-Hilal
	DF	Burai Saleem				(Sudan Football Association) Al Neel Al-Khartoum
	DF	Ebrahim Kabir				(Sudan Football Association) Al Ahli Khartoum
	FW	Aljak Ajab (captain)	1927 (aged 30)			(Sudan Football Association) Al-Ittihad Bahri
	DF	Mansour Ramadan				(Sudan Football Association) Al-Merreikh
	DF	Alhadi Seyam				(Sudan Football Association) Al-Hilal
	MF	Sayed Mustafa				(Sudan Football Association) Al-Ahli Wad Madani
	MF	Sery Muhamed Ali				(Sudan Football Association) Al-Merreikh
	MF	Abdullah Jumaa Zarkan				(Sudan Football Association) Al-Mourada
	MF	Boraî Bashir	1932 (aged 24)			(Sudan Football Association) Al-Merreikh
	FW	Hassan Abu Al-Aila				(Sudan Football Association) Al-Merreikh
	FW	Siddiq Manzul	1929 (aged 28)			(Sudan Football Association) Al-Hilal
	MF	Omer Moscow				(Sudan Football Association) Al-Mourada
