= List of international goals scored by Mohamed Salah =

Wikipedia list article

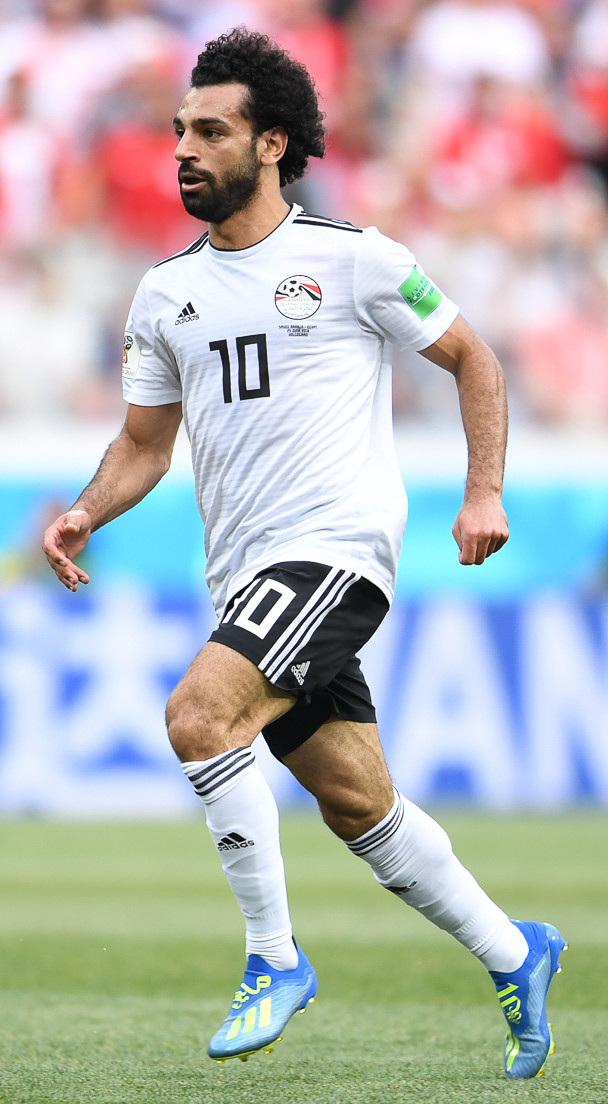
Salah with Egypt at the 2018 FIFA World Cup

Mohamed Salah is an Egyptian footballer who has since represented the Egypt national football team as a winger since 2011. He has scored 70 goals in 124 matches, making him the top scorer for Egypt. He surpassed Hossam Hassan when he scored his 69th and 70th goals on 13 November 2026 against Malawi.

With 70 goals for Egypt, Salah is the third top international goalscorer for an African country, behind only Malawi's Kinnah Phiri and Zambia's Godfrey Chitalu.

== Goals ==
As of match played 17 November 2026. Egypt score listed first, score column indicates score after each Salah goal.

List of international goals scored by Mohamed Salah
No.	Date	Venue	Cap	Opponent	Score	Result	Competition	Ref.
1	8 October 2011	Cairo International Stadium, Cairo, Egypt	2	Niger	2–0	3–0	2012 Africa Cup of Nations qualification	
2	27 February 2012	Thani bin Jassim Stadium, Doha, Qatar	3	Kenya	1–0	5–0	Friendly	
3	29 March 2012	Khartoum Stadium, Khartoum, Sudan	6	Uganda	1–1	2–1	Friendly	
4	31 March 2012	Khartoum Stadium, Khartoum, Sudan	7	Chad	1–0	4–0	Friendly	
5	22 May 2012	Al-Merrikh Stadium, Omdurman, Sudan	10	Togo	2–0	3–0	Friendly	
6	22 May 2012	Al-Merrikh Stadium, Omdurman, Sudan	10	Togo	3–0	3–0	Friendly	
7	10 June 2012	Stade du 28 Septembre, Conakry, Guinea	12	Guinea	3–2	3–2	2014 FIFA World Cup qualification	
8	15 June 2012	Borg El Arab Stadium, Alexandria, Egypt	13	Central African Republic	2–1	2–3	2013 Africa Cup of Nations qualification	
9	6 February 2013	Vicente Calderón, Madrid, Spain	18	Chile	1–2	1–2	Friendly	
10	22 March 2013	Borg El Arab Stadium, Alexandria, Egypt	19	Swaziland	2–0	10–0 (Note: The match against Swaziland in 2013, in which Salah scored twice, is not considered official by FIFA, but it is recognised by the Egyptian Football Association. This is why the EFA credits him with 70 goals for Egypt while FIFA only credits him with 68.)	Friendly	
11	22 March 2013	Borg El Arab Stadium, Alexandria, Egypt	19	Swaziland	3–0	10–0	Friendly	
12	9 June 2013	National Sports Stadium, Harare, Zimbabwe	21	Zimbabwe	2–1	4–2	2014 FIFA World Cup qualification	
13	9 June 2013	National Sports Stadium, Harare, Zimbabwe	21	Zimbabwe	3–1	4–2	2014 FIFA World Cup qualification	
14	9 June 2013	National Sports Stadium, Harare, Zimbabwe	21	Zimbabwe	4–2	4–2	2014 FIFA World Cup qualification	
15	16 June 2013	Estádio da Machava, Maputo, Mozambique	22	Mozambique	1–0	1–0	2014 FIFA World Cup qualification	
16	14 August 2013	El Gouna Stadium, El Gouna, Egypt	23	Uganda	2–0	3–0	Friendly	
17	10 September 2013	El Gouna Stadium, El Gouna, Egypt	24	Guinea	3–2	4–2	2014 FIFA World Cup qualification	
18	5 March 2014	Tivoli Stadion Tirol, Innsbruck, Austria	28	Bosnia and Herzegovina	2–0	2–0	Friendly	
19	30 May 2014	Estadio Nacional Julio Martínez Prádanos, Santiago, Chile	29	Chile	1–0	2–3	Friendly	
20	10 October 2014	Botswana National Stadium, Gaborone, Botswana	33	Botswana	2–0	2–0	2015 Africa Cup of Nations qualification	
21	15 October 2014	Cairo International Stadium, Cairo, Egypt	34	Botswana	2–0	2–0	2015 Africa Cup of Nations qualification	
22	19 November 2014	Mustapha Ben Jannet Stadium, Monastir, Tunisia	36	Tunisia	1–0	1–2	2015 Africa Cup of Nations qualification	
23	14 June 2015	Borg El Arab Stadium, Alexandria, Egypt	38	Tanzania	3–0	3–0	2017 Africa Cup of Nations qualification	
24	6 September 2015	Stade Omnisports Idriss Mahamat Ouya, N'Djamena, Chad	39	Chad	3–1	5–1	2017 Africa Cup of Nations qualification	
25	25 March 2016	Ahmadu Bello Stadium, Kaduna, Nigeria	41	Nigeria	1–1	1–1	2017 Africa Cup of Nations qualification	
26	4 June 2016	National Stadium, Dar es Salaam, Tanzania	43	Tanzania	1–0	2–0	2017 Africa Cup of Nations qualification	
27	4 June 2016	National Stadium, Dar es Salaam, Tanzania	43	Tanzania	2–0	2–0	2017 Africa Cup of Nations qualification	
28	9 October 2016	Stade Municipal de Kintélé, Brazzaville, Republic of the Congo	45	Congo	1–1	2–1	2018 FIFA World Cup qualification	
29	13 November 2016	Borg El Arab Stadium, Alexandria, Egypt	46	Ghana	1–0	2–0	2018 FIFA World Cup qualification	
30	25 January 2017	Stade de Port-Gentil, Port-Gentil, Gabon	50	Ghana	1–0	1–0	2017 Africa Cup of Nations	
31	1 February 2017	Stade de l'Amitié, Libreville, Gabon	52	Burkina Faso	1–0	1–1 (a.e.t.) (4–3 p)	2017 Africa Cup of Nations	
32	5 September 2017	Borg El Arab Stadium, Alexandria, Egypt	56	Uganda	1–0	1–0	2018 FIFA World Cup qualification	
33	8 October 2017	Borg El Arab Stadium, Alexandria, Egypt	57	Congo	1–0	2–1	2018 FIFA World Cup qualification	
34	8 October 2017	Borg El Arab Stadium, Alexandria, Egypt	57	Congo	2–1	2–1	2018 FIFA World Cup qualification	
35	23 March 2018	Letzigrund, Zurich, Switzerland	58	Portugal	1–0	1–2	Friendly	
36	19 June 2018	Krestovsky Stadium, Saint Petersburg, Russia	59	Russia	1–3	1–3	2018 FIFA World Cup	
37	25 June 2018	Volgograd Arena, Volgograd, Russia	60	Saudi Arabia	1–0	1–2	2018 FIFA World Cup	
38	8 September 2018	Borg El Arab Stadium, Alexandria, Egypt	61	Niger	3–0	6–0	2019 Africa Cup of Nations qualification	
39	8 September 2018	Borg El Arab Stadium, Alexandria, Egypt	61	Niger	5–0	6–0	2019 Africa Cup of Nations qualification	
40	12 October 2018	Al Salam Stadium, Cairo, Egypt	62	Eswatini	4–0	4–1	2019 Africa Cup of Nations qualification	
41	16 November 2018	Borg El Arab Stadium, Alexandria, Egypt	63	Tunisia	3–2	3–2	2019 Africa Cup of Nations qualification	
42	26 June 2019	Cairo International Stadium, Cairo, Egypt	66	DR Congo	2–0	2–0	2019 Africa Cup of Nations	
43	30 June 2019	Cairo International Stadium, Cairo, Egypt	67	Uganda	1–0	2–0	2019 Africa Cup of Nations	
44	29 March 2021	Cairo International Stadium, Cairo, Egypt	70	Comoros	3–0	4–0	2021 Africa Cup of Nations qualification	
45	29 March 2021	Cairo International Stadium, Cairo, Egypt	70	Comoros	4–0	4–0	2021 Africa Cup of Nations qualification	
46	15 January 2022	Roumdé Adjia Stadium, Garoua, Cameroon	77	Guinea-Bissau	1–0	1–0	2021 Africa Cup of Nations	
47	30 January 2022	Ahmadou Ahidjo Stadium, Yaoundé, Cameroon	80	Morocco	1–1	2–1 (a.e.t.)	2021 Africa Cup of Nations	
48	23 September 2022	Alexandria Stadium, Alexandria, Egypt	86	Niger	1–0	3–0	Friendly	
49	23 September 2022	Alexandria Stadium, Alexandria, Egypt	86	Niger	3–0	3–0	Friendly	
50	24 March 2023	30 June Stadium, Cairo, Egypt	88	Malawi	1–0	2–0	2023 Africa Cup of Nations qualification	
51	28 March 2023	Bingu National Stadium, Lilongwe, Malawi	89	Malawi	3–0	4–0	2023 Africa Cup of Nations qualification	
52	16 November 2023	Cairo International Stadium, Cairo, Egypt	94	Djibouti	1–0	6–0	2026 FIFA World Cup qualification	
53	16 November 2023	Cairo International Stadium, Cairo, Egypt	94	Djibouti	2–0	6–0	2026 FIFA World Cup qualification	
54	16 November 2023	Cairo International Stadium, Cairo, Egypt	94	Djibouti	3–0	6–0	2026 FIFA World Cup qualification	
55	16 November 2023	Cairo International Stadium, Cairo, Egypt	94	Djibouti	4–0	6–0	2026 FIFA World Cup qualification	
56	14 January 2024	Felix Houphouet Boigny Stadium, Abidjan, Ivory Coast	97	Mozambique	2–2	2–2	2023 Africa Cup of Nations	
57	10 June 2024	Estádio 24 de Setembro, Bissau, Guinea-Bissau	100	Guinea-Bissau	1–1	1–1	2026 FIFA World Cup qualification	
58	10 September 2024	Obed Itani Chilume Stadium, Francistown, Botswana	102	Botswana	3–0	4–0	2025 Africa Cup of Nations qualification	
59	11 October 2024	Cairo International Stadium, Cairo, Egypt	103	Mauritania	2–0	2–0	2025 Africa Cup of Nations qualification	
60	21 March 2025	Larbi Zaouli Stadium, Casablanca, Morocco	104	Ethiopia	1–0	2–0	2026 FIFA World Cup qualification	
61	5 September 2025	Cairo International Stadium, Cairo, Egypt	106	Ethiopia	1–0	2–0	2026 FIFA World Cup qualification	
62	8 October 2025	Larbi Zaouli Stadium, Casablanca, Morocco	108	Djibouti	2–0	3–0	2026 FIFA World Cup qualification	
63	8 October 2025	Larbi Zaouli Stadium, Casablanca, Morocco	108	Djibouti	3–0	3–0	2026 FIFA World Cup qualification	
64	22 December 2025	Adrar Stadium, Agadir, Morocco	110	Zimbabwe	2–1	2–1	2025 Africa Cup of Nations	
65	26 December 2025	Adrar Stadium, Agadir, Morocco	111	South Africa	1–0	1–0	2025 Africa Cup of Nations	
66	5 January 2026	Adrar Stadium, Agadir, Morocco	112	Benin	3–1	3–1 (a.e.t.)	2025 Africa Cup of Nations	
67	10 January 2026	Adrar Stadium, Agadir, Morocco	113	Ivory Coast	3–1	3–2	2025 Africa Cup of Nations	
68	21 June 2026	BC Place, Vancouver, Canada	118	New Zealand	2–1	3–1	2026 FIFA World Cup	
69	13 November 2026	Cairo International Stadium, Cairo, Egypt	123	Malawi	4–0	5–0	2027 Africa Cup of Nations qualification	
70	13 November 2026	Cairo International Stadium, Cairo, Egypt	123	Malawi	5–0	5–0	2027 Africa Cup of Nations qualification	

== Hat-tricks ==
No.	Opponent	Goals	Score	Venue	Competition	Date
1	Zimbabwe	3 – (2–1', 3–1', 4–2')	4–2	National Sports Stadium, Harare, Zimbabwe	2014 FIFA World Cup qualification	9 June 2013
2	Djibouti	4 – (1–0', 2–0', 3–0', 4–0)	6–0	Cairo International Stadium, Cairo, Egypt	2026 FIFA World Cup qualification	16 November 2023

=== International ===
As of match played 17 November 2026

Appearances and goals by national team and year
National team	Year	Apps	Goals
Egypt	2011	2	1
Egypt	2012	15	7
Egypt	2013	10	9
Egypt	2014	9	5
Egypt	2015	4	2
Egypt	2016	6	5
Egypt	2017	11	5
Egypt	2018	6	7
Egypt	2019	5	2
Egypt	2020	0	0
Egypt	2021	7	2
Egypt	2022	12	4
Egypt	2023	8	6
Egypt	2024	8	4
Egypt	2025	8	6
Egypt	2026	13	5
Total		124	70

Goals by competitions
Competitions	Appearances	Goals
FIFA World Cup	7	3
FIFA World Cup qualification	30	20
Africa Cup of Nations	26	11
Africa Cup of Nations qualification	29	14
Friendly	35	22
Total	124	70
