= Mourad Fahmy =

Egyptian footballer and manager (1910–1983)

Personal information
- Date of birth: July 1, 1910
- Place of birth: Cairo, Egypt
- Date of death: September 1, 1983 (aged 73)
- Place of death: Abidjan, Ivory Coast
- Position: Defender

Senior career*
Years	Team	Apps	(Gls)
- Al Ahly SC

Managerial career
- 1955–1958: Egypt
- 1961–1983: CAF (General secretary)
Medal record
Men's Football
Representing Egypt (as manager)
Africa Cup of Nations
Winner	1957 Sudan
- * Club domestic league appearances and goals

Mourad Fahmy (Arabic: مراد فهمي; 1 July 1910 – 1 September 1983) was an Egyptian football player and coach who helped Egypt to their first African Cup of Nations victory.

== Biography ==
Mourad Fahmy was a football player for Al Ahly. Between 1955 and 1958 Fahmy was coach of the Egyptian national football team. He led Egypt to the inaugural African Cup of Nations in 1957. After retiring from coaching, Mourad Fahmy became a founding member of the Confederation of African Football (CAF). Fahmy was the general secretary of CAF between 1961 and 1982. Fahmy was also minister of Agriculture under President Nasser. Mourad Fahmy died in 1983 whilst attending a CAF meeting in Abidjan.

== Personal life ==
Mourad Fahmy was grandfather to Amr Fahmy, who served as the General-Secretary of the Confederation of African Football from 2017 to 2019.

== Honours ==
Egypt

- African Cup of Nations: 1957
