= Dimitri Tadić =

Yugoslav football manager

Managerial career
- Years: Team
- 1966–1969: Kuwait
- 1976: United Arab Emirates

Dimitri Tadić was a Yugoslav football manager who coached the national teams of Kuwait and the United Arab Emirates. While coaching the UAE at the 1976 Gulf Cup, Tadić suffered a heart attack and was replaced by local coach Jumaa Ghareeb. The team did not win any of their games in the competition.
