= Stella (surname) =

Stella is a surname meaning star in Latin and Italian. Notable persons with the surname include:

== Artists ==
- Fermo Stella (1490s–1560s), Italian painter
- François Stella (1563–1605), French Baroque painter
- Frank Stella (1936–2024), American painter, sculptor and printmaker
- Giacomo Stella (fl. 1572–1644), Italian Renaissance painter
- Guglielmo Stella (1828–1888), Italian Realist painter and writer
- Guido Balsamo Stella (1882–1941), Italian painter and engraver
- Jacques Stella (1596–1657), French painter
- Joseph Stella (1877–1946), American painter

== Athletes ==
- Aldo Stella (footballer) (born 1930), Italian goalkeeper
- Aldo Stella (skier) (born 1943), Italian ski mountaineer and skier
- Francesco Stella (footballer), (born 1991) is an Australian footballer
- Gianfranco Stella (born 1938), Italian ski mountaineer and skier
- Harry Stella (1916–1997), American football player and United States Army officer
- Noemi Stella (born 1997), Italian race walker
- Tommy La Stella (born 1989), American baseball player

== Musicians and composers ==
- Andrea Stella (fl. 1620s), an Italian priest and composer
- Antonietta Stella (1929–2022), Italian soprano
- Carlos Stella (born 1961), Argentine composer
- Lennon Stella (born 1999), Canadian singer and actress
- Maisy Stella (born 2003), from Canadian country music duo The Stellas
- Scipione Stella (died 1622), Neapolitan composer
- Simone Stella (born 1981), Italian harpsichordist and organist

== Religion ==
- Aldo Maria Lazzarín Stella (1926–2010), bishop of the Roman Catholic Apostolic Vicariate of Aisén, Chile
- Beniamino Stella (born 1941), Italian cardinal
- Marcello Stella (died 1642), Roman Catholic Bishop of Isernia
- Tommaso Stella (died 1566), Roman Catholic Bishop of Capodistria, Lavello, and Salpi

== Other people ==
- Aldo Stella (disambiguation), several people with the name
- Andrea Stella (engineer), an engineer currently working in Formula One
- Francesco Stella (1862–1940), Italian set designer, artist-painter, and decorator
- Franco Stella (born 24 April 1943), Italian architect
- Javier Arias Stella (1924–2020), Peruvian pathologist who discovered the eponymous "Arias-Stella reaction"
- Lucius Arruntius Stella (fl. c. 100AD), Roman senator
- Maria Stella (1773–1843), self-styled legitimate daughter of Louis Philip II, Duke of Orleans
- Martina Stella (born 1984), Italian actress
- Rebecca Stella (born 1985), Swedish singer, designer, model and blogger
- Roberto Stella (c. 1953–2020), Italian general practitioner
- Sebastien Stella (born 1971), French choreographer and director

== See also ==
- Stella (disambiguation)
- Stella (given name), including a list of people bearing the name
