= Starla (disambiguation) =

Starla is a 2019 Philippine television drama fantasy series broadcast by ABS-CBN.

Starla may also refer to:

== People ==
Starla is a female American given name. People with this name include:

- Starla Brodie (1955–2014), American poker player, World Series of Poker champion
- Starla Teddergreen (born 1979), American cyclist
- Molly Holly (born 1977), American pro-wrestler, with the ring-name Starla Saxton

== Characters ==
- Starla, a fictional character from the Philippine TV show Starla
- Starla, a fictional character from the 2010s U.S. animated TV show Blaze and the Monster Machines
- Starla, a fictional character from the U.S. TV show Arrested Development
- Starla, a fictional character from the 2017 Indonesian film Love Letter for Starla
- Starla, a fictional character from the 1990s U.S. animated TV show Starla and the Jewel Riders
- Starla Cresswell, a fictional character from the UK serial comic Bunty
- Starla Grady, a fictional character from the 2002 film Slap Her... She's French
- Starla Grant, a fictional character from the 2006 film Slither (2006 film)
- Starla Gutsmandottir, a fictional character from U.S. animated TV show Regular Show
- Starla Monica Brahmantya Himawan, a fictional character from the 2020s Indonesian TV show Cinta Setelah Cinta

== See also ==
- Starla and the Jewel Riders, a 1990s U.S. animated TV show
- Starla and Sons, an improv group at Brown University, Providence, Rhode Island, USA
- Stella (given name), which sometimes is rendered "Starla"
- Stella (disambiguation)
- Stellar (disambiguation)
