= Stela (disambiguation) =

Stela may refer to:

- Latinised singular stela of stele, a kind of stone monument
- Satellite Television Extension and Localism Act of 2010
- Stela (video game), a 2019 Canadian game
- Stela (film), a 1990 Croatian film
- Stela (name), a Romanian feminine given name

== See also ==
- Stella (disambiguation)
