= Stella =

Stella or STELLA may refer to:

== Art, entertainment, and media ==
=== Films ===
- Stella (1921 film), directed by Edwin J. Collins
- Stella (1943 film), with Zully Moreno
- Stella (1950 film), with Ann Sheridan and Victor Mature
- Stella (1955 film), directed by Michael Cacoyannis, starring Melina Mercouri
- Stella (1976 film), written and directed by Luigi Cozzi
- Stella (1983 film), directed by Laurent Heynemann; see Jean-Louis Bauer
- Stella (1990 film), starring Bette Midler
- Stella (2008 film), directed by Sylvie Verheyde
- Stella. A Life., 2023 German film

=== Literature ===
- Stella, a novel attributed to Haitian author Emeric Bergeaud
- Stella, a 1951 novel by Jan de Hartog, made into the 1958 film The Key
- Stella (Norwegian magazine), a Norwegian lifestyle magazine
- Stella (Swedish magazine), a Swedish science fiction magazine
- Stella (play), 1806 tragic play by Johann Wolfgang von Goethe
- Stella, a magazine supplement for The Sunday Telegraph
- Stella Prize, an Australian literary prize

=== Music ===
- Stella (band), a Finnish rock-pop band
- The Stellas, a Canadian country music duo
- Stella (album), a 1985 album by Swiss band Yello
- "Stella" (song), by All Time Low
- "Stella", a song by Ida Maria from Fortress Round My Heart
- Stella, a 2006 album by Italian band Uzeda

=== Television ===
- Stella (Croatian TV series), a 2013 TV series starring Amar Bukvić
- Stella (British TV series), a comedy drama set in South Wales
- Stella (American TV series), a comedy program by the Stella troupe
- Stella's Big Party, episode in the sixth season of Winx Club

=== Other uses in art, entertainment, and media ===
- Stella (comedy group), a comedy troupe consisting of Michael Showalter, Michael Ian Black and David Wain
- Stella, a 2021 card game derived from Dixit

== Companies and product names ==
- Stella (beer), an Egyptian beer
- Stella (bicycle company), a French bicycle manufacturer
- Stella cherry, a sweet cherry cultivar
- Stella (guitar), a brand of a guitar
- STELLA (language courses), online language courses
- Stella (scooter), a vintage scooter brand
- Stella (solar vehicles), three iterations of a practical solar powered racecar
- Stella Artois, a Belgian beer
- Stella Cheese, a division of Saputo Incorporated
- Stella D'oro, an American brand of cookies
- Subaru Stella, an automobile
- Cagiva Stella, an underbone produced by Italian motorcycle manufacturer Cagiva

== Computing and technology ==
- Stella (emulator), multiplatform Atari 2600 game-console emulator
- STELLA (programming language), a simulation modeling tool developed by Barry Richmond
- Stella (software), polyhedra modeling software
- Stella, a code name for the Atari 2600 game console
- Stella, the IBM Blue Gene-L supercomputer used with the LOFAR radio telescope project

== Geographic features ==
- Corno Stella, a mountain of Lombardy, Italy
- Lake Stella, a lake in Alger County, Michigan, U.S.
- Monte Stella (disambiguation), several Italian mountains
- Pizzo Stella, a mountain of Lombardy, Italy
- Stella Creek, in the Argentine Islands, Wilheim Archipelago
- Stella Point, on Mount Kilimanjaro, Tanzania

== People ==
- Stella (given name), including a list of people and fictional characters bearing the name
- Stella (surname), including a list of people and fictional characters bearing the name
- Stella (singer) (born 1980), Singaporean singer
- Stella (Namibian singer), Stella Tjazuko !Naruses, Namibian singer

== Places ==
=== England ===
- Stella, Gateshead, a village in Tyne and Wear
- Stella power stations, a demolished pair of coal-fired power stations in Tyne and Wear

=== Italy ===
- Stella, Liguria, a town in Liguria
- Stella Cilento, a town in Campania
- Stella (Naples), a neighbourhood
- Monte Stella (disambiguation), several locations

=== United States ===
- Stella, Kentucky, an unincorporated community in Calloway County
- Stella, Missouri, a village in Newton County
- Stella, Nebraska, a village in Richardson County
- Stella, North Carolina, an unincorporated community in Carteret County
- Stella, Ohio, an unincorporated community in Vinton County
- Stella, Fayette County, Texas, a ghost town
- Stella, Harris County, Texas, a former unincorporated area incorporated into Houston, Texas
- Stella, Washington, an unincorporated community in Cowlitz County
- Stella, Wisconsin, a town in Oneida County

=== Elsewhere ===
- Stella, South Africa, a town in North West Province
- Stella, Ontario, a village on Amherst Island, Ontario, Canada
- Stella-Plage, a seaside resort in northern France
- Stella, Puerto Rico, a commune in Rincón
- Stellaland or Stella Land, a Boer republic in South Africa's North West Province

== Ships ==
- Stella (yacht), a class of yacht designed in the UK by Kim Holman in 1959
- SS Stella, various steamships

== Other uses ==
- Stella (crater), on the Moon
- Stella (satellite), a French geodetic satellite
- Stella (United States coin), a pattern gold coin minted from 1879–80 with a face value of four dollars ($4)
- Stella Award, comedy prize now known as Melbourne International Comedy Festival Award
- Stella Award, given to people who file ridiculous lawsuits for huge financial gain, based on the website by Randy Cassingham
- Stella Club d'Adjamé, an association football club based in Abidjan, Ivory Coast
- Stella d'Italia, a five-pointed star symbolizing Italy
- Stella Polaris, the brightest star in the constellation Ursa Minor

== See also ==
- March 2017 North American blizzard, also known as Winter Storm Stella
- Stela (disambiguation)
- Sella (surname)
- Stell (surname)
- Stella Maris (disambiguation)
- Stellar (disambiguation)
- Stellate cell, any neuron that has a star-like shape
- Starla (disambiguation)
