= Solomon Receiving the Queen of Sheba =

Painting by Jacques Stella

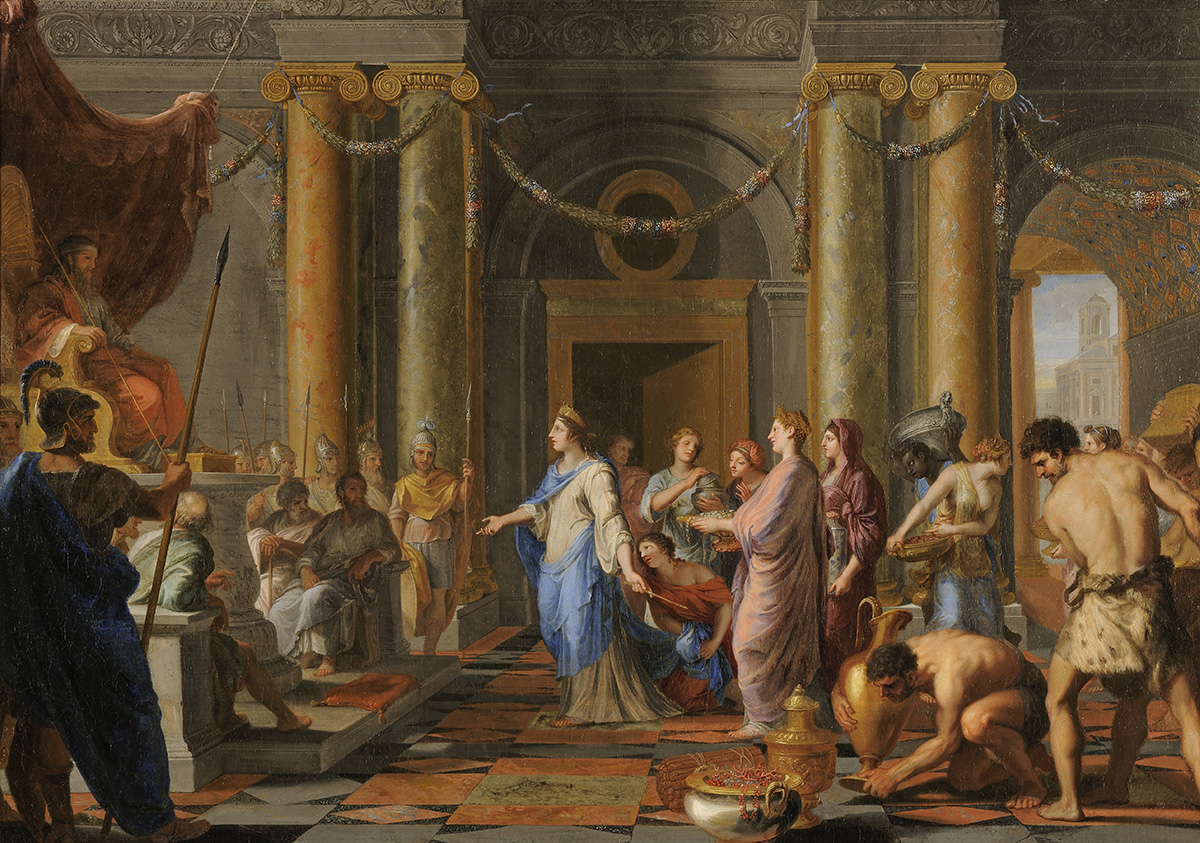
Solomon Receiving the Queen of Sheba (c. 1650) by Jacques Stella

Solomon Receiving the Queen of Sheba is a c. 1650 painting by Jacques Stella. It was acquired by the Museum of Fine Arts of Lyon in 1992, where it hangs with its pair Solomon Worshipping Idols.

== Sources ==
- Revue du Louvre [1992], (Acquisitions)
