= Aldo Stella =

Aldo Stella may refer to:

- Aldo Stella (historian) (1923–2007), Italian historian specialising in the Italian Anabaptist movement
- Aldo Stella (skier) (born 1943), Italian ski mountaineer and former cross-country skier
- Aldo Stella (footballer), Italian football goalkeeper
- it:Aldo Stella (born 1955), Italian actor
