= Françoise Bouzonnet Stella =

French copper engraver (1638–1691)

Françoise Bouzonnet Stella (1638-1691) was a French copper engraver and pastellist active in Paris during the latter half of the 17th century. Part of a family of woman engravers active in Paris including Claudine Bouzonnet-Stella and Antoinette Bouzonnet-Stella, she is primarily known for Livre de vases, a book of engravings of vases designed by her uncle, the painter Jacques Stella, executed in her sister's studio at the Louvre.

== Life ==
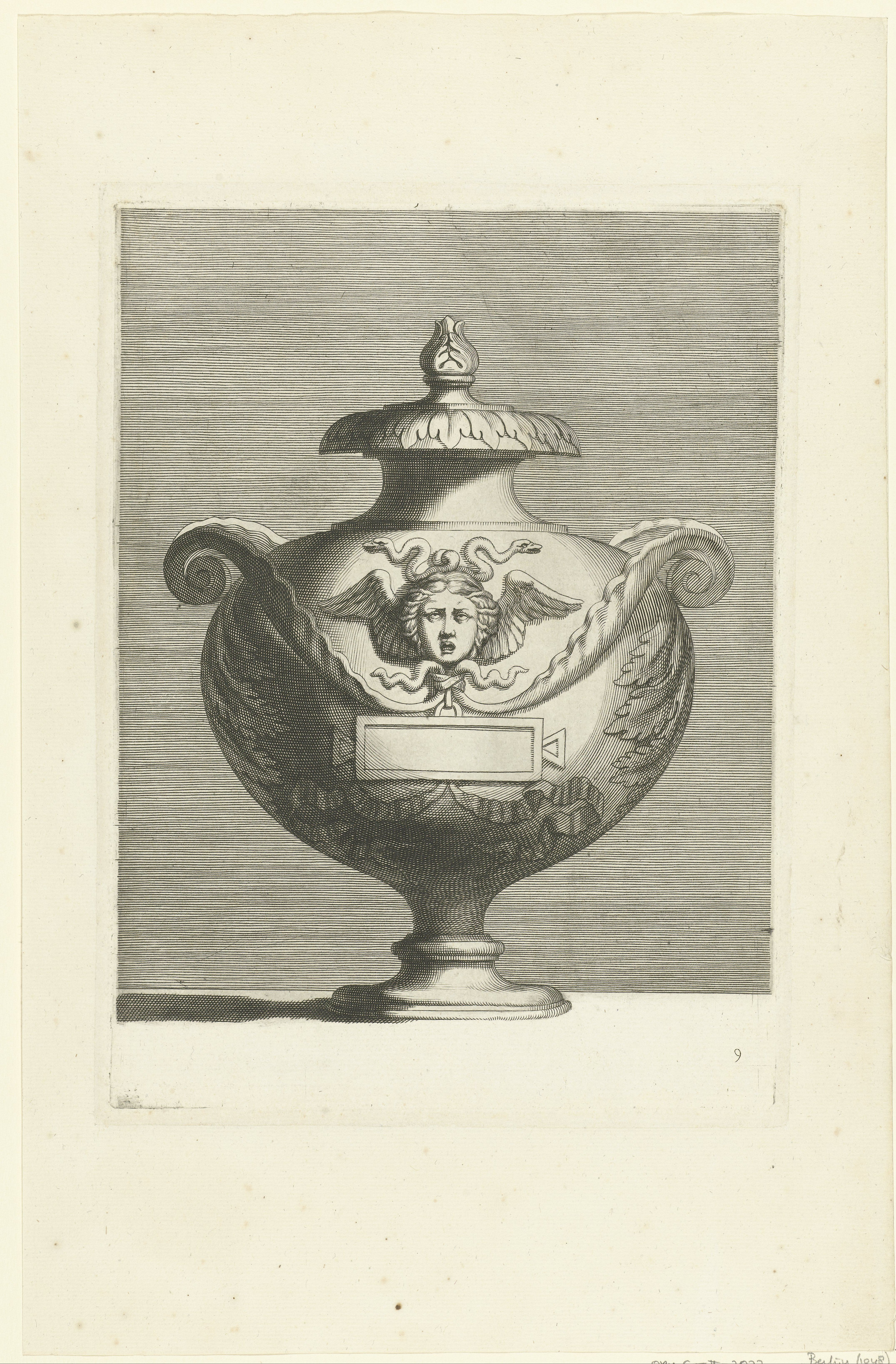
Engraving from Livre de Vases (Book of Vases)

Stella was born around December 1638 to Étienne Bouzonnet, a goldsmith, and Madeleine Stella, who was the sister of the painter Jacques Stella. Part of a family of artists, her siblings were the painter Antoine Bouzonnet-Stella and the engravers Claudine Bouzonnet-Stella and Antoinette Bouzonnet-Stella.

Around 1654, Françoise, her parents, and her older sister Claudine moved to Paris to collaborate with the painter Jacques Stella, Françoise's uncle. The family lived at Stella's apartments in the Galleries of the Louvre, which at this time functioned as residential and studio spaces for artists associated with the royal court.

Like her sisters, Françoise specialised in the art of burin engraving, particularly contributing to the dissemination of Jacques Stella’s designs. Unable to equal her sister Claudine in reputation, Françoise focused on contributing to her sister’s work and is recorded as working as her assistant.

Françoise Bouzonnet Stella died on 18 April 1691 in Claudine's apartments at the Louvre, with contemporary burial records stating her age as approximately forty. However, earlier records give her baptismal date as 12 December 1638, indicating her age at death as fifty-two. Stella was buried at Saint-Germain-l'Auxerrois.

== Works ==
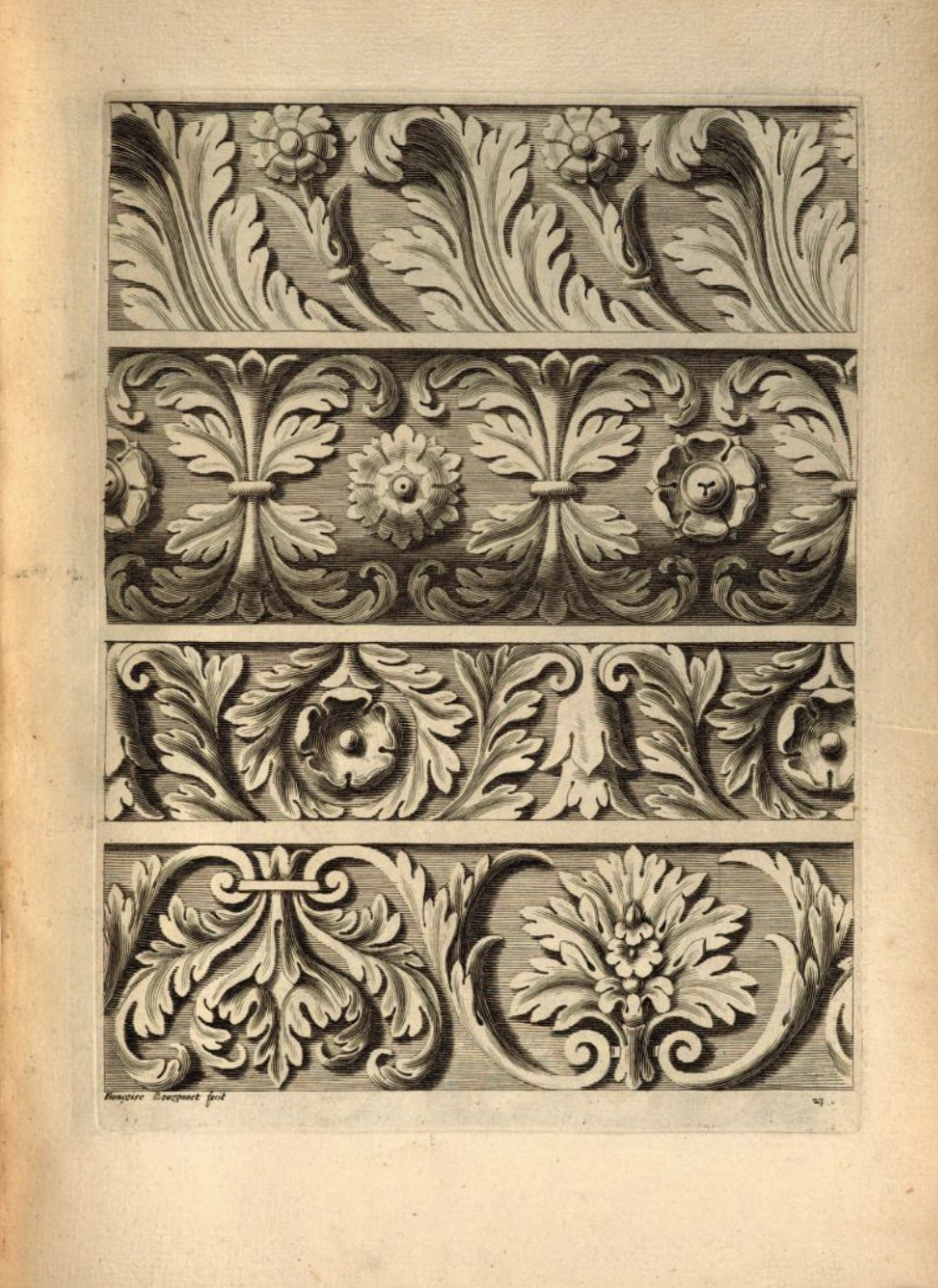
A print showing classical friezes with the inscription "Françoise Stella fecit" (Françoise Stella made this)

Stella is primarily known for her Livre de vases, inventé par M. Stella, Chevalier et peintre du Roy (1667), a folio of designs for decorative urns created by her uncle Jacques Stella. France's National Library also records the following works:

- Livre quatrième (1658)
- Livre premier (1655)
- La Vierge assise près de saint Joseph, tenant l’Enfant Jésus debout écrasant un serpent
- Descente de croix
- Livre troisième
- Le Retour d’Égypte
- Frises et dessins d’ornements inventés par Jacques Stella
- Une Vierge tenant Jésus, à qui saint Jean présente l’Ecce Agnus Dei, avec sainte Élisabeth et saint Joseph
- Sainte Geneviève en prière
- Notre-Dame de Pitié
- L’Enfant Jésus couché dans la crèche
- Une sainte Madeleine couchée dans sa grotte
- Divers ornements d’architecture recueillis et dessinés d’après l’antique
- La Vierge et sainte Élisabeth dans un paysage, avec un panier de fruits au premier plan
- Jésus apparaissant à la Vierge après la Résurrection
- La Vierge et sainte Élisabeth
- Saint François recevant les stigmates
- Une Vierge à mi-corps tenant Jésus mort
- Livre second
- Hérodiade accompagnée de sa mère portant la tête de saint Jean-Baptiste
- Un petit Jésus couché dans la crèche
- Recueil: Œuvre de Françoise Bouzonnet-Stella
