= Stella Walker =

Stella Walker may refer to:

- Stella Walker, a character from 2002 Scottish TV soap opera River City
- Stella Walker, a character from 2021 U.S. TV drama Walker (TV series)
- Stella Walker, a character from 1981 U.S. fantasy-comedy telefilm The Girl, the Gold Watch & Dynamite
- Stella Walker, a character from 1954 U.S. Western film The Forty-Niners
- Stella Walker, a character from 1934 U.S. mystery film The House of Mystery (1934 film)

== See also ==
- Stella (disambiguation)
- Walker (disambiguation)
