= 1958 Egypt Cup final =

- Event: 1957–58 Egypt Cup
Zamalek	Al-Ahly
2	2
- Title shared
Zamalek	Al-Ahly
0	0
- Date: 9 May 1958
- Referee: Hussein Emam

Replay
Zamalek	Al-Ahly
2	2
- Date: 13 May 1958
- Referee: Hussein Emam

1958 Egypt Cup final, was the final match of 1957–58 Egypt Cup, between Zamalek & Al-Ahly, with the game ending 0–0 meant the two sides could not be separated, so a replay was played four days later, the replay game ends 2–2, title shared between the two clubs for the 2nd time (after 1943).

== Route to the final ==
Zamalek		Round	Al Ahly
Opponent	Result	1957–58 Egypt Cup	Opponent	Result
Gaish	2 - 0	First Round	Ithad Domiat	5 - 1
Ismaily	3 - 0	Quarterfinals	Ithad Suez	5 - 2
Tanta	1 - 0	Semifinals	Al-Sekka Al-Hadid	3 - 0

== Game description ==
=== Match details ===
9 May 1958

Zamalek	0 – 0 (a.e.t.)	Al-Ahly
	Report

Referee: Hussein Emam

Zamalek	Al-Ahly

Zamalek:
GK	(Italy) Aldo Stella
RB	(United Arab Republic) Yakan Hussein
CB	(United Arab Republic) Nour El-Dali
CB	(United Arab Republic) Alaa El-Hamouly
LB	(United Arab Republic) Samir Qotb
CM	(United Arab Republic) Abdou Noshi
CM	(United Arab Republic) Essam Baheeg
RW	(United Arab Republic) Khalil Said Quadry
AM	(United Arab Republic) Raafat Attia
LW	(United Arab Republic) Zamer Ezzat
CF	(United Arab Republic) Bibo
Manager:

Al-Ahly:
GK	(United Arab Republic) Adel Hekal
RB	(United Arab Republic) Tarek Selim
CB	(United Arab Republic) Talaat Abdel Hamid
CB	(United Arab Republic) Reda Abdel Hamid
LB	(United Arab Republic) Rifaat El-Fanageely
CM	(United Arab Republic) Soliman Fares
CM	(United Arab Republic) El-Sayed El-Dhizui
RW	(United Arab Republic) Toto
AM	(United Arab Republic) Sherif El-Guindi
LW	(United Arab Republic) Mimi El-Sherbini
CF	(United Arab Republic) Wagih Moustafa
Manager:

=== Replay ===
13 May 1958

Zamalek	2 – 2 (a.e.t.)	Al-Ahly
Baheeg 12'; El-Hamouly 103' (pen.)	Report	El-Sherbini 8', 101'

Referee: Hussein Emam

Zamalek	Al-Ahly

Zamalek:
GK	(Italy) Aldo Stella
RB	(United Arab Republic) Yakan Hussein
CB	(United Arab Republic) Ahmed Refai
CB	(United Arab Republic) Alaa El-Hamouly
LB	(United Arab Republic) Samir Qotb
CM	(United Arab Republic) Abdou Noshi
CM	(United Arab Republic) Essam Baheeg
RW	(United Arab Republic) Mohamed El-Tahawi
AM	(United Arab Republic) Khalil Said Quadry
LW	(United Arab Republic) Sharif El-Far
CF	Demian
Manager:

Al-Ahly:
GK	(United Arab Republic) Adel Hekal
RB	(United Arab Republic) Tarek Selim
CB	(United Arab Republic) Abdel Wahab Selim
CB	(United Arab Republic) Reda Abdel Hamid
LB	(United Arab Republic) Rifaat El-Fanageely
CM	(United Arab Republic) Soliman Fares
CM	(United Arab Republic) Wagih Moustafa
RW	(United Arab Republic) El-Sayed El-Dhizui
AM	(United Arab Republic) Saleh Selim
LW	(United Arab Republic) Taha Ismail
CF	(United Arab Republic) Mimi El-Sherbini
Manager:
