= Solomon Worshipping Idols =

1647 painting by Jacques Stella

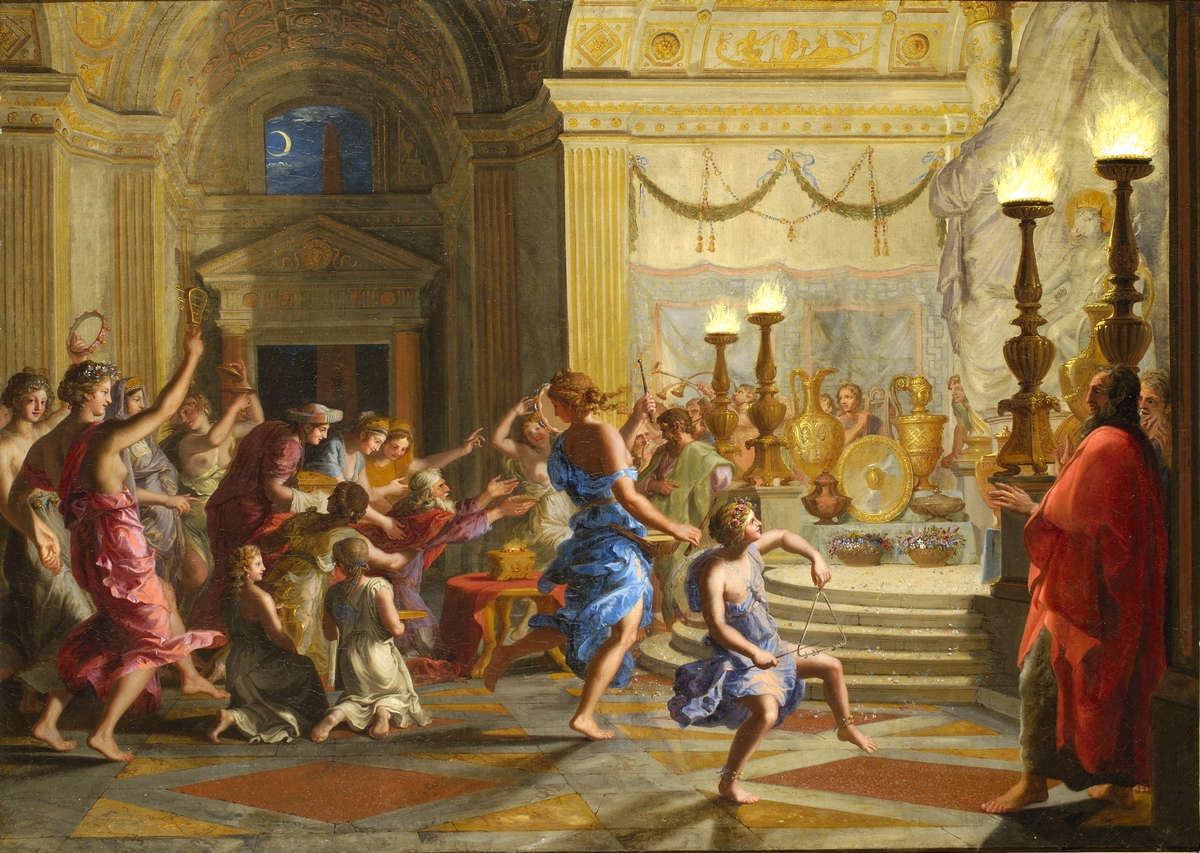
Solomon Worshipping Idols (1647) by Jacques Stella

Solomon Worshipping Idols is a 1647 painting by Jacques Stella, inspired by his trip to Italy and influenced by his meeting with Nicolas Poussin on the journey. It and its pair Solomon Receiving the Queen of Sheba are both in the Museum of Fine Arts of Lyon.

== Sources ==
- Sylvain Kespern, Bossuet, miroir du Grand siècle, Phileas Fogg, 2004.
