= Stellaris =

Stellaris may refer to:

== Entertainment ==
- Stellaris (video game), a 2016 video game developed by Paradox Development Studio
- Stellaris Casino, a casino in Puerto Rico, part of the San Juan Marriott Resort & Stellaris Casino
- Stellaris Casino, a casino in Aruba, part of the Aruba Marriott Resort & Stellaris Casino

== Science ==
- Stellaris, a vitrectomy system developed by Bausch & Lomb
- Stellaris RNA FISH, a type of fluorescence in situ hybridization

== Species ==
- Stellaris autumnalis or Prospero autumnale, an autumnal flowering plant
- Stellaris bohemica or Gagea bohemica, a European and Mediterranean species of flowering plant
- Stellaris soleirolii or Gagea soleirolii, a European flowering plant
- Botaurus stellaris or Eurasian bittern, a species of wading bird
- Brodiaea stellaris, a species of flowering plant in the cluster-lily genus
- Cyclocarpa stellaris, a species of flowering plant in the legume family, Fabaceae
- Hibbertia stellaris, a brilliantly orange flowering ground cover
- Phacelia stellaris, a rare species of flowering plant in the borage family
- Sabatia stellaris, an annual plant
- Saxifraga stellaris, a synonym of Micranthes stellaris, an Arctic–alpine species
- Utricularia stellaris, a medium to large sized suspended aquatic carnivorous plant

== Other ==
- Stellaris, an ARM Cortex-M3 based 32-bit MCU family from Texas Instruments

== See also ==
- Stellar (disambiguation)
