= Stellar =

Stellar means anything related to one or more stars (stella). The term may also refer to:

== Arts, entertainment, and media ==
- Stellar (magazine), an Irish lifestyle and fashion magazine
- Stellar Loussier, a character from Mobile Suit Gundam SEED Destiny
- Dr. Stellar, a Big Bang Comics superhero
- Stellar 7, a game for the Apple II computer system
- Stellar (film), a Canadian film

=== Music ===
- Stellar (group), a South Korean girl group
- Stellar (New Zealand band), a New Zealand-based rock band
- Stellar (musical artist), an American singer, songwriter, and producer
- "Stellar" (song), a 2000 song by Incubus
- Stellar Awards, awards for the gospel music industry

== Brands and enterprises ==
- Stellar (payment network), a system for sending money through the internet
- Stellar Group (construction company), a construction company in Florida, United States
- Hasselblad Stellar, a compact digital camera
- Hyundai Stellar, an automobile model
- O2 XDA Stellar, an HTC mobile phone

== Other uses ==
- Stellar Airpark, an airport near Chandler, Arizona, United States
- Stellar Charter School, a school in Redding, California, United States
- Eliot Stellar (1919–1993), American psychologist

== See also ==
- List of stellar properties, links to astrophysics pages with the word stellar
- Star or stellum
- Stella (disambiguation)
- Stellar II (disambiguation)
- Stellaris (disambiguation)
- Starla (disambiguation)
