= Pacarku Jinny =

2024 fantasy television series

- Genre: Fantasy; Drama; Comedy
- Created by: Manoj Punjabi
- Screenplay by: Hanan Novianti; Mahartania; Dinda A.F Suratman; Muhammad Nurman
- Directed by: Anggy Umbara
- Starring: Caitlin Halderman; Anrez Adelio; Ria Ricis; Rebecca Klopper; Kevin Faulky; Devina Kirana; Aditya Herpavi; Robert Chaniago; Denino; Faiz Vishal; Lexie Aliyah
- Opening theme: "1 Cinta 2 Dunia" — StarBe
- Ending theme: "1 Cinta 2 Dunia" — StarBe
- Country of origin: Indonesia
- Original language: Indonesian
- No. of seasons: 1
- No. of episodes: 10

Production
- Executive producer: Shania Punjabi
- Producer: Manoj Punjabi
- Editor: Gita Miaji
- Camera setup: Multi-camera
- Production companies: MD Entertainment; Umbara Brothers Film

Original release
- Network: WeTV
- Release: 26 December 2024 – 27 February 2025

Pacarku Jinny (English: My Beautiful Genie) is an Indonesian fantasy television series produced by MD Entertainment and Umbara Brothers Film which premiered on 9 December 2024 on WeTV. It stars Caitlin Halderman, Anrez Adelio and Ria Ricis.

== Plot ==
Lila is a charming genie who is stranded on earth after losing her bracelet which is her means of transportation when saving a man's life. The only memory she has is the tattoo on the man's chest.

She must race against time to get her bracelet back within 100 days or face destruction. During her journey, Lila falls in love with Andra, a producer, only to discover that he is the mysterious man she has been looking for. However, getting her bracelet back means Andra will die.

Now, she is in a dilemma and torn between two choices between saving her own life and the love of her life. Lila must make an impossible choice. So, will Lila sacrifice her love to save herself? Or will Lila take the risk to be with Andra, and face the greatest consequences?

== Cast ==
- Caitlin Halderman as Jinn Lila
- Anrez Adelio as Andra
- Ria Ricis as Jinn Krissy
- Rebecca Klopper as Maudy
- Kevin Faulky as Nicholas
- Devina Kirana as Anita
- Imran Ismail as Beno
- Aditya Herpavi as Awang
- Guzman Sige as Diki
- Hendrayan as Doni
- Faiz Vishal as Director
- Anneu Aputri as Assistant Director
- Lexie Aliyah as Dessy
- Jeri Alfandi as Infomat
- Robert Chaniago as Director of Photography
- Denino as Shaman

== Production ==
=== Development ===
In July 2024, WeTV announced the series was titled Cinta Dua Dunia (Love of Two Worlds) then changed to Pacarku Jinny (My Beautiful Genie). The series finished filming for 45 days. and it was stopped filming due to Ria Ricis was pregnant.
