= Stellar II =

Stellar II may refer to:

- Hyundai Stellar II, a Hyundai car in the late 1980s
- Hasselblad Stellar II, a Hasselblad compact digital camera (based on the Sony Cyber-shot DSC-RX100M2) released in 2014

== See also ==
- Stellar (disambiguation)
