= Antoine Bouzonnet-Stella =

French painter (1637–1682)

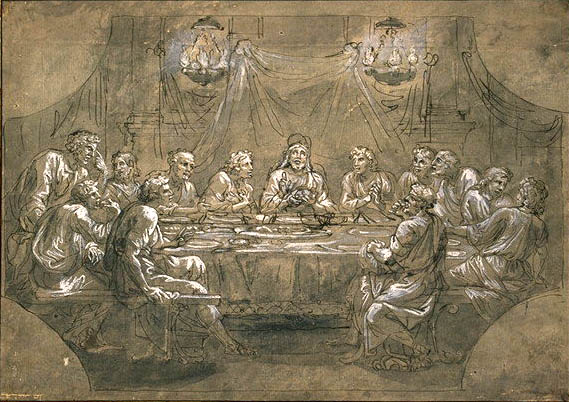
The Last Supper

Antoine Bouzonnet-Stella (25 November 1637 – 9 May 1682) was a French painter and printmaker, a pupil and nephew of Jacques Stella.

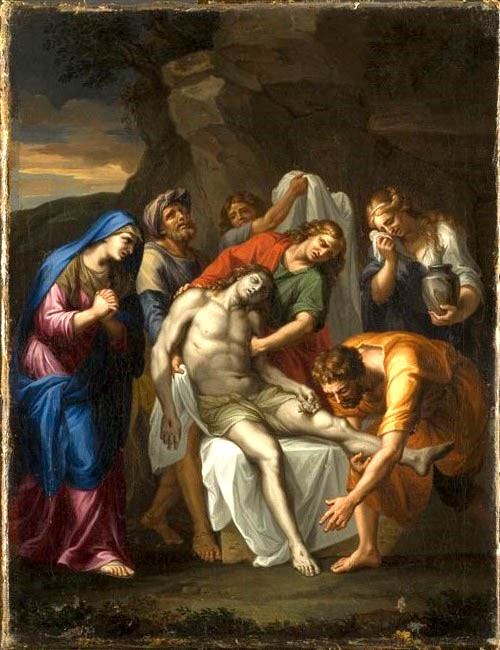
The Entombment

== Life ==
He was born at Lyons on 25 November 1637, the son of Étienne Bouzonnet, a goldsmith, and his wife, painter Madeleine Stella. He studied art in Paris under his uncle, Jacques Stella who, having achieved considerable success as a painter, had decided to set up a workshop to produce prints after his own designs. To staff it, Stella brought in his sister's children, Antoine, Claudine, Antoinette, and Francoise, all of whom moved from Lyon to live in his apartments in the Louvre.

In 1666 Bouzonnet-Stella was received as a member of the Académie de peinture et de sculpture for his picture of The Pythian Games. He died in Paris on 9 May 1682. There are several known etchings by him, including Moses defending the Daughters of Jethro, after Nicolas Poussin.
