= Caitlin Halderman =

Indonesian actress, singer and presenter (born 2000)

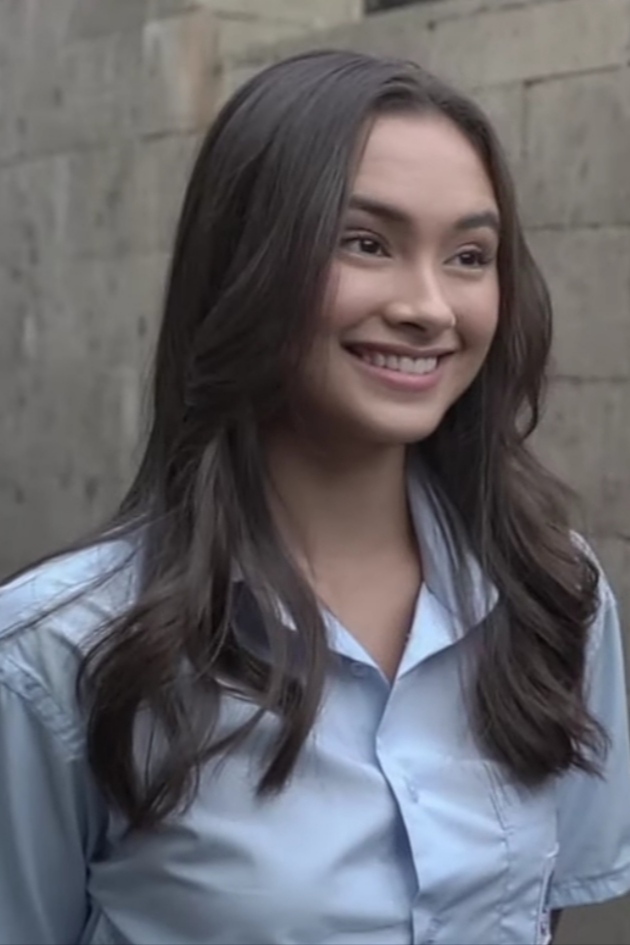
- Halderman in 2022
- Born: Caitlin Halderman Chaniago; 17 July 2000 (age 26); Jakarta, Indonesia
- Education: University of California, Santa Barbara
- Occupations: Actress; singer; presenter
- Years active: 2015–present
- Musical career
- Genres: Pop
- Instrument: Vocal
- Label: dr.m

Caitlin Halderman Chaniago (born 17 July 2000) is an Indonesian actress, singer and presenter. She made her acting debut as the female lead character in the 2016 film, Ada Cinta Di SMA. Her name became widely known after playing, Love Letter for Starla in 2017. She is of Dutch descent.

== Early life ==
Caitlin was born on 17 July 2000 in Jakarta to Frank Halderman and Asmaini Aswad Chaniago. Her father is Dutch, while her mother is Minangkabau. She has a younger sister named Jade Helena Halderman Chaniago.

Before she started her career in the entertainment industry, she took part in the National Water Polo Championship to represent Jakarta in 2015.

== Career ==
Caitlin made her acting debut in Patrick Effendy's musical-romance film Ada Cinta di SMA in 2016. She played the role of Ayla and acted together with CJR personnel at the time, Iqbaal Ramadhan, Alvaro Maldini, and Teuku Rizky Muhammad. She also contributed to the soundtrack of the film as a singer. She sang the song "Sampaikan Sayangku Untuknya" with Iqbaal. After that, she starred in a number of films, including The Guys (2017), a comedy-drama film directed by writer and comic Raditya Dika.

Her name became widely known for her role as Starla, in a short film, which later became a theatrical film, Love Letter for Starla in 2017.

== Filmography ==
=== Film ===
Year	Title	Role	Notes
2016	Ada Cinta di SMA	Ayla	
2017	The Guys	Via	
2017	Surat Cinta untuk Starla	Starla Putri Adicahya	
2018	Forever Holiday in Bali	Putri	
2019	DreadOut	Linda	
2020	Dignitate	Alana	
2021	The Watcher	Tiara	
2022	Ivanna	Ambar	
2022	Until Tomorrow	Kartika	
2023	Dunia Tanpa Suara	Arissa	
2024	Ancika: Dia yang Bersamaku 1995	Milea Adnan Hussain	
2024	Melodate	Melody	
2024	Menjelang Ajal	Ratna	
2024	My Annoying Brother	Amanda	
2025	Setetes Embun Cinta Niyala	Diah	
TBA	Kupilih Jalur Langit		

Notes

Not released yet
- TBA : To be announced

=== Short film ===
Year	Title	Role	Notes
2017	Surat Cinta untuk Starla	Starla Putri Adicahya	
2021	Aku dan Mesin Waktu	Sukma	

=== Web series ===
Year	Title	Role	Notes
2022	Married with Senior	Mika L. Atmadja	
2022	Pretty Little Liars 2	Siti "Ema" Halima	Replaces Eyka Farhana
2022—2023	Surat Cinta untuk Starla the Series	Starla Putri Adicahya	
2023	Why?	Gladys	
2024—2025	Pacarku Jinny	Lila	
2024—2025	Pakai Hati Reborn	Bianca	
2026	Algojo	Icha	

=== Music video ===
- "Duka" — Last Child (2016)
- "Surat Cinta untuk Starla" — Virgoun (2017)
- "Bukti" — Virgoun (2018)
- "Ragu" — Rizky Febian (2019)
- "Mesin Waktu" — Budi Doremi (2021)
- "Menyerah" — Last Child (2021)
- "Orang yang Sama" — Virgoun (2021)
- "Aku yang Terluka" — Judika (2023)
- "Ramadhan Penuh Cinta" — Budi Doremi (2024)

=== Television show ===
- Tonight Show (2023) as guest host
- Tonight Show Premiere (2023—now) as host
- Turnamen Olahraga Selebriti Indonesia (2024, season 2) as participant
- Inbox Nite (2025) as guest host

== Discography ==
=== Single ===
- "Sampaikan Sayangku untuk Dia" — with Iqbaal Dhiafakhri Ramadhan (2016, theme song Ada Cinta di SMA)
- "Cinta Salah" (2016, theme song Ada Cinta di SMA)
- "Destiny" — with Thunder (2018, theme song Forever Holiday in Bali)
- "Cinderella" (2018, theme song Forever Holiday in Bali)
- "You Were a Friend" (2020)
- "Apa Ini Cinta" (2021, theme song Aku dan Mesin Waktu)
- "Dengarkan Pintaku" (2023)

== Award and nomination ==
Year	Award	Category	Nomination work	Result
2016	Piala Maya	Selected Child/Teen Actors/Actresses	Ada Cinta di SMA	Nominated
2021	Indonesian Journalist Film Festival	Best Lead Actress - Horror Film Category	The Watcher	Nominated
