= Antoinette Bouzonnet-Stella =

French artist (1641–1676)

Antoinette Bouzonnet-Stella (died 1676), was a French engraver.

== Life ==
She was born at Lyons in about 1641, the daughter of Étienne Bouzonnet, a goldsmith, and his wife, artist Madeleine Stella (sister of the artist Jacques Stella). Her siblings included Antoine and Claudine Bouzonnet-Stella.

According to Joseph Strutt:

She made more use of the point than her sister [i.e. Claudine], and etched in a very powerful style. She harmonized the roughness, left by the aqua-fortis, with the graver, in such a manner as to produce a pleasing effect. She drew correctly, especially the extremities of the human figure, which she expressed with great taste.

She died in Paris at the age of 35 in 1676, having suffered a fall. A third sister, Françoise, was also an engraver.

== Works ==
Her works include:

- Romulus and Remus suckled by a Wolf; after Antoine Bouzonnet Stella.
- The Entry of the Emperor Sigismund into Mantua; after a stucco frieze by Giulio Romano.
Engravings by Antoinette Bouzonnet-Stella depicting the Entry of Emperor Sigismund into Mantua

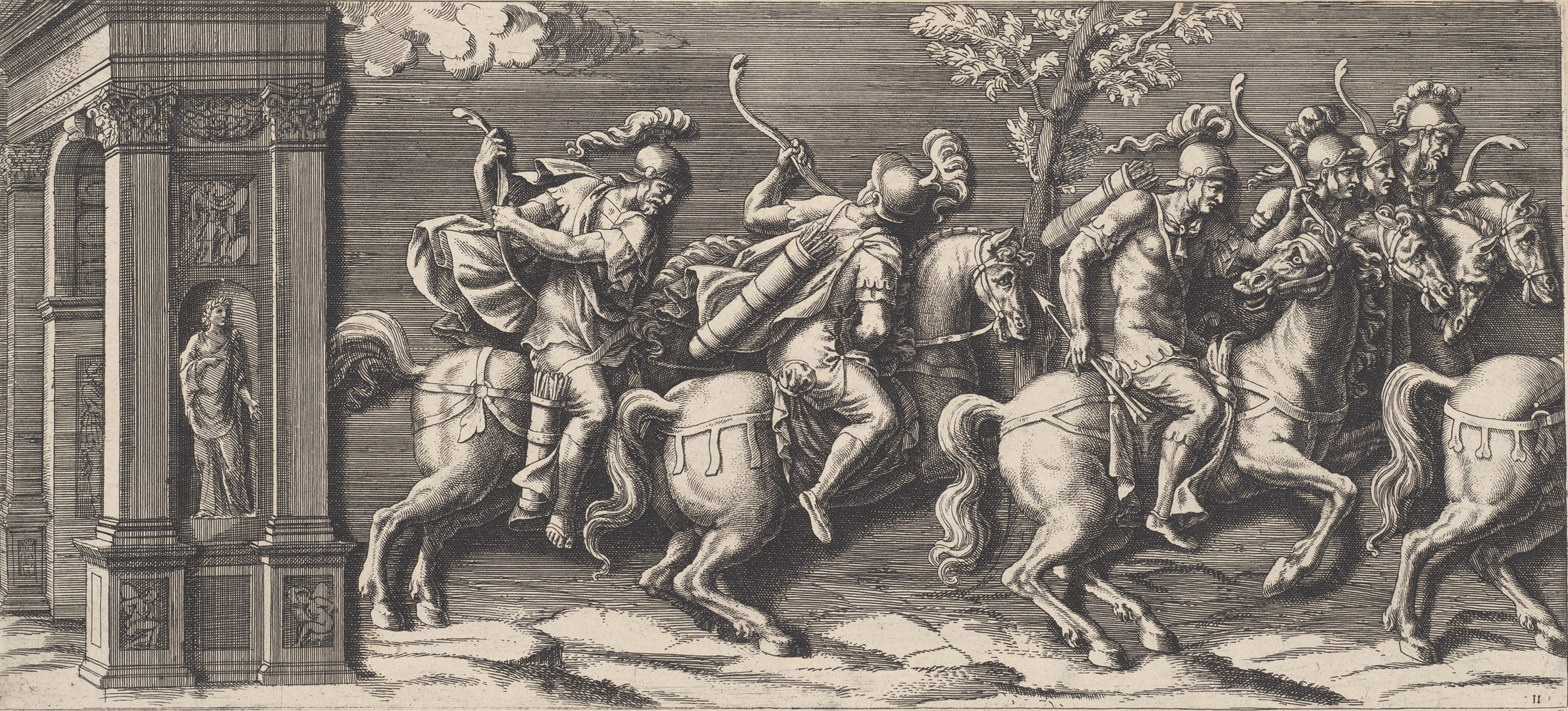

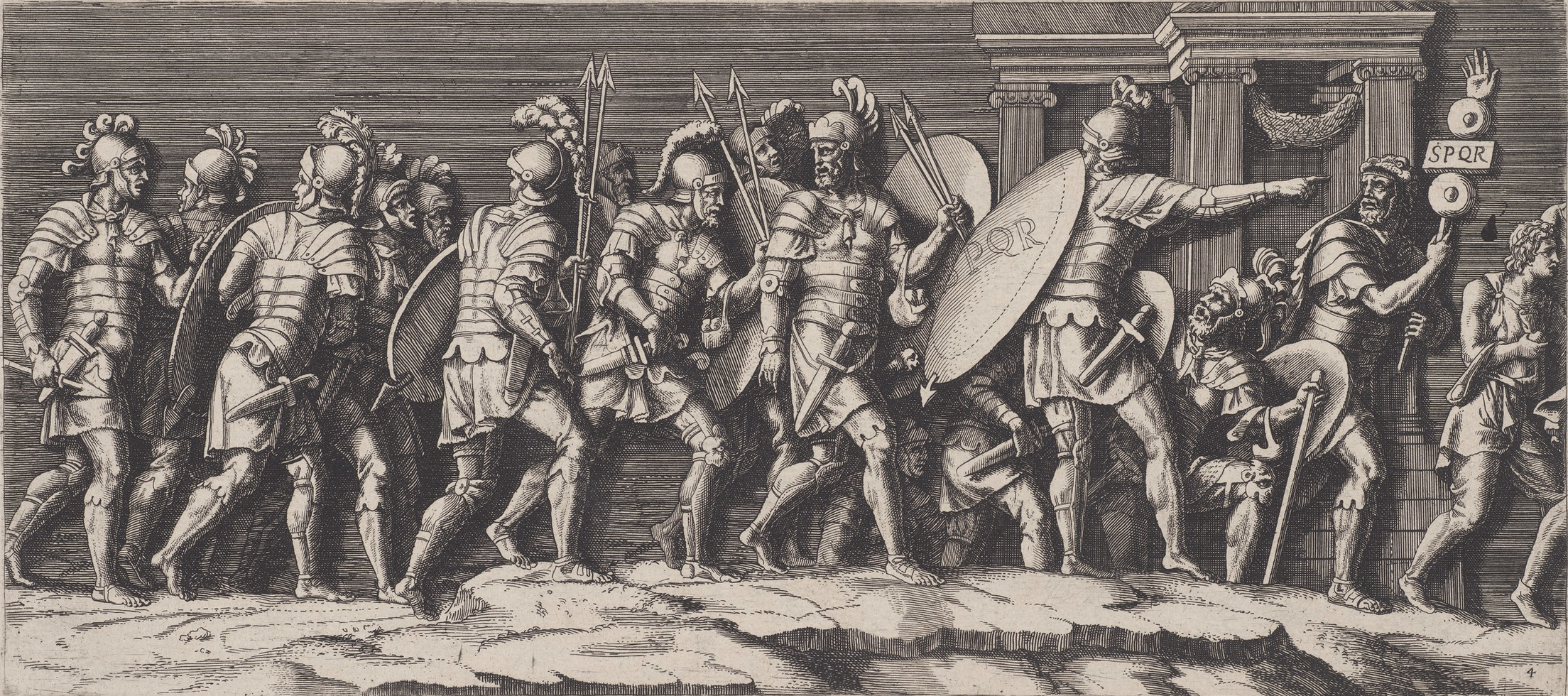

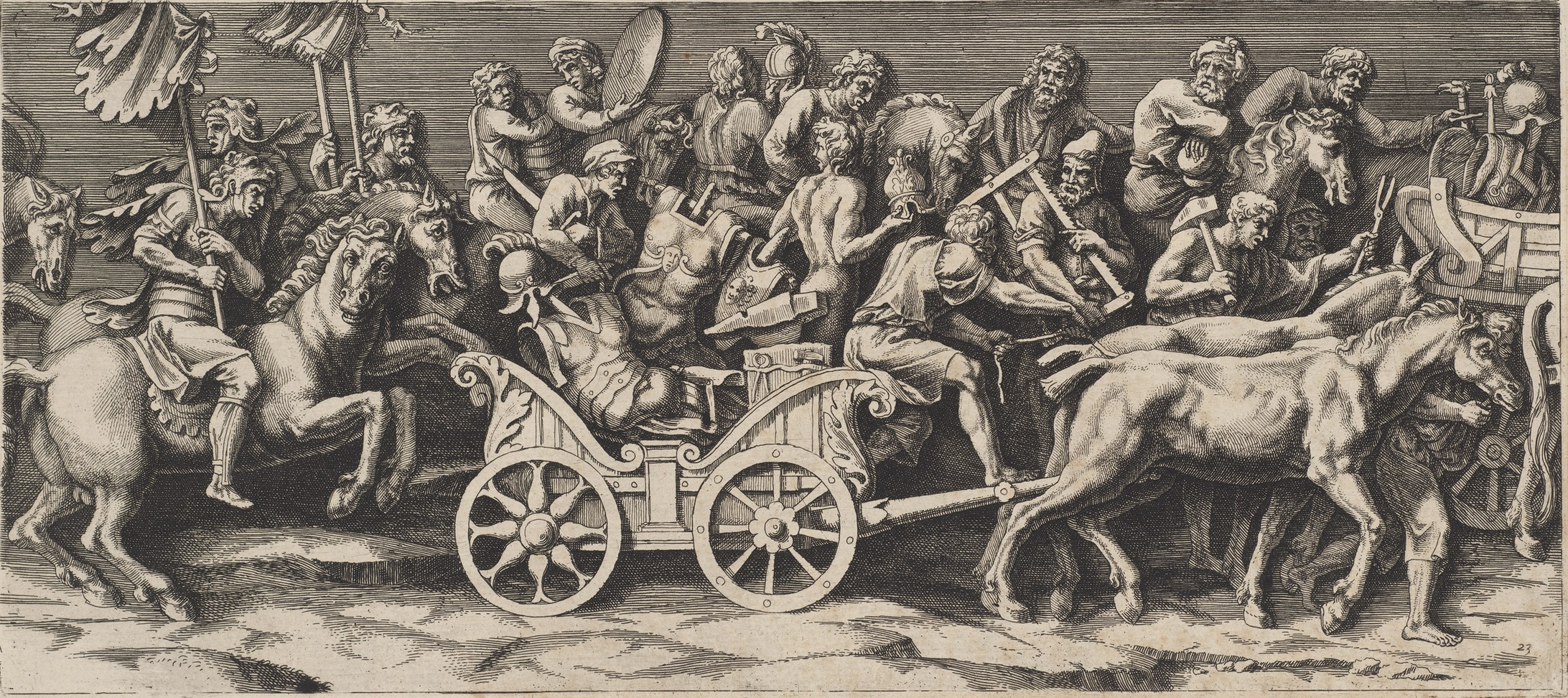
