= Tarek Salim =

Egyptian footballer (born 1983)

Personal information
- Full name: Tarek Salim
- Date of birth: June 23, 1983 (age 43)
- Place of birth: Egypt
- Position: Striker

Team information
- Current team: Al Ittihad Alexandria

Senior career*
Years	Team	Apps	(Gls)
2013–2015	El Raja Marsa Matruh	40	(9)
2015–	El Ittihad Alexandria	0	(0)
- * Club domestic league appearances and goals as of July 23, 2015

Tarek Salim (born June 23, 1983), is an Egyptian football striker.

In July 2015, he moved to Ittihad Alexandria.
