= STELLA (language courses) =

European Union online language learning project

- Type of project: Online language learning project
- Funding: European Commission

The STELLA project was originally supported and co-funded by the European Commission. The aim was to develop a new language learning methodology for online language learning suitable for European learners. The project's aim was also to deliver online language learning courses for less widely taught and used languages (LWTULs) within the European Union in order to meet the European Union's aim to "safeguard the linguistic diversity in Europe". The methodology was subsequently used in courses which further delivered languages considered to be of strategic importance to the EU and member states.

STELLA courses:

- are used by students, tourists and business people,
- incorporate the Council of Europe's syllabus (Breakthrough, Level A1),
- guide students towards a European Language Certificate,
- are designed specifically for the internet,
- allow students to study in their native language,
- include STELLA software that allows further courses to be created for other languages.

The project's methodology has been implemented with Arabic, Danish, Hungarian, Spanish, Turkish and English.

== Background ==
Article 149 of the EU Treaty states that the role of the EU is to “contribute to the development of quality education by encouraging cooperation between Member States and, if necessary, by supporting and supplementing their action.”

== Overarching EU policy goal ==
According to the Lisbon Strategy (March 2000), the overarching EU policy goal is that “The Union must become the most competitive and dynamic knowledge-based economy in the world.” In the 2005 relaunch, the goal was stated as follows: The EU is to become “an advanced knowledge society with sustainable development, more and better jobs and greater social cohesion.” The EU works towards these policy goals on the one hand through policy work with Member States and on the other through subsidizing educational programmes.

The key challenge for the EU is to achieve multilingualism. As Umberto Eco (1993) stated, “we must place our hope in a polyglot Europe”. Multilingualism is a core value in Europe: it is one of its unique qualities and contributes to its richness. However, learning a lingua franca such as English is not enough. Every European citizen should speak their mother tongue and at least two other European languages.

== The European Union's language objectives ==
To achieve the aim the EU's policy objectives are to promote language learning and linguistic diversity within Europe and to complement EU programmes by addressing language teaching and learning needs at every stage of a person's life.

These objectives and needs will be met by:

- developing materials for teaching less widely spoken and taught languages,
- building up competence in languages which in turn can reinforce European global competitiveness
- developing methods to motivate language learners
- promoting multilingual comprehension between languages.

== The programmes ==
The EU initiative that funded transnational educational programmes was the Socrates programme. This was replaced in 2007 by the Lifelong Learning Programme 2007-2013. Within the Socrates programme the Lingua Action supported projects that promoted language learning while the Minerva Action promoted innovation in the fields of ICT and education.

== STELLA ==
=== Methodology ===
Underlying the whole project is the STELLA methodology, which implements the ideas and objectives laid down in the Common European Framework of Reference for Modern Languages. The methodology is oriented towards the European Language Certificates, levels A1/A2. Supporting documents include a graded and sequenced distribution of topics, themes, language functions, lexis and syntax which authors can use as a basis to generate online language learning material. The generic system constitutes the electronic implementation of the STELLA methodology. The core material in STELLA is a language learning course (written in English), which serves as a model for authors to write courses for other languages.

=== STELLA courses ===
The STELLA courses are suitable for:

- learners who want to work towards a recognized European Language Certificate,
- learners who want to visit a country and want to learn the basics of the language,
- learners who wish to study online,
- learners who cannot take part in classroom activities because they live in a remote area or because of a disability,
- language schools and colleges which want to integrate an online e-course to support their classroom teaching. Stella e-courses can complement other learning courses as they follows an established syllabus.

== See also ==
- Language education
