= Claudine Bouzonnet-Stella =

French artist (1636–1697)

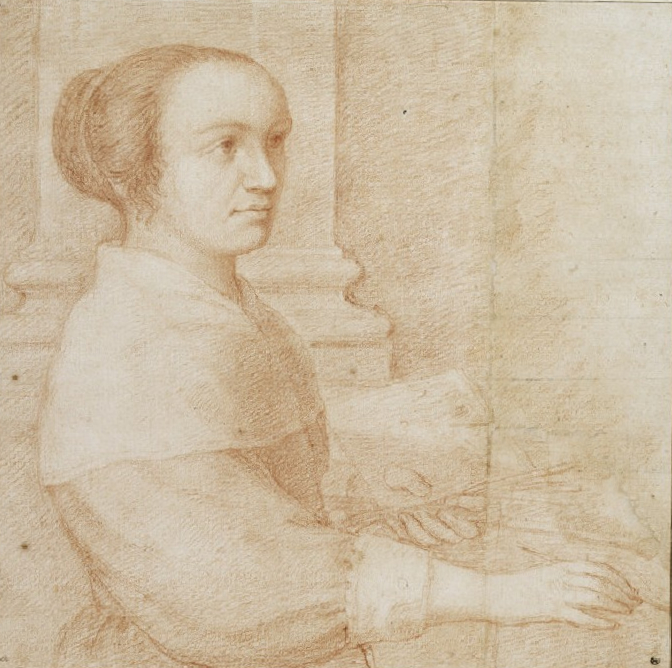
Portrait of Claudine Bouzonnet Stella, facing right, holding a brush and palette

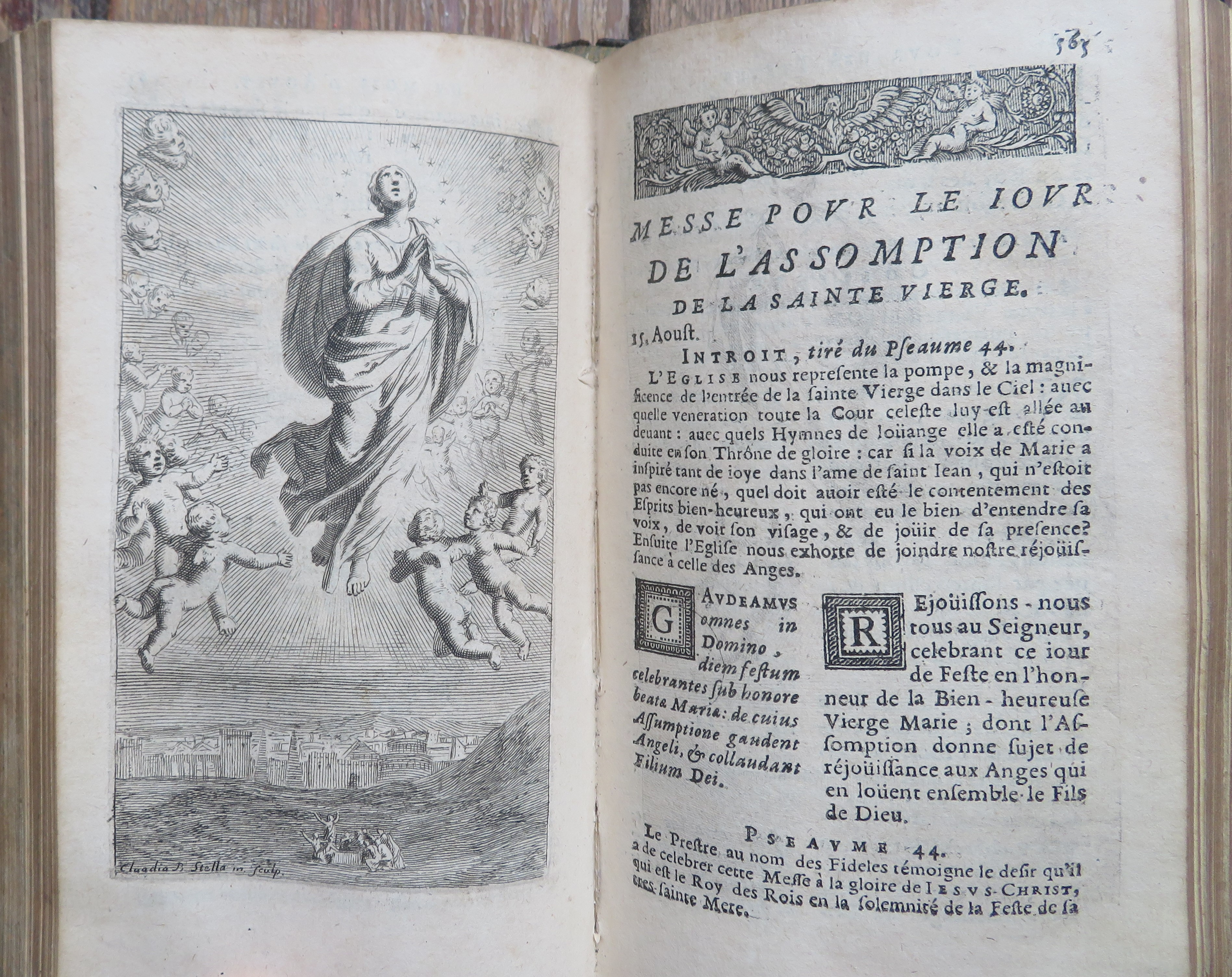
Claudine Bouzonnet Stella, The Assumption of the Holy Virgin. 1667. Etching, 11,2 x 7 cm. Signed: Claudia B. Stella in. Sculp. Lyon, Jamie Mulherron

Claudine Bouzonnet-Stella (7 July 1636 – 1 October 1697) was a French engraver, most of whose prints were after works by Nicolas Poussin, or by her uncle Jacques Stella, from whom she received her artistic education.

== Life ==
She was born at Lyon in 1636, the daughter of Étienne Bouzonnet, a goldsmith, and his wife, Madeleine Stella. She studied art in Paris under her uncle, Jacques Stella. Having collaborated with various engravers for many years before achieving considerable success as a painter, Stella had decided to set up a workshop to produce prints after his designs. To staff it he brought in his sister's children, Claudine, Antoinette, Françoise and Antoine, all of whom moved from Lyon to live in his apartments in the Louvre. It is, however, likely that Claudine Bouzonnet-Stella also had some training in engraving from another practitioner, as her uncle's printmaking activities had been restricted to etching.

Following Jacques Stella's death in 1657 she became head of the workshop, and was granted exclusive rights by the king to publish prints after Stella's designs. In the same year she issued Les Jeux et Plaisirs de l'Enfance, a set of 50 plates which she had engraved herself after a series of drawings by Jacques Stella.

In 1667 she published Les Pastorales, a set of 16 prints of rural subjects. Although these too were published as works after Jacques Stella, no originals have been traced, nor are any drawings mentioned in a surviving inventory of the workshop, leading some art historians to suggest that the designs may have been by Bouzonnet-Stella herself. She also produced prints after works by Nicolas Poussin, who had been a close friend of her uncle, and after her own designs. For the latter, however, she did not act as her own publisher.

Her technique combined both etching and engraving. In the late 18th century Joseph Strutt wrote of her prints:

If they be not executed with that precision and neatness, which are found in the best French masters, they possess such beauties as overbalance all defects of that nature. The naked parts of the figures are exceedingly well-drawn; and the characters of the heads are finely expressed. She delineated the other extremities with great taste and correctness.

She died in Paris in 1697.

== Works ==
Her plates are mostly after Jacques Stella and Nicolas Poussin. They include:

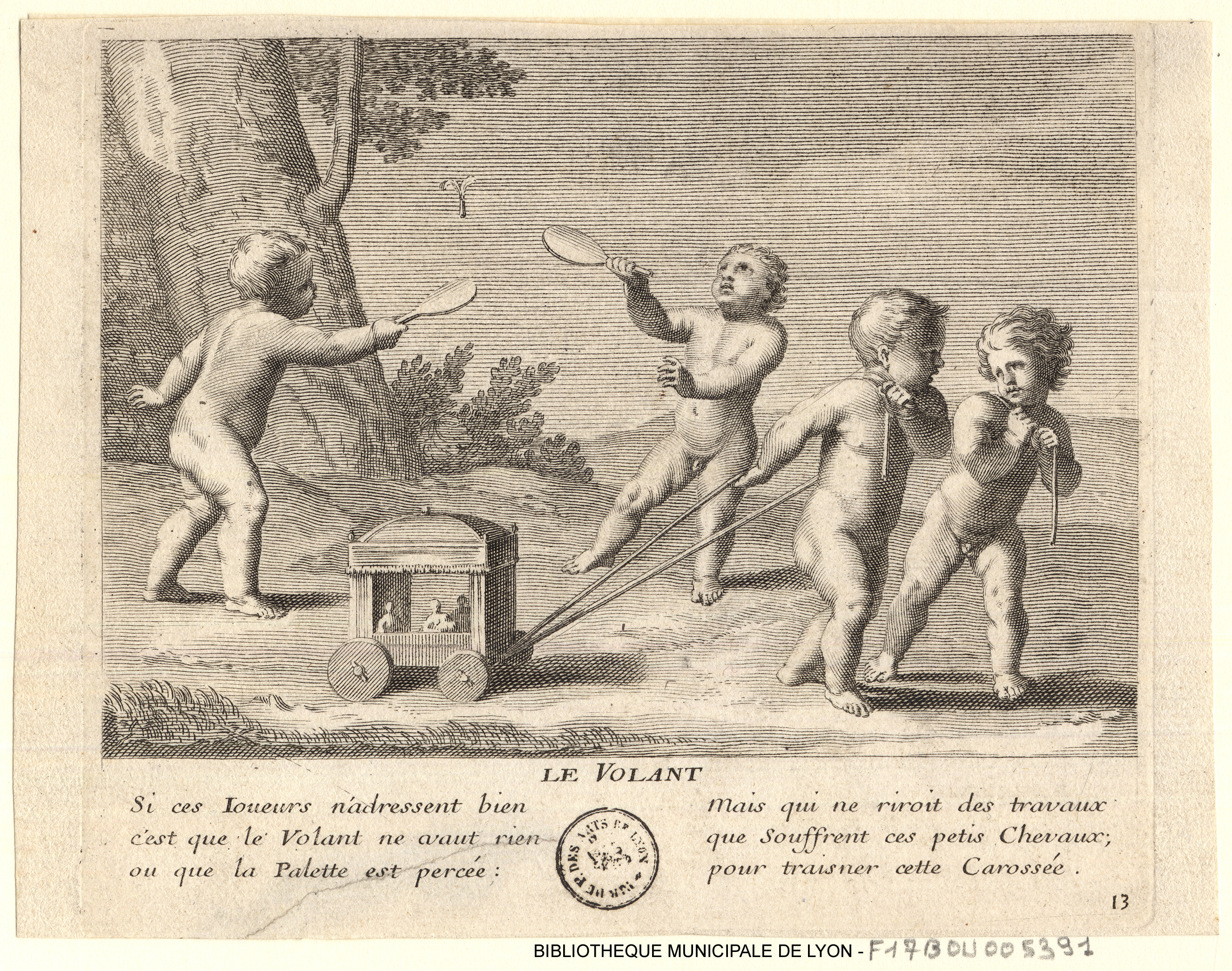
Le Volant, a plate from Les jeux et plaisirs de l'enfance, engraved by Claudine Bouzonnet-Stella after Jacques Stella.

=== After Jacques Stella ===
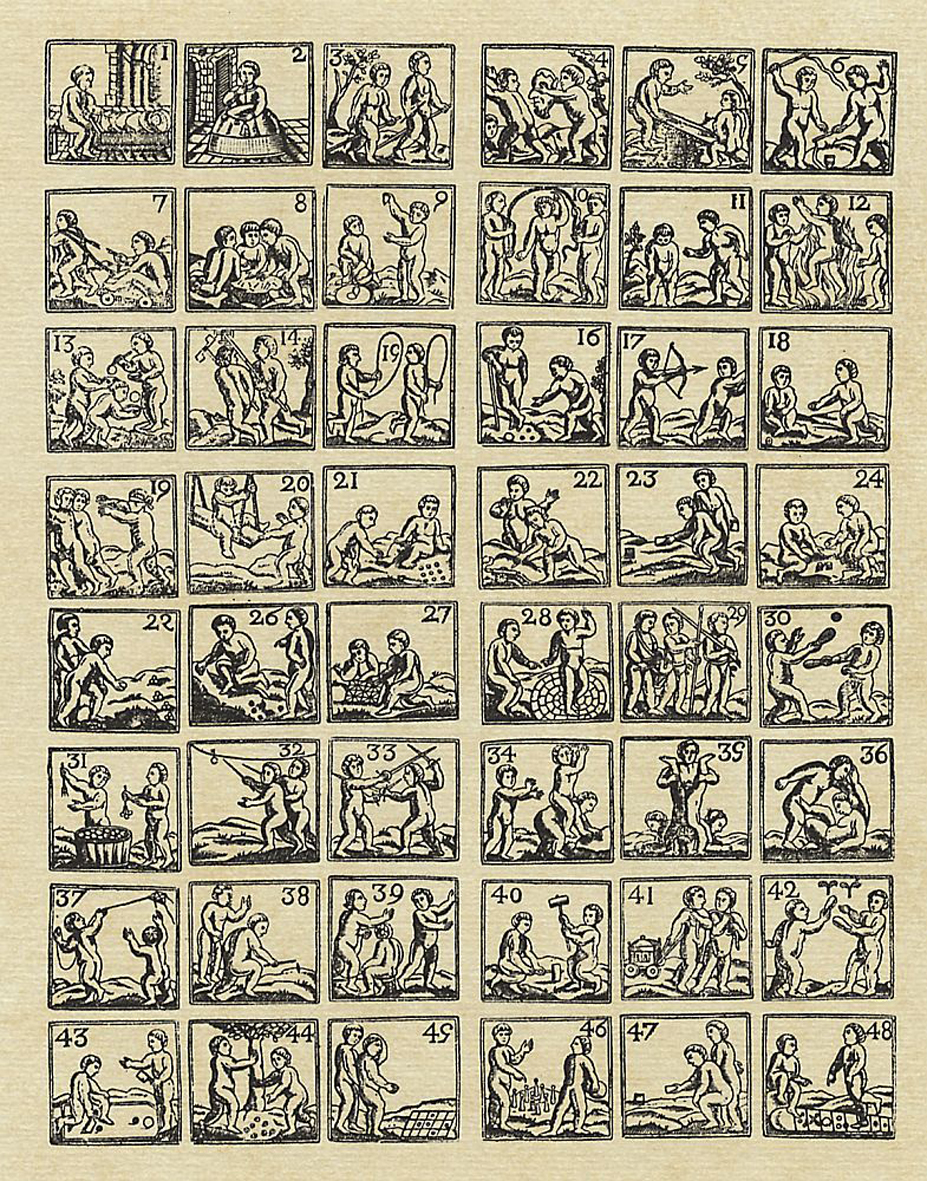
Auca of children’s games.

- Les Jeux et Plaisirs de l'Enfance(1657), a set 50 plates.
- Les Pastorales (1667), a set of 17 plates, including a title page.
- The Marriage of St. Catharine.
- Christ at the Column

=== After Nicolas Poussin ===
- Moses found in the Bulrushes, in two plates.
- Moses striking the Rock.
- The Crucifixion, called the Great Calvary.
- St. Peter and St. John curing the Lame Man.
- Holy Family with St John Offering an Apple to the Christ Child.
- Holy Family with Children Bringing Flowers.
