= Stela (name) =

Stela is a Romanian feminine given name. Notable persons with that name include:

- Stela Perin (born 1934), Romanian artistic gymnast
- Stela Popa (born 1982), Moldovan journalist and author
- Stela Popescu (1935–2017), Romanian actress
- Stela Posavec (born 1996), Croatian handball player
- Stela Pura (born 1971), Romanian swimmer
