= Monte Stella =

Monte Stella may refer to the following hills or mountains in Italy:

- Monte Stella (Calabria)
- Monte Stella (Cilento)
- Monte Stella (Cuneo)
- Monte Stella (Milan)
- Monte Stella (Salerno)
