= François Stella =

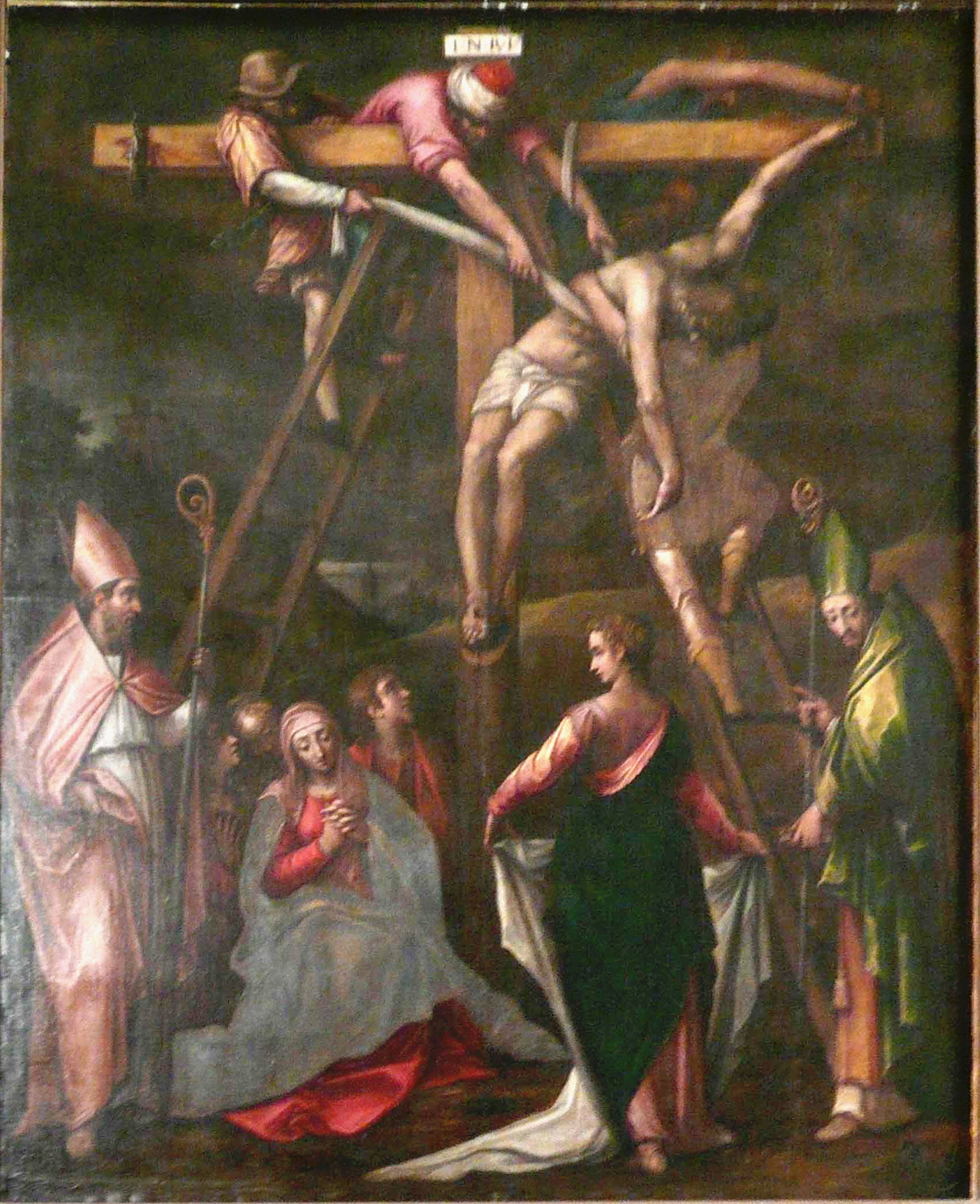
Descent from the Cross

François Stella (1563, Mechelen – 1605, Lyon), was a French Baroque painter.

== Biography ==
According to Houbraken, who mentioned him in a list of Flemish painters he intended to write about, he was only mentioned once by Karel van Mander. Houbraken began the first volume of his work on painters called Schouburgh with a list of painters mentioned once by Van Mander that he intended to write biographies of. Houbraken managed to add biographical data to many of these artists, but some of them were never mentioned again, including Stella, who Van Mander claimed was a good landscape painter living in Lyon.

According to the RKD he was born in Mechelen and travelled to Rome. He is known for landscapes and was the father of Jacques Stella and Francois the Younger.
