= Aldo Stella (historian) =

Italian historian

Aldo Stella (11 July 1923 in Marostica – 28 May 2007 in Padua) was an Italian historian specialising in the Italian Anabaptist movement.

During World War II he fought in the Italian Resistance obtaining the Croce al Merito di Guerra.

== Works ==
- Politica ed economia nel territorio trentino-tirolese dal XIII al XVII secolo, Padova 1958
- Chiesa e Stato nelle relazioni dei nunzi pontifici a Venezia, Città del Vaticano 1964
- Dall’anabattismo al socinianesimo nel Cinquecento veneto, Padova 1967
- Anabattismo e antitrinitarismo in Italia nel XVI secolo, Padova 1969
- La rivoluzione contadina del 1525 e l’utopia di Michael Gaismayr, Padova 1975
- Chiesa e Stato nelle relazioni dei nunzi pontifici a Venezia. Ricerche sul giurisdizionalismo veneziano dal XVI al XVIII secolo, Città del Vaticano 1981 ISBN 88-210-0428-7
- Trento, Bressanone, Trieste, Torino 1987 ISBN 88-7750-164-2
- Dall’anabattismo veneto al ‘Sozialevangelismus’ dei Fratelli Hutteriti e all’illuminismo religioso sociniano, Roma 1996
- Storia dell'autonomia trentina, Trento 1997 ISBN 88-86246-26-9
- Storia d'Italia, vol. 17: I ducati padani, Trento e Trieste (con L. Marini e G. Tocci), Torino 1999 ISBN 88-02-03473-7
- Il Bauernführer Michael Gaismair e l’utopia di un repubblicanesimo popolare, Bologna 1999 ISBN 88-15-07191-1
- Dalle costituzioni degeneri nella Repubblica di Platone alla perfettibilità della Costituzione americana, Roma 2001
- Lepanto nella storia e nella storiografia alla luce di nuovi documenti, Padova 2007
