= Love Letter for Starla =

- Indonesian: Surat Cinta untuk Starla
- Directed by: Rudi Aryanto
- Produced by: Sukhdev Singh; Wicky V Olindo
- Starring: Jefri Nichol; Caitlin Halderman
- Cinematography: Rama Hermawan
- Edited by: Wawan I. Wibowo
- Music by: Joseph S Djafar
- Production companies: Screenplay Films; Legacy Pictures
- Distributed by: Screenplay Films; Legacy Pictures
- Release date: 28 December 2017
- Running time: 104 minutes
- Country: Indonesia
- Language: Indonesian

Love Letter for Starla (Indonesian: Surat Cinta untuk Starla) is a 2017 Indonesian romantic drama film produced by Screenplay Films & Legacy Pictures. The film stars Jefri Nichol & Caitlin Halderman. The title of the movie comes from the song’s title by Virgoun, which is also the song of this film.

== Plot ==
It is about Hema, a guy who is obsessed with living his life with nature (Jefri Nichol). Because of his overwhelming love of nature, he eventually wrote a love letter to nature. From there, Hema then thought to create a graffiti or mural with the help of an ancient typewriter, which was passed down from his ancestors who were former journalists. The intention to make the mural was from his love of the universe. Inadvertently, one day Hema met a girl called Starla (Caitlin Halderman). Starla was an elegant, graceful girl who instantly melted his heart for the first time within six hours after meeting her. Upon reflection, he realizes that there is a much more beautiful love letter than a love letter for nature, and that is the Love Letter for Starla.

But when Starla and Hema's relationship got closer, suddenly something strange changed in Starla. Starla, who had been nice before, began to move away and was often angry. She also tried to stay away from Hema, even telling him to forget all their love stories. Their love story became popular on social media. Even the love story has also been broadcast on the radio by a friend named Hema, named Athena, who worked as a radio announcer.

After a while, Hema gradually learned that Starla's revelation was about herself. Apparently, after Starla investigated away from him, that is about the past of his family.

== Cast ==
- Jefri Nichol as Hema Chandra
- Caitlin Halderman as Starla
- Salshabilla Adriani as Athena
- Ricky Cuaca as Romeo
- Teuku Ryzki as Kiki
- Amanda Manopo as Gadis
- Kevin Royano as Bimo
- Meriam Bellina as Gladys
- Dian Nitami as Retno
- Mathias Muchus as Opa Harjo
- Yayu Unru as Hema's grandfather
- Rianti Cartwright as Bulan
- Ramzi as Policeman
- Zsazsa Utari as Vonny
