= Aldo Stella (footballer) =

Italian footballer (born 1930)

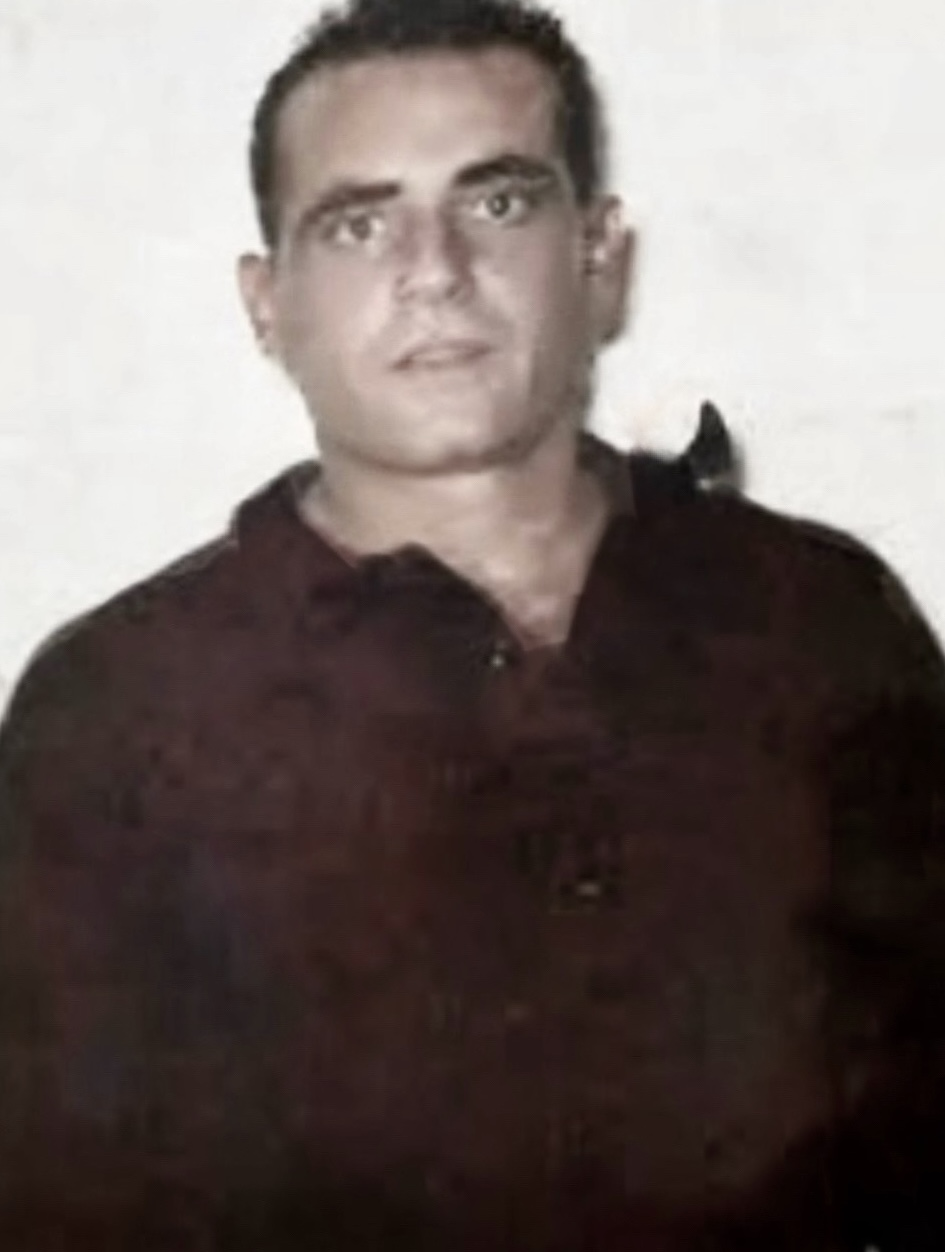
- Stella with Zamalek in 1960

Personal information
- Full name: Aldo Andrey Stella
- Date of birth: 9 August 1930
- Position: Goalkeeper

Senior career*
Years	Team	Apps	(Gls)
1958–1962	Zamalek		
1954–1955	→ S.S. Lazio (loan)		
- * Club domestic league appearances and goals

Aldo Stella (born 9 August 1930) is an Italian former football goalkeeper who played in Egypt for Zamalek.

== Personal life ==
Aldo is the younger cousin of Ettore Moscatelli.

== Honors ==
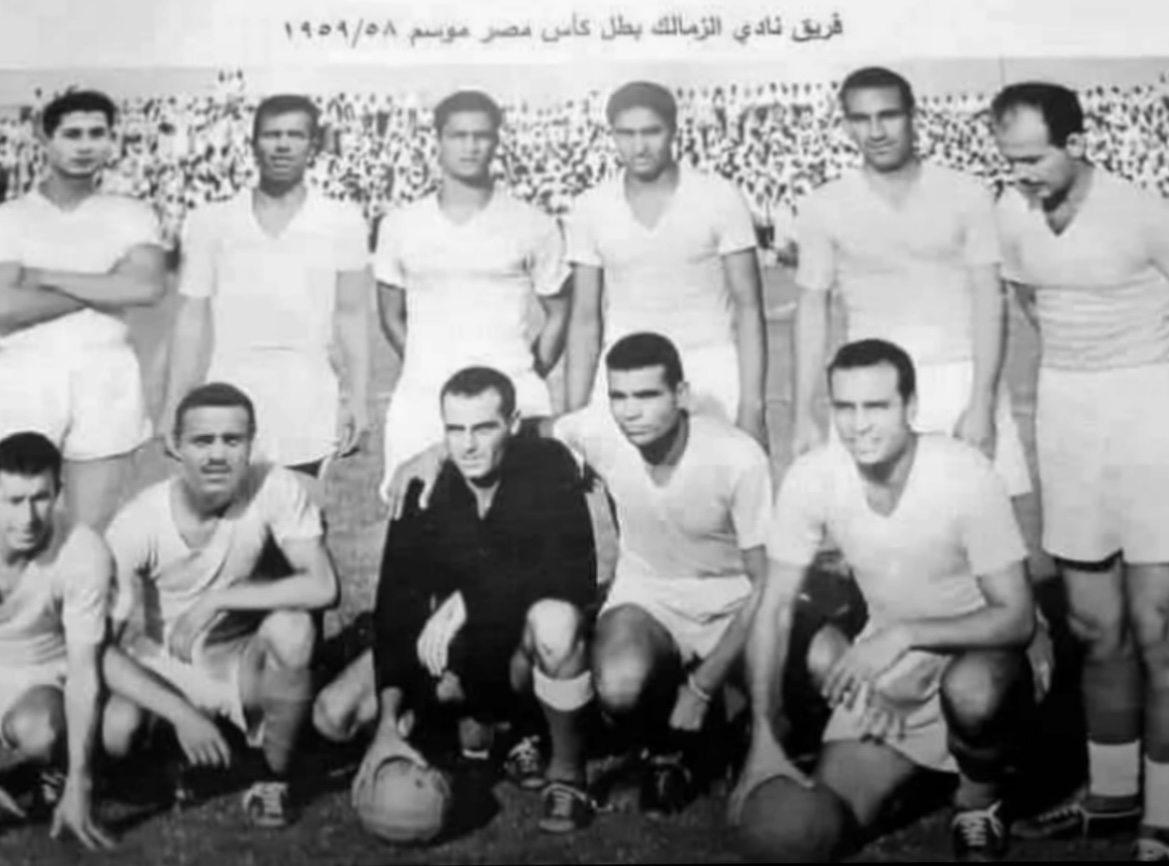
Stella with Zamalek in 1959

Zamalek SC

- Egyptian Premier League: (1)
  1959–60
- Egypt Cup: (4)
  1957–58, 1958–59, 1959–60, 1961–62
