= Jacques Stella =

French painter (1596–1657)

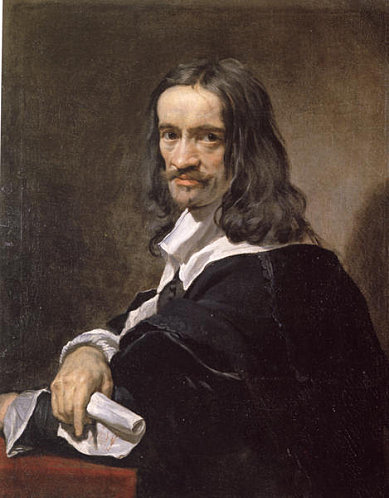
- Self-portrait (musée des Beaux-Arts de Lyon)
- Born: 1596; Lyon
- Died: 29 April 1657 (aged 60–61); Paris
- Known for: Painting
- Movement: Classicism

Jacques Stella (1596 – 29 April 1657) was a French painter, a leading exponent of the neoclassical style of Parisian Atticism.

== Life ==
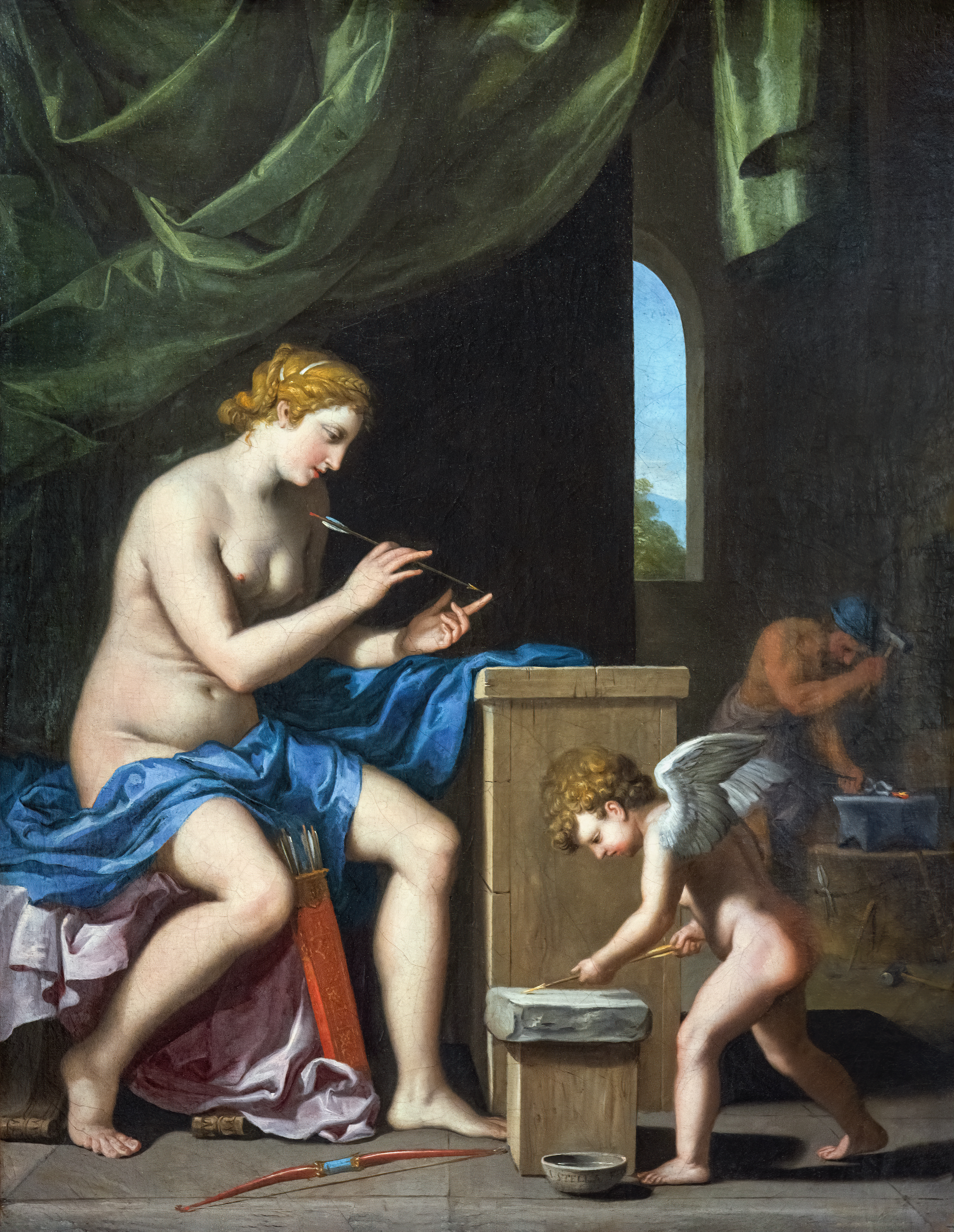
Vulcan forging the arrows of Love

Stella was born in Lyon. His father was François Stella, a painter and merchant of Flemish origin, but he died too soon to train Jacques in painting. Jacques's siblings were François the Younger and Madeleine (a sculptor and the mother of artists). He was the uncle of Antoinette, Claudine, Françoise and Antoine Stella. Jacques Stella trained in Lyon before spending the period from 1616 to 1621 in the court of Cosimo II de Medici in Florence, working alongside Jacques Callot - Florentine art is a strong influence on all Stella's work. On Cosimo's death in 1621 Stella moved to Rome, where he spent the next 10 years and won a reputation thanks to his paintings, small engravings and painted work on stones (onyx, lapis-lazuli or simply slate). Particularly working for pope Urban VIII, Stella was influenced in Rome by classicism and more specifically by the art of Nicolas Poussin, with whom he became an intimate friend.

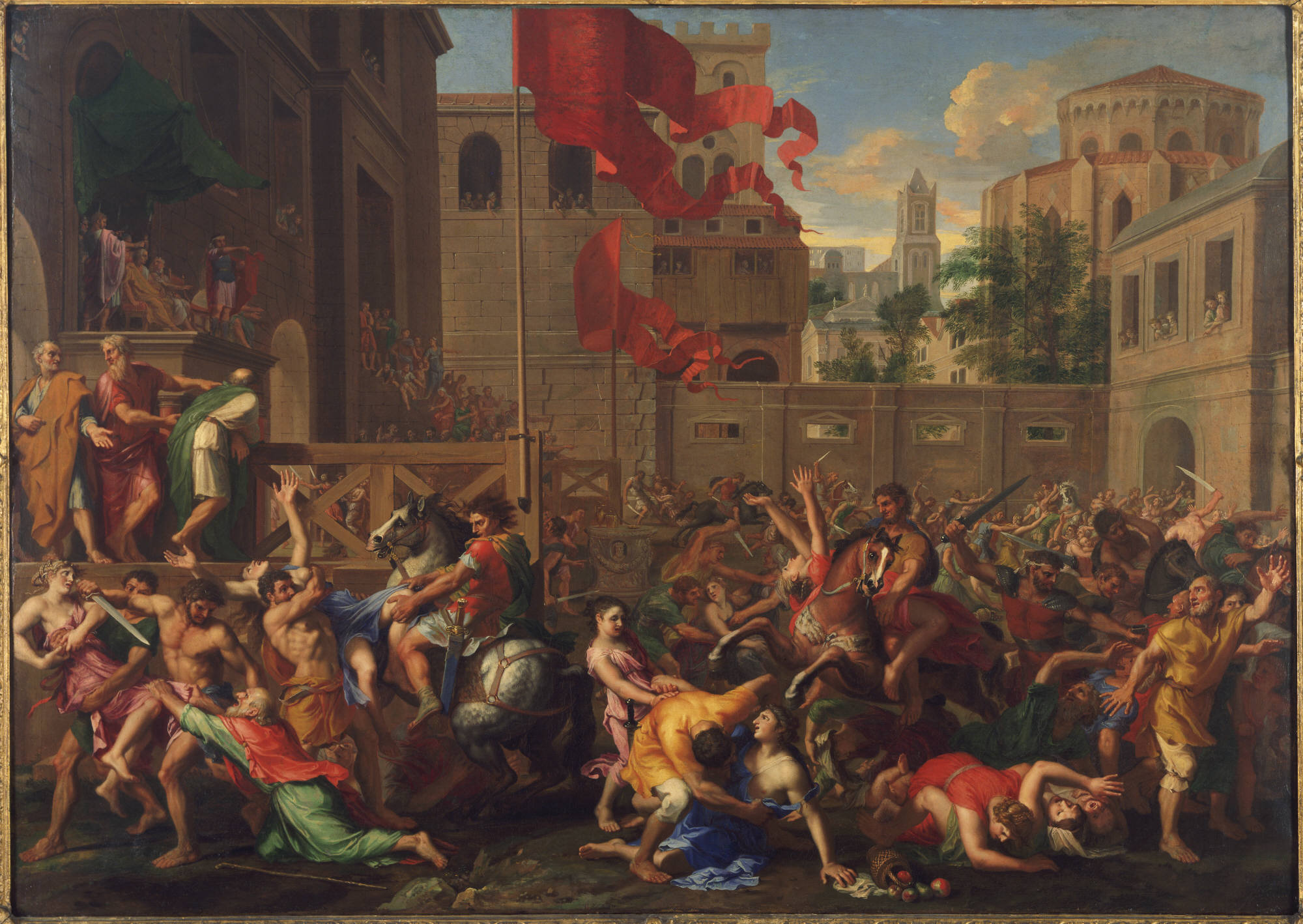
The Rape of the Sabines, Princeton University Art Museum

Returning to Lyon in 1634 before moving to Paris a year later, Stella was presented to Louis XIII by cardinal Richelieu. The king made him peintre du roi (meaning he lived from then on in the Louvre) and granted him a pension of 1000 livres. He returned many times to the theme of the childhood of Christ - five different versions by him of "Jesus discovered by his parents in the temple" exist. He took on many commissions and also decorated the chapelle Saint-Louis at the château de Saint-Germain-en-Laye and the choir of the église Saint-François-Xavier (1641–42) alongside Poussin and Simon Vouet. From 1644 he took part in the decoration of the Palais-Cardinal. Towards the end of his life he devoted himself more and more to drawing. As well as his painting and drawing he was a major art collector throughout his life, building a collection of paintings by Poussin and Raphael and drawings by Michelangelo and Leonardo da Vinci. He died in Paris.

== Reception ==
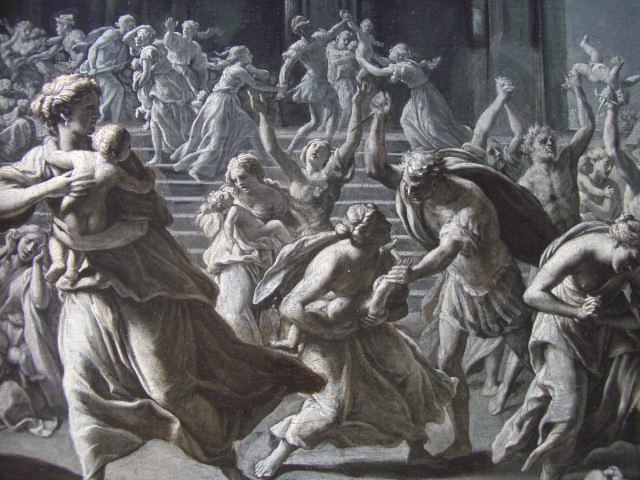
Massacre of the Innocents, Musée des Beaux-Arts de Rouen

Audacious and varied, his work moved easily between the realism of direct observation, the antique spirit and a higher religious inspiration. After his death his paintings and engravings were often sold as works by Poussin. His work was often engraved, allowing his art to reach a wide audience, especially after his death under the impetus of his niece and heiress, the artist Claudine Bouzonnet-Stella (died 1697). A retrospective of his work occurred at the Musée des Beaux-Arts de Lyon from 17 November 2006 to 19 February 2007, before touring to the Musée des Augustins at Toulouse from 17 March to 18 June 2007.

== Selected works ==
- Solomon sacrificing to idols (c 1650), oil on canvas, 98 cm (39 in) x 142 cm (56 in), musée des Beaux-Arts de Lyon.
- Massacre of the Innocents, grisaille (attributed to him), Musée des Beaux-Arts de Rouen.

== Bibliography ==
- (in French) Sylvain Laveissière & Gilles Chomer, Jacques Stella (1596–1657), exhibition catalogue, Lyon, musée des Beaux-Arts, Toulouse, musée des Augustins, 2006–2007, with contributions by: Mickaël Szanto, Isabelle Dubois, Fabienne Albert-Bertin, Anne-Laure Collomb, Laurent Laz and Isabelle de Conihout, 2007, Somogy, ISBN 978-2-7572-0050-6.
- (in French) Jacques Stella, Dossier de l'art n° 136
