= Zamalek SC =

Association football club in Giza, Egypt

Zamalek
- Full name: Zamalek Sporting Club
- Nicknames: مدرسة الفن والهندسة (School of Art and Engineering) النادي الملكى (The Royal Club) القلعة البيضاء (The White Citadel) الفارس الأبيض (The White Knight) قاهر الأجانب (Conquerer of the Foreigners) نادي الوطنية والكرامة (Club of Patriotism and Dignity)
- Short name: ZSC, ZAM
- Founded: 5 January 1911; 115 years ago
- Ground: Cairo International Stadium
- Capacity: 75,000
- Chairman: Hussein Labib
- Head Coach: Motamed Gamal
- League: Egyptian Premier League
- 2025–26: Egyptian Premier League, 1st of 21 (champions)
- Website: zamaleksc.com
Home colours	Away colours

Zamalek Sporting Club (Arabic: نادي الزمالك للألعاب الرياضية), commonly referred to as Zamalek, is an Egyptian Club based in Giza, Egypt. The club is best known for its professional men's football team, which plays in the Egyptian Premier League, the top tier of the Egyptian football league system. The club is renowned for its consistent success at both domestic and continental levels, regularly contending in CAF tournaments. Zamalek SC is the most decorated football club in African competitions in the 20th century.

Founded on 5 January 1911 in Cairo as Kasr el-nil club, Zamalek has traditionally worn a white home kit since its inception. The club won its first championship title in 1913. The club is one of the most widely supported in Africa and the Middle East. Zamalek is credited to be the first Egyptian club to participate in the Sultan Hussein Cup in 1917, as a sign of resistance to the British presence in Egypt and a way to display the Egyptian presence in the sport, this encouraged other Egyptian clubs to participate after. In 1941, the club was granted the honorific title after Farouk I and became officially known as Farouk El Awal Club (transl. Farouk I Club), however, since the 1910s, Zamalek was the club's unofficial name and it became official after the 1952 Egyptian revolution.

Domestically, Zamalek established itself as a major force in Egyptian football since the 1920s, as it is the first Egyptian team to win a title in the history of Egyptian football. Zamalek is the first Egyptian club to win Sultan Hussein Cup in 1921, and the first club to win the Egypt Cup in 1922; and the first club to win the Cairo League in 1922–23. In domestic football, the club has won 15 Egyptian Premier League titles, 29 Egypt Cup titles, 4 Egyptian Super Cup titles, 14 Cairo League titles, 2 Sultan Hussein Cup titles, and a record of one title for each of the October League Cup, Egyptian Friendship Cup and Egyptian Confederation Cup. It is one of two clubs that have played in every season of the Egyptian Premier League, and one of seven that have never been relegated to the Egyptian Second Division.

At the international level, Zamalek is the most successful African football club of the 20th century (gaining 9 titles versus 7 for their closest rival), and one of the most successful clubs in the world. They have won five CAF Champions League titles, two CAF Confederation Cup titles, five CAF Super Cup titles and one African Cup Winners' Cup title. It is also the first Egyptian team ever to win the CAF Super Cup in 1994. Zamalek is also considered the Club of the Afro-Asian Century, it was the first Egyptian team to participate in and win the Afro-Asian Cup in 1987; and holds the record for most participations (1987, 1994, and 1997) and most titles after winning it a second time in 1997. Zamalek is also the first Egyptian team to ever qualify for the FIFA Club World Cup when they qualified in 2000 to the 2001 championship, despite the cancellation of the championship later on. Zamalek is regularly contending in CAF tournaments and is one of the most successful clubs in Africa.

== History ==
=== Early years (1911–1915) ===
The writer Ibrahim Allam Juhaina mentions the story of the founding of the Zamalek Sporting Club in the Al-Ahram issue issued on 12 February 1927. The idea of establishing the club began in one of the Santi buildings in Ezbekieh garden. After a short period, around 1911, the idea grew until they acquired land for the club. It was the water company's land on Boulak Street, Fuad I Street after that, and 26 July Street now. Juhayna mentions that most of the club's writings were published in French, and in the first years there was no general assembly, no fixed bodies, and no applicable law.

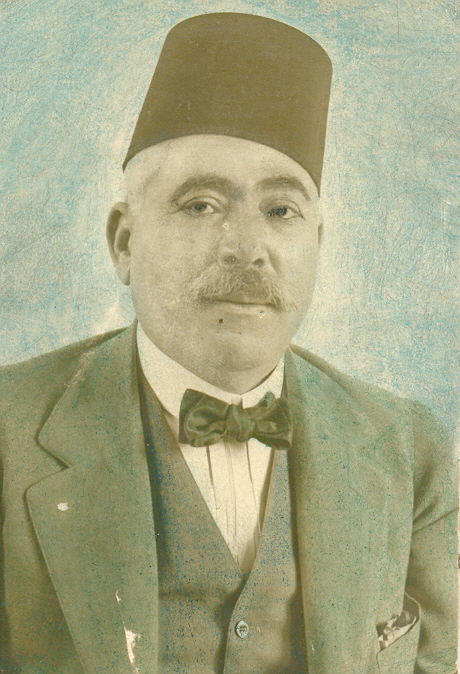
Ahmed Zaki Pasha, Secretary of the Egyptian Cabinet and Zamalek's first Egyptian board member.

Le phare d'Alexandria newspaper reported in its issue of 24 October 1912 that the club was called Cairo International Sports Club, contrary to what is commonly known in modern sources that the club was called Qasr El Nil at that time, and the club was interested in organizing car races between Cairo and Alexandria. It also reported that Ahmed Zaki Pasha, Secretary of the Egyptian Cabinet, was a board member of the club, and that the club board members included Kramer, Bianchi, Morel, Bouchet, Guy, Deputy Director of the Financial Secretariat, and Manhi. Same reported in the next issues of 25 and 26 October 1912. Aegytische Nachrichten newspaper reported in its issue of 26 October 1912 that the club was named Cairo International Sports Club.

Ahmed Zaki Pasha, Secretary of the Egyptian Cabinet, mentions in his book A Journey between Cairo and Alexandria on 2 November 1912, in his book published in French, that the club was called C.I.S.C, and the club's president at that time was Antoine Bianchi, contrary to what is reported in modern sources that George Merzbach was the club's president from 1911 to 1915. The French newspaper La Revue Aerienne mentioned in its issue published on 10 November 1912, that the Cairo International Sports Club (C.I.S.C) published a monthly magazine called Les Sports. The newspaper was founded, as mentioned in the book The Development of the Egyptian Press 1798 – 1951 by Ibrahim Abdo in 1912.

The Aegytische Nachrichten newspaper reported in its issue of 11 December 1912 that the Cairo International Sports Club issued its first weekly newspaper under the name Cairo Sports on Saturday, 11 December 1912. The news was concerned with the Ministry of Labor's approval to allow the club to work on adding signs on all the Cairo-Alexandria Road. The ministry only wanted a preliminary sample. Zamalek (C.I.S.C) participated in the International Union's championships(El Mokhtalat union's), and Le phare d'Alexandria newspaper reported that they won the second edition of the Bolanchi Challenge Cup on 28 December 1913 after defeating the Greek team (who won the Alexandria qualifiers) by a score of 6–0. The match was played at the Zamalek's stadium in Bulaq. Zamalek's starting lineup included; Tawfik Abdullah, Soufi, Saeed, Williams, Gamal, Songhurst, Khorazati, Lyon, Southon, and Arangi. The match started at 3:07 p.m., Lyon scored the first goal in the ninth minute, and Khorazati scored the second goal in the 28th minute, and Khorazati scored two goals in the second half. Before reaching the final match, Zamalek played at home with the Italian Brotherhood team on 23 November 1913, and played with the same team on 30 November 1913.

=== Egyptianization and unprecedented success (1915–1941) ===
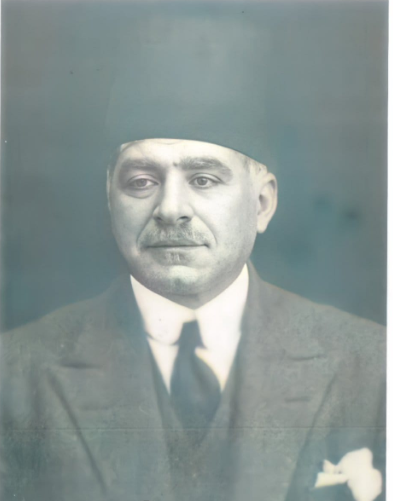
Dr. Mohamed Badr, the first Egyptian president of Zamalek SC, after a long struggle with Mr. Bianchi, the head of the French community in Cairo, to restore the club to the Egyptians.

In 1915, Ibrahim Allam "Juhainah" moved to the club with his football team, coming from El Sekka El Hadid SC. Zamalek was the first Egyptian team to play against foreign teams. In 1916, they defeated the Scottish Horse by a score of 1–0. In 1917, Zamalek had the legacy of participating as the first and only Egyptian football club in Sultan Hussein Cup, the first official football competition in Egypt. Zamalek played great matches and reached the final match against the English GHQ Signals team, the first champion of the competition. The championship was managed by the Egyptian Ibrahim Allam and was organized under the auspices of the Sultan of Egypt Hussein Kamel. After Zamalek's historic first season, many Egyptian clubs announced their desire to participate in the competition as they found it serious, official, bearing the name of the country's sultan, and includes a trophy for the winning team. Zamalek's team in the 1910s included Tewfik Abdullah, Gamil Osman, Fouad Gamil, Ali El-Hassani, Abdel Salam Hamdy and Ahmed Kholousi.

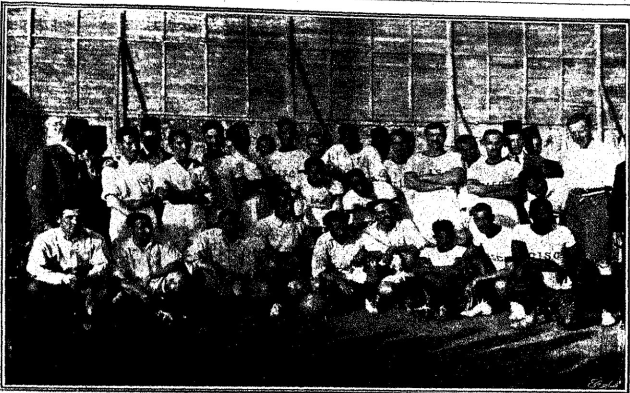
Zamalek SC squad in 1917

In 1917, Ibrahim Allam and the Egyptian members of the club began their revolution to nationalize the club and remove the foreigners from the club's board of directors which mainly consisted of members of the Belgian and French communities. It started with informing the authorities that the club did not have a general assembly for three years, the club records are illegally kept with the club secretary, and have not been legally audited. Allam also put the club under the protection of 17–20 men from Bulaq, to preserve it and protect its Egyptian members. The Ministry of Interior and some foreign embassies in Cairo interfered, but non-Egyptians were not allowed to enter the club. Finally Allam agreed to turn in the club to Mr. Bianchi in the presence of an official force from the police. The Egyptian members realized that it was important to gain a majority at the general members meeting. Accordingly, Allam and the Egyptian members called for an extraordinary general assembly for the club at Al-Shawarby Street.

A decision was made by the general assembly to withdraw confidence from the club's foreign board of directors and elect a new Egyptian board of directors. When the elections were held, the first Egyptian board was elected with Mohammad Badr as president, Mostafa Hassan as treasurer, Ibrahim Allam as General Secretary, and Nicola Arkaji, Mahmoud Bassyouni, Hussein Fawzy, and Abdo El Gabalawy as board members. In 1921, Zamalek won the Sultan Hussein Cup, becoming the first Egyptian team to ever win a title, after their victory over Britain's Sherwood Foresters by a score of 2–1 in the final, the two winning goals were scored by El-Sayed Abaza and Hussein Hegazi. After the victory, historic celebrations began that Egypt had never witnessed before, as a celebratory demonstration took place, and Zamalek fans carried their players on their shoulders in the streets of Cairo to celebrate the victory over the English, which was considered by many at that time as a victory for patriotism. Since then, the Zamalek team has been nicknamed "The Conqueror of Foreigners".

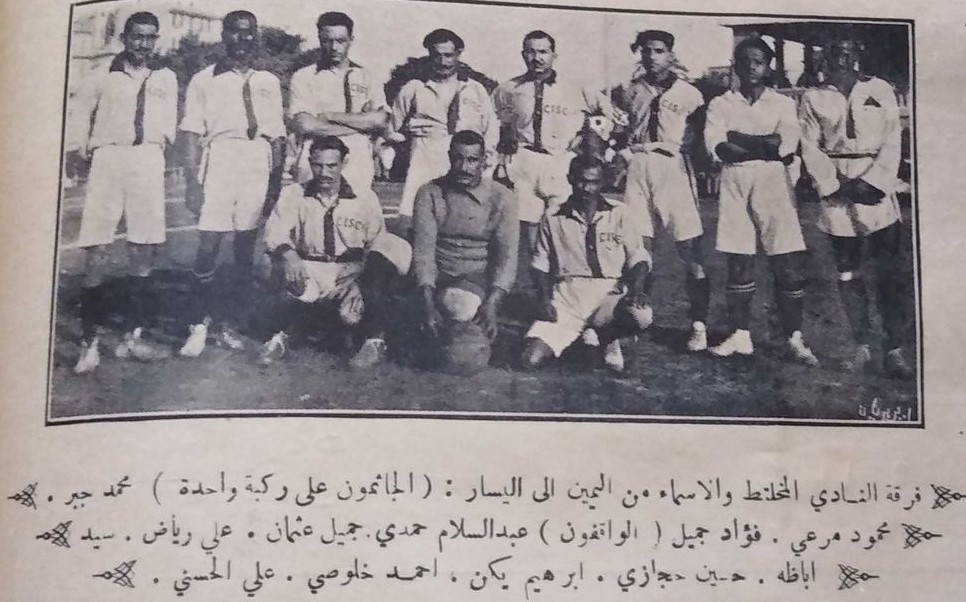
Zamalek SC team that won the first Sultan Hussein Cup in 1921, becoming the first Egyptian team to win a title.

In 1922, Zamalek won the first edition of the Egypt Cup and two weeks later won the Sultan Hussein Cup for the second time, after winning Sherwood Foresters in the final by a score of 3–1. Also in 1922, the Cairo League was launched, and Zamalek won its first title in 1922. Besides Hussein Hegazi, the club managed to create a new generation of talented players such as; Ali Riadh, Ibrahim Yakan, El-Sayed Abaza, Mahmoud Marei and Ali El-Hassani. This team won several titles for Zamalek in the 1920s. They defeated the English Stars 3–0 in 1922. On 5 January 1923, Zamalek won the friendly contest against Al Ahly by a score of 5–0, goals scored by Ali Riadh, Hussein Hegazi and Sadek Fahmy (three goals), the first player to score a hat-trick in the Cairo derby.

After the first board, a new saif in 1923 was formed with Lieutenant General Mohammed Haidar Pasha as president and Youssef Mohamad as secretary. The new board of directors held its first meeting and decided to continue the fight. They informed the authorities of the missing club records. As a result, no general members' meetings were held for the next few years and later, Mr. Shoudoi, the Belgian club secretary was summoned and agreed to turn in the club records. Mohammed Haider Pasha is the fourth president of Zamalek Sporting Club and the longest serving president in its history and managed the club for almost three decades.

Haider Pasha served as Minister of War in the coalition ministry headed by Hussein Sirri Pasha in 1946, and remained in office until 1952. Haider Pasha remained Commander-in-Chief of the Egyptian Army by royal decree, regardless of successive governments, due to King Farouk's insistence on him remaining in his position. Zamalek's strongman also assumed the presidency of the Egyptian Football Association in 1937 and continued to chair successive boards every two years until 1944. Fouad Serageddin Pasha assumed the presidency of the association and Haidar Pasha returned again as president from 1945 to 1952. During his 29-year career as Zamalek's president, Haidar pasha defended the Zamalek's rights and strengthened the club's position, and gave a political weight to the club with the Royal Family and Egyptian public life. He assured that Zamalek's headquarters stay in El-Balloon Theater area in 1945, when the government wanted to move it to Haram Street, and he insisted that it must stay on the Nile banks as a symbol of giving to the society.

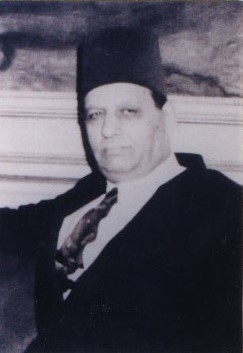
Mohammed Haidar Pasha, Zamalek's 4th and longest serving president

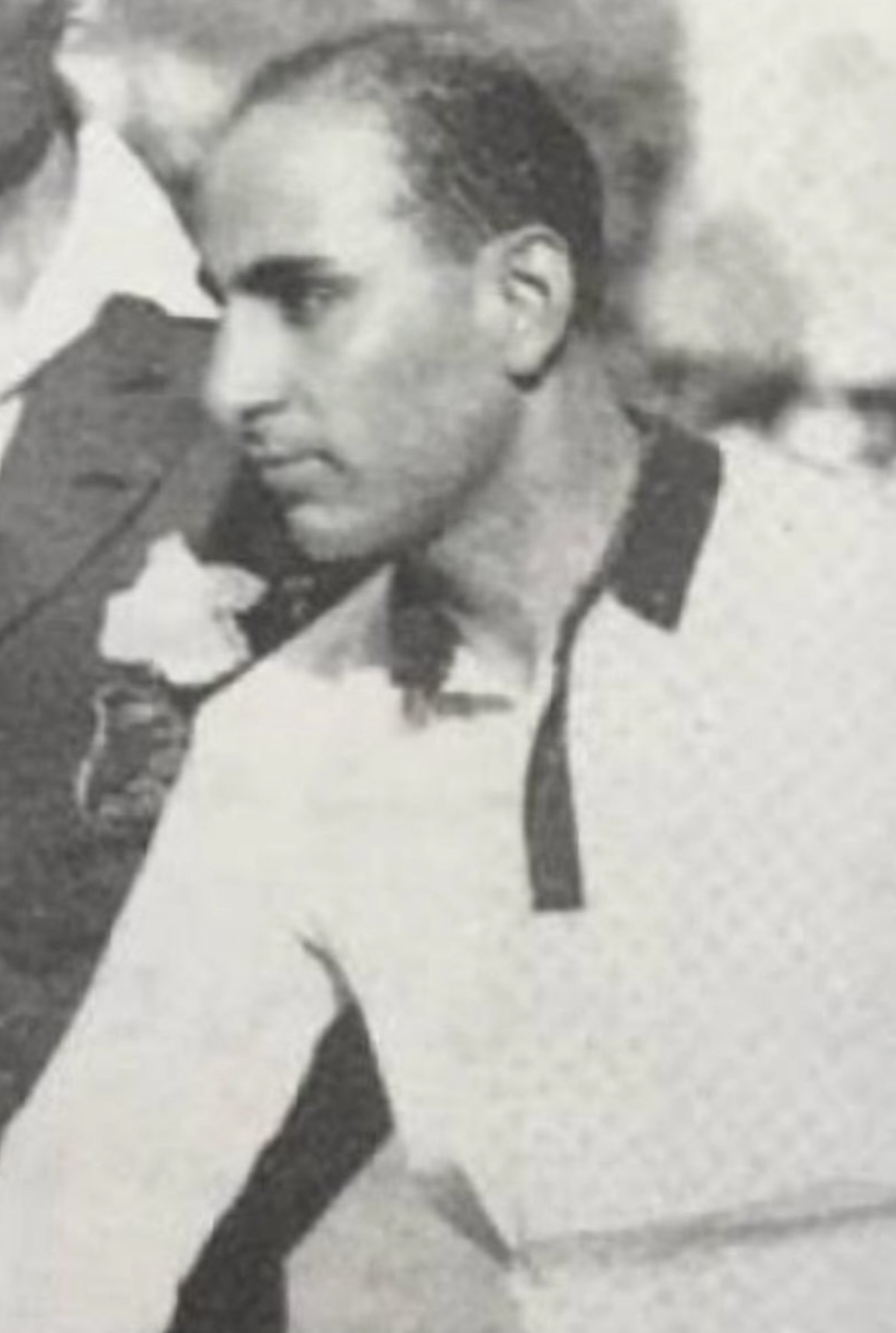
Mohamed Latif, Zamalek's forward

In the winter of 1924, the club moved to a location on the west bank of the River Nile, and west of Gezira island, and became known as the Cairo International Sports Club (C.I.S.C.)-Zamalek. The 1924 location is occupied by El-Balloon Theater today. Around that time Zamalek received the moniker "Qahir-al-Aganib" (the conqueror of foreigners) due to their many victories against renowned foreign teams. In several occasions in Egypt in the 1920s, the team beat foreign teams either in friendly matches or official ones. This increased the popularity of the club and of the sport as a whole in Egypt especially that Egyptian teams such as Zamalek can beat the foreign teams. Zamalek finished as champions in the 1925 King Fouad Cup, for the first time.

In 1925, In continuation of their fame as "Qahir-al-Aganib" (the conqueror of foreigners), Zamalek played four friendly matches against English clubs and won them all, the club defeated the English Howitzers by a score of 6–0, and the English Kings 2–1, and England's Coast Guards 1–0, and the English Wonders 4–1. In the 1923–24 Sultan Hussein Cup, Zamalek and Al Ahly had never met in the final, however, they played six matches in the tournament. Their first match was in the 1924 Sultan Hussein Cup's semifinal on 17 March 1924, the match finished in a 1–1 draw, in the rematch on 21 March, Zamalek won 2–0 and advanced to the final.

In 1928, Hussein Hegazi, who is considered one of the founding fathers of Egyptian football toured the country's secondary schools to search for new players to join Zamalek, and with those students, Hegazi played against Al Ahly in the 1928–29 Cairo League and won. The students cheered on Al Ahly, and it was the first time that the name Zamalek was associated with the school's nickname, but the traditional chant was not born yet. Despite this, it was not completed until 1952, when Zamalek sold 20 trees for 1000 Egyptian pounds and gave them to a contractor to build new stands for the Helmy Zamora Stadium, the traditional chant was completed for the first time and it became, "Oh Zamalek, oh, school of play, art, and engineering".

On the occasion of the opening of the club's new headquarters, Zamalek played against the English Army Club on 7 October 1928, and won by a score of 1–0, and Zamalek also won on 23 October 1928, one of the British teams with a great score of 14–0. This match witnessed only three players from Zamalek scoring 14 goals, namely Gamal El-Prince, Hussein Hegazy, and El-Sayed Abaza. Zamalek proved that they are "Qahir-al-Aganib" (the conqueror of foreigners). Zamalek won two consecutive Cairo League titles in the 1928–29 and 1929–30 seasons. The club managed to lead the league with the help of Mohamed Latif, Ismail Rafaat, Hussein Hegazi and Ali El-Hassani. After winning their second league title in 1928–29, Zamalek played a friendly game against Hungary national football team and they won by a score of 2–1.

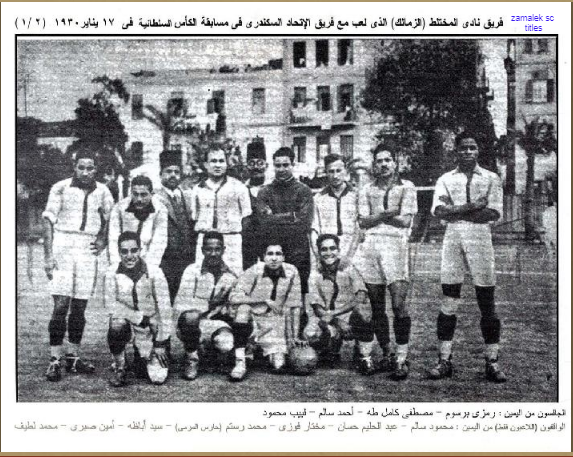
Zamalek's starting lineup in 1930

In the 1929–30 season, Zamalek won their second consecutive league title. In this season Mostafa Taha was Zamalek's new rising star, Taha, who was just 19, in his second season with the club, scored his first goal in the Cairo derby. He moved to Al Ahly for two seasons from 1931 to 1933 before returning to Zamalek in 1933. With Zamalek, he won seven Cairo League titles, five Egypt Cup titles and the King Fouad Cup for one time. He was a great goal scorer and he is Zamalek's all-time top scorer in the Cairo derby with 12 goals, he scored over 100 goals for the team in all competitions. Taha retired as Zamalek's captain in 1945.

One of the notable matches of the 1930s was the 1929–30 Sultan Hussein Cup semifinal, despite that the two belligerents failed to win this season's title, the match was of a high level of intensity and had much media attention. Zamalek faced Al Ahly in a purely Egyptian contest, in which Zamalek knocked Al Ahly out of the competition, after defeating them in the infamous Cairo derby with a score of 3–1, Zamalek's goals were scored by Mohamed Latif and Mostafa Taha (two goals), while Al Ahly's goal was scored by Mahmoud Mokhtar El Tetsh. In the 1930s, Zamalek achieved several titles, winning the 1931–32 Egypt Cup after defeating their rival, Al Ahly, with a score of 2–1, with goals from Ismail Rafaat and Said El-Hadary.

After the retirement of Zamalek's veteran striker Hussein Hegazi in 1931, the club bought Ali El-Hassani from Al Ahly for the third and last time, together El-Hassani with Abdulrahman Fawzi who moved to Zamalek in 1934, Mohamed Latif, Sayed Marei, Ibrahim Halim, Ahmed Salem, Ismail El-Samkari, Helmy Zamora, Hassan El Far and Mostafa Taha managed to win the Cairo League title twice in the 1931–32 and 1933–34 seasons, and in the same year, Zamalek won the 1934 King Fouad Cup title for the second time.

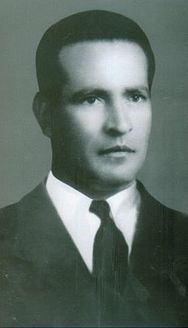
Abdulrahman Fawzi, led the team as a player and coach

In the 1934–35 Egypt Cup, Zamalek faced Cairo Police in the quarterfinals and won 2–0, played against Al Ittihad in the semifinals and won 3–1, goals scored by Mostafa Taha (two goals) and Sayed Marei. Zamalek won the cup after defeating Al Ahly in the final with a score of 3–0, goals scored by Helmy Zamora, Sayed Marei and Ismail El-Samkari. On 2 December 1938, Hussein Labib scored the winning goal for Zamalek over Al Ahly in the 1938 Egypt Cup final rematch, announcing his team's victory after the two teams tied in the first match with a score of 1-1, Labib also scored his team's winning goal. In the 1939–40 Cairo League, Zamalek met their rivals; Al Ahly in the last match of the league on 29 March 1940 where they won with a score of 4–3, Zamalek goals scored by Galal Keraitam, Abdulrahman Fawzi (two goals) and Hussein Labib, and Hussein Madkour (two goals), Salah Osman scored for Al Ahly. Zamalek won the 1939–40 Cairo League title for their sixth time finishing with 3 points ahead of Al Ahly.

=== Domestic dominance (1941–1952) ===
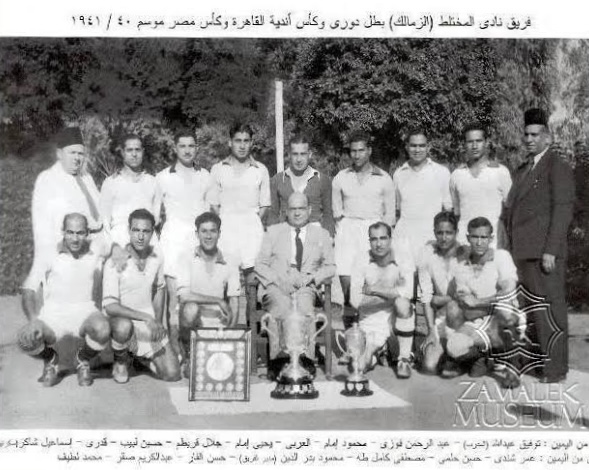
Zamalek's squad that dominated all football competitions in Egypt in 1940–41 season

Zamalek started the 1940s with dominating all the major football tournaments in Egypt, this decade, Zamalek was growing as a sports, social and educational institution. Zamalek won the 1939–40 and 1940–41 Cairo League consecutively and the 1940 King Fouad Cup. With Mohamed Latif still on the pitch as the team's captain and with the help of Tewfik Abdullah, the head coach (Zamalek's forward in the 1920s), the team was unbeatable.

In the 1940–41 league's season, Zamalek achieved impressive results, they won eight matches out of ten, scoring five goals or more in five matches. Zamalek scored 37 goals and received only 9 goals. On 30 May 1941, Zamalek was supposed to face Al Ahly in the final match of the league, Zamalek was two points ahead of Ahly with goal difference of 28 compared to Ahly's 13, which means that Ahly needed to win with eight goals or more to win the title. Al Ahly withdrew and Zamalek played an exhibition match instead against El Sekka on that day to celebrate the title. In 1941, Farouk I, King of Egypt and Sudan, who was himself a fan of Zamalek, bestowed the royal sponsorship on the club, and the club name was renamed to Nady Farouk El Awal (transl. Farouk I Club). Farouk was named the club's honorary president, and Ismail Bek Chirine of Mohammed Ali's family took the post of vice president.

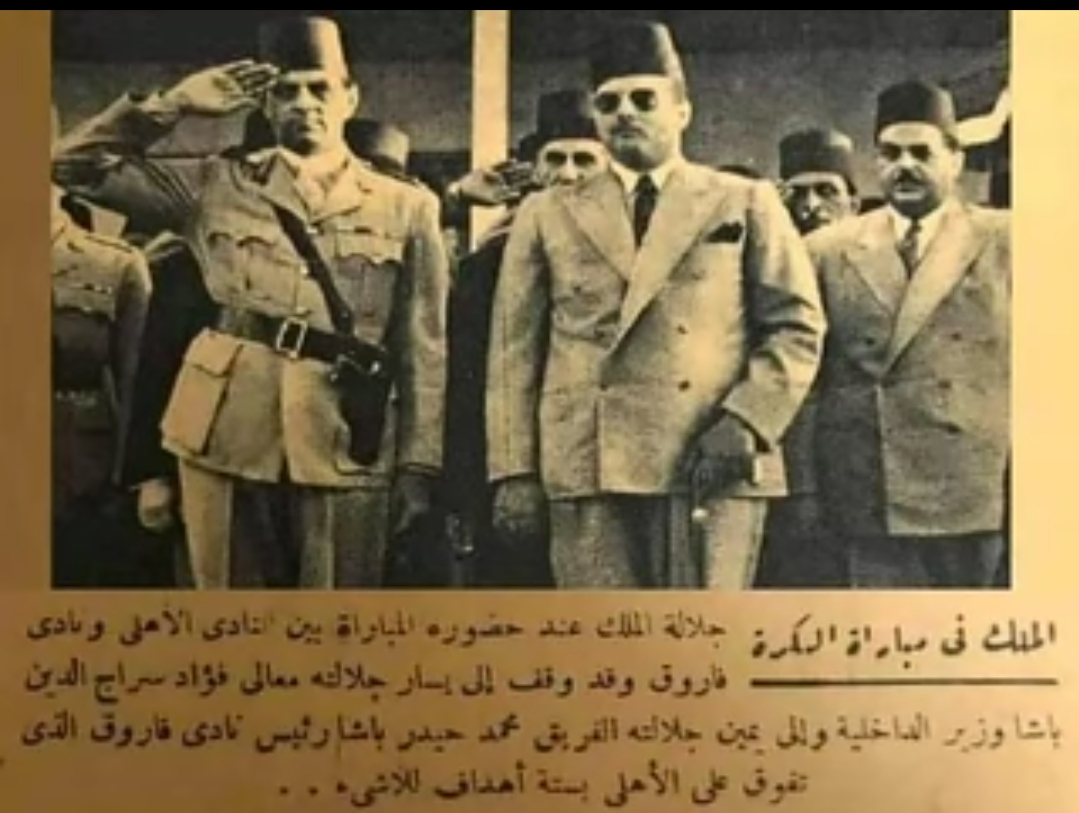
Haidar Pasha (left) with King Farouk I, the Honorary President of Zamalek SC attending the 1944 Egypt Cup final, ended with the largest win in the history of the Cairo derby with a 6–0 win for Zamalek, 2 June 1944

In 1944, Mohammed Haidar Pasha persuaded King Farouk to attend the Egypt Cup final at the stadium and the King agreed. King Farouk was photographed while watching the 1944 Egypt Cup final, while Zamalek won Al Ahly by a score of 6–0 and won the cup. This period witnessed the biggest victories in the history of the Cairo derby (contested with Al Ahly), a pair of 6–0 wins for Zamalek in 1942 Cairo Derby for the 1941–42 Cairo League and 1944 Egypt Cup final. This record scoreline in the Cairo derby has not been broken since.

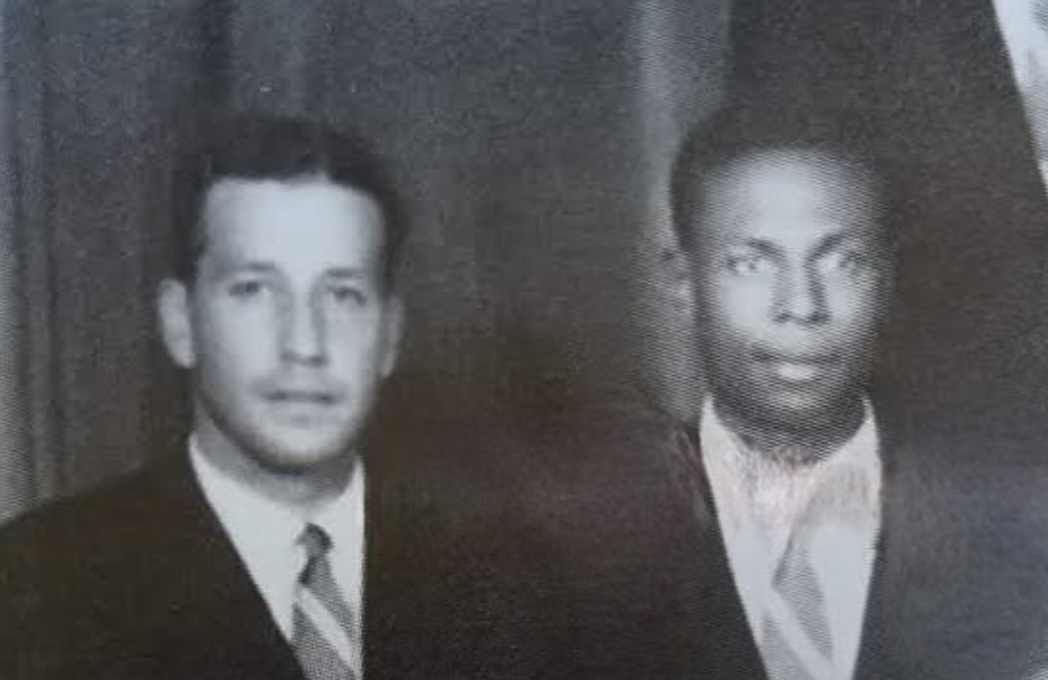
Yehia Emam and Hanafy Bastan, Zamalek's iconic players of the 1940s

In this period, a new generation of talents emerged in Egypt, the majority were Zamalek players, such as; Yehia Emam, Hanafy Bastan, Omar Shendi, Zoklot, Abdel-Karim Sakr, Halim Thalouth and Mohsen El-Sehaimi. Zamalek won the Cairo League for five times in the 1940s; 1940–41, 1943–44, 1944–45, 1946–47 and 1948–49. Stability in the top management of the club helped to succeed and achieve subsequent titles. Mohammad Haider Pasha was on the head of the Zamalek's administration for nearly three decades. Several football players moved back and forth from Zamalek and Al Ahly, however, each team has its own style and football strategy. Even the team's lineup itself was stable enough for a whole decade.

Abdel-Karim Sakr, who moved from Al Ahly to Zamalek in 1939 in a record transfer, played for Zamalek for 14 seasons, scored over 100 goals for the club. Zamalek's management thought that bringing Sakr to the team would not only help improve the team's attacking ability but also stop him from scoring in Zamalek. Sakr was a prolific goal scorer and helped the team in the 1940s in winning several titles and winning as well the Cairo derby. Sakr is the only player who scored in both matches against Al Ahly that finished by a score of 6–0 for Zamalek in 1941–42 Cairo League and 1944 Egypt Cup final.

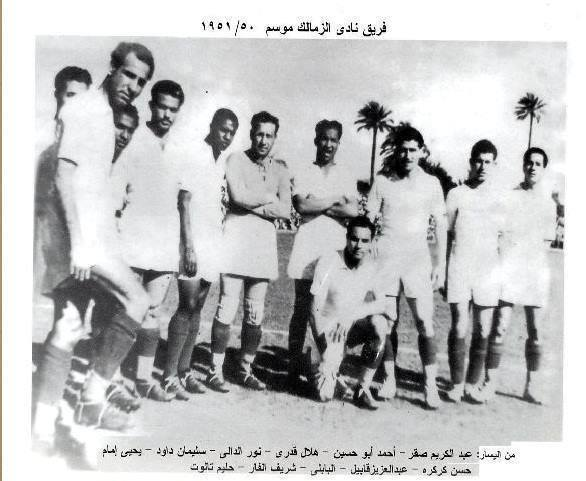
Zamalek football team in the 1950–1951 season

In 1948, the newly formed Egyptian League was launched, Zamalek played against Al Masry in the first match on 22 October, and Zamalek won by a score of 5–1. The first goal in the history of the Egyptian League was scored by Zamalek's Mohamed Amin, and the first hat-trick was scored by Zamalek's Saad Rustom. Despite not finishing the first two seasons in a good position in the league, Zamalek won the Cairo League for three consecutive seasons. In the 1948–49 Cairo League, Zamalek won the league with narrow margin. In the beginning of the 1950s, Zamalek won the Cairo League for three consecutive seasons; 1950–51, 1951–52 and 1952–53, tying with Al Ahly with 14 titles each. Zamalek finished runner-up in the 1950–51 Egyptian League, winning 11 matches and the champions; Al Ahly won 10, with both finishing with 25 points out of 18 matches, Zamalek lost the title to goal difference. In the 1952 Egypt Cup final, Zamalek defeated Al Ahly in the final with a score of 2–0, Sharif El-Far scored the two goals, Zamalek won their 8th title.

=== Post-1952 period (1952–1960) ===
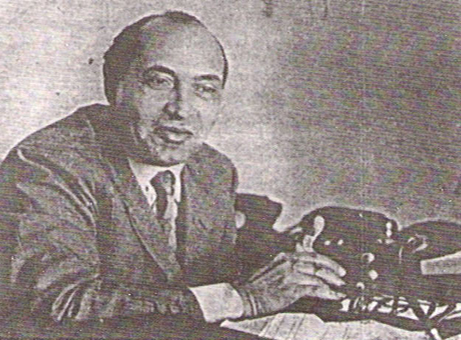
Abdel-Latif Abu-Rajelha, Zamalek's 8th president

After the 1952 revolution, and on 18 August 1952, the club's president, Mohammed Haidar Pasha, announced the change of the club's name to Zamalek, retrospectively starting 23 July, after the area where the club was situated. Renamed after Egypt's Zamalek Nile Island, one of the most prestigious areas of the capital and the word itself is an Egyptian-slang of the classical and standard Arabic word, (Arabic: ذو ملك, Arabic pronunciation: [Zu-Molk]), meaning Preciously owned. The club later moved for the last time to 26 July Street, and occupied an area of 35 acres (140,000 m^{2}) and hosted 24 different sports. A new board was formed with Mahmoud Shawky as president and secretary and Mohammad Hassan Helmy as assistant secretary. At the time, the rules required that half the club board be changed every year, and Helmy took the position of secretary-general. In 1954, the stadium needed renovations, so the board sought a businessman to take over the club and guide the renovation. Abd El Hamid El-Shawarbi became the president, and although he was elected for a second period, he was not able to do the job he wanted. Mohammed Haidar Pasha and Hagg Sayed El Annany contributed to forming the VIP stands and the first-class stands, which happened while El Shawarbi was outside Egypt. When he returned, he resigned and the board continued after Shawky stepped up from his deputy position to continue till September 1955.

Businessman Abdel-Latif Abu-Rajelha became the club president in 1956. By 1956, the rules had been changed allowing the board to stay for three years. Shawky stepped down for Abo Regeila, although he was re-elected as a club president. Although Abu-Rajelha was re-elected for a second term, he had to leave Egypt after he lost money from the governmental policy of nationalization against private property. The club continued to search for another businessman, and chose Alwe El Gazzar, the owner of El Sheikh Sherieb Company and the president of the board of directors of The Coca-Cola Company in Egypt at this time.

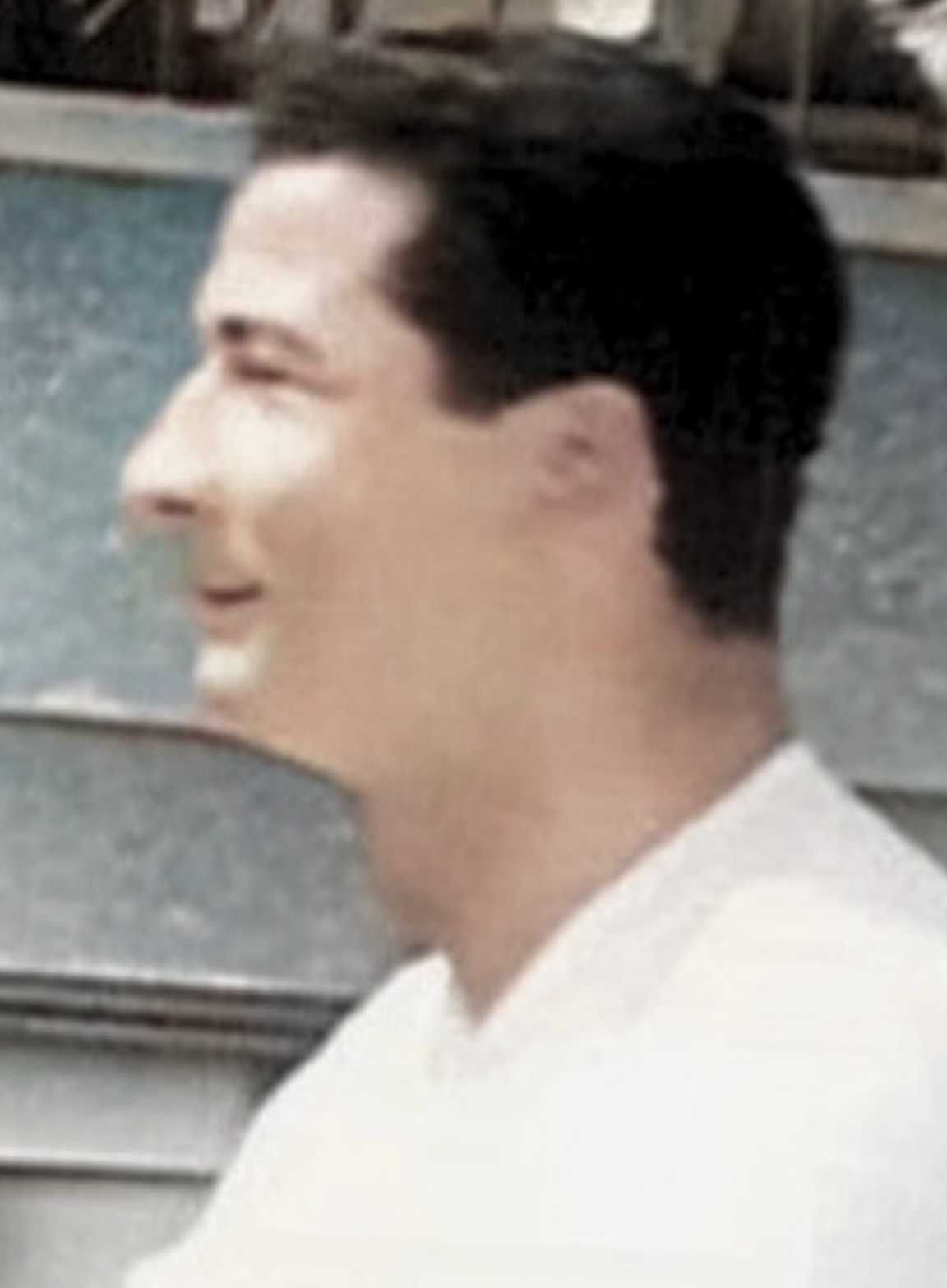
Essam Baheeg, Zamalek's icon of the 1950s, led the team to the league and cup titles as a player and coach

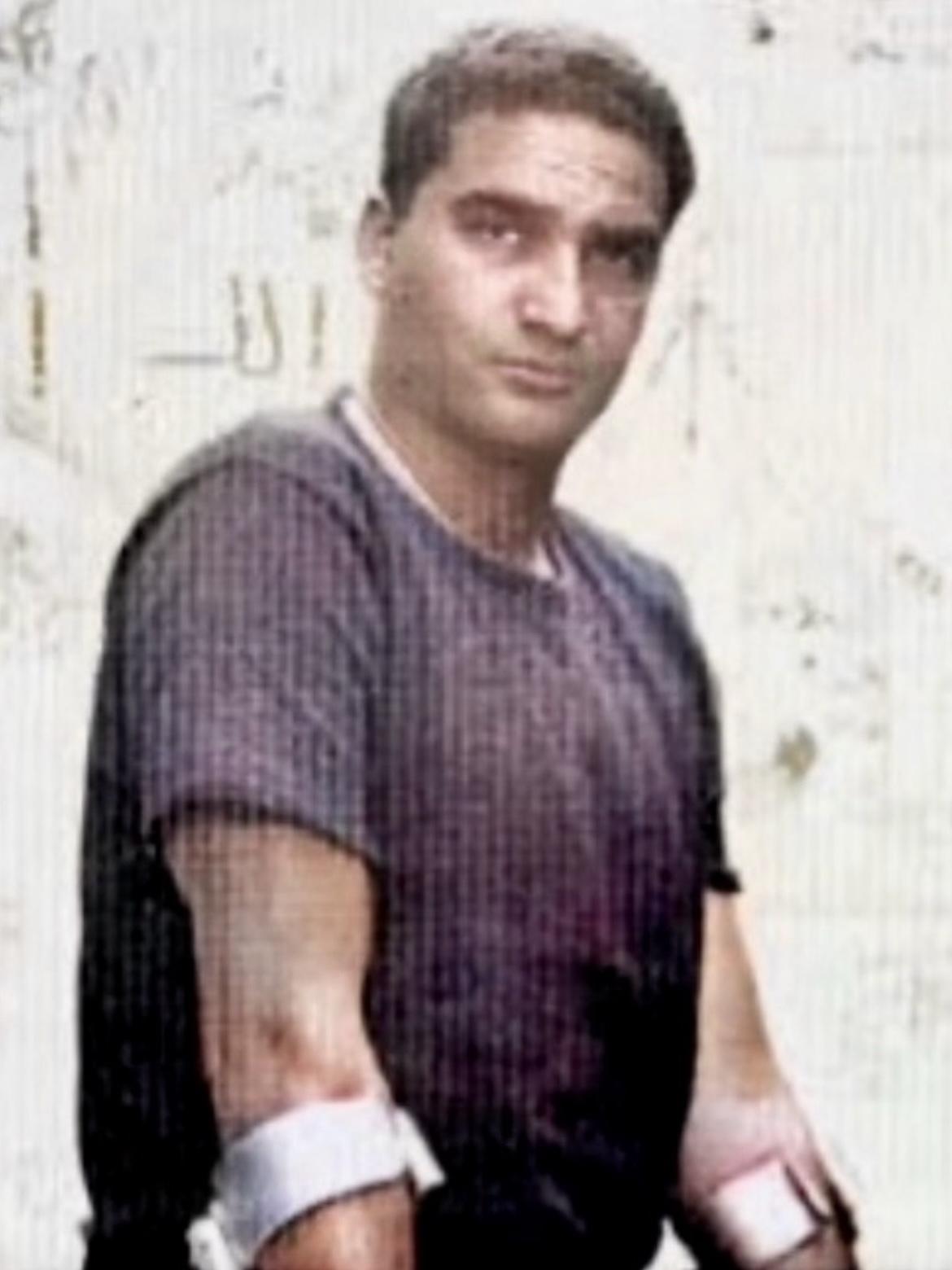
Abdou Noshi, Zamalek's iconic midfielder

Essam Baheeg was arguably Zamalek's most valuable player in the 1950s, and credit for his discovery in particular goes to Mohammed Haidar Pasha, the club's president at the time, as Haider Pasha included him in 1949 in the youth team when he was 18 years old. Quickly, Baheeg was able to secure a distinguished position in the starting lineup for the first team and the Egypt national football team as well, thanks to his talent and skills, and he gradually turned into an icon. Baheeg was known for his extreme loyalty and dedication to Zamalek, which increased his popularity among the club's fans and Egyptian football fans in general. He did not play for any other club throughout his 12-year football career, and is considered a symbol of the club throughout its history. Baheeg was a key player in the Egypt national football team and helped his country lift the African Cup of Nations trophy in 1959 by scoring the two winning goals in the final against Sudan. He became a head coach after retirement, and coached Zamalek in the 1980s for only one season and won four titles with the team.

This era saw the emergence of a new generation of players who besides their talents as footballers were known with their loyalty for Zamalek such as; Essam Baheeg, Alaa El-Hamouly, Sharif El-Far, Yaken Hussein, Samir Qotb, and Nour El-Dali. One of the fiercest Egyptian goal scorers of this era was Alaa El-Hamouly, he won with Zamalek seven titles of the Egypt Cup in his 13 seasons with the team, he is Zamalek's all-time top scorer in the Egypt Cup with 23 goals, he is also Zamalek's 3rd all-time top scorer of the Cairo derby with 9 goals after Mostafa Taha (12 goals) and Abdel Karim Sakr (10 goals).

In 1959, Zamalek bought Ali Mohsen, a Yemeni striker, he scored two goals in the 3–2 win over El Olympi in the 1960 Egypt Cup final and was the first non-Egyptian top scorer of the League's 1960–61 season. Zamalek won 6 titles of the Egypt Cup from 1952 to 1960, starting with 1952 through 1955, followed by four consecutive titles in; 1957, 1958 (shared), 1959 and 1960. The club won the Cairo League for 3 consecutive seasons; 1950–51, 1951–52, 1952–53, the tournament was stopped til the final season of 1957–58 and it was defunct permanently.

=== Sustained success (1960–1984) ===
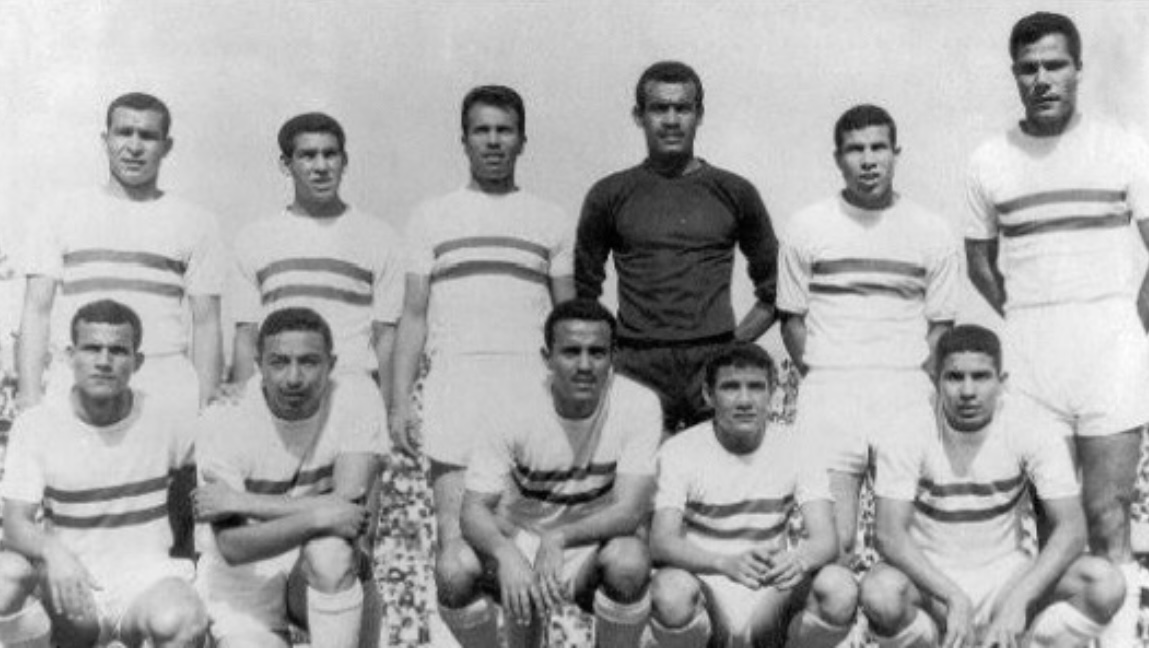
Zamalek's starting lineup in 1964

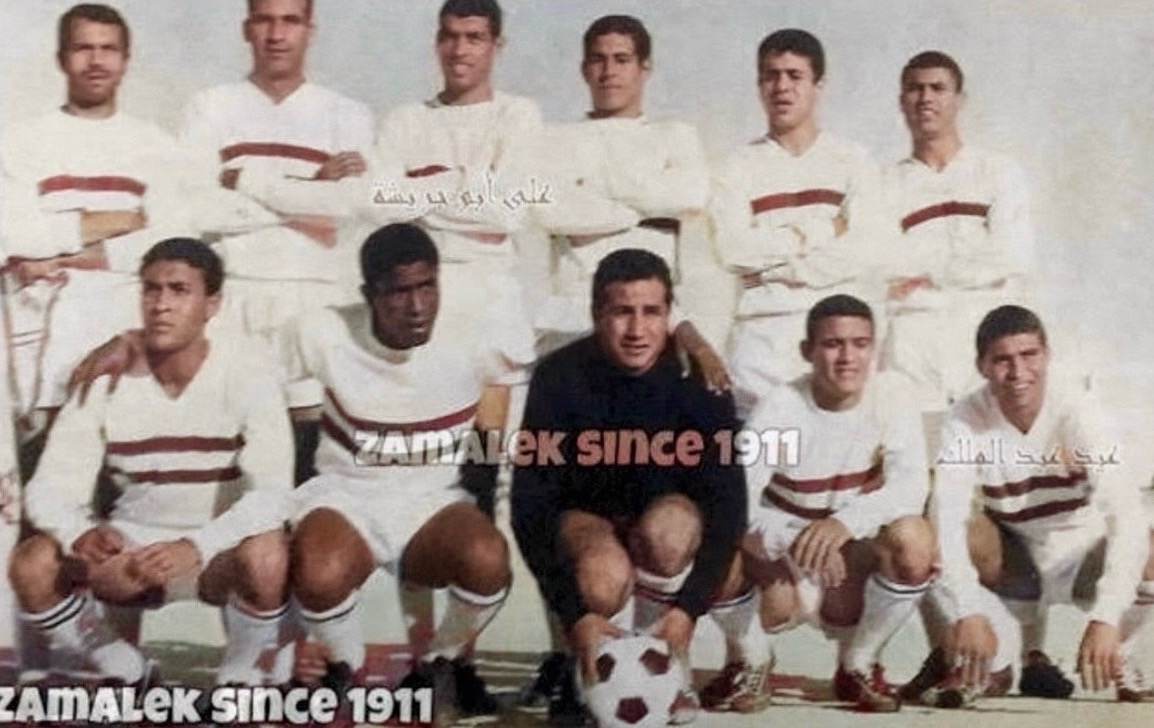
Zamalek's starting lineup in 1969

With the beginning of the 1960s, a new generation emerged in Zamalek and the Egyptian football, such as Ahmed Rifaat, Nabil Nosair, Hamada Emam, Raafat Attia, Abdou Noshi, Aldo Stella, Ahmed Mostafa and Mahmoud Abou-Regaila. This era was one of the first periods in which competitions and conflicts occurred between Zamalek and Al Ahly, due to a number of writers publishing articles that inflamed one party at the expense of the other. Al Ahly was then going through a difficult period in its history, and there were a large number of issues related to corruption that struck the Egyptian sports field, which were embodied by the journalist writer Yusuf Sibai in one of his novels and several articles.

Abu Regeila was an Egyptian businessman and pioneer of public transport buses in Cairo. During his reign, the construction of the Zamalek Stadium was completed in 1959, as well as the social building. Abu Regeila stayed in office as the club's official president until 1961. Hamada Emam was a popular player of the club in this era who helped sustain the club's profile. In 1961, Zamalek invited Real Madrid to play a friendly match in Cairo on the occasion of celebrating the Golden Jubilee for the club's establishment, the match took place on 10 March 1961 at Cairo Stadium. In 1962, there was a new board came to power with Hassan Amer as a president, emeritus deputy Mahmoud Shawky, Mohamed Latif, Galal Kereitam, Mahmoud Emam, and Mahmoud Hafez, as board members. Amer remained as president until the 1967 War.

In 1966, Zamalek invited West Ham United F.C. to play in Cairo, West Ham were the title holders of the 1964–65 European Cup Winners. Zamalek made a phenomenal match and hammered the European champions with a score of 5–1, at a time when the English club was at the peak of its glory and playing in its ranks were six of the stars of the England national team, headed by Bobby Moore. Hamada Emam scored a hat-trick, Taha Basry and Abdel-Karim El-Gohary scored the other two goals.

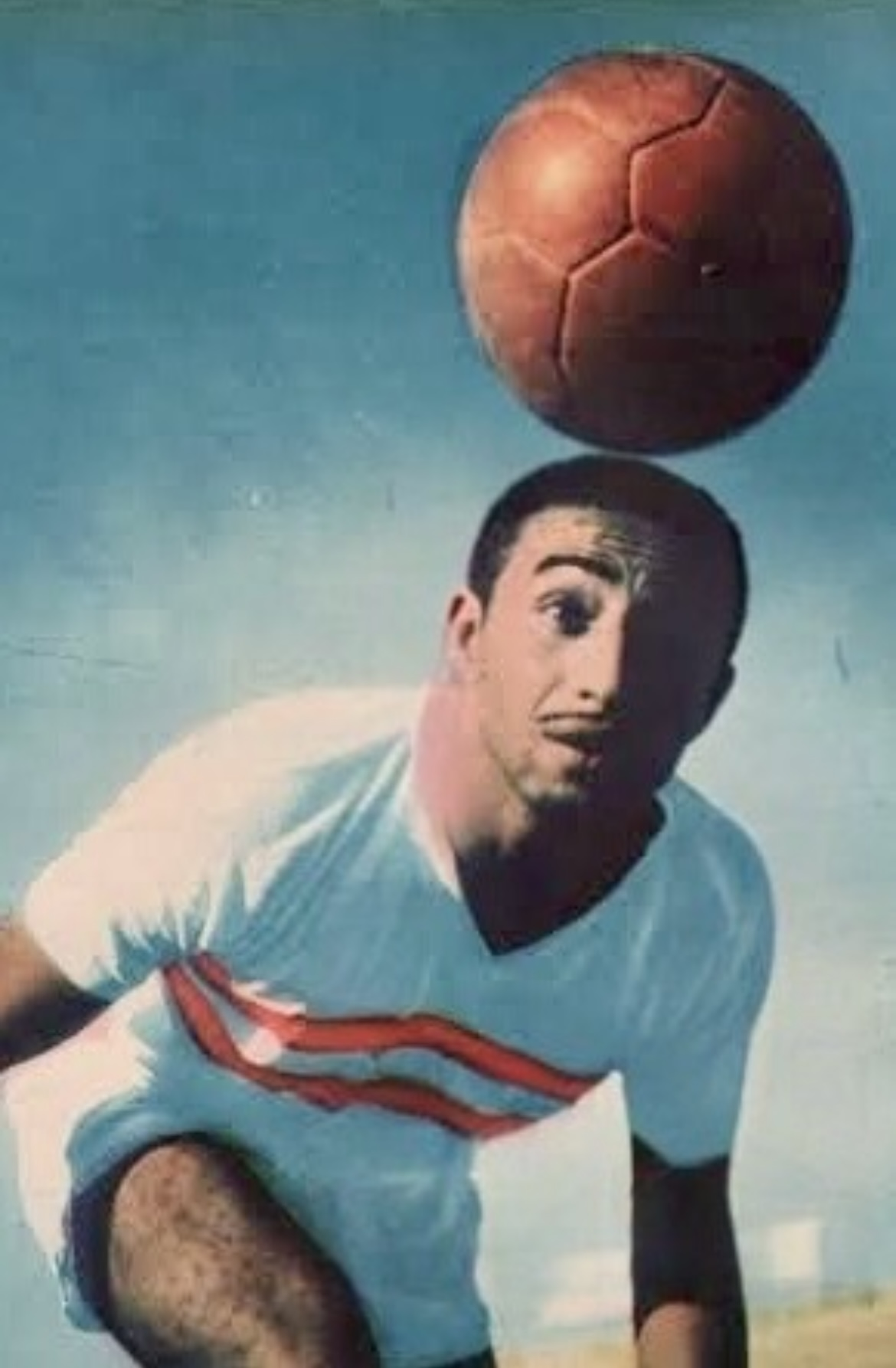
Hamada Emam, Zamalek's forward in the 1960s, nicknamed the "Fox"

After the 1967 war, Zamalek hosted Ismaily SC and Al Masry SC clubs, as well as the other Suez Canal teams at its grounds. In 1967, Minister of Youth and Sports Talaat Khairy decided that the club boards would be appointed rather than elected, and Mohamed Hassan Helmy, popularly known as Helmy Zamora, took over the presidency and was the first Egyptian sportsman to become a president of a club. He remained as president until July 1971 where the rules were changed to allow board elections again and to forbid anyone from being president if they had already held to presidency for two consecutive terms. Tawfeek El Kheshen took over the presidency and the honorary presidency was given to Mohamed Hassan Helmy.

In 1973, Mohammed Hassan Helmy was re-elected president. Helmy is one of the most famous figures of Zamalek. He joined Zamalek in 1934 as a player in the youth team, he played for 14 years in Zamalek. he won the Cairo League for six times and the Egypt Cup for five times. He was a member of the Egypt national football team. After his retirement, he began his administrative work as a member of the Zamalek Football Committee in 1948, and four years later he was chosen as general secretary of the club in the first general assembly in Zamalek. Then he was appointed full-time director of the club in 1966, in the same year in which he was elected as board member. He held several administrative positions in the Egyptian Football Association, including his presidency of the Competitions Committee and the Technical Committee. In May 1978, he served as president of the Egyptian Football Association. Helmy served as Zamalek's president from 1967 through 1984, except a year in 1971–1972 of El-Kheshen. Helmy also held the position of the president of the Egyptian Football Association. He was primarily credited with establishing most of the facilities of the Zamalek Club. He was famous for his volunteer work, as he refused any pay for his role in the club.

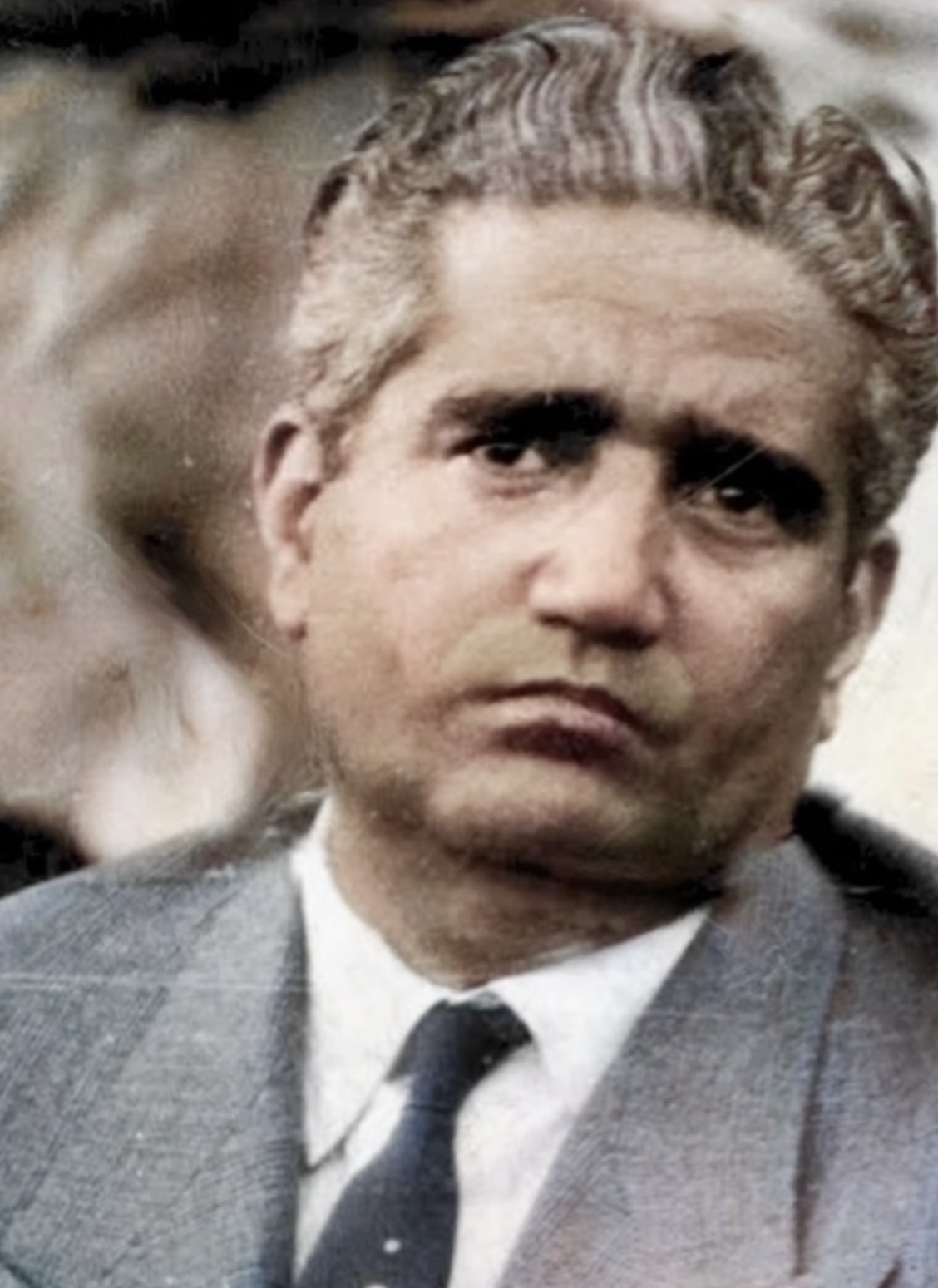
Helmy Zamora, second longest serving president, first Egyptian footballer to become a club's president. The club's old stadium (current training ground) is named after him.

The 1970s football team was one of the best generations of football in Zamalek, and it included legendary players in the history of Egyptian and Arab football. This era's team included talented players such as Taha Basry, Hassan Shehata, Ali Khalil, Farouk Gaafar, Ibrahim Youssef, Mahmoud Saad and Mahmoud El-Khawaga. In the 1975 Egypt Cup final, which Zamalek played against Ghazl El Mahalla, finished in a victory for Zamalek with a score of 1–0, Hassan Shehata scored the winning goal giving his team their 15th title and himself the 1st. Shehata and his colleagues led their team to the 1977–78 Egyptian Premier League title. Hassan Shehata is arguably one of the greatest footballers in Egyptian football history. He is one of the icons of Zamalek throughout its long history. He was called the "Master" for his dribbling skills and goals. He was the Egyptian League top scorer for two seasons in 1976–77 and 1979–80, he scored 108 goals for Zamalek. He was included in the Egypt national football team in 1969, where he played his first international match and since then, he was in the starting lineup until his retirement. Besides his honours with the club, Shehata won the EFA Egyptian Player of the Year award in 1976, and was awarded the Order of the Republic (first class) in 1980. Shehata worked as a head coach after his retirement, and as an Egypt's head coach, he won with the Egypt national football team three consecutive African Cup of Nations titles. Zamalek were still called "Qahir-al-Aganib" (the conqueror of foreigners), despite not playing against foreigners regularly. They met Bayern Munich on 21 December 1977 in a friendly match at the Cairo Stadium, Zamalek succeeded in defeating the Bavarians with a score of 3–2, and goals scorers were Waheed Kamel, Mohamed Taher, and Ali Khalil.

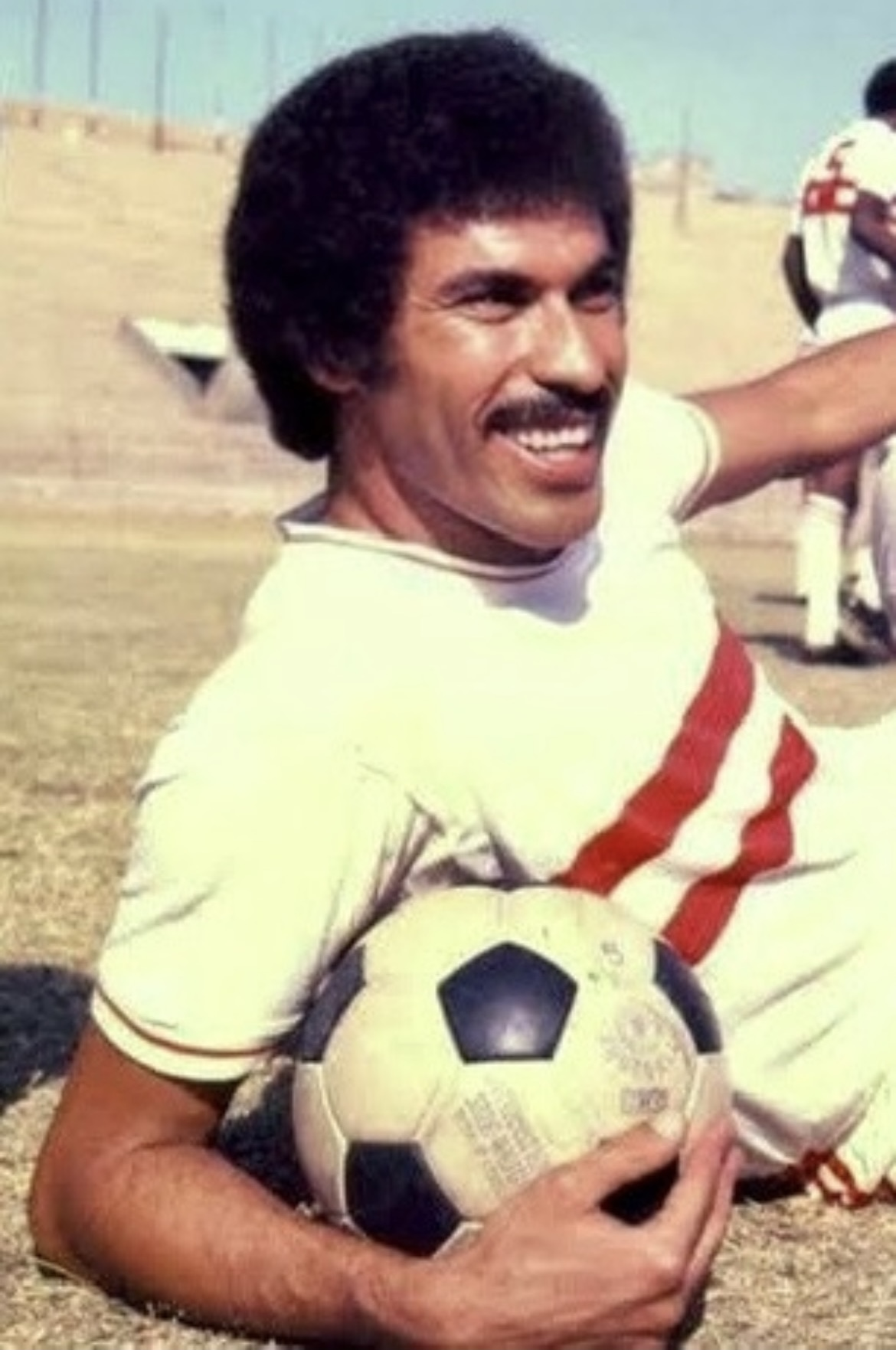
Hassan Shehata, Zamalek's iconic forward, nicknamed the "Master"

In the 1970s, several Zamalek players were football stars who can simply lead a team by themselves such as; Ali Khalil, who started his football career in Zamalek's youth team in 1969, and played for the first team in 1971. Khalil spent his whole career with Zamalek. He was an outstanding goal scorer who scored 94 goals for Zamalek in 9 seasons. Khalil was one of Egypt's most popular players of the 1970s. In the 1976–77 Egypt Cup, Zamalek faced Ismaily in the final and finished the match in their favor with a score of 3–1. Zamalek's goals were scored by Farouk Gaafar and Ali Khalil (two goals), Khalil was the cup's top scorer with 4 goals. He also scored in both in the 1979 Egypt Cup final. Nicknamed "Dangerous Ali", Khalil was the Egyptian Premier League's top scorer in 1976-77 and 1979–80 seasons. In the 1978–79 league season, Khalil had a famous incident of honesty and high integrity, when he scored an incorrect goal after he shot the ball which passed through the torn outer net and landed in the goal against Ismaily in a famous match. Unfortunately, this goal was important for Zamalek in the chase for the league title, however he encountered the referee Ahmed Bilal, the referee of the match, and told him that the ball was not a goal, and the goal was canceled after it had been awarded amid major objections from the Ismaily players and fans.

In the same generation, the midfielder Farouk Gaafar also started his youth career in Zamalek and spent his whole career with the club, was a rising star in the 1970s. He was a talented player with intelligence and football skills that made him a great player in the squad and in the Egyptian national football team. Nicknamed the "King of Midfield", Gaafar was the first captain in history to lift the African Cup of Champions Clubs in 1984.

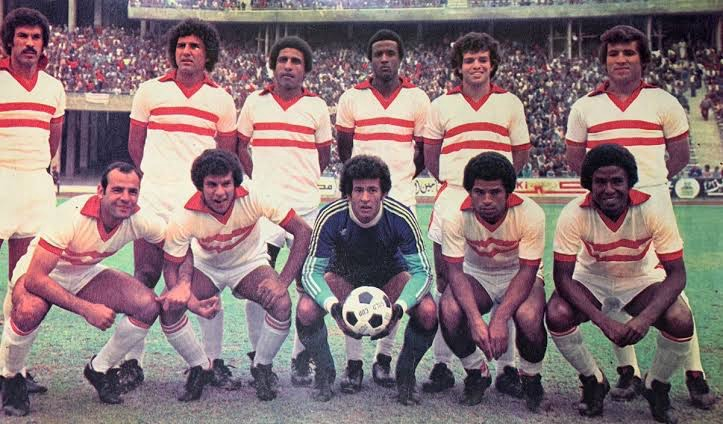
Zamalek's starting lineup in 1978

In the same era Taha Basry, the Egyptian "Eusebio", as media and audiences used to call him, who played in the 1960s, and after a spell in Kuwait, returned to Zamalek in 1974 to become the captain of the team that won the league title in 1977–78 season and the cup title twice in 1975 and 1977.

Zamalek won the Egypt Cup for another two times in the 1970s, in 1977 and 1979. Besides the Egyptian Premier League trophy in the 1959–60 season. Zamalek won the Egyptian Premier League in 1963–64, 1964–65, 1977–78, and 1983–84. The club also won the October League Cup, which is the tournament that was held as an alternative to the Egyptian Premier League after canceling the league due to the 1973 War and as Egypt was hosting the 1974 African Cup of Nations. Other trophies in this period include; 1963–64 Giza League, Friendship International Cup in 1970, Egyptian Television Cup (Defunct Egyptian Super Cup) in 1971 and 1982, and the Alexandria Summer League (Arabian competition) in 1982.

=== African Uprising (1984–2005) ===
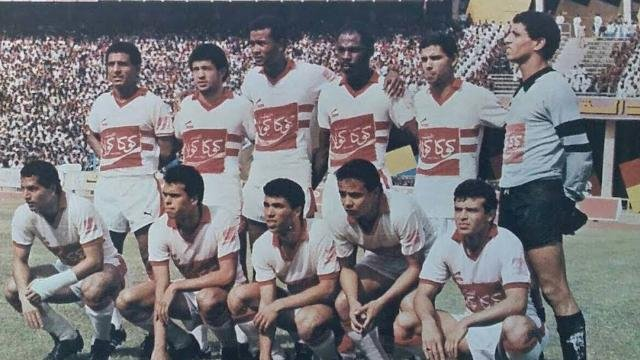
Zamalek SC team, winners of the first African Cup of Champions Clubs title for the club in 1984

Zamalek won the first African title in 1984 against Nigeria's Shooting Stars after beating them in Cairo 2–0 and in Nigeria 0–1. In 1984, Amer became president, followed by Hassan Abo el Fetouh in 1988 until 1990. In 1986, Zamalek won the 1986 African Cup of Champions Clubs, achieving their second title. In 1987, Zamalek won the Japanese side Furukawa Electric in the Afro-Asian Club Championship with Effat Nssar and Gamal Abdel-Hamid scoring the two goals, retaining the 1987 Afro-Asian Club Championship for the first time for an Egyptian club. In the 1987–88 season, Zamalek won the Egyptian League title with Essam Baheeg as the team's coach. Gamal Abdel-Hamid was the season's top scorer. He was a prolific goal scorer, and scored over 90 goals for Zamalek in his decade with the team. He is one of the all-time top scorers of the Egyptian Premier League. He was Egypt's captain in the 1990 World Cup. Abdel-Hamid is regarded as one of the best forwards in the history of African football.

In 1990, Galal Ibrahim became the temporary president of the club after Hassan Abo el Fetouh died in office, Ibrahim remained president until September 1990, when the general club meeting was held and Nour El-Dali was elected president. In 1992, Galal Ibrahim became the new president. Je remained in office from 1992 to 1996, and the rules were changed to require that the vice treasurer be selected mostly by the board members; Hamada Emam was selected by default to that position while Abdel Hamid Shaheen was elected treasurer. The board members were Ahmed Shereen Fawzy, Mahmoud Marouf, Mohamad Fayez El Zummur, Raouf Gasser, and Tarek Ghonaim.

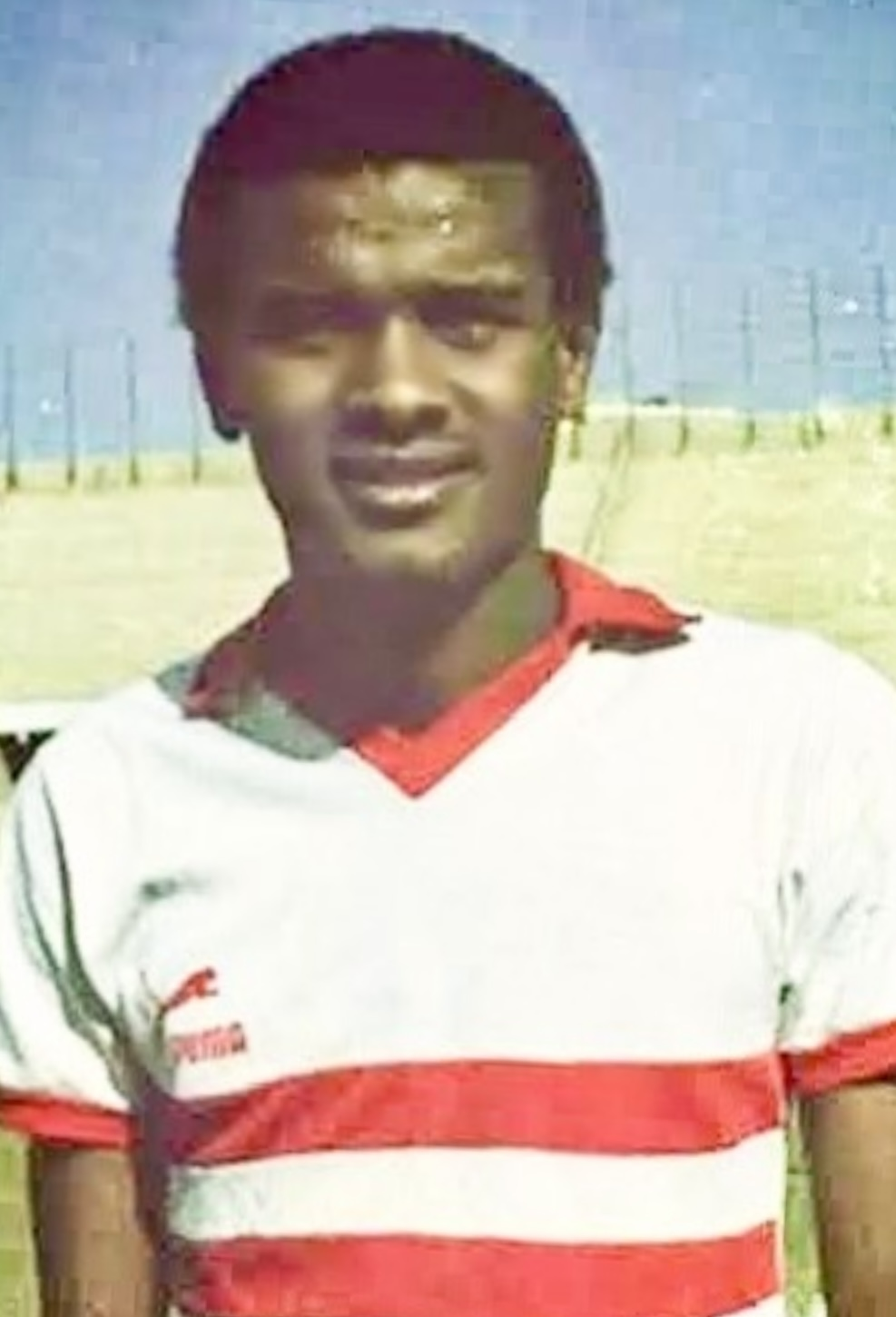
Ibrahim Youssef, Zamalek's defender nicknamed "The Black Deer"

The new rules required the board to have two members under the age of 30; for these two spots, Samy Abo El Kheir and Ihab Ibrahim were elected. The members appointed by the high committee for youth and sports were Mohamad Amer, General Hanafy Reyad, and Farouk Abo El Nasr.

In 1993, Zamalek won the 1993 African Cup of Champions Clubs final after beating Ghanaian giants Asante Kotoko, followed by the 1994 African Super Cup, which was the first time in history to be with two Egyptian contenders, Zamalek won Al Ahly in the African Game of the 20th Century by Ayman Mansour's goal.

By 1994, Shaheen was not able to continue his duties due to his sickness, but the board chose to keep him in the position in honor of his devotion to the club, and Farouk Abo El Nasr was appointed to take over his duties while Shaheen stayed in his position. In 1995, four members in the board were removed due to their six absences from board meetings: Mahmoud Marouf, Mohamad Fayez El Zummur, and Amer. They were replaced with Mortada Mansour, Mahmoud Abdallah, Mounnir Hassan, and Ibrahim Latif. The high committee for youth and sports objected on linking the appointed members with the elected ones, Hassan and Ibrahim Latif forfeited their positions. The newly two appointed members for the club board were Amer and El Nasr in support of their abilities and dedication. Fawzy was selected to be treasurer till the new elections.

On 4 July, Abd El Menem Emarah decided to release the club board and the Egyptian Football Association board after the game between Al-Ahly and Zamalek in 1995–96, and the board froze football activities in the club. A one-year temporary club board was selected with Kamal Darwish as president, Abdel Aziz Kabil as vice president, and board members Hanafy Reyad, Magdy Sharaf, Ismail Selim, Azmy Megahed, and Mohamad Abd El Rahman Fawzy. Accountant Mahmoud Badr El Deen was appointed as treasurer.

In 1996, Zamalek won their 4th CAF Champions League title, followed by the 1997 CAF Super Cup. In the same year, Zamalek won the South Korean side Pohang Steelers in the 1997 Afro-Asian Club Championship, to be the only team to win this championship for two times in a record never broken to date.

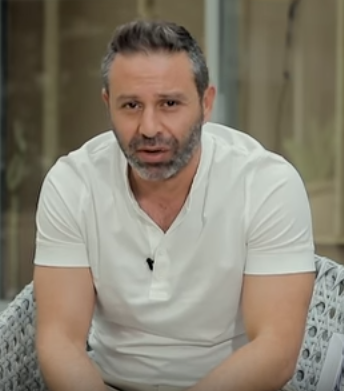
Hazem Emam, Zamalek's attacking midfielder, nicknamed the "Emperor"

Kamal Darwish was the president of Zamalek club for two terms from 1996 to 2005. Zamalek won 16 football titles during his reign, but overall he achieved 1186 championships in 24 games and he assumed the chairmanship of the board of directors in 2013 on a temporary board for the second time. He is the president with the most achievements in the history of Zamalek. In 2000, there was a friendly match between Zamalek and Palestine national football team in Gaza after breaking the Zionist siege. Zamalek was named the best club in the world by the IFFHS in February 2003. It was also the first Egyptian team to qualify for the 2001 FIFA Club World Cup in Spain, though that competition did not happen because of funding problems. Zamalek won the CAF Champions League in 2002, one African Super Cup title in 2003, and the first two championships in the Egyptian Super Cup in 2001 and 2002.

Zamalek is the only team to achieve seven championships between the 2002–03 and 2003–04 seasons, surpassing FC Barcelona, who won six championships in one year. Zamalek also won the Egyptian Premier League three times in; 2000–01, 2002–03 and 2003–04 seasons, the Egypt Cup in 1999 and 2002. Hazem Emam was the icon of this generation for Zamalek, he won 14 titles with Zamalek and won the 1998 African Cup of Nations with the Egypt national football team, and he was nicknamed the "imam of the talented players".

=== Regression (2005–2013) ===
In 2005, many boards were dismissed by the Minister of Sport, which led to organizational uncertainty from 2005 to 2013, and changed the form of competition in Egypt for years. The football team only won two titles in this period; the Egypt Cup in 2007–08 and 2012–13. Shikabala, Zamalek's winger, is one of the most prominent talents in the history of Egyptian football, who carried the banner of Zamalek and preserved the popularity of Zamalek in that difficult period, to become the most decorated player in the history of the club. The level of Zamalek continued to decline, and its administration destabilized since Mortada Mansour assumed the presidency of the club in 2005.

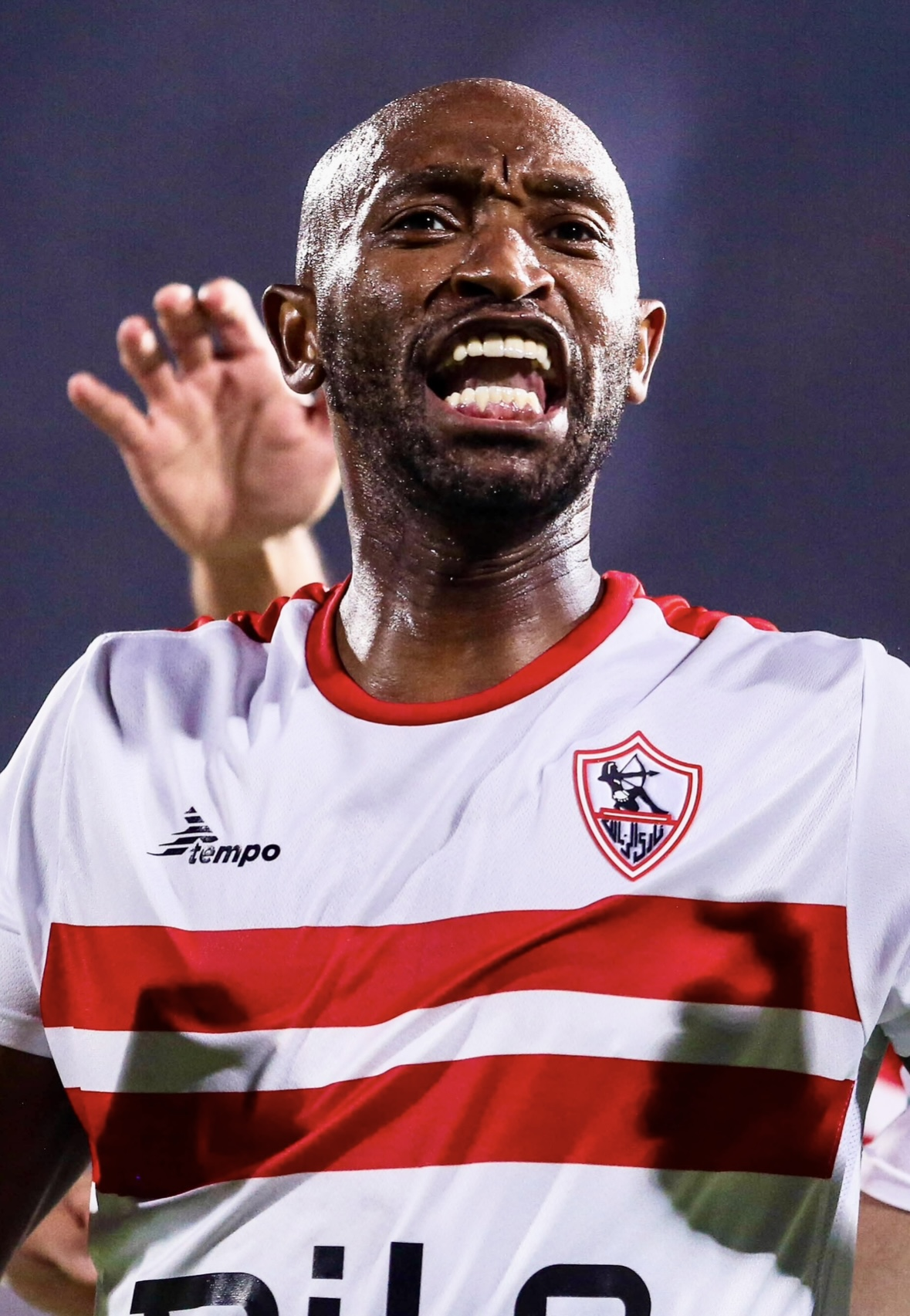
Shikabala, Zamalek's iconic winger, nicknamed the "Apache"

A new generation emerged in Zamalek in this era with several notable players at the Egypt national football team, such as Shikabala, Amr Zaki, Omar Gaber, Mohamed Abdel Shafy, Mahmoud Fathalla, and Mohamed Abou Gabal. Also several Zamalek’s players were a major part of the squad that won the Africa Cup of Nations for three consecutive times in 2006, 2008 and 2010.

The council did not last long and was dissolved, and a council headed by Morsi Atallah came to run the club before Mansour returned to head the council. Mansour dissolved the board of directors before restoring it, and the National Sports Council intervened to appoint a council headed by Muhammad Amir for a year before elections were held in May 2009, which resulted in the election of Mamdouh Abbas as the club's president; Abbas' council was dissolved in 2010 after Mansour obtained a court ruling stating that the elections were rigged. The administrative authority appointed an interim council to manage the club headed by Galal Ibrahim, before Abbas' council returned when Mansour abandoned his lawsuit. Taher Abu Zaid disbanded Abbas' council, and formed an interim council headed by Kamal Darwish to head Zamalek, but by appointment.

=== Reconstruction and reform (2014–) ===
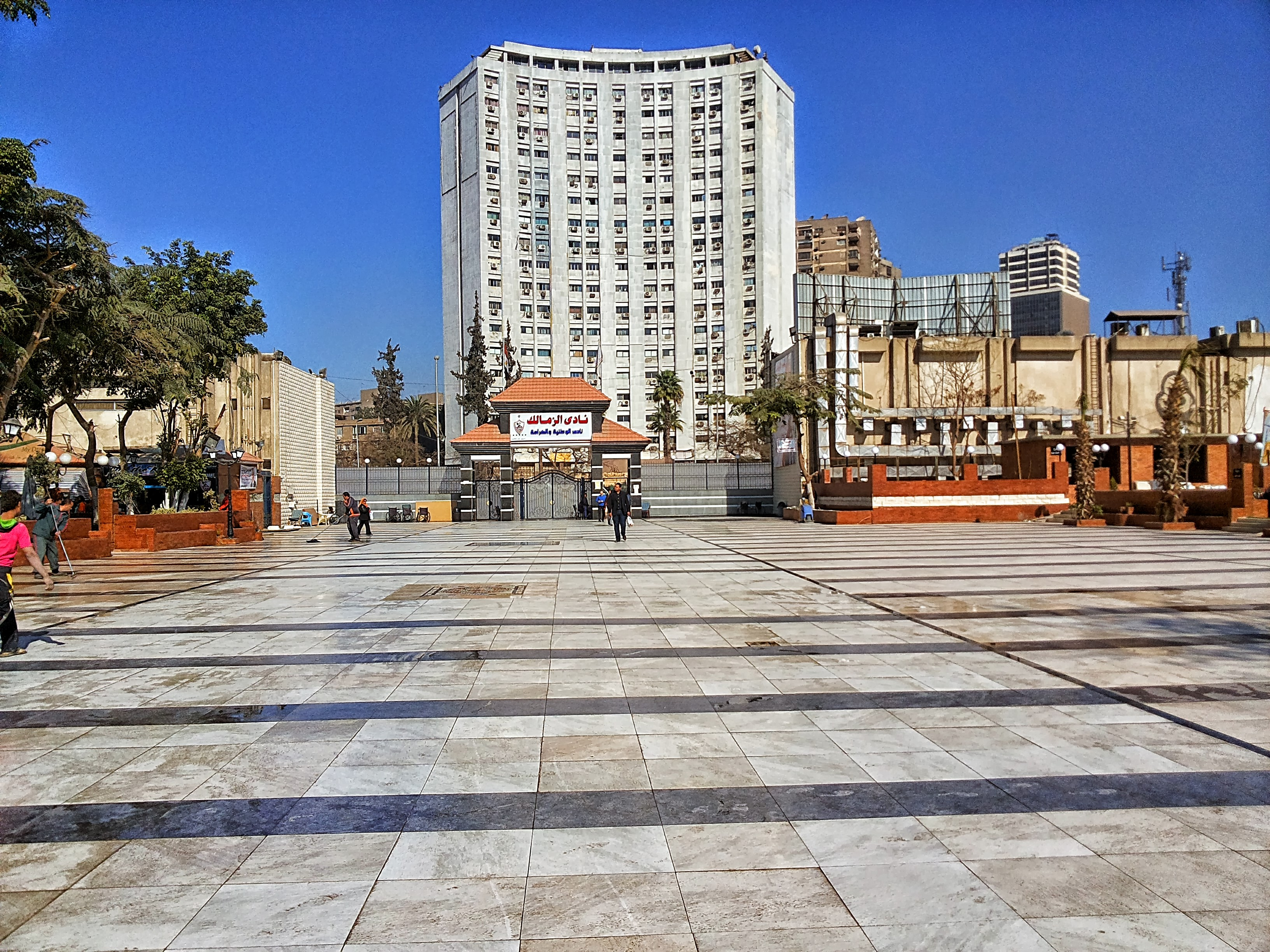
Zamalek Sporting Club headquarters in 2015

In 2014, Mortada Mansour won the elections on the club's presidency. Zamalek won the 2014 Egypt Cup, playing in the final against Smouha, and won 1–0. In the next season 2014–15 season, Zamalek won the Egyptian Premier League, and broke the record in obtaining the largest number of points in the league. The team won the 2015 Egypt Cup title at the end of the year, defeating Al Ahly in the final by a score of 2–0, and reached the semi-finals of the African CAF Confederation Cup in 2015. In 2016, Zamalek reached the finals in the CAF Champions League and won the 2016 Egypt Cup after winning Al Ahly again in the final and the Egypt Super Cup. In 2018, the Zamalek football team won the 2018 Egypt Cup again.

In 2019 Zamalek won the CAF Confederation Cup, the 2019 Egypt Cup, the Saudi-Egyptian Super Cup, the 2020 Egyptian Super Cup, and the 2020 CAF Super Cup. Since 2014, the football team won 11 championships, the last of which was the Egyptian Super Cup and the CAF Super Cup that were achieved in the span of one week. Mansour announced that "The trademark 'Real Football Club of the Century' is registered in the Ministry of Supply and Trade in Egypt." Zamalek sent a complaint to the Egyptian Football Association in preparation for escalating the case of the Century Club to FIFA and the International Sports Court.

Zamalek and RS Berkane squads in the 2019 CAF Confederation Cup final

The Ministry of Youth and Sports suspended Zamalek's board of directors due to financial violations on Sunday 29 November 2020. The Egyptian Ministry of Sports and Youth named Emad Abdel-Aziz as Zamalek's new president to succeed Ahmed Bakry, who died due to COVID-19. Then Hussein Labib has been appointed the new Zamalek president of normalization committee. And the team was able to obtain the Egyptian Premier League championship after the absence of six years from achieving the championship and Zamalek was also able to win the Egypt Cup in the same year, despite the difficult conditions that the club was going through in 2020–21 season.

On 22 November 2021, Mansour and his board of directors officially returned to Zamalek SC management, following the departure of the normalization committee until the club's elections. On 12 February 2022, Mansour became the president of Zamalek club for the third time, after the elections held by the club through the general assembly. In the 2021–22 season, the football team managed to achieve the Egyptian League for a second consecutive year and Egypt cup, despite the penalty of the International Football Association (FIFA) to suspend the players' registration. In the 2022–23 season, the club was suspended for the third time by FIFA, but maintained the main structure of the team.

On 19 August 2023, the Board of Directors of Zamalek submitted a collective resignation following the administration's failure to solve the club's crises and debts. This failure resulted in a ban on registering players, an inability to win most of the games and championships, and the cessation of work at the club's branch in 6th of October City. The Youth and Sports Directorate appointed Hassan Moussa as executive management of the Zamalek Club, Ahmed Fouad Al-Watan as financial director, and Ayman Abdel Moneim as director of sports activities. The Ministry of Youth and Sports announced, in an official statement, the replacement of Hassan Moussa, CEO of Zamalek Club, with Imad Mustafa El-Banani until the elections for the new Board of Directors are held.

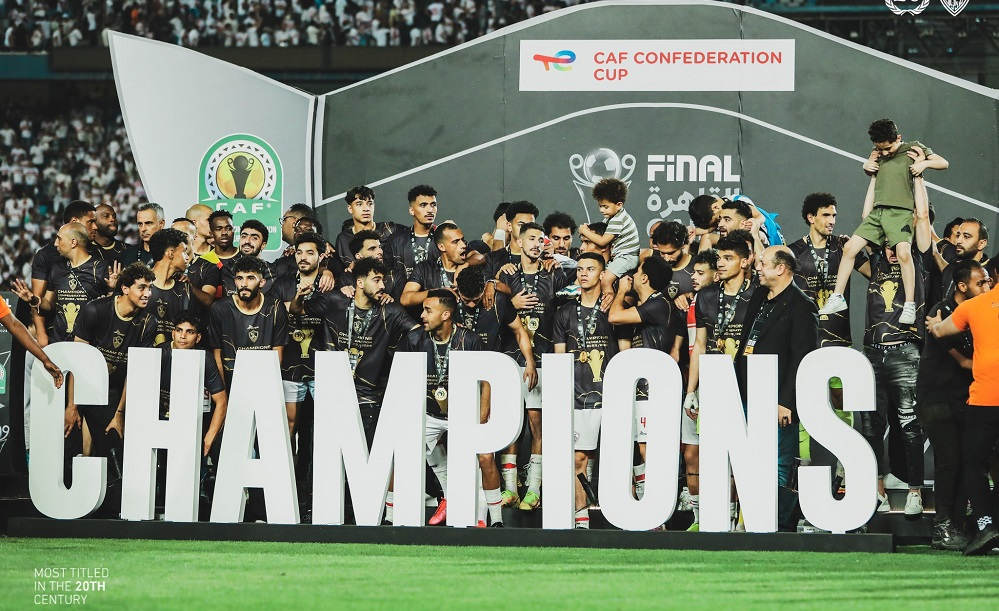
Zamalek SC team that won the CAF Confederation Cup in 2024

On 21 October 2023, the unified list, headed by Hussein Labib, succeeded in winning the elections of Zamalek Club, by a large margin of votes from their closest rivals in all positions, except for the position of vice president, which witnessed a fierce competition between Hisham Nasr and Hany El Attal, before the former won it by a margin of more than 400 votes, to start the White Club a new era with the Labib board for the next 4 years.

Zamalek SC have defeated RS Berkane on away goals to win the 2023–24 CAF Confederation Cup title for the second time in the club's history, the number of continental titles rose to 14. Zamalek have won the 2024 CAF Super Cup, to be the fifth title of the CAF Super Cup in the history of the club after beating Al Ahly 4-3 in a penalty shootout after a 1-1 draw at Kingdom Arena in Riyadh, Saudi Arabia in the famous match known as the African Super of the 21st Century.

Zamalek and Al Ahly squads in the 2024 CAF Super Cup

On 5 June 2025, Zamalek claimed the 2024–25 Egypt Cup after a dramatic 8-7 victory on penalties over Pyramids FC, following a 1-1 draw across 120 minutes. On 16 May 2026, Zamalek won the second leg match of the 2026 CAF Confederation Cup final by a score of 1–0, finishing 1–1 on aggregate, losing the title with penalties. On 20 May 2026, Zamalek secured their 15th Egyptian Premier League title, after defeating Ceramica Cleopatra FC 1–0 at the Cairo International Stadium.

== Crests and colors ==
=== Crests ===
In 1913, the Cairo International Sports Club "Zamalek" was the official name of the club, often stamped C.I.S.C on the team's white jersey. In 1941, the royal emblem of the Kingdom of Egypt and Sudan was the official emblem of the club at the time; when the club's name changed from "Mixed Club" to "Farouk Club" by royal order from Farouk I, who was a fan of the club.

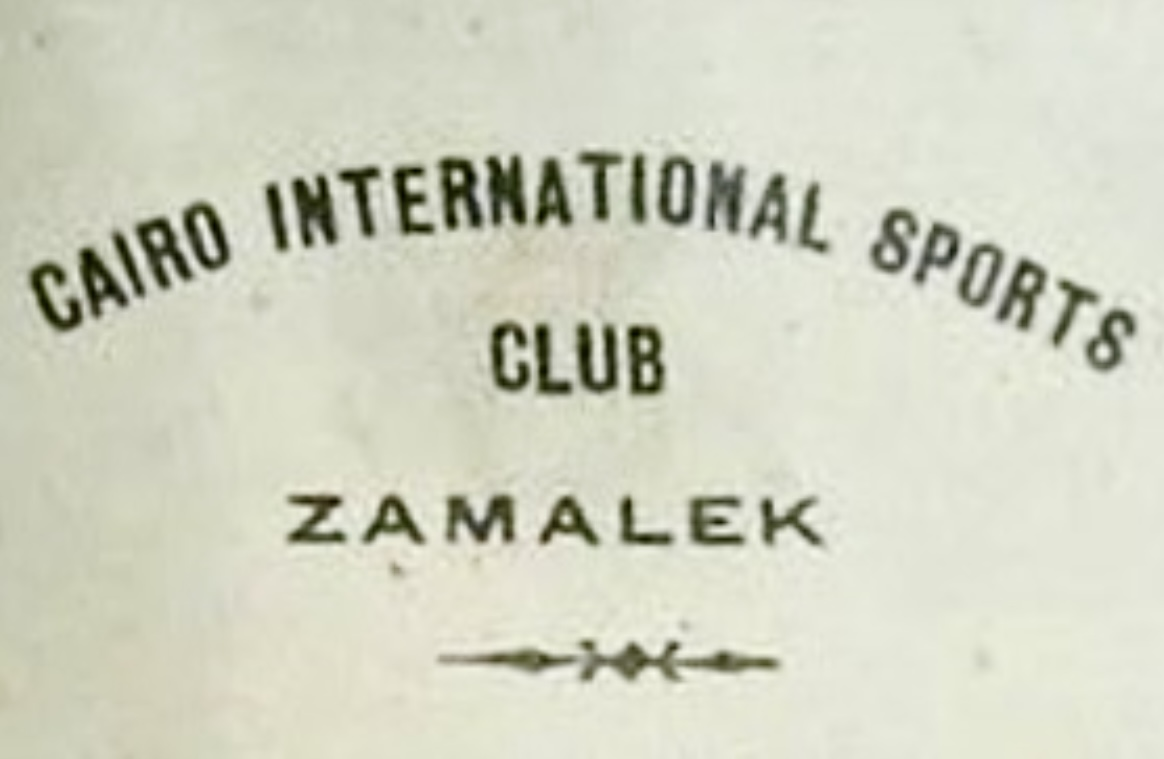
The Evolution of the Crest of Zamalek SC
1913–1941	1941–1952	Since 1952

After the 1952 revolution on the royal rule in Egypt, the club's name and logo changed; the logo became a mixture of the sporting model and the ancient Egyptian civilization. The logo's main colors express peace and struggle and have not changed since its establishment. The home jersey uses the original Zamalek colours. In the upper half of the logo, the arrow that points towards the target appears in a pharaonic uniform as an indication of the common goal between it and Zamalek.

=== Colors ===
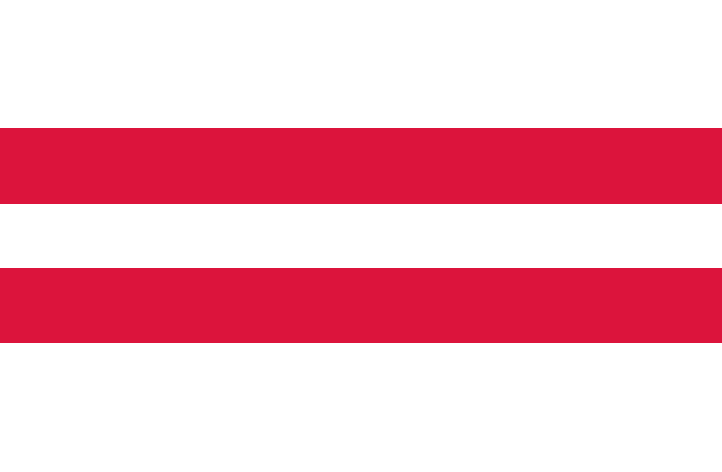
The two red lines on a white canvas, the traditional symbol of the club.

Zamalek is famous for the stability of its basic colors, which have not changed throughout the club's history. It is distinguished by a fully white dress with two parallel red lines in the middle. The parallel red lines traditionally have always been displayed on the chest part of the jersey.

=== Kit suppliers and shirt sponsors ===
Period	Kit manufacturer	Shirt sponsor
1979–1980	Hummel	None
1980–1981	Hummel	Toyota
1981–1982	Puma	None
1982–1984	Puma	Sport Cola
1984–1985	Puma	Coca Cola
1985–1986	Umbro	None
1986–1989	Adidas	Fanta
1992–1996	Venecia	Olympic Electric
1999–2001	Diadora	Philips
2001–2004	Adidas	Chipsey
2004–2005	Venecia	None
2005–2007	Adidas	SIPES
2007–2008	Venecia	KFC
2008–2011	Adidas	Ceramica Royal
2011–2012	Adidas	York
2012–2013	Adidas	Prego
2013–2014	Adidas	Twist
2014–2015	Adidas	SAIB Bank
2015–2016	Macron	SAIB Bank
2016–2018	Joma	TE
2018–2019	Puma	TE
2019–2021	Puma	SAIB Bank
2021–2024	Tempo	Nile Developments
2024 - 2025	ZAT	Nile Developments
2025–Present	Nike	Nile Developments

=== Kit evolution ===
Classic	1984	1992–1993	1994–1995	1996–1997	1997–1998

2000–2001	2002–2003	2005–2007	2008–2010	2011–2012

2012–2015	2015–2016	2016–2017	2017–2018	2018–2019

2019–2020	2021–2024	2024–2025	2025–2026

== Grounds ==
=== Helmy Zamora Stadium ===
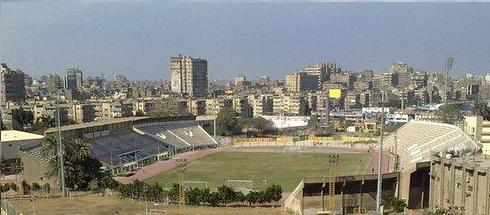
Helmy Zamora Stadium, the stadium is used as a training field for Zamalek SC first team.

Helmy Zamora Stadium, formerly known as Zamalek Stadium, is a multi-use stadium in Giza, Egypt. Originally, it was Zamalek's home ground, the stadium was developed over the years to become known as Helmy Zamora Stadium. In 1959, the stadium was officially opened and hosted a match between Zamalek and Dukla Prague on this occasion. It was named Zamalek Stadium, and was later renamed to the Helmy Zamora Stadium, after Helmy Zamora, a legend of the club. Zamalek continued to play some of their home games at Helmy Zamora Stadium.

In 1974, and after Zamalek's stadium disaster, the Cairo International Stadium became the main official stadium of Zamalek. Currently, the stadium holds the team training and friendly games. It was renamed in 2014 -2023 to Abdel-Latif Abu-Rajelha Stadium after the former president of Zamalek, Abdel-Latif Abu-Rajelha. The stadium could hold 40,000 spectators before the capacity was reduced to 20,000, and later renamed Helmy Zamora Stadium in October 2023. Currently, the football team is training outside the club.

=== Cairo International Stadium ===
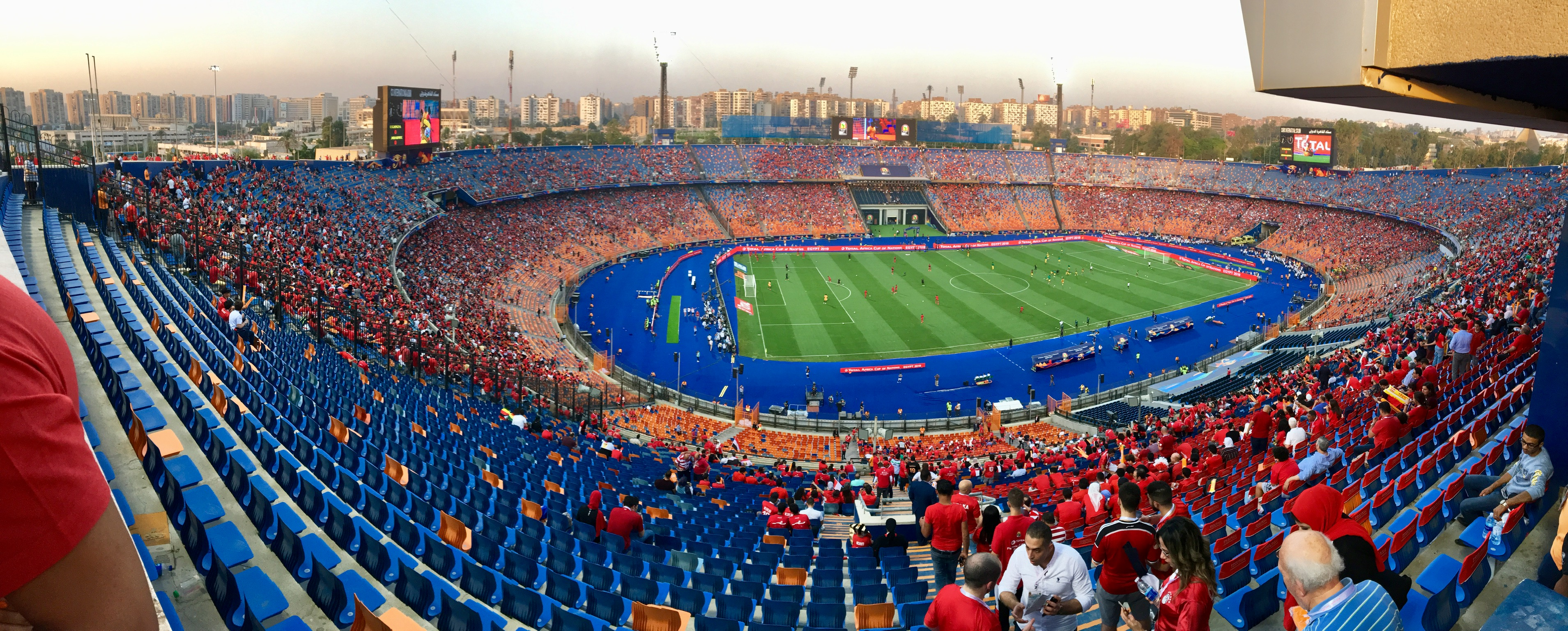
Panorama view of Cairo International Stadium

Cairo International Stadium in the home ground of Zamalek, as the Helmy Zamora Stadium is not suitable for hosting the first team's official matches due to its limited capacity, its central downtown location, and in need for renovations. The players train in Helmy Zamora Stadium but play their home matches in Cairo International Stadium for local matches and continental matches.

== Supporters ==
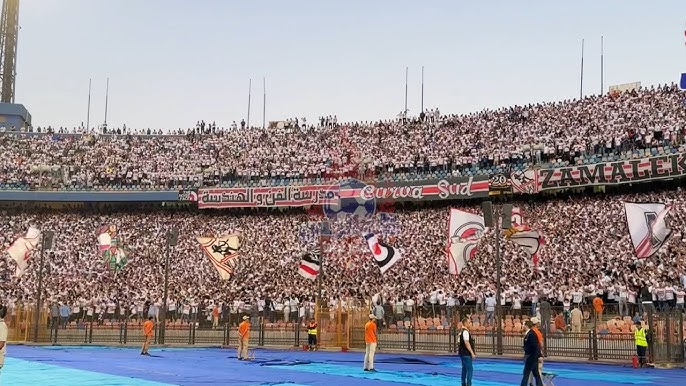
Ultras White Knights

Zamalek has an ultras group named the Ultras White Knights that was founded on 17 March 2007 and is known for its pyrotechnic displays. Their motto is "Brotherhood in blood and fans of the free public Club". They were involved in clashes on 8 February 2015 before the league match between Zamalek and ENPI Club at the Cairo Air Defense Stadium, where 20 people were killed.

=== Stadiums disasters ===
Helmy Zamora Stadium disaster 1974

At least 48 people died in a stampede at a friendly game against Czechoslovak club Dukla Prague at the Helmy Zamora Stadium in 1974.

30 June Stadium stampede 2015

On 8 February 2015, 20 supporters were killed by policemen outside the 30 June Stadium.

== Records and statistics ==
=== Most appearances ===
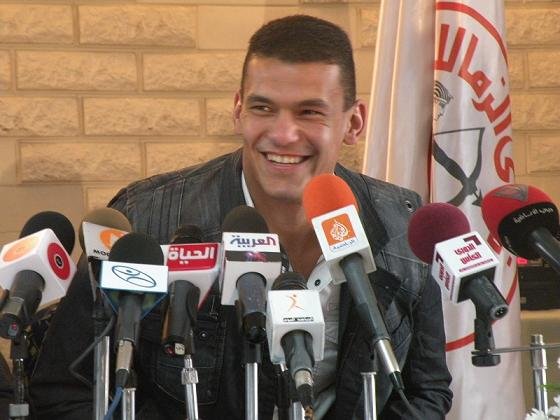
Abdel-Wahed El-Sayed, Zamalek's all-time leader in appearances

Rank	Name	Years	League	Cup	Super Cup	African	Arab	Total
1	(Egypt) Abdel-Wahed El-Sayed	1997–2014	345	40	4	88	27	504 (0)
2	(Egypt) Shikabala	2002–2005; 2006–2014; 2016–2017; 2019–2025	270	48	5	69	10	402 (70)
3	(Egypt) Abdel Halim Ali	1999–2009	219	27	3	58	32	339 (138)
4	(Egypt) Tarek El-Sayed	1995–2008	207	23	2	56	35	323 (26)
5	(Egypt) Mohamed Aboul Ela	1999–2009	144	27	3	51	31	248 (11)
6	(Egypt) Besheer El-Tabei	1997–2004; 2007–2008	146	21	2	42	22	223 (11)
7	(Egypt) Wael El-Quabbani	1999–2004; 2005–2007	126	31	3	38	3	231 (8)
8	(Egypt) Gamal Hamza	2000–2009; 2007–2008	145	17	1	33	33	229 (74)
9	(Egypt) Hazem Emam (footballer, born 1988)	2008–2016; 2017–2022	151	18	0	54	4	227 (10)
10	(Egypt) Mahmoud Fathalla	2008–2016; 2007–2014	145	12	0	47	0	204 (50)

=== Top goal-scorers ===
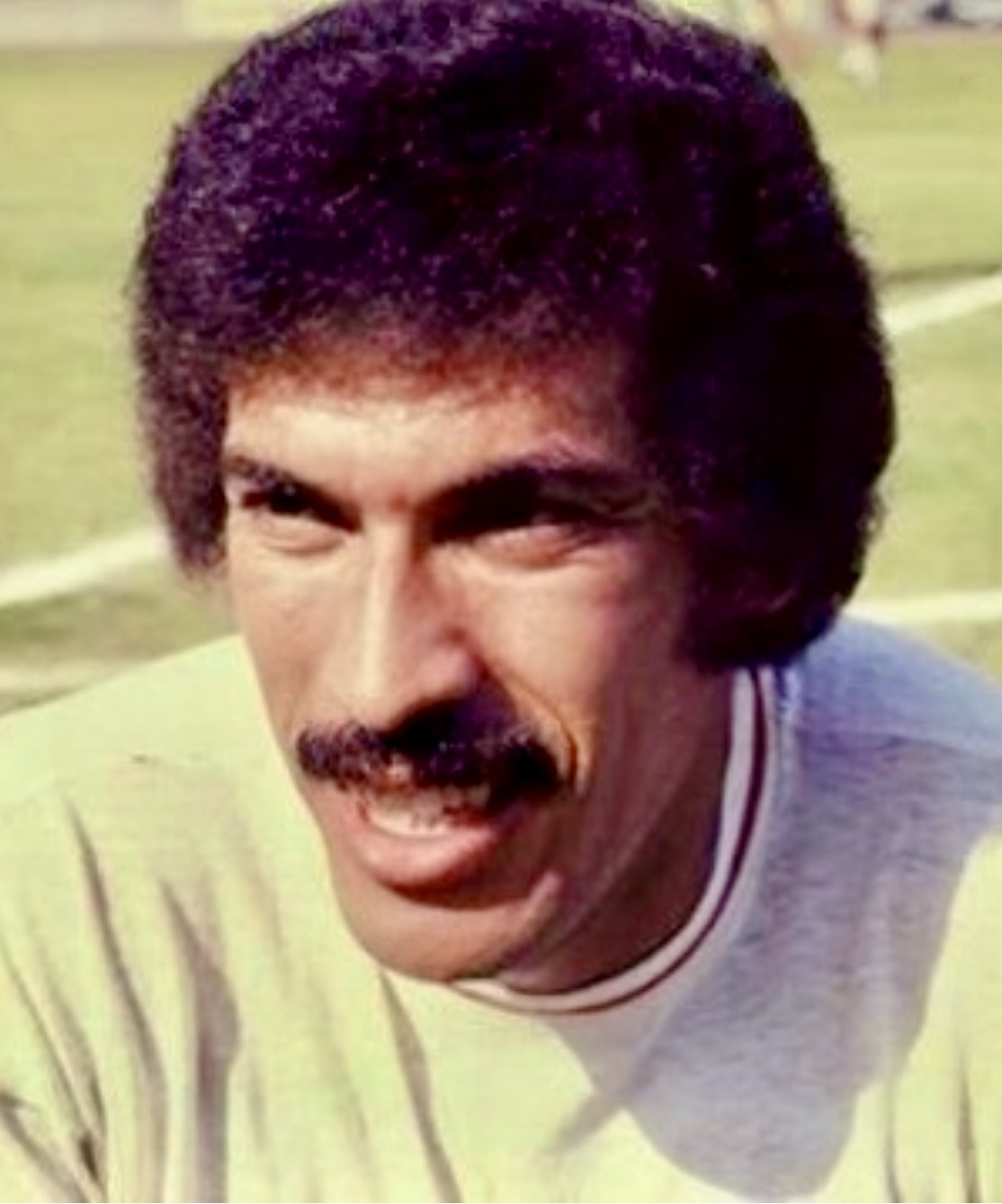
Hassan Shehata

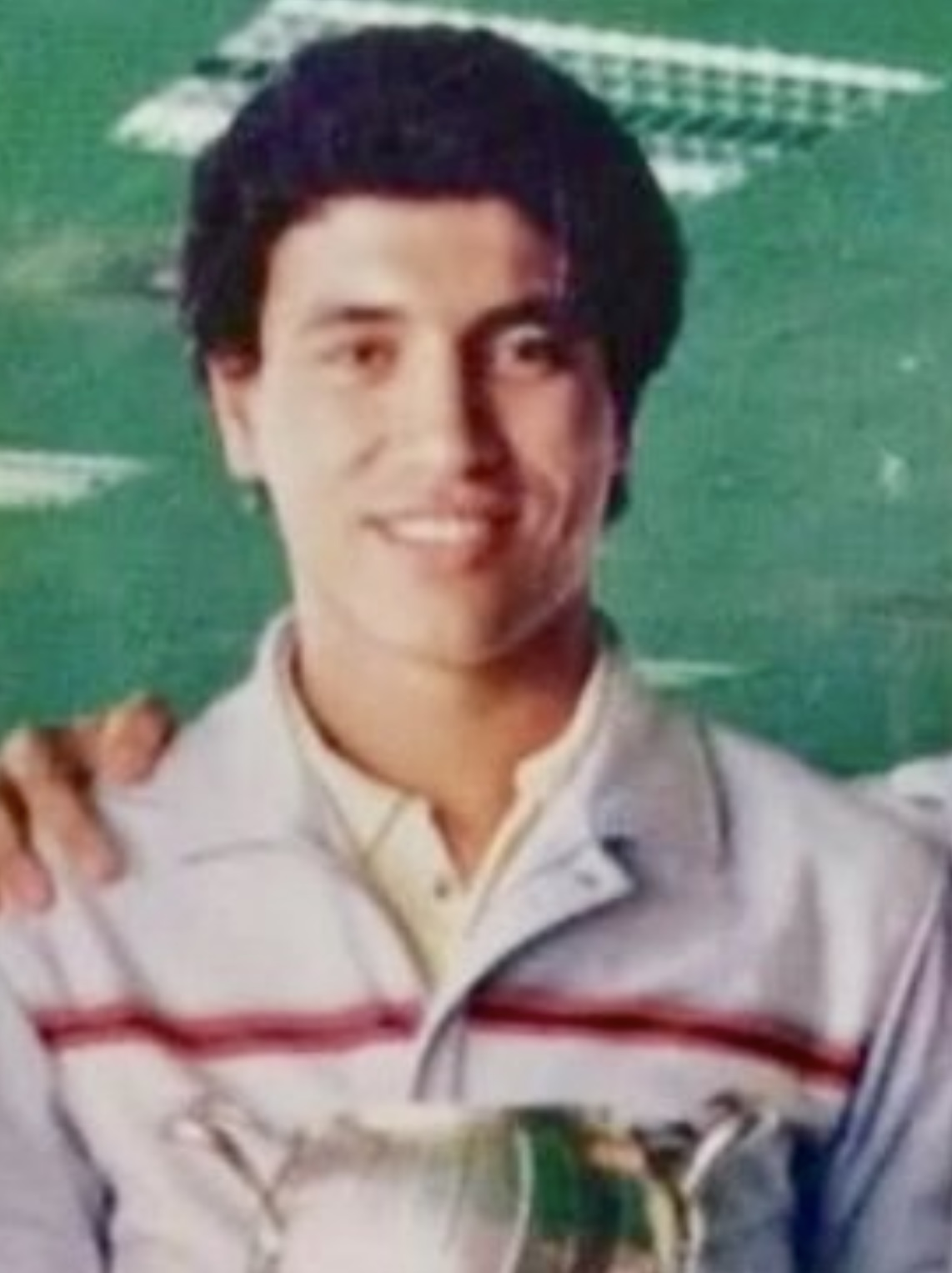
Gamal Abdel-Hamid

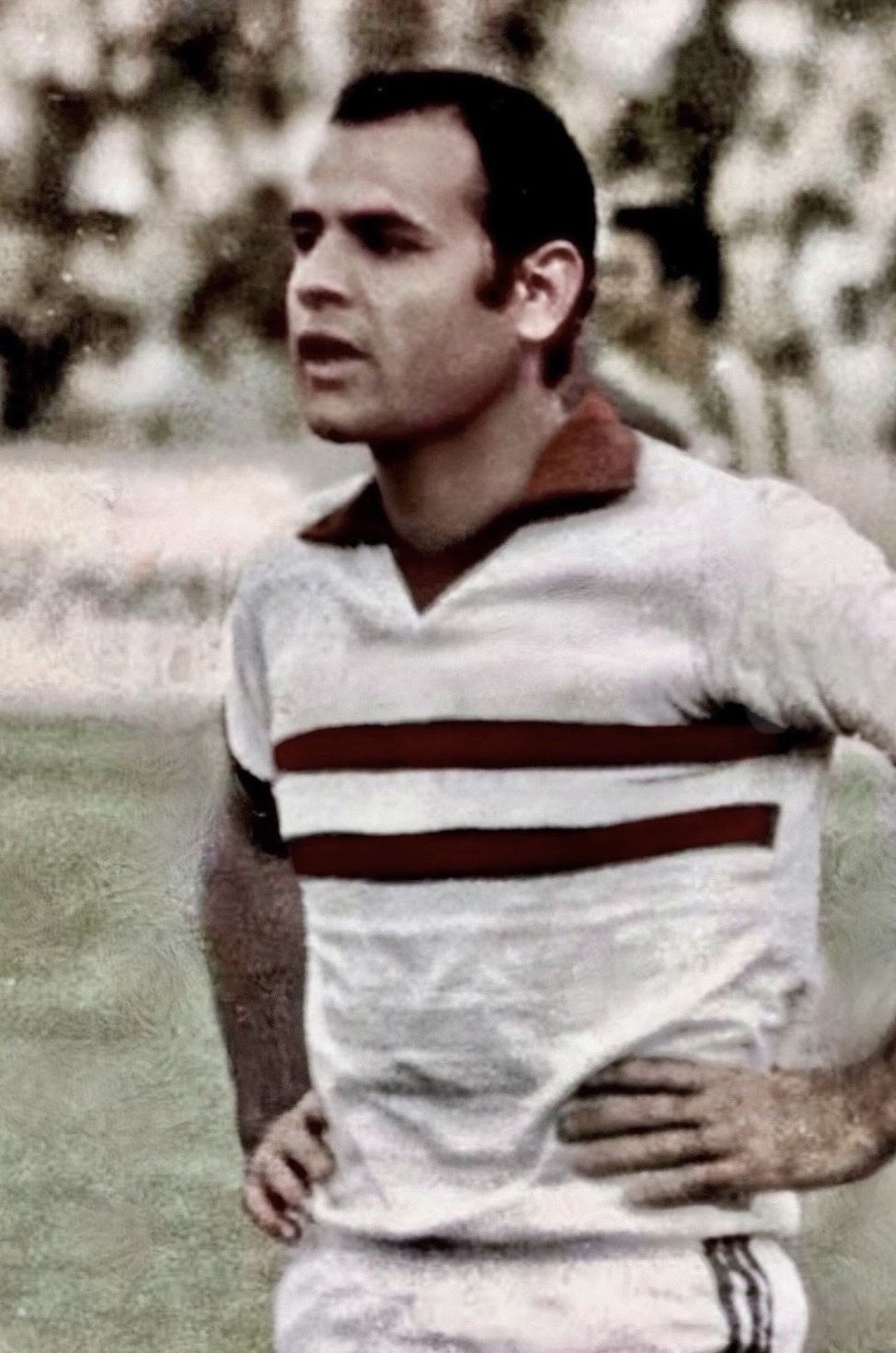
Ali Khalil

Rank	Player	Time	League	Cup	October League Cup	Confederation	African	Afro-Asian	Arab	Total
1	(Egypt) Abdel Halim Ali	1999–2009	81 (210)	18 (27)	0 (3)	0	23 (58)	0	23 (13)	135 (330)
2	(Egypt) Hassan Shehata	1966–1968; 1973–1982	77	10	9	0	6	0	0	102
3	(Egypt) Gamal Abdel Hamid	1984–1994	73	7	0	0	16	1	0	97
4	(Egypt) Ali Khalil	1970–1980	78	12	1	0	3	0	0	94
5	(Egypt) Alaa El-Hamouly	1949–1962	68	23	0	0	0	0	0	91
6	(Egypt) Ahmed Sayed	2019–2025	61 (164)	8 (16)	0	0	14 (17)	0	1 (3)	86
7	(Egypt) Hamada Emam	1957–1974	74	10	0	0	0	0	0	84
8	(Egypt) Gamal Hamza	2000–2009	46 (145)	10 (17)	0	0	10 (33)	0	8 (33)	74 (229)
9	(Egypt) Tarek Yehia	1981–1992	51	6	0	4	10	0	0	71
10	(Egypt) Shikabala	2002–2005; 2006–2014; 2016–2017; 2019–2025	50 (276)	10 (48)	0	0	10 (69)	0	0	70 (394)

- Most goals scored in all competitions: 134 – Abdel Halim Ali
- Most goals scored in the League: 80 – Abdel Halim Ali
- Most goals scored in October League Cup: 9 – Hassan Shehata
- Most goals scored in Egypt Cup: 23 – Alaa El-Hamouly
- Most goals scored in all African competitions: 23 – Abdel Halim Ali
- Most goals scored in all Arabian competitions: 13 – Abdel Halim Ali

=== Awards winners ===
EFA Egyptian Player of the Year

- (Egypt) Hassan Shehata – 1976
- (Egypt) Ibrahim Youssef – 1984
- (Egypt) Tarek El-Said – 2001
- (Egypt) Hazem Emam – 2003
- (Egypt) Shikabala – 2011

=== Matches ===
- First League match: Farouk (Zamalek) 5–1 El-Masry, Week 1, 22 October 1948.
- First Egypt Cup match: Mokhtalat (Zamalek) 4–0 Tersana SC, first round, 3 March 1922.
- First African Cup Winners' Cup match: Zamalek 3–0 Al Ahly (Tripoli), first round, 7 May 1976.
- First CAF Champions League match: Zamalek 2–1 Simba F.C., first round, 16 March 1979.
- First CAF Cup match: Zamalek 0–1 Gor Mahia, first round, 21 March 1998.
- First CAF Confederation Cup match: Zamalek 3–1 Rayon Sports, first round, 15 March 2015.
- Longest Winning Streak: 10 matches (1987–1988), (2012–2013).
- Longest Clean sheet: 7 matches (2014–15 Egyptian Premier League).
- Longest Unbeaten Streak in Egypt Cup (Egyptian Record): 22 matches (2013–2017).
- Longest Unbeaten Home Streak in African Cups (African Record): 70 matches (1976–2005).

=== Individual ===
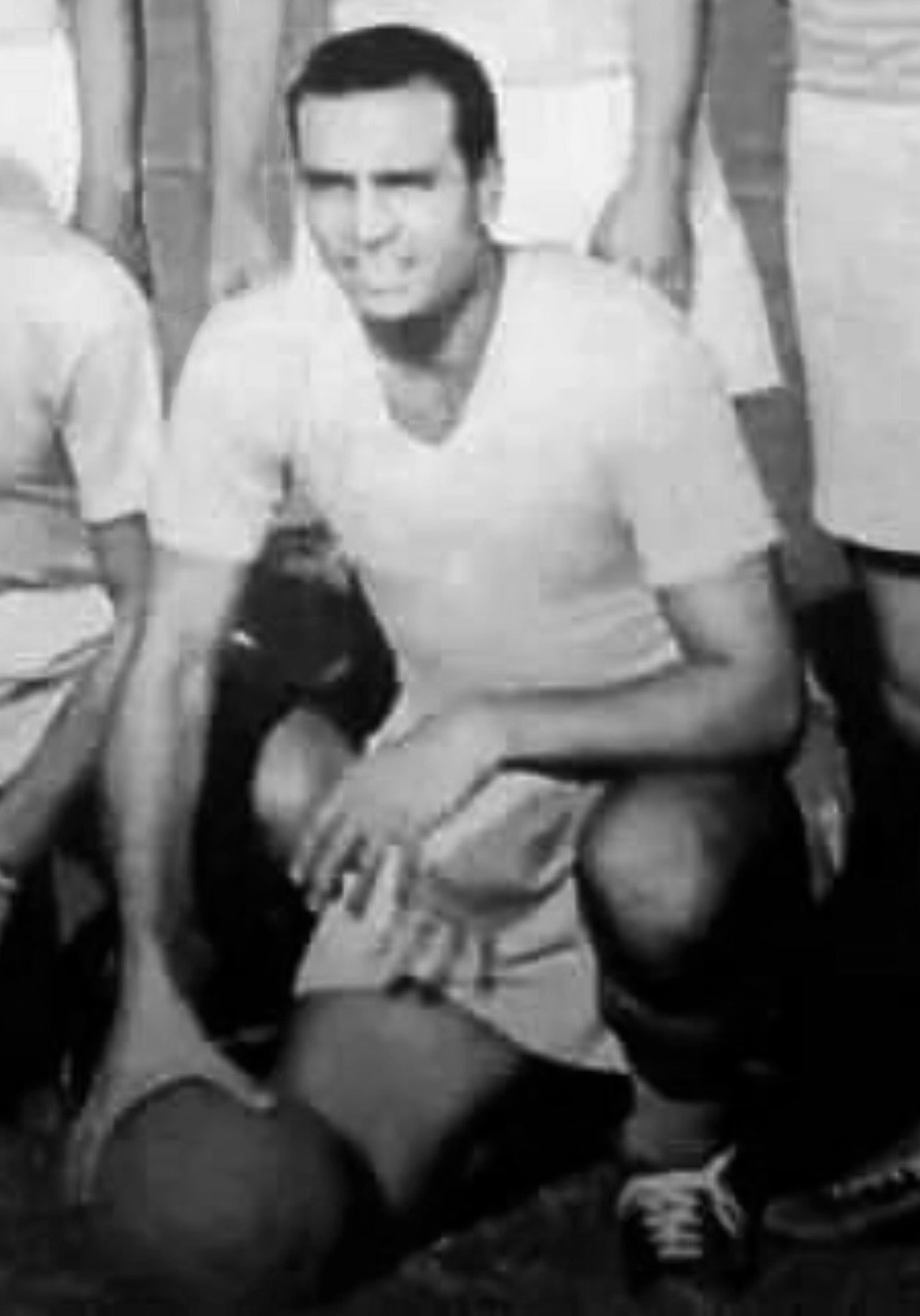
Alaa El-Hamouly, Zamalek's all-time top scorer of the Egypt Cup

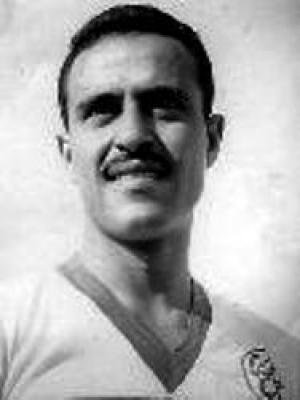
Ali Mohsen, League's top-scorer in 1960–61 season

==== League ====
- Ayman Younes scored the fastest goal in 1990 against Suez after 13 seconds.
- Mohamed Amin scored the first goal in the Egyptian League against El Masry.
- Saad Rostom scored the first hat-trick for Zamalek in the league against El Masry.

The following players have won the top scorer award in the league while playing with Zamalek:

Season	Player	Goals
1960–61	(Yemen) Ali Mohsen	16
1976–77	(Egypt) Ali Khalil	17
1976–77	(Egypt) Hassan Shehata	17
1978–79	(Egypt) Ali Khalil	12
1979–80	(Egypt) Hassan Shehata	14
1987–88	(Egypt) Gamal Abdel-Hamid	11
1997–98	(Egypt) Abdul Hamid Bassiouny	15
2000–01	(Egypt) Tarek El-Said	13
2001–02	(Egypt) Hossam Hassan	18
2003–04	(Egypt) Abdel Halim Ali	21
2010–11	(Egypt) Shikabala	13
2021–22	(Egypt) Ahmed Sayed	19

==== Cup ====
- Hussein Yasser scored the fastest goal in the cup against Al Ahly in 2010 after 46 seconds.
- Alaa El-Hamouly is Zamalek's all-time top scorer in the cup.

== Rivalries ==
=== Cairo Derby ===
The Cairo Derby is a rivalry match between Egyptian clubs Zamalek and Al Ahly SC. Both clubs are located in Greater Cairo, and their matches are considered the highlight of the football season with a live broadcast to most of the Middle Eastern and North African countries since the 1970s. Typically, the derby is played twice each season with two matches in the Egyptian Premier League, in addition to possible match-ups in the Egypt Cup, Egypt Super Cup, and the CAF Champions League.

=== Mit Okba Derby ===
The Mit Okba derby is a football match between Zamalek and Tersana SC. Both teams are located in the Mit Okba region in Giza. The derby was one of the most important matches of the Egyptian Premier League during the 1960s and 1970s, but it gradually lost its value after Tersana SC's performance started to deteriorate and the club has been relegated more than once to the Egyptian Second Division where it currently plays after being relegated for the sixth time in the 2008–09 season.

== Finances and ownership ==
In 2018, Presentation Sports obtained a contract that increased from 100 million Egyptian pounds to 120 million annually to sponsor the club increased This increase in the sponsorship contract will be other than 20% over the amount mentioned in each year including broadcasting rights.

The financial cost of the new team uniform reached 9 million Egyptian pounds.

The board of directors of the National Bank of Egypt signed a contract with Zamalek's management to rent three stores in the club wall on the League of Arab States Street with a usufruct for 25 years, with a rent for two years in advance. Zamalek Club signed a cooperation protocol with Banque Misr, from which it obtains immediate returns of 10 million pounds under the protocol. In return, Banque Misr has the right to use two local walls of the Zamalek Club wall for 20 years in exchange for 5 million pounds and an annual rent of 1.560 million pounds.

The report of the Controller at the Zamalek Club revealed that the budget surplus for the fiscal year 2018–2019 reached 170 million Egyptian pounds.

The temporary committee that runs the Zamalek club has signed a cooperation protocol with the Ministry of Military Production (Egypt) for a construction and sports boom. Imad Abdel Aziz, head of the temporary committee at Zamalek Club, stated that this protocol will contribute to building 6 October branch.

Zamalek Club and Aerosport Sports Club of the Ministry of Civil Aviation signed a protocol of joint cooperation aimed at benefiting from the expertise of Zamalek.

Zamalek SC has signed a cooperation protocol with the "I-Friends Sports" company, to establish a branch of the club in the United Arab Emirates.

== Popular culture ==
=== Documentaries ===
In 2015, a documentary entitled Zamalek, O Engineering, playing, Art and Engineering, was produced by Abu Dhabi Sports. It was presented in two parts, and presents the history of the club since its foundation.

Another documentary film produced in 2016, Al Hekaya Mpethanish(The story does not end), covers the club's history in the five championships in the African Champions League, and was produced by DMC Sport channel.

Another documentary film was produced by the CBC network in 2017, entitled Helmy Zamora. It covers the story of Helmy or Zamora the icon of Zamalek club.

Another documentary film was produced in 2019 with the title Zamalek Club, the National and Dignity Club. It was produced by the club, and shows the history of the club since its establishment.

Another documentary film produced in 2020 entitled Zamalek Legends: A long history of stars who inhabited the memory, produced by Abu Dhabi Sports channel, covers the highlight of the club's most prominent stars from different generations.

Another documentary film produced in 2020 entitled Zamalek – The Road to the African Super 2020, produced by beIN SPORTS Arabia channel, documents Zamalek's journey in winning the 2019 CAF Confederation Cup.

Another documentary film produced in 2020 entitled Zamalek, the Road to the Semi-finals 2020, produced by beIN SPORTS Arabia channel, describes Zamalek won the African Super Cup championship against Espérance Sportive de Tunis, and won the local super championship against Al Ahly.

=== Anthem ===
Malaki (Royal) is the Zamalek Club's anthem in the year of the Zamalek Club's centenary in 2011, with words, composition and singing by the artist Aziz Al-Shafi’i. The words are as follows:

Royal, Royal, Zamalek, Royal

Zamalek, My precious, Your flag is always high

Royal, Royal, Zamalek, Royal

Zamalek, My precious, Your flag is always high

We'll be by your side even before you call us

You're not just a club to us

We're always by your side and with you

No matter what happens, we'll stay behind you

We'll cheer for our club with the loudest voice

Zamalek fans and pride is ours

Royal, Royal, Zamalek, Royal

Zamalek, My precious, Your flag is always high

Egyptian since the day you were born, you're a symbol for your country

Who can deny your history, who can forget your glories

We're always by your side and with you

No matter what happens, we'll stay behind you

We'll cheer for our club with the loudest voice

Zamalek fans and pride is ours.

=== Media ===
==== Zamalek TV ====
Zamalek Club owns a TV channel known as Zamalek TV, which broadcasts on Nilesat in SD quality. The broadcast began experimentally on 31 December 2019 before the channel launched on 22 January 2020. The channel focuses on news about the club.

==== Zamalek Magazine ====
Zamalek magazine is an official Zamalek weekly magazine that is issued every Thursday, and contains news and reviews about the club and interviews with the players

=== Other ===
In South Africa, Zamalek also is a nickname for the strong alcoholic drink Carling Black Label due to them beating local club Kaiser Chiefs by an outstanding score in the 1990s.

== Club of the Century ==
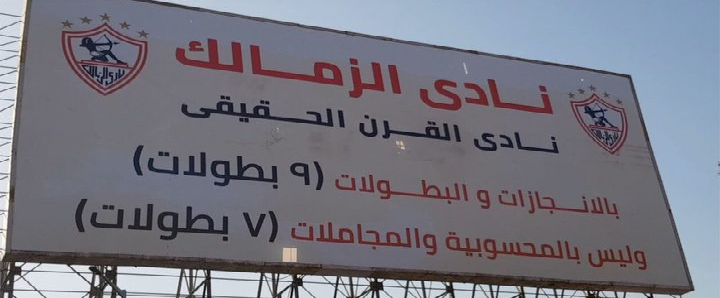

In February 2014 administration of Zamalek announced the nickname of the club as the Club of the Century, as the most successful club of the 20th century in Africa (gaining 9 titles versus 7 for its closest rival)

=== CAF African Clubs top titles winners at the end of 20th century ===
Pos	Club	Titles	Trophies won
1	(Egypt) Zamalek	7 (+2)	4 African Cup of Champions Clubs, 1 African Cup Winners Cup, (2 CAF Super Cup, 2 Afro-Asian Club Championship)
2	(Egypt) Al-Ahly	6 (+1)	2 African Cup of Champions Clubs, 4 CAF Cup Winners' Cups, (1 Afro-Asian Club Championship)
3	(Tunisia) ES Tunis	4 (+1)	1 African Cup of Champions Clubs; 1 CAF Cup Winners' Cup, 1 CAF Cup, (1 CAF Super Cup, 1 Afro-Asian Club Championship)
3	(Algeria) JS Kabylie	4 (+1)	2 African Cup of Champions Clubs, 1 CAF Cup Winners' Cup, 1 CAF Cup, (1 African Super Cup)
3	(Morocco) Raja Casablanca	4 (+1)	3 African Cup of Champions Clubs, (1 CAF Super Cup, 1 Afro-Asian Club Championship)
3	(Cameroon) Canon Yaoundé	4	3 African Cup of Champions Clubs, 1 CAF Cup Winners' Cup

== Honours ==
Zamalek is one of the top twenty clubs with the most titles in the world, and the seventh with the most continental and intercontinental titles, with 15 international honors.

Zamalek SC honours
Type	Competition	Titles	Seasons
Domestic	Egyptian Premier League	15	1959–60, 1963–64, 1964–65, 1977–78, 1983–84, 1987–88, 1991–92, 1992–93, 2000–01, 2002–03, 2003–04, 2014–15, 2020–21, 2021–22, 2025–26
Domestic	Egypt Cup	29	1921–22, 1931–32, 1934–35, 1937–38, 1940–41, 1942–43, 1943–44, 1951–52, 1954–55, 1956–57, 1957–58, 1958–59, 1959–60, 1961–62, 1974–75, 1976–77, 1978–79, 1987–88, 1998–99, 2001–02, 2007–08, 2012–13, 2013–14, 2014–15, 2015–16, 2017–18, 2018–19, 2020–21, 2024–25
Domestic	Egyptian Super Cup	4	2001–02, 2002–03, 2016–17, 2019–20
Domestic	Cairo League	14	1922–23, 1928–29, 1929–30, 1931–32, 1933–34, 1939–40, 1940–41, 1943–44, 1944–45, 1946–47, 1948–49, 1950–51, 1951–52, 1952–53
Domestic	Sultan Hussein Cup	2	1920–21, 1921–22
Domestic	October League	1	1974
Domestic	Egyptian Friendship Cup	1	1986
Domestic	Egyptian Confederation Cup	1^{S}	1995
Continental	CAF Champions League	5	1984, 1986, 1993, 1996, 2002
Continental	African Cup Winners' Cup	1	2000
Continental	CAF Confederation Cup	2	2018–19, 2023–24
Continental	CAF Super Cup	5	1994, 1997, 2003, 2020, 2024
Intercontinental	Afro-Asian Club Championship	2	1987, 1997
Subregional	Arab Club Champions Cup	1	2003
Total		83	

- record
- ^{S} shared record

== Players ==
=== Current squad ===
As of 19 September 2026

Note: Flags indicate national team as defined under FIFA eligibility rules; some limited exceptions apply. Players may hold more than one non-FIFA nationality.

No.	Pos.	Nation	Player
2	DF	EGY	Ahmad Hossam
3	DF	MAR	Mahmoud Bentayg
4	DF	EGY	Omar Gaber (captain)
6	MF	EGY	Mahmoud Gehad
7	FW	EGY	Hossam Ashraf
9	FW	EGY	Nasser Mansi
11	FW	EGY	Ahmed Abdel Rahim
12	MF	EGY	Ahmed Rabie
13	DF	EGY	Ahmed Abou El Fotouh
14	MF	EGY	Seif Gaafar
16	GK	EGY	Mohamed Sobhy
17	MF	EGY	Mohamed Shehata
18	MF	PLE	Adam Kaied
20	DF	EGY	Mostafa El Zenary
19	MF	EGY	Abdallah El Said
21	FW	TUN	Ahmed Jafeli
24	DF	EGY	Mohamed Ismail
28	DF	EGY	Mahmoud Hamdy (vice-captain)

No.	Pos.	Nation	Player
31	FW	EGY	Ahmed Sherif
37	GK	EGY	El Mahdy Soliman
38	GK	EGY	Omar AbdulAziz
39	MF	EGY	Mohamed El Sayed
43	DF	EGY	Alsayed Osama
44	MF	EGY	Youssef Wael
46	GK	EGY	Mahmoud Ashraf
52	DF	EGY	Mohamed Ebrahim
55	MF	EGY	Muhammad Hamad
56	MF	EGY	Ahmad Safwat
57	FW	EGY	Adham Hasseib
58	DF	EGY	Mohamed Faraj
81	FW	ANG	Chico Banza
90	FW	EGY	Amr Nasser
97	DF	EGY	Ahmed Alkhoudary
98	FW	PLE	Oday Dabbagh
99	GK	EGY	Mohamed Awad

=== Out on loan ===
Note: Flags indicate national team as defined under FIFA eligibility rules; some limited exceptions apply. Players may hold more than one non-FIFA nationality.

No. / Pos. / Nation / Player	No. / Pos. / Nation / Player

=== Youth team and reserves ===
Note: Flags indicate national team as defined under FIFA eligibility rules; some limited exceptions apply. Players may hold more than one non-FIFA nationality.

No.	Pos.	Nation	Player
—	GK	EGY	Mohamed Abdul Fattah
—	DF	EGY	Ali Nofal
—	MF	EGY	Hesham Mohamed Fouad

No.	Pos.	Nation	Player
41	FW	EGY	Amaar Yasser
50	FW	EGY	Ayman Amir

=== Players under contract ===
Note: Flags indicate national team as defined under FIFA eligibility rules; some limited exceptions apply. Players may hold more than one non-FIFA nationality.

No.	Pos.	Nation	Player

=== Notable players ===
This list includes players that have appeared in at least 100 league games or have reached international status.

- (Egypt) Tewfik Abdullah
- (Egypt) Ali El-Hassani
- (Egypt) Ibrahim Yakan
- (Egypt) Ahmed Salem
- (Egypt) Fouad Gamil
- (Egypt) Gamil Osman
- (Egypt) Ali Riadh
- (Egypt) Sayed Abaza
- (Egypt) Mohammed Bakhati
- (Egypt) Hussein Hegazi
- (Egypt) Mostafa Taha
- (Egypt) Ismail Rafaat
- (Egypt) Ahmed Halim Ibrahim
- (Egypt) Mohamed Latif
- (Egypt) Ali El-Kaf
- (Egypt) Galal Keraitam
- (Egypt) Yehia Emam
- (Egypt) Omar Shendi
- (Egypt) Hassan El-Far
- (Egypt) Helmy Zamora
- (Egypt) Hanafy Bastan
- (Egypt) Abdulrahman Fawzi
- (Egypt) Abdel-Karim Sakr
- (Egypt) Zoklot
- (Egypt) Sharif El-Far
- (Egypt) Nour El-Dali

- (Egypt) Essam Baheeg
- (Egypt) Alaa El-Hamouly
- (Egypt) Raafat Attia
- (Egypt) Abdou Noshi
- (Egypt) Hamada Emam
- (Egypt) Samir Qotb
- (Egypt) Nabil Nosair
- (Egypt) Taha Basry
- (Egypt) Hassan Shehata
- (Egypt) Farouk Gaafar
- (Egypt) Ali Khalil
- (Egypt) Adel El-Maamour
- (Egypt) Mohamed Helmy
- (Egypt) Gamal Abdel-Hamid
- (Egypt) Ashraf Kasem
- (Egypt) Ahmed Ramzy
- (Egypt) Hesham Yakan
- (Egypt) Tarek Yehia
- (Egypt) Ayman Younes
- (Egypt) Ibrahim Youssef
- (Egypt) Effat Nssar
- (Egypt) Ismail Youssef
- (Egypt) Khaled El Ghandour
- (Egypt) Abdul-Hamid Bassiouny
- (Egypt) Tarek Mostafa
- (Egypt) Osama Nabih
- (Egypt) Mohamed Sabry
- (Egypt) Ahmed El-Kass
- (Egypt) Mehdat Abdelhadi
- (Egypt) Ayman Abdelaziz
- (Egypt) Abdel-Wahed El-Sayed
- (Egypt) Hossam Hassan
- (Egypt) Ibrahim Hassan
- (Egypt) Mohamed Aboul Ela
- (Egypt) Shikabala
- (Egypt) Hazem Emam
- (Egypt) Abdel Halim Ali
- (Egypt) Tamer Abdel Hamid
- (Egypt) Mohamed Abdel Shafy
- (Egypt) Tarek El-Sayed
- (Egypt) Ahmed Hossam Mido
- (Egypt) Ahmed Hassan
- (Egypt) Amr Zaki
- (Egypt) Tarek Hamed
- (Italy) Aldo Stella
- (Yemen) Ali Mohsen
- (Ghana) Emmanuel Quarshie
- (Nigeria) Emmanuel Amuneke
- (Algeria) Kamel Kaci-Saïd
- (Egypt) Emam Ashour
- (Tunisia) Ferjani Sassi

== Personnel ==
=== Current technical staff ===
Position	Name
Head coach	(Egypt) Motamed Gamal
Assistant coach	(Portugal) Fabio Nuno
Assistant coach	(Egypt) Ibrahim Salah
Goalkeeping coach	(Portugal) Vitor Periera
Fitness coach	(Portugal) Nuno Ribeiro

=== Football sport management ===
Position	Name
Sporting Director	(Egypt) John Edward Nassif
Director of Football	(Egypt) Abdel-Nasser Mohamed
Director of Contracts	(Egypt) Abdel-Rahman Ismail
Managerial Delegates	(Egypt) Montaser El-Sayed
Managerial Delegates	(Egypt) Abdallah Hussein
Managerial Delegates	(Egypt) Mohamed Abdel-Rahim

=== Medical staff ===
Position	Name
Head of medical staff	(Spain) Gerard Owusu Manzanite
Head of physiotherapy team	(Egypt) Mohamed Shawky
Physiotherapy and recovery specialist	(Egypt) Amr Owaida
Rehabilitation specialist	(Egypt) Mostafa Abdou (Egypt) Alaa Ragab
Masseur	(Egypt) Saeed Suwaylam (Egypt) Mohamed El Gazzar

=== Management ===
==== Board of Directors ====
Office	Name
President	(Egypt) Hussein Labib
Vice President	(Egypt) Hisham Nasr
Secretary of the fund	(Egypt) Hossam El-Mandouh
board member	(Egypt) Ahmed Souliman
board member	(Egypt) Hussein El-Sayed
board member	(Egypt) Amr El-Adham
board member	(Egypt) Hani Berzi
board member	(Egypt) Hani Shukri
board member	(Egypt) Muhammad Tariq
board member	(Egypt) Nayera El-Ahmar
board member	(Egypt) Rami Nasuhi
board member	(Egypt) Ahmed Khaled

== Other sports ==
Zamalek participates in many sports besides football, such as Handball, Athletics, Volleyball, and Basketball. Zamalek has won many domestic, Arab and African tournaments and participated in world championships.
