= Galal Keraitam =

Egyptian footballer (1913-1961)

Personal information
- Date of birth: January 1913
- Place of birth: Hosh Essa, Beheira, Egypt
- Date of death: 30 October 1961 (aged 48)
- Position: Defender

Senior career*
Years	Team	Apps	(Gls)
- Zamalek

International career
- Egypt
- * Club domestic league appearances and goals

Galal Keraitam (Arabic: جلال قريطم; January 1913 – 30 October 1961), was an Egyptian footballer who played as a defender for Zamalek. He also played for the Egyptian national team.

== Honours ==
Zamalek SC

- Egypt Cup:
  1943–44
- Cairo League:
  1943–44
