= Amaar Yasser =

Egyptian footballer (born 2004)

Personal information
- Date of birth: January 1, 2004 (age 22)
- Position: Forward

Team information
- Current team: Zamalek

Youth career
- Zamalek U19/U21

Senior career*
Years	Team	Apps	(Gls)
2024–	Zamalek		
- * Club domestic league appearances and goals

Amaar Yasser (Arabic: عمار ياسر; born 1 January 2004) is an Egyptian professional footballer who plays as a Forward for Egyptian Premier League club Zamalek .
