= Omar AbdulAziz =

Egyptian footballer (born 2008)

Omar Abdul Aziz (Arabic: عمر عبد العزيز; born 1 January 2008) is an Egyptian professional footballer who plays as a goalkeeper for Egyptian Premier League club Zamalek.
