= Hanafy Bastan =

Egyptian footballer and manager (1922–1995)

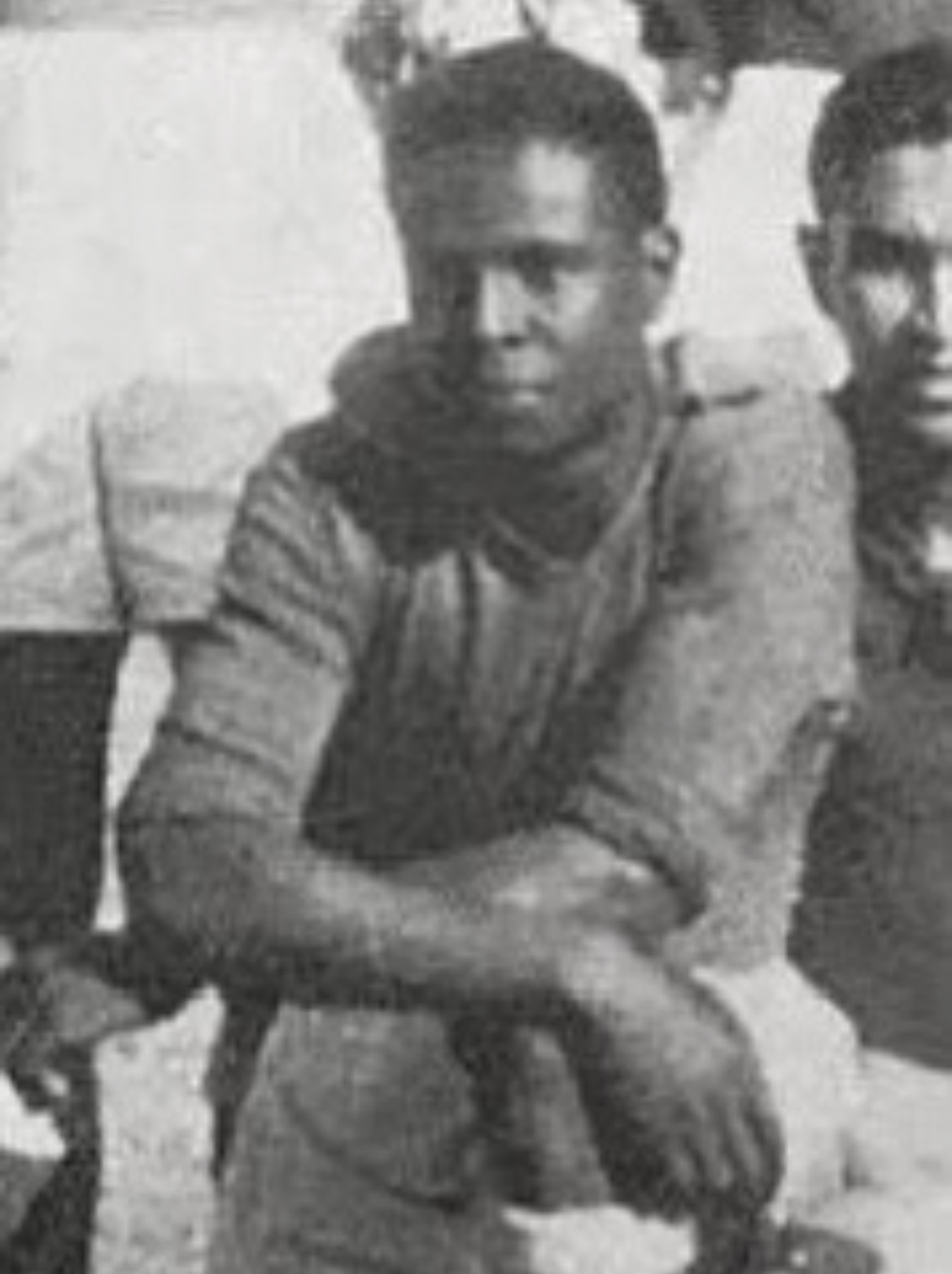
- Bastan with Egypt in 1947

Personal information
- Full name: Hanafy Bastan
- Date of birth: 6 January 1922
- Place of birth: Cairo, Egypt
- Date of death: 13 November 1995 (aged 73)
- Place of death: Cairo, Egypt
- Position: Defender

Youth career
- 1937–1938: Zamalek

Senior career*
Years	Team	Apps	(Gls)
1938–1958	Zamalek		

International career
1944–1957	Egypt	56	(16)

Managerial career
- 1958: Egypt
- 1962: Egypt
Medal record
Men's football
Representing Egypt (as player)
Africa Cup of Nations
Winner	1957 Egypt
Arab Games
Gold medal – first place	1953 Alexandria
Mediterranean Games
Gold medal – first place	1955 Barcelona
Representing United Arab Republic (as manager)
Africa Cup of Nations
Silver medal – second place	1962 Ethiopia
- * Club domestic league appearances and goals

Hanafy Bastan (Arabic: حنفي بسطان; 6 January 1922 – 13 November 1995) was an Egyptian footballer who played as a defender for Zamalek and the Egypt national team. He represented his country in the 1948 and 1952 Summer Olympics. Bastan played for Egypt in the 1953 Arab Games, where Egypt won the gold medal. He was also a part of the team that won the gold medal in the 1955 Mediterranean Games. He was the captain of the team that won the 1957 African Cup of Nations, he is the first Egyptian player to lift the African trophy.

He started his football career in 1938, became a regular player in Zamalek's starting lineup in 1942, he won with the team 17 titles. Bastan was Zamalek and Egypt's captain for several years, he was nicknamed the "Black Rock". After retiring from football, he coached Egypt with Mohamed El-Guindi in the 1962 African Cup of Nations, and Egypt won the silver medal.

== Early life ==
Hanafy Bastan was born on 6 January 1922 in Sayyidah Zainab District, Cairo. He learned football skills by playing in Housh Ayoub Bey in Sayyeda Zeinab neighborhood. He was the captain of the primary school, then the middle school, and finally the Saidia Secondary School. Mahmoud Badr El-Din, who was working as a coach at the time, saw him in one of their matches, and he joined the Zamalek youth team in 1937.

== Playing career ==
=== Club career ===
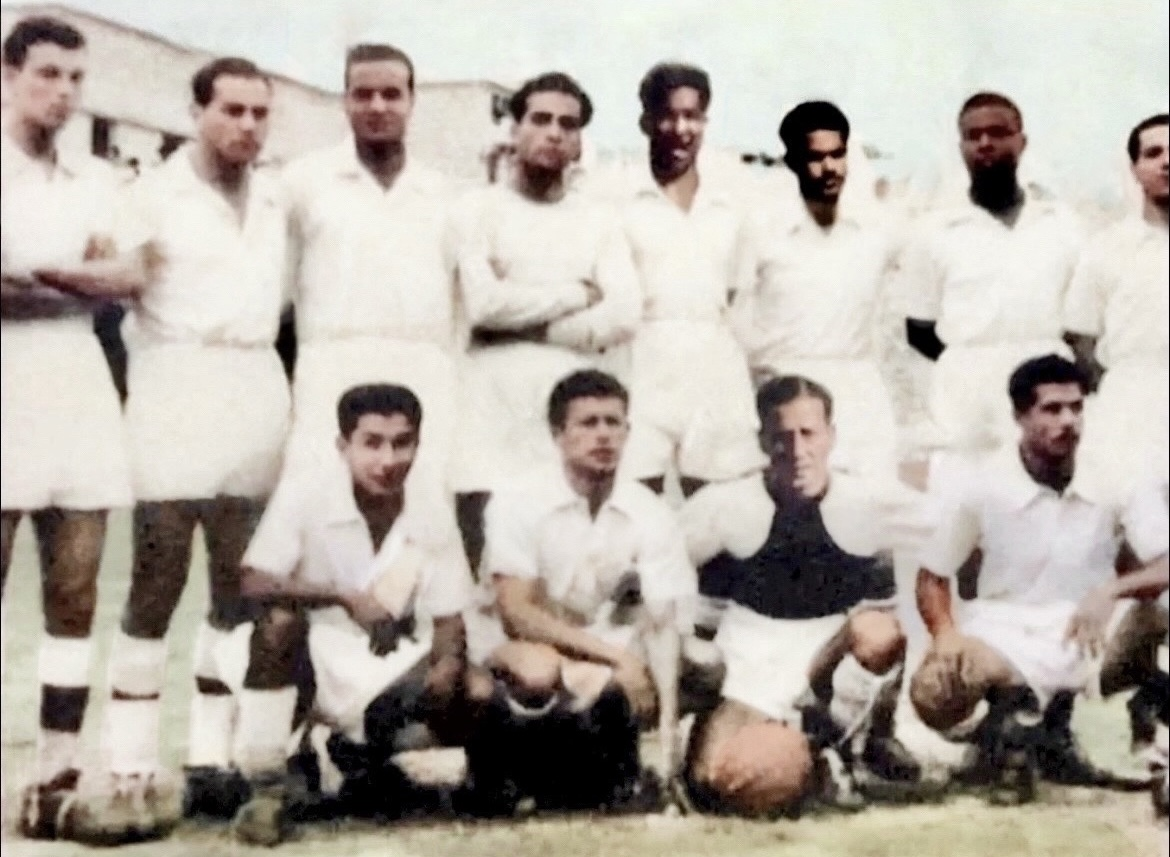
Bastan (second standing from right) with Zamalek in 1952

Bastan's first official match with Zamalek was against Al Ahly in the 1941–42 Cairo League, and Zamalek won 6-0, with Bastan shining as a center back in the Cairo derby, he quickly became a key player in the team. He won seven titles of the Egypt Cup with Zamalek (1941, 1943, 1944, 1952, 1955, 1957, 1958). He won with Zamalek ten titles of the Cairo League titles (1939–40, 1940–41, 1943–44, 1944–45, 1945–46, 1946–47, 1948–49, 1950–51, 1951–52, 1952–53).

Nicknamed the Black Rock, Bastan played with several generations of Zamalek, he played with Mohamed Latif in latter's final days as a player, he also played with Abdel-Karim Sakr, Omar Shendi, Abdulrahman Fawzi, Helmy Zamora, finally he was the captain of the team including Essam Baheeg, Alaa El-Hamouly, Nour El-Dali, Sharif El-Far and Abdou Noshi. He was a key player in the team, he played with Zamalek for almost 20 years, with 16 seasons in the starting lineup achieving 18 titles for his club.

=== International career ===
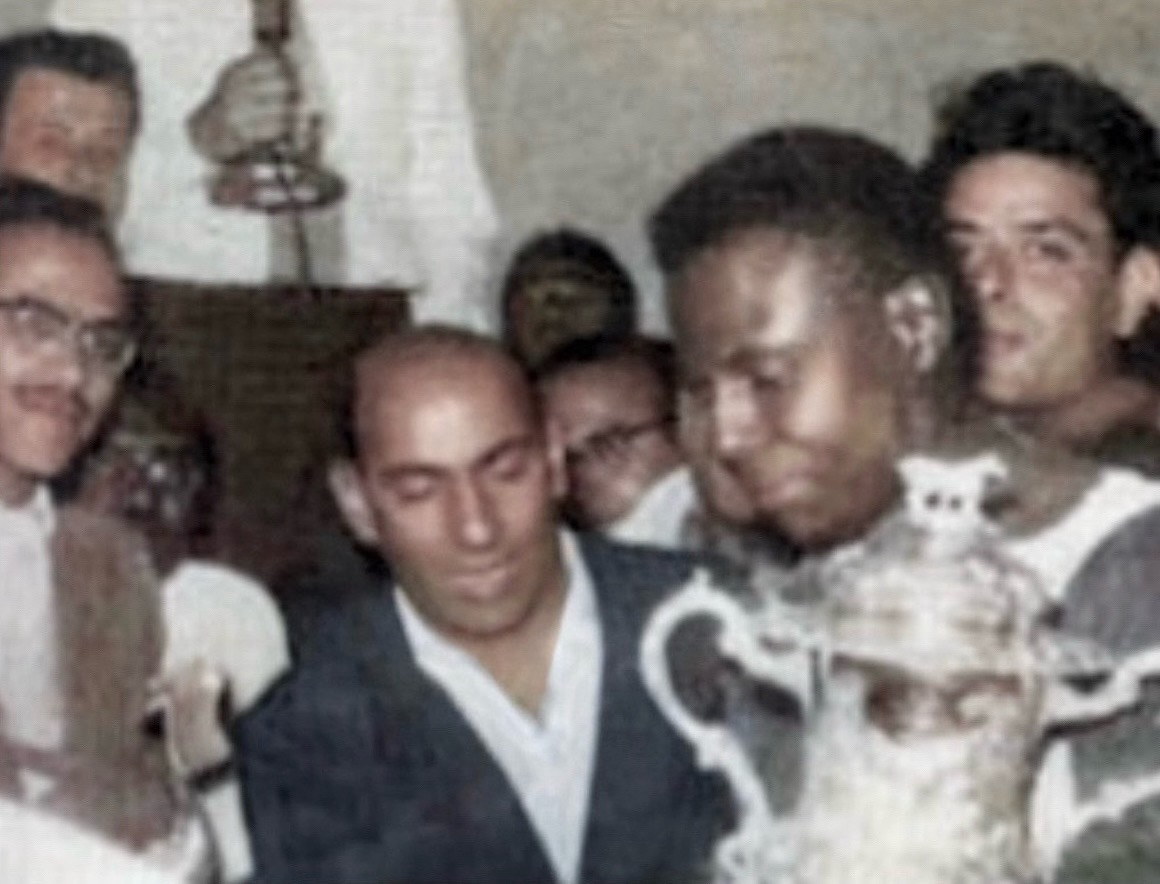
Egypt's captain Bastan carrying the African Cup of Nations trophy in 1957

He played his first international game with the Egypt national football team in 1945 and participated in the London tournament in the same year. Bastan played 56 international matches and scored 16 goals for his country. He was a part of the team that participated in the 1948 Olympic Games in London. He also was a part of the team that participated in the 1952 Olympic Games in Helsinki. He played for his country in the 1951 Mediterranean Games in Alexandria, where the hosts finished with a silver medal. He won the gold medal with Egypt in the first Arab Games in 1953.

In 1955, he played with his country in the 1955 Mediterranean Games in Barcelona, in which Egypt won the gold medal. Bastan was Egypt's captain in the first Africa Cup of Nations in Sudan, he is the first Egyptian player to lift the African trophy after his country won the 1957 African Cup of Nations. He retired from football in 1958.

== Post retirement career ==
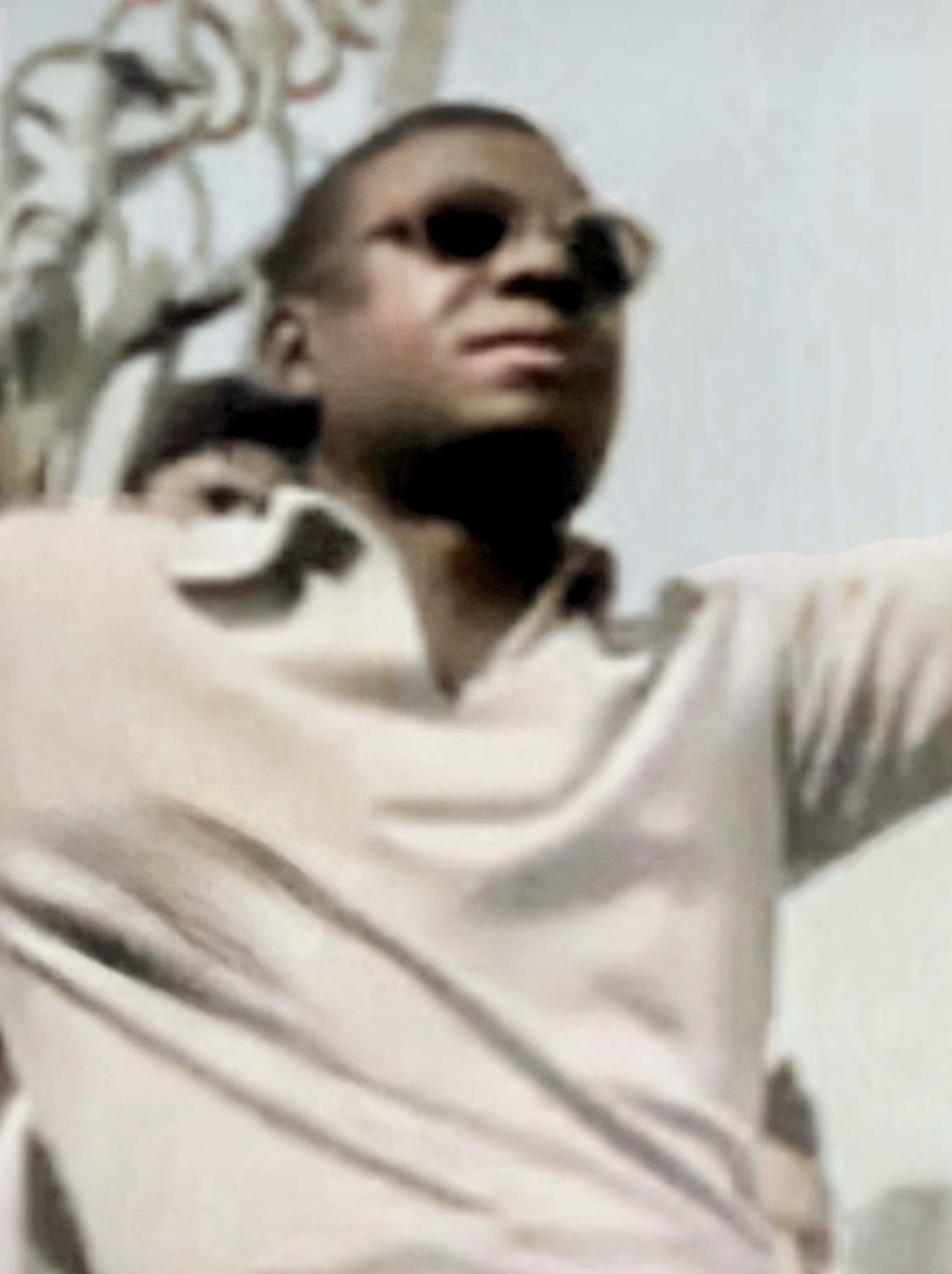
Bastan in 1965

After his retirement, he worked as coach in Zamalek, he also coached Egypt with his long time friend Mohamed El-Guindi in the 1962 African Cup of Nations, and Egypt finished second. Afterwards, he left coaching career. In the 1960s, Bastan became a senior football adviser in Zamalek, a post which he held until his death in 1995. In Egyptian Cinema, Bastan appeared in two films, he co-starred in Talk of the City (Hadeeth Al-Madina Arabic: حديث المدينة) (1964) and Goodbye Forever (Wada'n Ela Al-Abad Arabic: وداعاً إلى الأبد) (1976).

== Death ==
On the evening on November 11, 1995, while Bastan was browsing the evening newspapers, he came across the news of the death of his lifelong friend and companion, Mohamed El-Guindi who died at the same morning. He was shocked by the news and a few hours later, he was rushed to El Safa Hospital in Mohandessin with extremely high blood pressure, where he fell into a deep coma. Doctors desperately tried to save him, but he died on the morning of November 13, 1995.

== Honours ==
=== Player ===
Zamalek

- Egypt Cup: 1940–41, 1942–43, 1943–44, 1951–52, 1954–55, 1956–57, 1957–58
- Cairo League:1939–40, 1940–41, 1943–44, 1944–45, 1946–47, 1948–49, 1950–51, 1951–52, 1952–53
- King Fouad Cup: 1940–41

Egypt

- African Cup of Nations: 1957
- Arab Games: (1)
  1953
- Mediterranean Games: (1)
  1955

=== Manager ===
United Arab Republic

- African Cup of Nations: runner-up, 1962

== Filmography ==
- 1964: Talk of the City
- 1976: Goodbye Forever
