= List of Zamalek SC Honours =

Zamalek Football Club Championships list displays all Zamalek SC trophies and achievements in football since its inception on 5 January 1911, under the name of Qasr El Nil Club by the Belgian George Merzbach. Afterwards, the Egyptianization process took place and the club was managed by Egyptians starting from 1915. Zamalek is a professional Egyptian sports club that plays in the Egyptian Premier League, and it is one of seven clubs that have not been relegated to the second division.

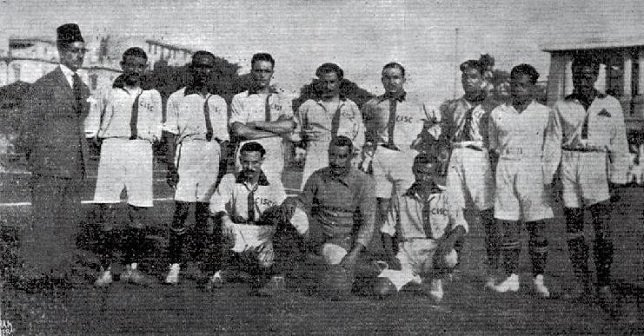
Zamalek football team that won the Sultan Hussein Cup in 1921, becoming the first Egyptian club to win a trophy.

Zamalek is the first Egyptian club to win a title, as it was the first Egyptian team to win the Sultan Hussein Cup in 1921, the first team to win the Egypt Cup in 1922, and the first team to win the Cairo League in 1922–23. The club is the second most successful club in the history of Egyptian football in terms of the number of local championships, as the club has won fifteen Egyptian League titles, twenty-nine titles in the Egypt Cup, four titles in the Egyptian Super Cup, fourteen titles in the Cairo League and two titles in the Sultan Hussein Cup, one title of the October League Cup, three titles of King Fouad Cup, one title of Egyptian Friendship Cup and one title of the Egyptian Confederation Cup.

Zamalek is considered an African giant, one of the most successful clubs in the history of African football at the level of African championships, as it has achieved 15 African continental titles by winning the CAF Champions League five times, two titles in the CAF Confederation Cup, and once in the African Cup Winners' Cup, five times in the CAF Super Cup, in addition to winning two titles of the Afro-Asian Club Championship. At the Arab level, Zamalek won the Arab Club Champions Cup once and the Egyptian-Saudi Super Cup twice. The Zamalek football team is the most victorious African team in the continental level in the 20th century, with 9 tournaments. The football team in Zamalek also won the title of the best club in the world according to the International Federation of Football History & Statistics (IFFHS) in February 2003.

== Summary ==
The list includes all the achievements of the Zamalek SC throughout its history and with the various names of the club from the mixed club (1913–1941) to Farouk I Club (1941–1952), where it was known before the 1952 revolution, and even its current name, which was changed to it after the revolution. Surnames under the name: Mixed club (1913–1941), Farouk Club (1941–1952), Zamalek SC (1952–present).

=== Domestic trophies (67) ===
| Type | Competition | Titles | Seasons |
|---|---|---|---|
| Domestic | Egyptian Premier League | 15 | * Winners (15) : 1959–60, 1963–64, 1964–65, 1977–78, 1983–84, 1987–88, 1991–92, 1992–93, 2000–01, 2002–03, 2003–04, 2014–15, 2020–21, 2021–22, 2025–26 |
| Domestic | Egypt Cup | 29 | (27 solo titles and 2 titles in conjunction with Al Ahly SC in 1943 and 1958.): Winners (28) : 1921–22, 1931–32, 1934–35, 1937–38, 1940–41, 1942–43, 1943–44, 1951–52, 1954–55, 1956–57, 1957–58, 1958–59, 1959–60, 1961–62, 1974–75, 1976–77, 1978–79, 1987–88, 1998–99, 2001–02, 2007–08, 2012–13, 2013–14, 2014–15, 2015–16, 2017–18, 2018–19, 2020–21, 2024–25; (* First ever winners) |
| Domestic | Egyptian Super Cup | 4 | * Winners (4) : 2001, 2002, 2016, 2020 (* First ever winners) |
| Domestic | Sultan Hussein Cup | 2 | * Winners (2) : 1920–21, 1921–22 (* First ever winners) |
| Domestic | Egyptian Confederation Cup | 1^{S} | * Winners (1): 1995 |
| Domestic | Cairo League | 14 | * Winners (14) : 1922–23, 1928–29, 1929–30, 1931–32, 1933–34, 1939–40, 1940–41, 1943–44, 1944–45, 1946–47, 1948–49, 1950–51, 1951–52, 1952–53 (* First ever winners) |
| Domestic | October League Cup | 1 | * Winners (1) : 1974 (* First ever winners) |
| Domestic | Egyptian Friendship Cup | 1 | * Winners (1) : 1986 (* First ever winners) |

=== Continental and intercontinental trophies (15) ===
| Type | Competition | Titles | Seasons |
|---|---|---|---|
| Continental | CAF Champions League | 5 | * Winners (5) : 1984, 1986, 1993, 1996, 2002 |
| Continental | CAF Confederation Cup | 2 | * Winners (2) : 2018–19, 2023–24 |
| Continental | CAF Super Cup | 5 | * Winners (5) : 1994, 1997, 2003, 2020, 2024 |
| Continental | African Cup Winners' Cup | 1 | * Winners (1) : 2000 |
| Intercontinental | Afro-Asian Cup | 2 | * Winners (2) : 1987, 1997 |

=== Arab Area (3) ===
| Type | Competition | Titles | Seasons |
|---|---|---|---|
| Arab | Arab Club Championship | 1 | * Winners (1) : 2003 |
| Arab | Saudi-Egyptian Super Cup | 2^{S} | Winners (2) : 2003‚ 2018 |

=== Other trophies (21) ===
| Type | Competition | Titles | Seasons |
|---|---|---|---|
| Unofficial titles | Defunct and Friendly titles | 21 | Bolanchi Challenge Cup; Winners (1): 1913; King Fouad Cup; Winners (3): 1925, 1934, 1941; Friendship International Cup; Winners (2): 1970, 1988; Independence Cup; Winners (2): 1987, 1988; Alexandria Summer League (Arabian competition); Winners (3): 1982, 1984, 2004; Egyptian Television Cup (Defunct Egyptian Super Cup); Winners (4): 1971, 1982, 1984, 1996; Giza League; Winners (1): 1963–64; Jordan International Cup; Winners (2): 1985–86, 1986–1987; Official Love Tournament; Winners (1): 1999; Egyptian-Algerian friendship Cup (organized by Zamalek); Winners (1): 2014; Dubai Challenge Cup; Winners (1): 2024 |

- record
- ^{S} shared record

=== Youth Competitions (2) ===
- Cairo League U20
  - Winners (1): 1963–64
- Cairo League U21
  - Winners (1): 1971–72

== See also ==
- List of Zamalek SC records and statistics
