= Mostafa Taha =

Egyptian footballer (1910–1969)

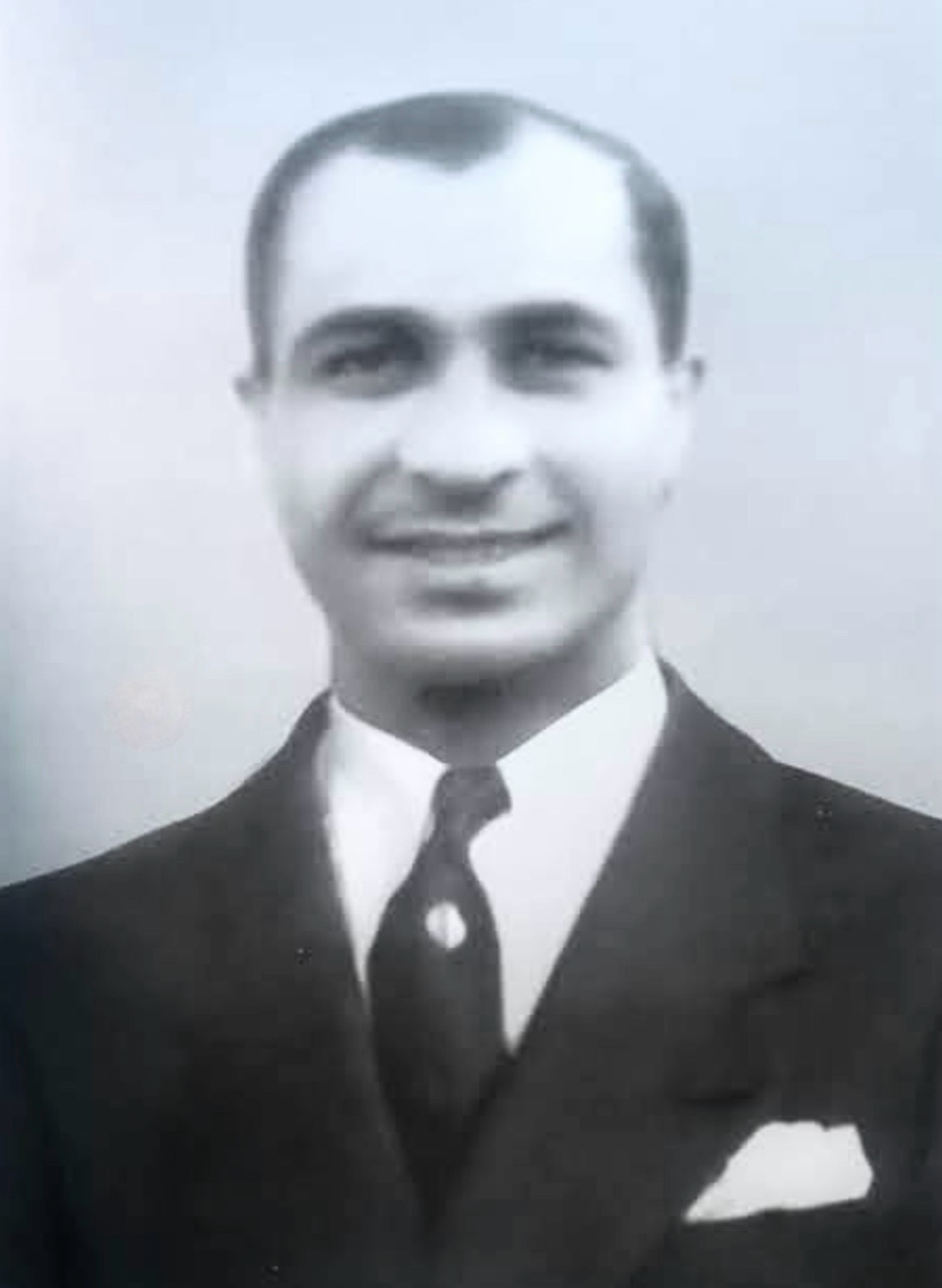
- Taha in 1942

Personal information
- Full name: Mostafa Kamel Taha Yossef El-Gamal
- Date of birth: 23 March 1910
- Place of birth: Egypt
- Date of death: 7 October 1969 (aged 59)
- Place of death: Cairo, Egypt
- Position: Forward

Senior career*
Years	Team	Apps	(Gls)
1928–1931	Zamalek		
1931–1933	Al Ahly		
1933–1945	Zamalek		

International career
- Egypt
- * Club domestic league appearances and goals

Mostafa Kamel Taha Yossef El-Gamal (Arabic: مُصْطَفَى كَامِل طٰهٰ يُوسُف الْجَمَل; 23 March 1910 – 7 October 1969) was an Egyptian football forward who played for Zamalek and Egypt. He was a prolific goal scorer, He played almost all of his career in Zamalek. Taha represented Egypt at the 1934 World Cup and the 1936 Summer Olympics. He is the Zamalek's all-time goal scorer in the Cairo derby with 12 goals. He retired as captain of Zamalek in 1945.

== Career ==
=== Club career ===
Taha started his youth career in Zamalek in 1925. He was 18 when played his first game for the first team in the 1928–29 season, he won with Zamalek in his first season the 1928–29 Cairo League title.

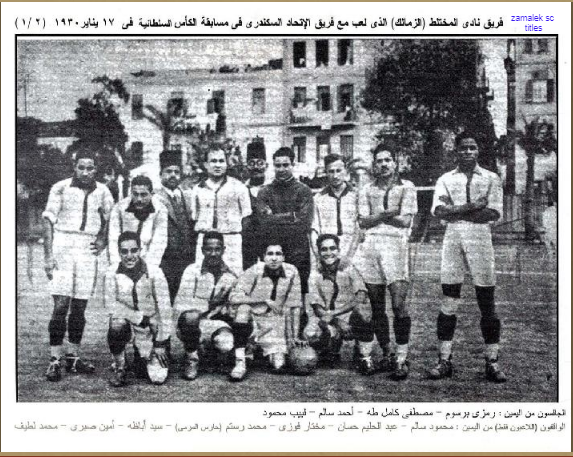
Taha (second sitting from right) with Zamalek in 1930

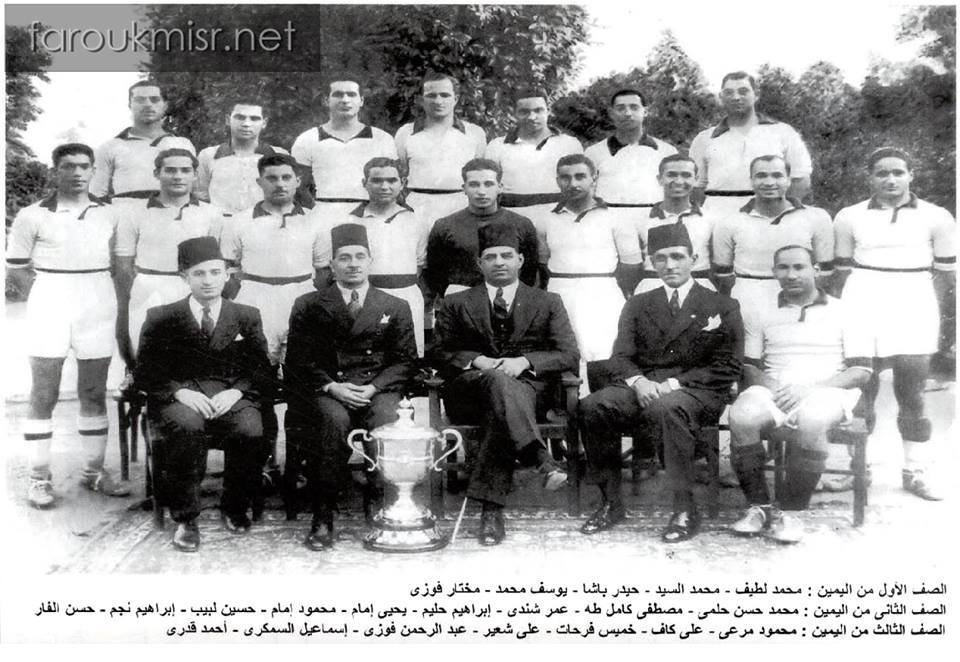
Taha (second from right, front standing row) with Zamalek in 1939

In Zamalek, Taha played in the prime of his career with Egyptian veteran players such as Mohamed Latif, Hussein Hegazi, El-Sayed Abaza and Ismail Raafat. He scored his first goal in the Cairo derby in the 1929–30 season. In 1931, Taha made a surprise move to arch rival Al Ahly, he played with them for two seasons until 1933, then he moved back to Zamalek and played until the end of his career. Taha scored over 100 goals with Zamalek, he won with Zamalek seven Cairo League titles (1928–29, 1929–30, 1933–34, 1939–40, 1940–41, 1943–44, 1944–45), five Egypt Cup titles in (1935, 1938, 1941, 1943, 1944) and the King Fouad Cup twice in (1934, 1941). He was Zamalek's captain in the early 1940s, he was the one who lifted the 1944 Egypt Cup trophy, this cup's final was a historical match with Zamalek's highest victory over Al Ahly with a score of 6–0, which is the largest score in the history of the Egypt Cup final matches and in the history of the Cairo derby.

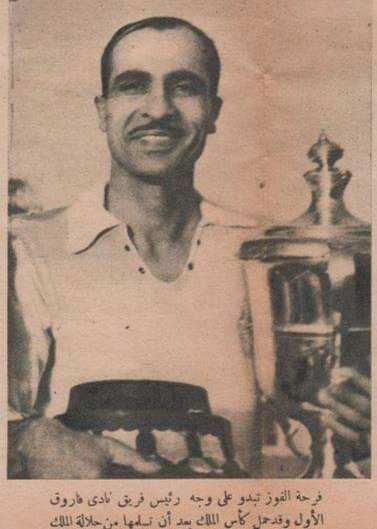
Taha, Zamalek's captain with the Egypt Cup trophy in 1944

He was a prolific goal scorer, he is the second all-time top scorer of the Cairo derby with 15 goals and Zamalek's all-time top scorer of the derby with 12 goals. He changed his position and played as a defender in the last three seasons of his career. After winning the 1944–45 Cairo League's season, Taha retired from professional football in 1945.

=== International career ===
Taha played his first international game with the Egypt national football team in 1929. He was part of the team that played in the 1934 World Cup, and played Egypt's game in the group stage.

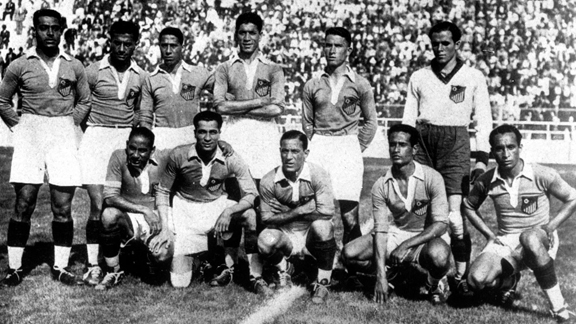
Taha (front row, second from left) with Egypt in the 1934 World Cup in Italy

Taha was also part of the team that played in that 1936 Olympics in Berlin, and was in the starting lineup. He played for his country until 1940, as there was no official tournaments due to the outbreak of World War II.

== Honours and achievements ==
Zamalek

- Egypt Cup: 1934–35, 1937–38, 1940–41, 1942–43, 1943–44
- Cairo League: 1928–29, 1929–30, 1933–34, 1939–40, 1940–41, 1943–44, 1944–45
- King's Cup: 1934, 1941

Al Ahly

- Egypt Cup: 1930–31
- Cairo League: 1930–31
- Sultan Hussein Cup: 1931
