= Mohamed Latif =

Egyptian footballer (1909–1990)

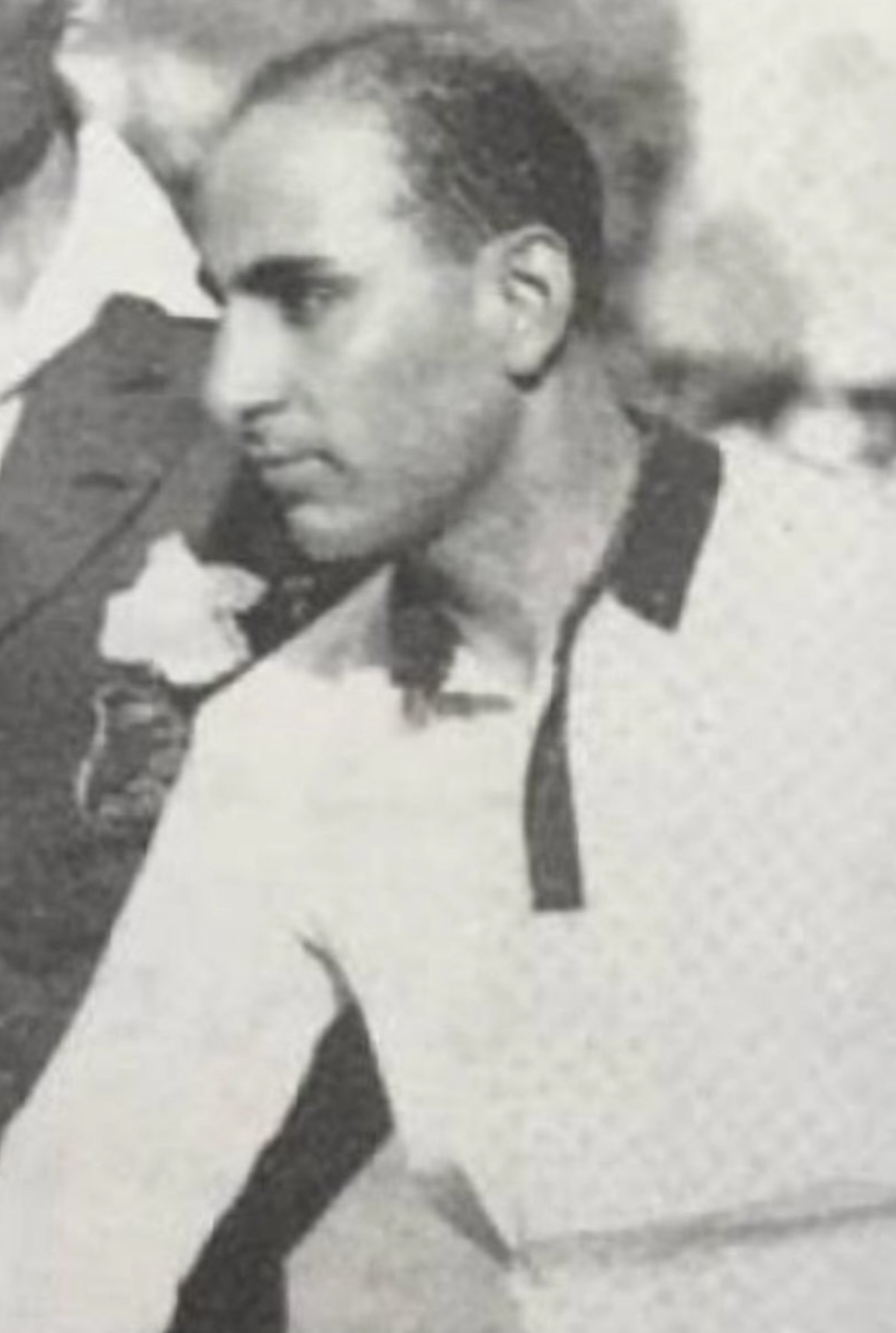
- Latif with Zamalek in 1940

Personal information
- Date of birth: 23 October 1909
- Place of birth: Beni Suef, Egypt
- Date of death: 17 March 1990 (aged 80)
- Place of death: Cairo, Egypt
- Height: 1.69 m (5 ft 7 in)
- Position: Forward

Senior career*
Years	Team	Apps	(Gls)
1926–1935	Zamalek		
1935–1936	Rangers	1	(0)
1936–1945	Zamalek		

International career
1932–1942	Egypt		

Managerial career
- Zamalek
- * Club domestic league appearances and goals

Mohamed Latif (Arabic: مُحَمَّد لَطِيف; 23 October 1909 – 17 March 1990) was an Egyptian football manager, pundit, referee and executive. He was a former professional footballer. He played for the clubs El-Zamalek of Egypt and Rangers F.C. of Scotland, as well as for the Egypt national team.

== Early life ==
He was born on October 23, 1909 in Beni Suef Governorate, to a middle class family. He joined the Khedivial School and became the team's captain and right winger. He won the Schools Cup with his school in 1920. His first match with the Khedivial School against the Saidiya School, he was chosen to play in the school's first team against Mokhtar El Tetsh and Abdel Rahman Fawzy. He was chosen by Hussein Hegazi to join Zamalek in 1926.

== Playing career ==
=== Club career ===
Latif started his professional career in Zamalek in 1926, he was the main Zamalek's forward for nine seasons. After a brief spell in Rangers in 1935, he returned to Zamalek in the 1936–37 and played until his retirement in 1945. Latif won with Zamalek six titles of the Egypt Cup (1931–32, 1934–35, 1937–38, 1940–41, 1942–43, 1943–44).

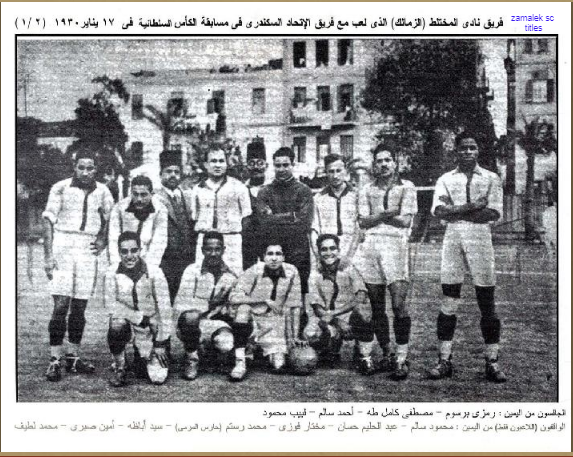
Latif (first standing from left) with Zamalek in 1930

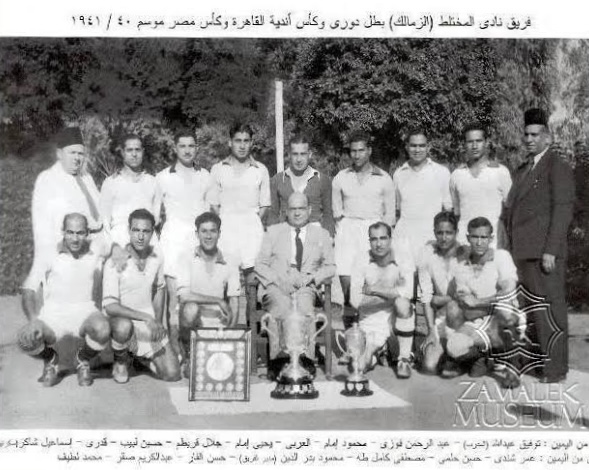
Latif (first sitting from left) with Zamalek's squad which dominated all football competitions in Egypt; Egypt Cup, Cairo League and King's Cup, 1941

He also won with his team the Cairo League for eight seasons (1928–29, 1929–30, 1931–32, 1933–34, 1939–40, 1940–41, 1943–44, 1944–45), and two titles of the King Fouad Cup (1933–34, 1940–41). Latif scored six goals in the Cairo derby, he was Zamalek's captain in the early 1940s. After the World Cup, Latif went to Glasgow, as did goalkeeper Mustafa Mansour, possibly at the suggestion of Egypt's national coach, Scotsman James McRea. He played his only Scottish League match for Rangers in the 1935–36 season, against Hibs.

=== International career ===
Latif helped the Egypt national team qualify for the 1934 World Cup, scoring three goals against the Mandatory Palestine football team during the qualification rounds. He also played at the finals tournament with Egypt in the group stage.

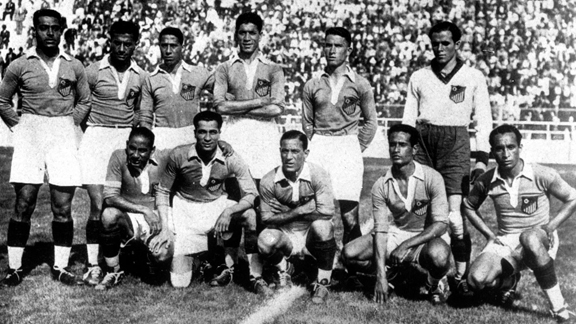
Latif (Lower row, first from left) with Egypt at the 1934 FIFA World Cup in Italy

In 1936, he was part of the Egyptian team that played in the Olympic tournament in Berlin. He played for Egypt for 10 years. Due to the outbreak of World War II, he was unlucky as all sports activities were cancelled.

== Post retirement career ==
After retirement from football, he worked as a referee in the 1940s until he earned the international badge and officiated many international matches. Latif also held several managerial roles in the Egyptian Football Association during the 1950s. He also worked as Zamalek's coach in the early 1960s. He won the 1962 Egypt Cup title with Zamalek as the head coach. He was the first to introduce football commentary on television and was the General Head of sports programs in the Egyptian Television for 16 years. He has broadcast World Cup matches since 1962.

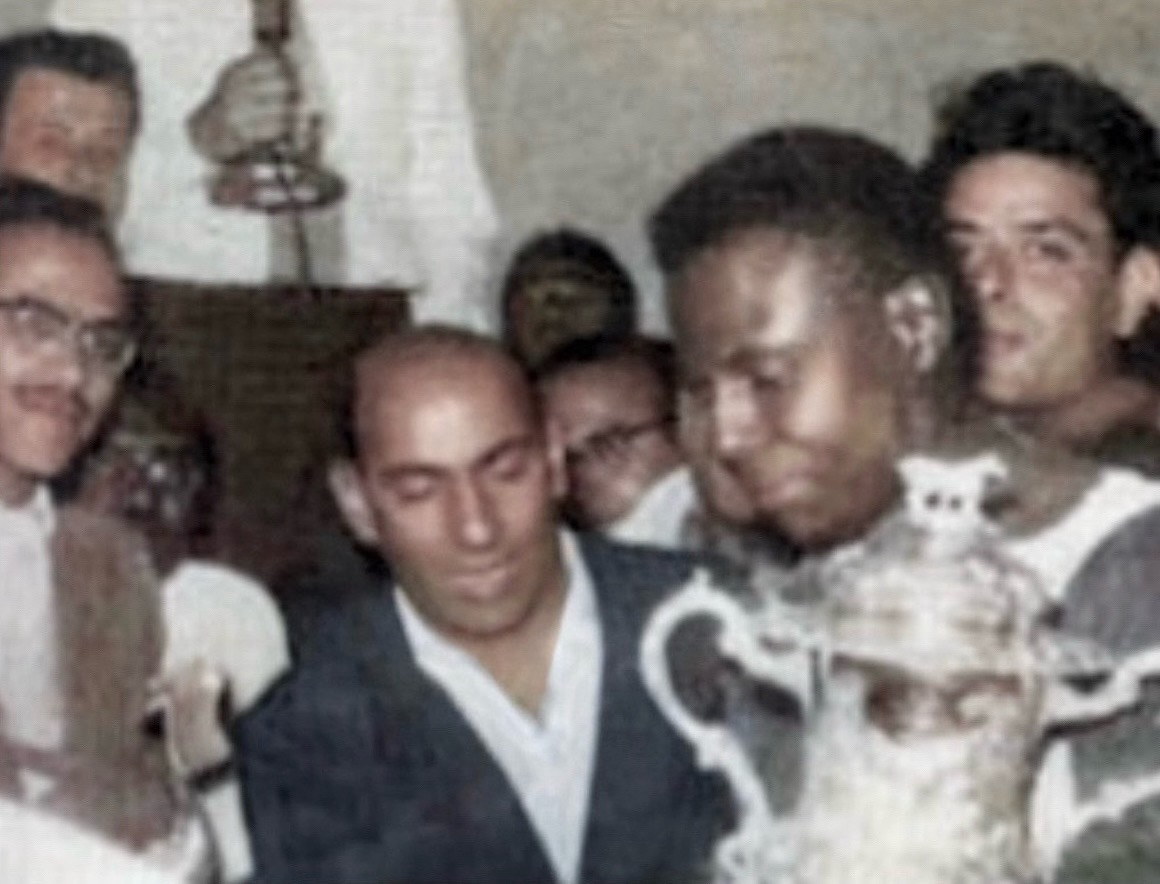
Latif with Egypt's captain Hanafy Bastan after winning the 1957 African Cup of Nations

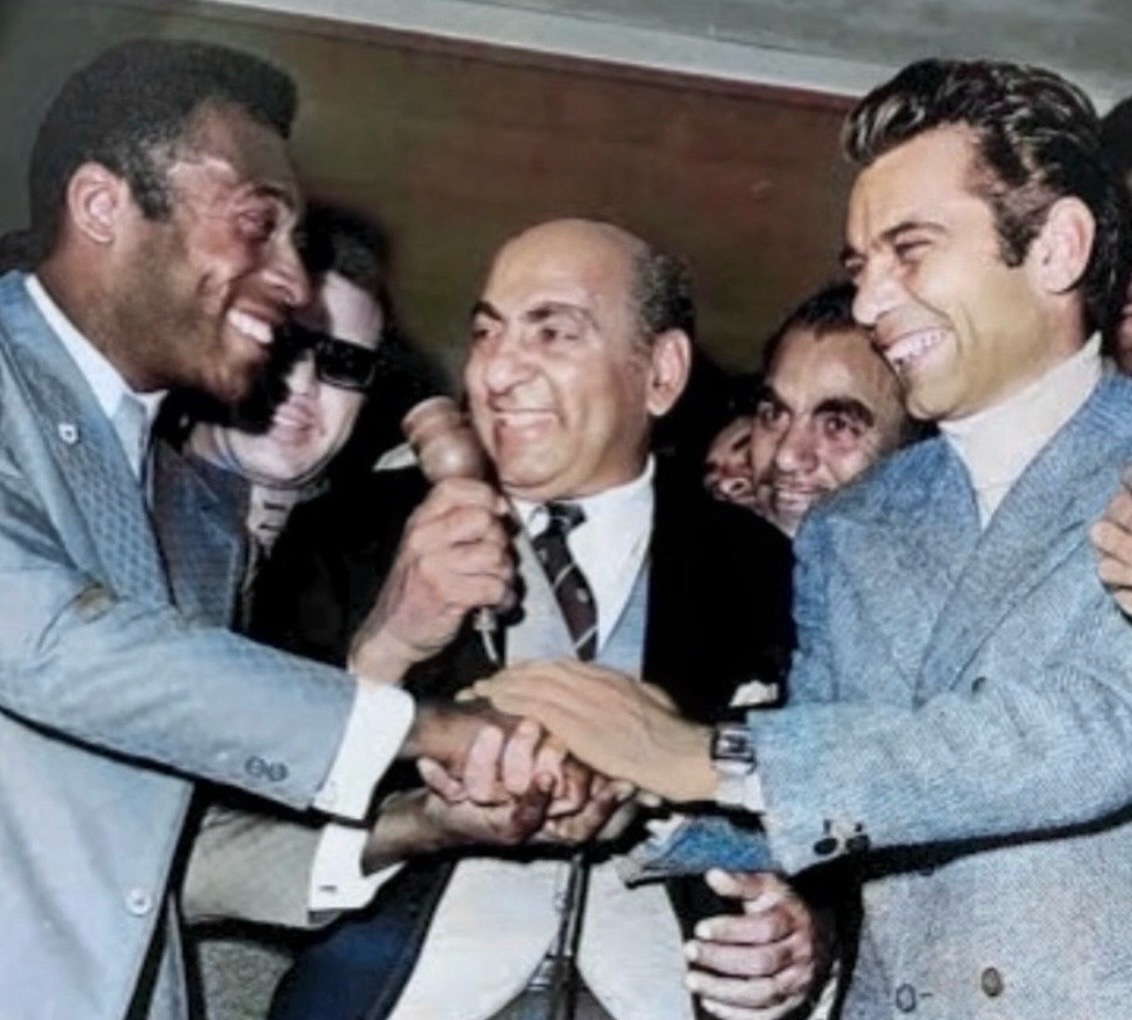
Latif (middle) with Pelé and Saleh Selim in Cairo, February 1973

His fame increased when, in 1948, he moved into the field of commentating on matches in radio, and he remained with the microphone until his death on 17 March 1990. He was called the Sheikh of Commentators. Mohamed Latif was distinguished by his own distinctive style in commenting on football matches, and his commentary was of great importance, especially in the Cairo derby matches.

He has reached such an extent of fame that he was hosted in Egyptian films as a sports commentator on football matches. Perhaps among the most prominent of these films is the film Stranger in My House starring Soad Hosny and Nour El Sherif, and the film In Summer We Must Love starring Salah Zulfikar and Samir Ghanem.

== Honours ==
=== Player ===
Zamalek

- Egypt Cup: 1932, 1935, 1938, 1941, 1943, 1944
- Cairo League: 1928–29, 1929–30, 1931–32, 1933–34, 1939–40, 1940–41, 1943–44, 1944–45
- King's Cup: 1933–34, 1940–41

Egypt

- Summer Olympics: fourth place 1928

=== Manager ===
Zamalek

- Egypt Cup: 1962
