= Yehia Emam =

Egyptian footballer (1919–1997)

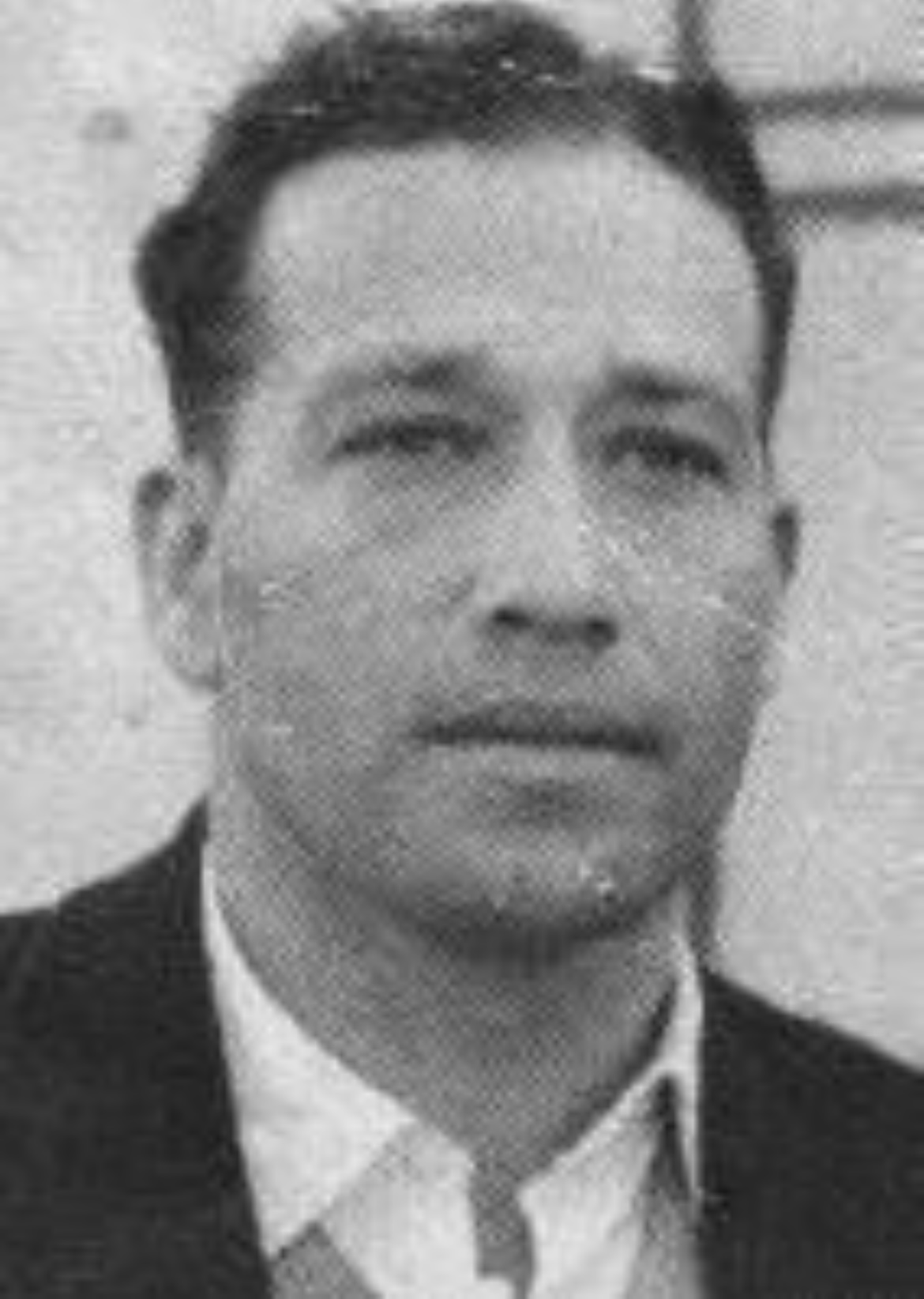
- Emam in 1951

Personal information
- Full name: Yehia el-Horria Mohamed Emam
- Date of birth: 15 May 1919
- Place of birth: Cairo, Sultanate of Egypt
- Date of death: 11 April 1997 (aged 77)
- Place of death: Cairo, Egypt
- Position: Goalkeeper

Youth career
- 1933–1937: Zamalek

Senior career*
Years	Team	Apps	(Gls)
1937–1953	Zamalek		

International career
1940–1953	Egypt		
Medal record
Men's football
Representing Egypt
Mediterranean Games
Silver medal – second place	1951
Arab Games
Gold medal – first place	1953
- * Club domestic league appearances and goals

Yehia el-Horria Mohamed Emam (Arabic: يحيى الحرية محمد إمام; 15 May 1919 – 11 April 1997) was an Egyptian footballer who played as a goalkeeper for Zamalek. He also played for the Egypt national football team. He is considered one of the best Egyptian goalkeepers of all time. He represented his country in the 1948 Summer Olympics, 1951 Mediterranean Games, 1952 Summer Olympics and the 1953 Pan Arab Games. Emam played for his whole career in Zamalek and won 15 titles for his club.

== Biography ==
Emam was born in Cairo on 15 May 1919. He was born during the 1919 Revolution and was named Yehia El-Horreya which means in Arabic: Long Live the Freedom. He joined the Egyptian Military College in 1936, and graduated as a military officer in the Egyptian Armed Forces.

He started his career in Zamalek in the youth team, he played throughout his career in Zamalek, he won with his team five Egypt Cup titles; (1938, 1941, 1943, 1944, 1952). With Emam guarding Zamalek's goal, they won the Cairo League for nine seasons; (1939–40, 1940–41, 1943–44, 1944–45, 1946–47, 1948–49, 1950–51, 1951–52, 1952–53). Yehia Emam is considered a symbol for Zamalek fans and one of the best goalkeepers in the history of the club.

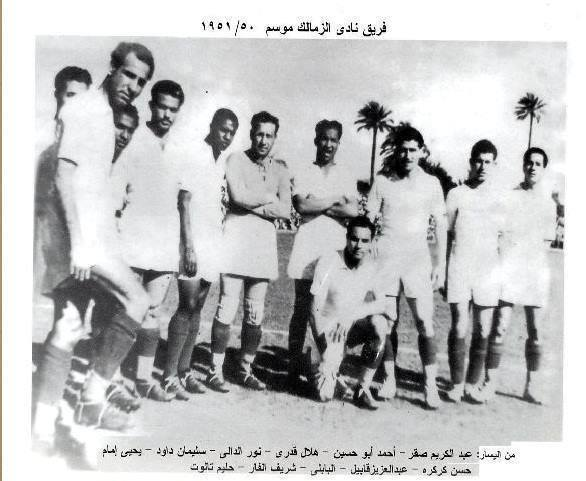
Emam (sixth form left) with Zamalek in the 1950–1951 season

Emam was called to represent the Egypt national football team in 1940. He captained Egypt in the 1948 Summer Olympics in London and the 1952 Summer Olympics in Helsinki. He played with his country in the Mediterranean Games and Egypt won the silver medal in the 1951 Mediterranean Games in Alexandria. He was the captain of the team that won the gold medal of the 1953 Arab Games. Emam retired in 1953.

He worked as a military officer in the Egyptian Armed Forces for his entire career. He was married and he's the father of the Zamalek's legend Hamada Emam and grandfather of Zamalek's legend Hazem Emam. Emam died in Cairo on 11 April 1997, at the age of 77.

== Honours ==
Zamalek SC

- Egypt Cup / King Farouk Cup: (5)
  1937–38, 1940–41, 1942–43, 1943–44, 1951–52
- Cairo League: (9)
  1939–40, 1940–41, 1943–44, 1944–45, 1946–47, 1948–49, 1950–51, 1951–52, 1952–53
- King Fouad Cup: (1)
  1940–41

Egypt

- Mediterranean Games:
  Silver: 1951
- Arab Games:
  1953
