= Abdelrahman Fawzy =

Egyptian footballer (1911–1988)

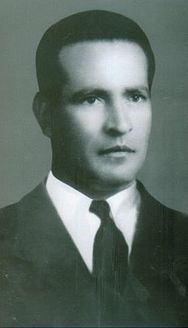

Personal information
- Full name: Abdelrahman Fawzy
- Date of birth: 25 May 1911
- Place of birth: Port Said, Khedivate of Egypt
- Date of death: 16 October 1988 (aged 77)
- Place of death: Cairo, Egypt
- Height: 1.75 m (5 ft 9 in)
- Position: Centre-forward

Senior career*
| Years | Team | Apps | (Gls) |
| 1928–1934 | Al-Masry | | |
| 1934–1947 | Zamalek SC | | |

International career
| 1934 | Egypt | 3 | (3) |

Managerial career
- 1946–1956: Zamalek SC
- 1953–1954: Egypt (National Committee)
- 1956: Ghazl El Mahalla
- 1957–1962: Saudi Arabia
- 1960–1961: El Sekka El Hadid
- 1975: El Sekka El Hadid
Medal record
Men's football as manager
Representing Egypt
Arab Games
| Gold medal – first place | 1953 |
- * Club domestic league appearances and goals

Abdelrahman Fawzy (Arabic: عَبْد الرَّحْمٰن فَوْزِيّ) (May 25, 1911 – October 16, 1988) was an Egyptian professional football player and manager, who played as a centre forward.

He played for Al-Masry SC and Zamalek SC (where he spent most of his career) as well as the Egypt national football team. He took part at the 1934 FIFA World Cup, where he scored twice for Egypt in their 4–2 loss against Hungary, which was the first time (and the only time before 1970) that an African team had competed at the FIFA World Cup. He was thus, the first African footballer to score at the World Cup. He would have been the first African to score a hat trick at the World Cup (a feat not yet achieved by any African footballer to date) but his third goal was disallowed. The Egyptian goalkeeper that day, Mustafa Mansour, later said:

"When the game was 2–2, my colleague Fawzy took the ball from the centre and dribbled past all the Hungarian players to score a third goal. But the referee cancelled the goal as an offside!"

== Early life ==
Fawzy was born in the Egyptian city Port Said, Khedivate of Egypt on 25 May 1911.

== Club career ==
=== Al-Masry ===
Fawzy began his career in 1928 with his hometown club, Al-Masry SC. He played with the club till 1934, a total of 6 seasons. He won with them the Sultan Hussein Cup 2 times (1933, 1934) and the Canal Zone League 3 times (1932, 1933, 1934).

=== Zamalek ===
In 1934, Fawzy moved to Cairo-based club Zamalek SC where he spent most of his career, as he played with the Cairo giants until his retirement from football in 1947, playing with Zamalek a total of 12 seasons.

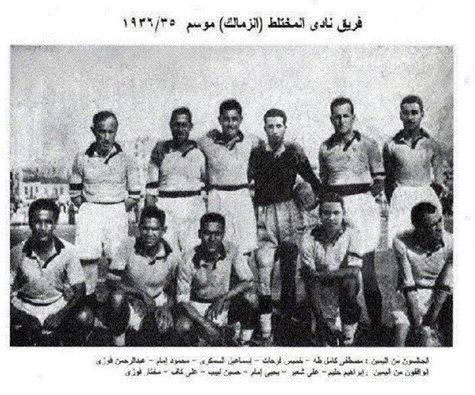
Fawzy (first sitting from left) with Zamalek in 1935

Fawzy scored twice in the infamous 6-0 win for Zamalek over Al Ahly in the 1942 Cairo Derby. He won with Zamalek the Egypt Cup 5 times (1935, 1938, 1941, 1943, 1944) and the Cairo League 5 times (1939–40, 1940–41, 1943–44, 1944–45, 1946–47).

== International career ==
Fawzy played for the Egypt national team. He was among the team that competed in the 1934 World Cup qualifiers, in which Egypt won 11–2 on aggregate of the two matches against the Mandatory Palestine national team, with seven goals in the match that was held in Cairo, which ended with a score of 7–1 and four goals in the match that was held in Jerusalem, which ended with a score of 4–1, with Fawzy scoring the fourth goal for Egypt.

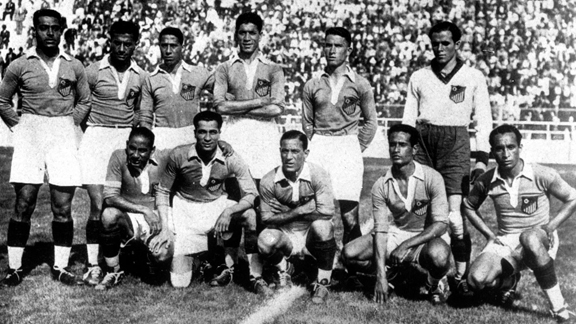
Egypt National Football Team in the 1934 FIFA World Cup, Fawzy (Upper row, second from right)

At the 1934 FIFA World Cup, Fawzy participated in the match against Hungary and scored two goals as the match ended 4–2 in favor of Hungary. Mustafa Mansour, Egypt's goalkeeper at that match, stated that Fawzy scored the third goal for Egypt, when the result was a 2–2 tie between the two teams, but the referee canceled it for an offside offence despite him playing the ball from the centre of the field. Fawzy is the first ever African footballer to score at the FIFA World Cup. He is also Egypt's top goalscorer at the World Cup with 2 goals.

== Managerial career ==
In 1946, after retiring from professional football, Fawzy worked as a manager for his former club Zamalek SC (known as Farouk until 1952). In 1953, while managing Zamalek, Fawzy became the manager of the Egypt national football team. Fawzy led the Egypt national team to win the 1953 Pan Arab Games football tournament with a 4–0 victory over Syria in the final. Unlike his performance as a player, they failed to qualify to the 1954 FIFA World Cup after losing their two matches against Italy in the qualification rounds, after that Fawzy was no longer the manager of the Egypt national football team, after one year in that position.

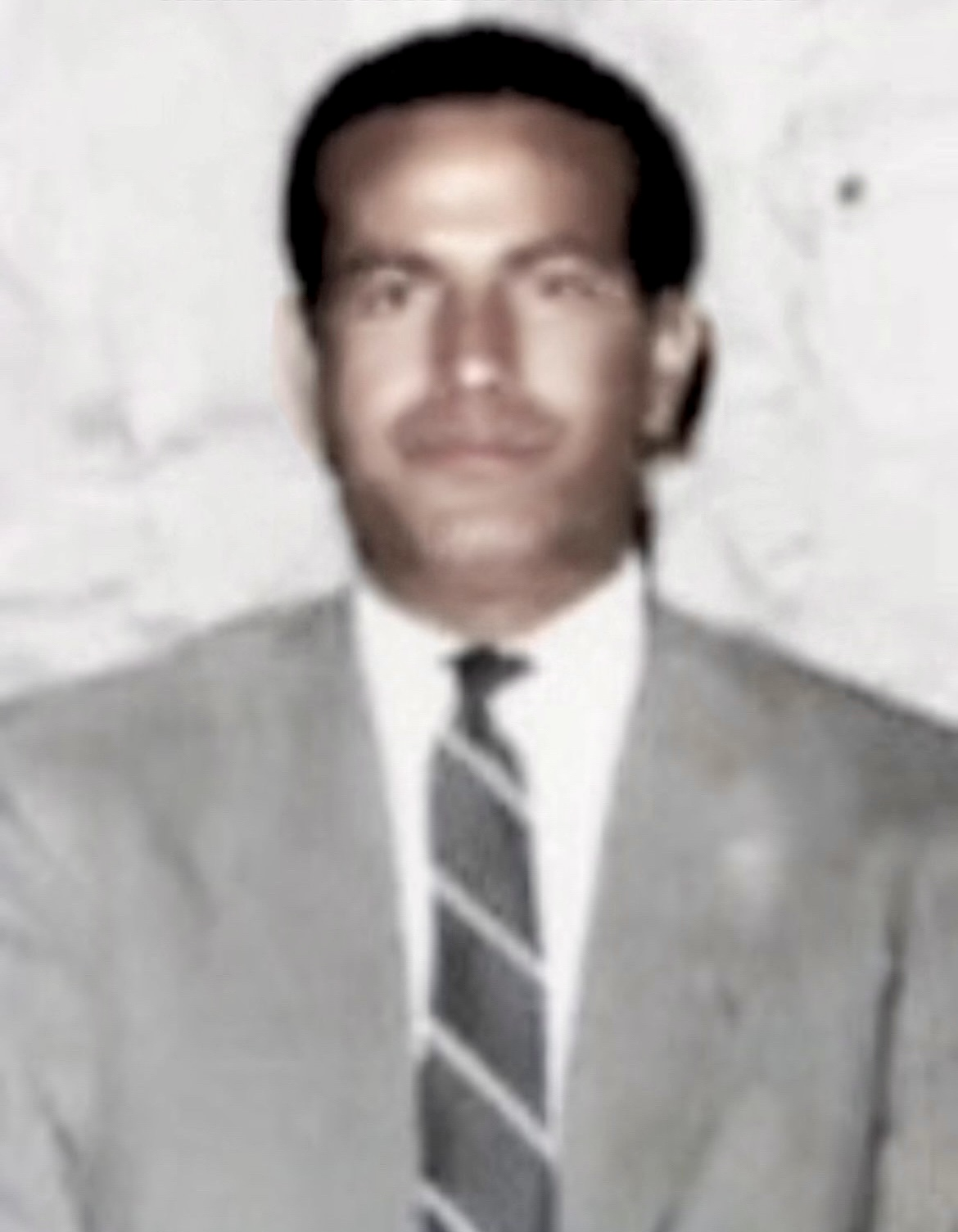
Fawzy in 1952

In 1956, Fawzy became the first manager in the history of Egyptian football to manage two clubs at the same time, when he managed Ghazl El Mahalla, playing in the Egyptian Second Division at that time, alongside him managing Zamalek. He led Ghazl El Mahalla, in that season, to their first promotion to the Egyptian Premier League. He resigned from his position as Ghazl El Mahalla manager, after one season, he also resigned from his post with Zamalek after 10 years of managing the team, making him the longest-serving manager in the history of Zamalek to date. With Zamalek, Fawzy won the Egypt Cup 2 times (1952, 1955) and the Cairo League 5 times (1946–47, 1948–49, 1950–51, 1951–52, 1952–53), a total of seven titles, making him the most successful manager in the history of the club. In 1957, Fawzy became the first manager of the Saudi Arabia national football team, after the establishment of the team in 1956, and he kept this position for 5 years until 1962. In 1960, while managing the Saudi Arabia national football team, Fawzy worked as the manager of Egyptian club El Sekka El Hadid, he worked only for one season until 1961. After leaving the Saudi Arabia national football team in 1962, Fawzy took a 13 years hiatus, before coming back to manage El Sekka El Hadid for one more season in 1975. After that single season, Fawzy retired from football altogether.

== Personal life ==
Fawzy is the father of Major General Dr. Hazem Fawzy, the founder and the former head of Financial Affairs department in the Egyptian Armed Forces Finance Authority.

Former board member of Zamalek SC during the period of club president Hassan Amer from 1984 to 1988, and during the period of club presidents Hassan Abo Elfottoh and Nour Eldally from 1988 to 1992, former board member of the Egyptian football association (EFA) during the period of EFA president Farouk Abo Elezz in 1988, and former member of the board of Automobile & Touring Club of Egypt during the period of the president Mokbel Shaker from 2002 to 2004.

Also, he is the father of Major General Dr. Ahmed-Sherin Fawzy, the former governor of Monufia from 2013 to 2015. the Former chairman of Telemisr Company, one of the largest companies in the Middle East, for producing electric and electronic equipments from 96 to 1999, and he was a Captain in the Egyptian air force during October war in 1973, former board member of Zamalek SC during the period of club president Hassan Abo Elfottoh from 1988 to 1990, former board member of Zamalek SC during the first period of club president Galal Ibrahim 1992 to 1996, and former board member of Zamalek SC during the second period of club president Galal Ibrahim, from 2010 to 2011.

He is the father of Muhammad Fawzy, the former agent of the Accountability State Authority and the Table Tennis Federation chose Mohamed Abdel Rahman Fawzy, a former member of the board of directors of Zamalek SC during the period of club president Kamal Darwish, to head the Giza region till now.

He is also the father of Major General Dr. Ezz-Aldein Fawzy, the former medical attache for the Egyptian embassy in London, United Kingdom and the former agent of the Egyptian General Intelligence Directorate.

He is also the father of Dr. Gamal Fawzy, the former agent of the Egyptian General Intelligence Directorate and the resident doctor for the Egyptian president Abdel Fattah el-Sisi in the Heliopolis Palace.

== Death ==
Fawzy died on 16 October 1988 in Cairo, Egypt at the age of 78. One week after his death, Zamylek SC's administration named the club's covered arena by his name in his honor, the Abdelrahman Fawzy Hall. Just one year later, Egypt qualified to their second World Cup.

== Career statistics ==
=== International ===
==== International statistics ====
As of match played 27 May 1934.

Appearances and goals by national team, year and competition
| National team | Year | Apps | Goals |
|---|---|---|---|
| Egypt | 1934 | 3 (Note: Two appearances and one goal in the 1934 FIFA World Cup qualification, one appearance and two goals in the 1934 FIFA World Cup) | 3 |
| Total | | 3 | 3 |

==== International goals ====
As of match played 27 May 1934. Egypt score listed first, score column indicates score after each Fawzy goal.

| No. | Cap | Date | Venue | Opponent | Score | Result | Competition | Ref. |
|---|---|---|---|---|---|---|---|---|
| 1 | 2 | 6 April 1934 | Palms Stadium, Tel Aviv, Mandatory Palestine | Mandatory Palestine | 4–0 | 4–1 | 1934 FIFA World Cup qualification | |
| 2 | 3 | 27 May 1934 | Stadio Giorgio Ascarelli, Naples, Italy | Hungary | 2–1 | 4–2 | 1934 FIFA World Cup | |
| 3 | 3 | 27 May 1934 | Stadio Giorgio Ascarelli, Naples, Italy | Hungary | 2–2 | 4–2 | 1934 FIFA World Cup | |

== Honours ==
=== Player ===
Al-Masry

- Sultan Hussein Cup (2): 1933, 1934
- Canal Zone League (3): 1931–32, 1932–33, 1933–34

Zamalek

- Egypt Cup (5): 1934–35, 1937–38, 1940–41, 1942–43, 1943–44
- Cairo League (5): 1939–40, 1940–41, 1943–44, 1944–45, 1946–47
- King's Cup (1): 1940–41

=== Manager ===
Zamalek

- Egypt Cup (2): 1951–52, 1954–55
- Cairo League (5): 1946–47, 1948–49, 1950–51, 1951–52, 1952–53

Egypt

- Pan Arab Games: 1953

== See also ==
- African nations at the FIFA World Cup
- Egypt at the FIFA World Cup
