= Tewfik Abdullah =

Egyptian footballer (1896–1963)

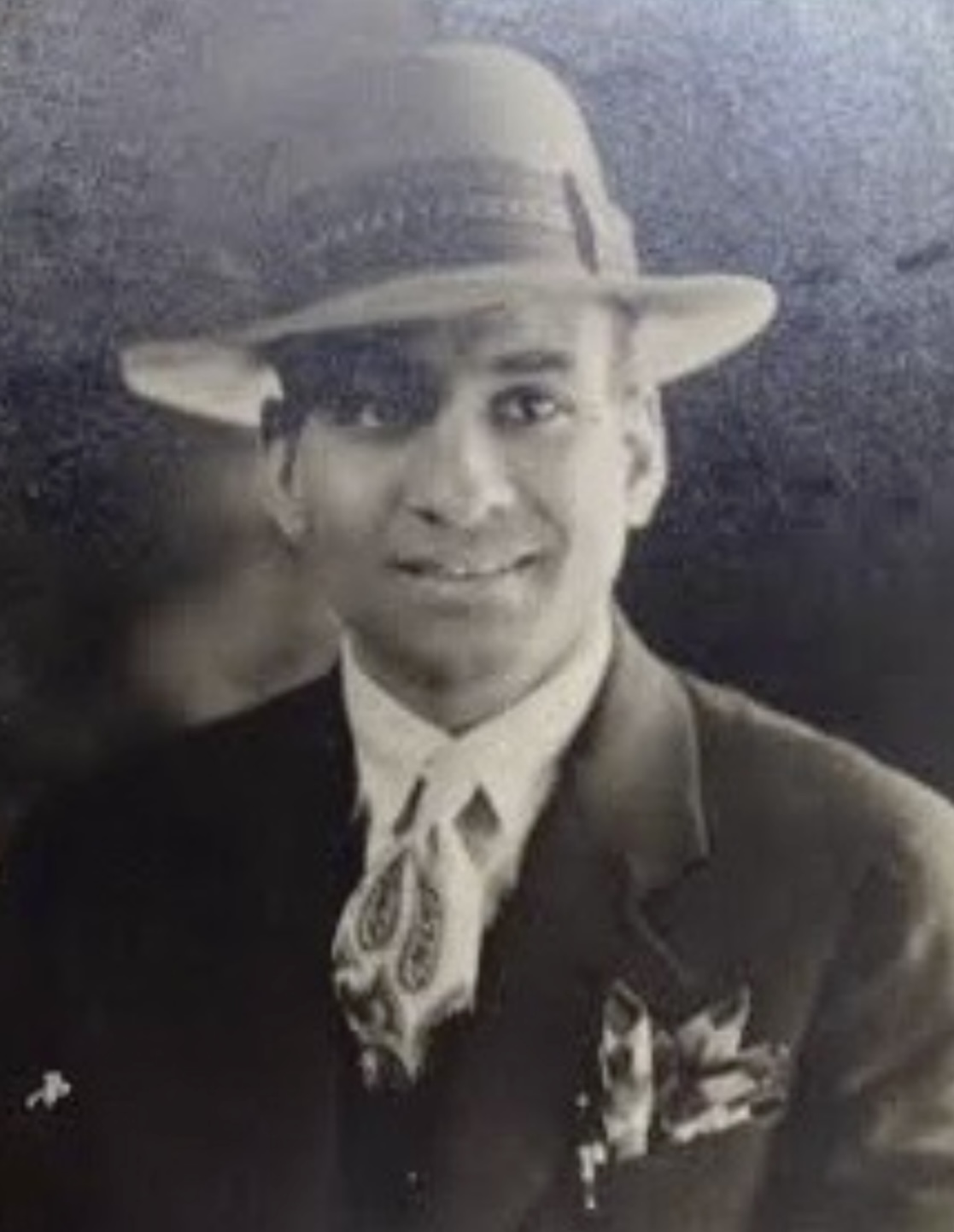
- Abdullah in 1936

Personal information
- Full name: Tewfik Abdullah
- Date of birth: 23 June 1896
- Place of birth: Cairo, Egypt
- Date of death: 1963

Senior career*
Years	Team	Apps	(Gls)
1916–1917	Al Masry Cairo		
1917–1919	Cairo		
1918–1919	Mokhtalat		
1920–1921	Derby County	15	(1)
1921–1922	Cowdenbeath		
1922–1923	Bridgend Town	6	(1)
1923-1924	Hartlepools United	11	(1)
1924–1927	Providence Clamdiggers	8	(0)
1926-1927	Fall River F.C.	1	(1)
1927-1928	Hartford Americans		
1928	New York Nationals		
1928	Fall River F.C.		
1928	Montréal Carsteel FC		
1928–1930	Al Ahly		
1930–1932	Mokhtalat		
1932–1933	El Sekka El Hadid SC		

International career
1920	Egypt	2	(0)

Managerial career
- 1934–1945: Zamalek
- 1940–1944: Egypt
- * Club domestic league appearances and goals

Tewfik Abdullah (Arabic: توفيق عبد الله, also Tawfik Abdallah and variations) (23 June 1896 – 1963) was an Egyptian football player and manager. He began his career with Zamalek, and played for Egypt in the 1920 Summer Olympics. He was the second Egyptian to play in the English League and the first in the First Division. He was one of four Egyptians who played professional football in Britain before World War Il.

After a decade with Zamalek, Abdullah moved to English League. In England he featured for Derby County in the First Division. He further was active for some lower division clubs in England, Scotland and Wales before playing for several clubs in the American Soccer League between 1924 and 1928. There he won the National Challenge Cup with the Fall River F.C. After returning to Egypt he won the Egypt Cup with Al Ahly before returning back to Zamalek, where he won with the team the 1932 Egypt Cup, and the Cairo League in 1931–32 season. He finished his playing career in Canada. Later he was manager of Zamalek and the Egypt national football team.

== Playing career ==
=== Beginnings in Egypt's Zamalek - Olympics 1920 ===
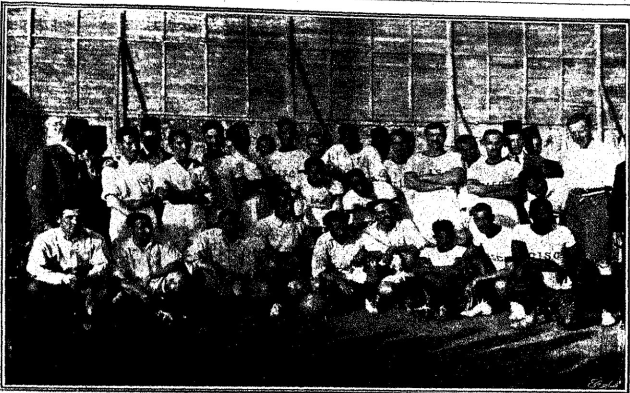
Zamalek squad in 1917

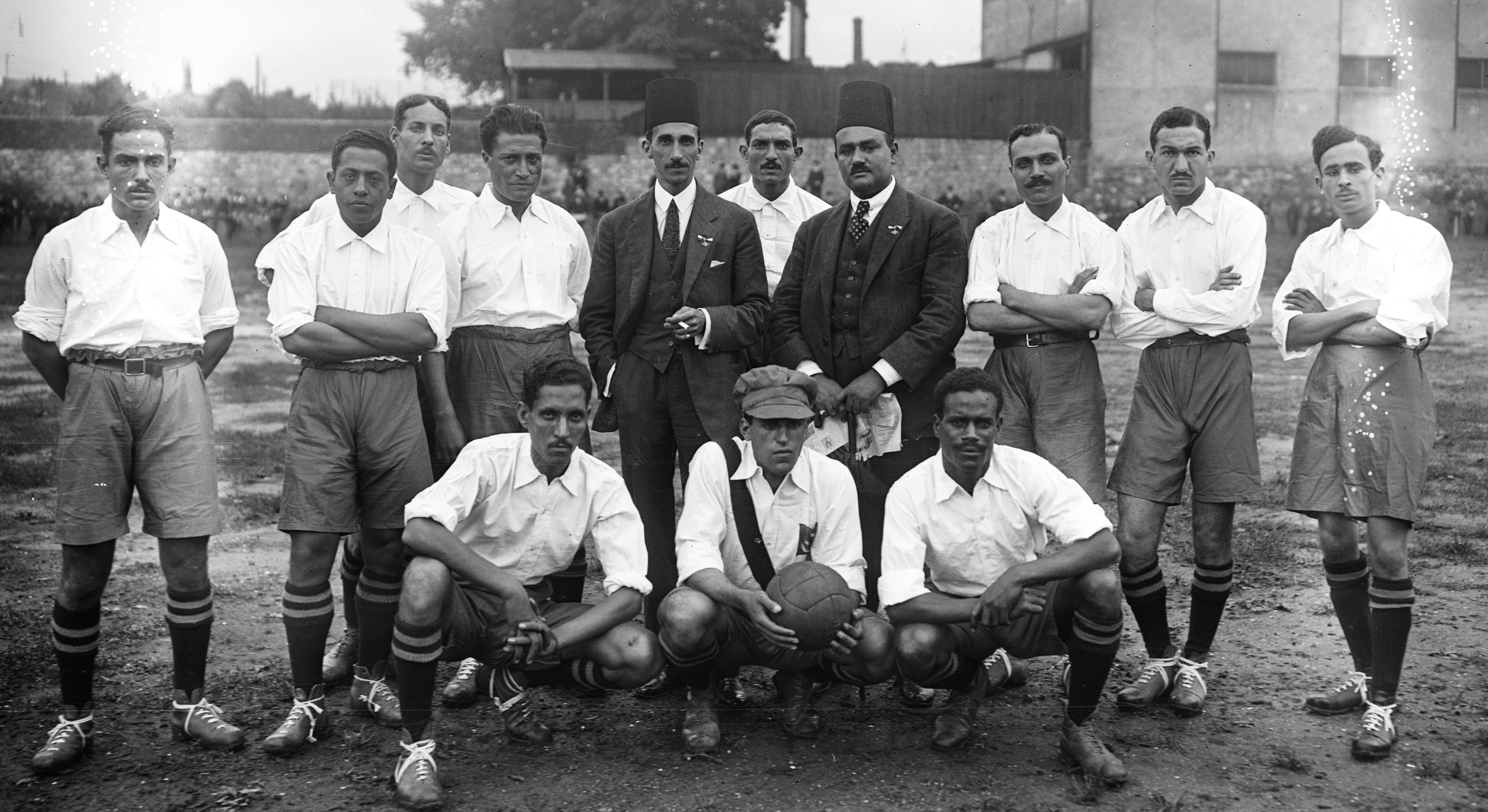
Egypt at the 1920 Summer Olympics

Tewfik Abdullah initially started his career in the youth team of Zamalek SC (Cairo International SC), he spent eight years in the club. With the Egyptian national team her participated at the 1920 Olympic Games in the Belgian city of Antwerp. There Egypt was ousted 1-2 in the first round by Italy. After this Egypt defeated Yugoslavia in a "consolation match" with 4-2. He participated in both matches.

=== United Kingdom ===
The Scottish Derby County player Tommy Barbour encountered Abdullah first, when he served with the Derbyshire Yeomanry in Egypt during the Great War. There he was inside right of an Egyptian XI which played the British Army in Cairo. After recommendation of Barbour Abdullah was tried out in a match of the Derby County reserves in mid September 1920. After he "pleased the crowd immensely" there, he was signed by the club a week later. He played his first match in the First Division in October, where he scored the first goal for the Rams in a 3–0 home win against Manchester City. Abdullah, whose first name Tewfik was soon transformed into his nickname "Toothpick", thus became the second Egyptian in professional English football after Hussein Hegazi, who played with him in the 1920 Olympics and who spent some years with Dulwich Hamlet FC in the Isthmian League and in 1911 completed a match with London's Fulham FC in the Second Division. Abdullah's goal against City should remain his only goal and only win in a dozen league matches for Derby County in the 1920/21-season which ended in relegation. He stayed on, but got little playing time in the Second Division. Abdullah's ability with the ball found praise, but he was said to lack speed.

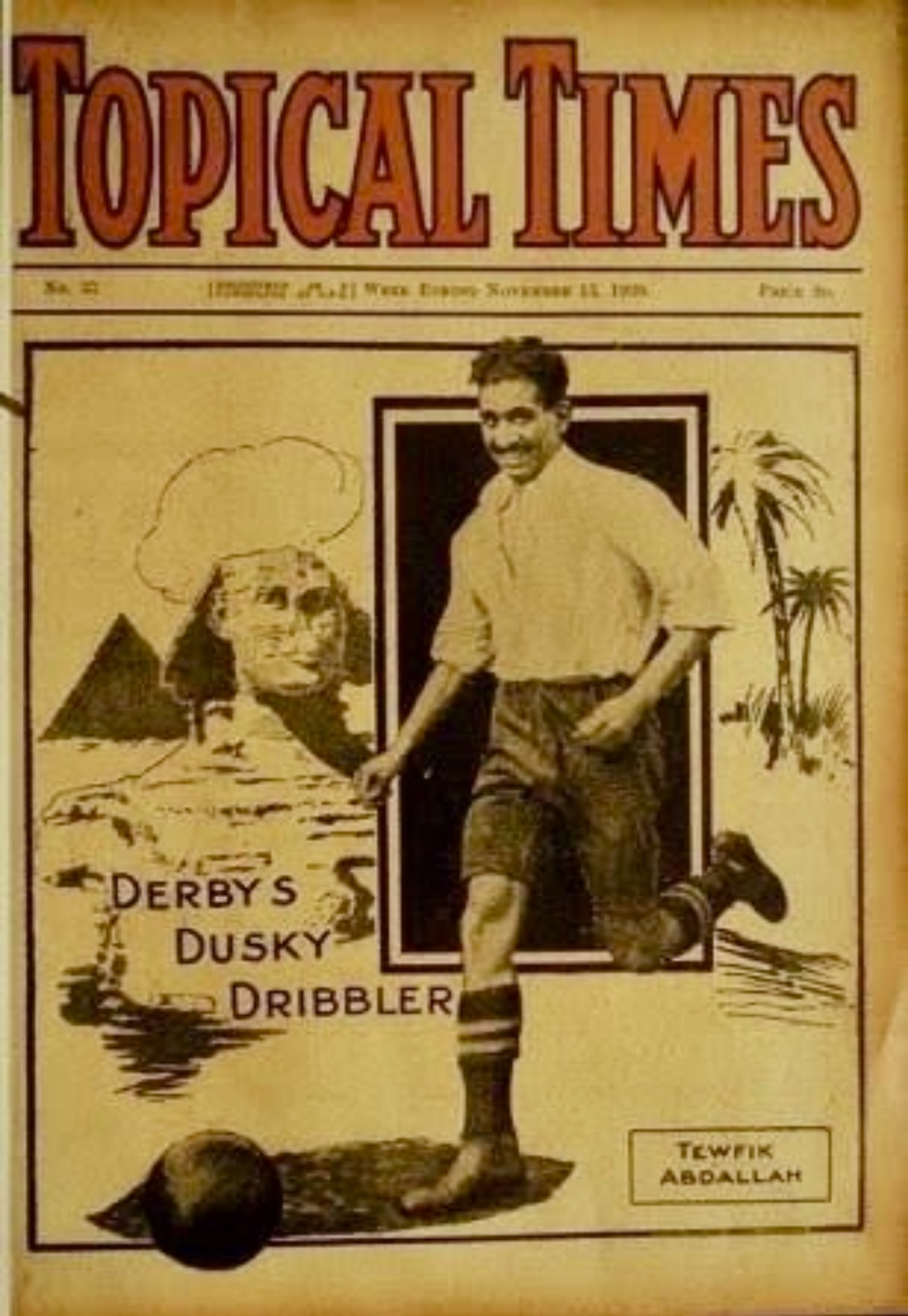
Tewfik Abdullah on the cover for Topical Times magazine, 1922

For the 1922/23 season, he joined the Scottish second division club Cowdenbeath FC which should finish eleventh. This transfer was made on the recommendation of his Derby teammate Willie Paterson, whose father Alex Paterson was coaching the Scots. Abdullah soon broke his arm there, but otherwise played well and regularly. In a later review, Alex Paterson described him as one of the "smartest footballers" he ever encountered. At the end of the season, it was initially said that he would go to America despite an offer to stay. Eventually, he moved to Bridgend Town in Wales, which was to be 13th in the Western Division of the Southern Football League. He played there until late February or early March 1924.

At the beginning of March 1924 he returned to England and joined Hartlepools United in the Third Division North, staying until early May. There he scored in his debut at the 4-0 debut against Wrexham. After the game, it was reported that he had increased the impact of the Hartlepools attack significantly and that he had gained a lot of weight and strength since he left Derby County. He was considered a "god-send", but Hartlepools finished the season on the penultimate place. For Abdullah, who played a total of eleven times, one goal stood.

=== American Soccer League ===
As a result of the expansion of the American Soccer League for the 1924/25 season from eight to twelve teams, the steady stream of British, especially Scottish, footballers to the United States increased. There, the players besides a place in the team, got a job, mostly in the factory of the team owner, which then earned them up to three times the three or four pounds that the British clubs usually paid per week.

Abdullah joined the Providence Clamdiggers in Rhode Island. Abdullah, soon to be given the new nickname "Happy", ended the season there with 15 goals in 34 games. In 1925/26 he only managed seven goals in ten games and then two goals in 18 games. In three years he had accumulated 62 appearances and 24 goals for the Clamdiggers.

Later in the 1926/27 season, he moved to the Fall River F.C. in Massachusetts, a top team of the time, for which he scored once in six matches until the end of the season. With the 'Marksmen', where he played again with Willie Paterson, he won the National Challenge Cup, predecessor of the US Open Cup, of 1927, albeit he was not on the pitch in the final. On 2 April 1927, he was also in a selection of the ASL, which was defeated 2-4 against the well-staffed national team of Uruguay. A week later he was part of a 1–1 draw against Uruguay with the 'Marksmen'.

For the 1927/28 season, he switched to the newly founded Hartford Americans. The club withdrew early in the season and Abdullah only played eleven times for the Connecticut side. Until the end of the year, he then played eight games for the New York Nationals which were created at the beginning of the season by the controversial entrepreneur Charles Stoneham by transferring the Indiana Flooring franchise to the east coast metropolis. Still in 1928 followed a short comeback to the 'Marksmen' where in February 1928 he had two games in which he marked one goal.

=== Return to Egypt - career end in Canada ===
Once he returned to Egypt he joined Al Ahly SC of Cairo, winning the Sultan Hussein Cup of 1929 contributing one goal to the 2-0 victory against Scottish military side Dirhams in the final. In the following year he won the Egypt Cup with a 2–0 win in the final over Al Ittihad of Alexandria. After this he returned to Zamalek SC winning the 1932 Egypt Cup with a 2–1 victory over Al Ahly. He also won with Zamalek the Cairo League in the 1931–32 season. It is reported, that in 1932 he returned to North America, joining Montreal Carsteel in Canada, where he saw out his playing years. The club won the Coupe du Québec, the Cup of Quebec, in the years of 1932 to 1934, and he might have been involved in the winning of these trophies.

== Management ==
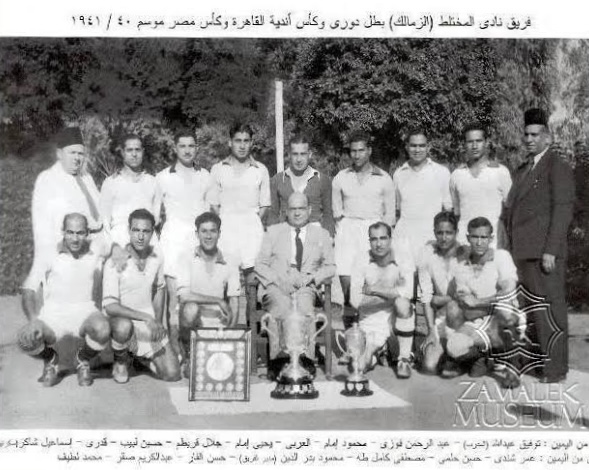
Zamalek's manager Abdullah (first from right) with Zamalek in 1941

After this he attempted to establish himself as coach in North America. As he did not succeed, he returned to Egypt, and retired from professional football. After retirement, he worked as a coach, he managed Zamalek from 1937 to 1945. While he was Zamalek's manager, he headed the Egyptian national team between 1940 and 1944. As Zamalek's manager, he won the Egypt Cup for four times in (1938, 1941, 1943, 1944), and four titles of the Cairo League in (1939–40, 1940–41, 1943–44, 1944–45), and the King's Cup once in 1940–41.

== Honours ==
=== Player ===
Fall River F.C.

- National Challenge Cup: 1927

New York Nationals (ASL)

- National Challenge Cup: 1928

Al Ahly

- Sultan Hussein Cup: 1929
- Egypt Cup: 1930

Zamalek

- Egypt Cup: 1932
- Cairo League: 1931–32

=== Manager ===
Zamalek

- Egypt Cup: 1937–38, 1940–41, 1942–43, 1943–44
- Cairo League: 1939–40, 1940–41, 1943–44, 1944–45
- King's Cup: 1940–41
