= Abdel-Karim Sakr =

Egyptian footballer (1918-1994)

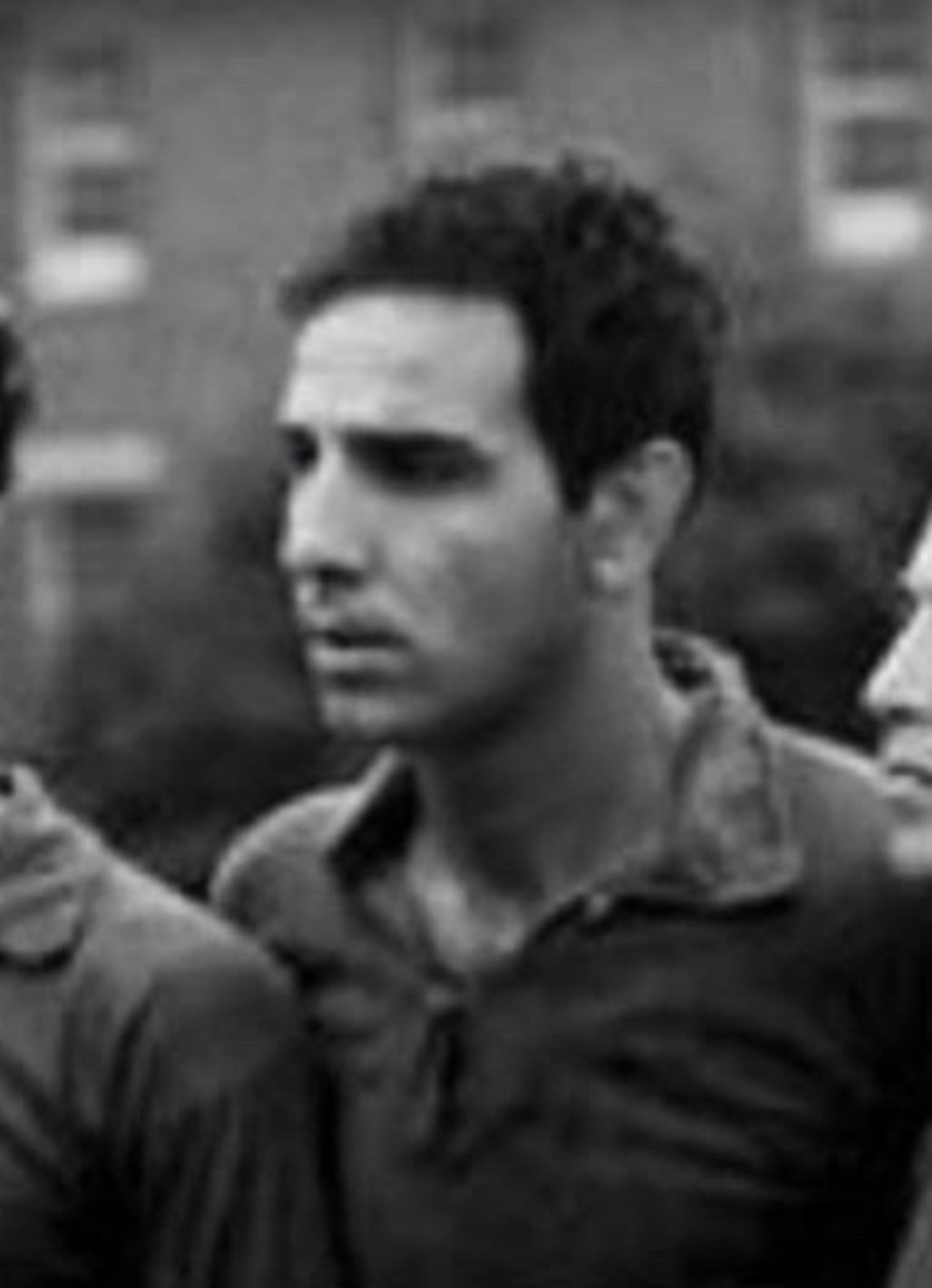
- Sakr in 1948

Personal information
- Full name: Abdel-Karim Ezzat Sakr
- Date of birth: 8 November 1918
- Place of birth: Cairo, Egypt
- Date of death: 5 March 1994 (aged 75)
- Place of death: Cairo, Egypt
- Position: Forward

Senior career*
Years	Team	Apps	(Gls)
1935–1939	Al Ahly		
1939–1953	Zamalek		

International career
1936–1950	Egypt		
- * Club domestic league appearances and goals

Abdel-Karim Ezzat Sakr (Arabic: عبد الكريم عزت صقر; born 8 November 1918 – 5 March 1994) was an Egyptian football forward who played for Egypt and Zamalek. He played most of his career with Zamalek, and achieved 14 titles with the club. Starting his professional career with Al Ahly, he is the all-time top-scorer of the Cairo Derby, with 19 goals (10 goals for Zamalek and 9 goals for Al Ahly). Sakr is the only player to score in both derbies ending with the largest score in history, as Zamalek defeated Al Ahly with a score of 6–0 twice, in the 1941–42 Cairo League and the 1944 Egypt Cup Final, respectively.

== Career ==
Sakr joined Al Ahly, he scored hattrick in his first match against Zamalek to be the second player to score hattrick in the history of the Cairo Derby in 1937, the match ended 5-0 for Al Ahly and El Tetsh scored the other two goals.

In 1939, Sakr moved to Zamalek from Al Ahly for the then a record amount of 50 Egyptian pound. He achieved an outstanding record with the team. He won with Zamalek the Cairo League title for nine seasons, and four titles of the Egypt Cup and the King Fouad Cup once. Sakr scored twice in two Cairo derbies, when Zamalek won Al Ahly with a score of 6–0 in the two games, in the 1941–42 Cairo League and 1944 Egypt Cup final.

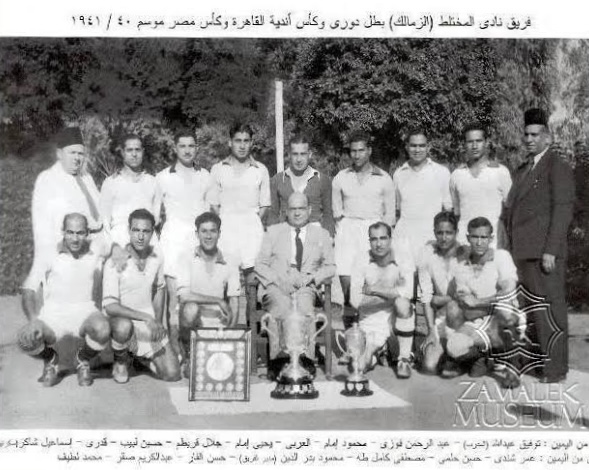
Sakr (second sitting from left) with Zamalek in 1941

Sakr is the all-time goal scorer of the Cairo derby with a record of 19 goals (10 for Zamalek and 9 for Al Ahly), a record which hasn’t been broken to date. He spent almost fifteen years at the White Castle, scoring many goals for his club. He achieved 14 titles with Zamalek, winning the Egypt Cup in (1940-41, 1942-43, 1943-44, 1951-52), the Cairo League (1939-40, 1940-41, 1943-44, 1944-45, 1946-47, 1948-49, 1950-51, 1951-52, 1952-53), and the King Fouad Cup in (1940-41).

In 1945, He was offered a £40,000 contract to play for Huddersfield Town but he refused and returned to Egypt with his fellow player Mohamed El-Guindi. Sakr played for Zamalek for 14 consecutive seasons, he achieved an impressive record with the team, and scored over 100 goals for Zamalek in all competitions.

He represented Egypt in the 1936 Summer Olympics when he was 17 years old, scoring Egypt's only goal in the tournament. He also represented his country in the 1948 Summer Olympics. Sakr played almost 26 international caps with his country and scored 14 international goals.

== Honours ==
Al Ahly

- Egypt Cup: 1936–37
- Cairo League: 1935–36, 1936–37, 1937–38, 1938–39
- Sultan Hussein Cup: 1937–38

Zamalek

- Egypt Cup: 1940–41, 1942–43, 1943–44, 1951–52
- Cairo League: 1939–40, 1940–41, 1943–44, 1944–45, 1946–47, 1948–49, 1950–51, 1951–52, 1952–53
- King Fouad Cup: 1940–41
