= Mohammed Hassan Helmy =

Egyptian footballer (1912–1986)

Helmy Zamora
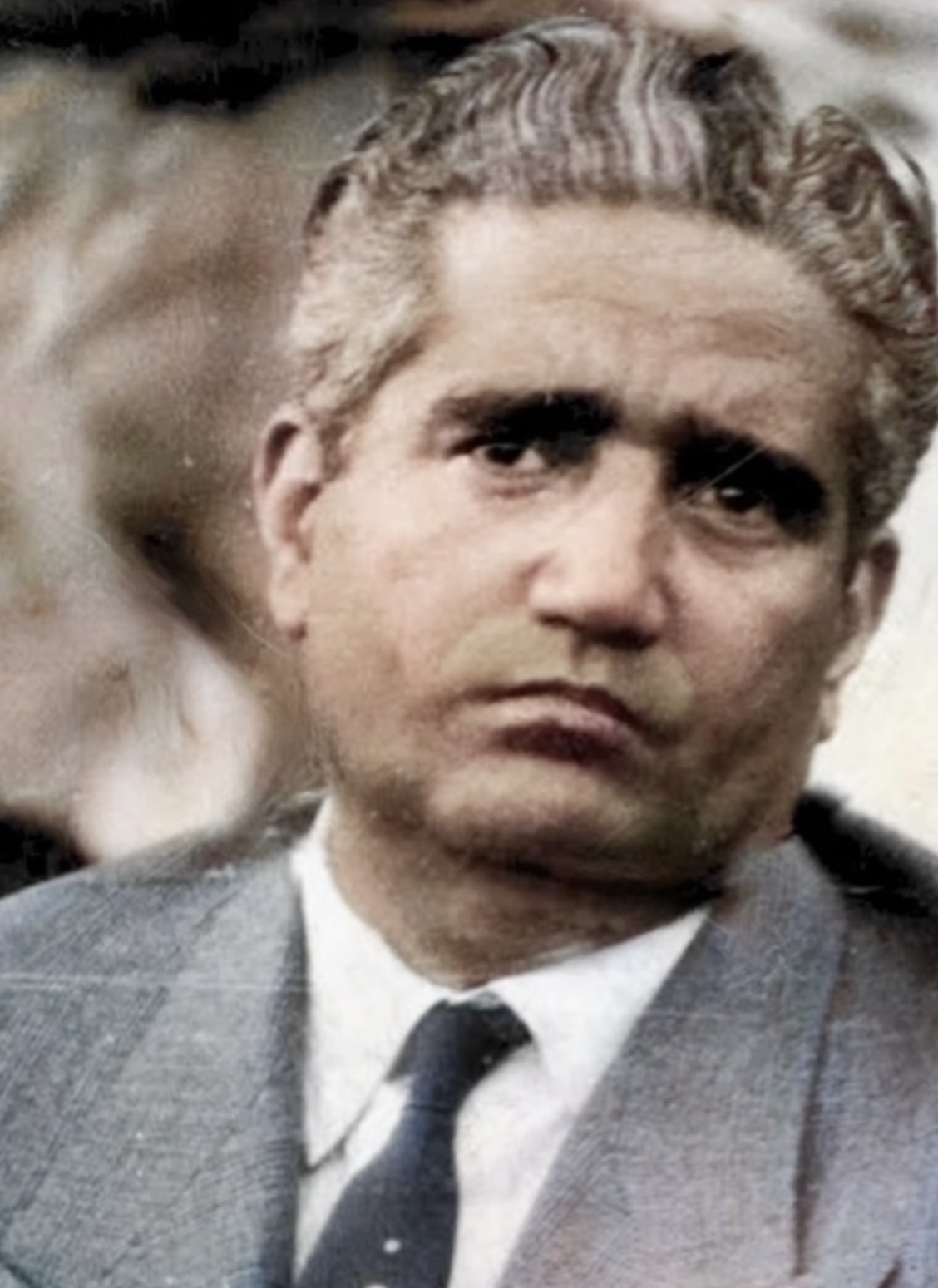
- Helmy Zamora in 1963

11th President of Zamalek SC
- In office 1967–1971

13th President of Zamalek SC
- In office 1973–1984

Personal details
- Born: Mohammed Hassan Helmy; 13 February 1912 Meet Kenana, Qalyubia, Egypt
- Died: 5 November 1986 (aged 74) Cairo, Egypt
Association football career
- Position: Winger
Youth career
- 1929–1934: Zamalek
Senior career*
Years	Team	Apps	(Gls)
1934–1948	Zamalek		
International career
1936–1946	Egypt		
- * Club domestic league appearances and goals

Mohammed Hassan Helmy (Arabic: محمد حسن حلمي; 13 February 1912 – 5 November 1986) commonly known as Helmy Zamora, was an Egyptian footballer who played for Zamalek and the Egypt national team as a winger. He is widely regarded as one of the most important figures in the history of Zamalek, having served as its president for three periods, between 1967 and 1984. As a player, he represented Egypt in the 1936 Summer Olympics, but he did not play in any matches. Zamora spent his entire career with Zamalek winning eleven titles.

After his retirement, he worked as a sports director, board member and other posts in Zamalek Club, until he held the presidency in 1967. Helmy Zamora is the first footballer to hold the presidency of a club in Egypt. Besides Mohammed Haidar Pasha, he is considered one of the best presidents of Zamalek throughout its long history, he's also regarded as one of the most influential figures in Egyptian football history. Zamalek's official stadium is named after him.

== Early life ==
He was born on 13 February 1912 in the village of Mit Kenana in Qalyubia Governorate. He began playing football in Muhammadiyah Primary School, and in 1929 he played in the first team of the Khedive Secondary School and joined the Zamalek youth team in the same year.

== Playing career ==
In 1934, Helmy Zamora's breakthrough with Zamalek was when Gamil El-Zobair, the left winger of the first team, was injured, and Zamora played instead, and he played a good game, from then he was always in the starting lineup. Zamora won with Zamalek the Egypt Cup for five times (1935, 1938, 1941, 1943, 1944). He also won the Cairo League title for six seasons (1939–40, 1940–41, 1943–44, 1944–45, 1945–46, 1946–47).

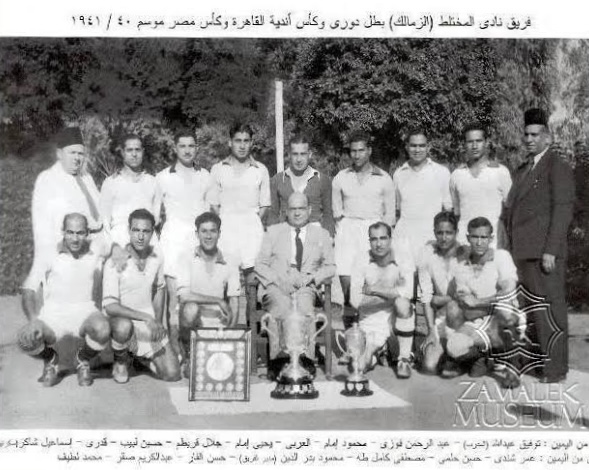
Helmy Zamora (second sitting from right) with Zamalek in 1941

Zamora scored several goals in the Cairo derby, however, his most famous of all was his goal in the 1942 Cairo derby match against Al Ahly which Zamalek won by a score of 6–0, a record which had not been broken to date. Mohammed Haidar Pasha, president of the Zamalek Club in the 1930s and 1940s, gave him the nickname Zamora due to scoring in the famous Spanish goalkeeper Ricardo Zamora. He retired from football in 1948.

Zamora began his international career when he was first called in 1936, when he was selected for the Egypt national team participating in the 1936 Olympics in Berlin. He played for Egypt for 10 years.

== Administrative career ==
In 1938, Helmy Zamora obtained a Bachelor’s degree in Agriculture. He worked from 1938 to 1972 in the Ministry of Agriculture until he reached the position of Deputy Minister. He worked in his job besides his football career as a player and manager.

After his retirement from football, he worked as a referee until he obtained the international badge in 1957, and he remained an international referee until he reached his retirement age in 1962. Helmy Zamora began his managerial career as a member of the Football Committee of Zamalek in 1948, and four years later he was chosen as General Secretary of the club in the first general assembly in Zamalek, then he was appointed full-time director of the club in 1966 in the same year in which he was chosen as the club’s Deputy.

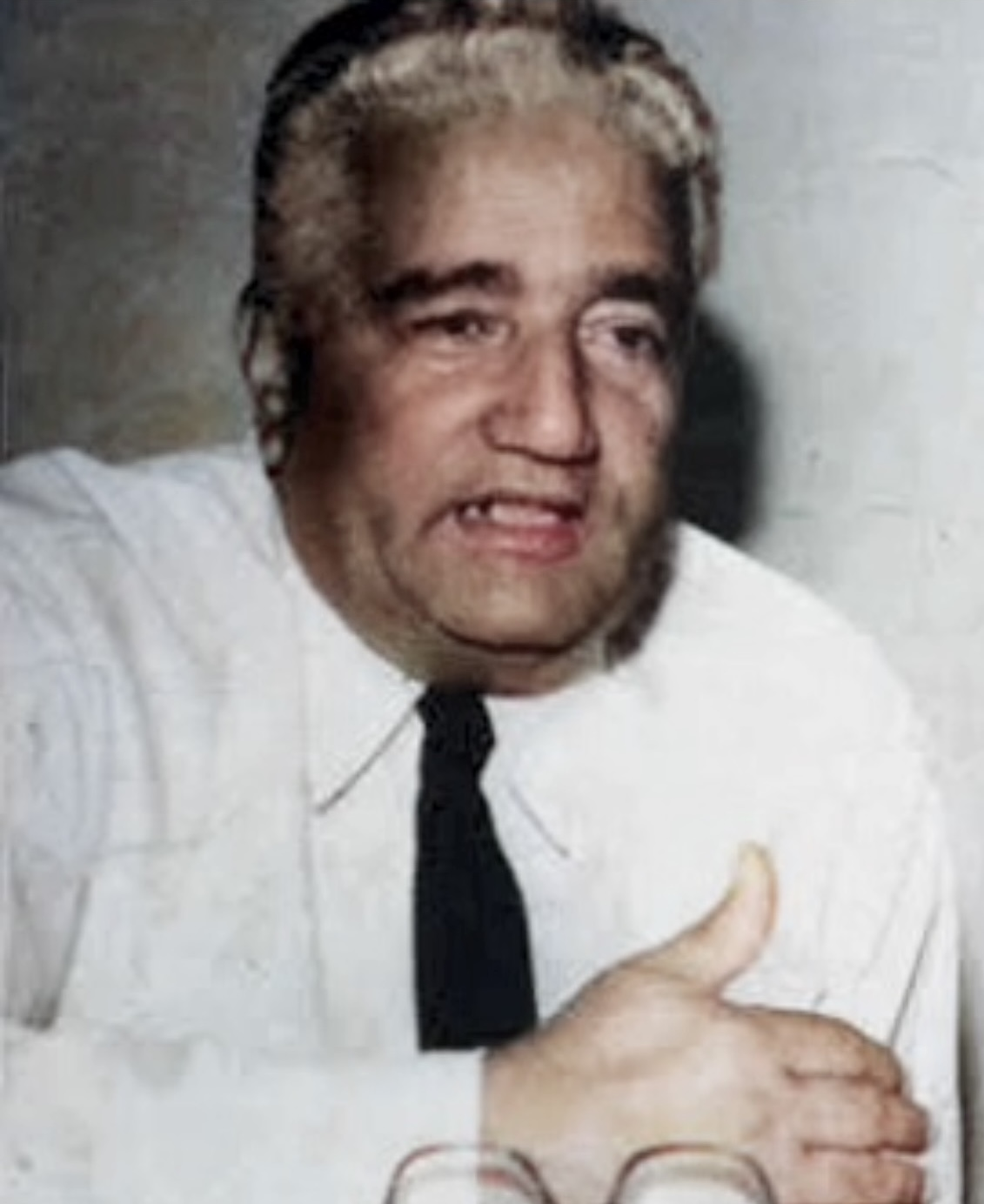
Helmy Zamora in 1981

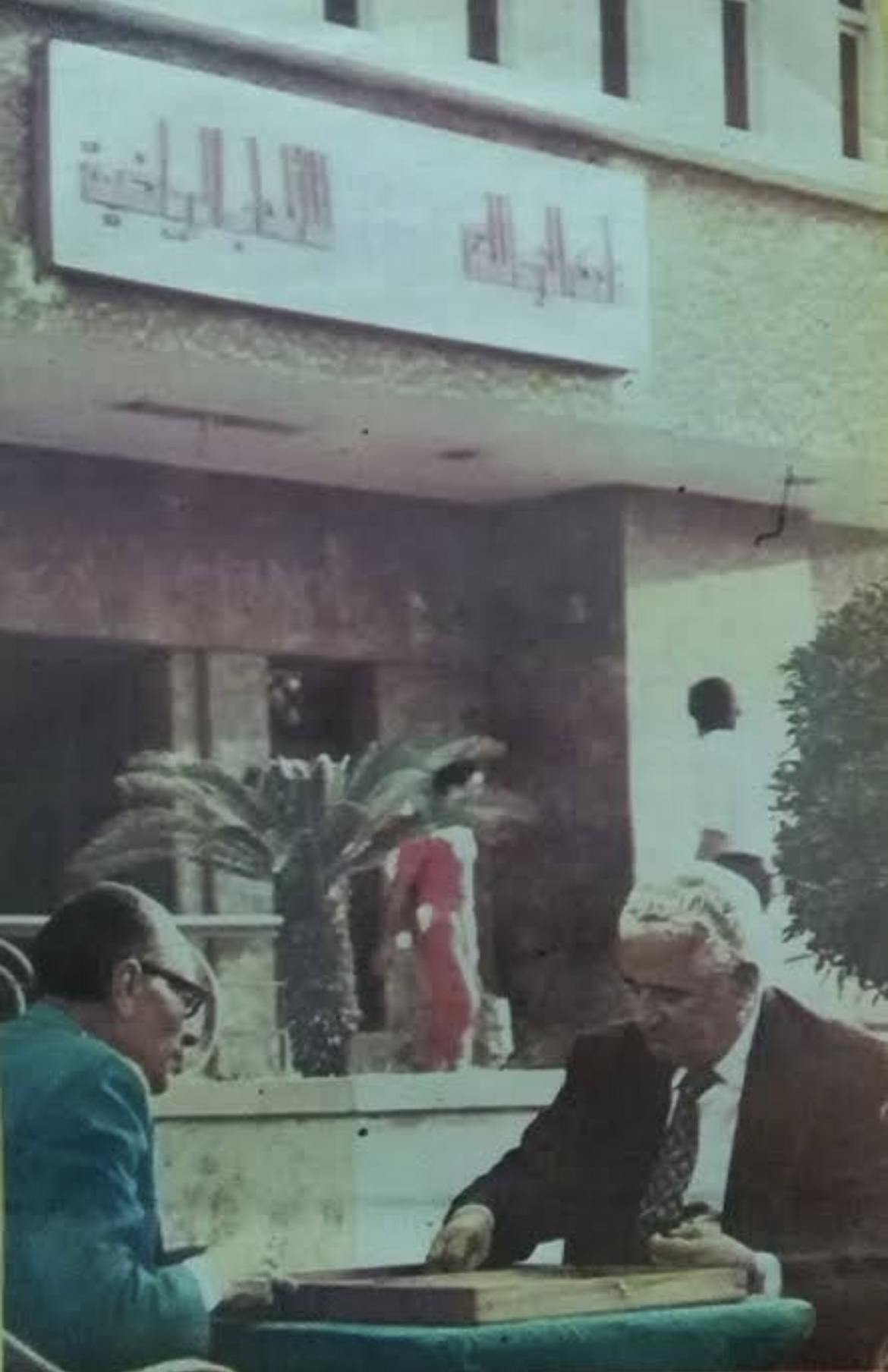
Helmy Zamora playing Backgammon with Egyptian President Anwar Sadat in Zamalek headquarters, 1979

Zamora held several administrative positions in the Egyptian Football Association, including his presidency of the competitions committee and the technical committee. In May 1978, he served as president of the Egyptian Football Association. He was the first football player to head a club in Egypt in 1967, and he remained president of Zamalek until August 1984, with the exception of only 1971, in which Counselor Tawfik El-Kheshen assumed the presidency of the club. Helmy had the first credit for establishing most of the Zamalek's facilities. He was famous for his volunteer work, as he did not receive any pay from Zamalek throughout his career in the club.

In 1980, Egyptian president Anwar Sadat issued a decision appointing Mohammed Hassan Helmy as a member of the Shura Council. Sadat wrote, "Mohamed Hassan Helmy is appointed to the Senate in recognition for his role, name, and agricultural and sporting history". It was in recognition for his long career, both in government and sports.

== Death ==
Helmy Zamora died on 5 November 1986 in Cairo. A week after his death, Zamalek's management decided to name the main stadium of Zamalek Club after him, and it was later named Abu Rajila Stadium in 2014, and renamed after him in 2023.

== Honours ==
Player

Zamalek

- Egypt Cup: (5)
  1934–35, 1937–38, 1940–41, 1942–43, 1943–44
- Cairo League: (5)
  1939–40, 1940–41, 1943–44, 1944–45, 1946–47
- King Fouad Cup: (1)
  1940–41

== See also ==
- Ahmed Helmy
