= Omar Shendi =

Egyptian footballer (1915–1992)

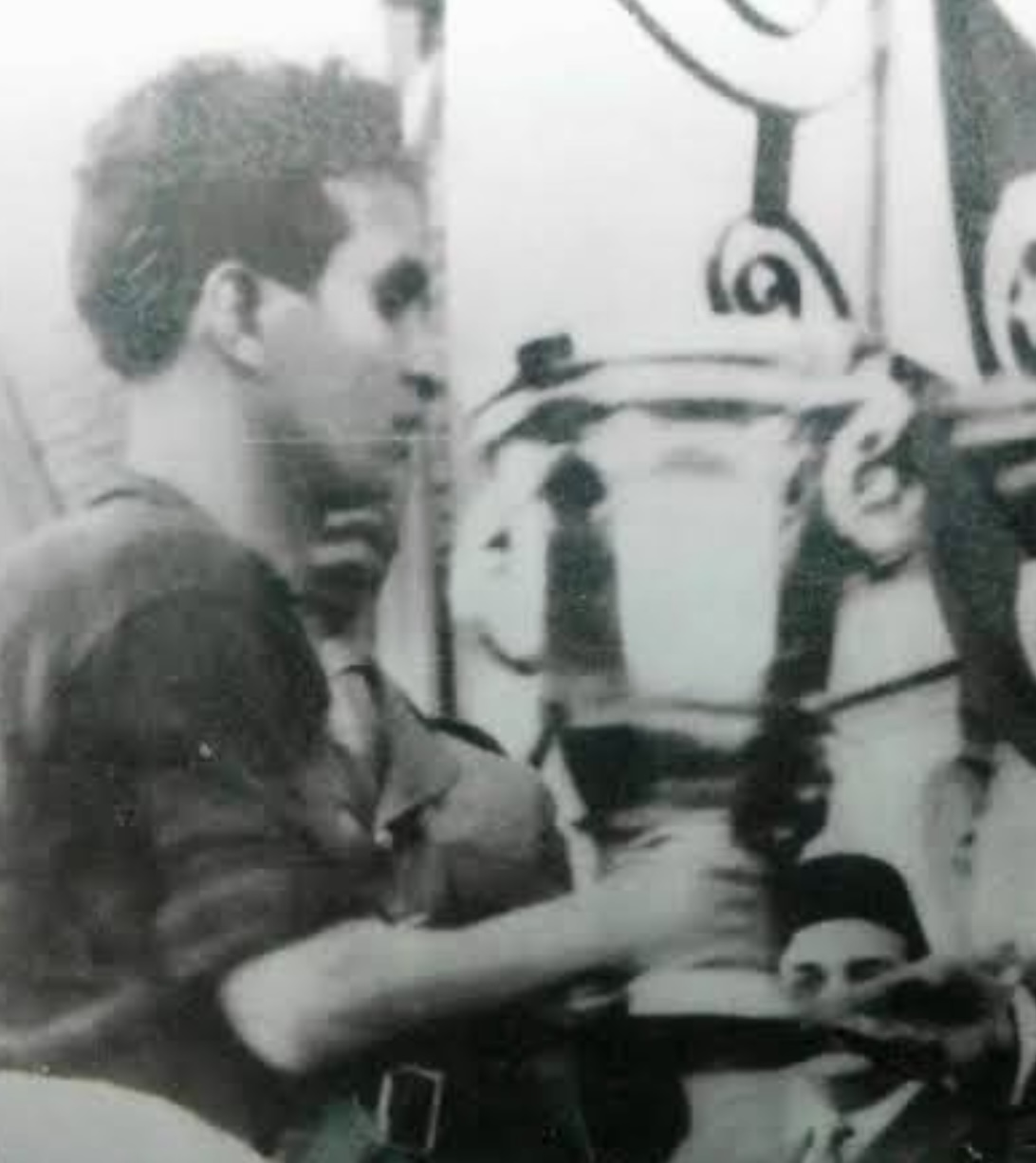
- Shendi with Zamalek in 1943

Personal information
- Date of birth: 1915
- Place of birth: Giza, Khedivate of Egypt
- Date of death: 23 April 1992 (aged 76–77)
- Place of death: Cairo, Egypt
- Position: Defender

Senior career*
Years	Team	Apps	(Gls)
1938–1949	Zamalek		

International career
- Egypt

Managerial career
- 1960: Al-Ittihad (Jeddah)
- 1963–1965: Qadsia
- * Club domestic league appearances and goals

Omar Shendi (Arabic: عمر شندي; 1915 – 23 April 1992) was an Egyptian footballer who played as a defender for Zamalek. He also played for the Egypt national team, and represented his country in the 1936 Summer Olympics.

== Biography ==
Omar Shendi played all of his career in Zamalek. He started his career in 1938 and played until 1949. He won with Zamalek the Egypt Cup for four times in (1937–38, 1940–41, 1942–43, 1943–44). He also won with his team seven titles of the Cairo League (the predecessor to the Egyptian Premier League) in (1939–40, 1940–41, 1943–44, 1944–45, 1945–46, 1946–47, 1948–49) and the King's Cup in (1941). Shendi scored once in the infamous 6-0 win for Zamalek over Al Ahly in the 1942 Cairo Derby, he also played in the infamous 6–0 win over Al Ahly in the 1944 Egypt Cup final. He retired from football in 1949.

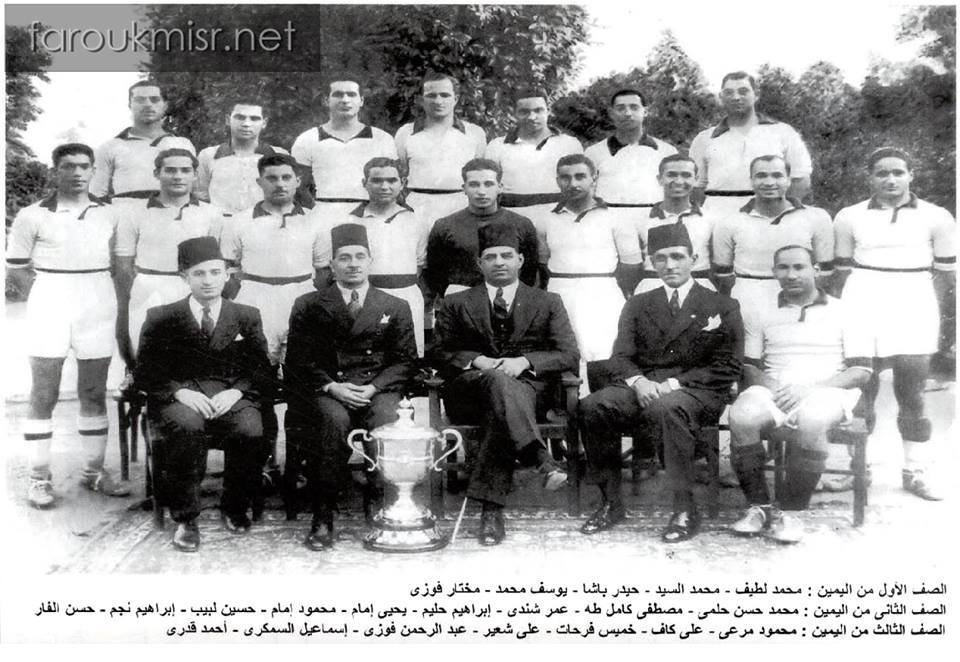
Shendi (third from right, front standing row) with Zamalek in 1939

Internationally, Shendi was called to represent Egypt at the 1936 Olympics in Berlin, but did not see any playing time, as the team was eliminated by Austria in the group stage.

Following his retirement from football, he worked as a football coach, primarily for Zamalek, working as a coach in the youth teams and as an assistant coach for the first team. He also had a stint as coach for Al-Ittihad of Jeddah in Saudi Pro League, in 1960. From 1963 to 1965 he managed Qadsia of Kuwait and won the Kuwait Emir Cup.

== Honours ==
=== Player ===
Zamalek

- Egypt Cup: 1937–38, 1940–41, 1942–43, 1943–44
- Cairo League: 1939–40, 1940–41, 1943–44, 1944–45, 1945–46, 1946–47, 1948–49
- King's Cup: 1941

=== Manager ===
Qadsia

- Kuwait Emir Cup: 1964–65
