= 1949–50 Cairo League =

1949–50 Cairo Zone League
Tournament details
- Country: Egypt

Final positions
- Champions: Al Ahly
- Runner-up: Tersana

1949–50 Cairo League, the 28th Cairo League competition, champion was decided by results of Cairo teams in national league with no separate matches for Cairo league competition, Al Ahly won the competition for 16th time.

== League table ==
Pos	Team	Pld	W	D	L	GF	GA	GD	Pts
1	Al Ahly (C)	6	3	2	1	9	5	+4	11
2	Tersana	6	3	1	2	8	9	−1	10
3	Zamalek	6	2	2	2	9	6	+3	8
4	El Sekka El Hadid	6	1	1	4	5	11	−6	4

Source: http://drtareksaid.net/CairoZone194950.html
(C) Champions

== See also ==
- 1949–50 Egyptian Premier League
