= 1955 Egypt Cup final =

- Event: 1954–55 Egypt Cup
Zamalek	Al Ittihad Alexandria
2	1
- Date: 1 July 1955

1955 Egypt Cup final, was the final match of the 1954–55 Egypt Cup, was between Zamalek and Al Ittihad Alexandria, Zamalek won the match 2–1.

== Route to the final ==
Zamalek		Round	Al Ittihad Alexandria
Opponent	Result	1954–55 Egypt Cup	Opponent	Result
Tanta	7–1	First Round		?
Ithad Suez	3–1	Quarterfinals		?
Ismaily	4–1	Semifinals		?

== Match details ==
1 July 1955

Zamalek	2 – 1	Al Ittihad Alexandria
El-Hamouly 47'; Baheeg 75'		Adam 45'

El-Mokhtalat:
GK	?	(Egypt) Ali Bakr
?	?	(Egypt) Mohamed Bekhit
?	?	(Egypt) Hanafy Bastan
?	?	(Egypt) Nour El-Dali
?	?	(Egypt) Soliman Daoud
?	?	(Egypt) Ali Sharaf
?	?	(Egypt) Essam Baheeg
?	?	(Egypt) Khalil Said Quadry
?	?	(Egypt) Helal Moussa Quadry
?	?	(Egypt) Alaa El-Hamouly
?	?	(Egypt) Sharif El-Far
Manager:
Abdulrahman Fawzi

Al Ittihad Alexandria:
GK	?	(Egypt) Ahmed Kato
?	?	(Egypt) Habashi Selim
?	?	(Egypt) Raafat Attia
?	?	(Egypt) Ahmed Belal
?	?	(Egypt) Hassan Ali
?	?	(Egypt) Saad Rashed
?	?	(Egypt) Amin Ibrahim
?	?	(Egypt) El-Morshedi
?	?	(Egypt) Mohamed Diab El-Attar "Diba"
?	?	(Egypt) Refaei Sorour
?	?	(Egypt) Hassan Adam
Manager:
