= 1941–42 Cairo League =

1941–42 Cairo Zone League
Tournament details
- Country: Egypt

Final positions
- Champions: Al Ahly
- Runners-up: Zamalek

1941–42 Cairo League, the 21st Cairo League competition, Ahly won the competition for the 12th time.

== League table ==
Pos	Club	Pld	W	D	L	F	A	±	Pts
1	Al Ahly (C)	10	7	2	1	26	16	10	16
2	Zamalek	10	7	0	3	36	11	25	14
3	Al-Sekka Al-Hadid	10	5	2	3	29	14	15	12
4	Tersana	9	4	1	4	13	16	-3	9
5	Nugello Club	8	2	1	5	11	25	-14	5
6	Nubian Club Cairo	9	0	0	9	4	37	-33	0

(C)= Champions, Pld = Matches played; W = Matches won; D = Matches drawn; L = Matches lost; F = Goals for; A = Goals against; ± = Goal difference; Pts = Points
Source: .

== Matches ==
7 November 1941 1	Zamalek	1 – 2	Sekka

9 November 1941 1	Tersana	3 – 2	Nubian Club Cairo

14 November 1941 1	Police	1 – 3	Al-Ahly

21 November 1941 2	Zamalek	3 – 0	Tersana
	Sakr 15', 49'; Nasr 58'

21 November 1941 2	Al-Ahly	4 – 1	Nubian Club Cairo

28 November 1941 2	Sekka	1 – 2	Police
			El-Menshawi (?); Hamido Gaber (?)

5 December 1941 3	Al-Ahly	5 – 2	Tersana

7 December 1941 3	Nubian Club Cairo	1 – 6	Sekka

12 December 1941 3	Police	0 – 6	Zamalek

19 December 1941 4	Sekka	2 – 2	Al-Ahly

21 December 1941 4	Zamalek	3 – 0	Nubian Club Cairo

26 December 1941 4	Tersana	1 – 0	Police

2 January 1942 5	Zamalek	6 – 0	Al-Ahly	Zamalek Stadium
15:00	Fawzi (?); Sakr (?); Shendi (?); Helmy (?)	Report

4 January 1942 5	Nubian Club Cairo	0 – 3	Police

10 January 1942 5	Sekka	1 – 1	Tersana

18 January 1942 6	Nubian Club Cairo	0 – 2	Tersana

23 January 1942 6	Al-Ahly	3 – 3	Police

30 January 1942 6	Tersana	1 – 2	Zamalek

1 February 1942 7	Nubian Club Cairo	0 – 3	Al-Ahly
