= 1957 Egypt Cup final =

- Event: 1956–57 Egypt Cup
Zamalek	Al-Masry
3	0
- Date: 31 May 1957

1957 Egypt Cup final, was the final match of the 1956–57 Egypt Cup, was between Zamalek and Al-Masry, Zamalek won the match 3–0.

== Route to the final ==
Zamalek		Round	Al-Masry
Opponent	Result	1956–57 Egypt Cup	Opponent	Result
Vertos	3–1	First Round		?
Ithad	1–0	Quarterfinals		?
Sekka	2–0	Semifinals		?

== Match details ==
31 May 1957

Zamalek	3 – 0	Al-Masry
Ezzat 17', 62', 85'

Zamalek:
GK	?	(Egypt) Ali Bakr
?	?	(Egypt) Yakan Hussein
?	?	(Egypt) Nour El-Dali
?	?	(Egypt) Helal Moussa Quadry
?	?	(Egypt) Hamada El-Sharkawy
?	?	(Egypt) Alaa El-Hamouly
?	?	(Egypt) Maged Morsi
?	?	(Egypt) Essam Baheeg
?	?	(Egypt) Mamdouh Eassa
?	?	(Egypt) Zamer Ezzat
?	?	(Egypt) Sherif El-Far
Manager:

Al-Masry:
GK	?	(Italy) Aldo Stella
?	?	(Egypt) Abdel Ghani Belal
?	?	(Egypt) El-Lewi
?	?	(Egypt) Fathi Ahmed
?	?	(Egypt) El-Sayed Ali
?	?	(Egypt) Sayed El-Tabei
?	?	(Egypt) Mohamed Abdel Aziz
?	?	(Egypt) Adel El-Gazzar
?	?	(Egypt) Abdou Selim
?	?	(Egypt) Mohamed Mansour
?	?	(Egypt) Bibo
Manager:
