= 1941 Egypt Cup final =

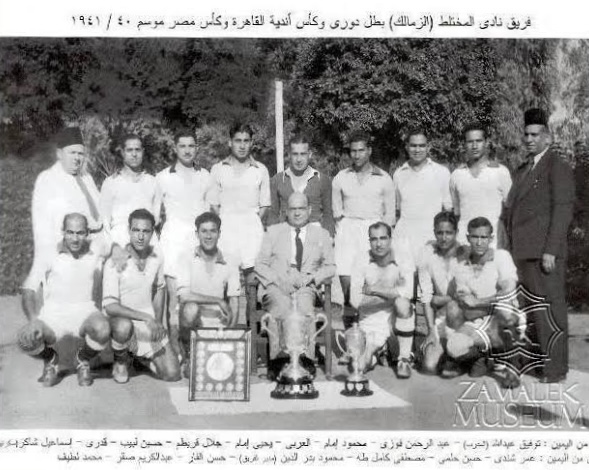
- Zamalek SC, winners of the 1941 Egypt Cup
- Event: 1940–41 Egypt Cup
Zamalek	Cairo Police
5	0
- Date: 23 May 1941

1941 Egypt Cup final, was the final match of 1940–41 Egypt Cup, when Zamalek (El-Mokhtalat) defeated Cairo Police by a score of 5–0, Zamalek claimed the cup for the 5th time.

== Route to the final ==
Zamalek		Round	Cairo Police
Opponent	Result	1940–41 Egypt Cup	Opponent	Result
Tersana	0–0, 3–0 (Replay)	First Round
Al-Sekka Al-Hadid	4–0	Quarterfinals
Teram	5–1	Semifinals	Ahly	2–1

== Game description ==
=== Match details ===
23 May 1941

Zamalek	5–0	Cairo Police
Fawzi ?' (pen.); Sakr ?', ?', ?'; Helmy ?'	Report

Zamalek:
GK	(Egypt) Yehia Emam
RB	(Egypt) Said El-Arabi
CB	(Egypt) Mostafa Taha
CB	(Egypt) Hassan El-Far
LB	(Egypt) Omar Shendi
CM	(Egypt) Quadry Moustafa
CM	(Egypt) Abdulrahman Fawzi
RW	(Egypt) Abdel-Karim Sakr
AM	(Egypt) Mahmoud Emam
LW	(Egypt) Mohammed Hassan Helmy
CF	(Egypt) Mohamed Latif
Manager:
Tewfik Abdullah

Cairo Police:
GK	(Egypt) Abdel Aziz
RB	(Egypt) Nazmi
CB	(Egypt) Ali El-Eskandarani
CB	(Egypt) Ahmed Abdel Hamid
LB	(Egypt) Amin Sabry
CM	(Egypt) Zozo
CM	(Egypt) Nasr
RW	(Egypt) Abougreisha
CM	(Egypt) Ramzy Barsoum
FW	(Egypt) Mahmoud El-Nigero
FW	(Egypt) Safrouta
Manager:
