= Mohamed El-Guindi =

Egyptian footballer (1920–1995)

Personal information
- Full name: Mohamed El-Din El-Guindi
- Date of birth: 1920
- Place of birth: Khartoum, Sudan
- Date of death: 13 November 1995 (aged 74–75)
- Place of death: Cairo, Egypt

International career
| Years | Team | Apps | (Gls) |
- Egypt

Managerial career
- Al Ahly
Medal record
Men's football
Representing United Arab Republic (as manager)
Africa Cup of Nations
| Runner-up | 1962 Ethiopia |

Mohamed El-Din El-Guindi (Arabic: مُحَمَّد الدِّين الْجُنْدِيّ; 1920 – 13 November 1995) was an Egyptian footballer who played for the national team. He competed for Egypt in the men's tournament at the 1948 Summer Olympics.

== Honours ==
=== Manager ===
United Arab Republic

- African Cup of Nations: runner-up, 1962
