= 1944 Egypt Cup final =

- Event: 1943–44 Egypt Cup
Zamalek	Al-Ahly
6	0
- Date: 2 June 1944
- Venue: Ittihad El-Gaish Stadium
- Referee: Ismail Kaseb

1944 Egypt Cup final, was the final match of 1943–44 Egypt Cup, when Zamalek (Farouk) defeated Al-Ahly by a score of 6–0, the largest winning margin in the derby and Egypt cup finals, Zamalek claimed the cup for the 7th time.

== Route to the final ==
Zamalek		Round	Al-Ahly
Opponent	Result	1943–44 Egypt Cup	Opponent	Result
Ithad Suez	3–0	First Round	Tanta	3–0
El-Olympi	3–1	Quarterfinals	Canal Police	1–0
Al-Masry	(W.O.)^{1}	Semifinals	Al-Sekka Al-Hadid	4–0

^{1} Masry withdrew protesting to play in Cairo.

== Game description ==
=== Match details ===
2 June 1944
17:00

Al Zamalek	6–0	Al Ahly
Zoklot ?', ?', ?'; El-Sehaimi ?', ?'; Sakr ?'	Report

Ittihad El-Gaish Stadium
Referee: Ismail Kaseb

Zamalek	Al-Ahly

Zamalek:
GK	(Egypt) Yehia Emam
RB	(Egypt) Said El-Arabi
CB	(Egypt) Galal Keraitam
CB	(Egypt) Hanafy Bastan
LB	(Egypt) Anwar El-Bashbishi
CM	(Egypt) Abdel Rehim Shendi
CM	(Egypt) Omar Shendi
RW	(Egypt) Zoklot
AM	(Egypt) Mostafa Taha
LW	(Egypt) Abdel-Karim Sakr
CF	(Egypt) Mohsen El-Sehaimi
Manager: Tewfik Abdullah

Ahly:
GK	(Egypt) Kamal Hamed
RB	(Egypt) Kamel Ateya
CB	(Egypt) Wadeea
CB	(Egypt) Mahmoud El-Mehailmi
LB	(Egypt) Hamdi Karawan
CM	(Egypt) Mohamed El-Guindi
CM	(Egypt) Mounir Hafez
RW	(Egypt) Saleh El-Sawwaf
FW	(Egypt) Moustafa Elwani (El-Kassar)
LW	(Egypt) Ahmed Mekkawi
CF	(Egypt) Hussein Madkour
Manager:

== See also ==
- 1942 Cairo Derby
