= 1934–35 Egypt Cup =

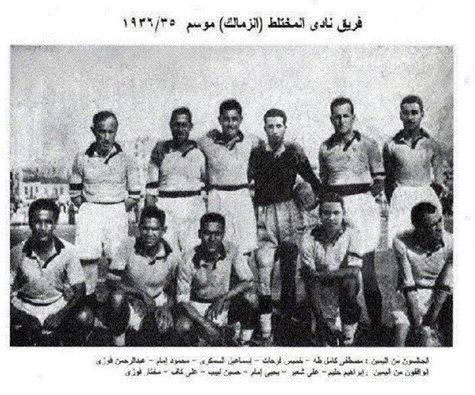
- Zamalek's starting lineup in 1935

Tournament details
- Country: Egypt

Final positions
- Champions: Zamalek (3rd title)
- Runners-up: Al Ahly

The 1933–34 Egypt Cup was the 14th edition of the Egypt Cup.

The final was held on 10 May 1935. The match was contested by Zamalek and Al Ahly, with Zamalek winning 3–0.

== Quarter-finals ==
Team 1	Score	Team 2
Zamalek	2–1	Cairo Police
Olympic Club	0–3	Al Ittihad Alexandria
Al Masry	1–0	El Sekka El Hadid
Al Ahly	2–0	Tersana

== Semi-finals ==
Team 1	Score	Team 2
Al Ahly	5–2	Al Masry
Zamalek	3–1	Al Ittihad Alexandria

== Final ==
10 May 1935

Zamalek	3–0	Al Ahly
Helmy Zamora ?'; El-Samkary ?'; Marei ?'	Report

Referee: (Wales)

Egypt Cup 1934-1935 Winners
Zamalek
3rd title
