= 1948–49 Cairo League =

1948–49 Cairo Zone League
Tournament details
- Country: Egypt

Final positions
- Champions: Zamalek (Farouk Club)
- Runners-up: Al Ahly

1948–49 Cairo League, the 27th Cairo League competition, champion was decided by results of Cairo teams in national league with no separate matches for Cairo league competition, Zamalek (Farouk Club) won the competition for 12th time.

== League table ==
Pos	Team	Pld	W	D	L	GF	GA	GD	Pts
1	Zamalek (C)	6	4	1	1	14	5	+9	9
2	Al Ahly	6	2	3	1	16	8	+8	7
3	Tersana	6	2	2	2	7	8	−1	6
4	Al-Sekka Al-Hadid	6	1	0	5	3	19	−16	2

Updated to match(es) played on unknown. Source:
(C) Champions

== Matches ==
3 December 1948 League week 7	Tersana	2 – 2	Al-Ahly

10 December 1948 League week 8	Al-Ahly	2 – 2	Zamalek
	Mekawi ?'; Osman ?'		Rostum ?'; Sakr ?'

12 December 1948 League week 8	Sekka	1 – 0	Tersana

18 December 1948 League week 9	Al-Ahly	7 – 0	Sekka

7 January 1949 League week 10	Sekka	0 – 2	Zamalek

14 January 1949 League week 11	Zamalek	3 – 0	Tersana
	Sakr 15', 49'; Nasr 58'

13 March 1949 League week 19	Al-Ahly	1 – 1	Tersana

1 April 1949 League week 19	Zamalek	1 – 0	Al-Ahly
	Marei ?'

3 April 1949 League week 19	Tersana	1 – 0	Sekka

10 April 1949 League week 20	Sekka	2 – 4	Al-Ahly

17 April 1949 League week 21	Zamalek	5 – 0	Sekka

3 June 1949 League week 22	Tersana	3 – 1	Zamalek
			Mannas ?'

== See also ==
- 1948–49 Egyptian Premier League
