= Cairo League =

Defunct football league in Egypt

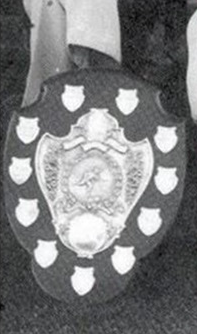
- Organising body: Egyptian Football Association
- Founded: 1922
- Folded: 1958
- Country: Egypt
- Number of clubs: 8
- Level on pyramid: 1
- Domestic cup: Egypt Cup
- Last champions: Al Ahly (1957–58)
- Most championships: Al Ahly (15 titles)

The Cairo League was an Official Egyptian football tournament. Before the start of Egyptian Premier League in its current form, the main competition was the Egypt Cup which started in 1922. The first season was played in 1922–23 and was won by Zamalek.

== History ==
Egyptian Football Association started its 1st league competition (1922) in the form of regional leagues (Cairo, Alexandria, Bahary and Canal). The competition was played along with the new league form (1948–1954) then finally stopped.

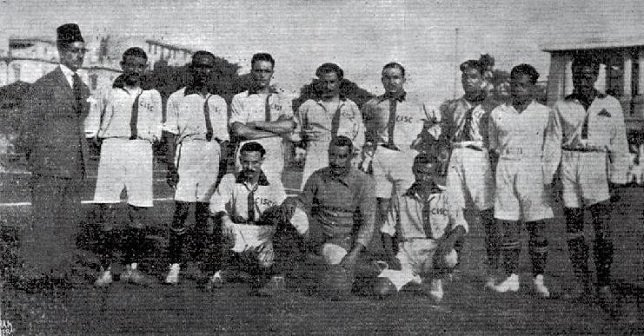
Zamalek squad, the winners of the first Cairo League in 1922-23 season.

Over six teams participated in this league Zamalek, Al Ahly, Sekka, Tersana, Police, the Greek Club and others. The Championship was then held once more in (1957–58) but was then stopped again.

== Honours ==
List of the winners:

Season	Winner
1922–23	Zamalek
1923–24	Sekka
1924–25	Al Ahly
1925–26	Sekka
1926–27	Al Ahly
1927–28	Al Ahly
1928–29	Zamalek
1929–30	Zamalek
1930–31	Al Ahly
1931–32	Zamalek
1932–33	Tersana
1933–34	Zamalek
1934–35	Al Ahly
1935–36	Al Ahly
1936–37	Al Ahly
1937–38	Al Ahly
1938–39	Al Ahly
1939–40	Zamalek
1940–41	Zamalek
1941–42	Al Ahly
1942–43	Al Ahly
1943–44	Zamalek
1944–45	Zamalek
1945–46	Al Ahly
1946–47	Zamalek
1947–48	Al Ahly
1948–49	Zamalek
1949–50	Al Ahly
1950–51	Zamalek
1951–52	Zamalek
1952–53	Zamalek
1954–1957	Not played
1957–58	Al Ahly

== Performances ==
Team	Titles
Al Ahly	15
Zamalek	14
Sekka	2
Tersana	1
