= King's Cup (Egypt) =

Defunct Association football competition in Egypt

- Organiser(s): Egyptian Football Association
- Founded: 1925
- Abolished: 1952
- Region: Egypt
- Domestic cup: Egypt Cup
- Most championships: Zamalek (3 titles)

King's Cup or King Fouad Cup is a previous Egyptian football competition. It was founded in the 1924–25 season.

It was held between teams from different regions, which were chosen from clubs from different regions competing for the King Fouad Cup. Its name was changed in 1942 to the King Fouad Cup after the name of the Prince Farouk Cup was changed to the King's Cup, which eventually became the Egypt Cup while the King Fouad Cup was discontinued in 1952.

== Regions ==
- Cairo region: 19 titles
- Alexandria area: 6 titles
- Canal Zone: 3 titles

== Winning Seasons ==
- 1924–25: Cairo region
- 1925–26: Cairo region
- 1926–27: Alexandria area
- 1927–28: Cairo region
- 1928–29: Cairo region
- 1929–30: Alexandria area
- 1930–31: Cairo region
- 1931–32: Cairo region
- 1932–33: Alexandria area
- 1933–34: Cairo region
- 1934–35: Canal zone
- 1935–36: Canal zone
- 1936–37: Alexandria area
- 1937–38: Canal zone
- 1938–39: Alexandria area
- 1939–40: Cairo region
- 1940–41: Cairo region
- 1941–42: Cairo region
- 1942–43: Cairo region
- 1943–44: Alexandria area
- 1944–45: Cairo region
- 1945–46: Cairo region
- 1946–47: Cairo region
- 1947–48: Cairo region
- 1948–49: Cairo region
- 1949–50: Cairo region
- 1950–51: Cairo region
- 1951–52: Cairo region

== See also ==
- Sultan Hussein Cup
- El Zamalek
- Al Ahly
- Al Ittihad
- Egyptian Football
