= 1943 Egypt Cup final =

- Event: 1942–43 Egypt Cup
| Zamalek | Al-Ahly |
| - | - |
- Canceled, title shared

The 1943 Egypt Cup final was the planned final match of the 1942–43 King Farouk Cup, scheduled to take place between Zamalek SC (Farouk) and Al Ahly SC. The match was canceled due to the suspension of players from both clubs after they toured in Palestine against the Egyptian Football Association decision.

The suspension was lifted on 19 April 1944, allowing the start of the 1943–44 Egypt Cup competition. This resulted in the 1943 title being shared between the two clubs, for the first and only time in the competition's history.

== Route to the final ==
| Zamalek | | Round | Al-Ahly |
|---|---|---|---|---|
| Opponent | Result | 1942–43 Egypt Cup | Opponent | Result |
| Beni Suef Prince Farouk's Club | 4–2 | First Round |
| Ithad Suez | 4–0 | Quarterfinals | Port Said police | 2–0 |
| Port Foad | 3–1 | Semifinals | Ittihad Alexandria | 3–0 |
