= 1920–21 El Mokhtalat Club season =

Al-Mokhtalat
1920–21 season
- Chairman: Mohamed Heidar Basha
- Sultan Cup: Winner

The 1920–21 season was Al-Mokhtalat SC's 10th season of football, The club won the 1920–21 Sultan Hussein Cup.

== Squad ==
Nationality	Name	Age
Goalkeepers
(Egypt)	Mahmoud Marei	?
Defenders
(Egypt)	Foad Gamil	?
(Egypt)	Youssef Wahbi	?
(Egypt)	Mohamed Gabr	?
(Egypt)	Ali El-Hassani	?
Midfielders
(Egypt)	Abdel Salam Hamdi	?
(Egypt)	Gamil Osman	?
(Egypt)	El-Sayed Abaza	?
Forwards
(Egypt)	Hussein Hegazi	?
(Egypt)	Ali Reyadh	?
(Egypt)	Ahmed Kholousi	?

== 1920–21 Sultan Cup ==
7 May 1921 Final	El-Mokhtalat (Egypt)	2–1 (a.e.t.)	(United Kingdom) Schroeders
				Referee: Yossef Mohammed
