= 1921–22 El Mokhtalat Club season =

Al-Mokhtalat
1921–22 season
- Chairman: Mohamed Heidar Basha
- Egypt Cup: Winner
- Sultan Cup: Winner

The 1921–22 season was Al-Mokhtalat SC's 11th season of football. The club won 1921–22 Egyptian Cup, 1921–22 Sultan Hussein Cup.

== 1922 Egypt Cup ==
3 March 1922 Round of 16	Al-Mokhtalat	4–0	Tersana SC
	El-Sayed Abaza ?', ?'; Youssef Mohamed ?'; Ali Reyadh ?'

13 March 1922 Quarterfinals	Al-Mokhtalat	3–0	Government Employee Club
	El-Sayed Abaza (3)

31 March 1922 SemiFinals	Al-Mokhtalat	3–0	Schools Team
	Youssef Mohamed; Ali Reyadh; Mohamed Gabr

April 1922 Final	Al-Mokhtalat	5–0	Itthad
	Osman ?'; Abaza ?'; Hegazi ?'; Reyadh ?', ?'

== 1922 Sultan Cup ==
1922 Final	Al-Mokhtalat (Egypt)	3–1	(United Kingdom) Sherwoods
