= History of Zamalek SC =

Egyptian sports club

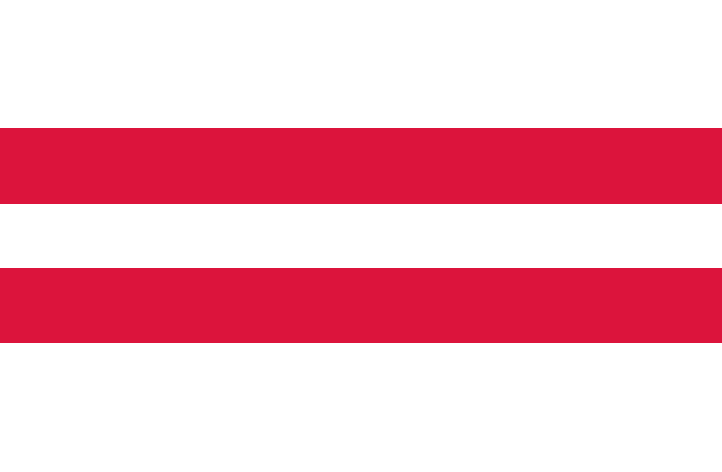
Zamalek SC colors

Zamalek SC, commonly referred to as Zamalek, is an Egyptian sports club based in Cairo, known for its professional football team, and is considered as one of the most successful teams in Africa and one of the continent's giants. The history of Zamalek SC originates in 1911, when the club was founded by George Merzbach on January 5 as the Cairo International Sports Club "Zamalek", colloquially known as Nady El Qāhirah El Mokhtalat.

In 1913 the club moved its headquarters to the present-day intersection of 26 July Street and Ramses. The club was granted the honorific title in 1941 after King Farouk and became officially known as Farouk El Awal Club (transl. Farouk I Club), however, since the 1910s, Zamalek was the club's unofficial name and it became official after the 1952 Egyptian revolution.

== Early years (1911–1915) ==
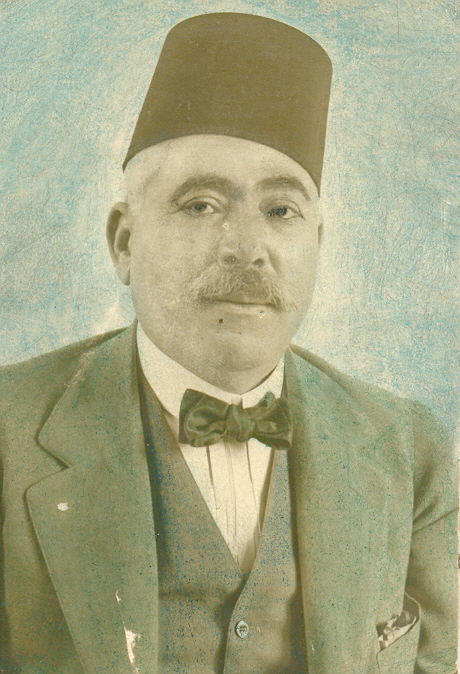
Ahmed Zaki Pasha, Secretary of the Egyptian Cabinet and Zamalek's first Egyptian board member.

Little is known about the very early years of the club. According to historians, the club was established by Belgian lawyer George Merzbach. On December 25, 1910, while attending Cairo Tramways Company's Christmas celebration, Merzbach realized that the company's guest house hosting the celebration on the Nile banks — then the Qasr El Nile casino — would be suitable as a sports club headquarters.

During this time, Cairo's main sporting club, Gezira Sporting Club, was for the exclusive use of the British Army; subsequently, Merzbach decided to establish a new club for Egyptian, Belgian and foreign citizens. He did not find difficulties in establishing the club due to his strong ties within the Palace of Khedive Abbas II, as well as many friendships with senior officials of Egyptian society. He was also the private lawyer for Baron Empain and his Cairo Tramways Company. For the new club, he chose the name Qasr El Nile, which means Nile Palace. On January 5, 1911, the club was established, and it was officially opened on February 6 with Marzbech as its president.

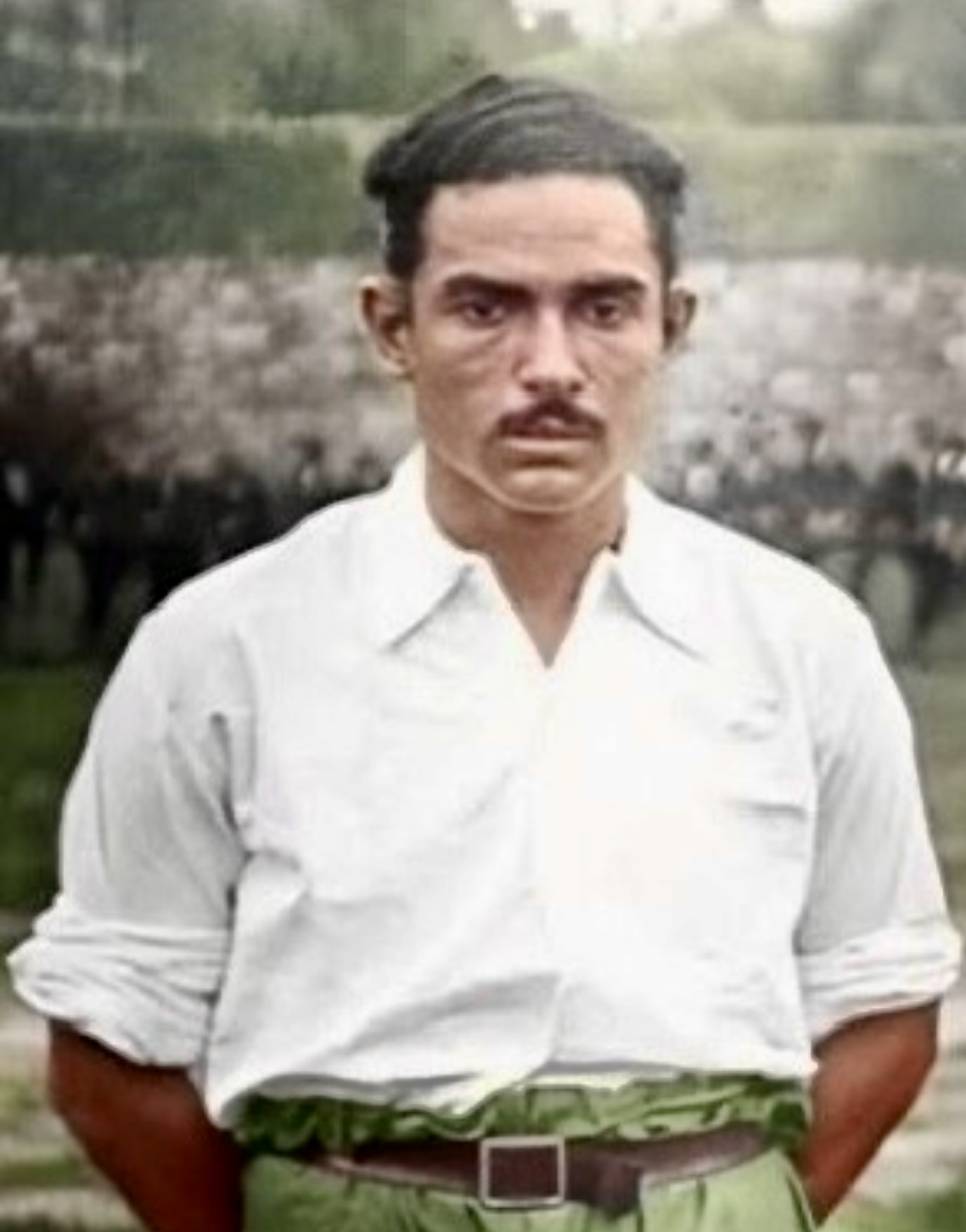
Zamalek's forward Tewfik Abdullah, led the team as a player and coach.

Howard Carter, an archaeologist and Merzbach's personal friend, served as vice president. Noah Amin Abdullah, Ahmed Mahmoud Azzam, Khoury Chalhoub (representative of the Cairo Tramways Company), and Paolo Esposito (representative of the Khedivial Palace) formed the rest of the board of directors. It was the first club in Cairo to emerge from non-English expatriate communities. An essential aspect of the club was that it was for all people and not exclusive to any specific social, economic, or ethnic community. It started and continued through World War I under Merzbech's presidency.

In 1913, the club moved to a second headquarters at present-day intersection of the 26 July and Ramses streets and changed its name to Cairo International Sports Club (C.I.S.C.), which was colloquially translated to the Arabic name Nady El Qāhirah El Mokhtalat or simply Nady El Mokhtalat. The second president was Nicola Arfagi, who also played left wing for the club's football team.

The Aegytische Nachrichten newspaper reported in its issue of December 11, 1912 that the Cairo International Sports Club issued its first weekly newspaper under the name Cairo Sports on Saturday, December 11, 1912. The news was concerned with the Ministry of Labor's approval to allow the club to work on adding signs on all the Cairo-Alexandria Road. The ministry only wanted a preliminary sample. Zamalek (C.I.S.C) participated in the International Union's championships(El Mokhtalat union's), and Le phare d'Alexandria newspaper reported that they won the second edition of the Bolanchi Challenge Cup on December 28, 1913, after defeating the Greek team (who won the Alexandria qualifiers) by a score of 6–0. The match was played at the Zamalek's stadium in Bulaq. Zamalek's starting lineup included; Tawfik Abdullah, Soufi, Saeed, Williams, Gamal, Songhurst, Khorazati, Lyon, Southon, and Arangi. The match started at 3:07 p.m., Lyon scored the first goal in the ninth minute, and Khorazati scored the second goal in the 28th minute, and Khorazati scored two goals in the second half. Before reaching the final match, Zamalek played at home with the Italian Brotherhood team on November 23, 1913, and played with the same team on November 30, 1913.

== Egyptianization, unprecedented success (1915–1941) ==
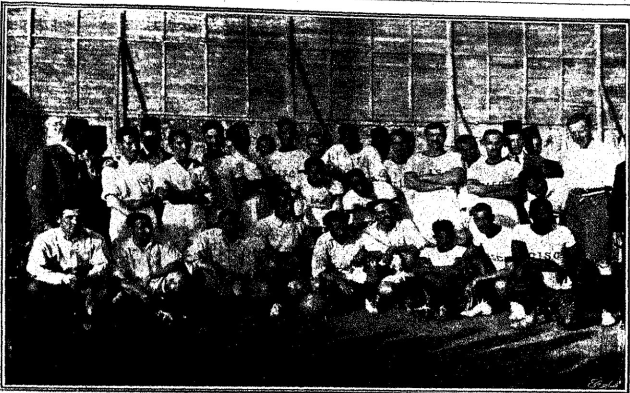
C.I.S.C. football squad in 1917

In 1915, Ibrahim Allam "Juhainah" moved to the club with his football team, coming from El Sekka El Hadid SC. Zamalek was the first Egyptian team to play against foreign teams. In 1916, they defeated the Scottish Horse by a score of 1–0. Zamalek's team in the 1910s included Tewfik Abdullah, Gamil Osman, Fouad Gamil, Ali El-Hassani, Abdel Salam Hamdy and Ahmed Kholousi.

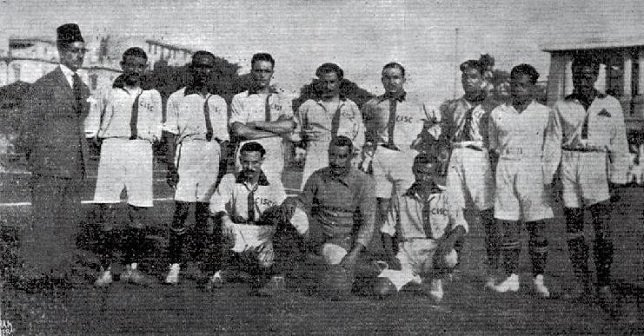
C.I.S.C. football squad, champions of the Sultan Hussein Cup in 1921

The Sultan Hussein Cup started in 1917 as a competition between Egyptian football clubs and clubs of the Allied armies, including the British. Al Ahly SC — Cairo's other premier sports club — initially refused to take part, leaving C.I.S.C. as the only Egyptian team who participated as a sign of resistance to the British rule. In 1917. Zamalek played great matches and reached the final match against the English GHQ Signals team, the first champion of the competition. The championship was managed by the Egyptian Ibrahim Allam and was organized under the auspices of the Sultan of Egypt Hussein Kamel.

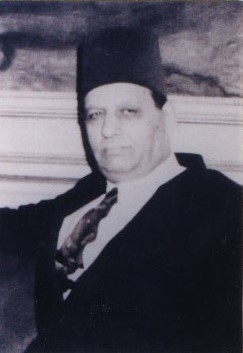
Mohammed Haidar Pasha, Zamalek's 4th and longest serving president

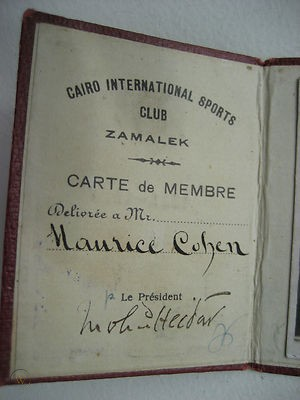
C.I.S.C. "Zamalek" membership card, 1928

After Zamalek's historic first season, many Egyptian clubs announced their desire to participate in the competition as they found it serious, official, bearing the name of the country's sultan, and includes a trophy for the winning team. The two premier clubs of Cairo played two games in this year. The first took place on February 9, 1917, where Al-Ahly defeated home-team C.I.S.C. 1–0; the second took place on March 2, 1917, where the visiting C.I.S.C. won 1–0, and this was the start of the Cairo derby.

The club came under severe scrutiny in the same year, board of directors of zamalek raised the twelve issues included that the club's land lease was expired; that the board of directors had not met for a long time, and consisted solely of non-Egyptians; and that there were no lists of members of the club. A general assembly was convened, which issued a decision of non-confidence in the board of directors. Consequently, the board was replaced by Egyptian citizens, including Dr. Mohamed Badr as president, Ibrahim Allam as treasurer, Mustafa Hassan, Fawzi, Captain Hassan and Abdo Al-Jabbawi.

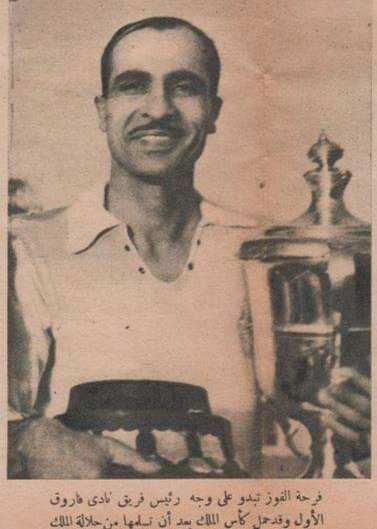
Zamalek's striker Mostafa Taha

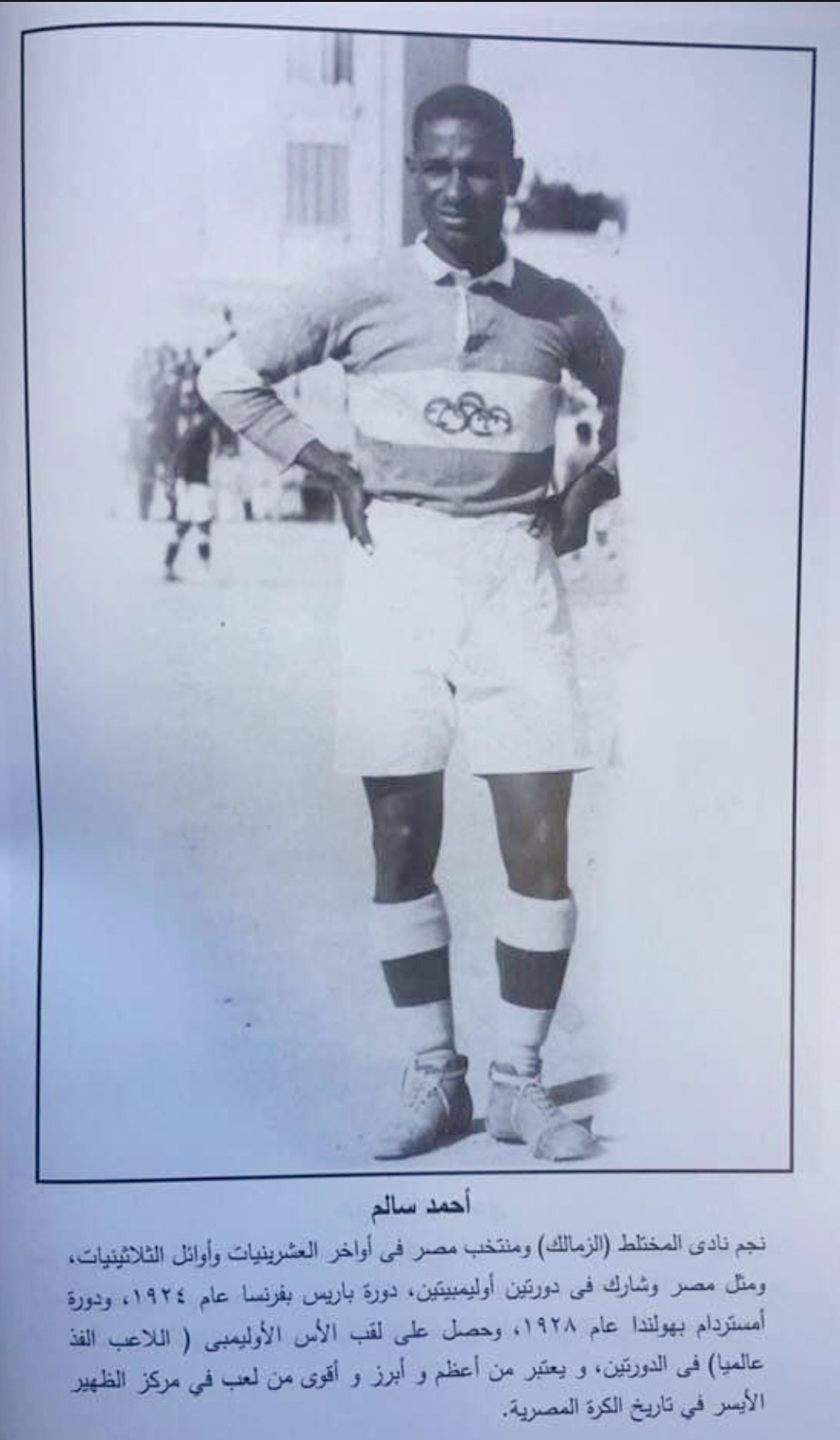
Zamalek's back left Ahmed Salem

In the early 1920s, C.I.S.C. became the strongest football team and the main major force in Egyptian football. In 1921, C.I.S.C. won the Sultan Hussein Cup, becoming the first Egyptian team to ever win a title. In 1922, the club won the inaugural season of the Egypt Cup (in a 2–1 victory over Britain's Schroeders), and the first Cairo League winners in 1923, followed by victories in the 1932, 1935 and 1938 seasons. The club also won the Cairo League in 1930 and 1932.

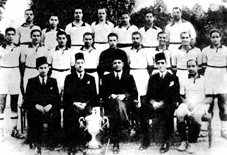
C.I.S.C. (Zamalek SC); winners of the Egypt Cup in the 1938–39 season

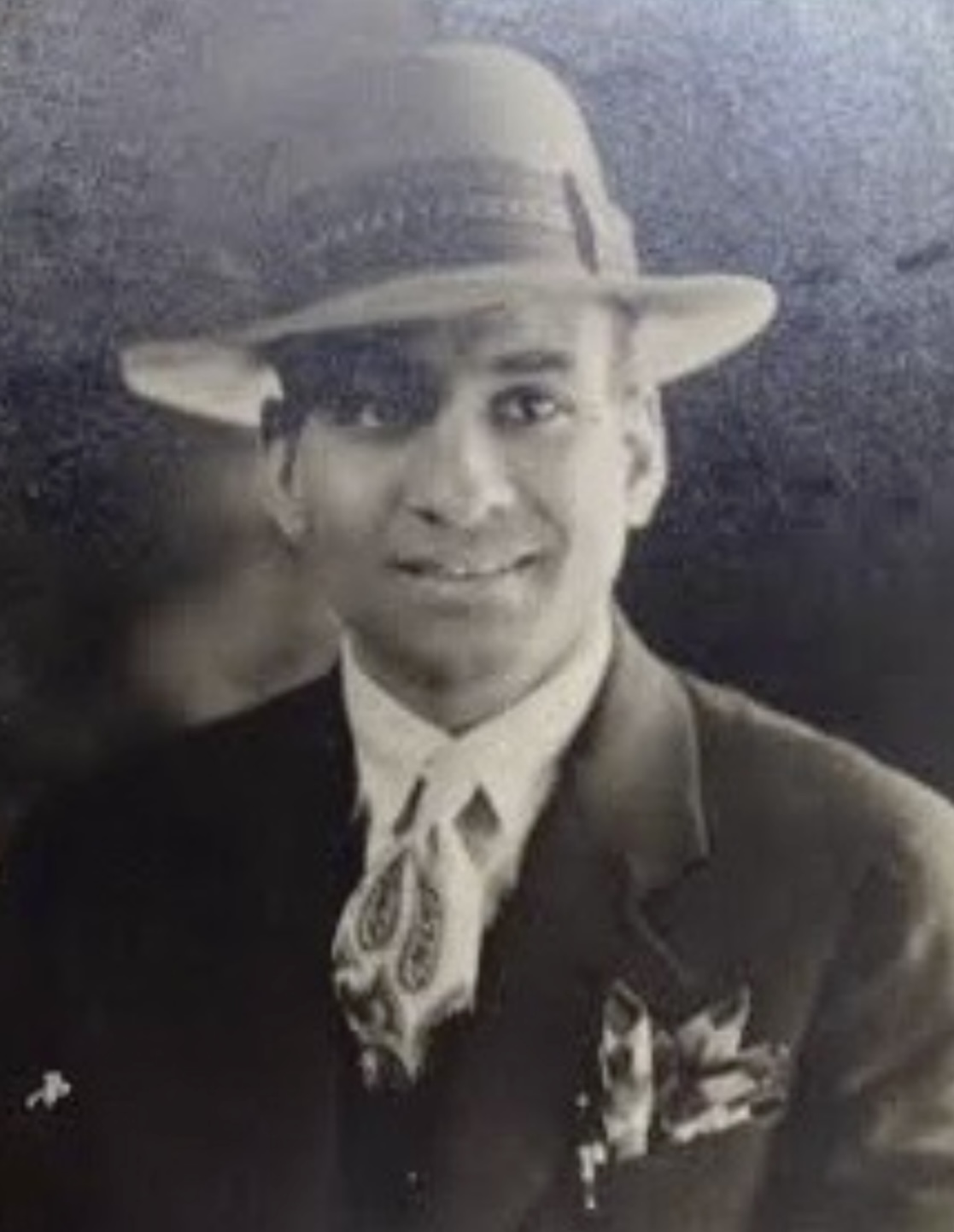
Tewfik Abdullah, former player and first known manager of Zamalek SC, and the most decorated manager in the history of the club with 9 trophies.

A new board was formed in 1923 with Lieutenant General Mohammed Haidar as president and Youssef Mohamad as secretary. In the winter of 1924, the club moved for the third time to Geziret Al Zamalek on the west bank of the River Nile, and west of Gezira island and became known as Cairo International Sports Club - Zamalek.

In this era, C.I.S.C. won several Egypt Cup, and Cairo League titles. More than a generation emerged in the team that lived in the memory of the Egyptian audience such as; Ali El Hassani, Galal Kuraitam, Abdelrahman Fawzi, Moustafa Taha, Mohamed Latif, Ali Riadh and others.

== Domestic domination (1941–1952) ==
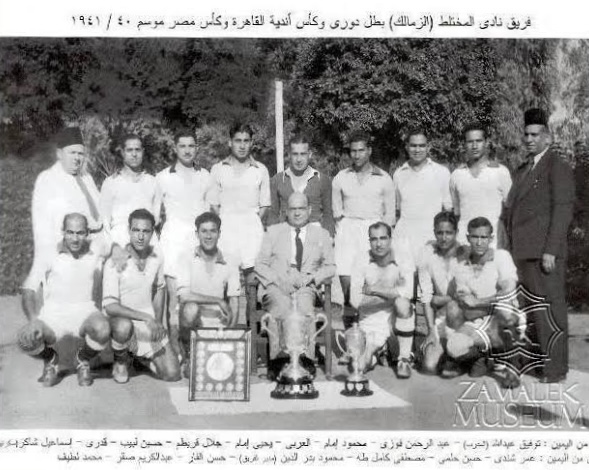
Zamalek football team, winners of 1940–41; Egypt Cup, Cairo League and King Fouad Cup, 1941

Farouk I, King of Egypt and Sudan, who was a fan of Zamalek himself, bestowed royal sponsorship upon the club, the club was granted the honorific title and requested by the King to change its name to Nady Farouk El Awal (Farouk I Club). Accordingly, Ismail Bek Shirin (of the Muhammad Ali dynasty) took the post of the vice president.

Zamalek started the 1940s with dominating all the major football tournaments in Egypt, they won the 1939–40 and 1940-41 Cairo League consecutively and the 1940 King's Cup. With Mohamed Latif still on the pitch and with the help of Tewfik Abdullah, the head coach and Zamalek's forward in the 1920s, the team was unbeatable.

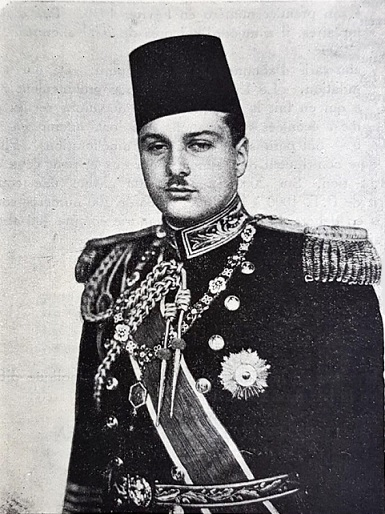
King Farouk I, namesake and honorary president of Nady Farouk El Awal

In the 1940–41 league's season, Zamalek achieved impressive results, they won eight matches out of ten, scoring five goals or more in five matches. Zamalek scored 37 goals and received only 9 goals. On 30 May 1941, Zamalek was supposed to face Al Ahly in the final match of the league, Zamalek was two points ahead of Ahly with goal difference of 28 compared to Ahly's 13, which means that Ahly needed to win with eight goals or more to win the title. Al Ahly withdrew and Zamalek played an exhibition match instead against El Sekka on that day to celebrate the title.

This period witnessed the club's biggest victories in the history of the Cairo derby (contested with Al Ahly), with a pair of 6–0 wins in the 1941–42 Cairo League and 1944 Cup Final. This record scoreline has not been broken since. The 1943 Egypt Cup was won jointly by Zamalek and Al Ahly following the cancellation of the final match. Zamalek won the Cairo League for five times in the 1940s, seasons won by Zamalek included 1940–41, 1943–44, 1944–45, 1946–47 and 1948–49.

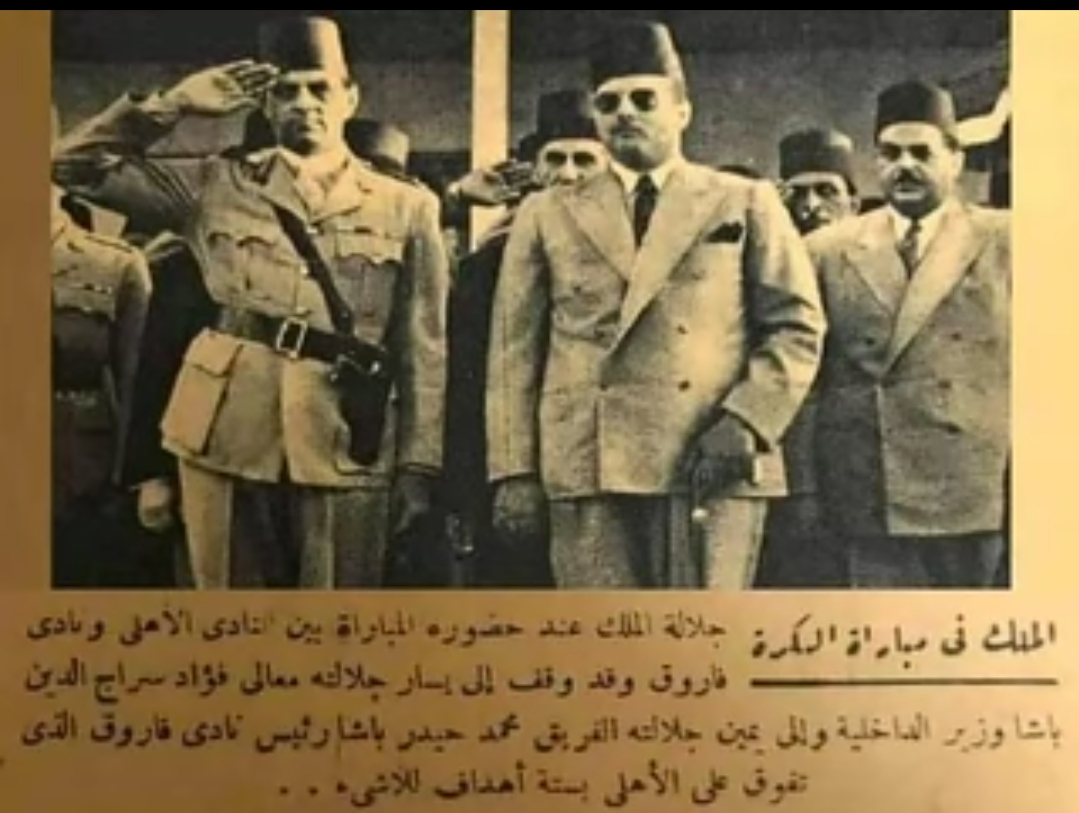
Haidar Pasha (left) with King Farouk I, the Honorary President of Zamalek SC attending the 1944 Egypt Cup final, ended with the largest win in the history of the Cairo derby with a 6–0 win for Zamalek, 2 June 1944

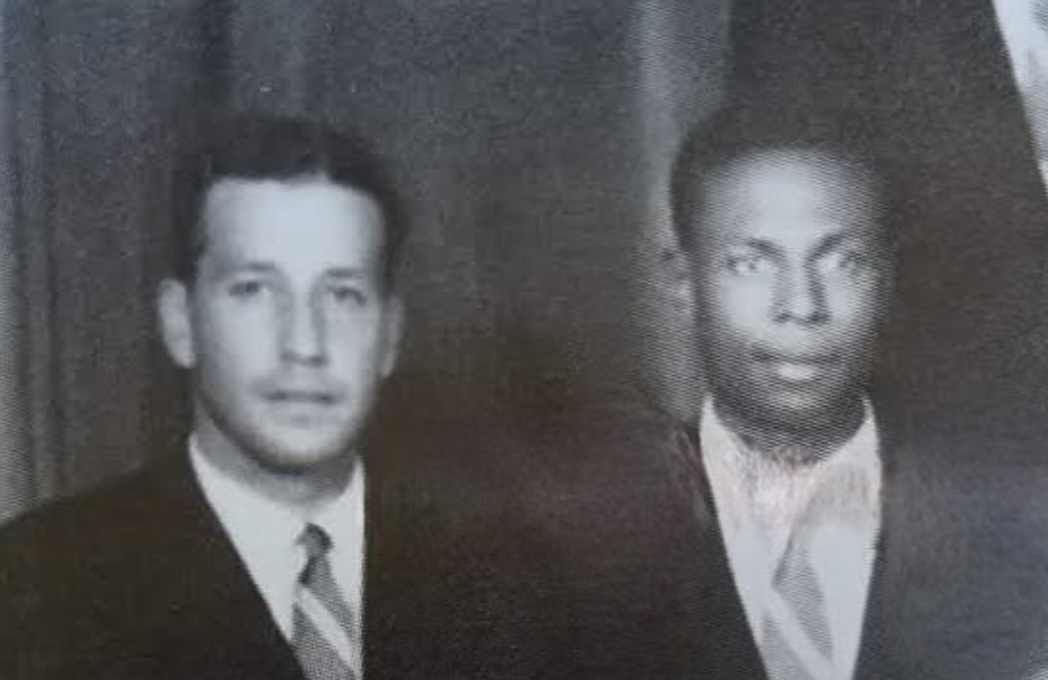
Yehia Emam and Hanafy Bastan, Zamalek's iconic players of the 1940s

A new generation of talents emerged in Egypt, the majority were in Zamalek, such as Yehia Emam, Hanafy Bastan, Omar Shendi, Zoklot, Abdel-Karim Sakr and Mohsen El-Sehaimi. Zamalek won the Cairo League for five times in the 1940s; 1940–41, 1943–44, 1944–45, 1946–47 and 1948–49. Stability in the top management of the club helped to succeed and achieve subsequent titles. Mohammad Haider Pasha was on the head of the Zamalek's administration for nearly three decades. Several football players moved back and forth from Zamalek and Al Ahly, however, each team has its own style and football strategy. Even the team's lineup itself was stable enough for a whole decade.

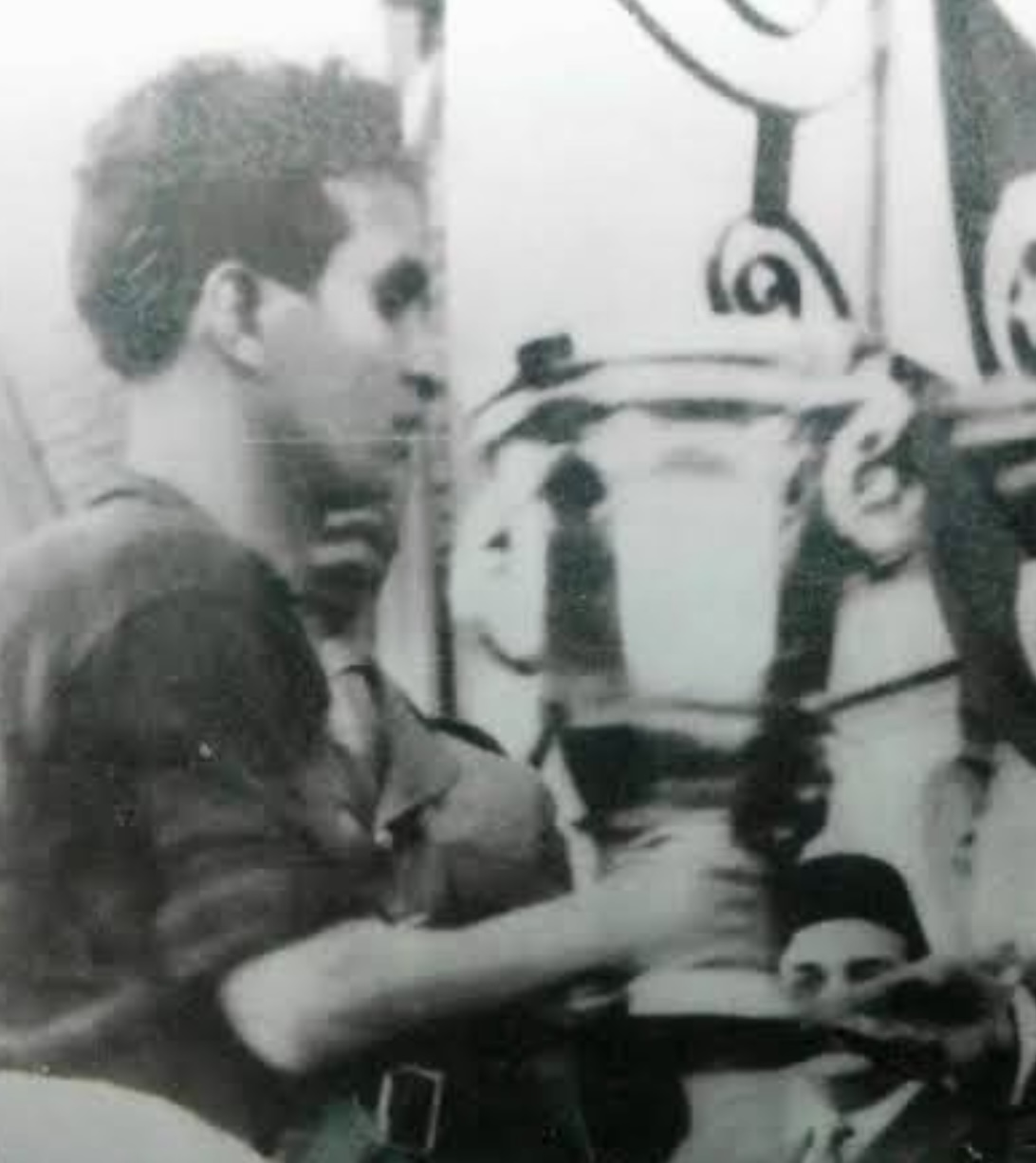
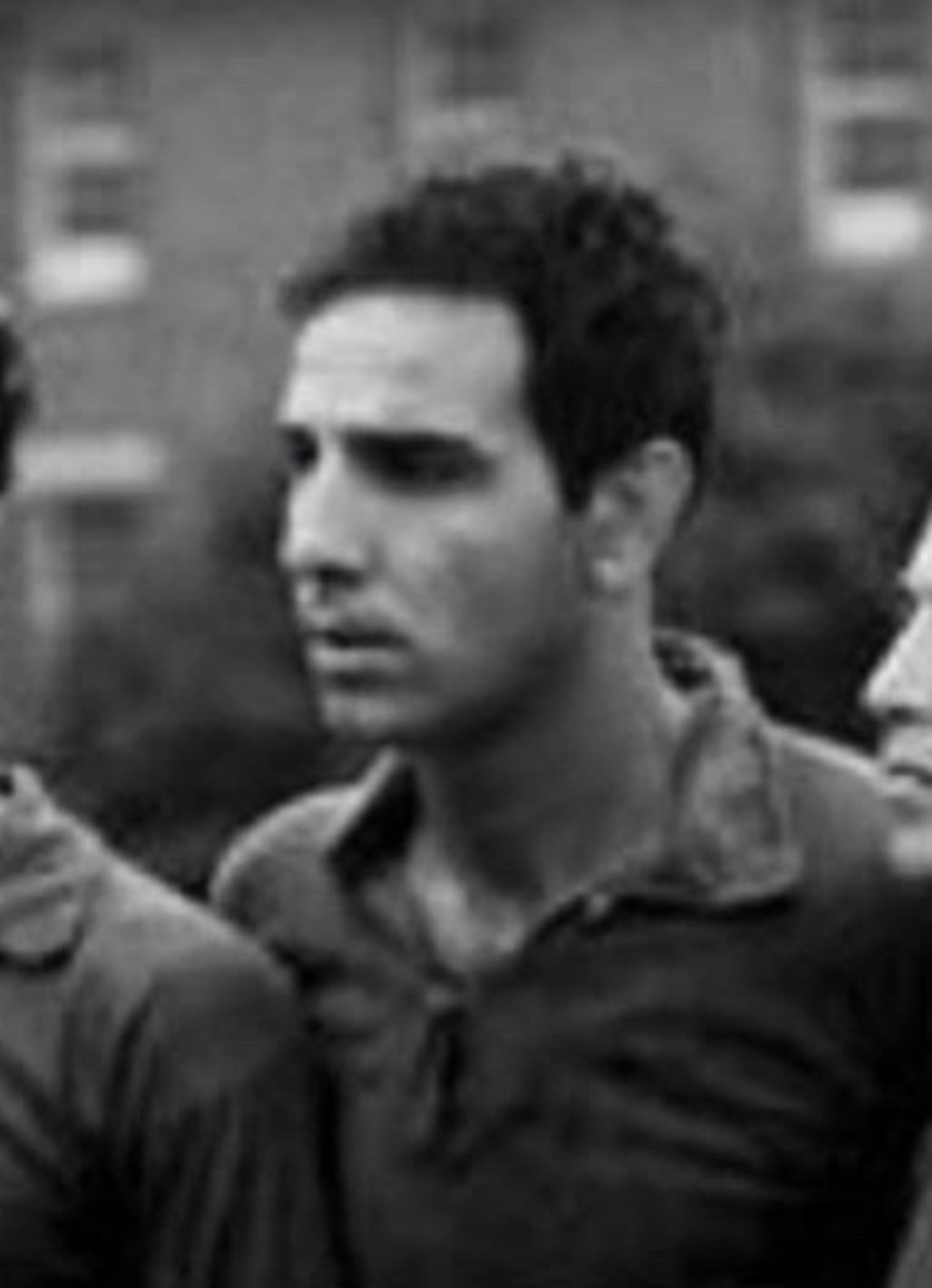
Zamalek's Omar Shendi and Abdel-Karim Sakr

Abdel-Karim Sakr, who moved from Al Ahly to Zamalek in 1939 in a record transfer, played for Zamalek for 14 seasons, scored over 100 goals for the club. Zamalek's management thought that bringing Sakr to the team would not only help improve the team's attacking ability but also stop him from scoring in Zamalek. Sakr was a prolific goal scorer and helped the team in the 1940s in winning several titles and winning as well the Cairo derby. Sakr is the only player who scored in both matches against Al Ahly that finished by a score of 6–0 for Zamalek in 1941–42 Cairo League and 1944 Egypt Cup final.

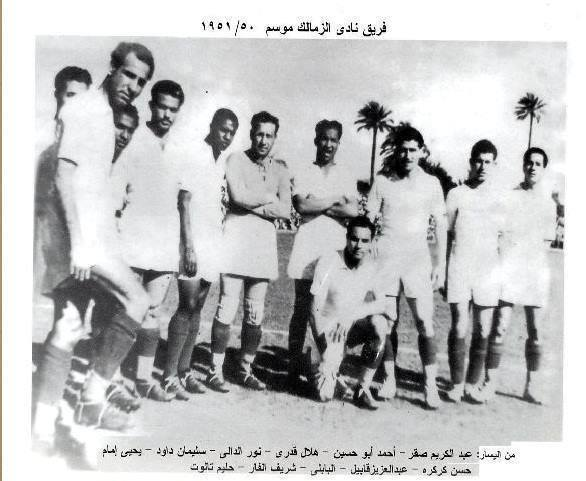
Zamalek's team in the 1950–51 season

In 1948, the newly formed Egyptian League was launched, Zamalek played against Al Masry in the first match on October 22, and Zamalek won by a score of 5–1. The first goal in the history of the Egyptian League was scored by Mohamed Amin, and the first hat-trick was scored by Saad Rustom. Despite not finishing the first two seasons in a good position in the league, Zamalek won the Cairo League for three consecutive seasons. In the 1948–49 Cairo League, Zamalek won the league with narrow margin. In the beginning of the 1950s, Zamalek won the Cairo League for three consecutive seasons; 1950–51, 1951–52 and 1952–53, tying with Al Ahly with 14 titles each. Zamalek finished runner-up in the 1950–51 Egyptian League, winning 11 matches and the champions; Al Ahly won 10, with both finishing with 25 points out of 18 matches, Zamalek lost the title to goal difference. In the 1952 Egypt Cup final, Zamalek defeated Al Ahly in the final with a score of 2–0, Sharif El-Far scored the two goals, Zamalek won their 8th title.

== Sustained success (1952–1984) ==
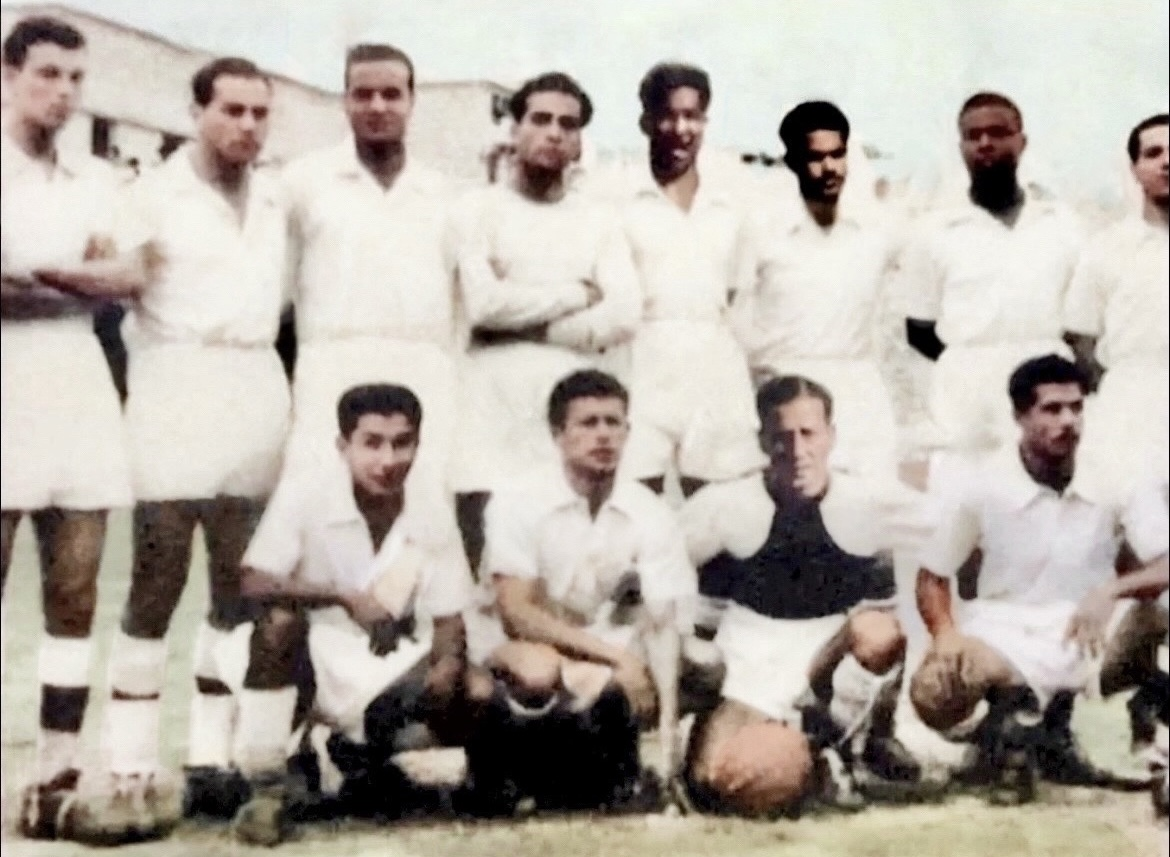
Zamalek squad in 1952

Following the 1952 Egyptian revolution and the overthrow of King Farouk, the club was renamed Zamalek Sporting Club (Zamalek SC) after the area where the club was situated. Soon after, the club moved to its current location on 26 July Street in Cairo, 500 meters west of the Zamalek bridge, occupying an area of 35 acres (140,000 m^{2}) and hosting 24 different sports.

A new board was formed with Mahmoud Shawky as president and secretary and Mohammad Hassan Helmy as assistant secretary. At the time, the rules required that half the club board be changed every year, and Helmy took the position of secretary-general. In 1954, the club's grounds needed renovations, so the board sought a businessman to take over the club and guide the renovation.

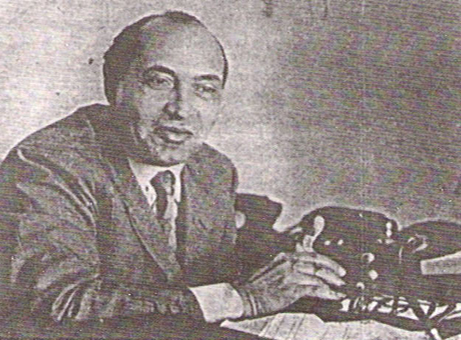
Abdel-Latif Abu-Rajelha, Zamalek's 8th president

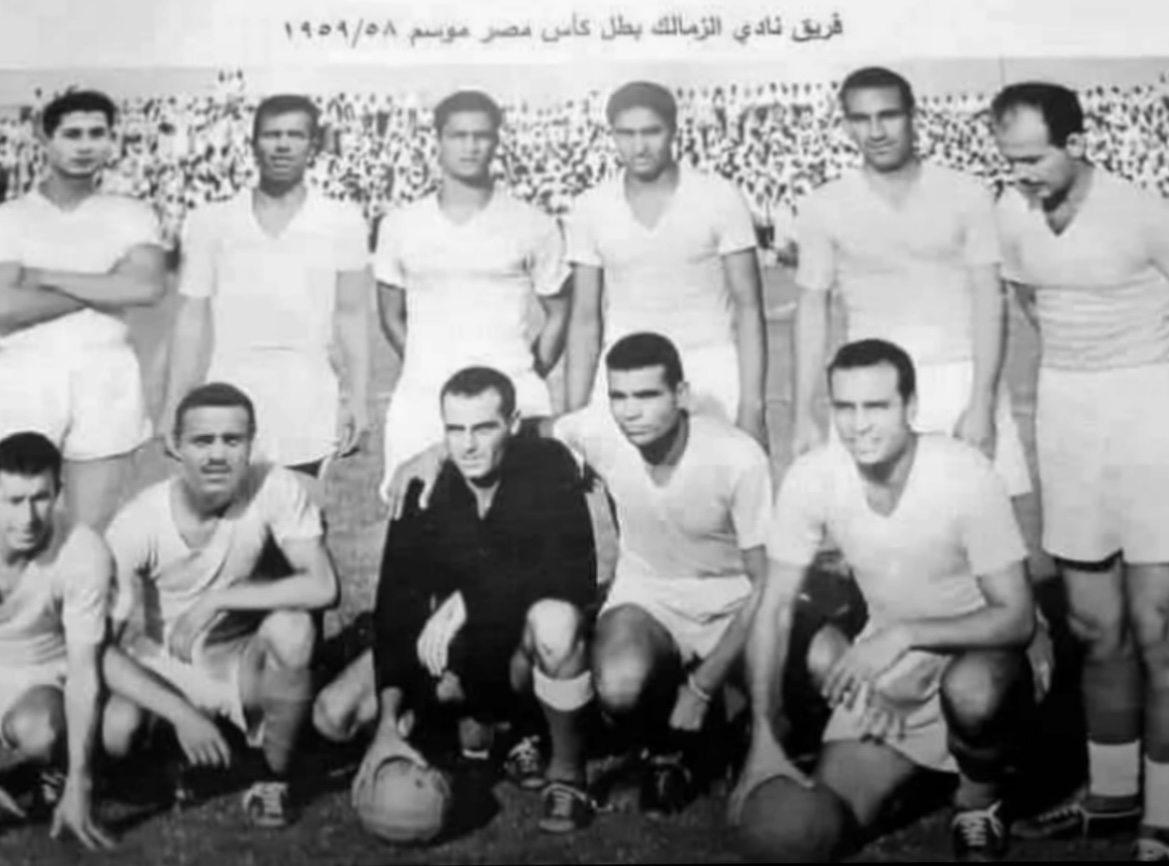
Zamalek's starting lineup in 1959

Essam Baheeg was arguably Zamalek's most valuable player in the 1950s, and credit for his discovery in particular goes to Mohammed Haidar Pasha, the club's president at the time, as Haider Pasha included him in 1949 in the youth team when he was 18 years old. Quickly, Baheeg was able to secure a distinguished position in the starting lineup for the first team and the Egypt national football team as well, thanks to his talent and skills, and he gradually turned into an icon. Baheeg was known for his extreme loyalty and dedication to Zamalek, which increased his popularity among the club's fans and Egyptian football fans in general. He did not play for any other club throughout his 12-year football career, and is considered a symbol of the club throughout its history. Baheeg was a key player in the Egypt national football team and helped his country lift the African Cup of Nations trophy in 1959 by scoring the two winning goals in the final against Sudan. He became a head coach after retirement, and coached Zamalek in the 1980s for only one season and won four titles with the team.

This era saw the emergence of a new generation of players who besides their talents as footballers were known with their loyalty for Zamalek such as; Essam Baheeg, Alaa El-Hamouly, Sharif El-Far, Yakan Hussein, Samir Qotb, and Nour El-Dali. One of the fiercest Egyptian goal scorers of this era was Alaa El-Hamouly, he won with Zamalek seven titles of the Egypt Cup in his 13 seasons with the team, he is Zamalek's all-time top score in the Egypt Cup with 23 goals, he is also Zamalek's 3rd all-time top scorer of the Cairo derby with 9 goals after Mostafa Taha (12 goals) and Abdel Karim Sakr (10 goals).

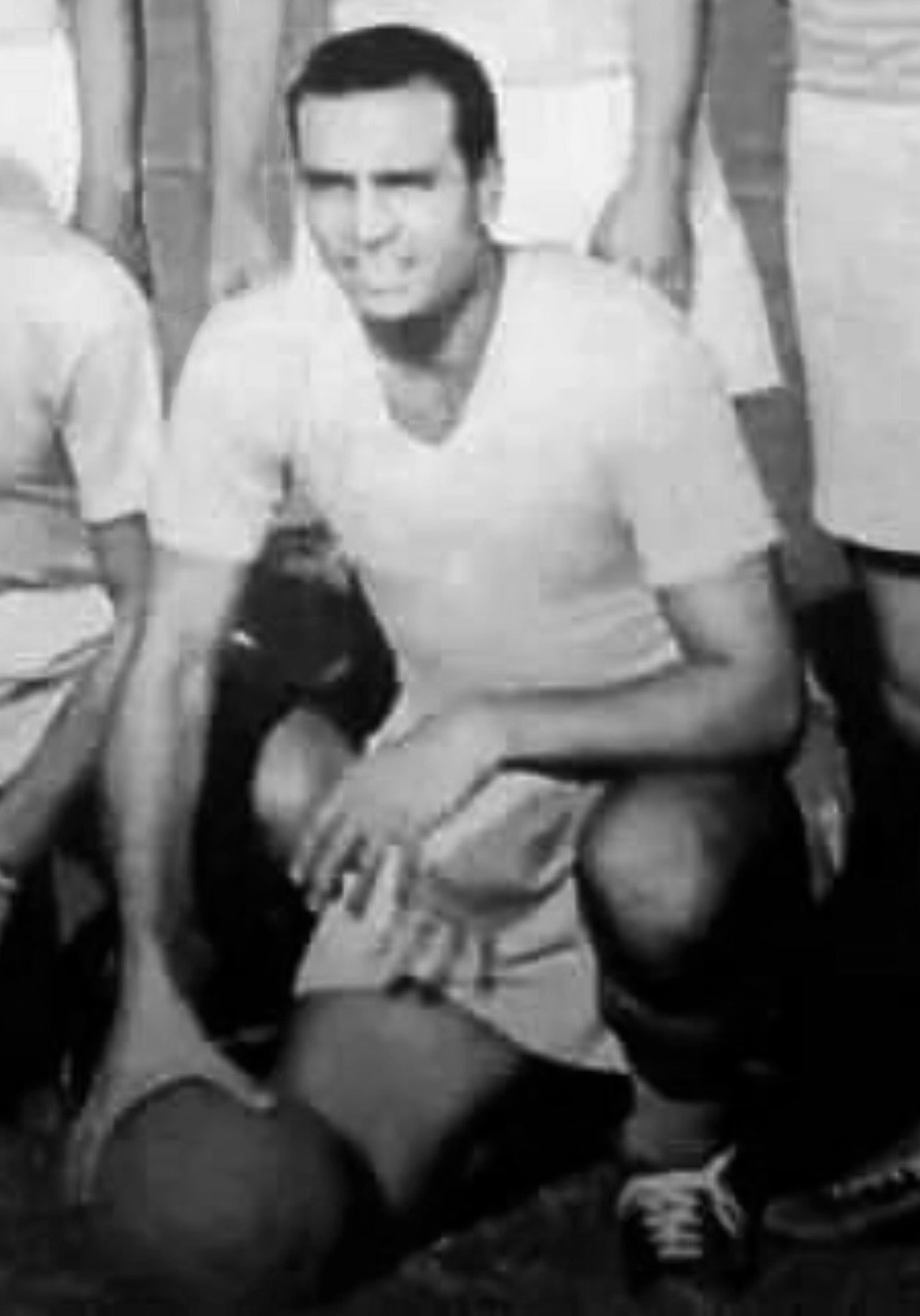
Zamalek's striker Alaa El-Hamouly

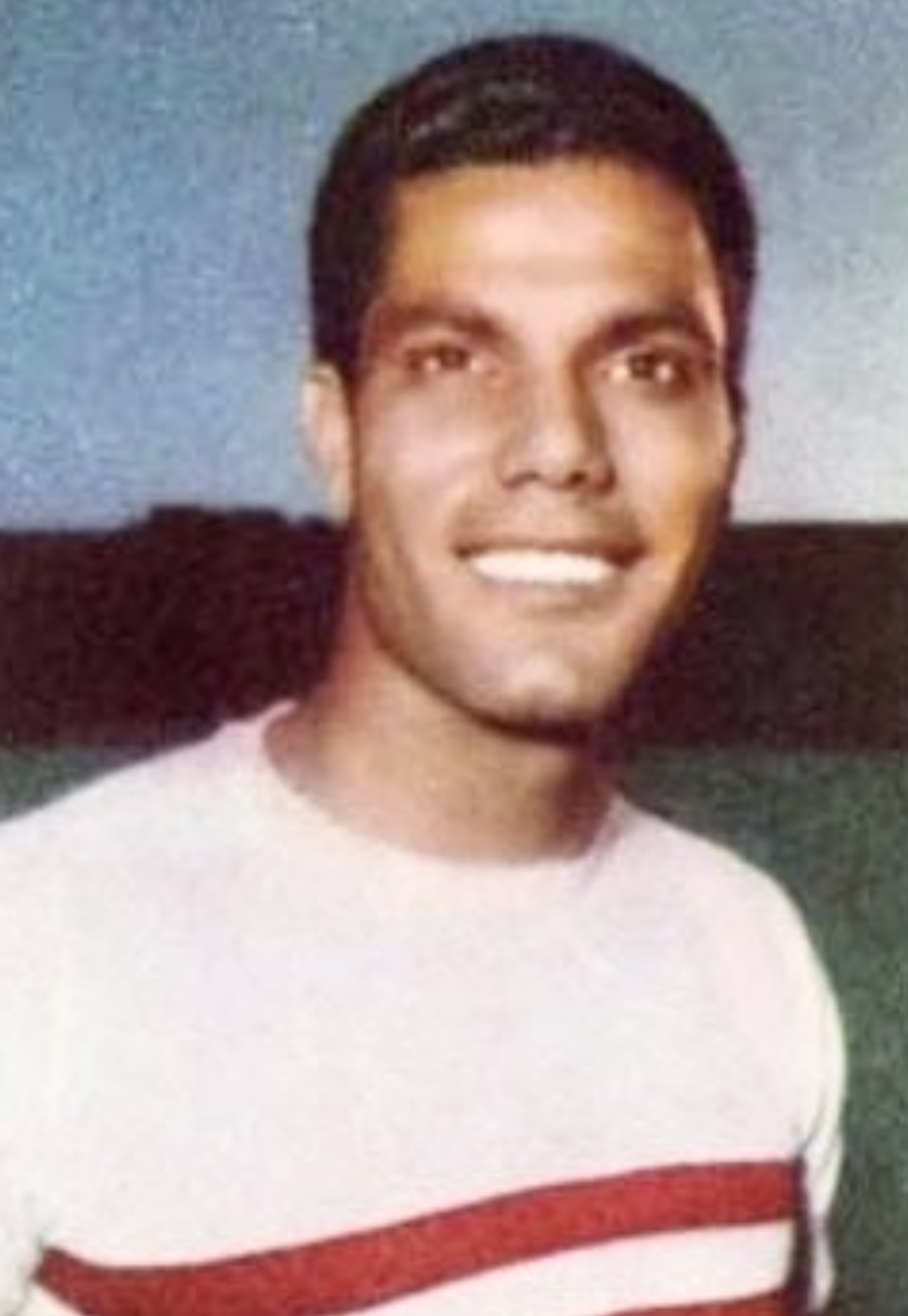
Zamalek's midfielder Raafat Attia

In 1959, Zamalek bought Ali Mohsen, a Yemeni striker, he scored two goals in the 3–2 win over El Olympi in the 1960 Egypt Cup final and was the first non-Egyptian top scorer of the League's 1960–61 season. Zamalek won 6 titles of the Egypt Cup from 1952 to 1960, starting with 1952 through 1955, followed by four consecutive titles in; 1957, 1958 (shared), 1959 and 1960. The club won the Cairo League for 3 consecutive seasons; 1950–51, 1951–52, 1952–53, the tournament was stopped til the final season of 1957–58 and it was defunct permanently.

Abd El Hamid El Shawarbi took the presidency and, although, he was elected for a second period, he was not able to do the job he wanted in the club management. While he was out of the country, Haidar Pasha and Haj Sayed El Annany contributed to forming the VIP and first-class stadium stands; when he came back, he resigned and Shawky became president of the board again. The idea of bringing a businessman to help the club did not subside, thus, businessman Abd El Latif Abo Regeila became the club president in 1956; by then, the rules had been changed allowing the board to stay for 3 years.

Once again, Shawky stepped down. Although Regeila was re-elected for a second term, he had to leave Egypt after he lost his money due to the governmental policy against private property. Alwe El Gazzar, the owner of El Sheikh Sherieb Company and then president of the board of the Coca-Cola Company, was then elected president in 1961.

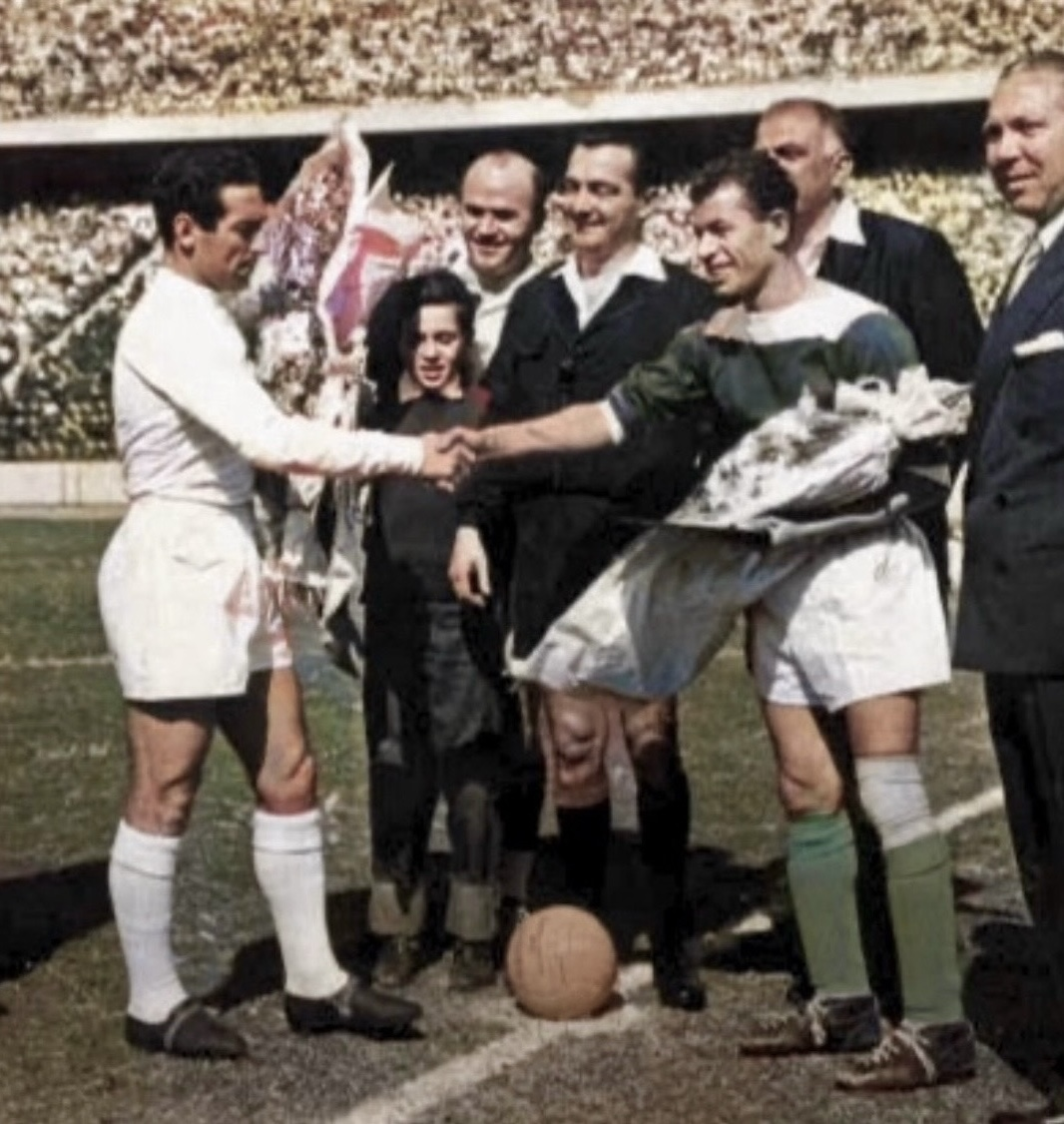
Sharif El-Far shaking hands with Real Madrid's captain Paco Gento before their friendly match on the occasion of celebrating 50 years on Zamalek's establishment, 10 March 1961

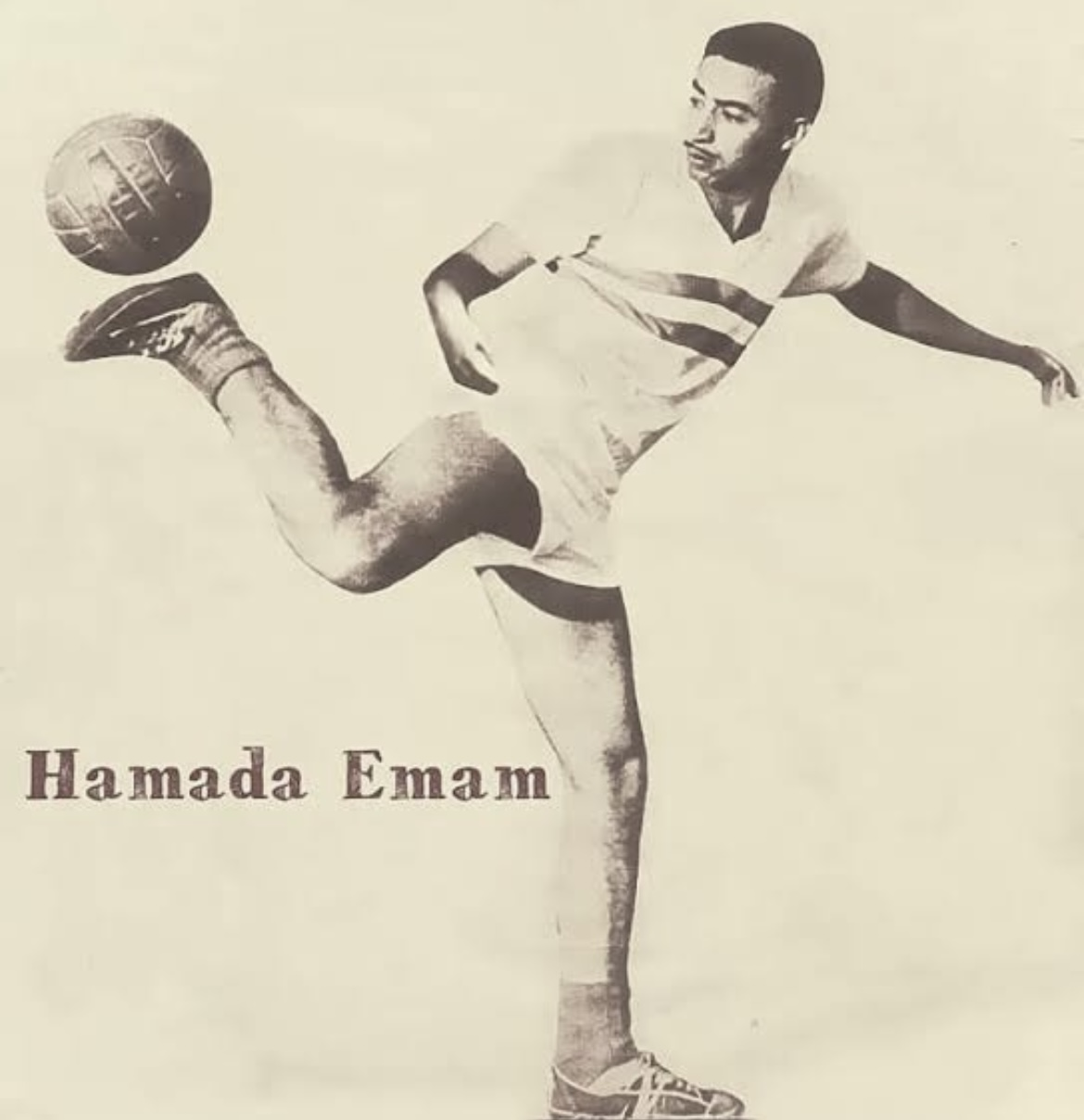
Hamada Emam, Zamalek's forward in the 1960s

With the beginning of the 1960s, a new generation emerged in Zamalek and the Egyptian football, such as Ahmed Rifaat, Nabil Nosair, Hamada Emam, Aldo Stella, Ahmed Mostafa, Mahmoud Abou-Regaila and Abdou Noshi. The popularity of Zamalek increase in the 1960s, and that this era was one of the first periods in which competitions and conflicts occurred between the Zamalek and Al-Ahly, due to a number of writers publishing articles that inflamed one party at the expense of the other. Al-Ahly was then going through a difficult period in its history, and there were a large number of issues related to corruption that struck the Egyptian sports field, which were embodied by the journalist writer Yusuf Sibai in one of his novels and several articles.

Abdellatif Abu Regeila, who was an Egyptian businessman and pioneer of public transport buses in Cairo. During his reign as Zamalek's president, the Zamalek Stadium was constructed, as well as the social building continued as the club's official president until 1961. In 1961, Zamalek invited Real Madrid to play a match in Cairo. Hamada Emam was a popular player on the club who helped raise the club's profile.

In 1962, there was a new board with Hassan Amer as a president, emeritus deputy Shawky, Mohamed Latif, Galal Kereitam, Mahmoud Emam, and Mahmoud Hafez. Amer stayed as president until the 1967 war. After the war, Zamalek hosted Ismaily SC and Al Masry SC clubs, as well as the other Suez Canal teams at its grounds.

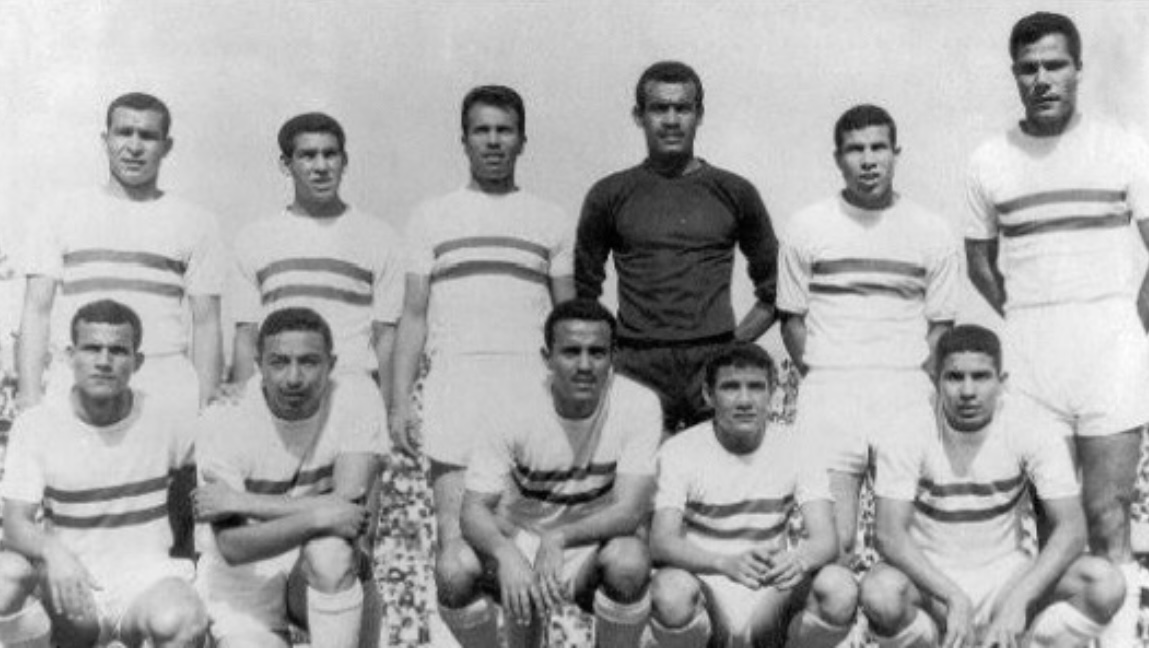
Zamalek squad in 1964

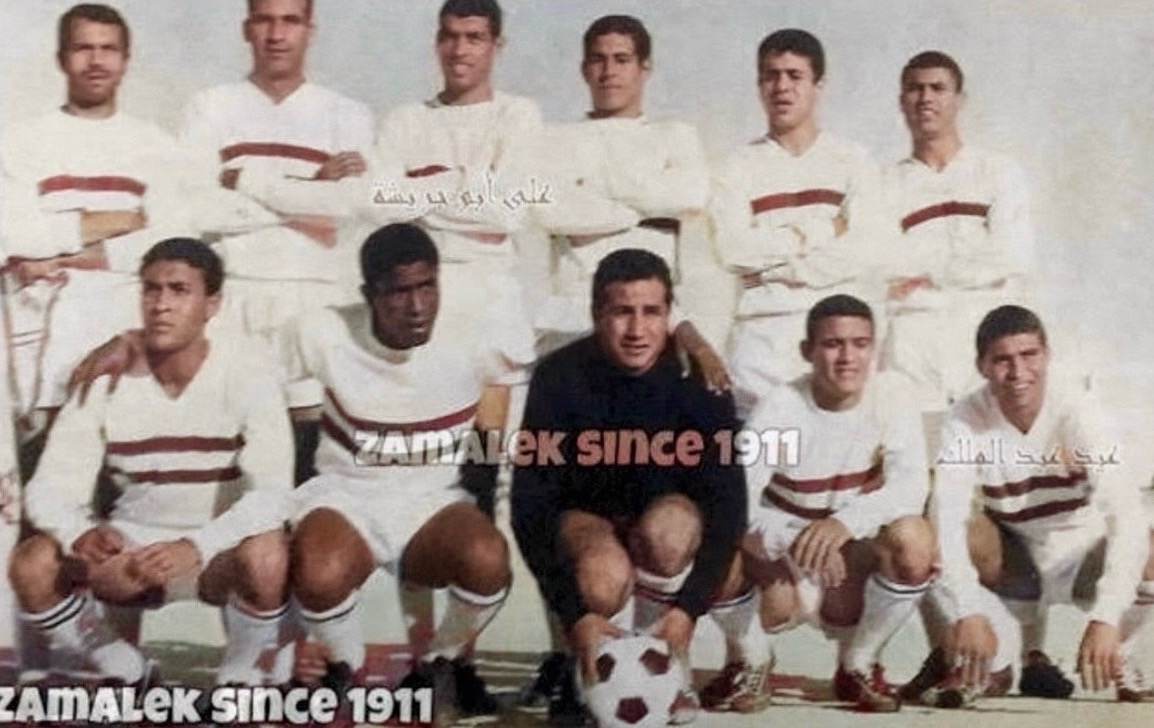
Zamalek SC team in 1969

In 1966, Zamalek invited West Ham United F.C. to play in Cairo, West Ham were the title holders of the 1964–65 European Cup Winners. Zamalek made a phenomenal match and hammered the European champions with a score of 5–1, at a time when the English club was at the peak of its glory and playing in its ranks were six of the stars of the England national team, headed by Bobby Moore. Hamada Emam scored a hat-trick, Taha Basry and Abdel-Karim El-Gohary scored the other two goals.

In 1967, Minister of Youth and Sports Talaat Khairy decided that the club boards would be appointed rather than elected, and Helmy Zamora took the presidency and was the first Egyptian sportsman in Egypt to become a president of a club. He remained as president until July 1971 where the rules were changed to allow board elections again and to forbid anyone from being president if they had already held to presidency for two consecutive terms.

Tawfeek El Kheshen took over the presidency and the honorary presidency was given to Helmy. The 1970s generation was one of the best generations of football in Zamalek, and it included legendary players in the history of Egyptian and Arab football. This era's team included talented players such as Taha Basry, Hassan Shehata, Farouk Gaafar, Ibrahim Youssef, Mahmoud Saad, Ali Khalil and Mahmoud El-Khawaga.

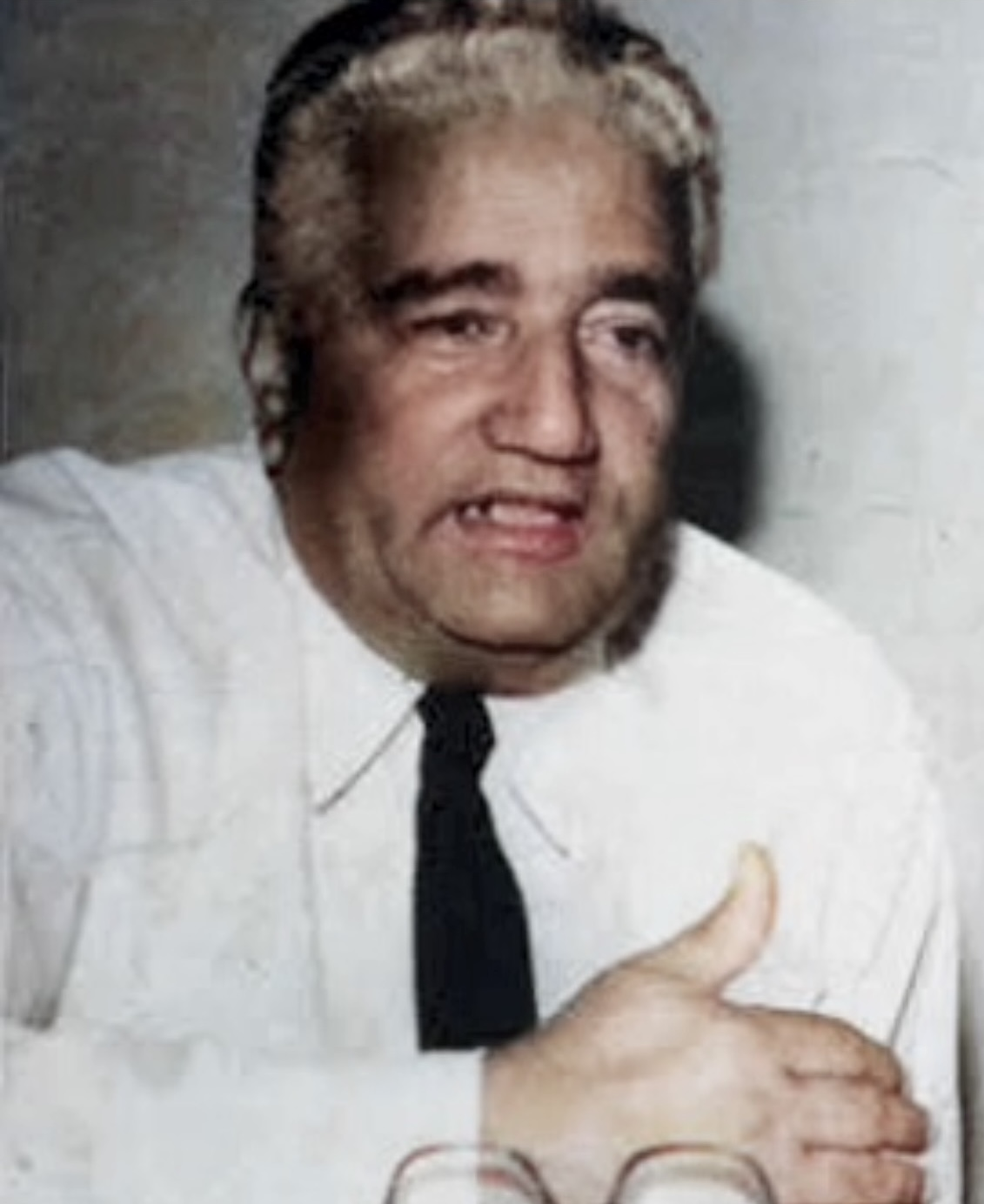
Helmy Zamora

In 1973, Helmy Zamora was elected president. Mohammed Hassan Helmi is one of the most famous members of the club now known as Zamalek. He joined Zamalek in 1934 as a player in his youth, where he played for fourteen years. he won the Cairo League for six times in 1940, 1941, 1944 and 1947, and the Egypt Cup five times in 1935, 1938, 1941, 1943, and 1944. He was also selected to represent Egypt at the 1936 Olympics. Following his career as a player, he was active member in the Zamalek administration, eventually serving as president from 1967 through 1984, except a year in 1971-1972 of El-Kheshen. Helmy also held positions with the Egyptian Football Association, including the presidency, and served as referee, both domestically and internationally. He refused compensation for his administrative activities, drawing a salary from his position in the Ministry of Agriculture instead.

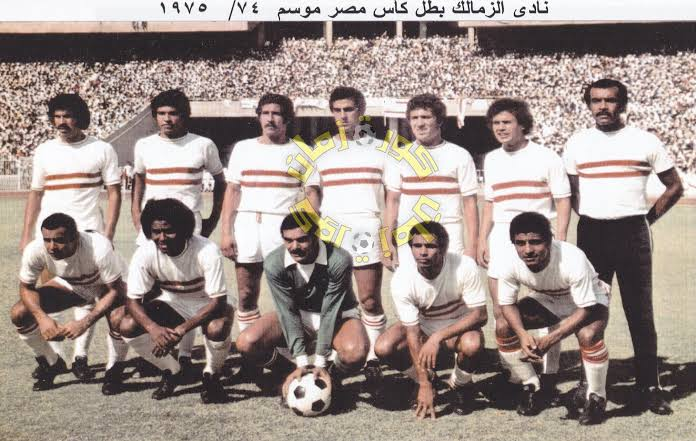
Zamalek SC team in 1975

In 1975 Egypt Cup Final, which Zamalek played against Ghazl El Mahalla, they won by a score of 1–0, Shehata scored the winning goal giving his team their 15th title and himself the first one. In the 1978–79 league season, Zamalek's striker Ali Khalil had a famous incident of high integrity, when he scored an incorrect goal after he shot the ball which passed through the torn outer net and landed in the goal against Ismaily in a famous match. Unfortunately, this goal was important in the chase for the title, however he encountered the referee Ahmed Bilal, the referee of the match, and told him that the ball was not a goal, and the goal was canceled after it had been awarded amid major objections from the Ismaily players and fans. Ali Khalil was an outstanding goal scorer who scored 94 goals for Zamalek in 9 seasons. He was one of Egypt's prominent players of this era. Khalil scored in both of the 1977 and 1979 Egypt Cup finals, he was nicknamed "Dangerous Ali" by Zamalek fans. He was the Egyptian Premier League's top scorer in 1976-77 and 1979–80 seasons.

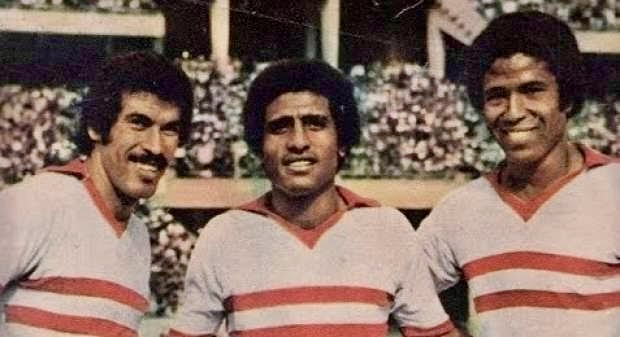
Zamalek's stars Hassan Shehata, Farouk Gaafar and Taha Basry

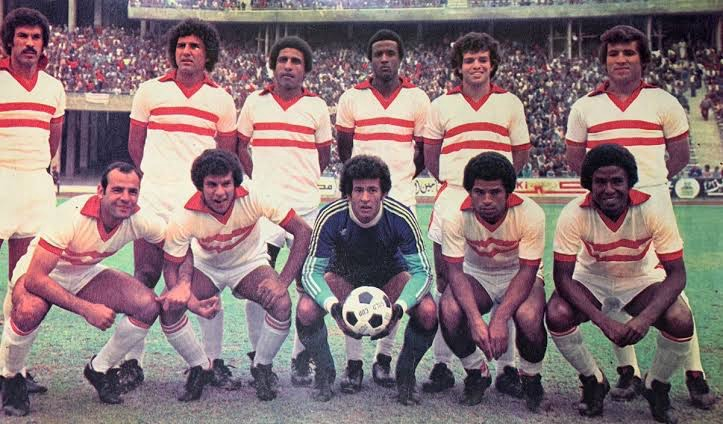
Zamalek SC team in 1978

Zamalek were still called "Qahir-al-Aganib" (the conqueror of foreigners), despite not playing against foreigners regularly. They met Bayern Munich on 21 December 1977 in a friendly match at the Cairo Stadium, Zamalek succeeded in defeating the Bavarians with a score of 3–2, and goals scorers were Waheed Kamel, Mohamed Taher, and Ali Khalil.

Zamalek won the Egypt Cup for another two times in the 1970s, in 1977 and 1979. Besides the Egyptian Premier League trophy in the 1959–60 season. Zamalek won the Egyptian Premier League in 1963–64, 1964–65, 1977–78, and 1983–84. The team also won the October League Cup, which is the tournament that was held as an alternative to the Egyptian Premier League because of Egypt hosting the 1974 African Cup of Nations.

== African Uprising (1984–2005) ==
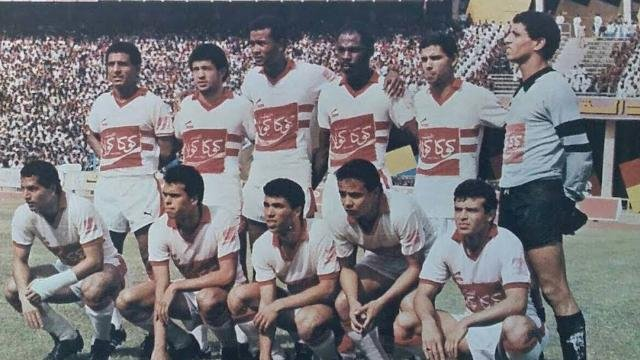
Zamalek SC team, winners of the first African Cup of Champions Clubs title for the club in 1984

Hassan Amer became club president again in 1984, in the same year that Zamalek won their first CAF Champions League title after beating Nigeria's Shooting Stars S.C. 2–0 at Cairo and 0–1 at Lagos. A second title came in the 1986 season. Hassan Abo el Fetouh took over from Amer in 1988. During his presidency, the Ministry of Youth and Sports introduced a new rule increasing the number of elected board numbers to ten (although this was reduced again in 1990), and the club built several new buildings, including a gymnasium that is considered to be one of the biggest in the Middle East. Fetouh also increased the funding for most of the club's sports teams and helped achieve several championships. After Fetouh's death in 1990, Galal Ibrahim became temporary president until September 1990, when Nour El-Dali was elected.

Ibrahim was chosen again as president in 1992. New rules required that the vice treasurer be selected by board members; Hamada Emam was selected by default, while Abdel Hamid Shaheen was elected treasurer. The board members were Ahmed Shereen Fawzy, Mahmoud Marouf, Mohamad Fayez El Zummur, Raouf Gaser, and Tarek Ghonaim. An additional requirement was that the board was to have two members under the age of 30, leading to Samy Abo El Kheir and Ihab Ibrahim being elected. The final board members, chosen by the Ministry of Youth and Sports, were Mohamad Amer, General Hanafy Reyad, and Farouk Abo El Nasr.

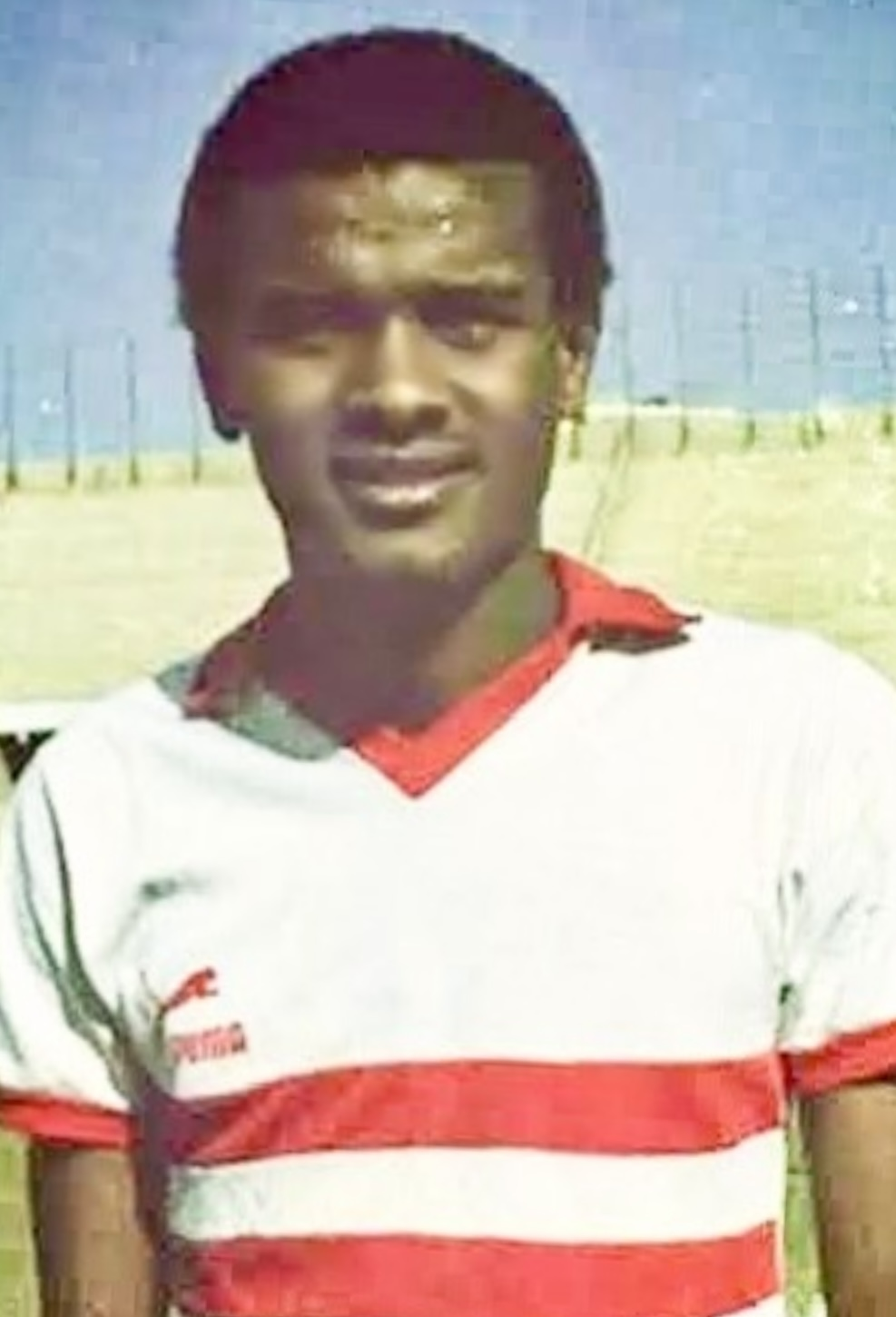
Zamalek's defender Ibrahim Youssef

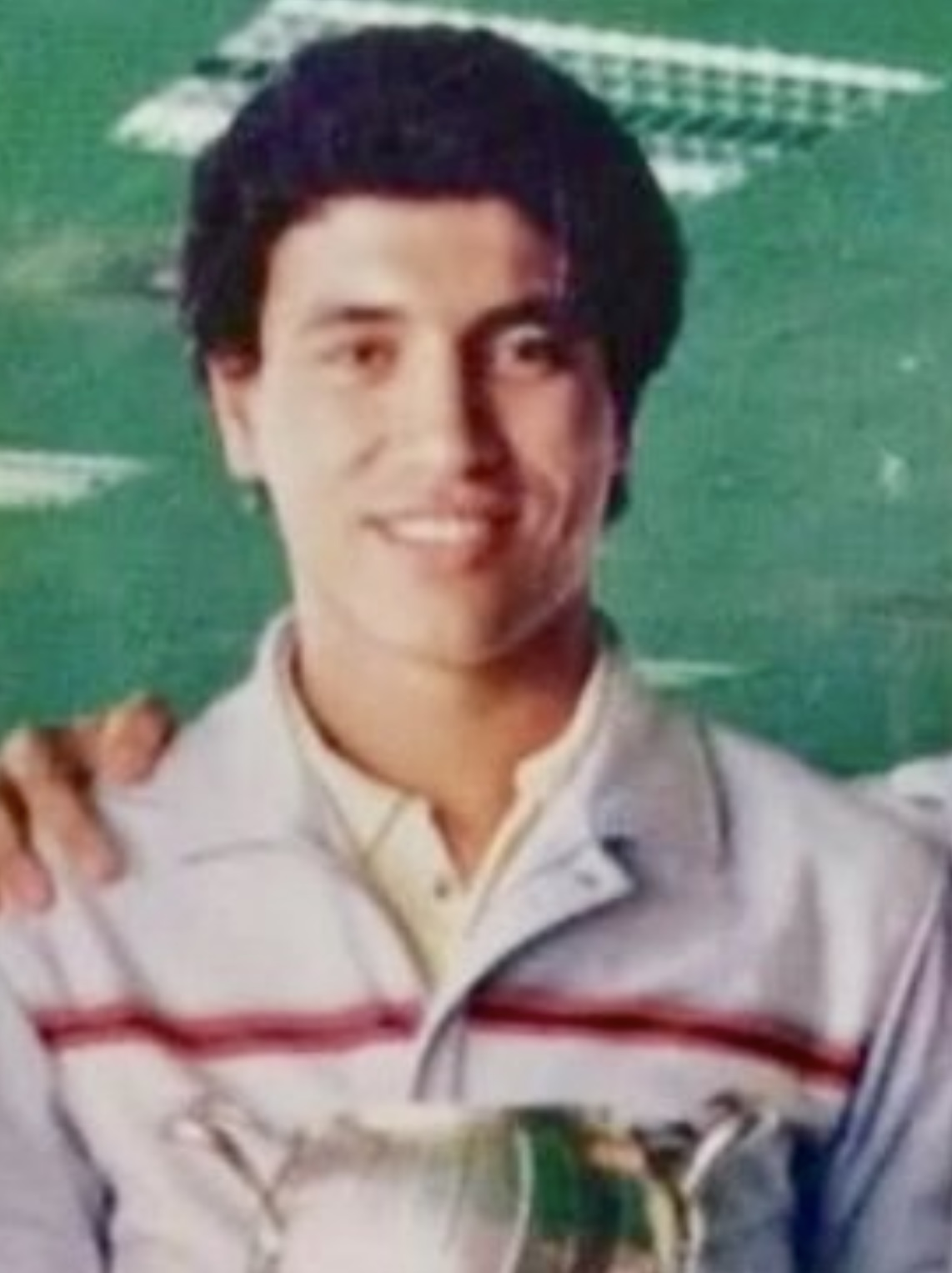
Zamalek's striker Gamal Abdel Hamid

In 1993, Zamalek won their third CAF Champions League title in the 1993 season, followed by the 1994 African Super Cup, which was the first time in history to be with two Egyptian contenders, Zamalek won Al Ahly in the African Game of the 20th Century by Ayman Mansour's goal. By 1994, Abdel Hamid Shaheen was unable to continue his treasurer duties due to sickness, but the board chose to keep him in his position in honor of his devotion to the club and Farouk Abo El Nasr was appointed to take over his duties.

In 1995, four members of the board — Mahmoud Marouf, Mohamad Fayez El Zummur, and Dr. Mohamad Amer — were removed due to their absences from six board meetings. They were replaced by Mortada Mansour, Mahmoud Abdallah, Mounnir Hassan, and Ibrahim Latif. The Ministry objected to having a board made up of both appointed and elected members, and Hassan and Latif forfeited their positions.

Mohamad Amer and Farouk Abo El Nasr were elected in their wake, in support of their abilities and dedication. Shereen Fawzy was selected to be treasurer until the next election. Following the events of the 1995–96 season between Zamalek and Ahly, season 1995–96 season a one-year temporary club board was selected with Kamal Darwish as president, Abd EL Aziz Kabil as vice president, Mahmoud Badr El Deen as treasurer, and Hanafy Reyad, Magdy Sharaf, Ismail Selim, Azmy Megahed, and Mohamad Abd El Rahman Fawzy as board members.

In 1996, Zamalek won their 4th CAF Champions League title, followed by the 1997 CAF Super Cup. In the same year, Zamalek won the South Korean side Pohang Steelers in the 1997 Afro-Asian Club Championship, to be the only team to win this championship for two times in a record never broken to date.

Kamal Darwish was the president of Zamalek club for two terms from 1996 to 2005. He presided over one of Zamalek's most successful periods across all sports, including football. In January 2001, Hazem Emam returned from Europe and joined Zamalek, he made an impressive performance with Zamalek and helped the team in his second spell with outstanding goals and assists. Ahmed Hossam Mido, considered one of Egypt's best players, started his football career in 1999 at Zamalek, at the age of 16. After retiring in 2013, he became Zamalek's manager and won the 2013–14 Egypt Cup as the youngest Egyptian coach to win a championship.

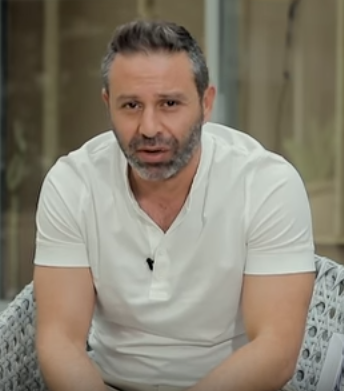
Hazem Emam, Zamalek's attacking midfielder, nicknamed the "Emperor"

Zamalek won 16 football championships during his reign, meaning that Darwish is Zamalek's most successful president in its history. Zamalek was the first Egyptian team to qualify for the 2001 FIFA Club World Championship in Spain (although this was cancelled by FIFA due to funding issues). The club won the African Champions League in 2002, two African Super Cup seasons in 1996 and 2003, and the first two Egyptian Super Cup seasons in 2001 and 2002. Zamalek also won the Egyptian Premier League in the 2000–01, 2002–03 and 2003–04 seasons, and the Egypt Cup in the 1999 and 2002 seasons.

== Regression (2005–2013) ==
In 2005, Egypt's Minister of Sports dismissed several club boards of Zamalek SC which led to organizational uncertainty because of the changes of board of directors within the period between 2005 and 2013. The football team only won two titles in this period; the Egypt Cup in 2007–08 and 2012–13.

Shikabala, Zamalek's winger, is one of the most prominent talents in the history of Egyptian football, who carried the banner of Zamalek and preserved the popularity of Zamalek in that difficult period. The level of Zamalek continued to decline, and its administration destabilized since Mortada Mansour assumed the presidency of the club in 2005.

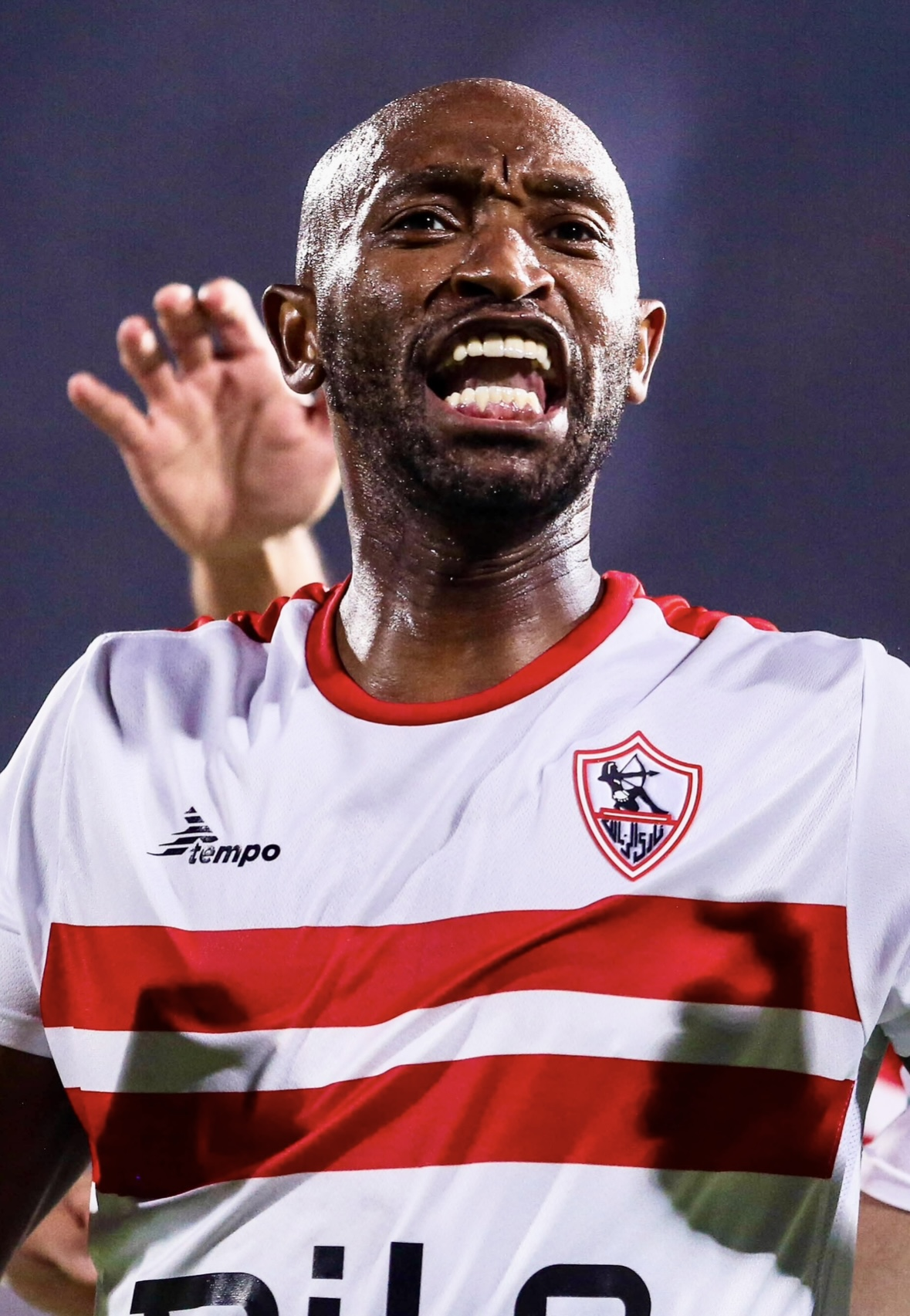
Shikabala, Zamalek's iconic forward, and the most decorated player in the history of the club.

Despite managerial difficulties, a new generation emerged in Zamalek in this era with several notable players at the Egypt national football team, such as: Shikabala, Amr Zaki, Omar Gaber, Mohamed Abdel Shafy, and Mohamed Abou Gabal. Also several Zamalek's players were part of the Egyptian squad that won the Africa Cup of Nations for three consecutive times in 2006, 2008 and 2010. The club experienced administrative instability and had several different presidents over just a few years. Mortada Mansour assumed the presidency in 2005 but his board was dissolved shortly after. He was succeeded by Morsi Atallah; Mansour then took the presidency again after but this was also short-lived, as the National Sports Council intervened and appointed a board headed by Muhammad Amir.

Mohamed Amir's term lasted for a year until elections were held in May 2009, which resulted in the election of Mamdouh Abbas as the club's president. Abbas' board was dissolved in 2010 after Mansour obtained a court ruling stating that the elections were rigged, so an interim council, headed by Jala Ibrahim, was installed. Mansour eventually dropped his lawsuit and Abbas returned to the presidency. He was succeeded by Taher Abu Zaid, who then formed an interim council headed by Kamal Darwish.

== Reconstruction and reform (2014–) ==
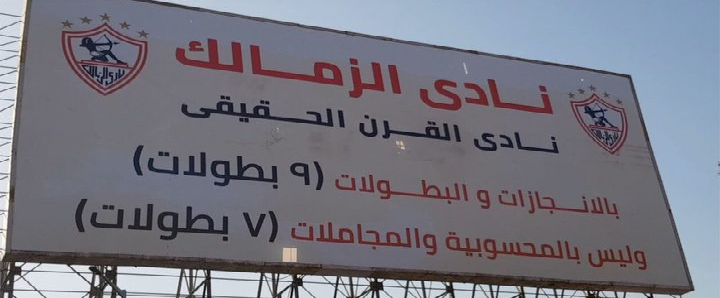

In 2014, Mortada Mansour became Zamalek's president for the third time, and Zamalek rebounded. In his first year, Zamalek won the 2014 Egypt Cup Final (defeating Smouha SC 1–0). The 2014–15 Egyptian Premier League season was equally successful, with players such as Tariq Hamed and Ayman Hefny helping the team win the championship by a nine-point lead with only one loss. Since 2014, the club has won 11 championships. Mansour announced that "The trademark 'Real Football Club of the Century' is registered in the Ministry of Supply and Trade in Egypt." Zamalek sent a complaint to the Egyptian Football Association in preparation for escalating the case of the Century Club to FIFA and the International Sports Court.

In the 2015 Egypt Cup Final, Zamalek defeated rival team Al Ahly SC (2–0) and achieved their third consecutive championship title. They then qualified for the semi-finals of the 2015 CAF Confederation Cup. In 2016, Zamalek finished runner-up in the CAF Champions League and won the Egypt Cup and the Egypt Super Cup. Two more Egypt Cup titles followed in 2018 and 2019. Zamalek won four other titles in 2019: the CAF Confederation Cup, the Saudi-Egyptian Super Cup, the Egyptian Super Cup and the 2020 CAF Super Cup. since 2014, the football team won 11 championships, the last of which was the Egyptian Super Cup and the CAF Super Cup that were achieved in the span of one week.

Zamalek and RS Berkane squads in the 2019 Confederation Cup final

The Ministry of Youth and Sports suspended Zamalek's board of directors due to financial violations on Sunday 29 November 2020. The Egyptian Ministry of Sports and Youth named Emad Abdel-Aziz as Zamalek's new president to succeed Ahmed Bakry, who died due to COVID-19. Then Hussein Labib has been appointed the new Zamalek president of normalization committee. And the football team was able to obtain the Egyptian Premier League championship after the absence of six years from achieving the championship and Zamalek was also able to win the Egypt Cup in the same year, despite the difficult conditions that the club was going through in 2020–21 season.

On 22 November 2021, Mansour and his board of directors officially returned to Zamalek SC management, following the departure of the normalization committee until the club's elections. On 12 February 2022, Mansour became the president of Zamalek club for the third time, after the elections held by the club through the general assembly. In the 2021–22 season, the football team managed to achieve the Egyptian League for a second consecutive year and Egypt cup, despite the penalty of the International Football Association (FIFA) to suspend the players' registration. In 2022–23 season, the club was suspended for the third time by FIFA, but maintained the main structure of the team.

On August 19, 2023, the Board of Directors of Zamalek submitted a collective resignation following the administration's failure to solve the club's crises and debts. This failure resulted in a ban on registering players, an inability to win most of the games and championships, and the cessation of work at the club's branch in 6th of October City. The Youth and Sports Directorate appointed Hassan Moussa as executive management of the Zamalek Club, Ahmed Fouad Al-Watan as financial director, and Ayman Abdel Moneim as director of sports activities. The Ministry of Youth and Sports announced, in an official statement, the replacement of Hassan Moussa, CEO of Zamalek Club, with Imad Mustafa El-Banani until the elections for the new Board of Directors are held .

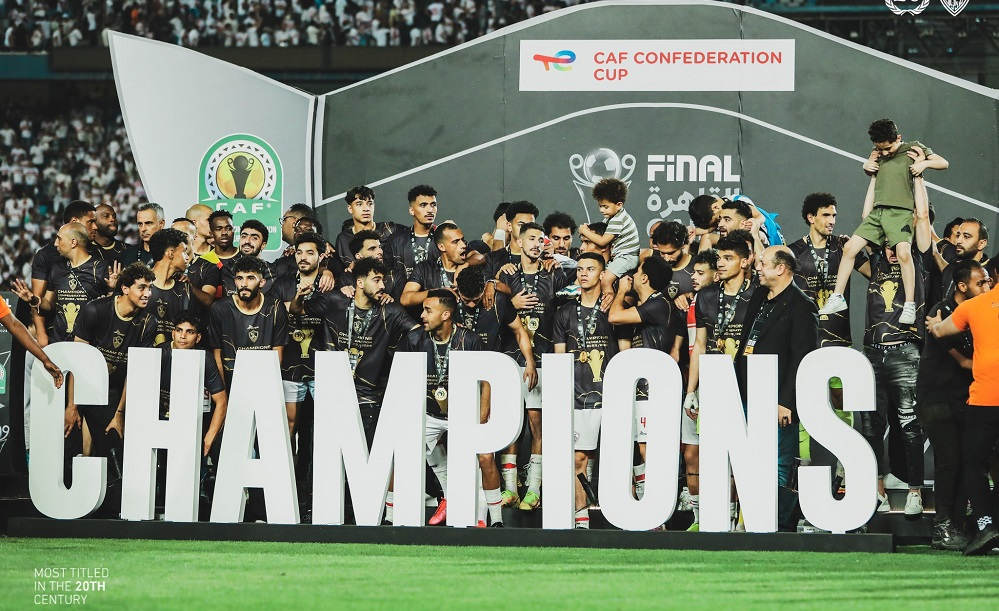
Zamalek SC team that won the CAF Confederation Cup in 2024

On 21 October 2023, the unified list, headed by Hussein Labib, succeeded in winning the elections of Zamalek Club, by a large margin of votes from their closest rivals in all positions, except for the position of vice president, which witnessed a fierce competition between Hisham Nasr and Hany El Attal, before the former won it by a margin of more than 400 votes, to start the White Club a new era with the Labib board for the next 4 years.

Zamalek SC have defeated RS Berkane on away goals to win the 2023–24 CAF Confederation Cup title for the second time in the club's history, the number of continental titles rose to 14. Zamalek won the 2024 CAF Super Cup, reaching their fifth title of the CAF Super Cup after winning Al Ahly 4–3 in a penalty shootout after a 1–1 draw at Kingdom Arena in Riyadh, Saudi Arabia, in the derby match often called the African Super of the 21st Century. In June 2025, Zamalek claimed the 2024–25 Egypt Cup after a dramatic 8–7 victory on penalties over Pyramids FC, following a 1–1 draw across 120 minutes.

== Stadium disasters ==
Helmy Zamora Stadium disaster 1974

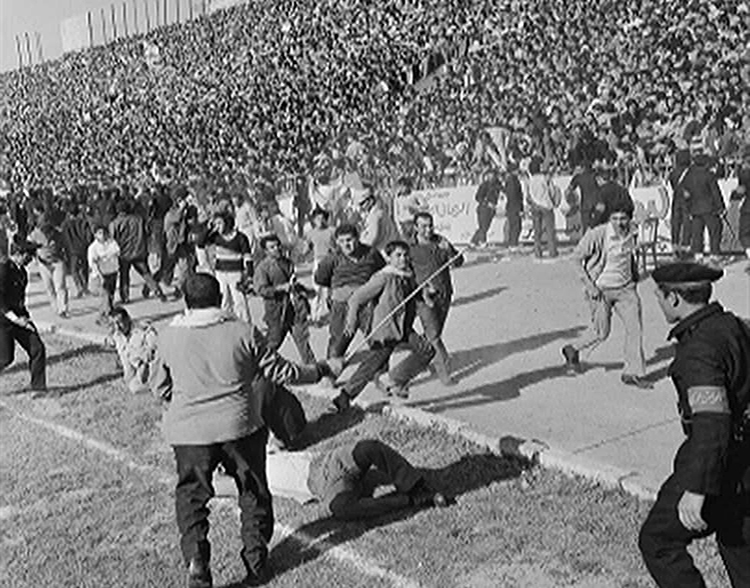
1974 Zamalek disaster

On February 17, 1974, at least forty-eight people died in a stampede at a friendly game against Czechoslovak club Dukla Prague at the Helmy Zamora Stadium.

30 June Stadium stampede 2015

Another tragedy took place on February 8, 2015, when twenty supporters were killed during a confrontation with police outside the 30 June Stadium.

== See also ==
- List of Zamalek SC records and statistics
- Football in Egypt
