= Ibrahim Yakan =

Egyptian footballer (born 1900)

Personal information
- Date of birth: 1900
- Position: Forward

Youth career
- Zamalek SC

Senior career*
Years	Team	Apps	(Gls)
1917–1926	Zamalek SC		

International career
1918–1925	Egypt		
- * Club domestic league appearances and goals

Ibrahim Yakan (born 1900, date of death unknown) was an Egyptian footballer. He competed in the men's tournament at the 1924 Summer Olympics.

== Honours ==
=== Zamalek ===
- Sultan Hussein Cup: 1921, 1922
- Egypt Cup: 1922
- Cairo League: 1922–23
- King Fouad Cup: 1925
