= 1930 Sultan Hussein Cup final =

1930 Sultan Hussein Cup Final
- Event: 1929–30 Sultan Hussein Cup
| Tersana | Zamalek SC |
| 1 | 0 |
- Date: 11 April 1930

1930 Sultan Hussein Cup Final, was the final match of the 1929–30 Sultan Hussein Cup, was between Tersana and Zamalek SC (El-Mokhtalat), Tersana won the match 1–0.

== Route to the final ==
| Tersana | | Round | Zamalek SC |
|---|---|---|---|---|
| Opponent | Result | 1929–30 Sultan Hussein Cup | Opponent | Result |
| | ? | First Round | El Menia | 2-0 |
| | ? | Quarterfinals | Ittihad | (W.O.)^{1} |
| | ? | Semifinals | Al Ahly | 3-1 |

^{1} Ithad Withdrew, Victory was awarded to Zamalek SC.

== Match details ==
11 April 1930

| Tersana | 1 – 0 | Zamalek SC |
|---|---|---|
| Shemais 52' | Report |

Tersana:
| GK | ? | (Egypt) Abd El-Aal |
| ? | ? | (Egypt) Ali El-Kaf |
| ? | ? | (Egypt) Zaki Osman |
| ? | ? | (Egypt) El-Sewaify |
| ? | ? | (Egypt) Moussa |
| ? | ? | (Egypt) Rihan |
| ? | ? | (Egypt) Ahmed Kholousi |
| ? | ? | (Egypt) Mansour |
| ? | ? | (Egypt) Kamel Abdullah "Andraus" |
| ? | ? | (Egypt) Ali Riadh |
| ? | ? | (Egypt) Mohamed Shemais |
Manager:

Zamalek SC:
| GK | ? | (Egypt) Mohamed Rostom |
| ? | ? | (Egypt) Mahmoud Salem |
| ? | ? | (Egypt) Ahmed Salem |
| ? | ? | (Egypt) Amin Sabry |
| ? | ? | (Egypt) Mokhtar Fawzy |
| ? | ? | (Egypt) Abd El-Halim Hassaan |
| ? | ? | (Egypt) Mohamed Latif |
| ? | ? | (Egypt) Mostafa Taha |
| ? | ? | (Egypt) Hussein Hegazi |
| ? | ? | (Egypt) Ramzy Barsoum |
| ? | ? | (Egypt) Labib Mahmoud |
Manager:

== See also ==
- Sultan Hussein Cup
