= 1922–23 El Mokhtalat Club season =

Al-Mokhtalat
1922–23 season
- Chairman: Mohamed Heidar Basha
- Cairo League: -
- Egypt Cup: First Round
- Sultan Cup: First Round

The 1922–23 season was Al-Mokhtalat SC's 12th season of football, since their formation in 1911.

== 1923 Egypt Cup ==
Round of 16	Al-Mokhtalat SC	1–1	Itthad

Round of 16-"Replay"	Al-Mokhtalat SC	1–2	Itthad

== 1923 Sultan Cup ==
19 January 1923 First Round	Al-Mokhtalat SC (Egypt)	1–1	(United Kingdom) Engine Repair Depot "British Aviation"
	Serri ?'		?'

14 February 1923 First Round- Replay	Al-Mokhtalat SC (Egypt)	1–1	(United Kingdom) Engine Repair Depot "British Aviation"
	Hegazi ?'		?'

6 March 1923 First Round-Replay	Al-Mokhtalat SC (Egypt)	1–2	(United Kingdom) Engine Repair Depot "British Aviation"
	Reyadh ?'		?'
