= Sayed Abaza =

Egyptian footballer (1897–1962)

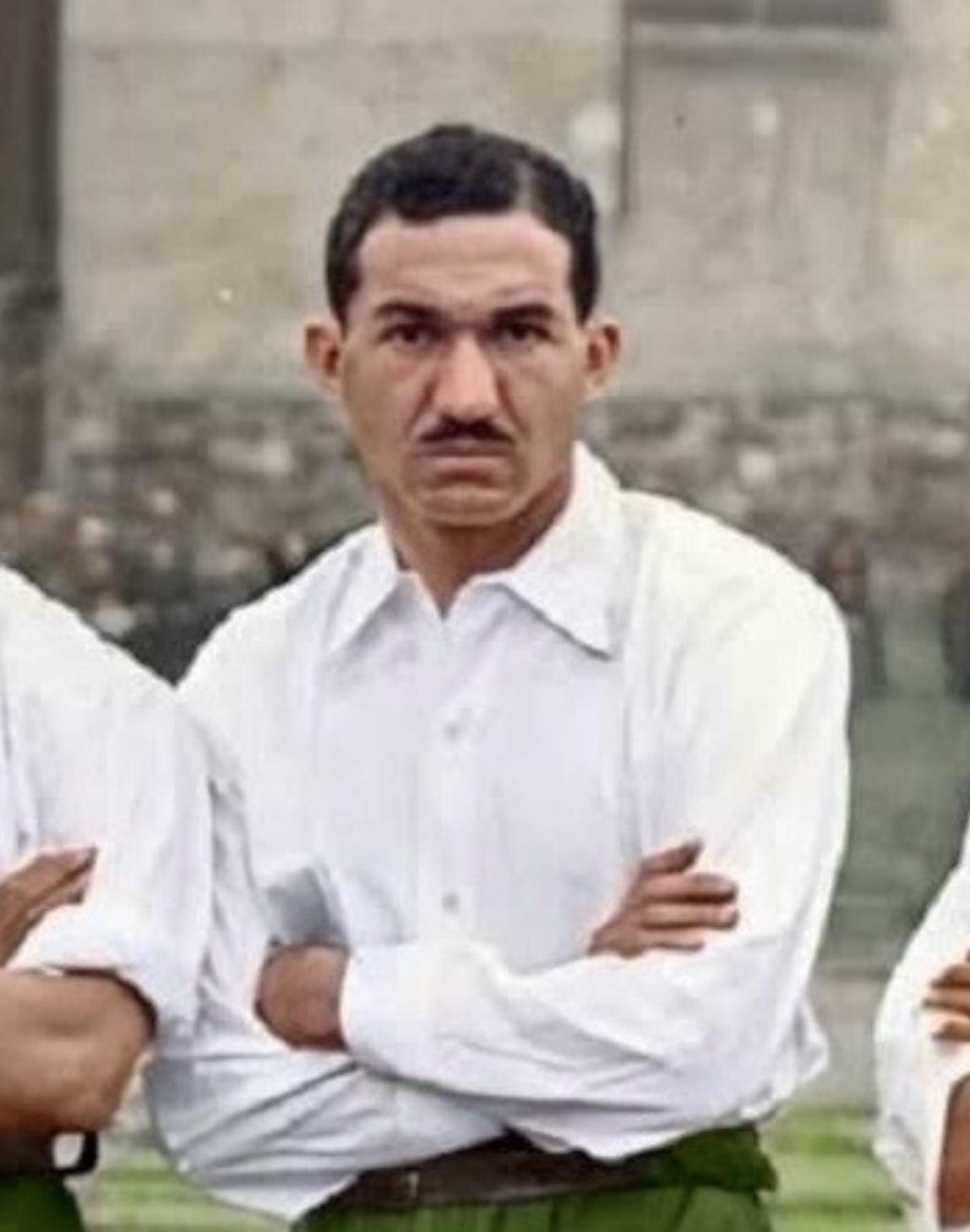
- Abaza with Egypt in the 1920 Olympics

Personal information
- Full name: El-Sayed Fahmi Abaza
- Date of birth: 1897
- Date of death: November 1962 (aged 64–65)

Senior career*
Years	Team	Apps	(Gls)
1915–1920	Al Ahly		
1920–1923	Zamalek SC		
1923–1928	Al Ahly		
1928–1930	Zamalek SC		
- * Club domestic league appearances and goals

El-Sayed Fahmi Abaza (1897 – November 1962) was an Egyptian footballer who played as a defender. He competed in the 1920 and 1928 Summer Olympics. He also played for Zamalek and won the Sultan Hussein Cup in 1921, and the first Egypt Cup in 1922.

== Career ==
=== Club career ===
Abaza started his football career with Al Ahly. In 1920, like most of his generation at the time, he moved to Zamalek and was a part of the team that won the Sultan Hussein Cup in 1921, where he scored a goal in the final. This team became the first Egyptian club to ever win a title.

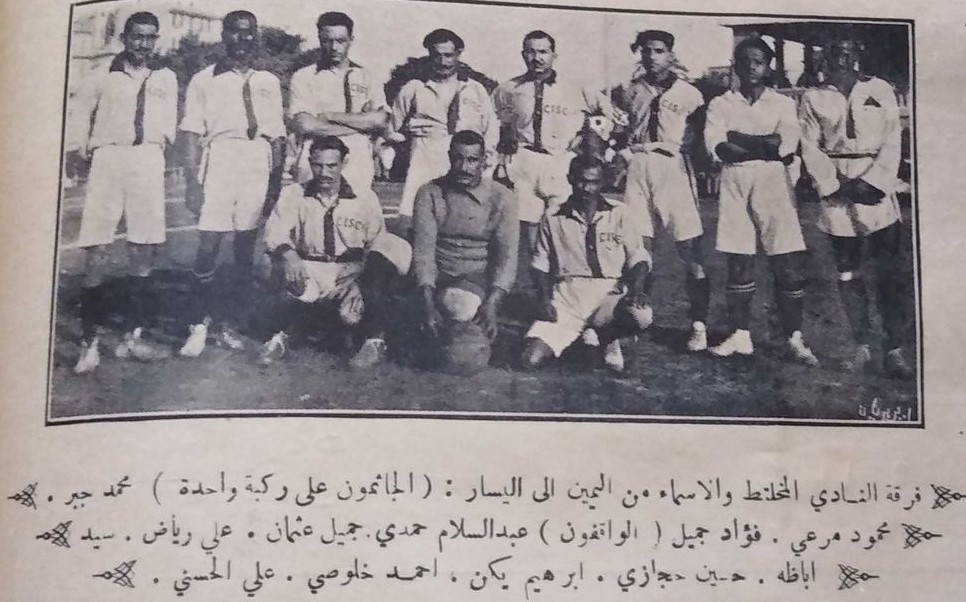
Abaza (fourth standing from right) with Zamalek in 1921

In 1922, he won with Zamalek the first Egypt Cup after winning Al-Ittihad 5–0 in the final, where he scored a goal in the final. He moved back to Al Ahly, and won with the team the Egypt Cup with in 1924 and 1925, as well as the Sultan Hussein Cup and the Cairo League in the 1925. He also won with Al Ahly the Sultan Hussein Cup in 1926 and 1927 and the Egypt Cup and Cairo League in 1927.

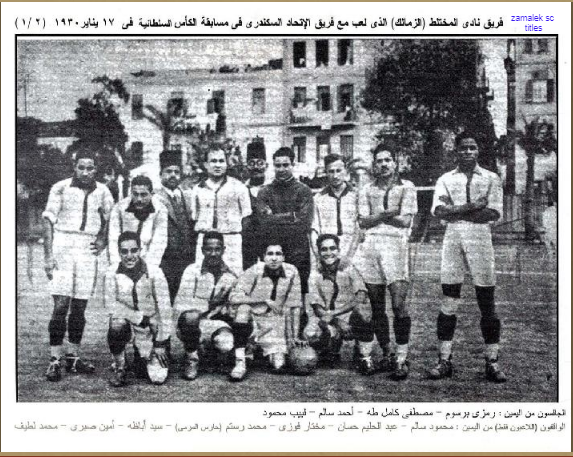
Abaza (fourth standing from left) with Zamalek in 1930

In 1928, he returned back again to Zamalek where he continued his career. He won with his team the 1928–29, 1929–30 Cairo League. After winning the 1929–30 Cairo League with Zamalek, he retired from football in 1930.

=== International career ===
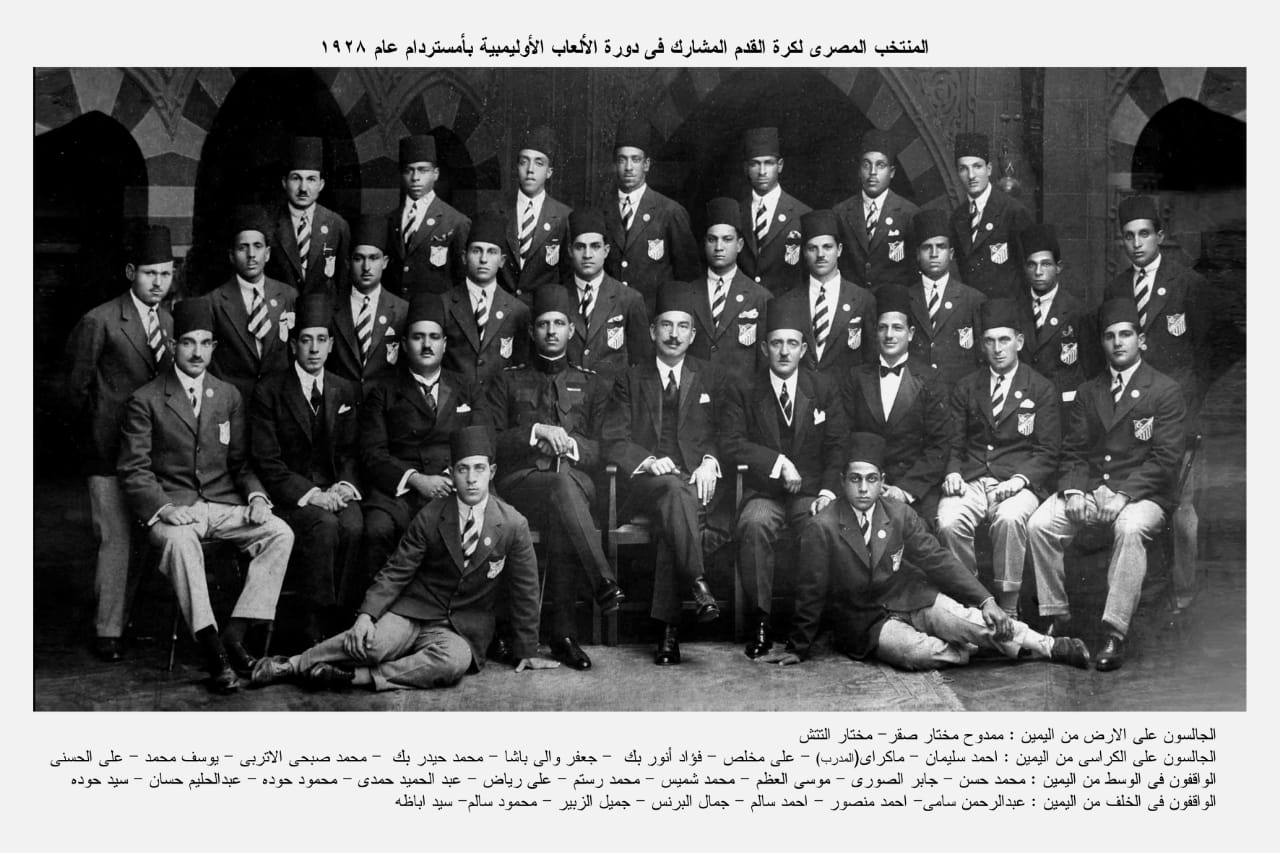
Abaza (back standing row, first from left) with Egypt in the 1928 Summer Olympics

He played for the Egypt national football team in the 1920 Summer Olympics in Antwerp. He was selected in the 1924 Summer Olympics in Paris. He was called for the third time to represent his country in the 1928 Summer Olympic in Amsterdam, where Egypt finished fourth.

== Honours ==
=== Zamalek ===
- Sultan Hussein Cup: 1921, 1922
- Egypt Cup: 1922
- Cairo League: 1922–23, 1928–29, 1929–30

=== Al Ahly ===
- Sultan Hussein Cup: 1925, 1926, 1927
- Egypt Cup: 1924, 1925, 1927
- Cairo League: 1924–25, 1926–27, 1927–28

=== Egypt ===
- Summer Olympics fourth place: 1928
