= Ali Riadh =

Egyptian footballer (1904-1978)

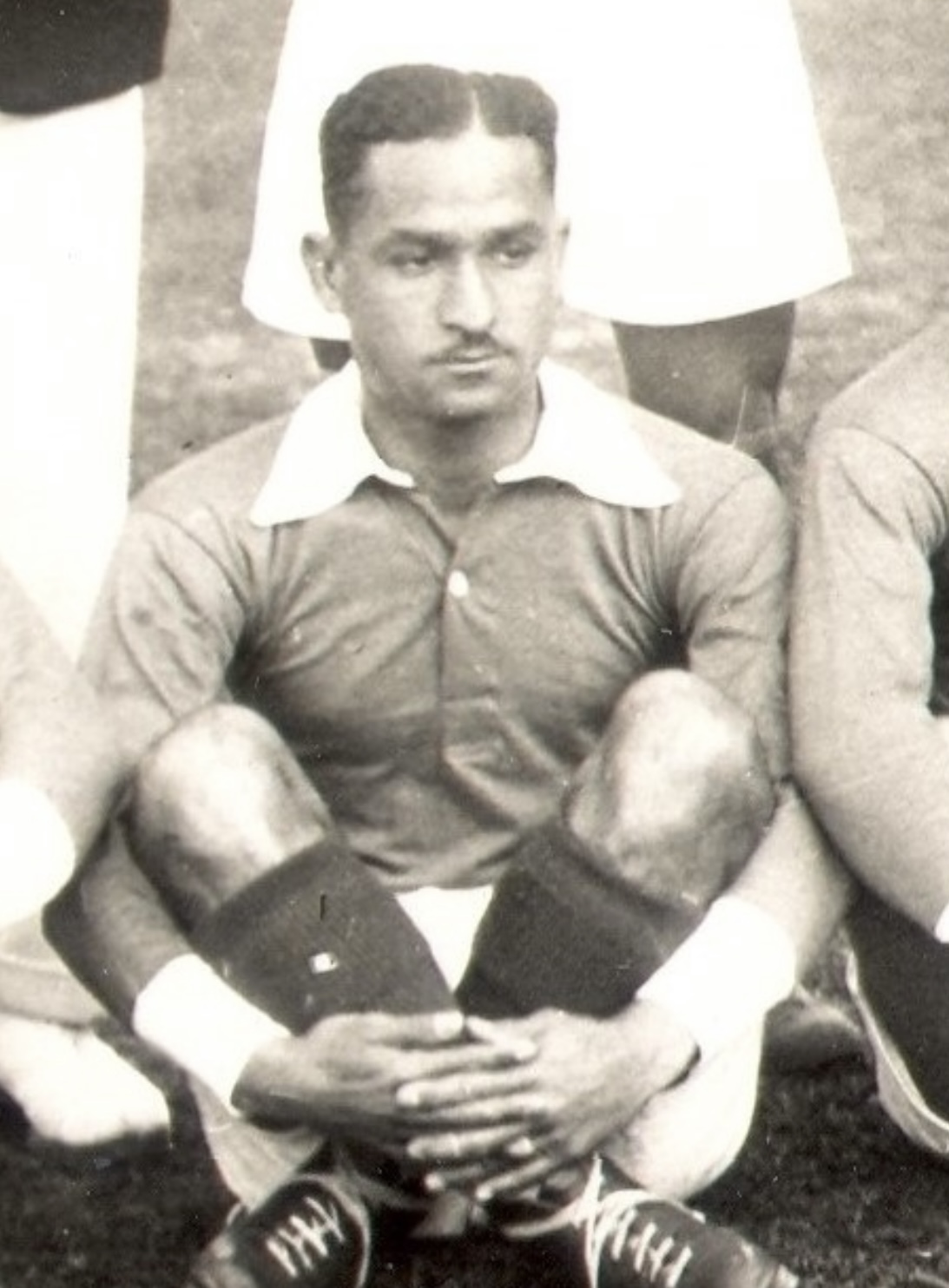
- Riadh with Egypt at the 1928 Olympic Games

Personal information
- Full name: Ali Mohamed Riadh
- Date of birth: 6 June 1904
- Date of death: 31 January 1978 (aged 73)
- Position: Forward

Youth career
- El Sekka

Senior career*
Years	Team	Apps	(Gls)
1920-1923	Zamalek		
1923-1925	El Sekka		
1925–1930	Al-Tersana		
1933–1935	Zamalek		

International career
1924-1932	Egypt	1	(0)
1924–1928	Egypt Olympic	6	(4)
- * Club domestic league appearances and goals

Ali Mohamed Riadh (6 June 1904 – 31 January 1978) was an Egyptian footballer who played as a forward. He played for Zamalek, and also represented Egypt as a forward at both the 1924 and 1928 Summer Olympics. He was part of the Zamalek squad that won the 1921 Sultan Hussein Cup, the first trophy in Egyptian football.

== Honours ==
Zamalek

- Egypt Cup: 1922, 1935
- Cairo League: 1922–23, 1933–34
- Sultan Hussein Cup: 1921, 1922
- King Fouad Cup: 1934

El Sekka

- Cairo League: 1923–24, 1925–26
- Sultan Hussein Cup: 1924

Tersana

- Egypt Cup: 1929
- Sultan Hussein Cup: 1928, 1930

Egypt

- Summer Olympics Fourth place: 1928
