= Mohamed Shemais =

Egyptian footballer (died 1976)

Personal information
- Date of death: 15 September 1976

International career
Years	Team	Apps	(Gls)
- Egypt

Mohamed Shemais (died 15 September 1976) was an Egyptian footballer. He competed in the men's tournament at the 1928 Summer Olympics.
