= Ali El-Hassani =

Egyptian footballer (1897–1976)

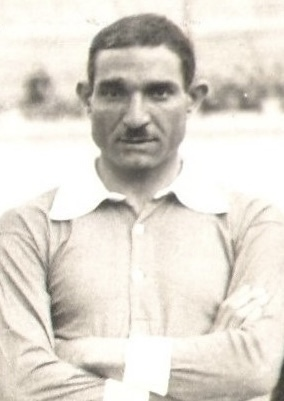
- El-Hassani with Egypt in the 1928 Olympic Games

Personal information
- Date of birth: January 1897
- Place of birth: Cairo, Egypt
- Date of death: 19 December 1976 (aged 79)

Youth career
- 1912–1914: Zamalek

Senior career*
Years	Team	Apps	(Gls)
1914-1923	Zamalek		
1924-1927	Al Ahly		
1927-1929	Zamalek		
1929-1931	Al Ahly		
1931-1934	Zamalek		
1934-1936	El Sekka El Hadid		

International career
1920-1928	Egypt		
- * Club domestic league appearances and goals

Ali El-Hassani (January 1897 – 19 December 1976) was an Egyptian footballer. He competed at the 1920, 1924 and 1928 Summer Olympics. He played for Zamalek and Al Ahly. He was part of the Zamalek team that won the Sultan Hussein Cup in 1921, the first title in Egyptian football.

== Honours and achievements ==
=== Club ===
Zamalek

- Sultan Hussein Cup: 1920–21, 1921–22
- Egypt Cup: 1921–22, 1931–32
- Cairo League: 1922–23, 1928–29, 1931–32, 1933–34
- King's Cup: 1933–34

Al Ahly

- Sultan Hussein Cup: 1924–25, 1925–26, 1926–27, 1930–31
- Egypt Cup: 1924–25, 1925–26, 1926–27, 1929–30, 1930–31
- Cairo League: 1924–25, 1926–27, 1930–31

El Sekka El Hadid

- Sultan Hussein Cup: 1935–36

=== International ===
Egypt

- Summer Olympics fourth place: 1928
