= 1921 Sultan Hussein Cup final =

1921 Sultan Hussein Cup Final
- Event: 1920–21 Sultan Hussein Cup
Zamalek	Sherwood Foresters (Great Britain)
(Egypt)	(United Kingdom)
2	1
- After extra time
- Date: 7 May 1921
- City: Cairo
- Referee: Yossef Mohammed

1921 Sultan Hussein Cup Final, was the final match of the 1920–21 Sultan Hussein Cup, was between Zamalek (El-Mokhtalat) and Sherwood Foresters from Great Britain, Zamalek won the match 2–1 after extra time (1–1 before extra time), became the 1st Egyptian team to win the cup.

== Route to the final ==
Zamalek		Round	Sherwood Foresters
Opponent	Result	1920–21 Sultan Hussein Cup	Opponent	Result
	?	First Round
	?	Quarterfinals		?
	?	Semifinals		?

== Match details ==
7 May 1921

Zamalek (Egypt)	2–1 (a.e.t.)	(United Kingdom) Sherwood Foresters
Abaza ?'; Hegazi ?'

Referee: Yossef Mohammed

Zamalek:
GK	?	(Egypt) Mahmoud Marei
?	?	(Egypt) Foad Gamil
?	?	(Egypt) Youssef Wahbi
?	?	(Egypt) Mohamed Gabr
?	?	(Egypt) Ali El-Hassani
?	?	(Egypt) Abdel Salam Hamdi
?	?	(Egypt) Gamil Osman
?	?	(Egypt) El-Sayed Abaza
?	?	(Egypt) Hussein Hegazi
?	?	(Egypt) Ali Riadh
?	?	(Egypt) Ahmed Kholousi
Manager:

Sherwood Foresters:
GK
?
?
?
?
?
?
?
?
?
?
Manager:

== See also ==
- Sultan Hussein Cup
