= Gamil Osman =

Egyptian footballer

Senior career*
Years	Team	Apps	(Gls)
- Zamalek
- El Sekka El Hadid

International career
1920–1924	Egypt		

Managerial career
- Al Ahly
- * Club domestic league appearances and goals

Gamil Osman was an Egyptian footballer. He competed in the men's tournament at the 1920 Summer Olympics. He played for Zamalek, and was a part of the team that won the 1921 Sultan Hussein Cup, and the 1922 Egypt Cup.

== Honours ==
=== Zamalek ===
- Sultan Hussein Cup: 1921, 1922
- Egypt Cup: 1922
- Cairo League: 1922–23
