= 1922 Egypt Cup final =

- Event: 1921–22 Egypt Cup
Zamalek	Al Ittihad Alexandria
5	0
- Date: 21 April 1922

The 1922 Egypt Cup final, was the final match of the 1921–22 Egypt Cup and the 1st Egypt cup final, was between Zamalek (El-Mokhtalat) and Al Ittihad Alexandria. Zamalek won the match 5–0, and became the 1st team to win the Egypt Cup.

== Route to the final ==
Zamalek		Round	Al Ittihad Alexandria
Opponent	Result	1921–22 Egypt Cup	Opponent	Result
Tersana	4–0	First Round		?
Government Employee Club	3–0	Quarterfinals	Al Ahly	?
Schools Team	3–0	Semifinals	Abasiya	?

== Match details ==
21 April 1922

Zamalek	5 – 0	Al Ittihad Alexandria
Osman ?'; Abaza ?'; Hegazi ?'; Riadh ?', ?'	Report

Zamalek:
GK	?	(Egypt) Mahmoud Marei
?	?	(Egypt) Foad Gamil
?	?	(Egypt) Youssef Wahbi
?	?	(Egypt) Mohamed Gabr
?	?	(Egypt) Ali El-Hassani
?	?	(Egypt) Abdel Salam Hamdi
?	?	(Egypt) El-Sayed Abaza
?	?	(Egypt) Ali Riadh
?	?	(Egypt) Hussein Hegazi
?	?	(Egypt) Youssef Mohamed
?	?	(Egypt) Gamil Osman
Manager:

Al Ittihad Alexandria:
GK	?	(Egypt) Zaki Shaaban "El-Shel"
?	?	(Egypt) Hassan El-Deeb
?	?	(Egypt) Hassan Fares
?	?	(Egypt) Foad Naguib
?	?	(Egypt) El-Sukkary
?	?	(Egypt) Hussein Moussai
?	?	(Egypt) Mahmoud Houda
?	?	(Egypt) Ibrahim Merghani
?	?	(Egypt) El-Sayed Habashi
?	?	(Egypt) Magdi El-Deeb
?	?	(Egypt) El-Sayed Houda
Manager:
