= Hussein Hegazi =

Egyptian footballer (1889–1961)

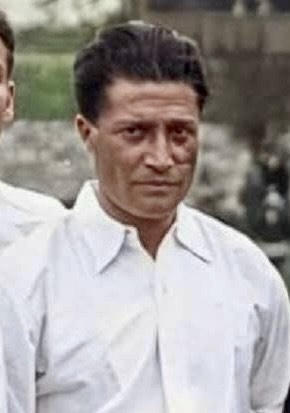
- Hegazi with Egypt at the 1920 Olympic Games

Personal information
- Date of birth: 14 September 1889
- Place of birth: Cairo, Khedivate of Egypt
- Date of death: 8 October 1961 (aged 72)
- Place of death: Cairo, Egypt
- Position: Striker

Senior career*
Years	Team	Apps	(Gls)
1911	Dulwich Hamlet		
1911	Fulham	1	(1)
1911–1914	Dulwich Hamlet		
1914–1915	Sekka		
1915–1919	Al Ahly		
1919–1924	Zamalek		
1924–1928	Al Ahly		
1928–1931	Zamalek		

International career
1916–1930	Egypt		
- * Club domestic league appearances and goals

Hussein Hegazi (Arabic: حسين حجازي; 14 September 1889 – 8 October 1961) was an Egyptian international footballer. He is considered the father of Egyptian football. Hegazi played in England at the prime of his career. He spent most of his professional career in Zamalek, where he was a part of the team that won the Sultan Hussein Cup in 1921, becoming the first Egyptian club in history to win a tournament.

He also played for the Egypt national football team in their first match in 1916. With the Egypt national football team, he was in the first team created to represent the country in 1916. He participated with Egypt at the 1920 Summer Olympics in Antwerp and the 1924 Summer Olympics in Paris.

== Biography ==
He became the first African player to play in England after playing with Dulwich Hamlet and Fulham in 1911. In his only Football League appearance for Fulham, he scored one goal. His debut with Fulham was against Stockport County was spectacular, he scored within fifteen minutes and the Athletic News paid him the following compliment in verse:

Fulham was proud of her player from Cairo
Fulham was just like a dog with two tails –
Dulwich, you'll find in a terrible ire-o,
If for high amateur honour she fails.
But at such prospect all Dulwichites smile,
Backing the luck of this lad from the Nile.

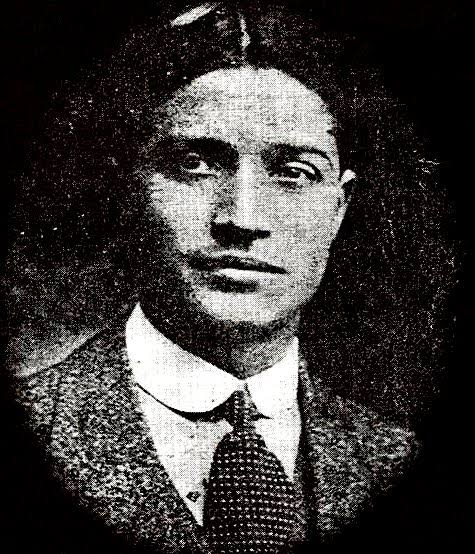
Hegazi in 1919

Despite such praise this was to be Hegazi's only match for Fulham as he returned to play for Dulwich Hamlet the next week. His performances for Hamlet brought him to the attention of the London County selectors and he made the first of his five representative appearances for the team against Middlesex in December 1911. In 1913 he was admitted to the University of Cambridge's St Catharine's College; he withdrew from his course after just two terms. In the short time he attended the University he was chosen to play in the Varsity match against Oxford. Playing alongside fellow Olympian Max Woosnam, he played well as Cambridge defeated Oxford by a score of 2–1.

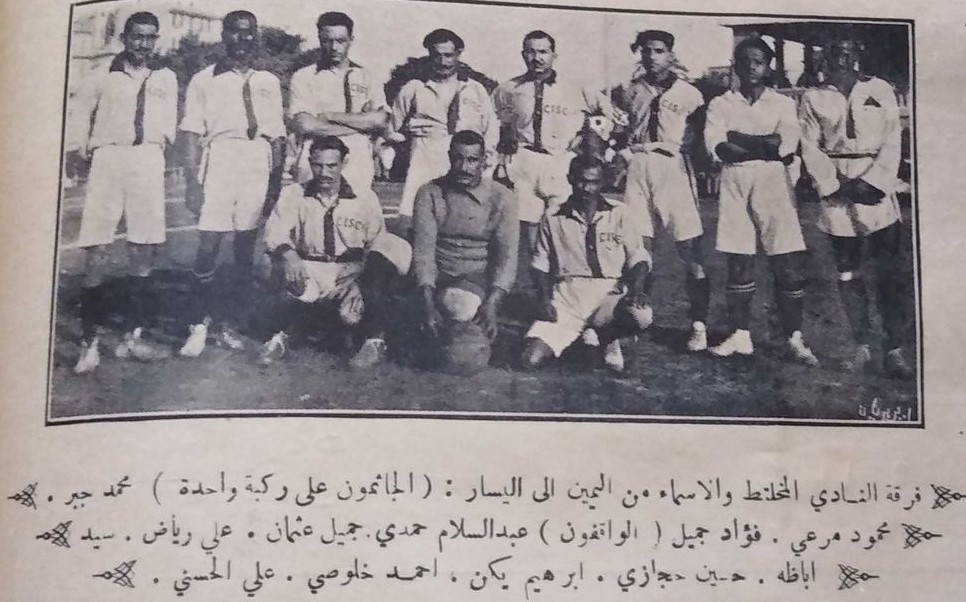
Hegazi (fifth standing from right) with Zamalek SC team in 1921

After returning to Egypt in 1914, Hegazi joined Al Ahly in 1915, spent four years at Al Ahly. He then joined their rivals Zamalek in 1919, where he was a part of Zamalek SC team that won the Sultan Hussein Cup in 1921, becoming the first Egyptian team to ever win a title. In 1922, he won with his team the Sultan Hussein Cup for the second time in a row.

In 1922, Hegazi won the first Egypt Cup playing with Zamalek. In his second spell with Zamalek, he won the Cairo League for two seasons in (1929–30, 1931–32). He also won with Zamalek the King's Cup in 1924–25. In his spell with Al Ahly, he won the 1929 Sultan Hussein Cup. Hegazi also played for Sekka in the beginning of his career in Egypt.

With the Egypt national football team, he was in the first team created to represent the country in 1916. He participated with Egypt at the 1920 Summer Olympics in Antwerp and the 1924 Summer Olympics in Paris.

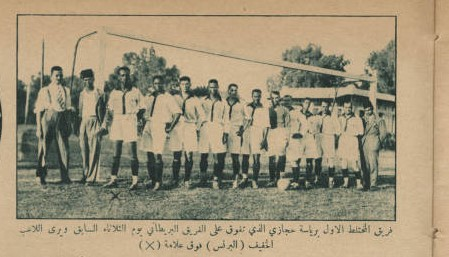
Hegazi (second from right) with Zamalek in 1928

Hegazi called for the establishment of the Egyptian Football Association, and contributed to it. He was a member of the first board of directors of the Football Association under the chairmanship of Gaafar Wali Pasha. At that time, Hegazi was a player in the Egyptian national team, a captain of the national and Olympic teams, a coach in the technical staff, and a member of the Board of Directors of the Football Association, and a member of the Technical Committee of the Egyptian Football Association.

He is called the "Father of Egyptian Football", he is credited of introducing the game to Egyptians. He helped various football clubs and his country's national team in several roles. Hegazi died at age of 72 on 8 October 1961 in Cairo. A street in Cairo is named after him.
