= Sultan Hussein Cup =

Defunct Association football competition in Egypt

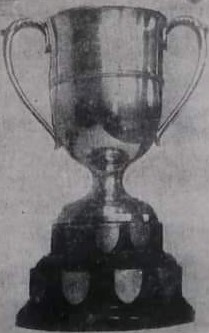
- Organiser(s): Egyptian-English Society (1916–1922) Egyptian Football Association (1922–1938)
- Founded: 1916
- Abolished: 1938
- Region: Egypt
- Domestic cup: Egypt Cup
- Last champions: Al Ahly (7th title)
- Most championships: Al Ahly (7 titles)

The Sultan Hussein Cup (1917–1938) was the first local Egyptian football competition. It preceded the Egypt Cup and the regional leagues in the areas of Cairo, Alexandria, Bahary and Canal. The first Egyptian team to win the trophy was Zamalek SC, in the 1921 edition.

== History ==
In 1916, the idea of establishing a football league in the Sultanate of Egypt was proposed. The league would include Egyptian teams and teams from the allies' military clubs, including the British. The competition was named after Sultan Hussein Kamel.

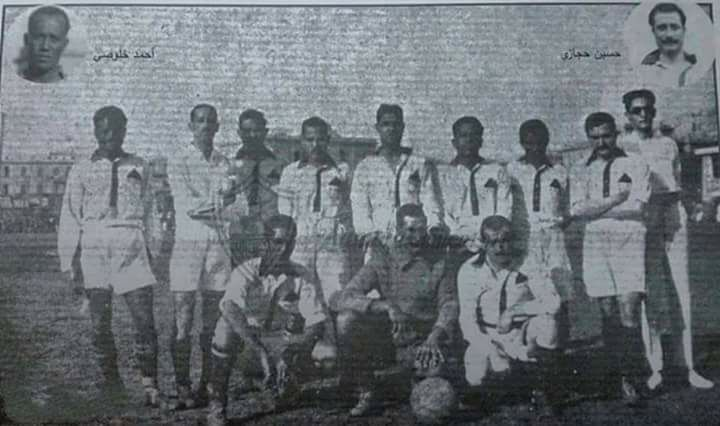
Zamalek team, winners of the first Sultan Hussein Cup in 1921, becoming the first Egyptian team to ever win a tournament

Zamalek was the only Egyptian club to participate in the championship as a sign of resistance to the British and a way to display the Egyptian presence in the sport. Zamalek reached the final of the 1917 edition and eventually won the cup in 1920–21. This encouraged other Egyptian clubs to participate including Al Ahly which initially refused to take part, but in 1918, they decided to take part.

== List of Champions ==
Year	Champion
1916–17	GHQ Signals
1917–18	MGC Base Depot
1918–19	Infantry Base Depot
1919–20	Sherwood Foresters
1920–21	Zamalek
1921–22	Zamalek
1922–23	Al Ahly
1923–24	El Sekka El Hadid
1924–25	Al Ahly
1925–26	Al Ahly
1926–27	Al Ahly
1927–28	Tersana
1928–29	Al Ahly
1929–30	Tersana
1930–31	Al Ahly
1931–32	Port Fouad SC
1932–33	Al Masry
1933–34	Al Masry
1934–35	Ittihad
1935–36	El Sekka El Hadid
1936–37	Al Masry
1937–38	Al Ahly

== Performances ==
Team	Titles	Winning years
Al Ahly	7	1922–23, 1924–25, 1925–26, 1926–27, 1928–29, 1930–31, 1937–38
Al Masry	3	1932–33, 1933–34, 1936–37
Zamalek	2	1920–21, 1921–22
Tersana	2	1927–28, 1929–30
Al Ittihad	1	1934–35

== See also ==
- Egypt Cup
- King's Cup
