= Mohamed Kabil =

Egyptian footballer (1927–2023)

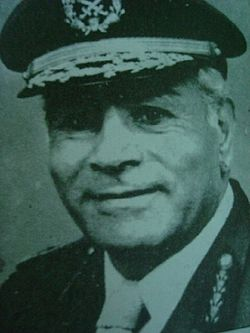

Personal information
- Full name: Abdel Aziz Mohamed Kabil
- Date of birth: 14 March 1927
- Place of birth: Al Azizeyah, Al-Sharqiyah, Egypt
- Date of death: 11 October 2023 (aged 96)
- Position: Midfielder

Senior career*
Years	Team	Apps	(Gls)
1948-1954	Zamalek		

International career
1949-1954	Egypt		
- * Club domestic league appearances and goals

Abdel Aziz Mohamed Kabil (14 March 1927 – 11 October 2023), known as Mohamed Kabil, was an Egyptian footballer who played as a midfielder. He competed in the men's tournament at the 1952 Summer Olympics. Kabil died on 11 October 2023, at the age of 96.

== Football career ==
Kabil's career as a professional footballer began with Zamalek in 1948, he played in the Cairo League, won the 1948–49 title in his first season with the club. He also played in the first season of the newly launched Egyptian Premier League. At that time, the Zamalek young player was playing in the Al Ahly youth team. In one of the matches, Helmy Zamora watched him and was impressed by his capabilities. He conveyed his admiration to Mohammed Haidar Pasha, who was Zamalek's president at the time. Haider Pasha asked to meet Kabil, who accepted the invitation and went to meet the Pasha, Kabil or anyone else could not refuse, especially that Kabil was actually a Zamalek fan. Indeed, he left Al Ahly and signed for Zamalek, and Haider Pasha asked him to join the Military Academy without worrying about anything. Kabil agreed and his family was the last to know about this major change in his future.

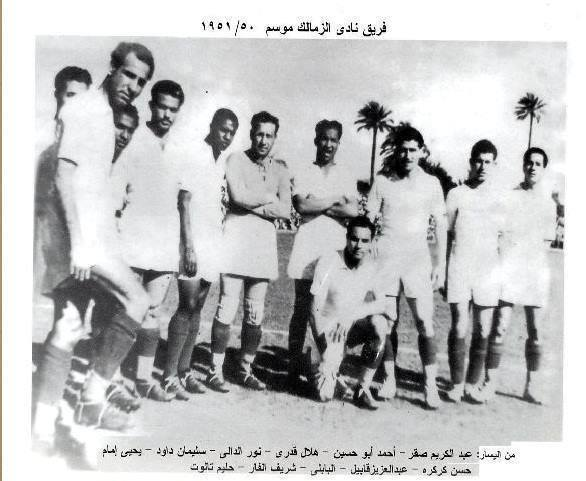
Kabil (fourth from right) with Zamalek in 1951

Kabil played for the first team of Zamalek in the same year he moved from Al Ahly. He spent 7 years with the Cairo giants. Unfortunately, he was haunted by the feeling that football could destroy his military future, which he was keen on. The military spectrum also used to call the officer who practices football in any club a "football officer".

In 1954, Kabil went to Lieutenant general Abdel Aziz Mustafa, who was the director of the armored vehicles at that time, and asked him to transfer him to a place far from Cairo. In fact, he went to Suez, he played for Zamalek from 1948 to 1954, and he retired from professional football. One of Kabil's memories of football, which he will never forget, is the 1952 Egypt Cup final, after Zamalek defeated Al Ahly with a score of 2–0, scored by Sharif El-Far, and the reward for the cup was a trip to Syria and Lebanon. The reward for winning matches in Kabil's era ranged from 25 to 50 Piastres, despite the small amount of money, the players were happy with the amount because it had great value for them. As for the largest amount that Kabil received from the Zamalek club, it was 200 Egyptian pounds. This year, Al Ahly officials tried to bring him back to the team. Mukhtar El-Tetch spoke to him about this matter, but he refused, and when Zamalek learned of these attempts, they gave Kabil 200 Egyptian pounds in appreciation for his loyalty.

Kabil’s generation famous players in the history of Egyptian football such as; Essam Baheeg, Alaa El-Hamouli, Nour El-Dali, Sharif El-Far, and Ali Sharaf. He briefly played with the generation that preceded his, such as Yehya Imam, Zoklot, Omar Shendi, Galal Kuraitem, and Hanafy Bastan.

== Honours ==
Zamalek

- Egypt Cup: 1951–52
- Cairo League: 1948–49, 1950-51, 1951-52, 1952-53
