= Zamalek SC league record by opponent =

Zamalek Sporting Club is an Egyptian sporting club based in Meet Okba, Giza, which is currently competes in 2020–21 Egyptian Premier League. The club was formed in 1911 by George Marzbach as Qasr El-Nil.

The team that Zamalek have met the most in Egyptian Premier League is El Ittihad with 110 matches. El-Zamalek have won 68 of the league matches against El Itthad, which represents the most Zamalek have won against any team. El-Zamalek have drawn more matches with Al Ahly SC more than any other team.

== Key ==
- The records include the result of matches that were in canceled seasons (1954–55, 1971–72, 1973–74, 1989–90, 2011–12 and 2012–13).
- P = matches played; W = matches won; D = matches drawn; L = Matches lost; Win% = percentage of total matches won; GS = goals scored; GA = goals against.
- Cairo Zone League matches are excluded.
- Results against each opponent include results against that team under any former name. For example; results against Shobra El-Kheima include matches played against Plastic.
- † Teams with this background and symbol in the "Team" column are current divisional rivals of Zamalek.

== All-time league record ==
As of 15 July 2015

Zamalek SC league record by opponent
Team	P	W	D	L	Win%	GS	GA
Ala'ab Damanhour †	10	7	3	0	70.00	19	5
Al Ahly SC †	109	25	46	38	22.94	98	133
Al-Masry SC †	108	63	27	18	58.33	179	79
Alassiouty Sport †	2	2	0	0	100.00	5	0
Al-Sekka Al-Hadid	44	32	10	2	72.73	100	21
Aluminium Nag Hammâdi	10	7	3	0	70.00	26	10
Assiut Cement	4	2	1	1	50.00	6	4
Asyut Petroleum	6	3	2	1	50.00	11	7
Aswan SC	14	10	4	0	71.43	38	9
Bahareya	2	2	0	0	100.00	6	2
Baladiat El-Mahala	24	14	10	0	58.33	29	16
Belquas	2	2	0	0	100.00	4	0
Beni Suef	6	6	0	0	100.00	20	1
Beni Suef Telecom	3	2	1	0	66.67	4	1
Dakhleya †	5	4	1	0	80.00	7	2
Domiat	13	9	3	1	69.23	29	9
ENPPI †	21	10	8	3	47.62	28	16
Esco	12	12	0	0	100.00	28	6
Etisalat	4	2	1	1	50.00	10	6
El-Intag El-Harby	7	6	1	0	85.71	15	5
El-Ittihad †	110	68	30	12	61.82	186	70
El-Gaish †	19	9	6	4	47.37	33	19
El Gouna FC †	7	3	3	1	42.86	8	5
El-Olympi	78	46	17	15	58.97	140	68
El Mansoura SC	55	37	14	4	67.27	88	28
El Mokawloon SC †	64	41	16	7	64.06	92	39
El-Nasr †	2	2	0	0	100.00	7	1
El-Quanah	57	28	18	11	49.12	78	38
El Raja Marsa Matruh †	2	2	0	0	100.00	5	2
El-Sharquia	6	5	0	1	83.33	14	6
El Shams	2	2	0	0	100.00	8	1
Factory 36	4	4	0	0	100.00	7	0
Ghazl El Mahalla SC	91	54	25	12	59.34	133	50
Ghazl Domiat	10	7	3	0	70.00	14	3
Ghazl Suez	4	3	1	0	75.00	10	6
Goldi	8	7	1	0	87.50	18	6
Gomhuriat Shebeen	13	10	2	1	76.92	29	4
Gut Belbais	2	2	0	0	100.00	6	0
Gomhuriat Shebeen	13	10	2	1	76.92	29	4
Haras El-Hodood SC †	26	11	6	9	42.31	37	33
Ismaily SC †	104	46	30	28	44.23	131	109
Ittihad El-Shorta †	13	8	3	2	61.54	26	14
Ittihad Osman	12	8	2	2	66.67	22	10
Ittihad Suez	18	12	5	1	66.67	33	10
Kafr el-Sheikh	2	1	1	0	50.00	3	1
Koroum	22	18	3	1	81.82	53	12
Misr El-Makasa SC †	4	2	0	2	50.00	8	7
Maleyat Kafr El-Zayyat	4	3	1	0	75.00	7	1
Mareekh	17	12	4	1	70.59	31	6
Naseeg Helwan	2	2	0	0	100.00	11	0
Petrojet FC †	18	9	4	5	50.00	29	22
Port Foad	12	9	2	1	75.00	21	6
Smouha †	6	5	0	1	83.33	11	3
Shobra El-Kheima	17	15	2	0	88.24	38	5
Sohag	4	2	2	0	50.00	10	6
Suez Cement	8	5	1	2	62.50	18	11
Suez Club	8	5	2	1	62.50	15	7
Suez Montakhab	32	22	8	2	68.75	54	14
Suez Petroleum	2	2	0	0	100.00	6	1
Taiaran	13	9	1	3	69.23	38	10
Tanta	20	18	1	1	90.00	51	9
Teram	18	14	3	1	77.78	42	13
Tersana SC	91	61	19	11	67.03	167	65
Wadi Degla FC †	6	3	3	0	50.00	9	5
Younan Alexandria	4	2	1	1	50.00	9	6
