= Galal Ibrahim =

Egyptian sports executive (died 2021)

- جلال إبراهيم

18th President of Zamalek SC
- In office 1992–1996
- Preceded by: Nour El-Dali
- Succeeded by: Kamal Darwish

28th President of Zamalek SC
- In office 2010–2011
- Preceded by: Mamdouh Abbas
- Succeeded by: Mamdouh Abbas

Personal details
- Born: Galal Ibrahim; 9 March 1942 Port Said, Egypt
- Died: 25 November 2021 Cairo, Egypt
- Occupation: Judge • Sports Executive

Galal Ibrahim ( 9 March 1942 – 25 November 2021) was a two-time president of Cairo-based football club Zamalek SC.

He worked with the judiciary as a consultant and served as head of the Criminal Court. He headed Zamalek SC from 1992 to 1996, and took over the presidency of the club for a second time in 2010 after the invalidation of the May 2009 election, which Mamdouh Abbas won. However, Ibrahim resigned in August 2011 due to financial stress.
