= Mamdouh Abbas =

Egyptian businessman

- ممدوح عباس
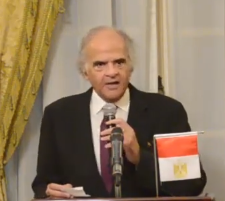

25th President of Zamalek SC
- In office August 2006 – November 2008
- Preceded by: Raouf Gasser
- Succeeded by: Mohamed Amer

27th President of Zamalek SC
- In office May 2009 – September 2010
- Preceded by: Mohamed Amer
- Succeeded by: Galal Ibrahim

29th President of Zamalek SC
- In office December 2011 – May 2013
- Preceded by: Galal Ibrahim
- Succeeded by: Kamal Darwish

Personal details
- Born: Mamdouh Mohamed Fathy Abbas; 1946 (age 79–80) Dakahlia

Mamdouh Abbas (born 1946) is an Egyptian businessman. He was appointed the Zamalek chairman twice. His first appointment stretched from 2006 to 2008. He returned to the position for the second time when he was elected president of the club in May 2009. He resigned from Zamalek in early November over a contract dispute. He managed a wide range of business companies in which their capital ranged between 80 and US$200 million.

Currently he's the Chairman of Intro Group, the holding company for various companies working in such sectors as oil and gas, energy, real estate.

== Biography ==
Mamdouh Abbas graduated from the Faculty of Economics and Political Science, Cairo University in 1967, began his career as an employee of the Nasr Company for Export and Import, then turned to free work and established his first company in 1980, through which he worked in the field of trade, before developing his activities to include the fields of petroleum and information technology.

== Administrative positions ==
He is the owner of the Advanced Petroleum Services Company "ADES", a founding partner of Intro Group, a partner in Compass Capital, director of the TBS Holding Company, and chairman of the board of directors of the 10th of Ramadan Company for Pharmaceutical and Personal Preparations "Rameda". He is also a member of the American Chamber of Commerce in Egypt.

== Social work ==
Mamdouh Abbas founded the Kemet Boutros Boutros-Ghali Foundation for Peace and Knowledge with others and assumed the presidency of the board of trustees in 2018. He held the position of treasurer of the Egyptian Football Association, as well as the treasurer of Zamalek SC.

== Presidency of Zamalek SC ==
=== First term (August 2006 - November 2008) ===
On 9 August 2006, the National Sports Council in Egypt decided to dissolve the Zamalek Club Board of Directors headed by Mortada Mansour and appoint a temporary council to manage the club's affairs for a period of one year. The decision included appointing Mamdouh Abbas as president of the Zamalek club, Hazem Abdel-Rahman Fawzi as vice-president, and Yahya Mustafa Kamal Helmy as treasurer. But the council's administration continued until 2008, after its extension.

During this term, the first football team won the 2007/08 Egypt Cup.

=== Second period (May 2009 - September 2010) ===
The Zamalek club presidency elections were held, during which Mortada Mansour and Mamdouh Abbas competed, and ended with Abbas winning the presidency of Zamalek Club, but Mansour insisted that the elections were rigged and rejected their results.

=== Completion of the second period (December 2011 - May 2013) ===
On 20 December 2011, the Supreme Administrative Court decided to return Mamdouh Abbas to head the Zamalek club again after the end of his rivalry with Mortada Mansour, and in May 2013, Abbas's term ended, which prompted the Ministry of Sports to issue a decision to extend the council's work until the next elections in order to preserve the club's stability.
