= Kamal Darwish =

- كمال درويش

19th President of Zamalek SC
- In office 1996–2005
- Preceded by: Galal Ibrahim
- Succeeded by: Mortada Mansour

30th President of Zamalek SC
- In office 2013–2014
- Preceded by: Mamdouh Abbas
- Succeeded by: Mortada Mansour

Personal details
- Born: Kamal Darwish; 9 March 1942 Port Said, Egypt

Kamal Darwish (Arabic: كمال درويش; born 9 March 1942, in Port Said), the former president of Zamalek SC, took office for the club in the period from 1996 to 2001, and was re-elected for a second term from 2001 to 2005.

He is considered one of the symbols of Zamalek handball team, where he led the club to win the championships in the seventies and early eighties in what is known as Golden generation. Darwish served as President of the Egyptian federation of boxing. He also served as Dean of the Faculty of Physical Education previously, also candidate for Egyptian Football Association for president in 2009 but lost in favor of Samir Zaher. He took over the presidency of Zamalek in October 2013 after being assigned by Taher Abouzeid the former Minister of Sports.
