= List of Zamalek SC presidents =

Zamalek Sporting Club (Arabic: نادي الزمالك الرياضي), commonly referred to as Zamalek, is an Egyptian sports club based in Cairo, Egypt. The club is mainly known for its professional football team, which currently plays in the Egyptian Premier League, the top tier of the Egyptian football league system. Since the foundation of the club in 1911, 22 different presidents ran the club. The first president of Zamalek SC is George Merzbach Bey, who is also the founder of the club. The longest-running president in the history of Zamalek SC is Mohammed Haidar Pasha.

== List of presidents ==
Below is the presidential history of Zamalek SC until the present day.

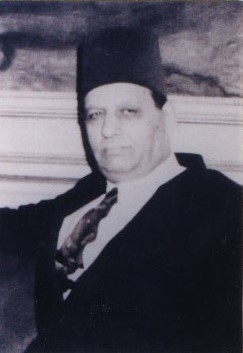
Mohammed Haidar Pasha, the longest-running president in the history of Zamalek SC

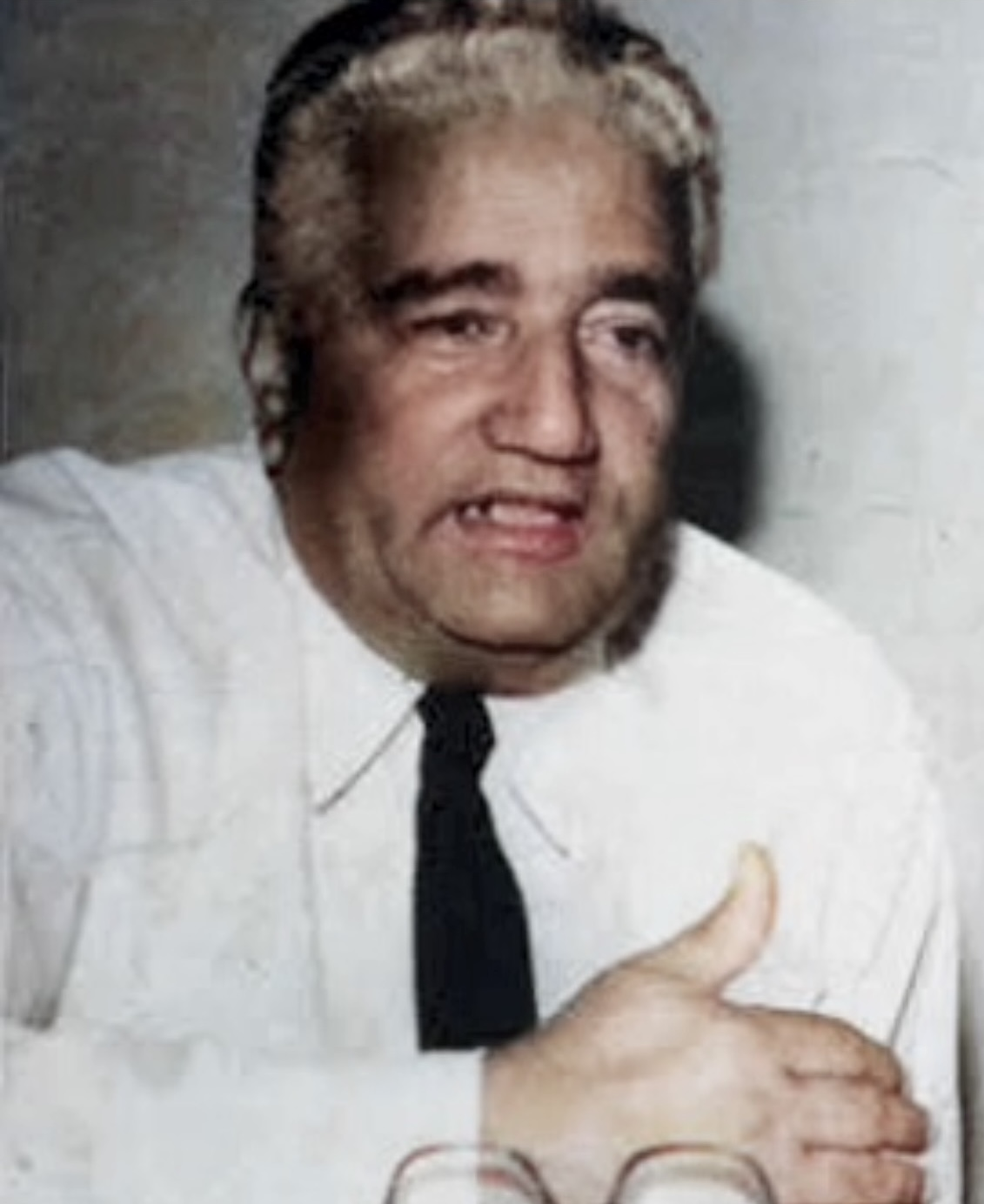
Helmy Zamora, the first footballer to become a club's president in Egypt and the second longest-running president

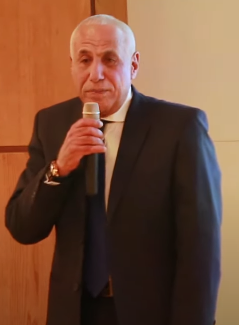
Hussein Labib, Current president of Zamalek SC

Zamalek Sporting Club Presidents
No.	Period	Name	From	To
1	1st	(Germany) Henry Kramer	1911	1912
2	1st	(France) Antoine Bianchi	1912	1917
3	1st	(Egypt) Dr. Mohammed Badr	1917	1917
4	2nd	(France) Antoine Bianchi	1917	1922
5	1st	(Belgium) George Merzbach Bey	1922	1927
6	1st	(Egypt) Mohammed Haidar Pasha	1927	1928
7	1st	(Egypt) Prince Omar Ibrahim Halim	1928	1928
8	1st	(Egypt) Prince Abbas Halim	1928	1928
9	2nd	(Egypt) Prince Omar Ibrahim Halim	1928	1930
10	1st	(Egypt) Mohammed Haidar Pasha	1927	1928
11	1st	(Egypt) Mahmoud Shawki	1952	1955
12	1st	(Egypt) Abdel Hamid El-Shawarbi	1955	1955
13	2nd	(Egypt) Mahmoud Shawki	1955	1956
14	1st	(Egypt) (Egypt) Abdel-Latif Abu-Rajelha	1956	1961
15	1st	(Egypt) Elwi El-Gazzar	1961	1962
16	1st	(Egypt) Hassan Amer	1962	1967
17	1st	(Egypt) Helmy Zamora	1967	1971
18	1st	(Egypt) (Egypt) Tawfik El-Kheshin	1971	1972
19	2nd	(Egypt) Helmy Zamora	1974	1980
20	3rd	(Egypt) (Egypt) Helmy Zamora	1980	1984
21	2nd	(Egypt) Hassan Amer	1984	1988
22	1st	(Egypt) Hassan Abou El Fotouh	1988	1990
23	1st	(Egypt) Nour El-Dali	1990	1992
24	1st	(Egypt) Galal Ibrahim	1992	1996
25	1st	(Egypt) Kamal Darwish	1996	2001
26	2nd	(Egypt) Kamal Darwish	2001	2005
27	1st	(Egypt) Mortada Mansour	2005	2005
28	1st	(Egypt) Morsi Atallah	2005	2006
29	2nd	(Egypt) Mortada Mansour	2006	2006
30	1st	(Egypt) Raouff Gasser	2006	2006
31	1st	(Egypt) Mamdouh Abbas	2006	2008
32	1st	(Egypt) Mohamed Amer	2008	2009
33	2nd	(Egypt) Mamdouh Abbas	2009	2010
34	2nd	(Egypt) Galal Ibrahim	2010	2011
35	3rd	(Egypt) Mamdouh Abbas	2011	2013
36	3rd	(Egypt) Kamal Darwish	2013	2014
37	3rd	(Egypt) Mortada Mansour	2014	2017
38	4th	(Egypt) Mortada Mansour	2017	2020
39	1st	(Egypt) Ahmed Bakry (Note: The appointed interim committee president of the appointed interim committee in charge of administrating Zamalek SC after the deposition of the previous president, Mortada Mansour, and until the next club presidential election. However, he died after 24 days from taking office, due to COVID-19.)	2020	2020
40	1st	(Egypt) Emad Abdel-Aziz (Note: Appointed as the interim committee president of the appointed interim committee in charge of administrating Zamalek SC after the passing away of the former appointed interim committee president, Ahmed Bakry, and until the next club presidential election.)	2020	2021
41	1st	(Egypt) Hussein Labib (Interim)	2021	2021
42	5th	(Egypt) Mortada Mansour	2021	2023
43	1st	(Egypt) Hassan Moussa (Interim)	2023	2023
44	1st	(Egypt) Imad El-Banani (Interim)	2023	2023
45	2nd	(Egypt) Hussein Labib	2023	Present
