= Hussein Labib =

Egyptian Businessman

- حسين لبيب
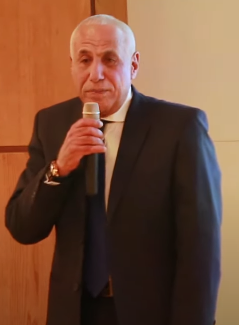
- Labib in 2022

35th and 39th President of Zamalek SC
- In office 23 May 2021 – 21 November 2021
- Preceded by: Mortada Mansour
- Succeeded by: Mortada Mansour
- Incumbent
- Assumed office 20 October 2023
- Preceded by: Mortada Mansour

Personal details
- Born: Hussein Labib; 14 October 1955 (age 70) Cairo, Cairo Governorate, Egypt
- Profession: Businessman, sports club president

Hussein Labib (Arabic: حسين لبيب; born 14 October 1955) is an Egyptian businessman and former handball player. He is the current president of Zamalek SC.

== Biography ==
Labib was born on 18 June 1955 in Cairo. He graduated from Orman Middle School. He played handball in his junior years, he joined Zamalek in 1968 when he was 13 years old. He achieved 21 championships with Zamalek, 7 championships in the Egyptian Professional Handball League, 9 Egyptian Cup championships, and 5 African championships. He participated with the Egyptian national team in 7 tournaments in the African Men's Handball Championship, and 6 tournaments in the World Men's Handball Championship.

He worked as a bank accountant, an administrator in the Egyptian national handball team, a member of the Egyptian National Sports Council, treasurer of the Egyptian Handball Federation, a member of the Marketing Committee of the African Handball Confederation, director of the 2021 World Men's Handball Championship in Egypt, and head of the Zamalek Club's handball apparatus. Labib ran for president of the Egyptian Handball Federation in 2012.

He currently runs his own company in the IT sector. Labib was the head of the former committee charged with managing Zamalek SC. His victory in the elections for the presidency of Zamalek SC, made him President starting from October 2023. Labib won the elections on 20 October 2023.

== See also ==
- List of Egyptians
