= 1952 Egypt Cup final =

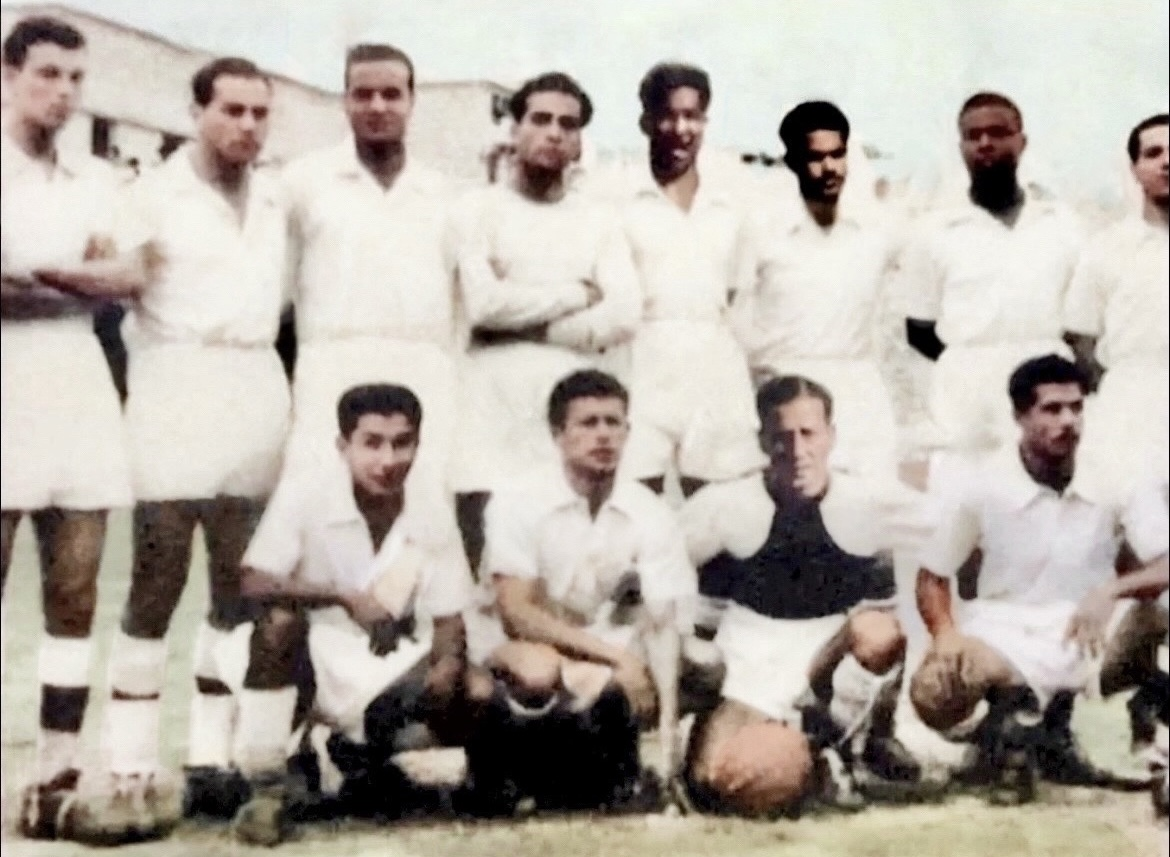
- Zamalek squad, winners of the 1952 Egypt Cup
- Event: 1951–52 Egypt Cup
Zamalek	Al-Ahly
2	0
- Date: 11 May 1952

1952 Egypt Cup final, was the final match of 1951–52 Egypt Cup, when Zamalek (Farouk) beats Al-Ahly by 2–0.

== Route to the final ==
Farouk		Round	Al-Ahly
Opponent	Result	1951–52 Egypt Cup	Opponent	Result
Ithad Suez	4–0	First Round
El-Olympi	2–0	Quarterfinals
Tersana	2–1	Semifinals

== Game description ==
=== Match details ===
11 May 1952

Zamalek SC	2–0	Al-Ahly
El-Far 8'; El-Hamouly 86'	Report

Farouk	Al-Ahly

Zamalek:
GK	(Egypt) Mohamed Abdullah
RB	(Egypt) Abdel Aziz Qabil
CB	(Egypt) Nour El-Dali
CB	(Egypt) Hassan Karkara
LB	(Egypt) Hanafy Bastan
CM	(Egypt) Halim Thalouth
CM	(Egypt) Ahmed Abou Hussein
RW	(Egypt) Essam Baheeg
AM	(Egypt) Alaa El-Hamouly
LW	(Egypt) Younis Marei
CF	(Egypt) Sharif El-Far
Manager:
(Egypt) Abdulrahman Fawzi

Al-Ahly:
GK	(Egypt) Abdel Galil Hemaida
RB	(Egypt) El-Mallah
CB	(Egypt) Sayed Osman
CB	(Egypt) Fahmi Gemaiei
LB	(Egypt) Saleh El Wahsh
CM	(Egypt) Helmi Aboul Maati
CM	(Egypt) Foad Sedki
RW	(Egypt) Toto
AM	(Egypt) Ahmed Mekawi
LW	(Egypt) Moustafa Nasr
CF	(Egypt) Wagih Moustafa
Manager:
