= Mortada Mansour =

Egyptian lawyer (born 1952)

- مرتضى منصور
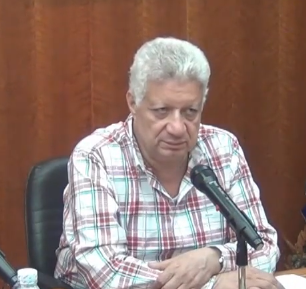
- Mortada Mansour in 2014

21st, 23rd, 31st, 32nd, and 36th President of Zamalek SC
- In office 12 February 2022 – 3 August 2023
- Succeeded by: Hassan Moussa (interim)
- In office 22 November 2021 – 12 February 2022; Acting
- Preceded by: Hussein Labib
- In office 25 November 2017 – 29 November 2020
- Succeeded by: Ahmed Bakry (interim)
- In office 29 March 2014 – 25 November 2017
- Preceded by: Kamal Darwish
- In office 3 April 2006 – 10 August 2006
- Preceded by: Morsi Atallah
- Succeeded by: Raouff Gasser
- In office 3 April 2005 – 21 December 2005
- Preceded by: Kamal Darwish
- Succeeded by: Morsi Atallah

Personal details
- Born: Mortada Ahmed Mohamed Mansour; 18 June 1952 (age 74) Shubra, Cairo Governorate, Kingdom of Egypt
- Spouse: Nagwa El Deeb
- Children: 3
- Profession: Lawyer

Mortada Ahmed Mohamed Mansour (Arabic: مرتضى أحمد محمد منصور; born 17 June 1952 in Cairo) is an Egyptian lawyer who served as president of Zamalek SC in several tenures.

== Education ==
Mansour studied law at Ain Shams University, and graduated in 1974. He later worked at Ismailia Procuracy, before he became a court president.

== Politics ==
After two failed attempts in 1990 and 1995, he became a member of the Egyptian Parliament, from 2000 to 2005, then from 2015 to 2020, representing Dakahlia Governorate. He was appointed the head of the Human Rights Committee in January 2016.

Mansour announced his intention on 6 April 2014 to pursue the presidency in the 2014 Egyptian presidential election, though he withdrew on 19 April and announced his support for former defense minister Abdel Fattah el-Sisi for the presidency.

He announced in January 2018 that he would run in the 2018 Egyptian presidential election. He withdrew from the race several weeks later.

Mansour indicated in January 2018 that he would run for the presidency of the Lawyers Syndicate.

== Career at Zamalek ==
Mansour joined Zamalek in 1992, then he served as a board member from 1996 until 2001, when he became vice-president to Kamal Darwish, before winning the club's presidential election against the latter in April 2005. In December 2005, Egyptian Minister of Youth, Mamdouh El-Beltagy, declared the dissolution of Zamalek's board of directors, in which Morsi Atallah was appointed as president until the next elections; however, Mansour returned to his position in April 2006.

In August 2006, Minister of Sport, Hassan Sakr, announced the second dissolution of the board, as Mansour was sentenced on charges of insulting the head of a judicial body, El-Sayed Naofel, and trying to storm his office. Mansour was imprisoned in 2007 for three years, which was later reduced to one year. In 2009, he lost the elections against Mamdouh Abbas, before defeating Kamal Darwish in 2014. In November 2017, he won another election to remain as president for another three-year tenure.

On 4 October 2020, the board of directors of the Egyptian Olympic Committee decided to suspend Mortada Mansour from practicing any sporting activity in Egypt for four years, based on complaints submitted by the president of Al-Ahly, Mahmoud El Khatib, and many others. On 22 November 2021, Mansour and his board of directors officially returned back to Zamalek SC management, following the departure of the normalization committee until the club's next elections.

On 12 February 2022, he returned to his position at Zamalek for the third time, by defeating Major general Ahmad Suleiman in the elections held by the club through the general assembly.

On 25 February 2023, Mansour turned himself in to Egyptian authorities to serve a one-month prison sentence at Wadi el-Natrun, over a defamation case against Al-Ahly president Mahmoud El Khatib. On 30 March, he resumed his duties at Zamalek after serving his prison sentence. On 16 April, the Court of administrative justice ruled that Minister of Youth and Sports, Ashraf Sobhy, had to remove Mansour from his position as Zamalek president. On 3 August, he announced his departure from Zamalek four months after the court's decision, ahead of club's elections on 31 October.

== Personal life ==
Mansour is married to Najwa al-Deeb, with whom he has two sons and one daughter. He has 9 grandchildren.

== Opinions ==
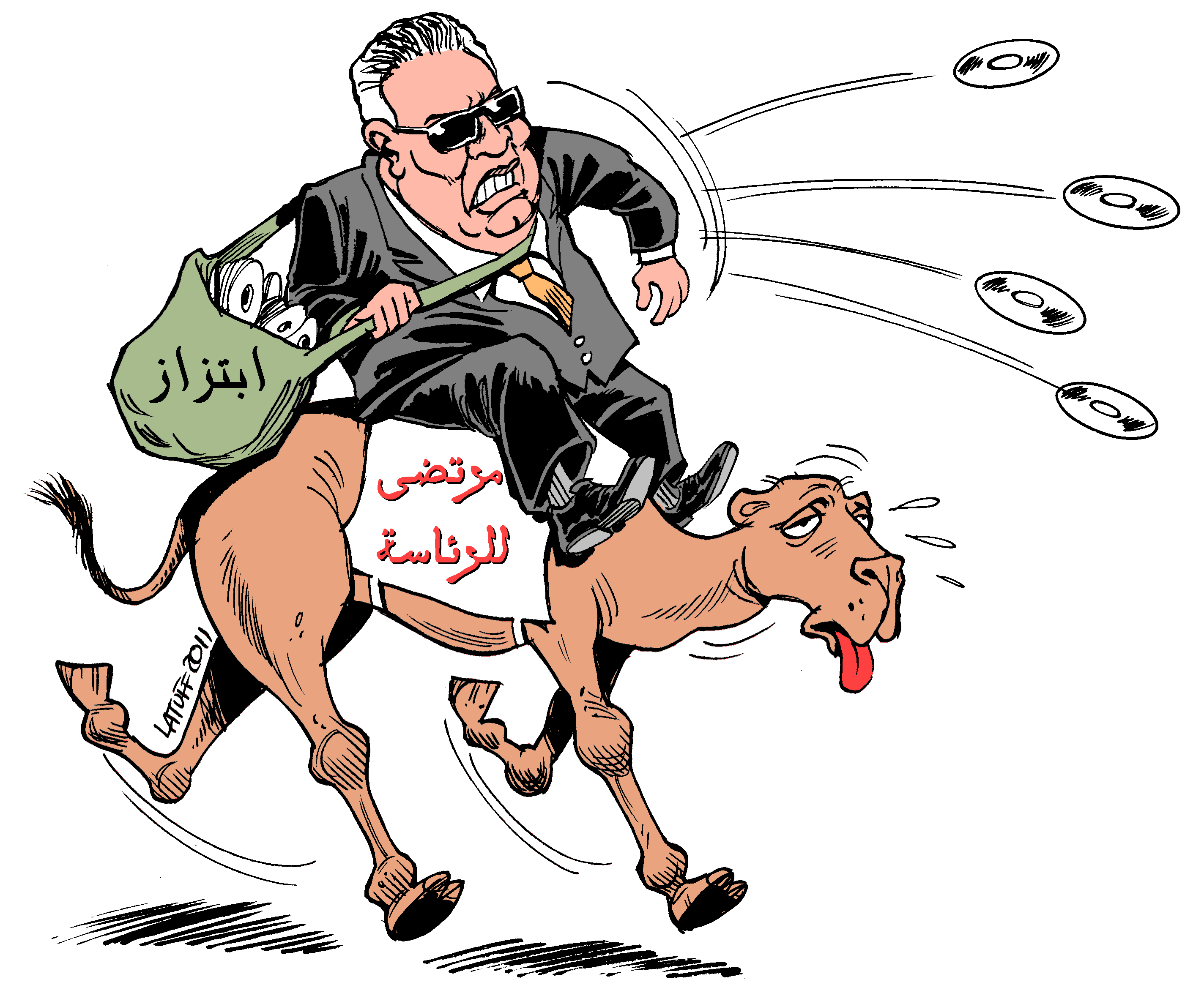
"Mortada Mansour", by Carlos Latuff, 2011. The caricature states that Mansour used extortion through alleged CDs during his presidential campaign

Mansour has called the day of the Egyptian Revolution of 2011, 25 January, "the worst-ever day in Egypt's history". He also holds very strict and negative thoughts and comments towards Zamalek SC's arch rival, Al-Ahly, and consistently accuses them of manipulating the Egyptian football federation for fixing the schedules in their favor. He also believed that black magic and genies were responsible for Zamalek SC's bad luck and poor performances.

Mansour is a vocal critic of actresses and their dresses in Egyptian media. During the COVID-19 pandemic, he criticized robots like Sophia and her manufacturers for imitating God's creation, when he said:

God punishes us "humanity" because we tried to challenge him by making a "robot" to compete with the Creator, a robot that speaks and roams the whole world.

—

== Legal issues and controversies ==
In September 2018, Mansour was suspended by CAF for one year with a fee of 40,000 USD, as he offended its President Ahmad Ahmad and General Secretary Amr Fahmy.

In January 2020, the Egyptian parliament led by Ali Abdel Aal refused three demands to strip Mansour of immunity, due to the presence of malicious suspicion of the complaints, and previous disagreements between him and the accusers. In August, there was a hearing in the Egyptian parliament whether to lift immunity of Mansour, following a voice leak, in which he insulted Al-Ahly president Mahmoud El Khatib and his former player Mahmoud Kahraba. In the meantime, Mansour claimed that his phone was hacked by a Qatari intelligence officer.

On 24 January 2023, Mark Clattenburg who served as president of the Egyptian Referees Committee resigned from his position and left Egypt, due to threats from fans after Mansour alleged that he was in a gay relationship.
