= George Merzbach =

Belgian lawyer

George Merzbach Bey
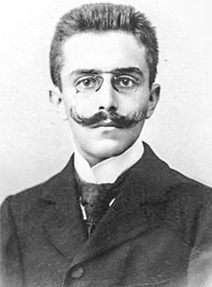
- Merzbach in December 1898

1st President of Zamalek SC
- In office 1911–1913

Personal details
- Born: George Sigismond Charles Stanislas Merzbach; 25 September 1874 City of Brussels, Brussels, Belgium
- Died: 17 February 1928 (aged 53) Cairo, Egypt
- Resting place: Aisle 39, Grave No. 15, Latin Cemetery (Terra Santa Cemetery), Al Sayyidah Zaynab, Old Cairo, Cairo, Egypt
- Spouses: Marie Paléologue (m. 1916; died 1916) Céline-Marie Piha (m. 1922)
- Education: Université libre de Bruxelles
- Occupation: Lawyer
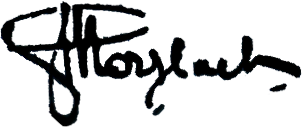
- Signature

George Sigismond Charles Stanislas Merzbach Bey (25 September 1874 – 17 February 1928) was a Belgian lawyer and sports pioneer. He was the head of one of the Mixed Courts of Egypt. In 1911, he founded and became the first president of Egyptian sports club Zamalek SC under the original name of Qasr El Nile Club.

== Early life ==
Merzbach was born in the Belgian City of Brussels on 25 September 1874. His father is Henryk Merzbach (1837–1903) and his mother is Pauline le Hardy de Beaulieu (1851–1948), they married on 27 August 1870. Merzbach has three siblings, one older sister, Helene (1871–1937), one younger brother, Charles (1875–1943), and one younger sister, Claire (1880–1956). Merzbach graduated from the Université libre de Bruxelles with a degree in law before traveling to Egypt to intern as a lawyer with a lawyer friend of his father, Mr. Henry, who was happy with Merzbach's performance during his training. Merzbach returned to Belgium to visit his family before deciding to settle in Cairo and practice his legal profession there. He continued to return to Belgium every summer to visit his family.

== Career ==
=== Law ===
Merzbach was a senior lawyer in Egypt, and one of the guests invited by Sultan Hussein Kamel of Egypt to Abdeen Palace, for official banquets and advice. He had a distinctive legal experience and for that, he became one of the few advisors of Édouard Empain, Baron Empain during the foundation of the Heliopolis suburb. Also, he was one of the lawyers that King Fuad I of Egypt would resort to for legal matters. He was also one of the few lawyers that the Attorney General listened to and took advice from in order to resolve the constitutional crisis between King Fuad I of Egypt and Saad Zaghloul Pasha. Merzbach used to defend the interests of large Egyptian institutions and companies against the British occupants. Merzbach is the founder of the Faculty of Law at Cairo University, which was founded in 1925. And, he was a Professor of Law at Cairo University. Merzbach won the confidence of his fellow lawyers and was elected as the Head of Foreign Lawyers in Egypt in front of the Mixed Courts of Egypt.

=== Zamalek SC ===
Merzbach founded Zamalek SC on 5 January 1911 under the name of Qasr El Nile Club. The founding of the club was a way for Merzbach to strike back at the British occupants in Egypt, as they made the main club in Cairo, Gezira Sporting Club, exclusive for the British Army. The main idea of Zamalek SC was that it would be a club for all people. He then later moved it to the place of the High Court and changed its name to El Mokhtalat Club. Zamalek started out and continued under the presidency of Merzbach until 1915, he then left the presidency to fellow Belgian Nicolas Arfagi Bianchi, who played as a left-winger in the club's football team. Merzbach then did not involve himself in the field of sports again.

=== Honours ===
Merzbach was given many honorific orders and medals including the Order of the Noble (Egypt), the Order of the Medjidie, the Order of the Nile (highest degree of honour in Egypt), the Order of the Star of Ethiopia (highest degree of honour in Ethiopia), the Legion of Honour (highest degree of honour in France), the Order of Leopold (highest degree of honour in Belgium), the Order of the Crown, and the Order of the King given to him by Sultan Hussein Kamel of Egypt. On 24 January 1911, 19 days after founding Zamalek SC, and after his great success in the field of law, Merzbach was promoted by Khedive Abbas II of Egypt and given the honorific title of Bey, a rank lower than Pasha but higher than Effendi. Khedive Abbas II of Egypt was known for being anti-British occupation of Egypt, a stance that Merzbach shared with him. Merzbach was among the passengers on the first plane piloted by foreigners in Egypt which took place in Heliopolis in 1914. In 1922, the great archaeologist Howard Carter took Merzbach and his wife, Céline-Marie Piha, to Luxor during the discovery of the prominent and magnificent Tomb of Tutankhamun.

== Personal life ==
Merzbach spoke French as his first language. He was a Roman Catholic. Merzbach married his first wife, Marie Paléologue (born 24 December 1879), on 27 July 1916, she was the daughter of Dimitri and Ortenaia, they belonged to the family of the Byzantine emperors, she died on 13 November 1916, less than four months after their marriage, she was killed in the only aerial bombardment of Cairo in the First World War which was perpetrated by the German aircrews of the Luftstreitkräfte. Merzbach married his second wife, Céline-Marie Piha (born 9 July 1885 in Alexandria), on 4 February 1922, she was the daughter of Elie and Elvire Nahman, she died on 9 October 1972 in London, 44 years after Merzbach's death. Merzbach never had any children.

== Death ==
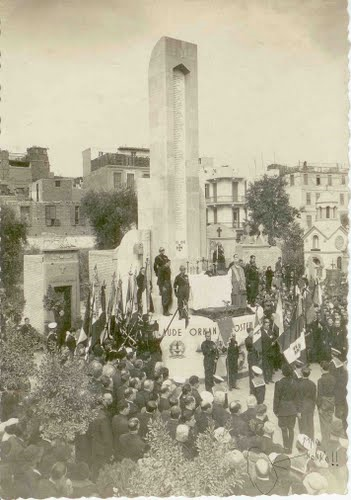
George Merzbach Bey's funeral at the Latin Cemetery (Terra Santa Cemetery) in 1928

Merzbach died on 27 February 1928, at the age of 53, in Cairo, Egypt. Merzbach's funeral was attended by the Head of the Supreme Judicial Council and the Minister of Justice. He was buried in the Latin Cemetery (Terra Santa Cemetery) in Al Sayyidah Zaynab, Old Cairo, Cairo, Egypt. His burial place is present in Aisle 39, Grave No. 15.
