= Mohammed Haidar Pasha =

Egyptian politician and general (1888–1957)

- محمد حيدر باشا
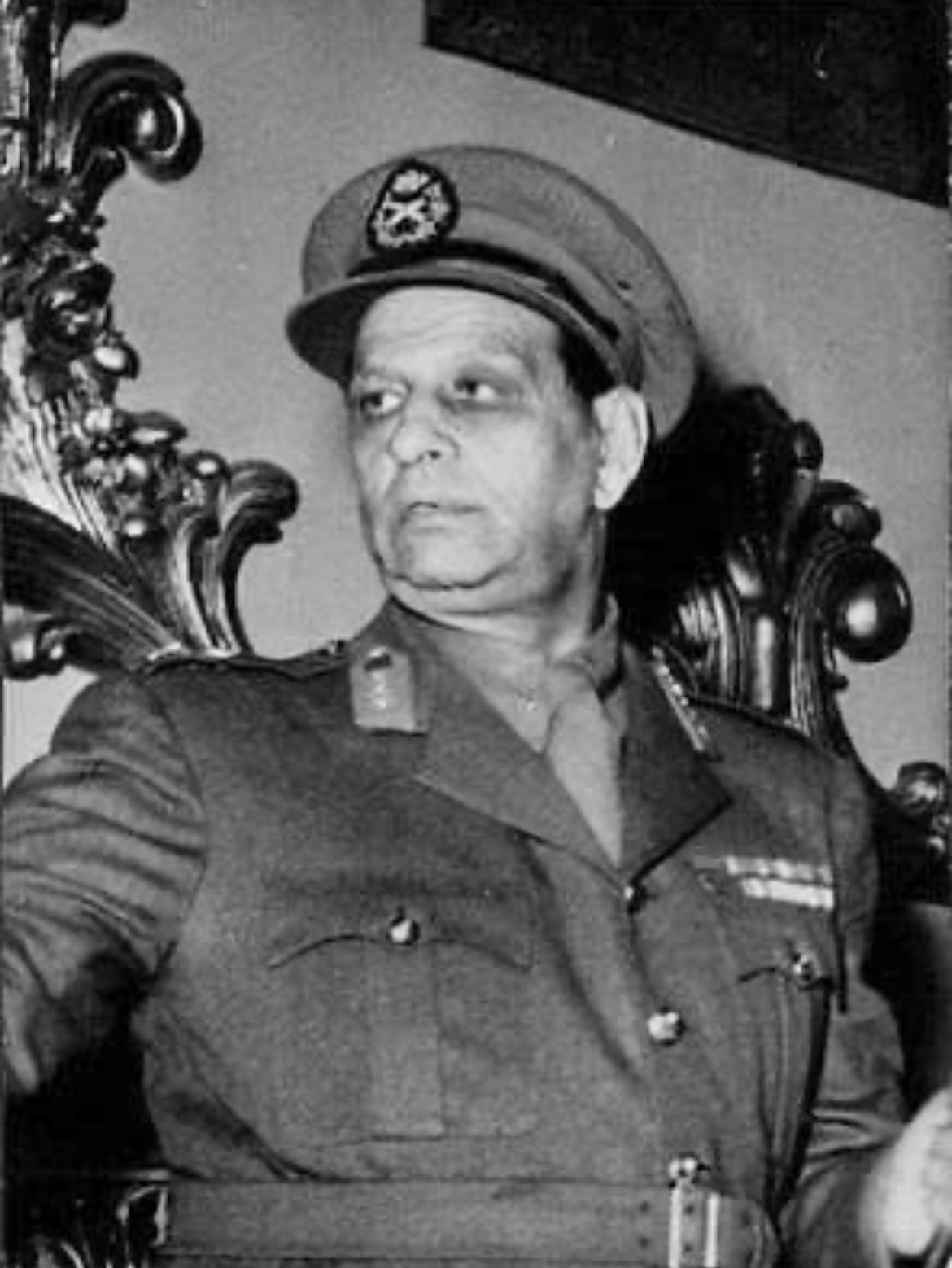
- Haidar Pasha in 1951

Minister of War
- In office 19 November 1947 – 23 July 1952

4th President of Zamalek SC
- In office 19 May 1923 – 23 August 1952

Personal details
- Born: Mohamed Haidar Sayed El Heiny; 11 February 1887 El-Minya, Khedivate of Egypt
- Died: 1 October 1957 (aged 70) Cairo, Egypt
- Resting place: El-Minya, Egypt
- Relations: Abdel Hakim Amer, Nephew

Military service
- Allegiance: Egypt
- Branch/service: Egyptian Army
- Years of service: 1910–1952
- Rank: General
- Commands: Chief of Staff; Commander-in-Chief of the Egyptian Armed Forces
- Battles/wars: 1948 Arab–Israeli War

Mohamed Haidar Sayed El Heiny (Arabic: محمد حيدر محمد السيد الحيني; 10 December 1887 – 1 October 1957) was an Egyptian military officer and politician. Haidar Pasha served in the 1948 Arab–Israeli War, and played a leading role in the Egyptian politics before the 1952 Revolution, especially in King Farouk's reign. He was appointed Minister for War by King Farouk. Haidar Pasha was also the 4th president of Zamalek SC, he is the longest serving president in the history of the club.

== Early life and education ==
Mohammed Haidar was born in Abwan, Matai, El-Minya on 11 February 1887. He was sharp and honest. The Egyptian Military leader Ahmed Orabi, was his role model. He joined the Egyptian Military Academy, he was known among his colleagues and superiors for his precision, discipline, good morals, and seriousness. He graduated from the Egyptian Military Academy in 1909, and was the first in his class in the cavalry. He was commissioned into the Egyptian Army in 1910.

== Military career ==
In 1917, Haidar Pasha was appointed commander of the Sawari police station in Cairo. In 1934, he was appointed head of the Prison Service, and army officers were allowed to hold this position. He traveled as Emir of Hajj in 1942, accompanied by the Kaaba kiswah.

Haider Pasha took over the Ministry of War in 1947 within the government of Mahmoud El Nokrashy Pasha. Haidar Pasha served as Minister of War in the coalition ministry headed by Hussein Sirri Pasha in 1949, and remained in office until Hussein Siri returned again and formed a neutral ministry on 3 November 1949.

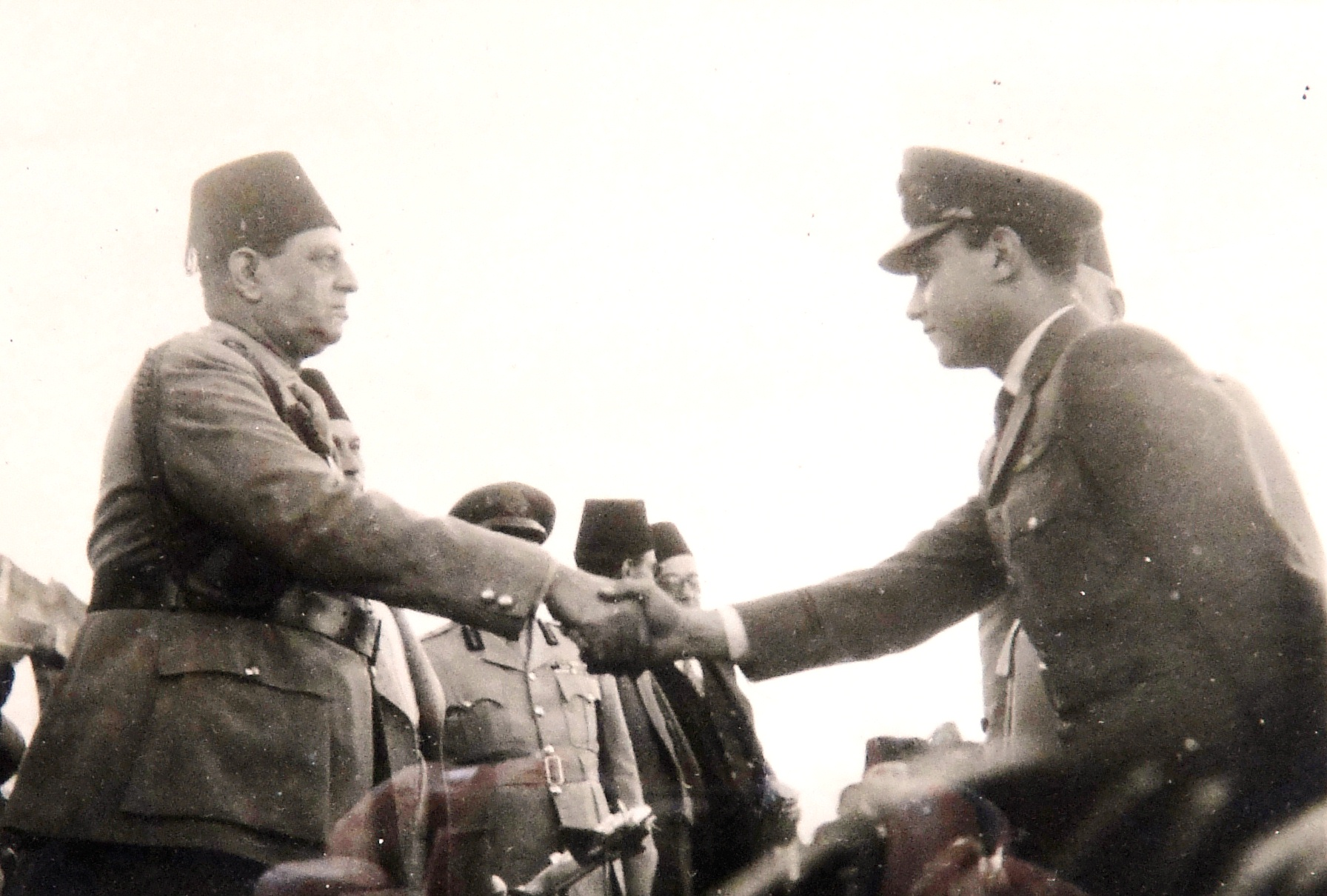
Abdel Hamid Mahmoud (right) shaking hands with Haidar Pasha before flying to check and pick up the King's airplane

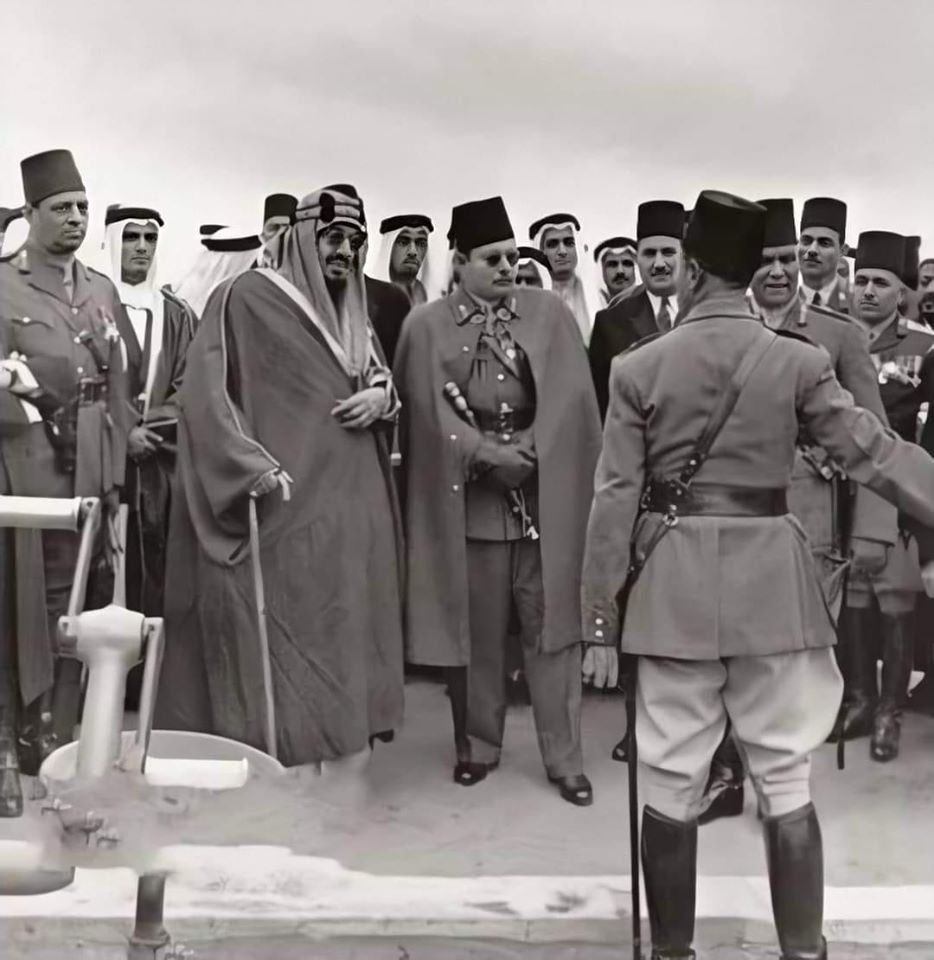
Haidar Pasha (first from left) with Farouk I and Ibn Saud checking an Egyptian army unite in 1946. Also appearing are: princes Fahd, Abdullah, and Mishaal, sons of Ibn Saud, as well as prince Muhammad Abdel Moneim

When the elections were held and the Ministry of Hussein Sirri Pasha resigned during the era of Mostafa El-Nahas Pasha, the Serail insisted on appointing Haider Pasha as Minister of War. He was a prison officer with no military experience, but El-Nahas Pasha refused, and this was met with Royal Decree No. 13 of 1948 appointing him as Commander-in-Chief of the Egyptian Armed Forces, the first to assume this position after its establishment.

After his appointment as Commander-in-Chief of the Armed Forces, Haider Pasha found the poor morale of the officers, and he demanded from the King a promotion for the officers, and the king agreed. Haidar Pasha was close to King Farouk, however, Haidar Pasha was aware of the plot of the Coup d'état that led to the 1952 Revolution and the overthrow of the king, but didn't warn the king. Haidar pasha was Abdel Hakim Amer's uncle, Amer was one of the free officers movement. He returned Anwar Sadat back to the army after he was discharged. After 1952, Haidar Pasha was untouchable, he lived peacefully in his hometown in Minya, even the free officers including Gamal Abdel Nasser went to meet him led by Mohamed Naguib himself.

== Sports career ==
Haidar Pasha was a Zamalek fan, he loved that Zamalek used to win British football teams, the club became specialized in defeating them. It included distinguished players at that time, such as Hussein Hegazy, El-Sayed Abaza, Mokhtar Fawzi, Tewfik Abdullah, and others. The team played in the final of the Sultan Hussein Cup in 1921 against the Sherwoods. Zamalek won 2–1, and the two goals were scored by El-Sayed Abaza and Hussein Hegazy.

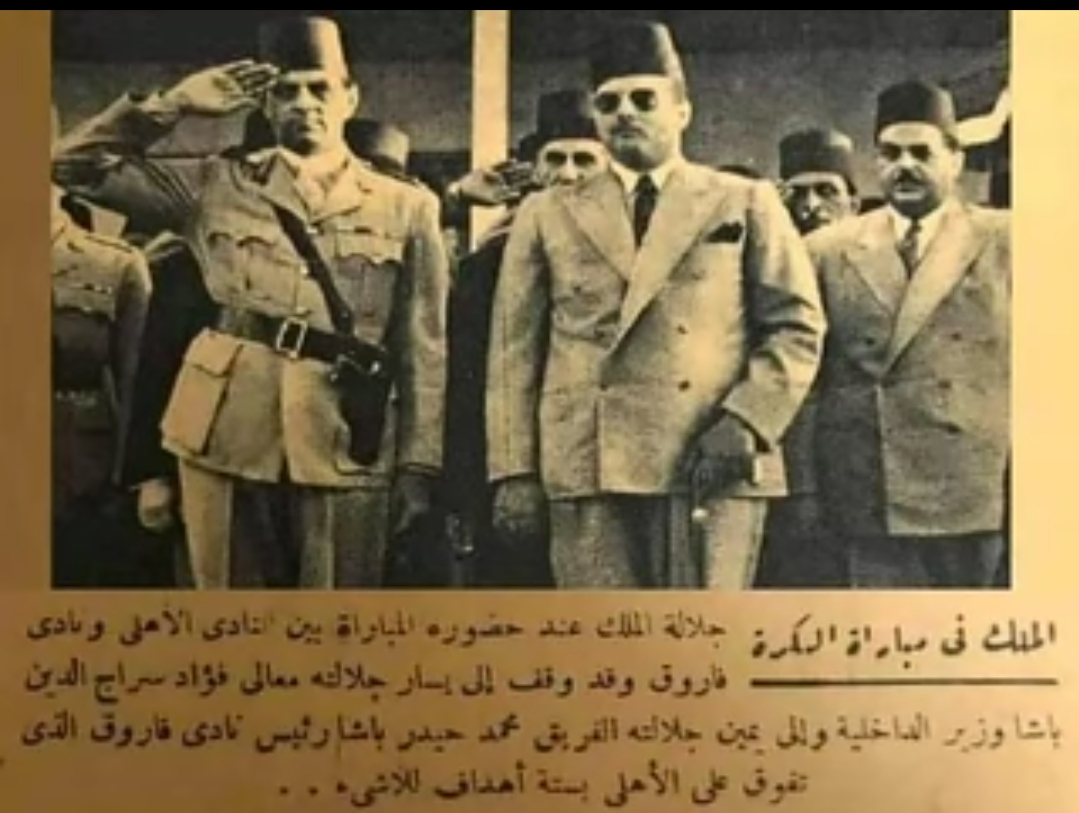
Haidar Pasha (left) with King Farouk I, the Honorary President of Zamalek SC attending the 1944 Egypt Cup final, ended with the largest win in the history of the Cairo derby with a 6–0 win for Zamalek, 2 June 1944

In 1923, the intensity of the dispute between the Egyptian members of Zamalek and the foreign members was escalating. The members asked Youssef Mohamed to search for an Egyptian president for the club, and the members decided to hold a general assembly for the club to choose a new president, and the number of members of the assembly was thirty five members, and the Egyptian members learned that foreigners intended to seize the club. On the night of the General Assembly, the Egyptian members decided to guard the club with arrows and sticks, and the atmosphere was threatening to explode. The matter ended with the election of Mohammed Haider Pasha as president of the Zamalek Club.

Haidar Pasha headed the Egyptian Football Association in 1937, he remained in charge of the association until 1944, when Fouad Serageddin took over the presidency. In 1945 Haidar Pasha returned to office and remained until 1952.

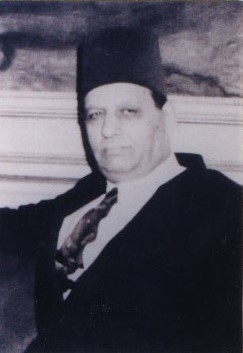
Haidar Pasha in 1950

He headed the club for twenty nine years, he is the longest serving president in the history of Zamalek. The club had achieved major successes in his era. He loved the club and the players as family. Haidar Pasha used to interfere in choosing players for the team, he discovered dozens of players who became stars of the Egyptian football through his three decade career as Zamalek's president.

== Death ==
Haidar Pasha died on 1 October 1957, at the age of 70. A military funeral was held from the Omar Makram Mosque, Tahrir Square, Cairo. The funeral was attended by the entire Revolutionary Command Council including Major General Abdel Hakim Amer, his nephew and Minister of War at that time.

== See also ==
- List of Egyptians
