= Nour El-Dali =

Egyptian footballer (1928–2004)

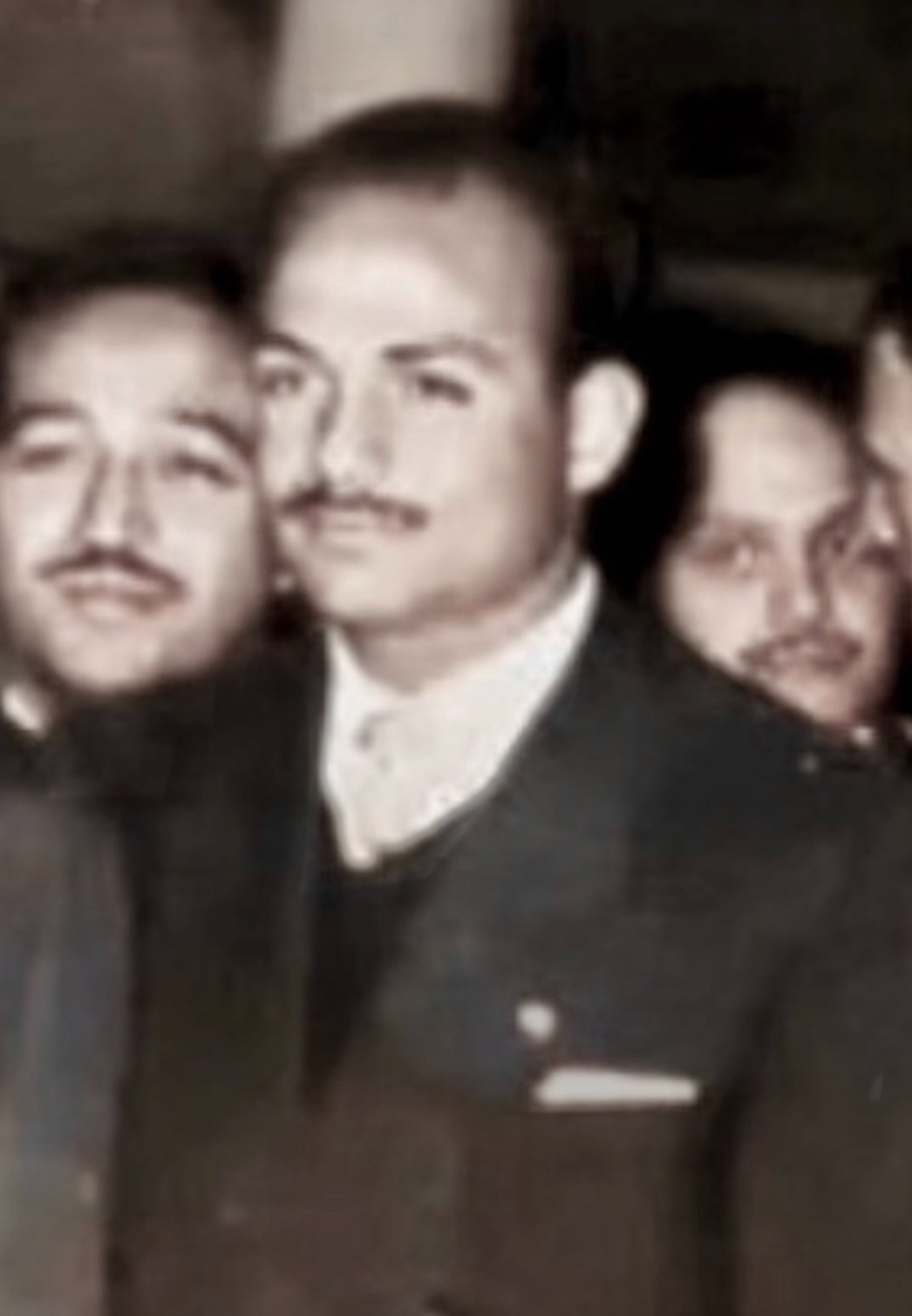
- El-Dali in 1961

17th President of Zamalek SC
- In office 1990–1992

Personal details
- Born: Nour El-Din Ahmed El-Dali; 24 October 1928 Helwan, Cairo, Egypt
- Died: 16 April 2004 (aged 75) Cairo, Egypt
Association football career
- Position: Defender
Senior career*
Years	Team	Apps	(Gls)
1950–1960	Zamalek		
International career
	Egypt	3	(0)
Medal record
Men's Football
Representing Egypt
Africa Cup of Nations
Winner	1957 Sudan
Mediterranean Games
Gold medal – first place	1955 Barcelona
Silver medal – second place	1951 Alexandria
- * Club domestic league appearances and goals

Nour El-Din Ahmed El-Dali (Arabic: نور الدالي 24 October 1928 – 16 April 2004) was an Egyptian footballer executive and player who played for Zamalek and Egypt as a defender, represented his country and was part of the team that won the 1957 Africa Cup of Nations. He was also part of Egypt's squad for the football tournament at the 1952 Summer Olympics, but he did not play in any matches. El-Dali was the president of Zamalek for two years, between 1990 and 1992.

Graduated as an Engineer, El-Dali was the last footballer to hold the position of the president of Zamalek to date. As a player, he spent his entire career with Zamalek. He was in the starting lineup at the club and the national team for over a decade. He was elected as Zamalek's board member more than once before being elected as president.

== Career ==
El-Dali started his with Zamalek's youth teams in the early 1930s. He played his whole professional football career in the club, he was a defender, he was included in the starting lineup for a decade. He won with Zamalek the Cairo League for three consecutive seasons in (1950–51, 1951–52, 1952–53). He won with Zamalek six titles of the Egypt Cup in (1951–52, 1954–55, 1956–57, 1957–58, 1958–59, 1959–60). El-Dali was the captain of Zamalek's squad that won the Egyptian Premier League title in (1959–60) in the final season of his career. He retired from football in 1960.

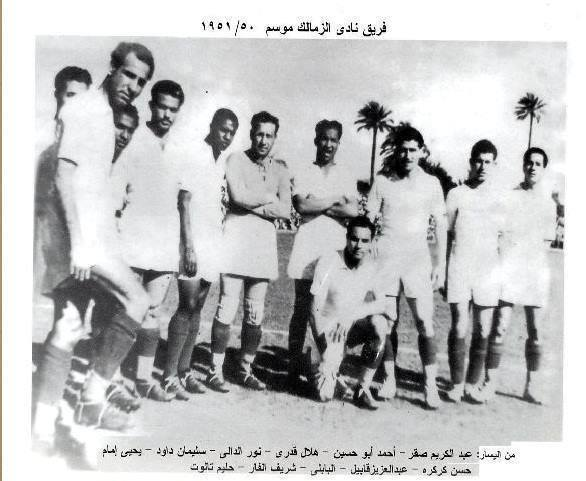
El-Dali (fourth from left) with Zamalek in 1951

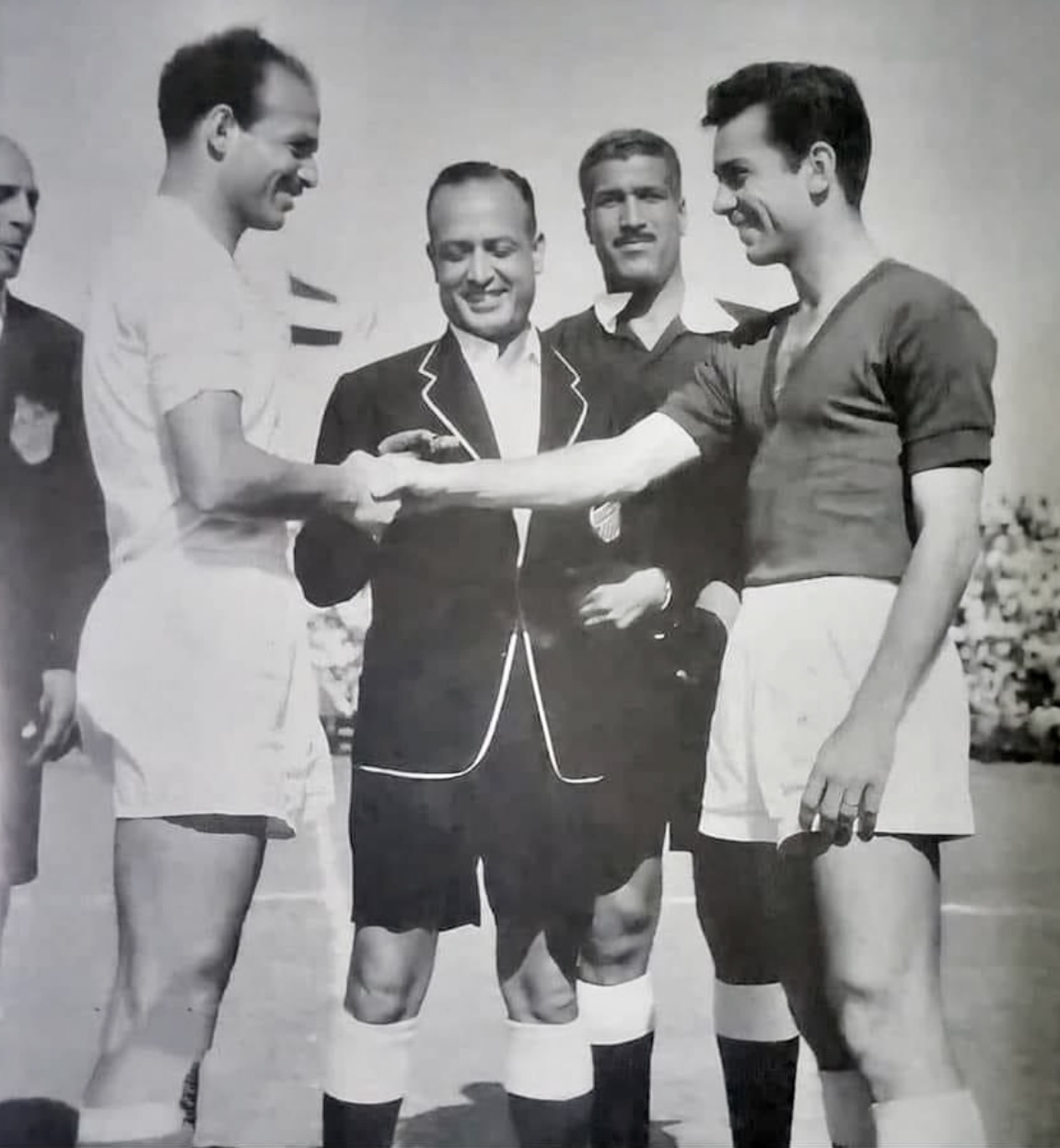
The Cairo derby; Zamalek's captain Nour El-Dali and Al Ahly's captain Saleh Selim shaking hands and referee preparing to make a coin toss before the 1959 Egypt Cup final on 24 April 1959

He played for the Egypt national team in the early 1950s, and was a part of the team that won the silver medal in the 1951 Mediterranean Games in Alexandria. El-Dali played for his country in the 1955 Mediterranean Games in Barcelona, and Egypt won the gold medal. In the first edition of the Africa Cup of Nations, he was a part of the team that won the 1957 African Cup of Nations in Sudan.

After his retirement from football, El-Dali worked as an Engineer, since he holds a bachelor's degree in Engineering. Besides his private job, he was elected as Zamalek's president in 1990. During his presidency, Zamalek won the Egyptian Premier League title in (1991-92, 1992-93), to be the only president to win the league title with Zamalek as a player and president. He held the post for two years till 1992. For many, El-Dali is one of the most influential presidents of Zamalek in its history. He was the last footballer to hold the presidency of the club.

== Honours ==
=== Player ===
Zamalek

- Egypt Cup (6): 1951–52, 1954–55, 1956–57, 1957–58, 1958–59, 1959–60
- Cairo League (3): 1950–51, 1951–52, 1952–53
- Egyptian Premier League (1): 1959–60

Egypt

- African Cup of Nations: 1957
- Mediterranean Games: Gold Medal 1955; Silver Medal, 1951
